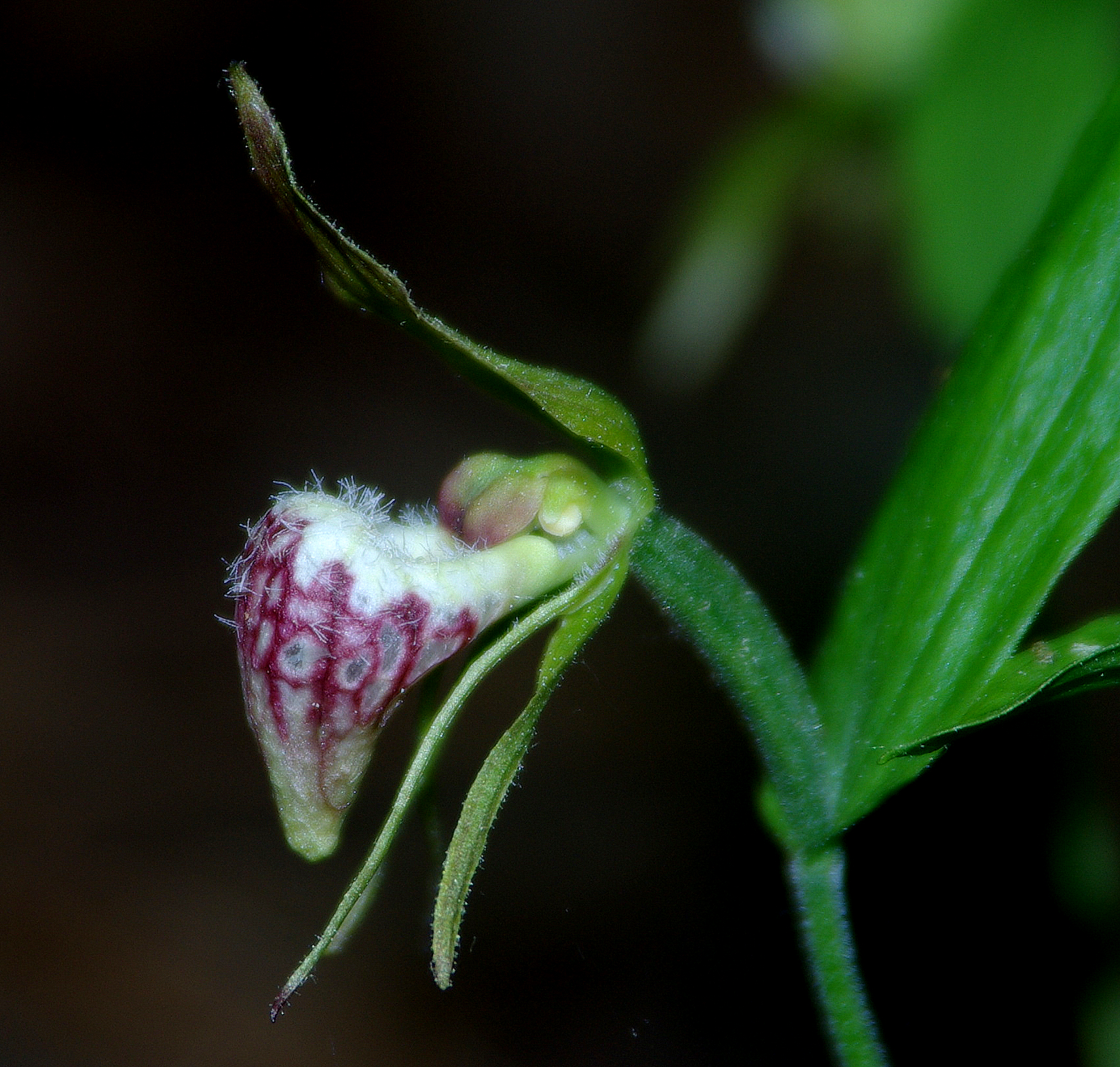

Conservation status
- Near Threatened (IUCN 3.1)

- Vulnerable (NatureServe)

Scientific classification
- Kingdom: Plantae
- Clade: Tracheophytes
- Clade: Angiosperms
- Clade: Monocots
- Order: Asparagales
- Family: Orchidaceae
- Subfamily: Cypripedioideae
- Genus: Cypripedium
- Species: C. arietinum

Binomial name
- Cypripedium arietinum R.Br. (1813)

Synonyms
- Synonyms (5): Criosanthes arietina (R. Br.) House (1905); Criosanthes borealis Raf. (1818); Arietinum americanum L.C. Beck (1833); Cypripedium arietinum f. albiflorum House (1923); Cypripedium arietinum f. biflorum P.M.Br. (1995)

= Cypripedium arietinum =

Species of flowering plant in the orchid family

Cypripedium arietinum, commonly known as the ram's-head lady's slipper, is a small herbaceous perennial in the orchid family, Orchidaceae. Its common name refers to the resemblance between the flowers and a ram's head. Native to eastern North America, it grows in swamp forests, sandy bluffs, and upland forests, with a distribution centered around the Great Lakes region and extending west to Saskatchewan and east to Nova Scotia. The species primarily spreads vegetatively by forming clumps of genetically identical offshoots, but they are also pollinated by sweat bees. Populations vary from a few individuals to more than one thousand plants.

Among the North American slipper orchids, C. arietinum has distinctive floral morphology, including unfused lateral sepals and a lip with a pointed base. These characteristics led some early taxonomists to place the plant in a separate genus. Modern taxonomic and phylogenetic work places it in Cypripedium sect. Arietinum, together with its closest relative, the east Asian species C. plectrochilum.

Populations of the plant have declined over the past few generations, and it has been extirpated from parts of its native range. Its primary threats include habitat loss, increased herbivory by deer, invasive species, and poaching, and it is considered a species of conservation concern in every state and province where it occurs.

== Description ==
Cypripedium arietinum is an herbaceous perennial growing 10–35 cm (4–14 in) tall. It grows from a short rhizome about 7 cm (2.8 in) long with fibrous roots about 30 cm (12 in) long. Its stems are erect, with three to five leaves arranged alternately or in a spiral near the middle of the stem. The leaves are elliptic, 5–11 cm (2–4 in) long and 1.3–3.5 cm (0.51–1.38 in) wide.

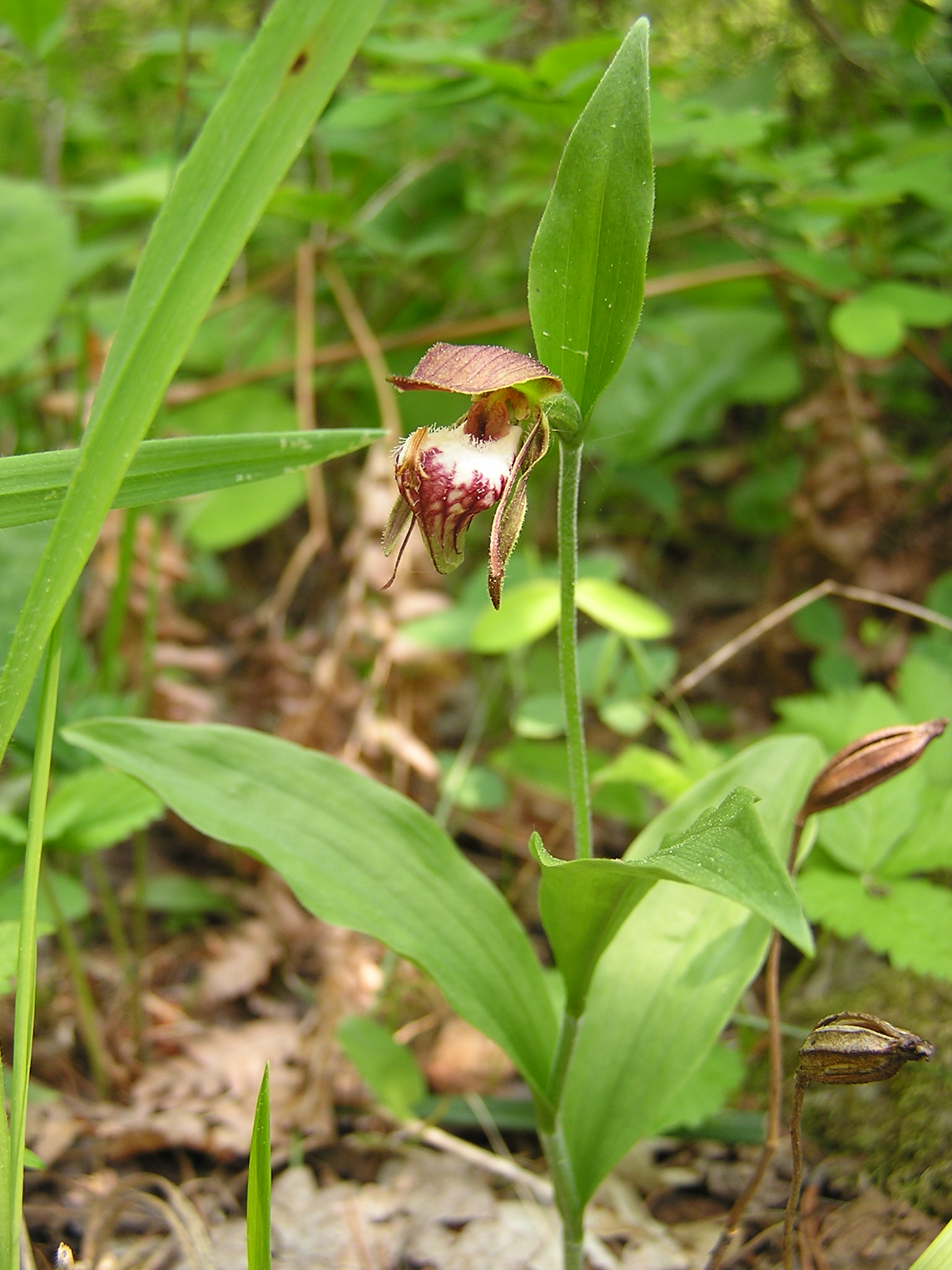
An entire plant, with three leaves arranged in a spiral near the middle of the stem and a single flower, held by a leafy bract

Each flowering stem bears one flower (or rarely two), subtended by a leafy bract 2.5–6 cm (0.98–2.36 in) long. The flowers are zygomorphic, with three sepals and three petals. The sepals are brown or purple, sometimes with green streaks, and are free at their bases, in contrast to other North American orchids whose sepals are fused. At the top of the flower, the dorsal sepal forms a hood over the other flower parts, 1.5–2.5 cm (0.59–0.98 in) long and 1–2 cm (0.39–0.79 in) wide. On either side, the narrow lateral sepals twist downward and are 1.5–2 cm (0.59–0.79 in) long. The lateral petals are similar in color and orientation to the lateral sepals but are narrower. At the base of the flower, the median petal, also called the labellum or lip, forms a pouch with a tapered, cone-shaped base; it is 1.5–2.5 cm (0.59–0.98 in) long and 1–2 cm (0.39–0.79 in) wide. The lip's orifice is white and densely covered in long hairs, and the lower part of the lip has maroon-colored reticulations. The flowers emit a vanilla-like fragrance.

As with all orchids, the flower's male and female reproductive structures are fused in a structure called the column. A modified stamen called the staminode forms the rounded, convex tip of the column, with the stigma below. The two lateral anthers contain loose, granular pollen.

The fruit is a narrow capsule 1.5–2.5 cm (0.59–0.98 in) long, ascending from the tip of the stem but less erect than the fruit of other members of the genus. It contains numerous seeds that are extremely small and lightweight, with air comprising 96% of their volume. The diploid chromosome number is 2n = 20.

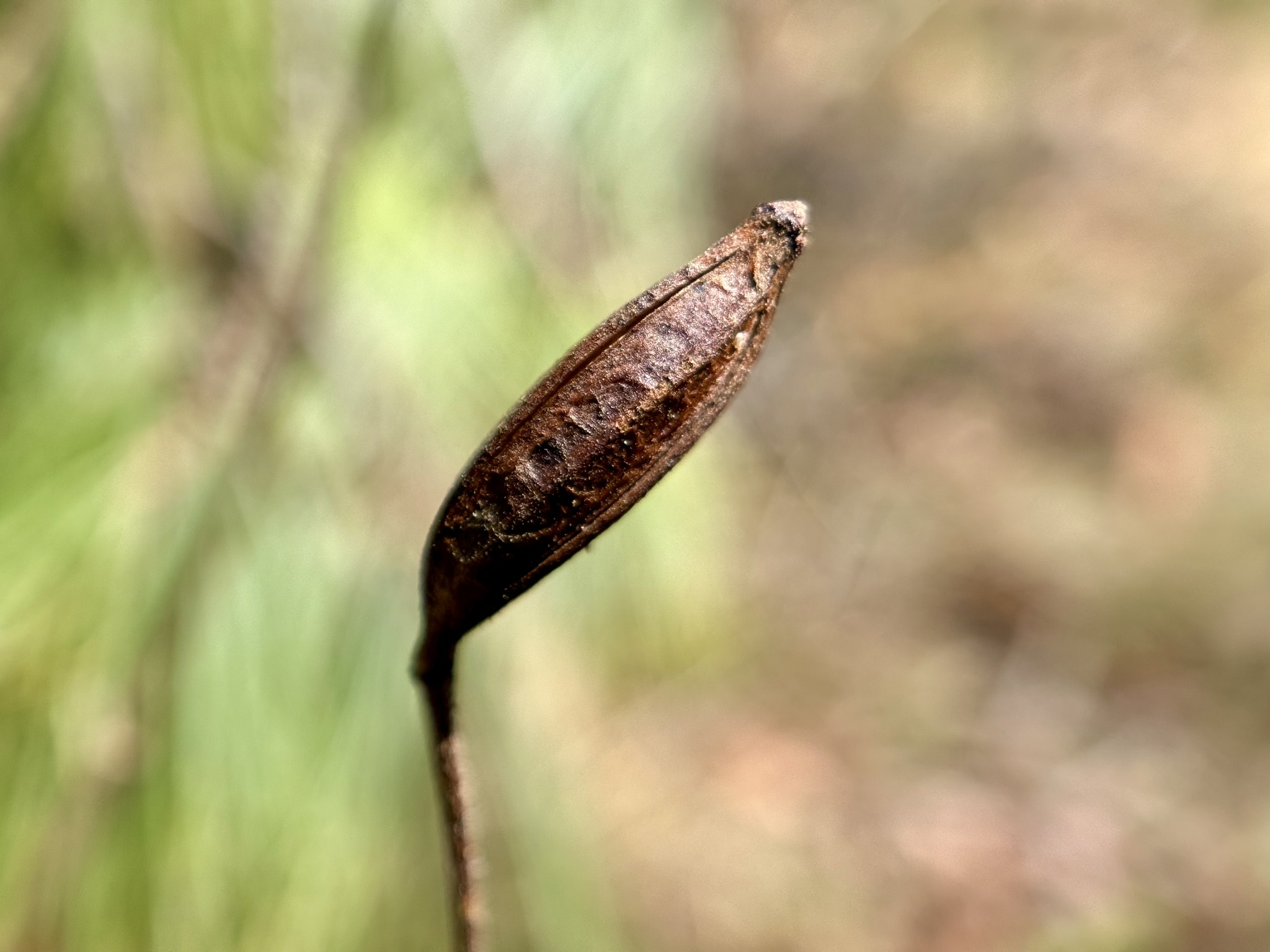
A dried fruit capsule

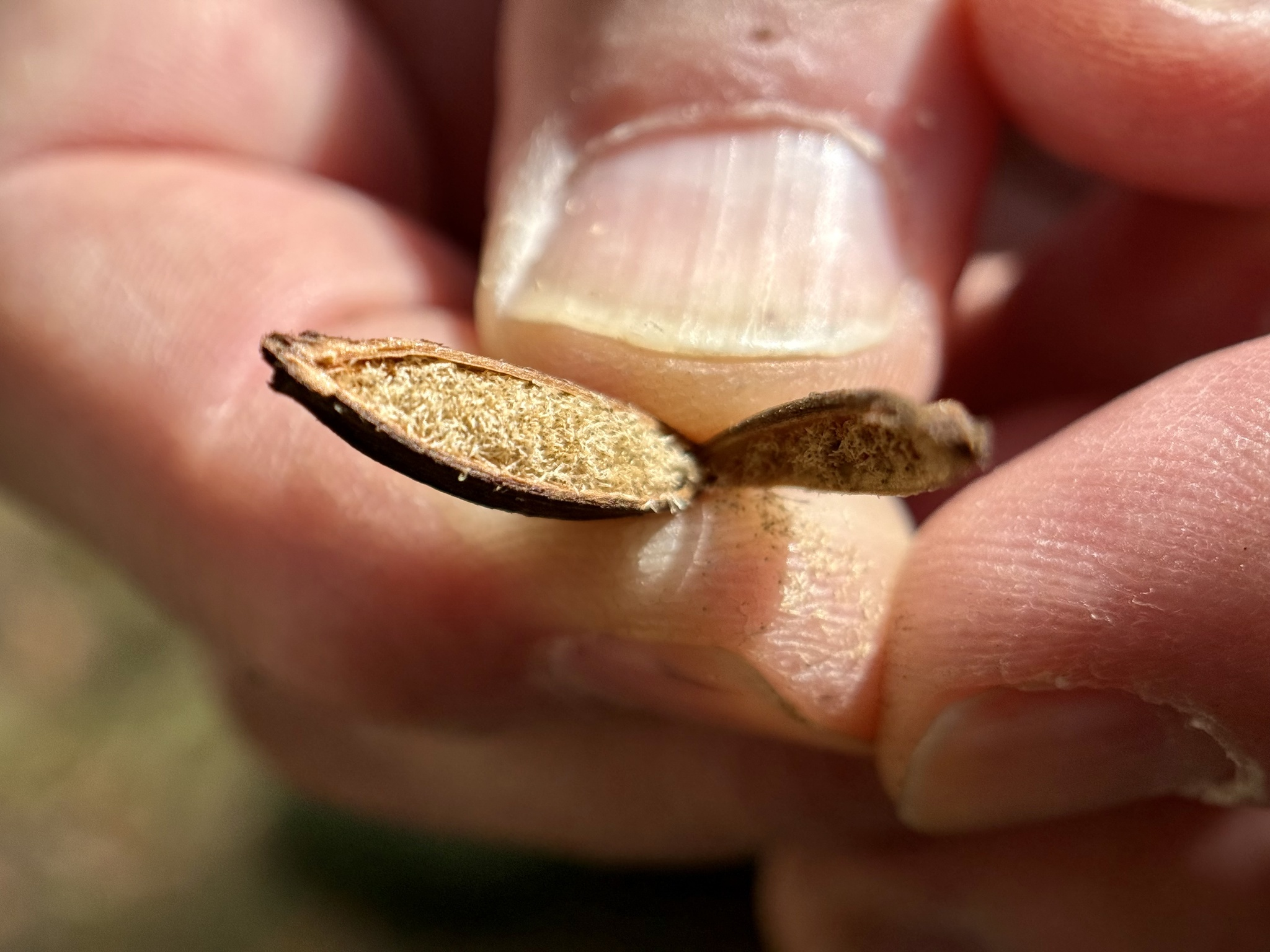
Seeds inside a mature capsule

== Taxonomy ==
=== Taxonomic history ===
The botanist Robert Brown described Cypripedium arietinum in 1813, noting that the plant had been introduced to the Kew Gardens in 1808 by horticulturalists Chandler and Buckingham. In 1818, Rafinesque proposed that "Cypripedium arietinum must form a peculiar genus" and transferred it to its own genus, Criosanthes, giving it the combination Criosanthes borealis. House supported the recognition of Criosanthes as a monotypic genus but recombined the species as Criosanthes arietinum in 1905. Beck also rejected the plant's placement in Cypripedium, "as it is so very different from all the species of that genus." He placed it in another new, monotypic genus, giving it the name Arietinum americanum in 1833. Modern authorities, including Flora of North America and Plants of the World Online, place the taxon in Cypripedium.

In 1923, House described a form of the plant with green sepals and petals and white lips as Cypripedium arietinum f. albiflorum. Another form, C. arietinum f. biflorum, was used in 1995 by P. M. Brown to refer to plants with two flowers per stem. However, modern taxonomic treatments do not consider either taxonomically meaningful and do not recognize any infraspecific taxa.

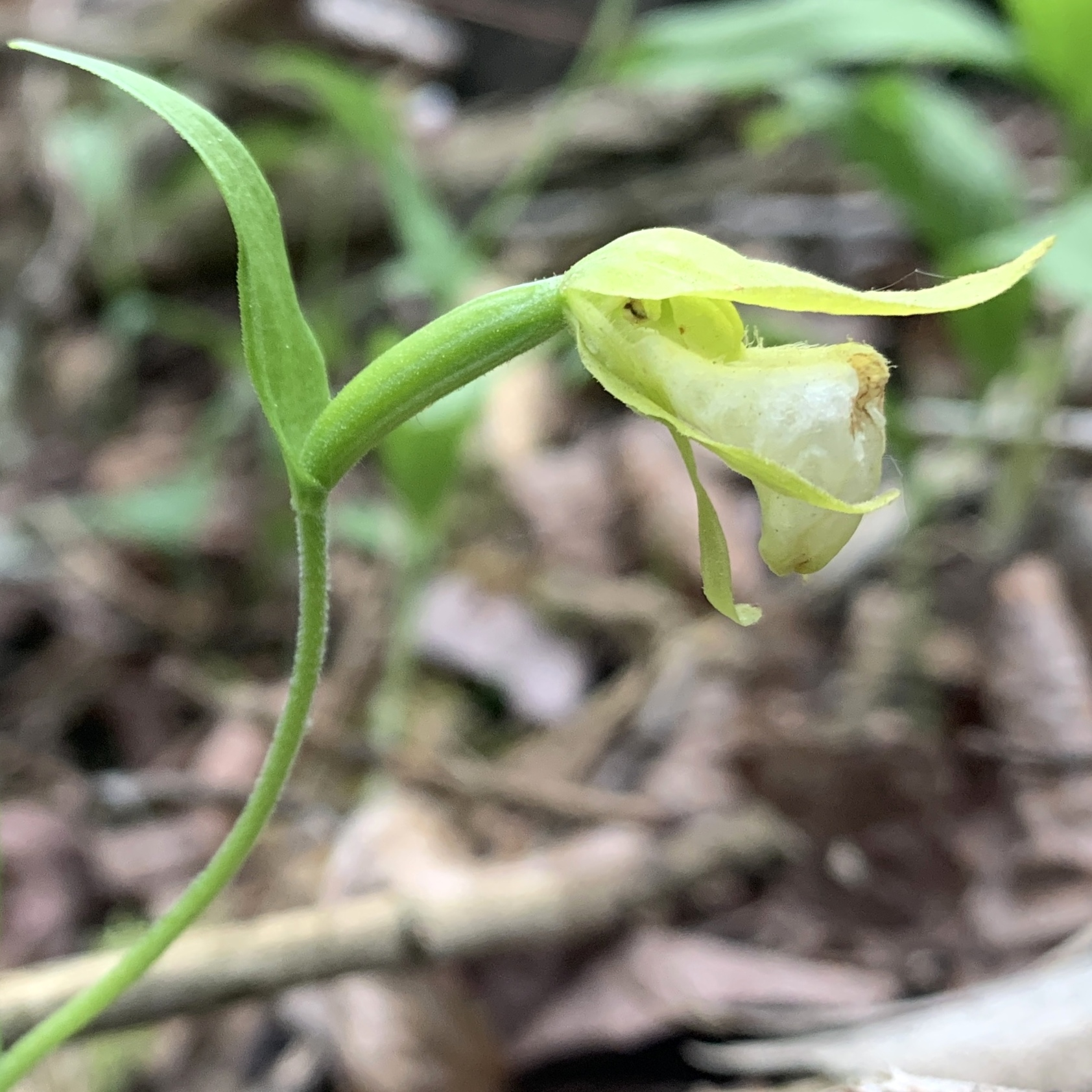
A plant with white and green flowers, formerly called Cypripedium arietinum f. albiflorum

=== Etymology ===
The epithet arietinum means 'ram-like' in Latin. This, and the common name ram's-head lady's slipper, make reference to the shape of the flower, which resembles a ram's head. In this analogy, the lateral petals are imagined as horns and the lip as a charging ram's lowered head.

=== Phylogeny ===
In his 1997 monograph of Cypripedium, Phillip Cribb recognized taxonomic sections composed of closely related species, placing C. arietinum and C. plectrochilum (native to east Asia) together in Cypripedium sect. Arietinum. A 2011 phylogenetic analysis using nuclear ribosomal ITS sequences and chloroplast sequences supported the hypothesis that section Arietinum, containing these two species, represents a monophyletic lineage. Further phylogenetic work in 2024 suggested that Arietinum was one of the earliest-diverging sections in the evolution of Cypripedium, diverging from most other lineages in the early Miocene, 20.6–12.2 million years ago.

== Distribution and habitat ==
=== Geographic distribution ===
The range of Cypripedium arietinum in North America

The native range of Cypripedium arietinum extends across approximately 700,000 km^{2} of northeastern North America and the Great Lakes region. The western portion of its range lies within the Laurentian Mixed Forest Province, and the eastern part lies within the sand plains of the Eastern Broadleaf Forest Province. This includes parts of Saskatchewan, Manitoba, Ontario, Minnesota, Wisconsin, Michigan, New York, southern Quebec, Maine, Vermont, New Hampshire, and Massachusetts, with disjunct populations in Anticosti Island and Nova Scotia. A single population was documented in Connecticut, but the species is now extirpated in the state. Most populations are concentrated around Lake Huron and Lake Michigan.

=== Habitat preferences ===
Cypripedium arietinum grows in a wide range of habitats. Features that are common to all habitat types include cool soils, slightly acidic to slightly alkaline soil chemistry, calcareous geology, and mid-successional forests with 30–80% canopy cover. Many of these habitats are created or maintained by wind or fire disturbance. The species has an elevational range of 0–400 m (0–1,312 ft) and shows tolerance for a wider variety of habitats near the core of its distribution than at the periphery. There are three main habitat types where populations occur:

- Swamp forests dominated by Thuja occidentalis, Abies balsamea, and Picea mariana, with a carpet of Sphagnum moss covering a layer of peat. This is the most common habitat type in Minnesota. Here, C. arietinum grows on small mounds of moss where its roots sit above the high water table. Plants in these habitats are typically solitary and reach their largest sizes.
- Exposed, north-facing hillsides and dunes around the upper Great Lakes region, with Juniperus communis, Juniperus horizontalis, Pinus banksiana, Pinus resinosa, or Thuja occidentalis. The soil consists of nearly pure sand, covered by conifer mulch and overlying limestone cobble or bedrock. These habitats contain the largest populations of C. arietinum, including on Isle Royale, where nearly 10,000 individuals occur.
- Upland mixed conifer/hardwood forests with Thuja occidentalis, Abies balsamea, Tsuga canadensis, and various species of Acer, Populus, Betula, Quercus, and Pinus. This is the most common habitat type in northern New England. The soils in these environments are usually dry and sandy, loamy, or clay-rich, often overlying limestone or, in Nova Scotia, gypsum bedrock.

== Ecology ==
=== Life history ===
Like many members of its genus, Cypripedium arietinum is long-lived. It matures over the course of 15–25 years, producing their first flowers 10–16 years after germination. The plants spread primarily by producing genetically identical offshoots, sometimes forming large clumps.

Flowers open in May and June and are not self-fertile, meaning that sexual reproduction requires outcrossing by a pollinator. Unfertilized flowers remain fresh for about a week, but once fertilized, the dorsal sepal quickly closes the opening to the labellum, preventing other pollinators from entering. The seeds are produced in the summer and dispersed slowly by wind from October through the following spring or summer. Despite their nearly microscopic size, the seeds' potential for long-distance wind dispersal is likely limited by the dense vegetation where the plants grow. Within populations of Cypripedium arietinum, the proportion of plants producing seeds in any year is low.

Like other orchids, the seed must develop a mycorrhizal relationship with an unidentified fungus in order to germinate. The fungus transfers nutrients to the embryo, and the plant may continue to obtain nutrients from its fungal associate even after producing photosynthetic shoots.

=== Pollination ===
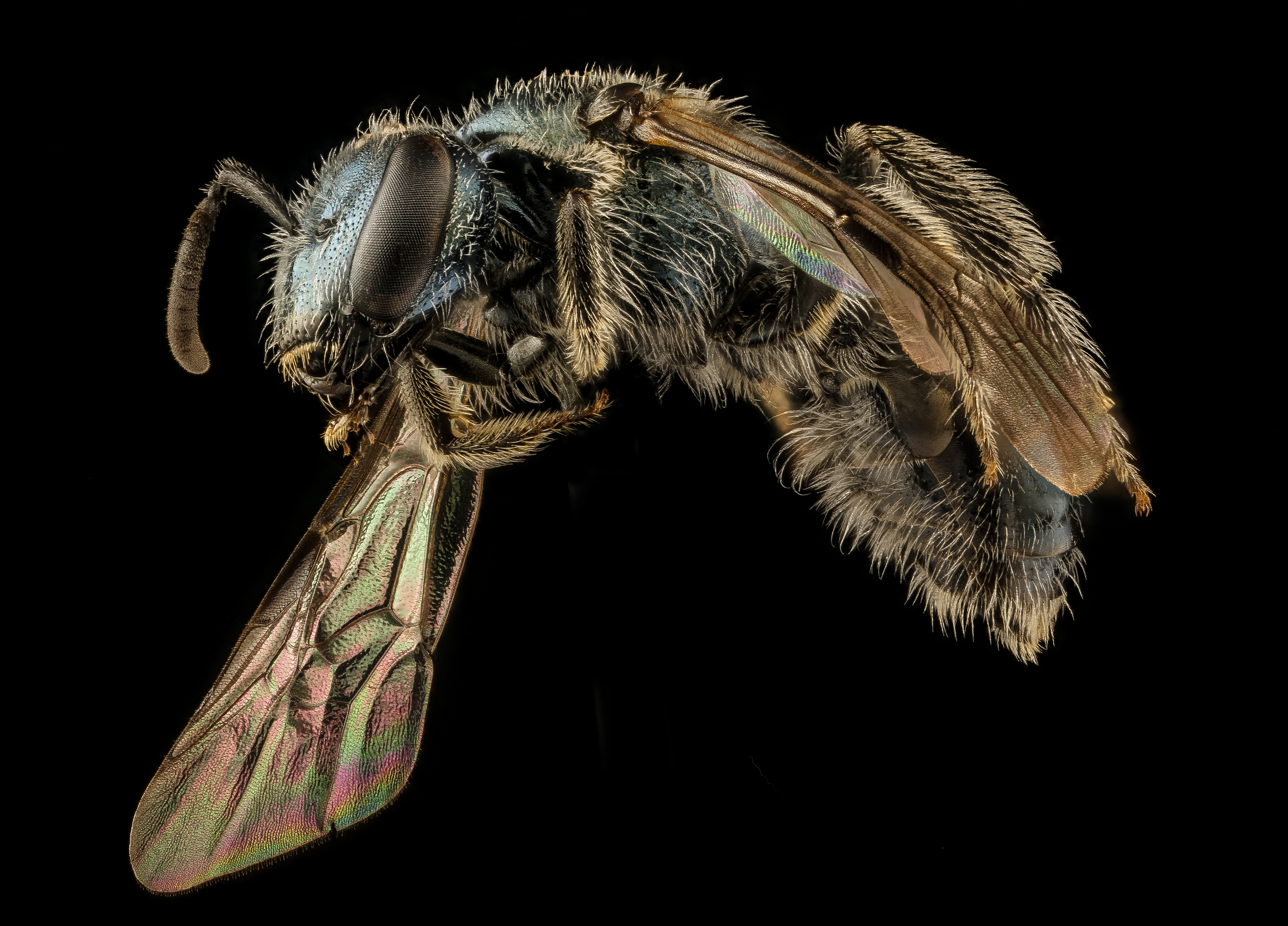
Lasioglossum coeruleum, one of the only insects known to pollinate Cypripedium arietinum

The only known pollinators are sweat bees in the subgenus Dialictus, including Lasioglossum coeruleum, which are attracted to the flower by its fragrance. These bees enter the lip, where they are trapped for up to two minutes. While attempting to exit the flower, pollen is deposited on their dorsal thorax, and any pollen they carry from visiting another flower is transferred to the orchid's stigma. As with other species of Cypripedium, the flower offers no known benefit to its pollinators.

=== Associations with other species ===
Herbivory by white-tailed deer significantly impacts the health of Cypripedium arietinum populations, especially in early successional forests where deer are abundant. Slugs have also been documented feeding on the plants. Heavily browsed plants do not send up flowering stems the following year, reducing a population's ability to reproduce.

== Conservation ==
=== Population statuses and trends ===
There are approximately 430 known wild populations globally, most with few individuals but some with over a thousand plants, and the total number of plants globally is estimated between 10,000 and 100,000. Of the known sites where plants grow, 71 have enhanced legal protections (for example, designated natural areas), including 63 on public land. While long-term survey data is needed to better understand population trends, some surveys suggest that many populations may currently be stable but have experienced significant declines over the past few generations (59% in Nova Scotia and 10–30% in Quebec).

Cypripedium arietinum is a species of conservation concern in every state and province across its range, and NatureServe lists the species globally vulnerable. Ontario and Michigan host the greatest number of known populations, and the species is rare and threatened in both jurisdictions. In Minnesota, habitat destruction extirpated the species from several counties where it once occurred; the state listed C. arietinum as an endangered species in 1984 but reclassified it as a threatened species in 1996. In all of the remaining western states and provinces across its range—Wisconsin, Saskatchewan, and Manitoba—the species is listed as imperiled. In Quebec, populations are concentrated in the southern parts of the province along with a large disjunct population on Anticosti Island, and the species is listed as threatened. Of the 26 historical populations of C. arietinum in New York, only half are still extant, and the species is listed as threatened or imperiled. Maine, New Hampshire, and Massachusetts all list the species as endangered, and Vermont lists it as a threatened species. Only one population has ever been documented in Connecticut, and the species is now extirpated from the state. Over 1,344 plants were counted across six known sites in Nova Scotia, where the species has declined due to habitat loss from gypsum mining and is listed as endangered. The geographic isolation of these sites, which are 330 km (210 mi) from the nearest populations in Maine, means that they may be genetically distinct and are of special conservation value.

=== Known threats ===
Habitat loss and alteration is the most significant threat to the conservation of Cypripedium arietinum. For example, the clearing of jack pine forests in northwestern Minnesota and mining in Minnesota and Nova Scotia contributed to the loss of some populations and may continue to pose future threats. Changes to hydrology caused by gravel mining in Maine and by the construction of impoundments in Wisconsin have contributed to population declines. Because the species prefers mid-successional forests and grows in partial shade, it is vulnerable to clearcutting and to over-shading as the forest canopy closes. Therefore, careful forest management practices such as canopy thinning are important for the conservation of some populations.

Poaching is another major threat to this species. Because it is difficult to grow from seed, nearly all commercially available plants historically were collected from the wild, although this may change with advances in propagation techniques. Because of its delicate ecological requirements, few plants survive transplanting. As its habitat becomes more accessible to the public, increasing public awareness of the conservation needs of C. arietinum is one proposed strategy for mitigating threats from poaching and collecting. Despite some populations occurring along trails used by hikers and off-road vehicles, there have been no reports of damage to those populations from trampling.

Other species, both native and invasive, pose moderate threats. Browsing by deer, whose numbers have increased recently in areas where the plant grows, can cause C. arietinum not to send up leaves or flowers the next year. Herbivory by invasive slug species and changes to the soil ecology caused by invasive earthworm species have both been identified as threats. Invasive species like Carex flacca, Rhamnus cathartica, Lonicera morrowii, and Berberis thunbergii, all of which grow aggressively and form dense monocultures, can crowd out or over-shade Cypripedium arietinum.

Climate change has also been identified as a significant threat to the species, but its specific impacts are poorly understood.
