= Lasioglossum semiviride =

Scientific classification
- Kingdom: Animalia
- Phylum: Arthropoda
- Class: Insecta
- Order: Hymenoptera
- Family: Halictidae
- Tribe: Halictini
- Genus: Lasioglossum
- Species: L. semiviride

Binomial name
- Lasioglossum semiviride (Friese, 1909)

Species of bee

Lasioglossum semiviride is a species of sweat bee in the subgenus Dialictus..

== Description ==
This bee is known to feed on fennel (Foeniculum sp.)

== Distribution ==
It has only been found in Bermuda and has not been seen or recorded in over a century.
