= Deforestation in Costa Rica =

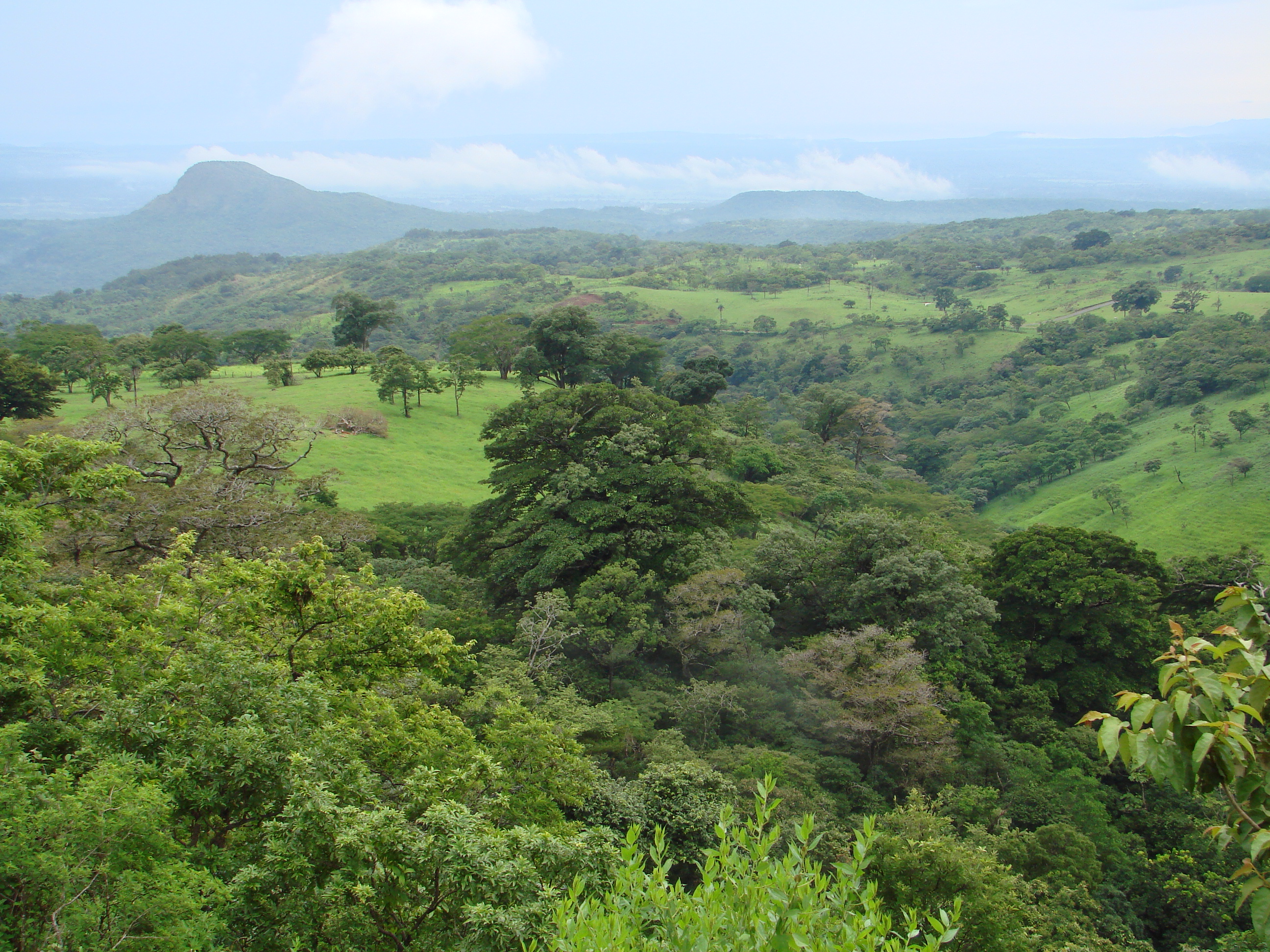
Costa Rica's tropical landscape

Deforestation is a major threat to biodiversity and ecosystems in Costa Rica. The country has a rich biodiversity with some 12,000 species of plants, 1,239 species of butterflies, 838 species of birds, 440 species of reptiles and amphibians, and 232 species of mammals, which have been under threat from the effects of deforestation. Agricultural development, cattle ranching, and logging have caused major deforestation as more land is cleared for these activities. Despite government efforts to mitigate deforestation, it continues to cause harm to the environment of Costa Rica by impacting flooding, soil erosion, desertification, and loss of biodiversity.

== History ==
The land currently being used for forestry in Costa Rica was at one point used by the Cabécar People. Like many other native cultures, they used slash and burn agriculture to manage their small-scale agriculture. In the early 1900s, companies based in England began to encroach on the Cabecars' land to use it for coffee plantations. These plantations relied on labor from both the indigenous peoples and the Mestizos. With this came government pressure to increase the land used for timber production in order to boost the country's economy. This policy was continued until the 1990s, when government regulations were spearheaded to create national parks and forest reserves.

The history of the Costa Rican forests can be difficult to discover, due to the gaps in research and data. However, several counts have been taken of the forests that have been used in timber production from the years 1940 to 1983. Despite these numbers, the actual percentage of deforestation cannot be known for certain because these counts were taken using aerial imaging over the land legally designated for Costa Rica's timber export. By 1940, over 75% of the available land zoned for forestry was being used for either timber or agricultural production. Again, the true count cannot be known due to illegal logging.

Year	Percentage of forest remaining
1940	67%
1950	56%
1961	43%
1977	32%
1983	17%

== Causes ==
=== Cattle Ranching ===
When the population of Costa Rica increased in the 1950s and meat prices increased around the globe, the citizens began cutting down the forests to provide pasture for cattle ranching and beef for export, which generated revenue for Costa Rica. Since the 1950s, pasture land expanded by approximately 62% meaning huge amounts of forest had been cleared to make room for cattle ranching causing Costa Rica to have one of the highest deforestation rates in the world during the 1960s. The problem was worsened because during the 1960s, the United States offered Costa Rican cattle ranchers millions of dollars in loans to produce beef. However, following a collapse of the meat market in the 1980s, Costa Rica experienced an increase in abandoned farm land. Despite these downfalls, cattle ranching still persists in Costa Rica and in 2017 35.5% of landmass was being used for grazing and 30% of estimated greenhouse gas emissions were from livestock.

=== Agriculture ===
While cattle ranching is a significant cause of deforestation in Costa Rica, agriculture and cash crop productions, namely banana plantations, have also significantly contributed to the problem. Lowland rainforest has been most affected where 130,000 acres (530 km2) of previously forested land (primarily in the Atlantic and Northern regions) have been removed.

=== Population Dynamics ===
Although most of the larger plantations in Costa Rica are owned by large companies, often multinationals, population pressure in Costa Rica has increased the demand for land as poor citizens are forced to venture out into rural and forested areas. In the 1990s, it was found that the role of population dynamics had a greater influence on the continued deforestation than the growing population. The economic crisis in the 1980s saw a decline in migration into the city and more poor people with no land moving to abandoned farms and other rural lands. This added to the environmental degradation in forest areas and further deforestation along roads as people began to encroach on forested areas. In the Osa Peninsula peasants squatted 10,000 hectares until President Daniel Oduber Quirós created the Corcovado National Park.

=== Lack of Government Intervention ===
While certain conservation laws have been passed in Costa Rica, the government lacks the resources to enforce them.

Over half of Costa Rica's existing forest cover today is under the protection of national parks, biological reserves, or wildlife refuges. However, a prominent contribution in regard to deforestation is the privately owned plots, which occupy the other half, that are subject to little government regulation. Lenient laws on land and amendments to forestry law makes it easy to obtain legal logging concessions thus, owners exploit the land to maximize income. Furthermore, incentive programs designed to compensate landowners for ecosystem services and promote conservation efforts have had little influence on minimizing deforestation rates.

== Effects ==
Deforestation in Costa Rica has a very serious impact on the environment and therefore may directly or indirectly contribute to flooding, desertification, sedimentation in rivers, loss of wildlife diversity, and the obvious sheer loss of timber. Since the end of World War II, approximately 80% of the forests of Costa Rica have disappeared. Approximately 20,000 acres (8,100 ha) of land are deforested annually; in the 1990s the country had one of the worst deforestation rates in Central America.

The deforestation of Costa Rica's tropical rain forests as in other countries is a threat to life worldwide. Soil erosion has increased with deforestation with the topsoil washed away from the hills into the streams and out into the oceans, year after year.

Industries responsible for agricultural plantations and food production have been synonymous with health risks, notably the high levels of toxic pesticides which affected thousands of plantation workers throughout Central America in the 1970s. Pesticides used to grow bananas and other fruits such as mangoes and citrus fruit may enter the hydrological systems and contaminate the water. The removal of the forest to make way for these fruit plantations may also disrupt the nutrient balance in the soil and through monoculture exhaust the soils and render them unsustainable.

Deforestation, particular from cattle ranching and poor agricultural practices, can cause drought as the removal of trees increases the ground's sun exposure, evaporating more water from the soil and drying up the land. This in turn decreases the amount of water available for transportation, irrigation, and drinking/bathing. Furthermore, as more land is cleared for livestock and pastureland, the resulting deforestation can disrupt the water cycle causing changes in the amount of rainfall and atmospheric moisture which can exacerbate the negative impacts of droughts. On top of that, clearing of trees to support livestock results in more erosion as there are less trees and other plants to hold the soil in place and lock in moisture. Deforestation coupled with unplanned grazing has also decreased the amount of vegetation available to absorb carbon dioxide. Furthermore, the growing number of cattle has increased the amount of methane production, a potent greenhouse gas that heavily contributes to climate change and global warming effects.

Furthermore, little research has been done on the public's understanding of the effects of climate change in countries outside of Europe and North America. The perception of climate change is also understudied, especially in developing countries like Costa Rica. Research shows that people are most concerned about food and water shortages, poverty, and weather conditions (i.e. heat waves) impacting communities now and in the future as a result of climate change. In general the public trend is low knowledge, high concern, yet minimal engagement in preventing the effects of climate change. In Costa Rica, citizens name deforestation as having the biggest impact, followed by ozone layer depletion, fossil fuels, and only a small number naming livestock as a major contributor.

=== Decline of deforestation 1977-2005 ===
The amount of Costa Rican land deforested annually has declined since 1977:

Year	Forest cleared (hectares)
1977	52,000
1983	43,550
1985	42,000
1987	32,000
1991	17,947
1996	18,000
2000	3,033
2005	4,737

== Response ==
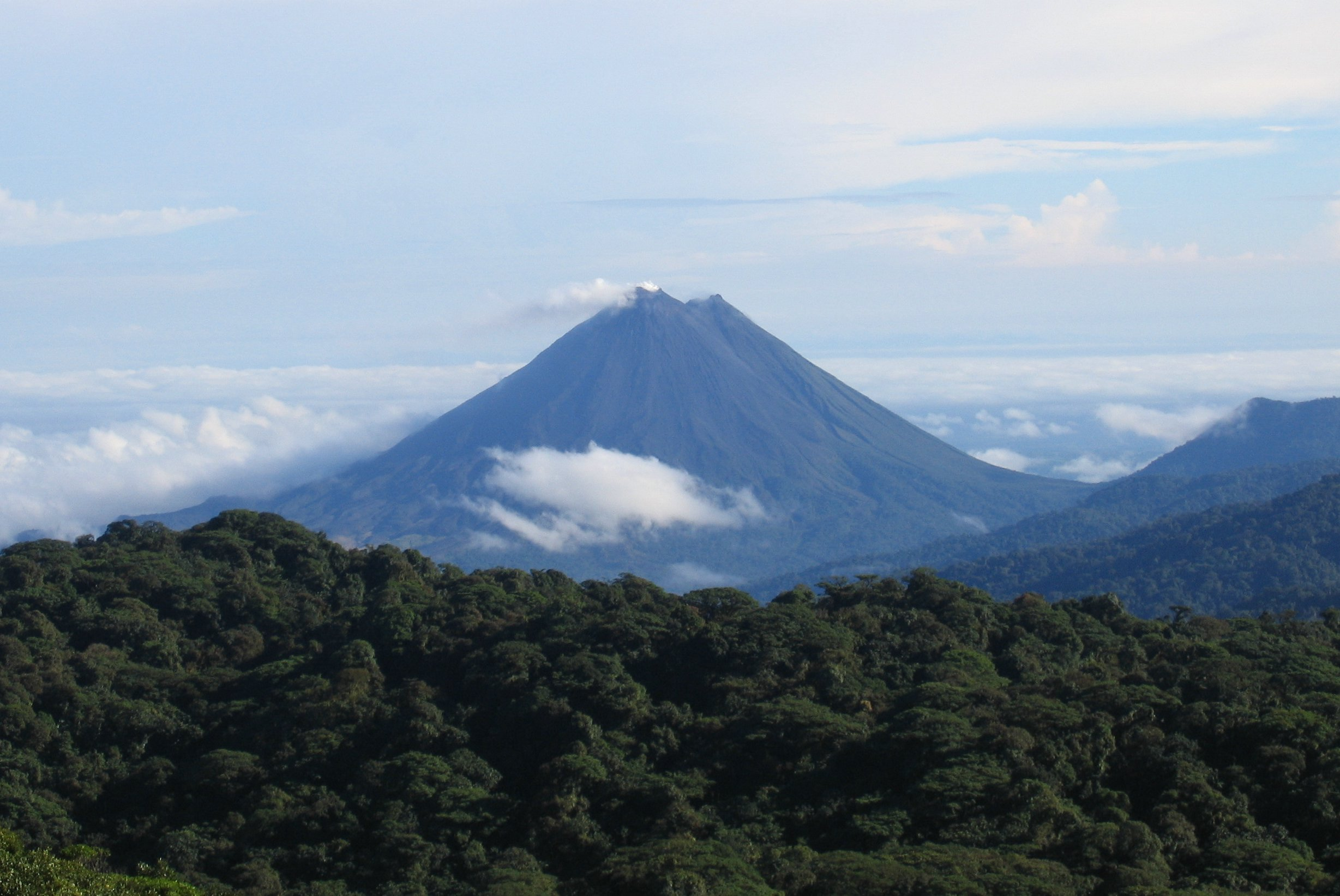
The forests of Arenal Volcano National Park.

The government response in Costa Rica has been lauded by many scientists and climate change researchers as having one of the most effective government programs to combat deforestation. The conservation program in Costa Rica is particularly ambitious and is one of the most developed among tropical rainforest countries. The largest factor contributing to this was the monetary incentives that Costa Rica implemented in order to incentivize land owners to replant trees.

=== PES Program ===
PES (Payments for Environmental Services program) was founded in 1996 in order to pay farmers for implementing practices that protected watersheds and decreased the amount of carbon dioxide released into the atmosphere. The program pays landowners US$64 per hectare of untouched or replanted forest. The PES program utilizes a national tax on fossil fuels to pay for protected forests[]. Despite the government experiencing policy changes, the PES program has remained in place for over 20 years. The program has paid US$524 million to farmers contracted under PES since its inception in 1996. There are three different programs that farmers can benefit from: forest protection, reforestation, sustainable forest management and agroforestry.

The PES program is also celebrated for targeting specific underrepresented groups in land ownership, such as women and indigenous people, to be a part of the program. There are also specific programs that exist to incentivize small farmers to continue their sustainable practices. Those who benefit from the program use the proceeds to improve the quality of life in the farms and surrounding areas.

Despite this, the PES program does have its drawbacks as some farms and villages are unaware of the program because of lack of awareness. Smaller farms may be less inclined to be used for the PES program if there is little carbon dioxide reduction possible for those particular areas. Certain regulations and standards also decrease the amount of farms that are able to participate in the program.

=== National Bamboo Project ===
The National Bamboo Project of Costa Rica was founded in 1986 to help decrease deforestation. The scheme aims at reducing deforestation by means of replacing timber with bamboo as a primary building material and providing low cost housing for Costa Rica's rural poor. By cultivating and building with Guadua species, indigenous giant bamboos, the National Bamboo Project was able to raise thousands of new homes for the poor, benefit the environment, and advance bamboo-based building technology.

In a number of parts of Costa Rica, areas that were bare ten years ago have now been reforested. Many non-government conservation organizations are working in the country to prevent deforestation and further these efforts of preservation and restoration. The country has also significantly taken advantage of ecotourism, taking the initiative to raise revenue through tourism while still protecting the forests. Today, while deforestation rates have declined greatly from the 1990s with increased conservation efforts and such schemes, the remaining forests still face threats from illegal logging even in protected areas and land cleared for agriculture and cattle pasture in unprotected areas. Corruption exists in Costa Rica, but this problem is much lower than in many other Latin American countries.

== Tree cover extent and loss ==
Global Forest Watch publishes annual estimates of tree cover loss and 2000 tree cover extent derived from time-series analysis of Landsat satellite imagery in the Global Forest Change dataset. In this framework, tree cover refers to vegetation taller than 5 m (including natural forests and tree plantations), and tree cover loss is defined as the complete removal of tree cover canopy for a given year, regardless of cause.

For Costa Rica, country statistics report cumulative tree cover loss of 287,005 ha (2,870.05 km^{2}) from 2001 to 2024 (about 7.3% of its 2000 tree cover area). For tree cover density greater than 30%, country statistics report a 2000 tree cover extent of 3,913,126 ha (39,131.26 km^{2}). The charts and table below display this data. In simple terms, the annual loss number is the area where tree cover disappeared in that year, and the extent number shows what remains of the 2000 tree cover baseline after subtracting cumulative loss. Forest regrowth is not included in the dataset.

Annual tree cover loss in Costa Rica, 2001–2024. View chart definition.
Tree cover extent in 2000 minus cumulative tree cover loss in Costa Rica, 2001–2024 (loss-only residual; does not account for gain). View chart definition.

Annual tree cover extent and loss
Year	Tree cover extent (km2) (Note: This residual measure does not include forest regrowth.)	Annual tree cover loss (km2)
2001	38,976.43	154.83
2002	38,843.43	133.00
2003	38,760.65	82.78
2004	38,662.98	97.67
2005	38,497.64	165.34
2006	38,397.06	100.58
2007	38,282.42	114.64
2008	38,063.51	218.91
2009	37,839.23	224.28
2010	37,707.45	131.78
2011	37,602.40	105.05
2012	37,498.52	103.88
2013	37,420.62	77.90
2014	37,311.53	109.09
2015	37,278.52	33.01
2016	37,140.09	138.43
2017	36,919.58	220.51
2018	36,796.24	123.34
2019	36,681.34	114.90
2020	36,598.86	82.48
2021	36,520.34	78.52
2022	36,434.72	85.62
2023	36,344.21	90.51
2024	36,261.21	83.00

== REDD+ forest reference level and monitoring ==
Costa Rica has submitted national forest reference emission level/forest reference level benchmarks under the UNFCCC REDD+ framework. These benchmarks are used in the context of results-based payments and each submission is subject to a UNFCCC technical assessment. On the UNFCCC REDD+ Web Platform, Costa Rica’s 2025 submission is listed as having an assessed reference level, with its National REDD+ Strategy, safeguards reporting, and a reported national forest monitoring system.

Costa Rica’s first national FREL/FRL (submitted in 2016 and modified during the technical assessment) covered “reducing emissions from deforestation” and “enhancement of forest carbon stocks” at national scale, using two contiguous historical reference periods (1986–1996 and 1997–2009). The assessed benchmarks were 14,911,467 t CO2 eq per year for the 1986–1996 reference period (for results-based actions in 1997–2009) and 4,365,160 t CO2 eq per year for the 1997–2009 reference period (for 2010–2025). The technical assessment reports that the FREL/FRL included above-ground biomass, below-ground biomass, dead wood (above ground) and litter, while excluding soil organic carbon and harvested wood products (HWP).

In 2025, Costa Rica submitted an updated national FREL/FRL (reference period 2010–2019) that expanded the scope to include “reducing emissions from forest degradation”, alongside deforestation and enhancement of forest carbon stocks. The technical assessment reports an assessed (modified) FREL/FRL of 76,938 t CO2 eq per year, revised from −592,127 t CO2 eq per year in the original submission, noting that the net benchmark combines emissions from deforestation and degradation with removals from enhancement of forest carbon stocks.

== Decentralization efforts ==
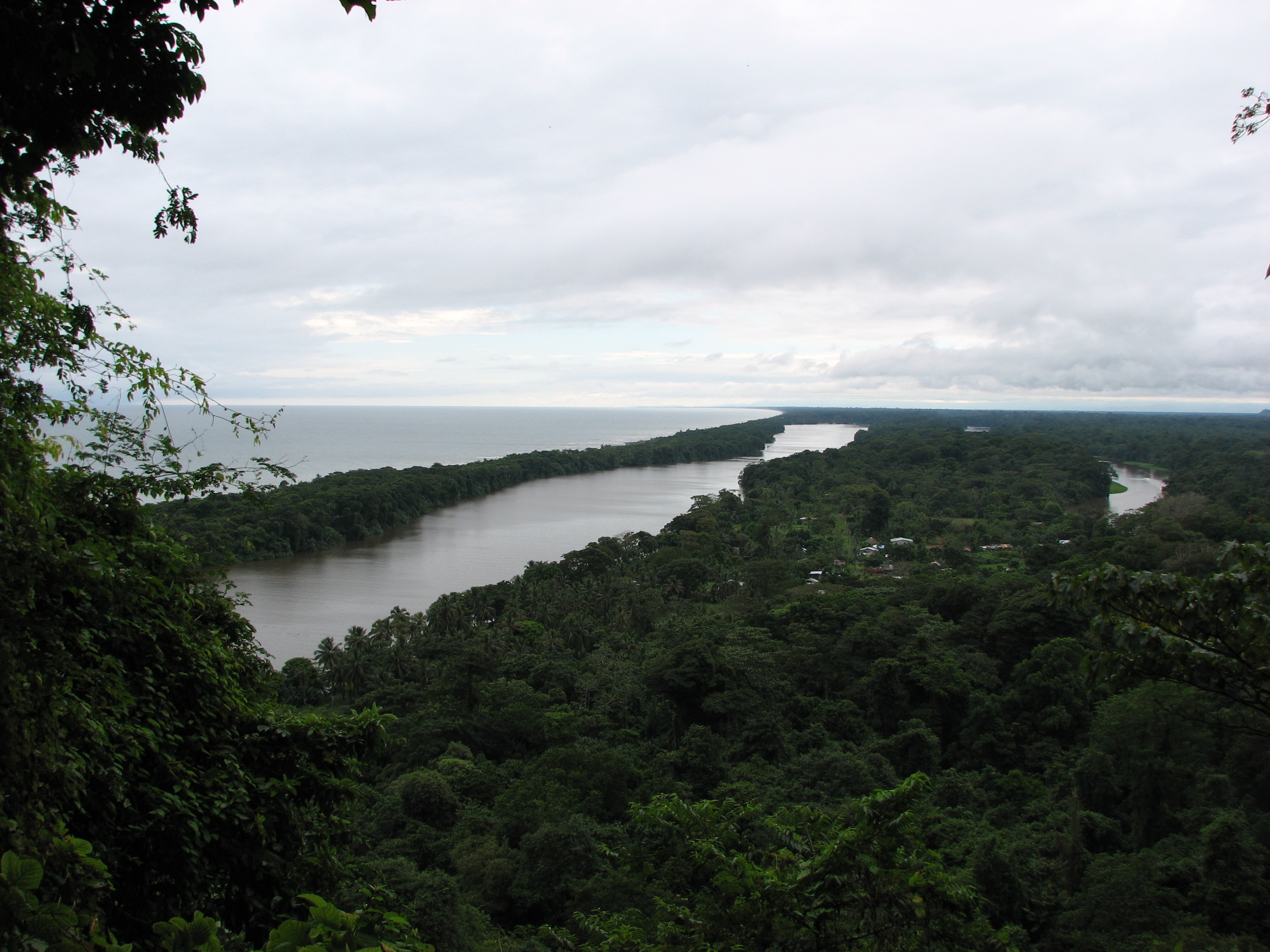
One of Costa Rica's many national parks to protect biodiversity and habitat loss, Tortuguero National Park.

Decentralized decision-making is being practiced in Costa Rica to improve protected area management and biodiversity conservation. Costa Rica stands out among all developing tropical countries for its commitment toward environmental and natural resources issues. The central government has developed a protected area system that has given some kind of protected status to 25% of its national territory. In the mid-nineties the Costa Rican government started to decentralize management and decision-making of all protected areas in the country to promote locally based biodiversity conservation governance. All protected areas were grouped in eleven regionally based administrative units and were labeled as conservation areas. The central government gave each conservation area the authority to exercise significant degrees of autonomy to design and implement policy for the management of the protected areas under their jurisdiction.

== See also ==
- Wildlife of Costa Rica
