= Squatting in Costa Rica =

Costa Rica marked on globe in green

Squatting in Costa Rica was used by settlers to expand the frontier. It was regulated in law and then criminalised in 1961, yet occupations continued, in particular peasants using land invasions to gain property for living and farming. In the 1990s squatters clashed with absentee landlords.

== History ==
Squatting in Costa Rica began as settlers expanded the frontier. It was legitimated as a means to access land by laws enacted in 1885 and 1888. As in most Latin American countries, land titles can be acquired in Costa Rica through usucaption. Claimants, amongst them squatters, can present evidence to the court that they have been in continuous and open occupation for ten years and with the support of the neighbours they often gain title. A 1941 ordinance (Ley de informaciones posesorias) declared that a maximum of 300 hectares could be claimed in this way. The following year, the Ley de poseedores en precario was intended to enable owners whose land in the Central Valley had been squatted to claim state-owned areas in replacement. Since the compensation was decided by local land price, huge tracts of cheap frontier land were taken by just twenty owners; they took 512,000 hectares which was 10 per cent of the total land mass.

In the 1950s, peasants found places to live and farm through land invasions. Squatting (and frontier colonisation in general) was criminalised in 1961, yet as the population grew in the 1960s and 1970s, the peasant land grabs increased both in number and scale, aided by urban students. The Osa Peninsula saw many occupations in the early 1970s as peasants took over 10,000 hectares until President Daniel Oduber Quirós created the Corcovado National Park. The park pitted squatters against environmentalists, and the latter won since they had more access to power. In Guanacaste Province, peasants often squatted to gain access to land from the 1950s until the 1980s.

In the 1990s, there were several incidents in which squatters clashed with absentee land-owners from abroad. In one dispute in Pavones, both a US rancher and a campesino (tenant farmer) were killed; in another, a German plantation owner employed vigilantes who evicted squatters and then were disarmed by state forces. Consequently, caretakers were used by foreign owners to protect their properties and in some cases the caretakers themselves took possession as squatters.

== See also ==
- Deforestation in Costa Rica
- History of Costa Rica
