= Lasioglossum aeneiventre =

Scientific classification
- Kingdom: Animalia
- Phylum: Arthropoda
- Clade: Pancrustacea
- Class: Insecta
- Order: Hymenoptera
- Family: Halictidae
- Genus: Lasioglossum
- Species: L. aeneiventre

Binomial name
- Lasioglossum aeneiventre Friese, 1916

Species of bee

Lasioglossum aeneiventre, also known as Dialictus aeneiventre, is a social sweat bee and is part of the family Halictidae of the order Hymenoptera. Found in Central America, it nests mostly on flat ground though sometimes in vertical banks. It is often compared to L. figueresi.

== Taxonomy and phylogeny ==
L. aeneiventre is part of the subfamily Halictinae, of the hymenopteran family Halictidae. The largest, most diverse and recently diverged of the four halictid subfamilies, Halictinae (sweat bees) is made up of five tribes of which L. aeneiventre is part of Halictini, made up of over 2000 species. Genus Lasioglossum is informally divided into two series: the Lasioglossum series and the Hemihalictus, the latter of which L. aeneiventre is a part. L. aeneiventre is part of the subgenus Dialictus which is made up mostly of New World species.

== Description and identification ==
L. aeneiventre is closely related morphologically to L. figueresi. In relation to L. figueresi, it is smaller and can be distinguished by wing color, patterns, punctate, and sternal and genital characteristics. In general, L. aeneiventre differs from other bees by its wings, pubescence, and markings. There are also size differences between those of solitary female nests and those of multi-female nests, with solitary females being bigger than those of multi-female nests.

=== Females ===
Front of insect head diagram

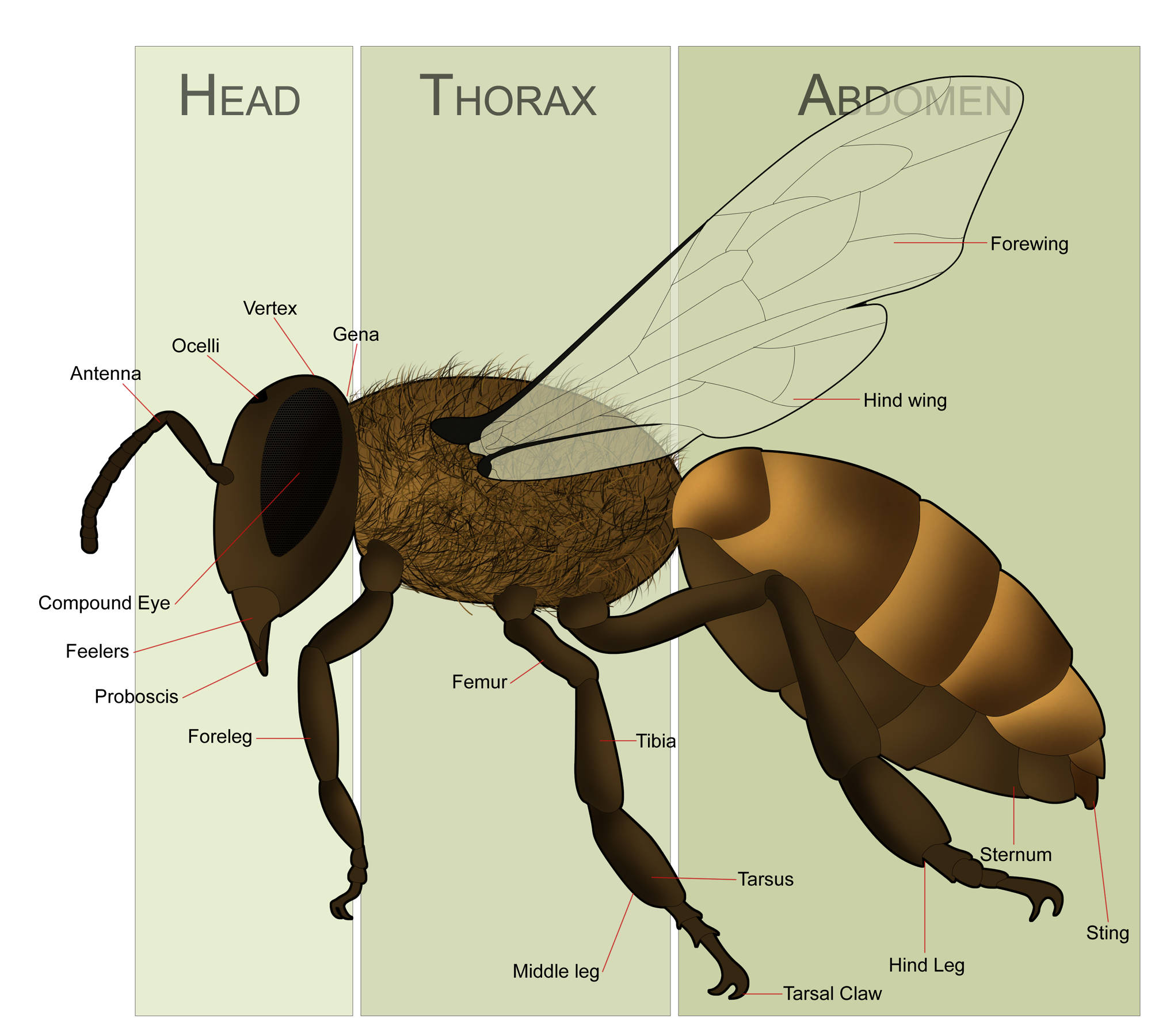
Hymenoptera morphology

A female L. aeneiventre can become a foundress and the queen, a worker, an auxiliary queen, or a replacement queen. In new nests, foundresses have unworn wings and mandibles, while in older multi-female nests, one female normally has worn wings while the other females do not. A female with worn wings has most likely survived from the previous generation. There is also seasonal size variation with emerging female offspring as big as solitary females in late April and May compared to being smaller earlier in the year.

A female L. aeneiventre is recognized by its unique striped pattern on the front part of its mesothorax, the pattern of punctures on its front scutum of its middle thoracic segment, its larger size, its hair, and its slightly yellow wings including the membrane, veins, and stigma. Generally larger than males, it has a metallic dark-green head and a clypeal length greater than that of its supraclypeal area, which is slightly rounded and bulges. It does not have a frontal line ridge from below the base of the antenna to about half the distance between its antennal sockets to its median ocellus, and its lateral ocelli are slightly nearer to each other than to their compound eyes. It has punctures near its eyes, on the lower half of the clypeus, sometimes on the supraclypeal area, on the front part of its mesothorax and on the frons, while its gena and the interspaces of its supraclypeal area are shiny and its frons has dull spaces in between. In the middle of its thorax, it has a groove that is two-thirds the length of its metallic dark-green scutum of its middle thoracic segment, with deep punctures that divide as one moves towards the head, as well as about twelve stripes on each side which almost wrap around the propodeum. Its black metasoma is shiny and mostly smooth, its brown-tinted black legs are shiny and flattened on the front surface with a well-defined rim raised above the surface of the plate at the base of the tarsus, and its sharply rounded wings have dull yellow membranes with smokey tips. Its veins and stigma are brown. It has yellowish hair on its head, abundant white hair on its mesosoma, long, plumose, and golden hair on its metanotum, metasomal terga, and metasoma, white, short, and fine hair on its tegula, white fringed hair on the pseudopygidial area, and a dense golden band of hair on its pronotal lobe.

=== Males ===
A male L. figueresi is distinct from other Dialictus by many of the female characteristics as well as those of its genitals. In comparison to a female, its compound eyes on its dark-green head converge more below and become wavy, and it has punctures on the clypeal area, vertex, and frons. Its scutum of its middle thoracic segment is widely separated by dull ground in the front and middle regions and has a deeply grooved middle line and a parapsidal line like in the female, its clypeus is dark green-purple with dark brown antennae that are lighter underneath, it has a brownish black tegula, and its terga has very close punctures with a shiny terga I-IV. Compared to the females, the male's wings are clearer, its veins are nearly brown, and its yellow to golden-yellow hair is sparser.

== Distribution and habitat ==
L. aeneiventre is a tropical bee that nests in the ground of highly disturbed, highly populated, and highly cultivated areas of Costa Rica's Mesenta Central. The nests are made of material that is easily accessible from their location. This region's weather consists of a dry season from late November or December until April or May and a subsequent wet season with a small period of less rain. They are found in groups of nests that are normally in flat ground but are occasionally in vertical banks.

=== Nest structure ===
The nests of L. aeneiventre are made up of Earthen material, usually found close together. Symmetrical piles of dirt often surround the entrances of nests in flat ground and older nests in vertical banks, though these mounds are easily washed away by the rains. On flat ground, entrances are perpendicular to the surrounding land and descend straight down with only slight deviation or extend 10 to 18 cm in vertical banks. Older nests might also contain branches off the main tunnel. Cells 9 to 11 mm long and 3 to 4 mm in diameter bud off from the main tunnel without lateral tunnels. Due to used cells being plugged or filled with soil if they contain feces, old cells are considered not to be reused. There are also differences between solitary female nests and multi-female nests. Solitary female nests, generally newly created, have shorter tunnels and less cells than multi-female nests.

== Colony cycle ==
Unlike L. figueresi, L. aeneiventre function year-round, having up to three broods a year. They are only inhibited in October and November due to heavy rains. At the beginning of the dry season (late November to early December), a few new nests are created probably by newly emerged bees, while the majority of recently used nests are utilized again. These nests can expand up to 66 cells and 14 females by the end of the dry season in May. Females emerge from their nests in September and mate with other males; afterward they become inactive, only provisioning their cells during favorable weather. Males are seen throughout the year, and on average, about half of females in a nest in a given year are mated. The first broods of a year come out in late February. It also takes about 35 days for a larva to become an adult.

== Development and reproduction ==
The majority of solitary female L. aeneiventre found between June and October are mated with oocytes beginning to develop and sperm in their spermathecae. Development, however, starts with the larvae, feeding on pollen and nectar, in the nest. As they grow, males and females live together. When they become adults at around 35 days, they leave the nest and mate with others. Large solitary females produce smaller female offspring. However, there is no relation between body size and ovarian development.

== Behavior and ecology ==
The behavior of L. aeneiventre varies among nests and seasons. Nests can be of different sizes and can have solitary females to "primitively eusocial" females, meaning that the queen nudges outside workers to draw them back into the nest for easier stimulus by the queen. Sometimes outside female L. aeneiventre usurp existing queens from their nests and take over operations. It is unlikely that altitude has a strong effect on the social organization of L. aeneiventre.

=== Social organization ===
Nests can be maintained by one or more female L. aeneiventre. In solitary female nests, normally created at the beginning of the dry season, offspring emerge in late January and February. Female offspring would either emerge, mate, and found new colonies, or stay in the nest and become workers, auxiliary queens, or replacement queens. In nests headed by more than one female, there are more cells, and there is significant positive correlation between active cells per female and the number of females in the nest, suggesting that having more females leads to more efficient building and provisioning of cells.

=== Circadian activity ===
Female L. aeneiventre begin their day between 7:30 and 8 AM when the temperature is greater than 18 °C (64 °F). They sit partly out of the entrance to their nest, most likely warming up their muscles needed for flight, and then forage until 2:30 to 3 PM. This activity occurs on clear or partly cloudy days yet stops during rain and low hanging clouds.

== Interaction with other species ==
L. aeneiventre interacts with plants and parasites. Plants provide it with pollen and nectar as food for both themselves and their larvae, while parasites invade their nests and affect their survival. They are parasitized much less than L. figueresi; however they are more likely to be parasitized than bees living above the ground due to nest site.

=== Diet ===
The diet of L. aeneiventre from larvae to adults consists of loaves of pollen mixed with nectar. The loaves can be made from different pollen sources due to the cooperative nature of provisioning and indicates that the pollen does come from different flowering plants.

=== Parasites ===
There are several potential parasites of L. aeneiventre. Fly larvae (Diptera) and nematodes are found in some cells, and Conopidae and Strepsiptera are found internally in adult females. Additionally, the parasitic fly Phalacrotophora was seen flying at nests sites and could therefore be another parasite.
