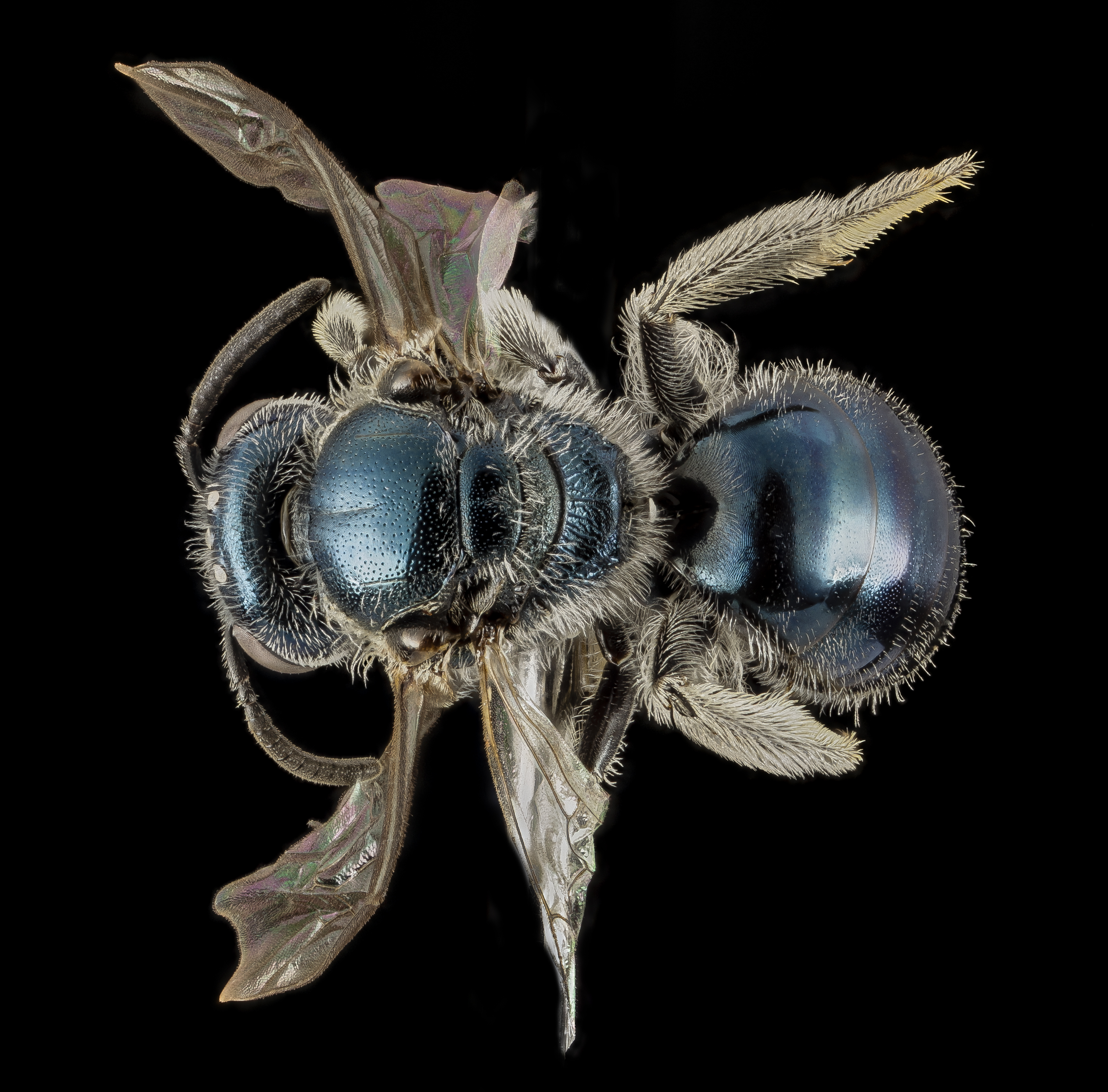

Scientific classification
- Domain: Eukaryota
- Kingdom: Animalia
- Phylum: Arthropoda
- Class: Insecta
- Order: Hymenoptera
- Family: Halictidae
- Tribe: Halictini
- Genus: Lasioglossum
- Species: L. coeruleum

Binomial name
- Lasioglossum coeruleum (Robertson, 1893)

= Lasioglossum coeruleum =

Species of bee

Lasioglossum coeruleum is a species of sweat bee in the family Halictidae.
