= National Bamboo Project of Costa Rica =

The National Bamboo Project of Costa Rica was established in 1986 with the dual aims of reducing deforestation by means of replacing timber with bamboo as a primary building material and providing low cost housing for Costa Rica's rural poor.

== Achievement ==
By cultivating and building with an indigenous form of giant bamboo called Guadua, the National Bamboo Project was able to raise thousands of new homes for the poor, benefit the environment, and advance bamboo-based building technology.

In 1995, the National Bamboo Project was handed over to the FUNBAMBU Foundation to maintain and continue the project's mission of creating low-cost bamboo housing.

== See also ==
- Forest Research Centre for Bamboo and Rattan
