= Dialictus =

- L. obscurum/L. planatum

Scientific classification
- Kingdom: Animalia
- Phylum: Arthropoda
- Class: Insecta
- Order: Hymenoptera
- Family: Halictidae
- Genus: Lasioglossum
- Subgenus: Dialictus; Robertson, 1902

Subgenus of insects

Dialictus is a subgenus of sweat bees belonging to the genus Lasioglossum. Most of the members of this subgenus have a metallic appearance, while some are non-metallic. There are over 630 species worldwide. They are commonly found in the Northern Hemisphere and are found in abundance in North America. Members of this subgenus also have very diverse forms of social structure making them model organisms for studying the social behavior of bees.

== Morphology ==
Members of Lasioglossum (Dialictus) are small, about 3.4–8.1 mm in size, and distinguished from other halictids by weakened distal veins on the forewings. Distinguishing between some of the species in Lasioglossum (Dialictus) proves to be difficult due to their "monotonous" morphology and subtle differences. Some species have been named based on geographic distribution and ecological niche rather than using any distinguishing morphological features.

== Molecular ==
Genetic barcoding has developed into a commonly used identification tool for taxonomists, though Lasioglossum (Dialictus) lacks a distinct barcode gap. In addition to this group's subtle morphological differences, this causes identifications to be misleading or difficult to ascertain.

== Ecology ==
=== Solitary vs. communal ===
Though solitary bees such as Lasioglossum figueresi often live in proximity to each other, unlike communal bees, the nests of solitary bees are built by lone females. The female builds the nest and feeds her offspring without workers or help from other bees. Solitary bees often nest in the ground and tree bark. Solitary bees are important pollinators.

Communal bees live in groups of two or more females in a single nest, each of which reproduces and provisions independently.

=== Eusocial ===
Eusocial bees are those in which there are queens, which lay eggs, and workers, which either do not lay eggs, or lay them in much smaller numbers than the queen. Each social behavior is not necessarily exclusive for individual species of Lasioglossum. Some species in other subgenera have shown to exhibit social polymorphism depending on the climate of its habitat. In temperate climates, some female L. (Evylaeus) produce daughters that will remain unfertilized and help with foraging and care for the next generation of offspring. In colder climates, such as at a higher altitude, females of the same species will exhibit solitary behavior and all the daughters produced will be fertile. This is likely because with colder and shorter breeding seasons, the bee does not have enough time to produce two broods. In warmer climates with longer breeding seasons, having two broods, with the first brood caring for the second, can be more efficient.

=== Parasitic ===
A few Dialictus exhibit kleptoparasitism by laying their eggs in another species' brood cells.
