= Outline of Costa Rica =

Country in Central America

The Flag of Costa Rica

The Coat of arms of Costa Rica

The location of Costa Rica

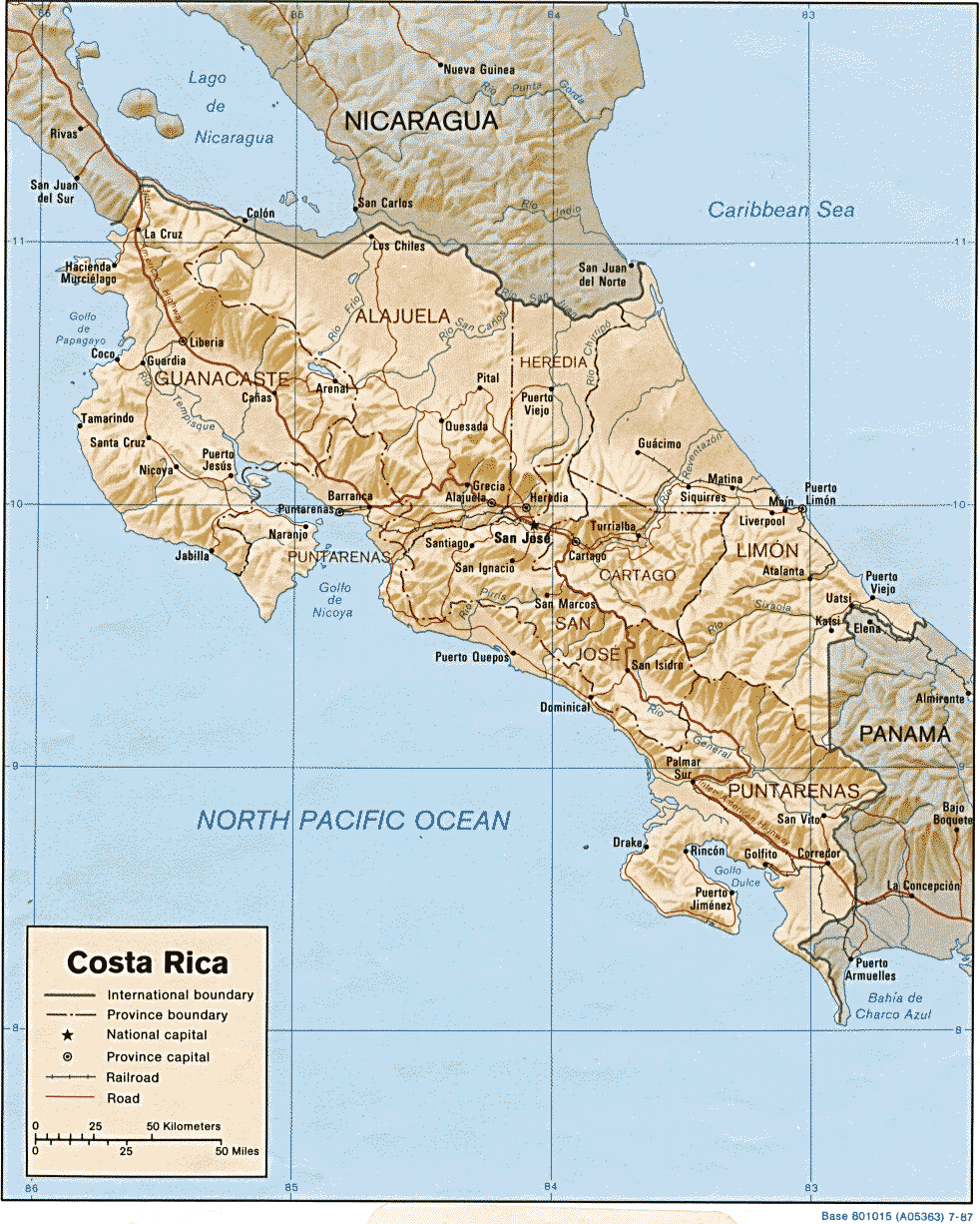
An enlargeable relief map of the Republic of Costa Rica

The following outline is provided as an overview of and topical guide to Costa Rica:

Costa Rica – sovereign country located in Central America, bordered by Nicaragua to the north, Panama to the east-southeast, the Pacific Ocean to the west and south, and the Caribbean Sea to the east. Costa Rica was the first country in the world to constitutionally abolish its army. Among Latin American countries, Costa Rica ranks 4th on the 2007 Human Development Index, and 48th worldwide. Costa Rica is ranked 5th in the world on the 2008 Environmental Performance Index, up from the 15th place in 2006. In 2007 the government stated that it wants Costa Rica to be the first country to become carbon neutral by 2021.

== General reference ==
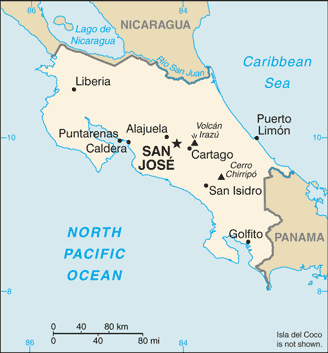
An enlargeable basic map of Costa Rica

- Pronunciation:
- Common English country name: Costa Rica
- Official English country name: The Republic of Costa Rica
- Common endonym(s): Tiquicia
- Official endonym(s):
- Adjectival(s): Costa Rican
- Demonym(s):
- Etymology: Name of Costa Rica
- International rankings of Costa Rica
- ISO country codes: CR, CRI, 188
- ISO region codes: See ISO 3166-2:CR
- Internet country code top-level domain: .cr

== Geography of Costa Rica ==
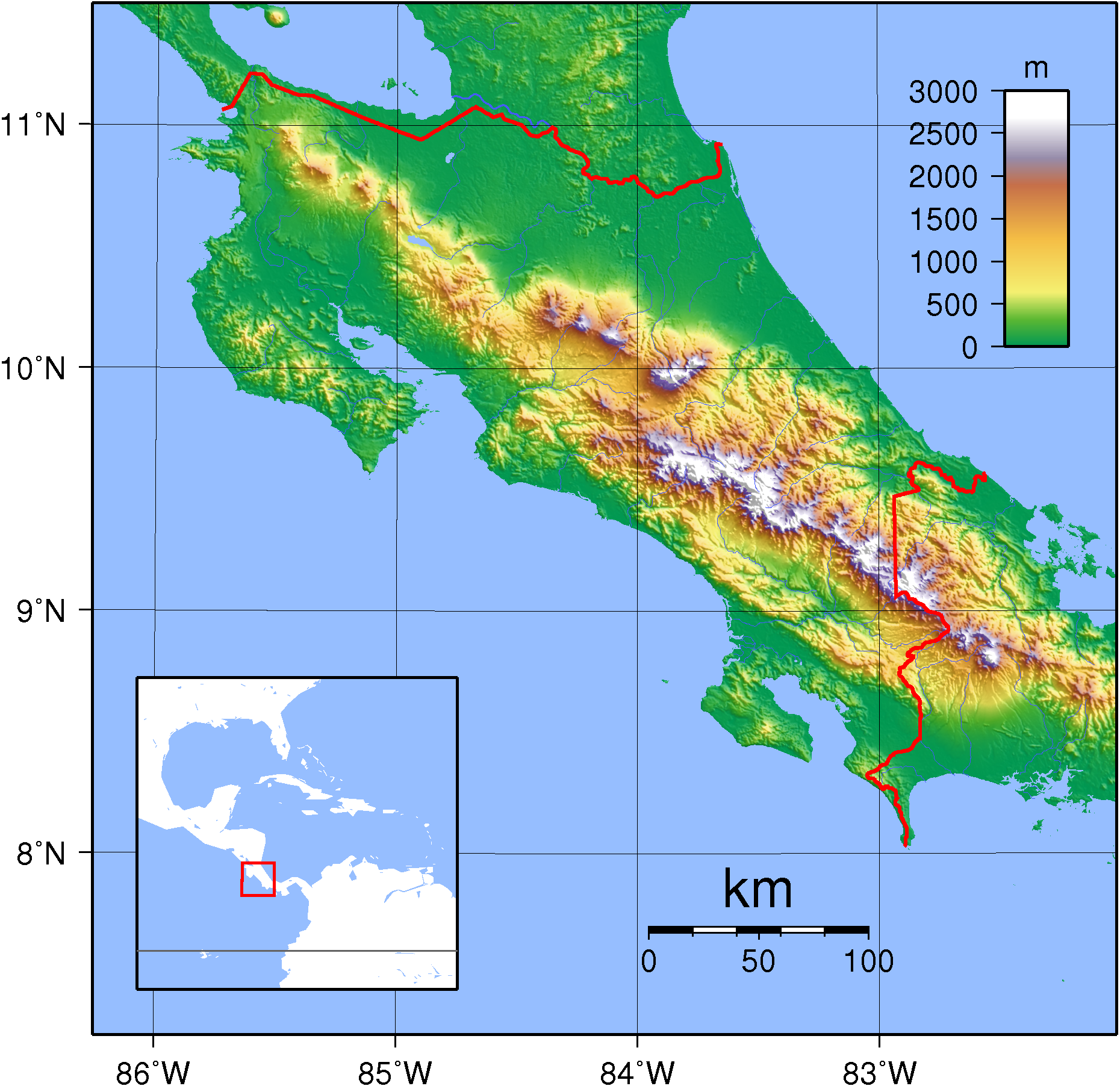
An enlargeable topographic map of Costa Rica

Geography of Costa Rica

- Costa Rica is: a country
- Location:
  - Northern Hemisphere and Western Hemisphere
    - Americas
      - North America
        - Middle America
          - Central America
  - Time zone: UTC-06
  - Extreme points of Costa Rica
    - High: Cerro Chirripó 3,820 m (12,533 ft)
    - Low: North Pacific Ocean and Caribbean Sea 0 m
  - Land boundaries: 639 km

Panama 330 km
Nicaragua 309 km

- Coastline: 1,290 km

- Population of Costa Rica: 4,301,712 (2011 census) - 123rd most populous country
- Area of Costa Rica: 51,180 km^{2}
- Atlas of Costa Rica

=== Environment of Costa Rica ===
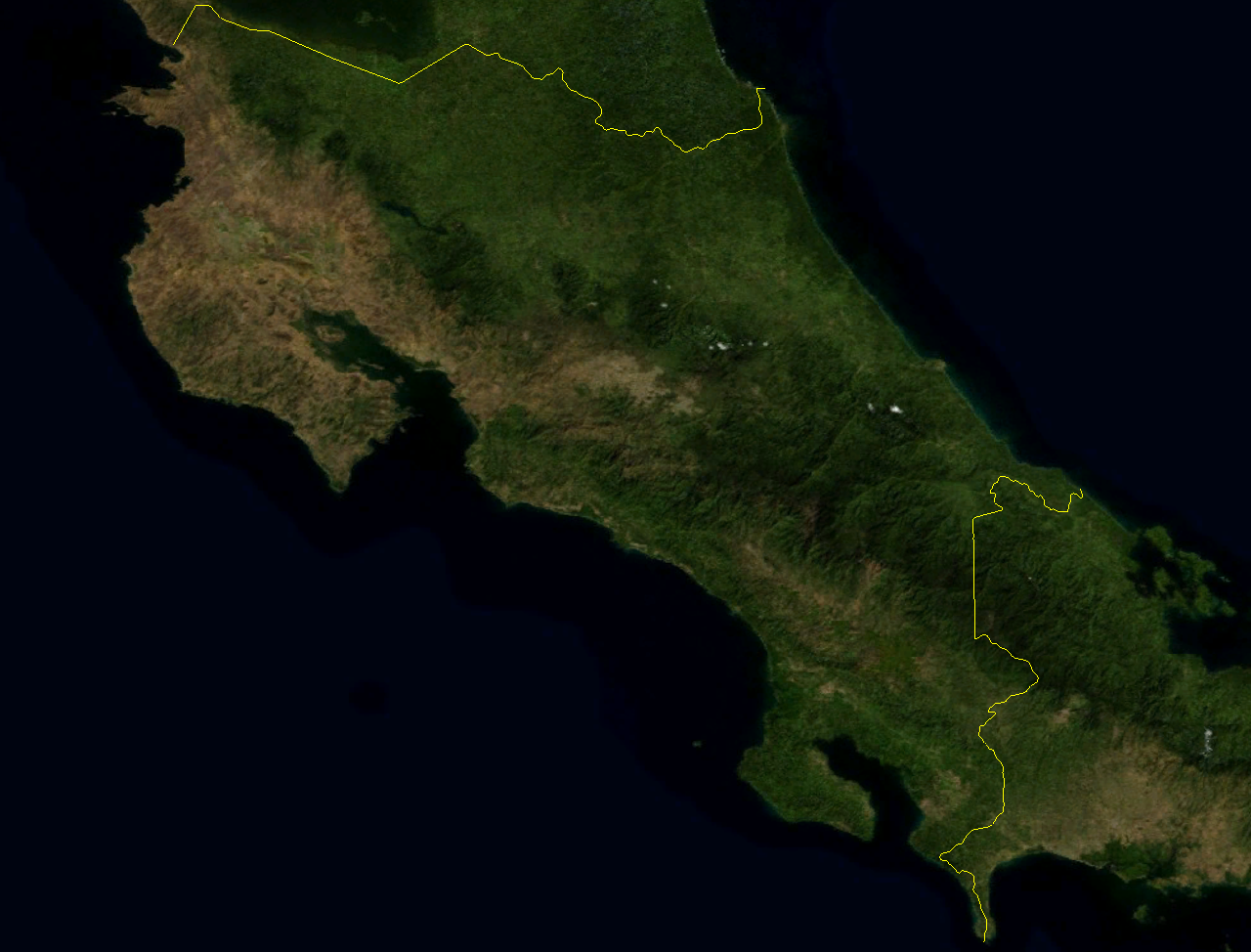
An enlargeable satellite image of Costa Rica

- Climate of Costa Rica
- Deforestation in Costa Rica
- Ecoregions in Costa Rica
- Renewable energy in Costa Rica
- Geology of Costa Rica
- National parks of Costa Rica
- Wildlife of Costa Rica
  - Fauna of Costa Rica
    - Birds of Costa Rica
    - Mammals of Costa Rica
      - Monkeys of Costa Rica

==== Natural geographic features of Costa Rica ====
- Islands of Costa Rica
- Lakes of Costa Rica
- Mountains of Costa Rica
  - Volcanoes in Costa Rica
- Rivers of Costa Rica

=== Regions of Costa Rica ===
==== Ecoregions of Costa Rica ====
List of ecoregions in Costa Rica

- Neotropical tropical and subtropical moist broadleaf forests
  - Central American Atlantic moist forests
  - Cocos Island moist forests
  - Costa Rican seasonal moist forests
  - Isthmian–Atlantic moist forests
  - Isthmian–Pacific moist forests
  - Talamancan montane forests
- Neotropical Tropical and subtropical dry broadleaf forests
  - Central American dry forests
- Neotropical Montane grasslands and shrublands
  - Talamanca Paramo
- Neotropical Mangrove
  - Bocas del Toro–San Bastimentos Island–San Blas mangroves
  - Moist Pacific Coast mangroves
  - Mosquitia–Nicaraguan Caribbean Coast mangroves
  - Rio Negro–Rio San Sun mangroves
  - Southern Dry Pacific Coast mangroves

==== Administrative divisions of Costa Rica ====
===== Provinces of Costa Rica =====
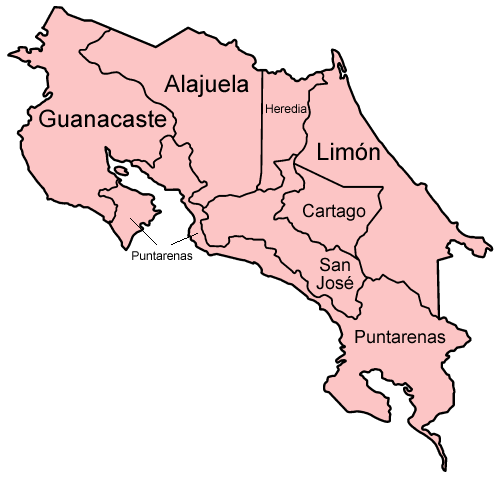

Province	Capital	Primary Region
San José	San José	Central Valley
Alajuela	Alajuela	Northern Plains
Cartago	Cartago	Central Valley
Heredia	Heredia	Central Valley
Guanacaste	Liberia	North Pacific
Puntarenas	Puntarenas	South Pacific
Limón	Limón	Caribbean Coast

===== Districts of Costa Rica =====

- Capital of Costa Rica: San José

=== Demography of Costa Rica ===
Demographics of Costa Rica

== Government and politics of Costa Rica ==
Politics of Costa Rica

- Form of government: presidential representative democratic republic
- Capital of Costa Rica: San José
- Elections in Costa Rica
- Political parties in Costa Rica

=== Branches of government ===
Government of Costa Rica

==== Executive branch of the government of Costa Rica ====
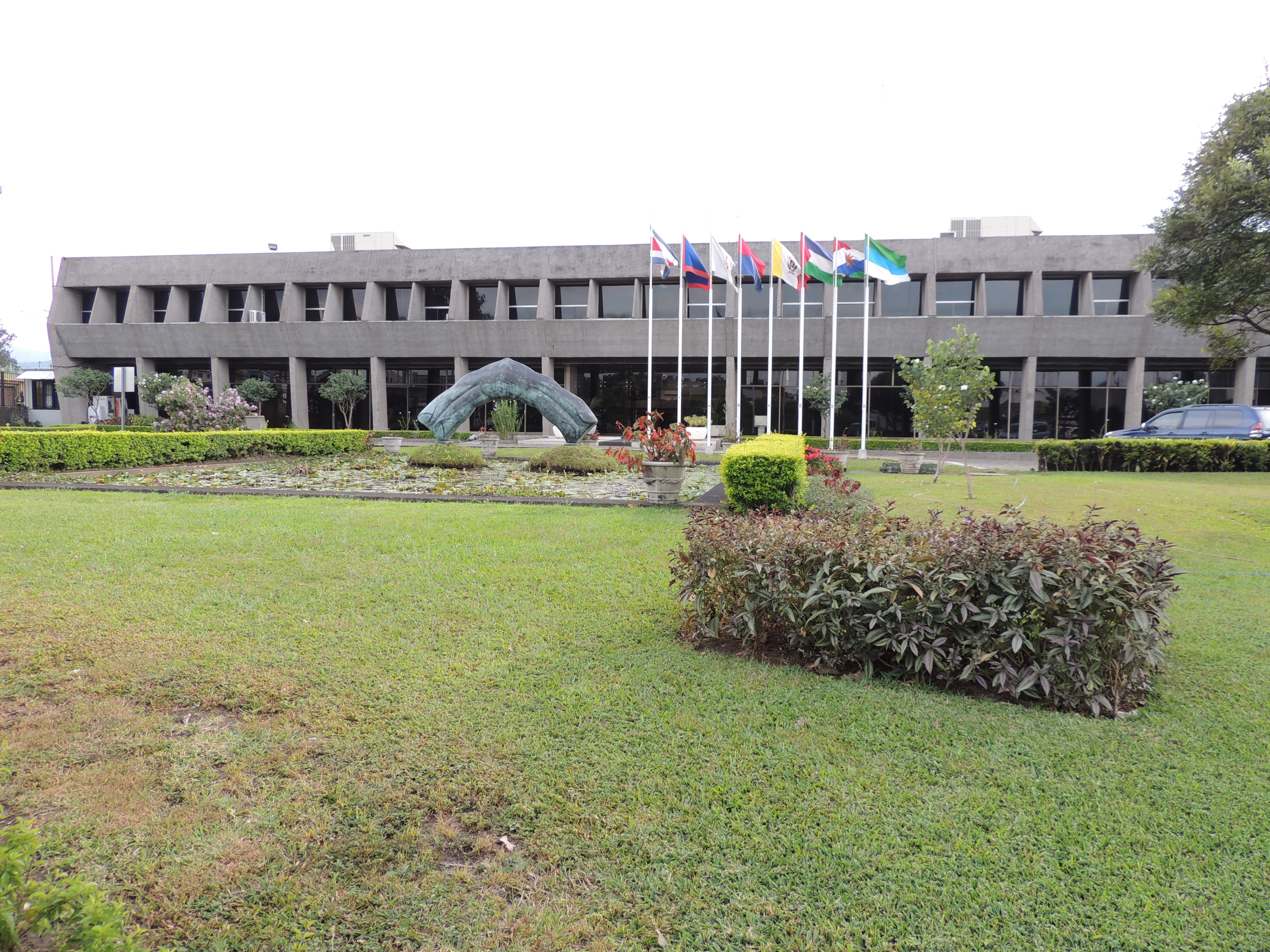

- Head of state and government: President of Costa Rica
- Cabinet of Costa Rica

==== Legislative branch of the government of Costa Rica ====
- Parliament of Costa Rica (unicameral)

==== Judicial branch of the government of Costa Rica ====
Court system of Costa Rica

- Supreme Court of Costa Rica

=== Foreign relations of Costa Rica ===
Foreign relations of Costa Rica

- Diplomatic missions in Costa Rica
- Diplomatic missions of Costa Rica

==== International organization membership ====
The Republic of Costa Rica is a member of:

- Agency for the Prohibition of Nuclear Weapons in Latin America and the Caribbean (OPANAL)
- Central American Bank for Economic Integration (BCIE)
- Central American Common Market (CACM)
- Central American Integration System (SICA)
- Food and Agriculture Organization (FAO)
- Group of 77 (G77)
- Inter-American Development Bank (IADB)
- Inter-Parliamentary Union (IPU)
- International Atomic Energy Agency (IAEA)
- International Bank for Reconstruction and Development (IBRD)
- International Chamber of Commerce (ICC)
- International Civil Aviation Organization (ICAO)
- International Criminal Court (ICCt)
- International Criminal Police Organization (Interpol)
- International Development Association (IDA)
- International Federation of Red Cross and Red Crescent Societies (IFRCS)
- International Finance Corporation (IFC)
- International Fund for Agricultural Development (IFAD)
- International Labour Organization (ILO)
- International Maritime Organization (IMO)
- International Mobile Satellite Organization (IMSO)
- International Monetary Fund (IMF)
- International Olympic Committee (IOC)
- International Organization for Migration (IOM)
- International Organization for Standardization (ISO)
- International Red Cross and Red Crescent Movement (ICRM)
- International Telecommunication Union (ITU)
- International Telecommunications Satellite Organization (ITSO)
- International Trade Union Confederation (ITUC)
- Latin American Economic System (LAES)
- Latin American Integration Association (LAIA) (observer)
- Multilateral Investment Guarantee Agency (MIGA)
- Nonaligned Movement (NAM) (observer)
- Organisation for the Prohibition of Chemical Weapons (OPCW)
- Organization of American States (OAS)
- Permanent Court of Arbitration (PCA)
- Rio Group (RG)
- Unión Latina
- United Nations (UN)
- United Nations Conference on Trade and Development (UNCTAD)
- United Nations Educational, Scientific, and Cultural Organization (UNESCO)
- United Nations High Commissioner for Refugees (UNHCR)
- United Nations Industrial Development Organization (UNIDO)
- Universal Postal Union (UPU)
- World Confederation of Labour (WCL)
- World Customs Organization (WCO)
- World Federation of Trade Unions (WFTU)
- World Health Organization (WHO)
- World Intellectual Property Organization (WIPO)
- World Meteorological Organization (WMO)
- World Tourism Organization (UNWTO)
- World Trade Organization (WTO)

=== Law and order in Costa Rica ===
- Constitution of Costa Rica
- Crime in Costa Rica
- Human rights in Costa Rica
  - LGBT rights in Costa Rica
  - Freedom of religion in Costa Rica
- Law enforcement in Costa Rica

=== Military of Costa Rica ===
Military of Costa Rica

- Command
  - Commander-in-chief
    - Ministry of Defence of Costa Rica
- Forces
  - Army of Costa Rica
  - Navy of Costa Rica
  - Air Force of Costa Rica
  - Special forces of Costa Rica
- Military history of Costa Rica
- Military ranks of Costa Rica

=== Local government in Costa Rica ===
Local government in Costa Rica

== History of Costa Rica ==
History of Costa Rica

- Timeline of the history of Costa Rica
- Current events of Costa Rica
- Military history of Costa Rica

== Culture of Costa Rica ==
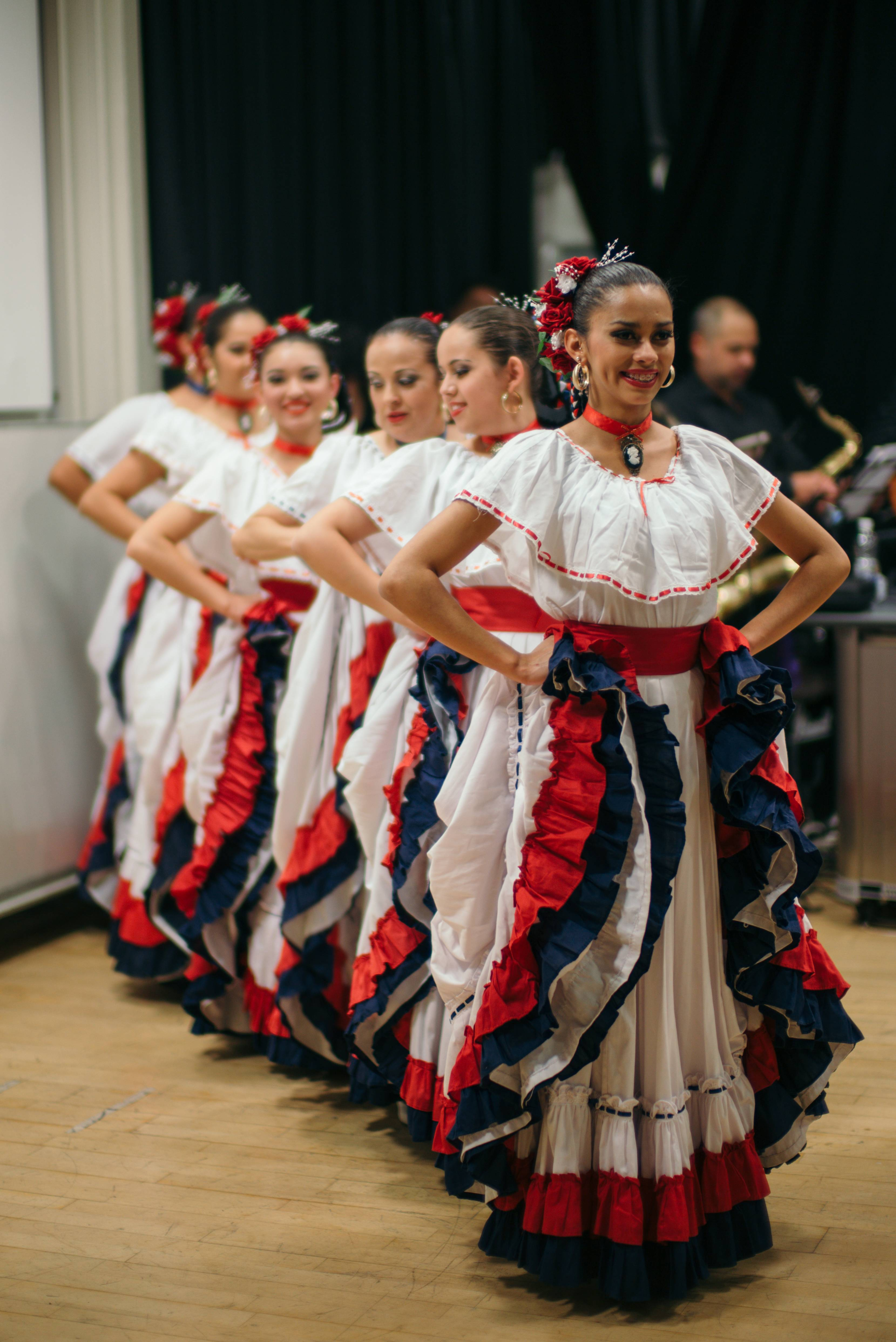
Costa Rican Women in traditional dress

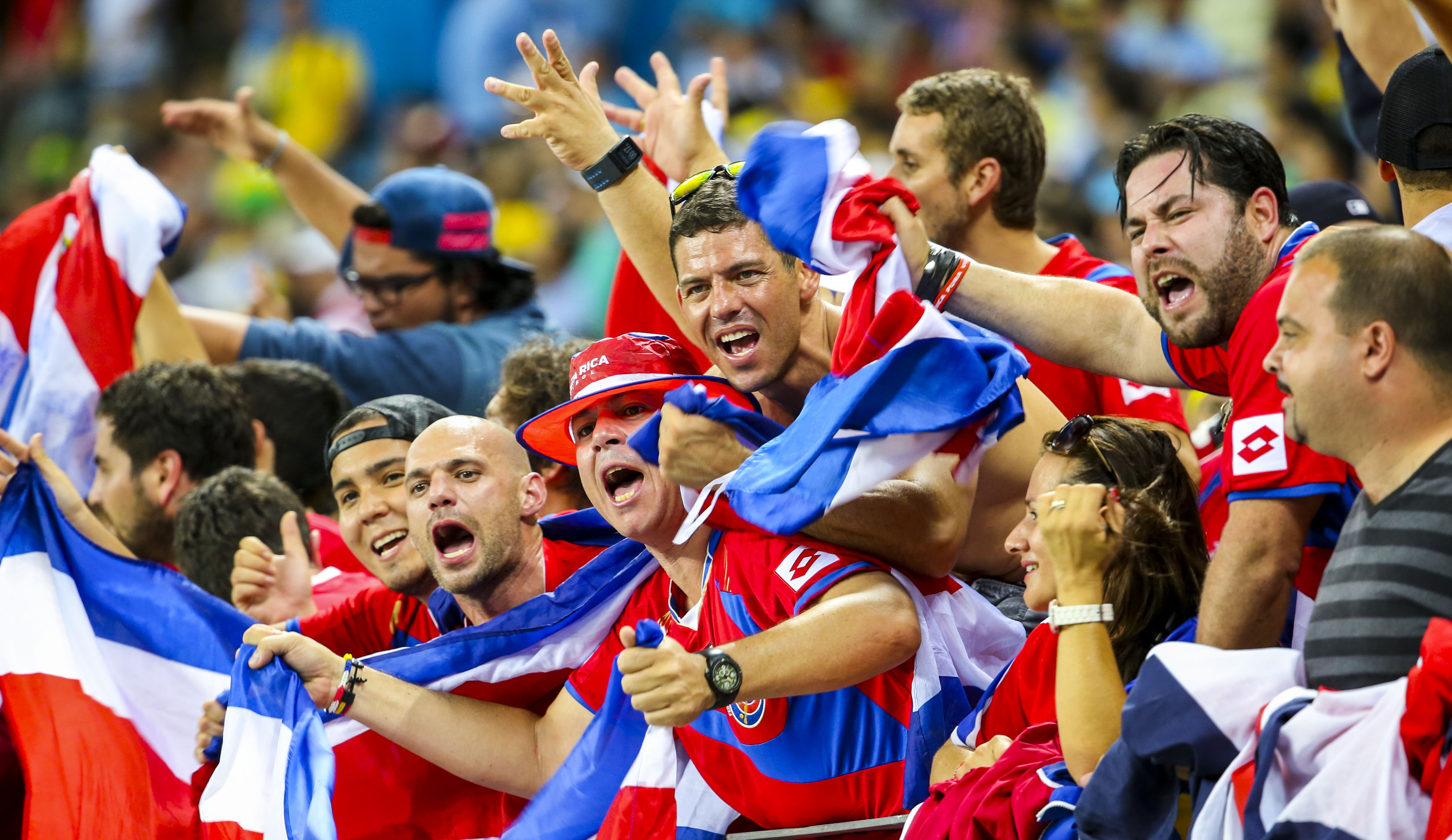
Costa Rica supporters at the 2014 FIFA World Cup

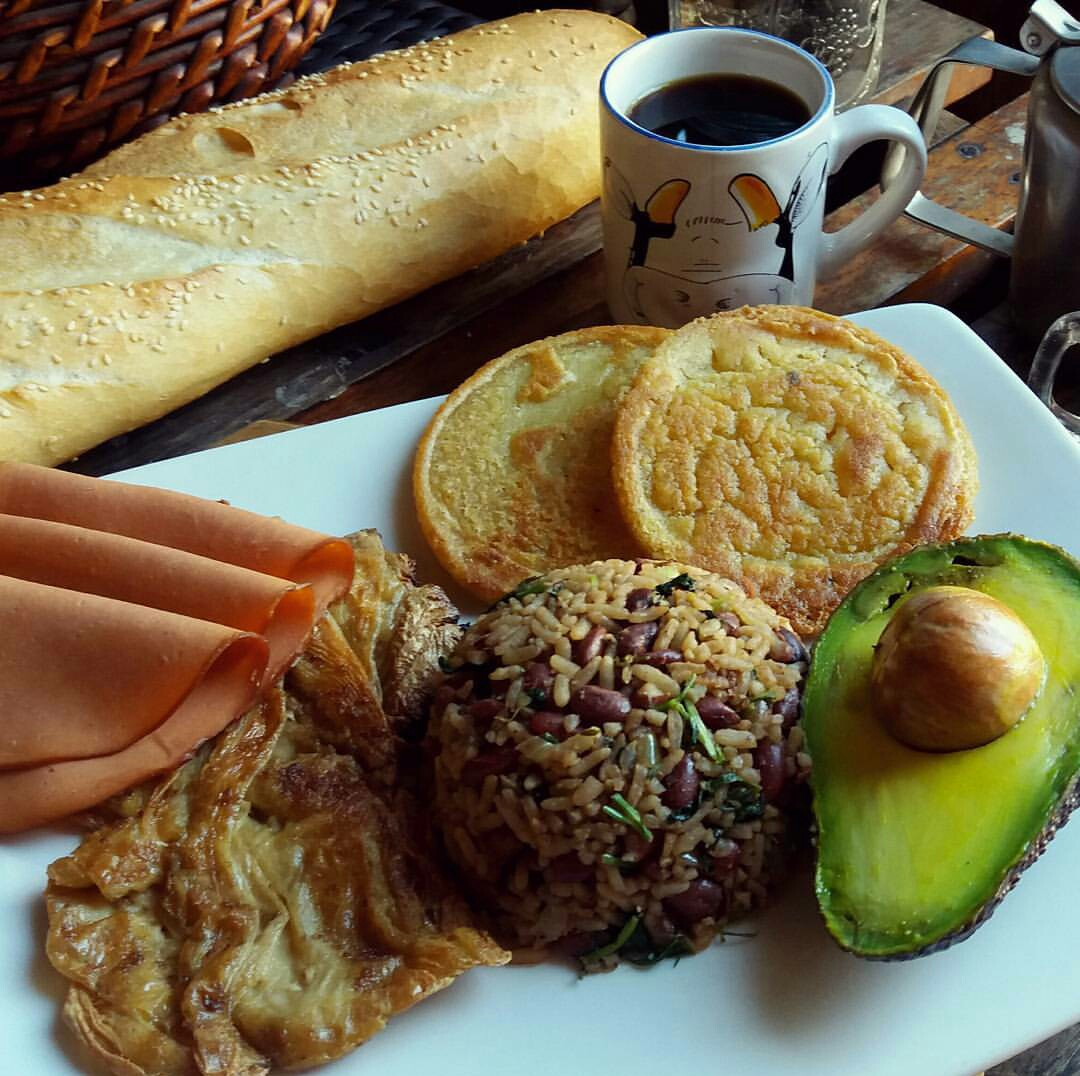
Costa Rican breakfast with gallo pinto

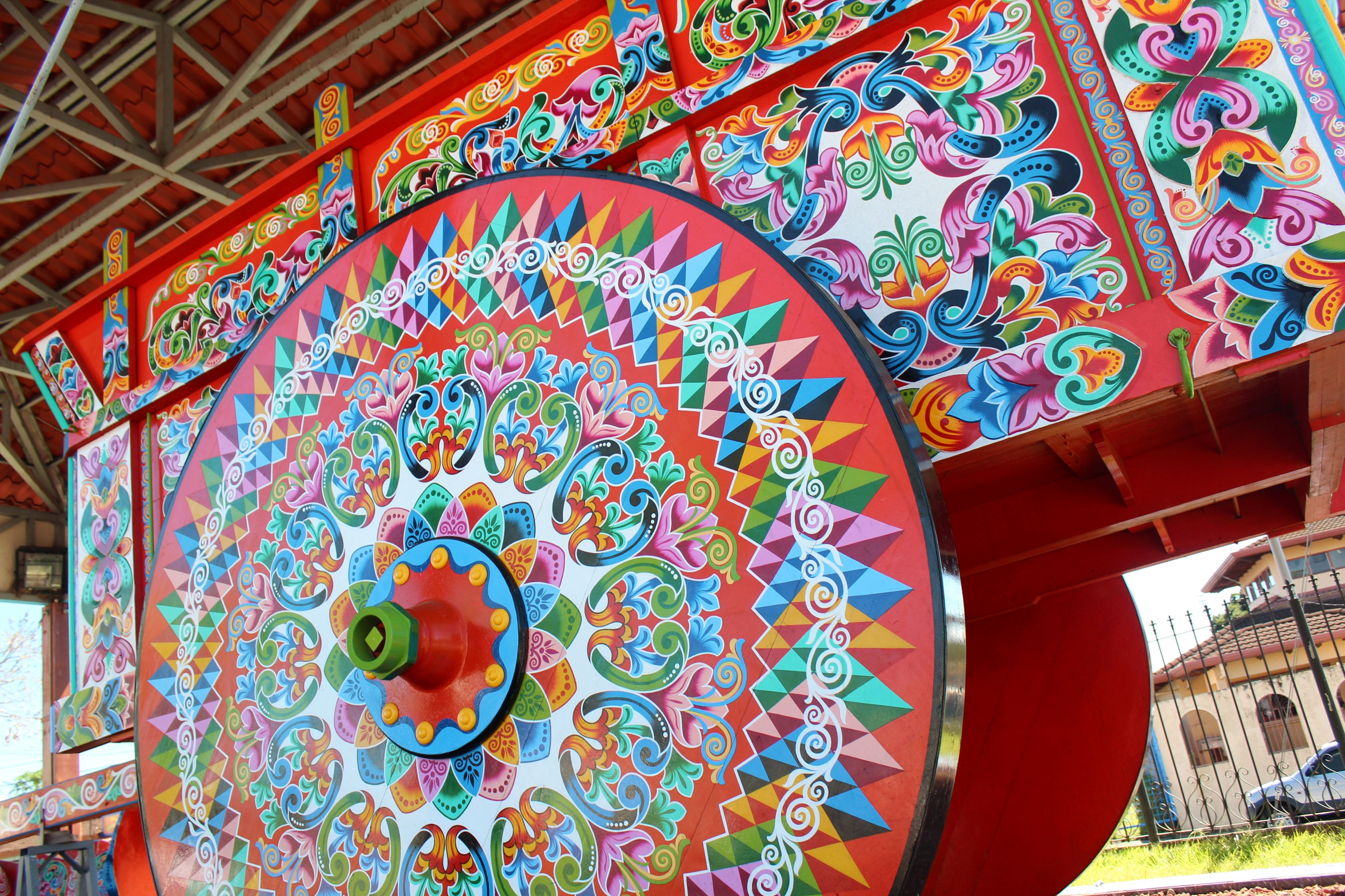
Las Carretas (oxcarts) are a national symbol.

- Architecture of Costa Rica
- Costa Rican people
- Cuisine of Costa Rica
- Festivals in Costa Rica
- Languages of Costa Rica
- Media in Costa Rica
- Museums in Costa Rica
- National symbols of Costa Rica
  - Coat of arms of Costa Rica
  - Flag of Costa Rica
  - National anthem of Costa Rica
- Prostitution in Costa Rica
- Public holidays in Costa Rica
- Religion in Costa Rica
  - Buddhism in Costa Rica
  - Christianity in Costa Rica
  - Hinduism in Costa Rica
  - Islam in Costa Rica
  - Judaism in Costa Rica
- World Heritage Sites in Costa Rica

=== Art in Costa Rica ===
- Cinema of Costa Rica
- Literature of Costa Rica
- Music of Costa Rica
- Television in Costa Rica

=== Sports in Costa Rica ===
Sports in Costa Rica

- Football in Costa Rica
- Costa Rica at the Olympics

== Economy and infrastructure of Costa Rica ==

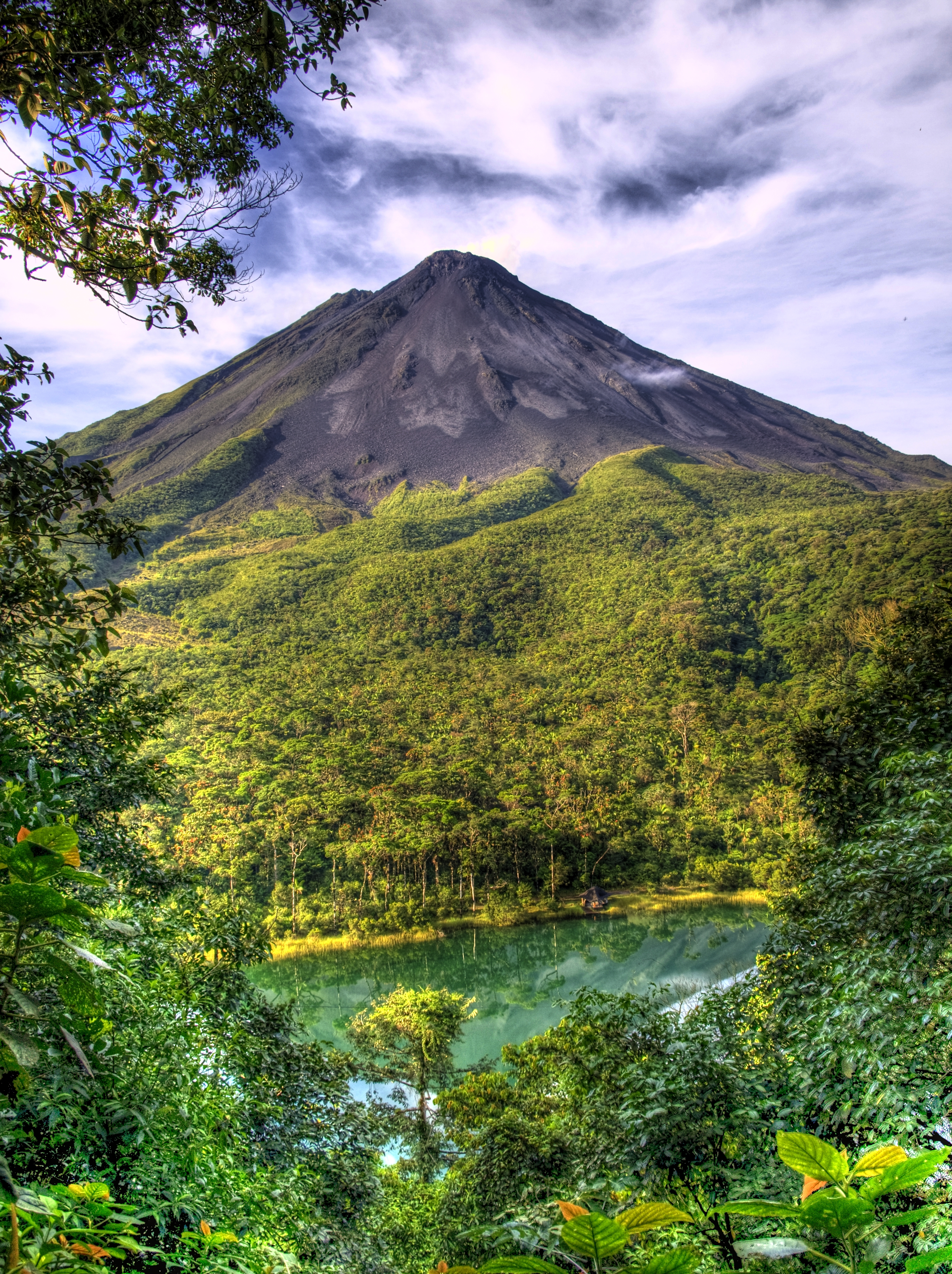
Arenal Volcano National Park

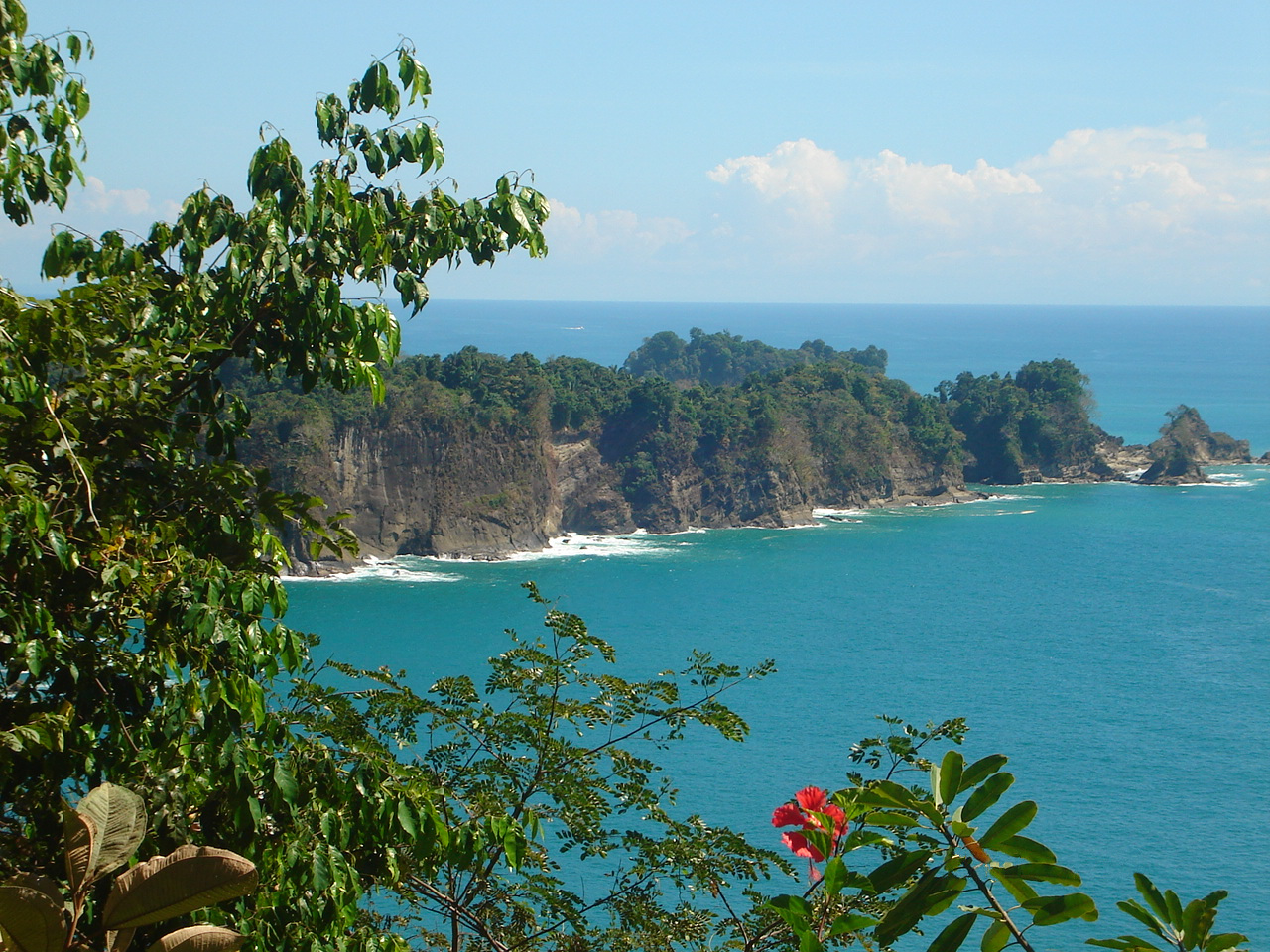
Manuel Antonio National Park

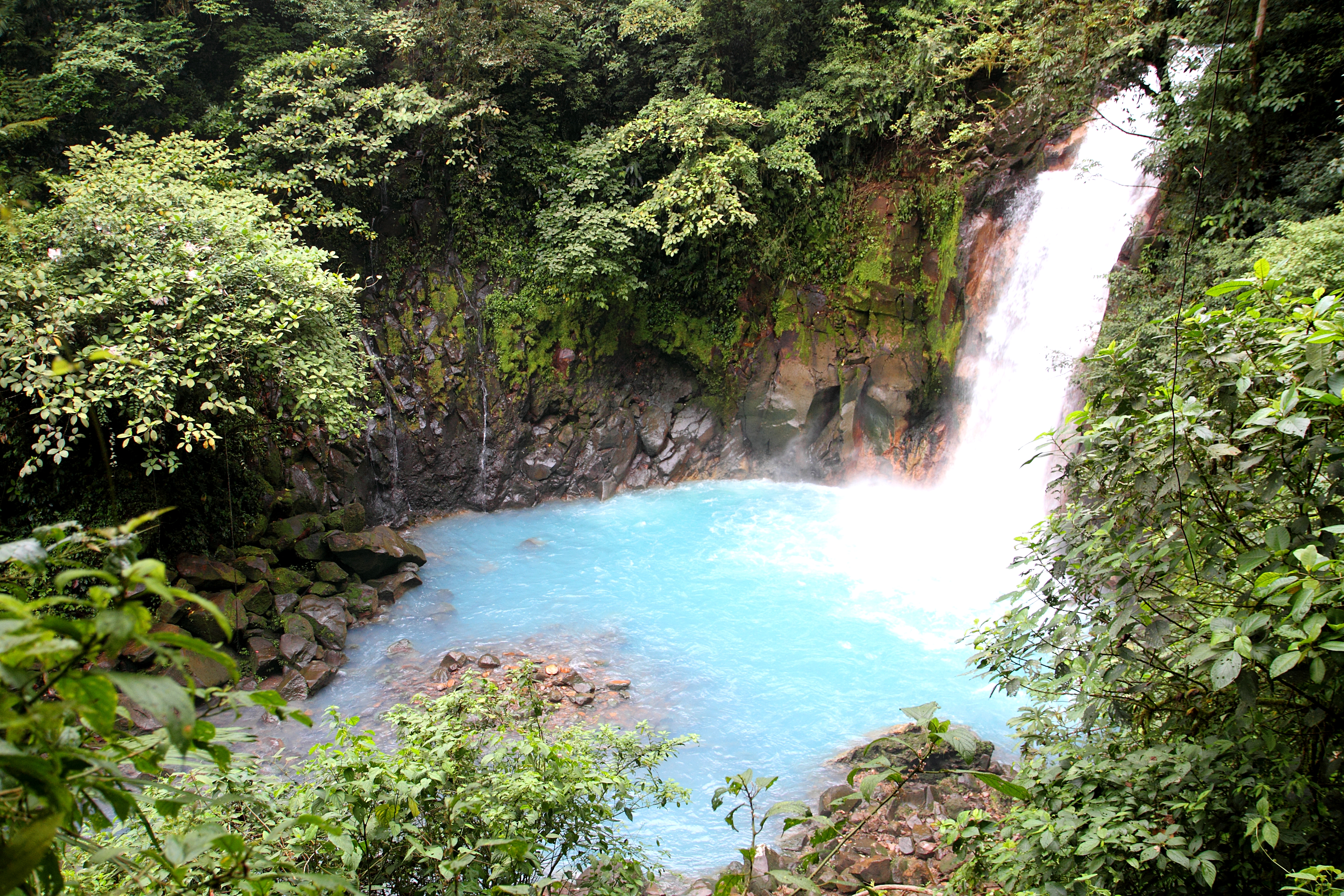
Río Celeste Waterfall

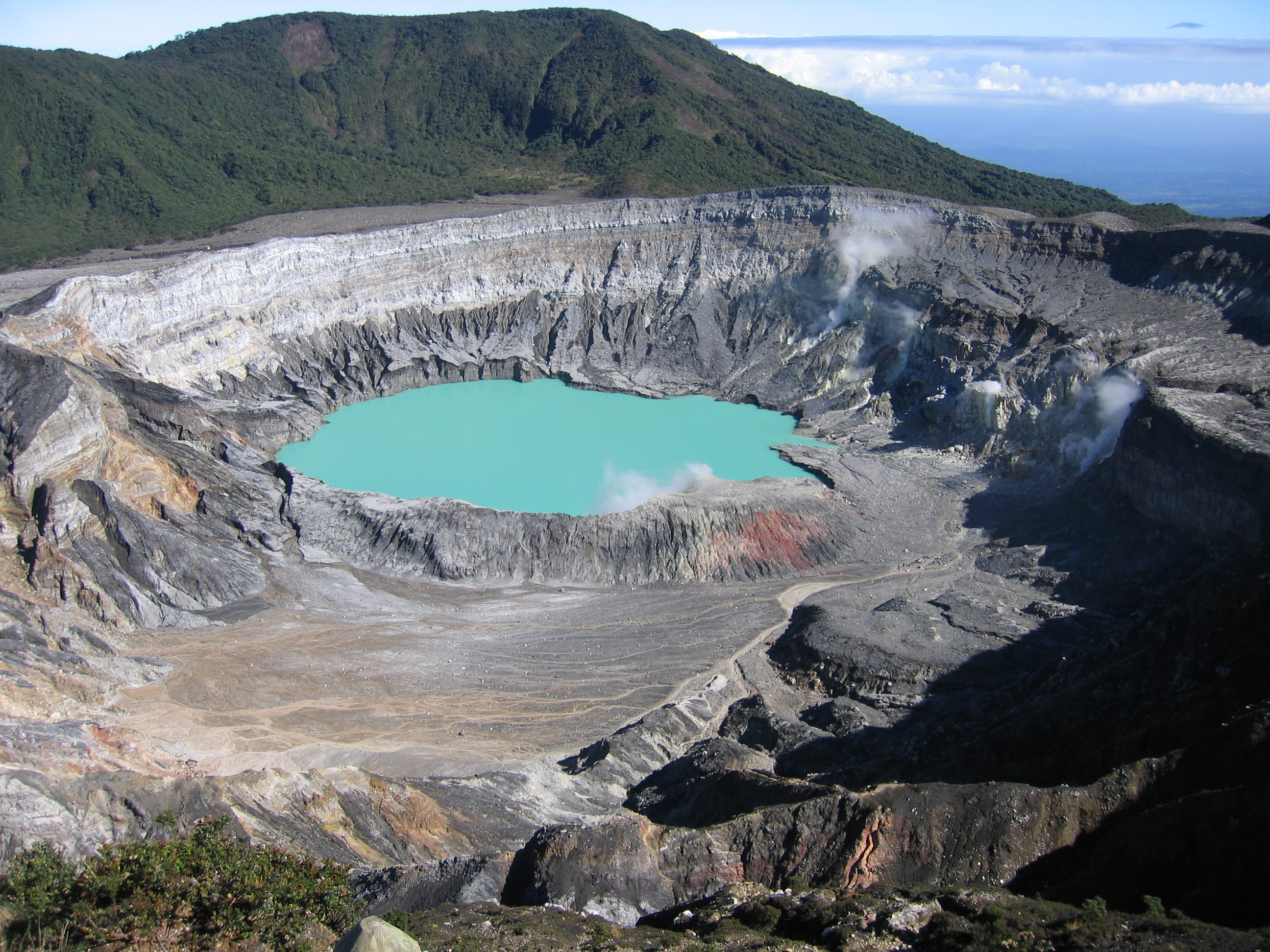
Poás Volcano National Park

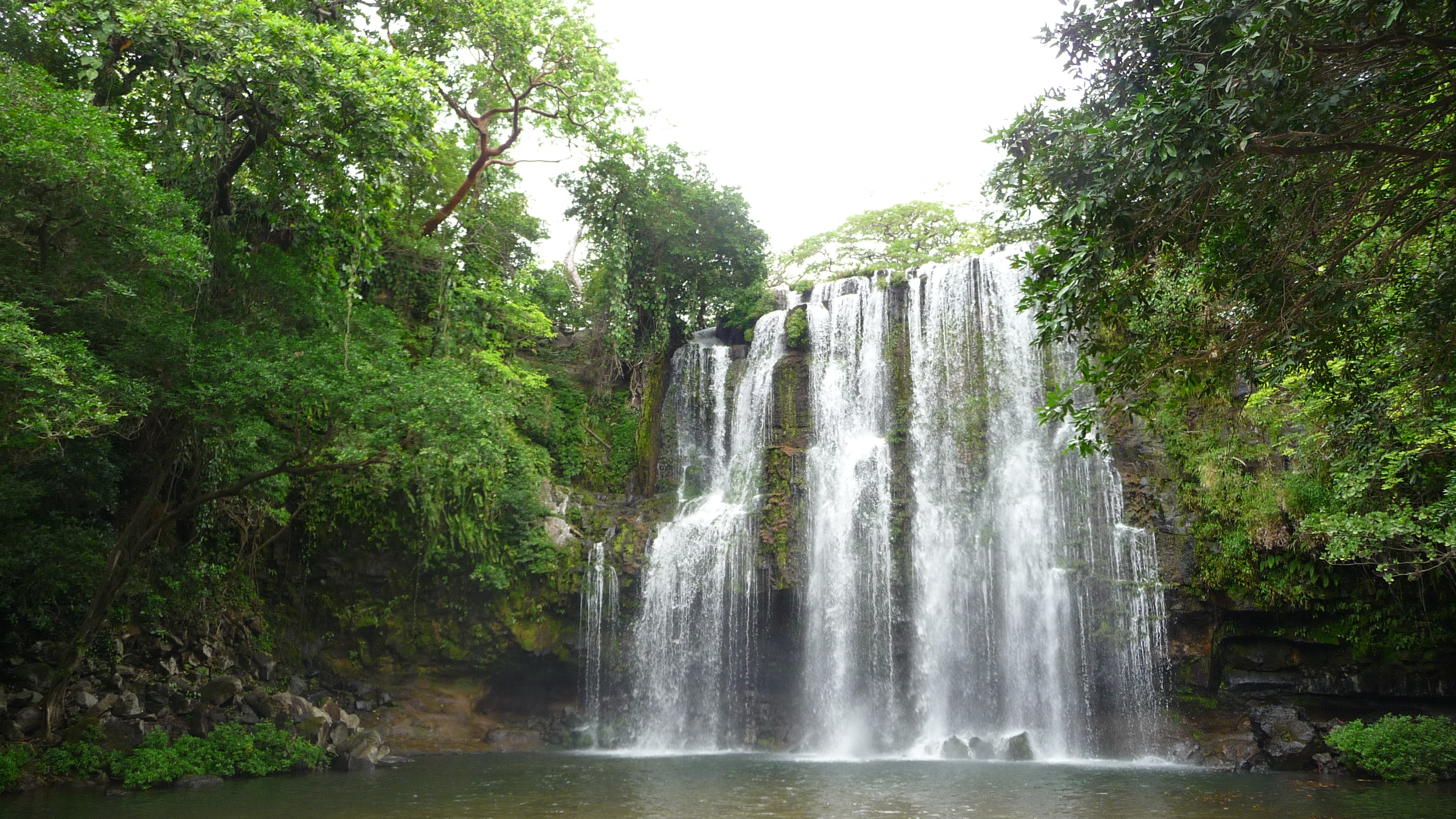
Llanos de Cortés Waterfall

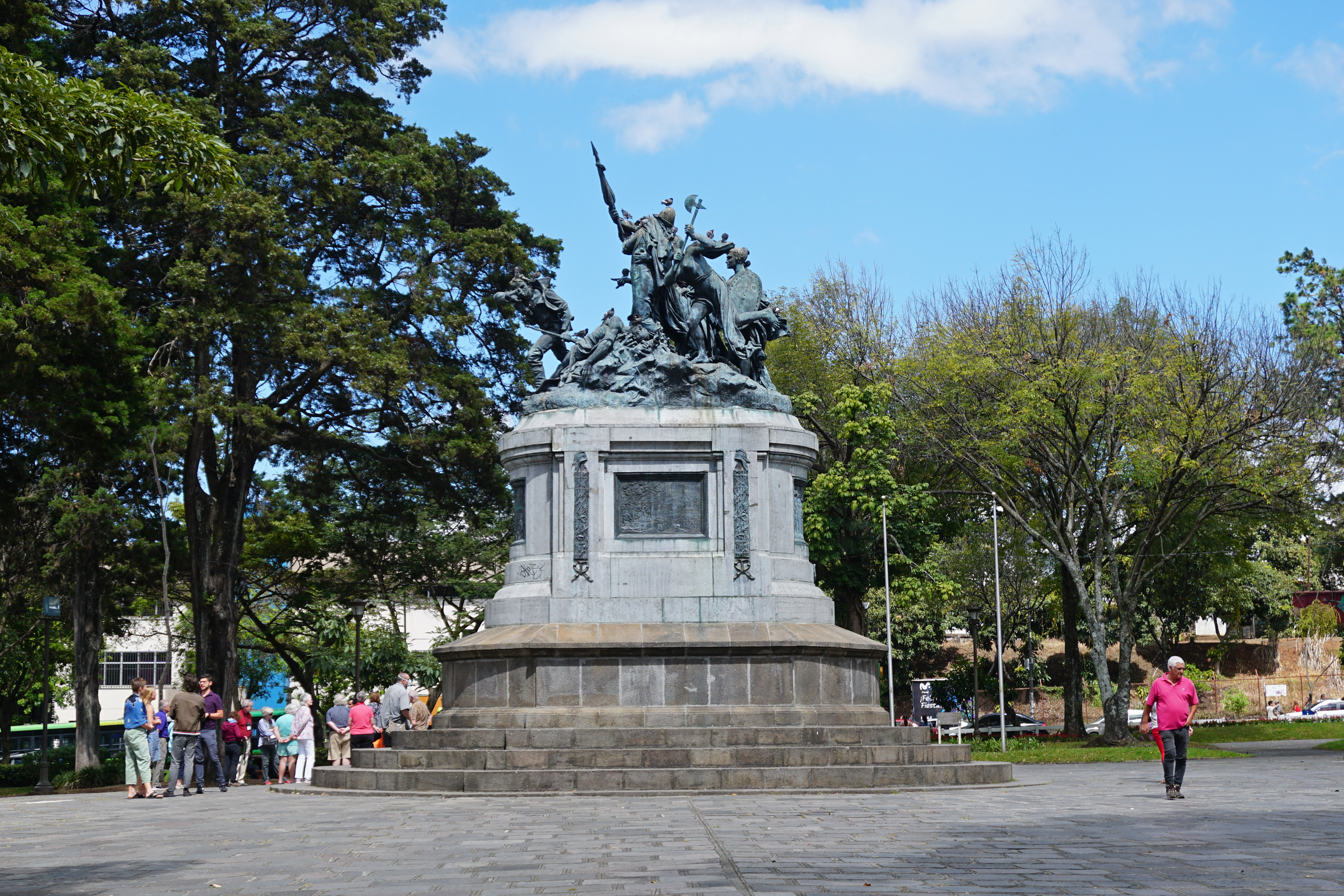
National Monument of Costa Rica

Economic rank, by nominal GDP (2007): 84th (eighty-fourth)

- Agriculture in Costa Rica
- Banking in Costa Rica
  - National Bank of Costa Rica
- Communications in Costa Rica
  - Internet in Costa Rica
- Companies of Costa Rica
- Currency of Costa Rica: Colón
  - ISO 4217: CRC
- Health care in Costa Rica
- Tourism in Costa Rica
- Transport in Costa Rica
  - Airports in Costa Rica
  - Rail transport in Costa Rica
- Water supply and sanitation in Costa Rica

== See also ==
Costa Rica

- List of Costa Rica-related topics
- List of international rankings
- Member state of the United Nations
- Outline of geography
- Outline of North America
