= National symbols of Costa Rica =

The national symbols of Costa Rica are the symbols used in Costa Rica to represent the country and its people. Costa Rica is the country with the most national symbols, having 22 as of 2026.

== National symbols ==
=== Flag ===
Costa Rica's flag

The Flag of Costa Rica has changed several times the independence of the country since 1821, the first version with red, white and blue was adopted in 1848, but the current version was introduced in 1906. It was inspired by the flag of France. The blue represents the country's skies of the country, the white means the purity, the peace and joy of the people, and the red represents the blood for those who fought for freedom.

=== Coat of arms ===
Costa Rica's coat of arms

The coat of arms of Costa Rica has changed slightly since its adoption in 1848. The most recent version was introduced in 1998. The three volcanoes represent the country's mountain ranges, the two oceans and merchant ships symbolize the Pacific Ocean and the Caribbean Sea, and the merchant ships symbolize the economy and the country's maritime history. The seven stars represent each one of the country's provinces, the rising sun means prosperity, the golden border of coffee beans, used previously as a coin, a blue ribbon bearing the inscription "Central America" and myrtle branches symbolizing peace, holding a ribbon with the inscription "Republic of Costa Rica".

=== Anthem ===
The country's national anthem was officially adopted in 1903, the music was composed in 1852 by Manuel María Gutiérrez and the lyrics by José María Zeledón Brenes. It shows the people as strong, that will defend its name and flag if they're under attack.

=== Independence torch ===
The Independence torch is the torch that runs through Guatemala, El Salvador, Honduras, Nicaragua and ends its path in Costa Rica, every year on 15 September. It symbolizes the union of Central American countries, the national pride and the expression of freedom.

=== Bell of Freedom ===
Located in Cartago, it is a bell in the Santiago Apóstol Parish Ruins, that rang when the country declared its independence. It also sounded to alert the people during the Ochomogo War in 1823, and to announce the return of Our Lady of Los Angeles after it got stolen in 1824. It has been an important part of the country's most significant moments.

=== Flower ===
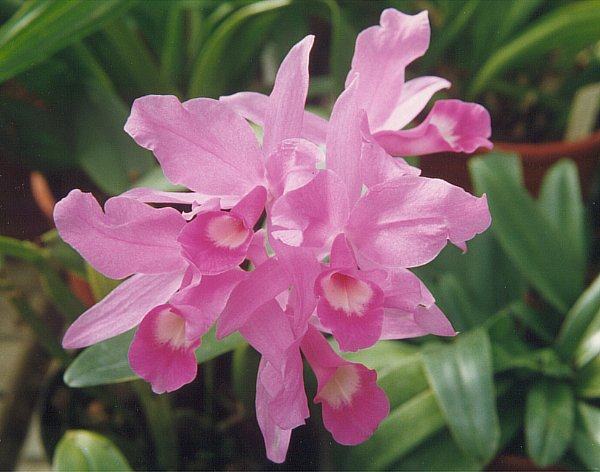
The national flower of Costa Rica

The national flower is known in Costa Rica as guaria morada. This flower blooms from January to April and grows in trees and branches without parasitizing them, being an epiphytic plant.

=== Tree ===
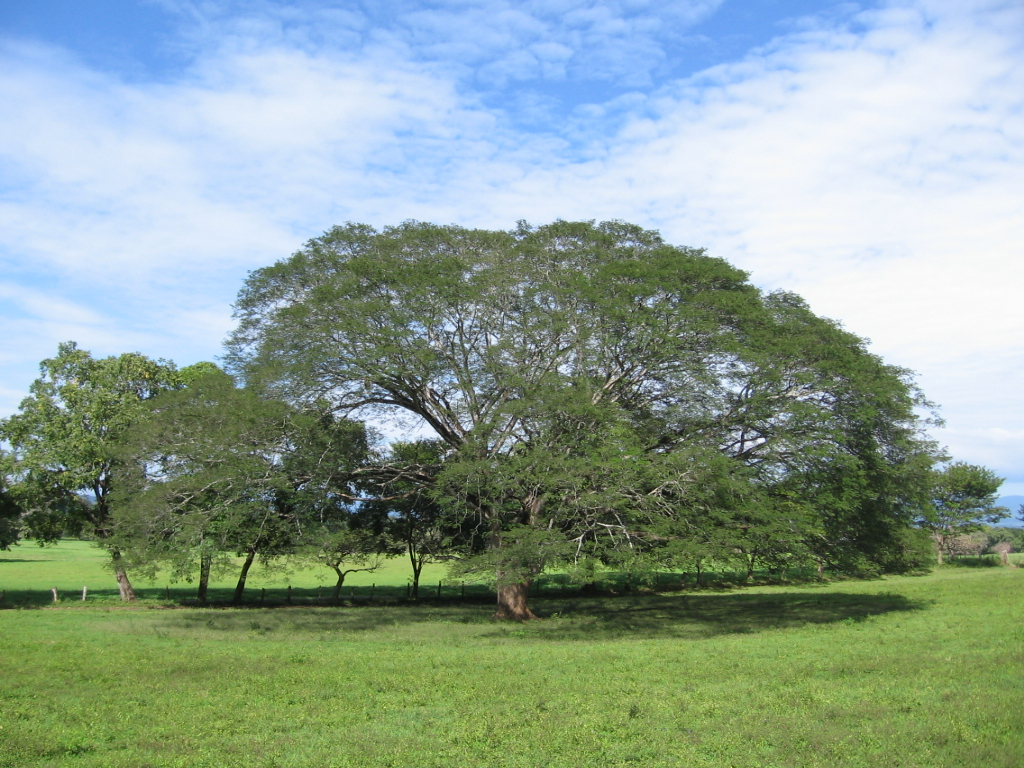
The national tree of Costa Rica

Costa Rica's national tree is known as the Guanacaste tree by the locals, due to its abundance in the Guanacaste Province. It represents the annexation of Guanacaste in 1824, and the shade it provides from the sun means protection for the people.

=== Bird ===
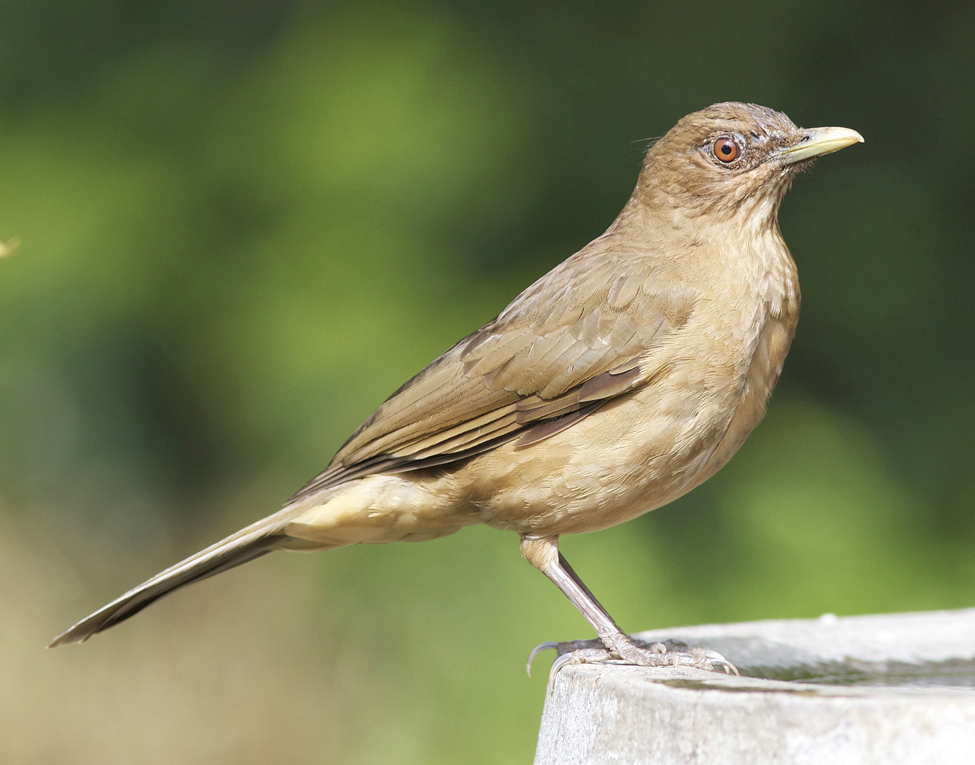
The yigüirro, the national bird

The national bird of Costa Rica is the yigüirro. It has a completely brown plumage, with red eyes and a long beak, its chest is slightly lighter than the rest of its body. Although it does not have a colorful plumage, it represents humility and its call usually announces the beginning of the rainy season.

=== White-tailed deer ===
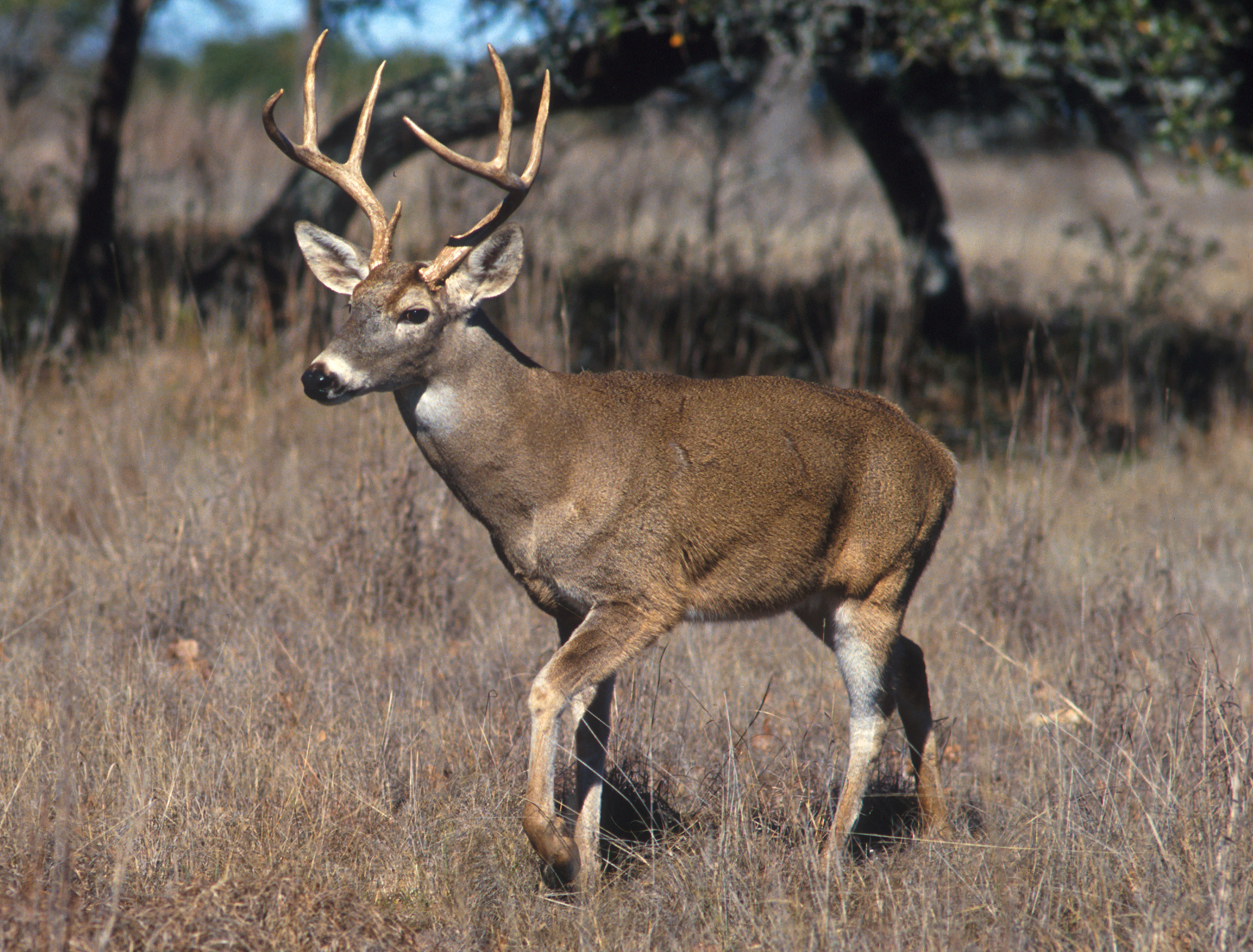
A male white-tailed deer.

The white-tailed deer is one of the national mammals of Costa Rica. It habitates the dry forests, being especially common in the Guanacaste Province. It symbolizes the fight against illegal hunting and the country's compromise to protect wildlife. It appears on the 1000 colones banknote .

=== Manatee ===
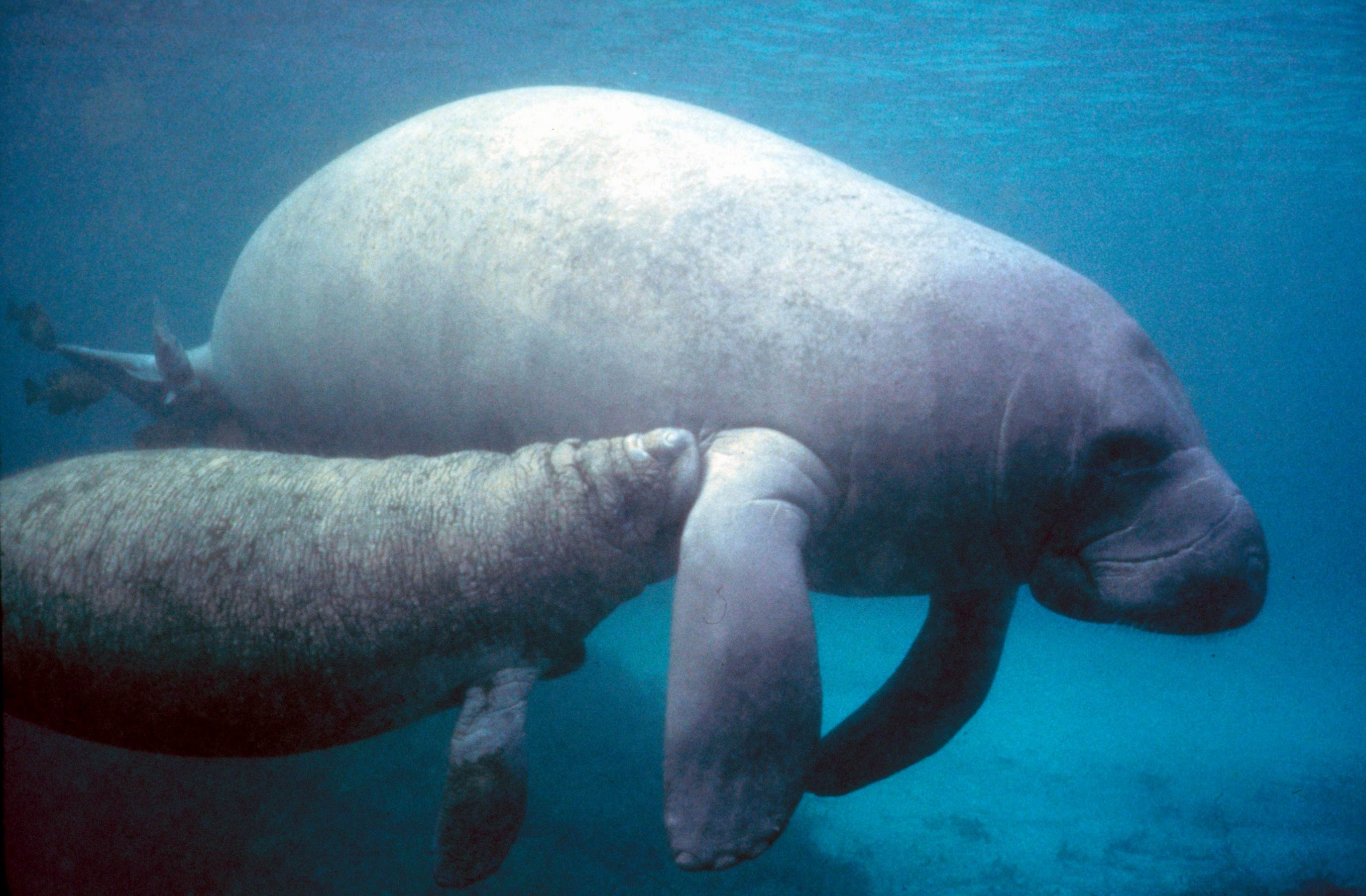
A manatee and its calf

The West Indian manatee is a sea cow that lives in shallow waters of the Caribbean Sea. Officially designated as a symbol in 2014, it protects an endangered species and encourages children to appreciate and protect marine wildlife.

=== Sloth ===
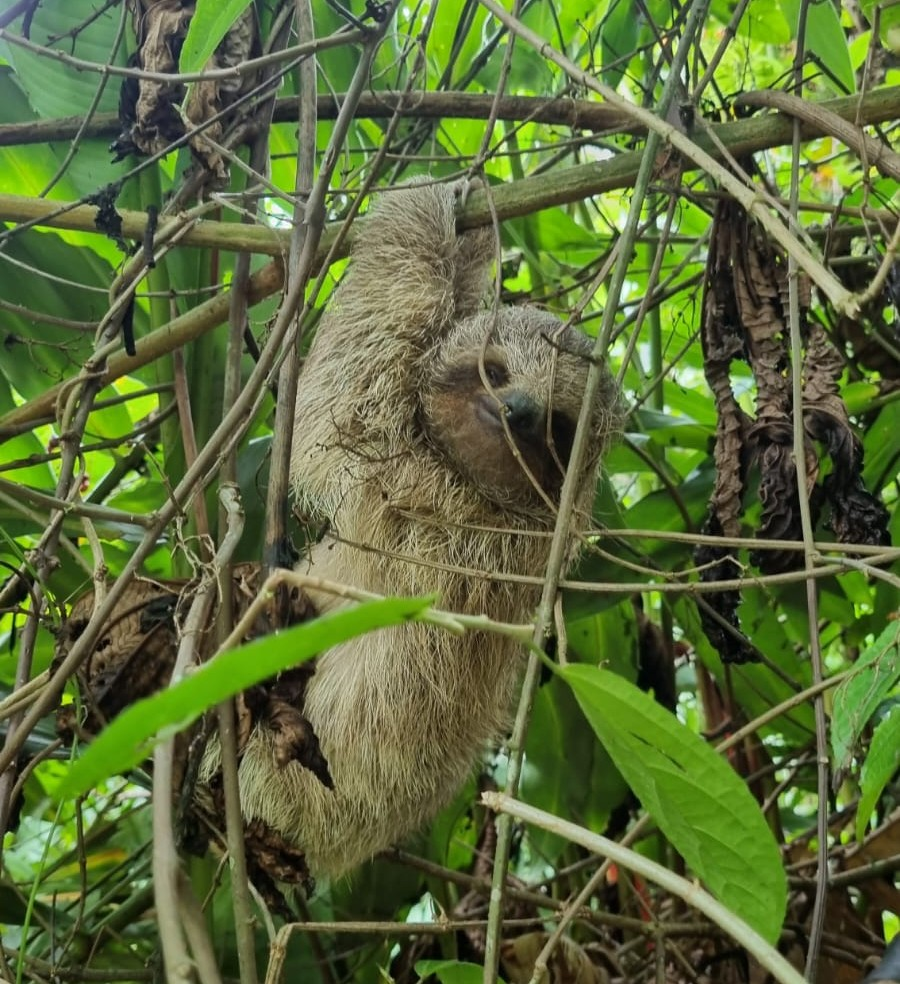
A juvenile three-toed sloth

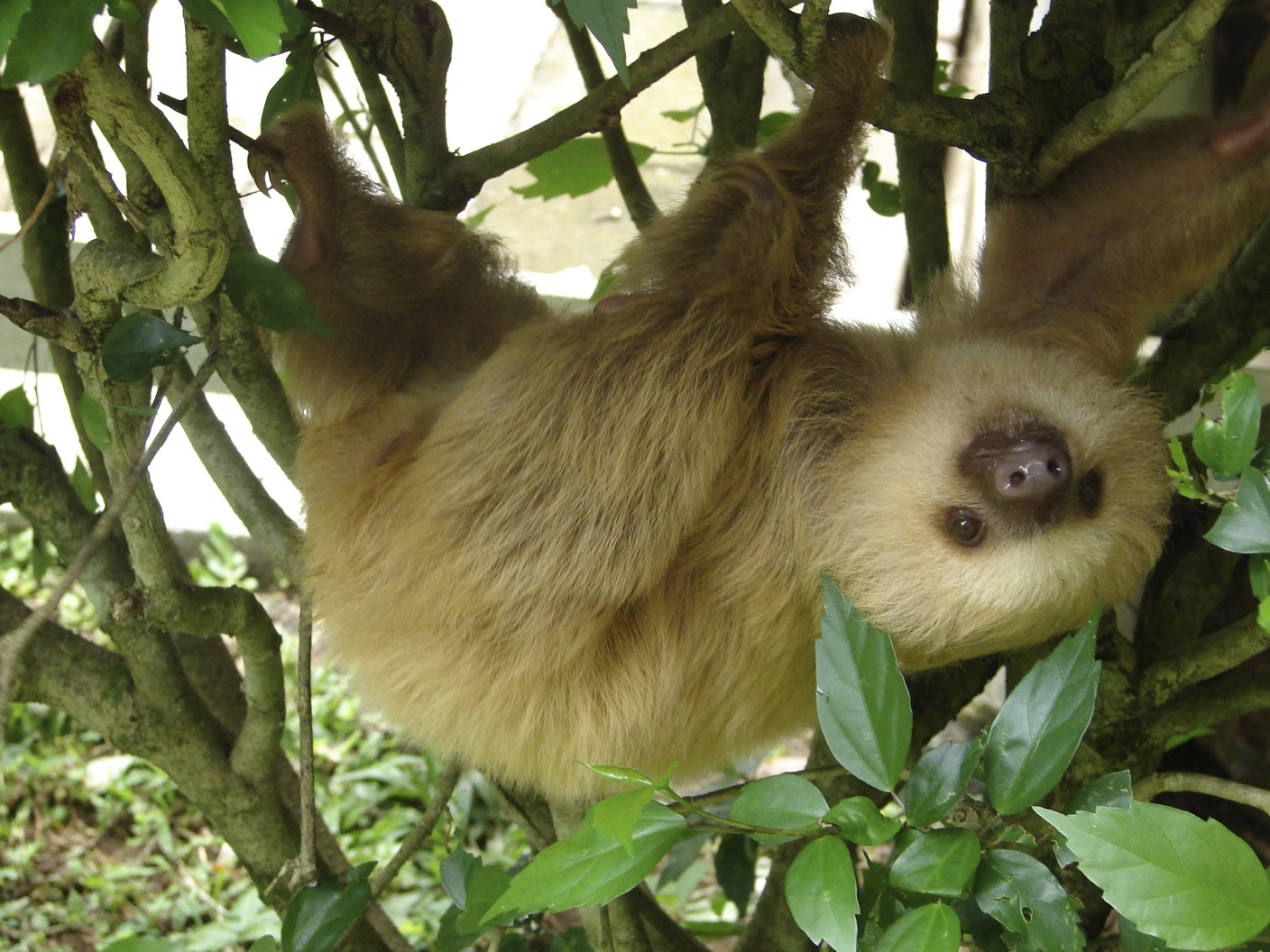
A two-toed sloth

The three-toed and two-toed sloths are the only species of sloths that inhabit Costa Rica. Both are national symbols, designated to help conserve these species and protect their habitat.

=== Morpho butterfly ===
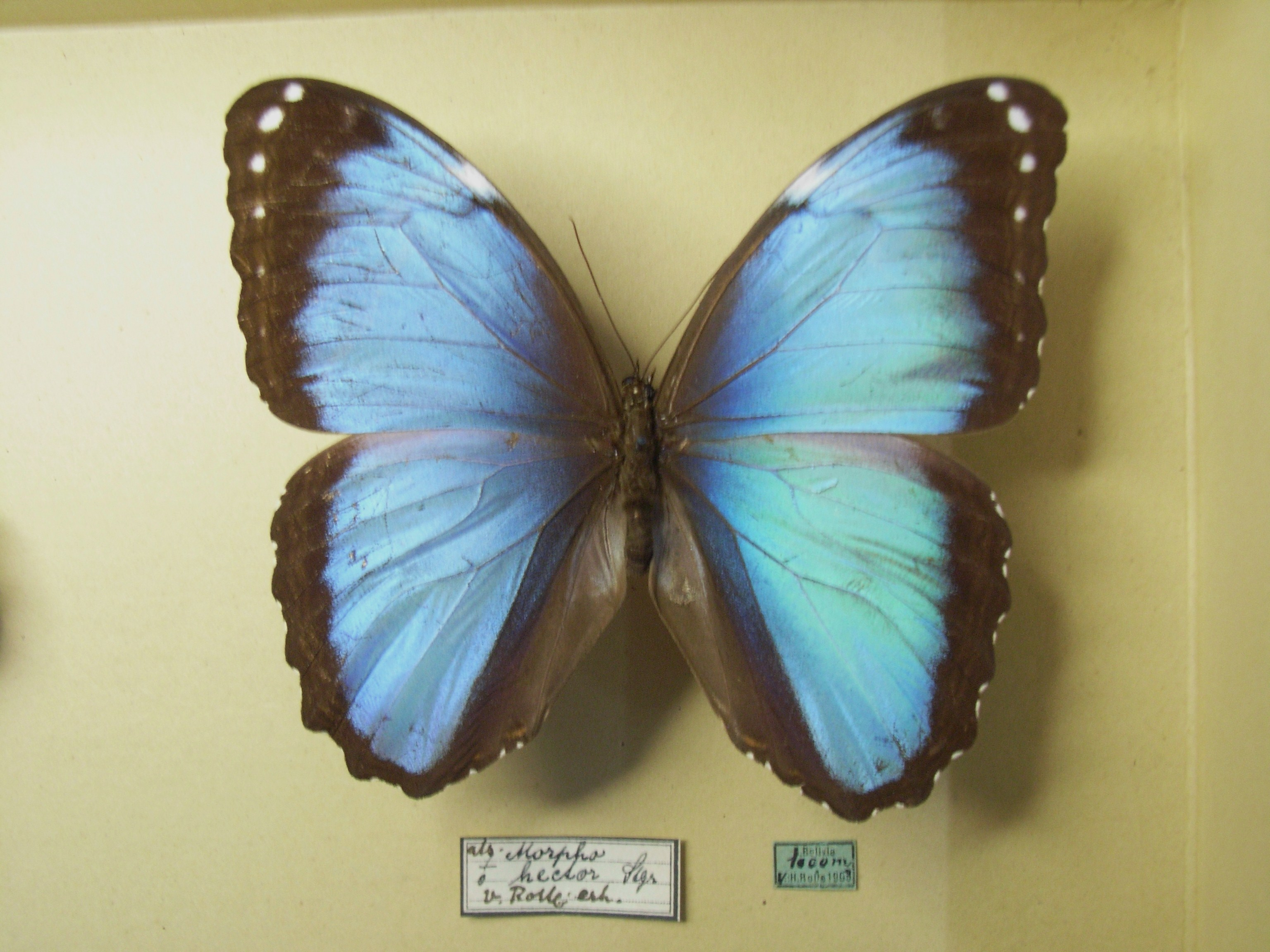
A morpho butterfly, not the same species as the protected one, the protected is Morpho helenor narcissus.

The morpho helenor narcissus is the national butterfly of Costa Rica. Designated as a symbol in 2022, it represents protection for the species, stable tourism and freedom.

=== Hummingbird ===
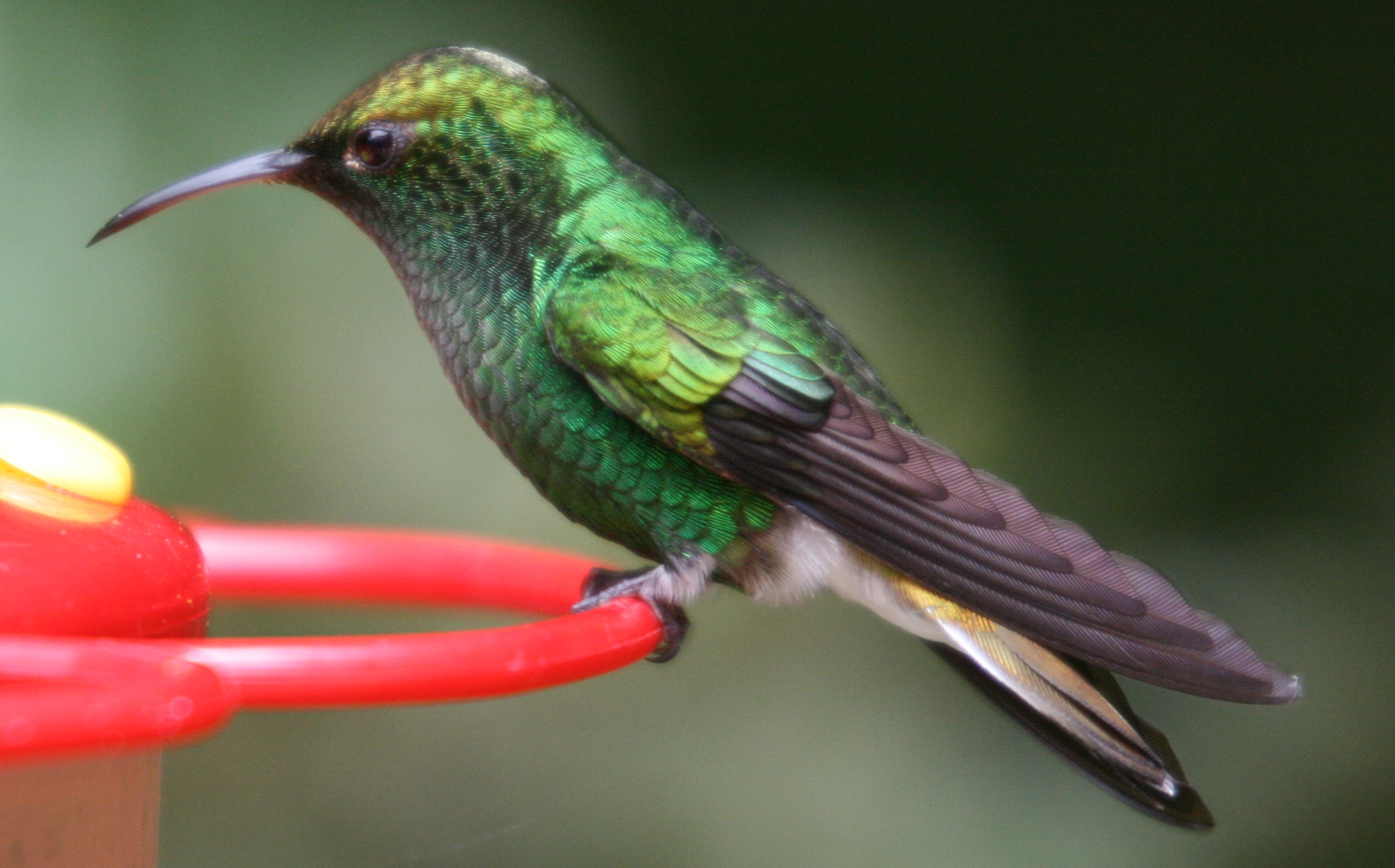
Coppery -headed emerald, one of the national hummingbirds of the country.

The Coppery-headed emerald and the mangrove hummingbird are the two species of hummingbirds that are national symbols. Both of them are endemic to Costa Rica. The mangrove hummingbird is an endangered species, oficialized symbols to protect the species and to use the hummingbird as the image of Costa Rica in tourism.

=== Stone spheres ===
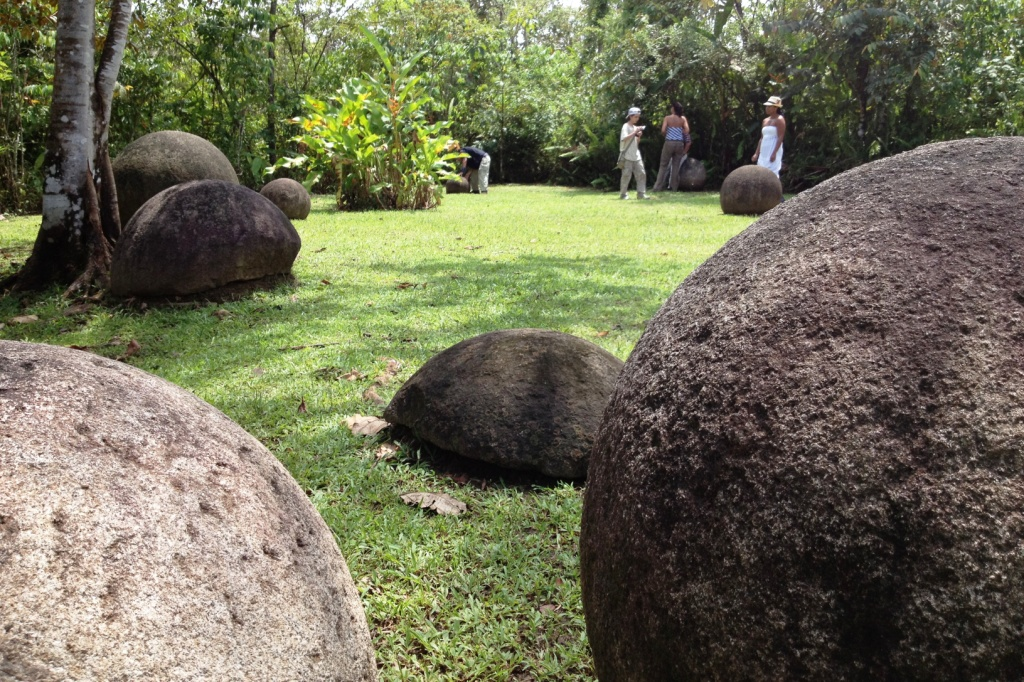
The stone spheres, located at the Finca 6 archeological site.

The stone spheres are a group of petrospheres, located mainly at the Finca 6 archeological site. They were made by the Diquis indigenous people from as early as 300 B.C. until the Spanish colonization. Although the exact purpose of their creation and how they were shaped into such nearly aperfect spheres with limited technology remain unknown, they are a major tourist attraction and represent the country's indigenous culture and history.

=== Coffee ===
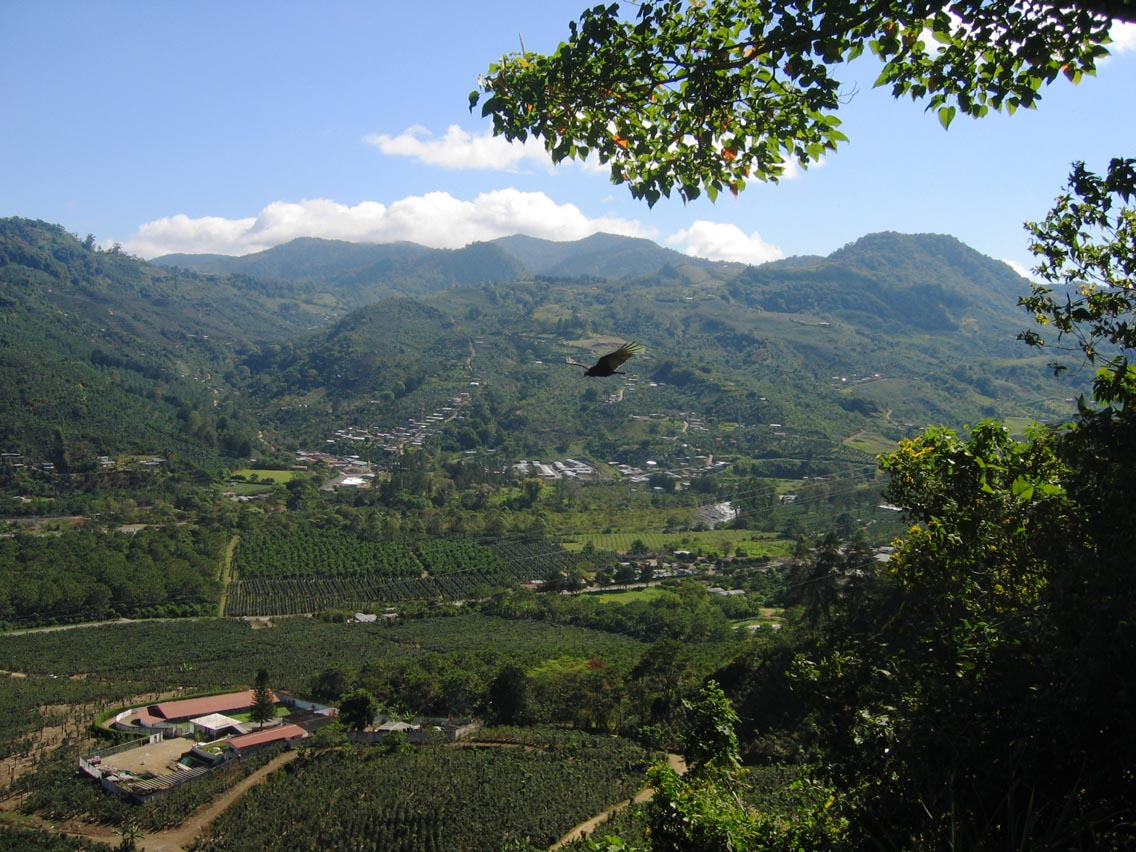
A coffee plantation in Costa Rica

Coffee has been an important part of Costa Rica's economy since the 19th and 20th centuries. Known as the "golden grain", its large-scale exports contributed significantly to the country's economical growth. Although coffee remains an important parts of the country's economy, but it is not the main source of income.

=== Traditional oxcart ===
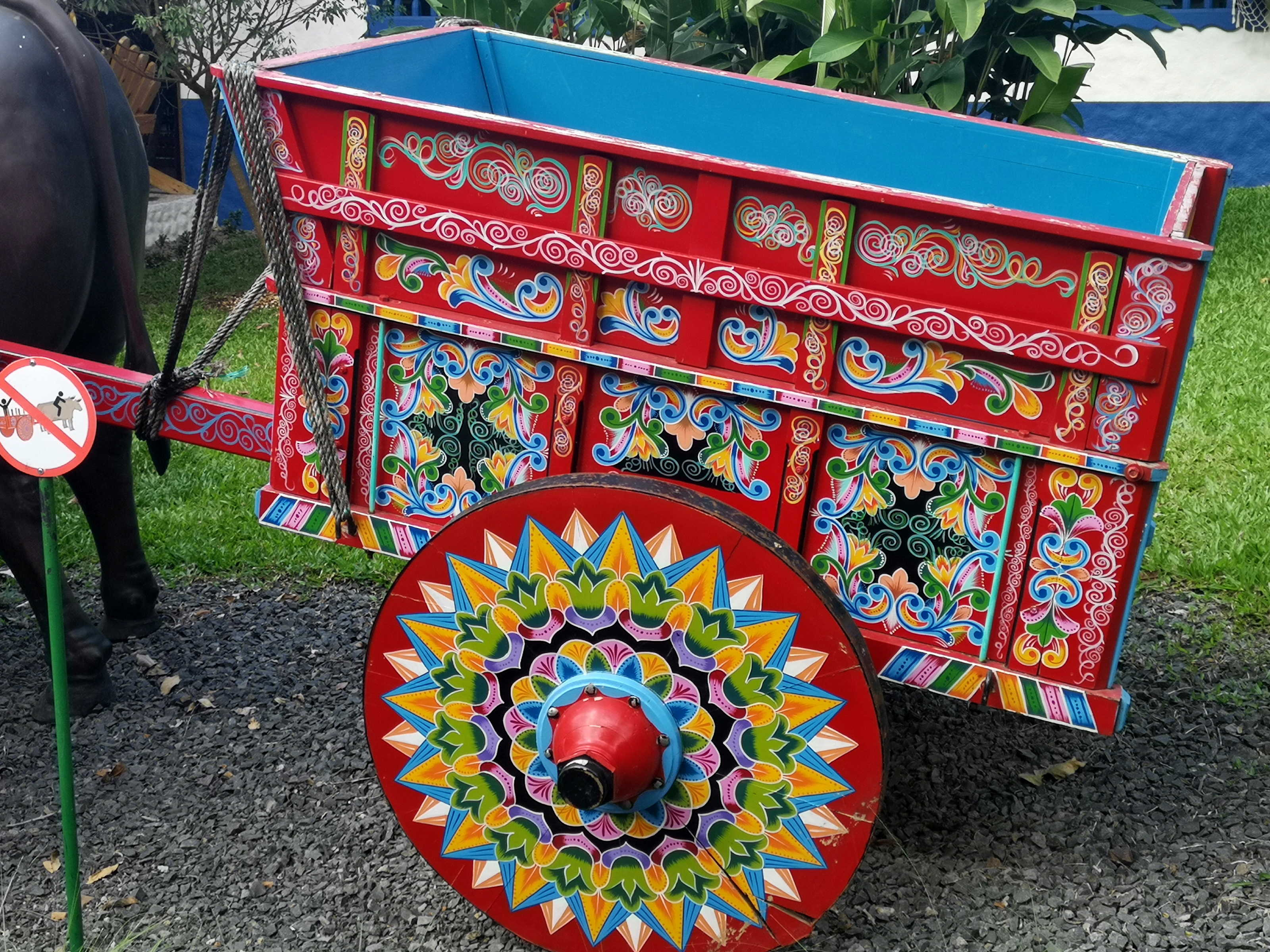
The traditional oxcart, symbol of work

The traditional oxcart is Costa national Rica's national bullock cart, a vehicle usually pulled by cattle such as oxen. It represents hard work and also was an important part of commerce in Costa Rica. Oxcarts were used to transport coffee, sugar, pineapples and lots of other products.

=== "Los Crestones" ===
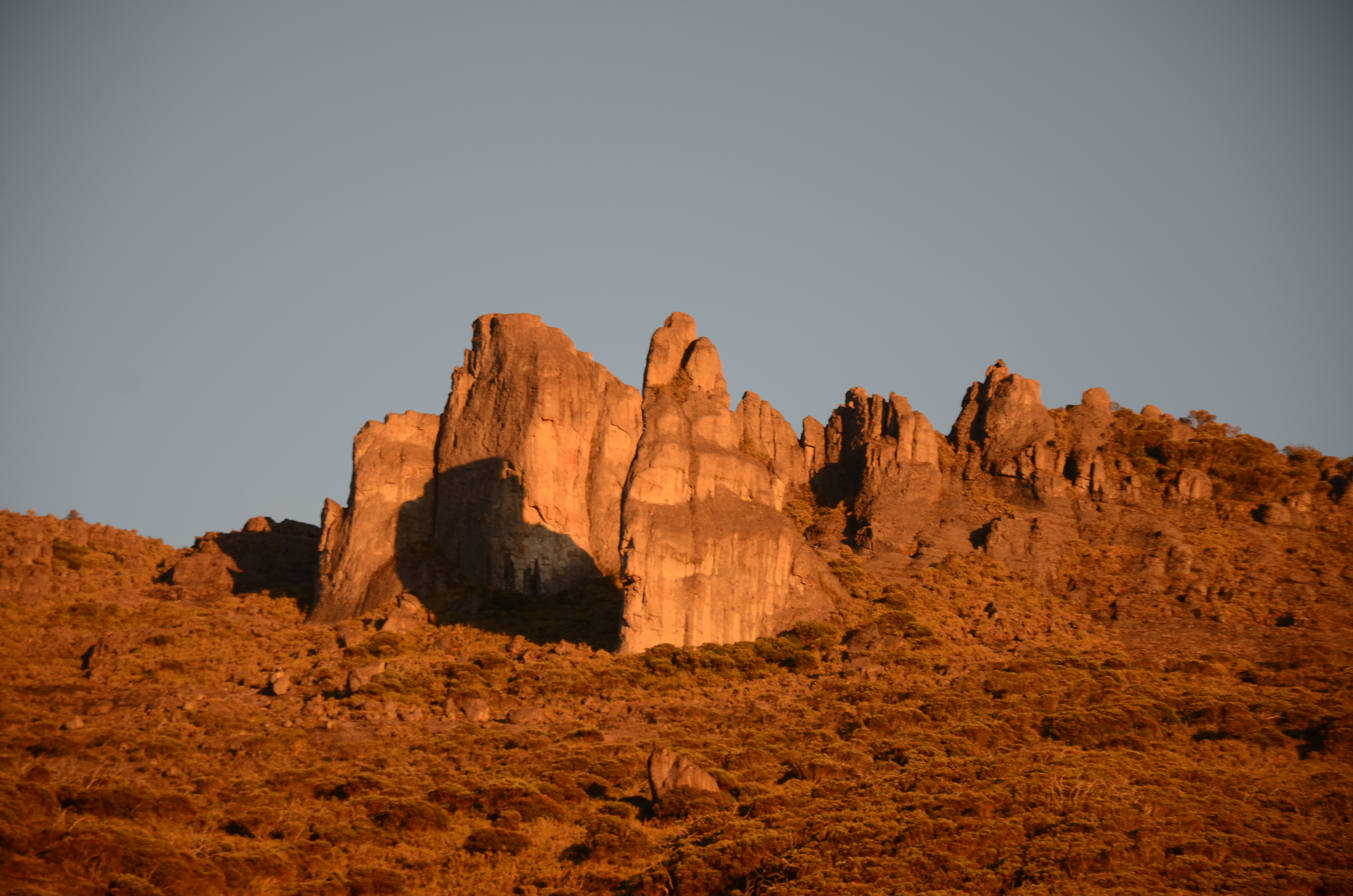
Los Crestones in the Cerro Chirripó

Los Crestones, meaning "The Rocky Peaks", are a series of geological formations in Chirripó National Park. They reach heights of up to 60 meters (196.85 feet) and are located at an elevation of approximately 3,700 meters (12,139 feet) above sea level. They were officially designated as national symbols in 2011 to promote their image in tourism.

=== Musical instrument ===
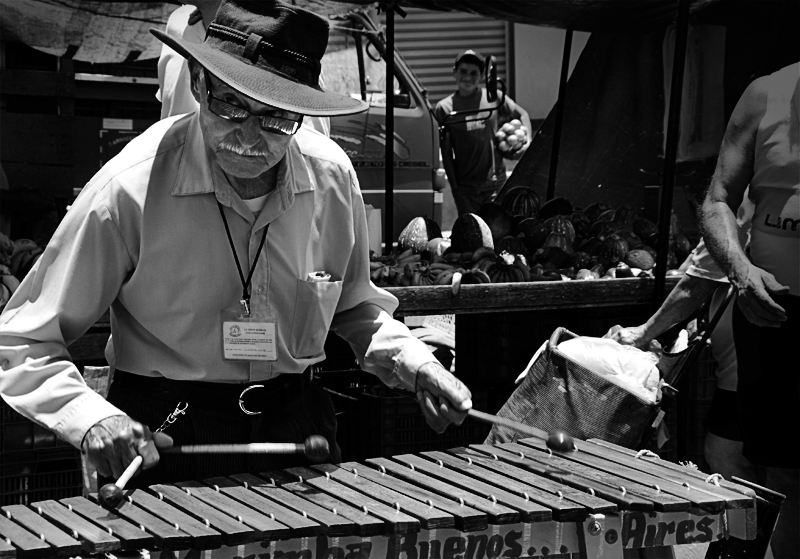
A "marimbero" playing thecmarimba in the street.

The marimba is a musical instrument from the percussion family. It consists of wooden bars that are hit with mallets. It arrived at the country during the Spanish colonization, mixing African and Mesoamerican cultures. These are usually fabricated and are more popular in the Guanacaste Province.

=== National Theatre ===
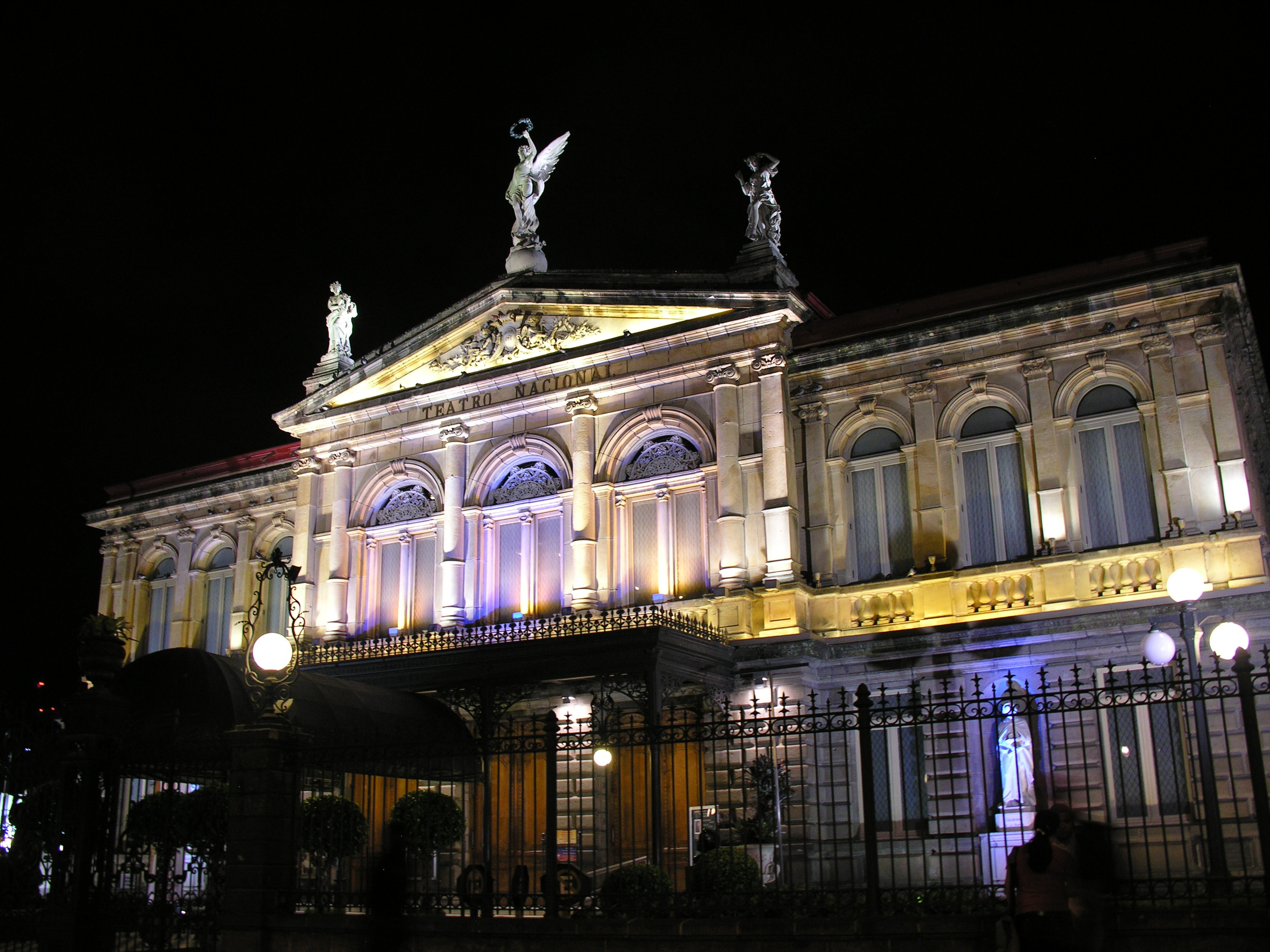
The national theatre at night

The National Theatre of Costa Rica (Spanish: Teatro Nacional de Costa Rica) opened to the public in 1897 in San José. Considered one of the country's most significant architectural landmarks, it serves as a symbol of national identity, progress, and artistic expression. Its construction was funded primarily through taxes on coffee exports during the late 19th century. Many of the building's construction materials and decorative elements were imported from Belgium, Italy, and England.

=== Traditional houses made of adobe and bahareque ===
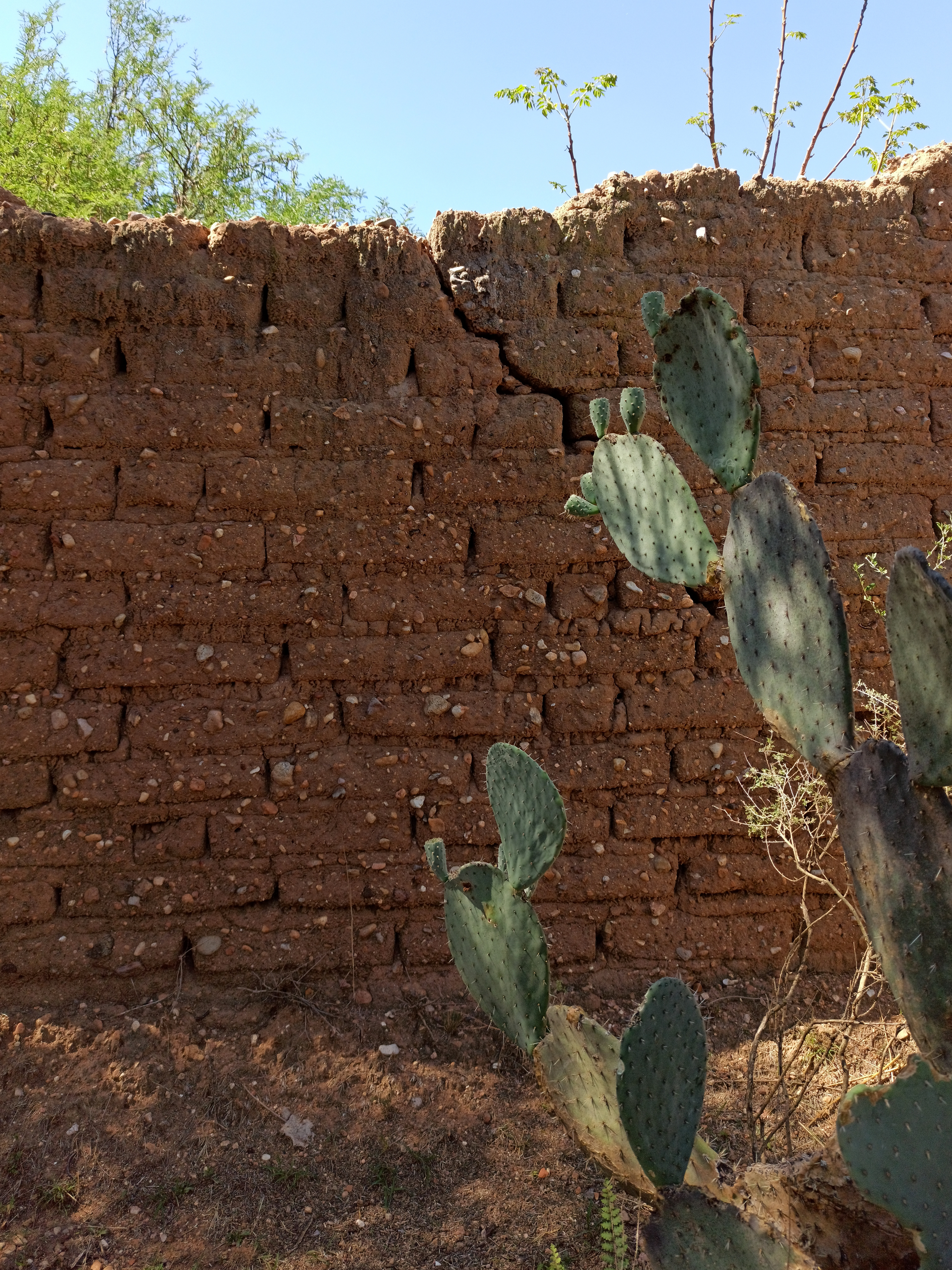
A wall built with adobe.

The houses built with adobe and bahareque are examples of traditional construction techniques using mud, water and hay or grass. Then, is shaped until it has a brick shape and then the bricks are left to dry in the sun during weeks. Once dried, are ready to be used for construction. Bahareque consists of a framework of thick wooden posts buried in the ground to provide structural stability, with bamboo tied between them. These traditional construction techniques represent humility, architectural heritage, and the value of peace.

=== "Mascaradas" ===
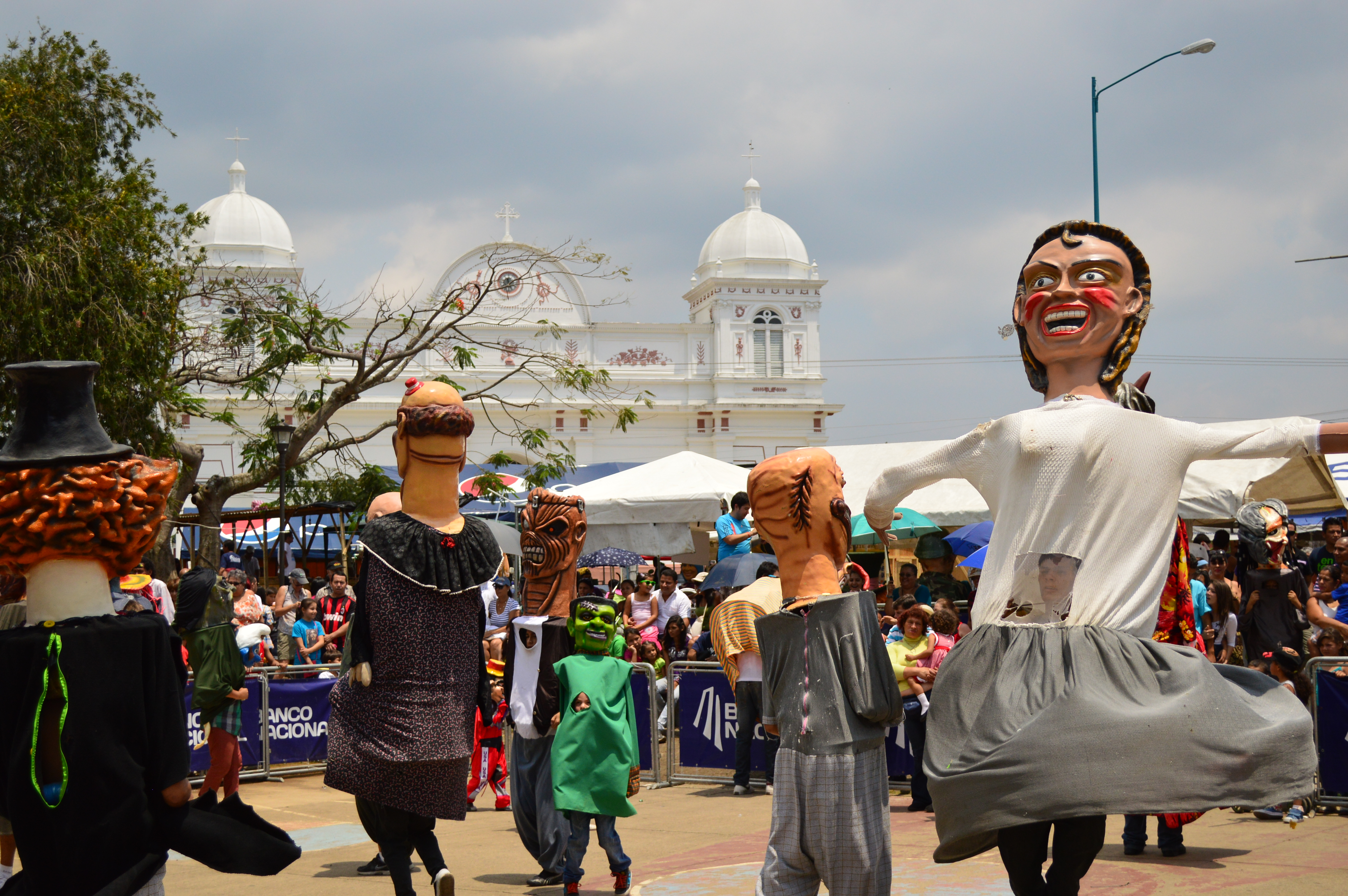
"Mascaradas" dancing with people in celebrations

Mascaradas, literally "masquerades" are traditional Costa Rican celebrations featuring masks representing different people, personalities or legends. Famous masquerades figures include La Giganta "The Giant", the legend of the "Segua/Cadejos", and the devil. These are made with mud or clay and usually are accompanied by traditional lively music, allowing the people controlling the masquerade figures can dance.

=== "Duelo de la Patria" ===
The piece, literally meaning "Mourning of the Homeland," was composed in 1882 by Rafael Chávez Torres after the death of Tomás Guardia Gutiérrez, a former president of Costa Rica. It evokes feelings of respect and mourning and is performed every Holy Friday in churches throughout Costa Rica, as well as in Guatemala and Spain.
