= Television in Costa Rica =

Television arrived in Costa Rica in 1960 with Teletica.

== History ==
The first experiments were conducted in October 1954, by technician Álvaro Zamora Dobles and businessmen Manuel Mendiola and Álvaro Zúñiga. The success of this experiment led to the creation of Televisora Tica Limitada (Televitica), which initially carried only advertising slides for stores. The government rejected Televitica's projects and planned to have a television monopoly in 1955, though when Mario Echardi took over the government, the private license was approved on VHF channel 8. In February 1956, a heart surgery was broadcast over a closed-circuit network, while on July 25 that same year, the festival at Santa Cruz de Guanacaste followed. Mario Echardi's presidential campaign in 1957 was also broadcast in this system. No statistics are known to exist.

In October 1958, a new agreement led to the creation of a new company, Televisora de Costa Rica, Teletica. Regular broadcasts followed on May 9, 1960. New channels started with Tic-Tac Canal 9 on April 12, 1962, Telecentro Canal 6 on September 12, 1965, Canal 2 Telenac on August 28, 1966 and Televictoria Canal 11 in 1969.

Televictoria was the first in Costa Rica to offer color broadcasts, which became regular in 1971 and full-time in 1974. Public television started in 1978, with financing from the Spain.

The 90s were marked by the creation of Representaciones Televisivas (Repretel) which was owned by Remigio Ángel González, who, in 2008, would create a new umbrella brand for his networks, Albavisión. He acquired channel 9, 6 and 11 in 1995. In 1997, Repretel 11 ended its relays of Repretel 6, gaining its own schedule. Mexican conglomerate TV Azteca acquired Canal 4 Multinoticias in 1998 with the aim of building a Latin American network of channels, but sold it to Repretel in early 2000 due to financial difficulties.

Digital terrestrial television uses the ISDB-T standard in its Brazilian form. The last analog signals were switched off on January 31, 2023.
