= Telecommunications in Costa Rica =

Telecommunications in Costa Rica include radio, television, fixed and mobile telephones, and the Internet.

== Radio and television ==
- Radio stations: more than 100 privately owned radio stations and a public radio network (2007).
- Radios: 980,000 (1997).
- Television stations: multiple privately owned TV stations and 1 publicly owned TV station; cable network services are widely available (2007).
- Television sets: 525,000 (1997).

== Telephones ==
- Communications service provider: Grupo ICE, government monopoly.
- Calling code: +506
- International call prefix: 00
- Main lines: 1.0 million lines in use, 75th in the world (2012).
- Mobile cellular: 6.2 million lines, 100th in the world (2012).
- Telephone system: good domestic telephone service in terms of breadth of coverage; under the terms of CAFTA-DR, the state-run telecommunications monopoly was scheduled to be opened to competition from domestic and international firms, but has been slow to open to competition, point-to-point and point-to-multi-point microwave, fiber-optic, and coaxial cable link rural areas; connected to Central American Microwave System, a trunk microwave radio relay system that links the countries of Central America and Mexico with each other. (2011).
- Satellite earth stations: 2 Intelsat (Atlantic Ocean) (2011).
- Communications cables: landing points for the Americas Region Caribbean Ring System (ARCOS-1), MAYA-1, and the Pan-American Crossing submarine cables that provide links to South and Central America, parts of the Caribbean, and the US (2011).

== Internet ==
- Top-level domain: .cr, the Academia Nacional de Ciencias is the registrar.
- Internet users: 194,269 users, 154th in the world; 34.7% of the population, 123rd in the world (2012).
- Fixed broadband: 32,192 subscriptions, 120th in the world; 5.7% of population, 98th in the world (2012).
- Wireless broadband: Unknown (2012).
- Internet hosts: 147,258 hosts, 78th in the world (2012).
- IPv4: 44,032 addresses allocated, less than 0.05% of the world total, 78.6 addresses per 1000 people (2012).
- Internet service providers: 2 ISPs (1999):
  - Consumer ADSL services are only offered by Grupo ICE.
  - Cable Modem services are offered by two companies countrywide, Cable Tica and Amnet. Several other companies offer local cable modem services.
  - Six new ISP licenses were awarded by regulator Sutel in June 2009. The licenses include the right to provide VoIP services.

=== Internet censorship and surveillance ===
There are no government restrictions on access to the Internet or credible reports that the government monitors e-mail or Internet chat rooms without judicial oversight.

The constitution provides for freedom of speech and press, and the government generally respects these rights in practice. An independent press, an effective judiciary, and a functioning democratic political system combine to ensure freedom of speech and press. Individuals are generally free to criticize the government openly without reprisal. The law limits hate speech in publications with regard to ethnic origin, race, or color.

The government continues to support legislation that imposes criminal penalties, including lengthy jail sentences instead of fines, for press infractions such as libel. Journalists believe such legislation promotes self-censorship. In July 2012 the president enacted Article 288, which includes amendments to the criminal code which establish a sentence of between four and eight years' imprisonment for any individual trying to obtain inappropriately secret political information. Journalists and media organizations criticized the law, arguing it restricted access to information of public interest.

== See also ==
- Radio Club de Costa Rica, a non-profit club for amateur radio enthusiasts.
- Media of Costa Rica
