= .cr =

Top-level Internet domain for Costa Rica

- Introduced: 10 September 1990
- TLD type: Country code top-level domain
- Status: Active
- Registry: NIC-Internet Costa Rica
- Sponsor: Academia Nacional de Ciencias (Costa Rica)
- Intended use: Entities connected with Costa Rica
- Actual use: Popular in Costa Rica
- Registered domains: 22,000+ (2017)
- Registration restrictions: Varying restrictions based on which second-level name is used
- Structure: Registrations are directly at second level, or at third level beneath several second-level labels
- DNSSEC: Yes
- Registry website: dominios.cr

.cr is the country code top-level domain (ccTLD) of Costa Rica.

== Second-level domains ==
- .ac.cr - Academic: Universities
- .co.cr - Commercial
- .ed.cr - Education: Colleges, High Schools, etc.
- .fi.cr - Financial institutions such as banks, etc.
- .go.cr - Governmental
- .or.cr - Non-profit organizations
- .sa.cr - Health related institutions.
- .cr - Other Uses

== Registrars ==
Domains can be bought directly at the registry or through accredited registrars.

== See also ==
- Internet in Costa Rica
