= Coat of arms of Costa Rica =

- Armiger: Republic of Costa Rica
- Adopted: 1848 (5 May 1998 alteration added smoke to volcanoes)
- Crest: An azure ribbon bearing the legend "AMÉRICA CENTRAL".
- Motto: REPÚBLICA DE COSTA RICA
- Other elements: A console or.

The official coat of arms of the Republic of Costa Rica was designed in 1848, with modifications in 1906, 1964, and 1998. The latest change was the addition of smoke to distinguish the three volcanoes.

== Pre-1821 colony of Spanish Empire ==
Before 1821, Costa Rica was part of the Spanish Empire and did not have a local coat of arms. The arms of the reigning monarch were used instead. The only city that had a local coat of arms was the city of Cartago, awarded by King Phillip II in 1565. After its independence from Spain in 1821, Costa Rica established different government boards trying to decide its future, debating between being independent (republicans) or join the Mexican Empire (imperialists). Lack of decision led to the Battle of Ochomogo on 5 April 1823, with the decision to remain independent and moving the capital city from Cartago to San José. Due to the long distances and difficult communication at the time, imperialists realized the Mexican Empire no longer existed since March 1823.

== Provisional Government ==
On May 10, 1823, the Provisional Assembly of Costa Rica decided that the Governing Board would implement the necessary measures to issue coins bearing a shield with the inscription "COSTA RICA LIBRE." The emblem was also to include a star in the center, a cannon, and a palm stalk at the bottom.

== Federal and state arms ==
In March 1824, when Costa Rica joined the United Provinces of Central America arms promulgated by the new republic's constitution became the arms of the State of Costa Rica. This coat of arms consists of a triangle, in which five volcanoes rise out of the sea symbolizing the five member states of the United Provinces; above the volcanoes is a shining red Phrygian cap and a rainbow. This coat of arms with small changes is still used by the national coat of arms of El Salvador and Nicaragua.

On 2 November 1824, Costa Rica adopted its first coat of arms as a state within the federation which showed the right side of a naked male's chest and extended arm surrounded by a circle of green mountains and the legend free state of Costa Rica.

== Arms of an independent state ==
In 1840, after Costa Rica's withdrawal from the federation, a new coat of arms was adopted, the first for Costa Rica as a sovereign and independent state. It consisted of an eight-pointed shining star in a blue field surrounded by a yellow circle with the legend State of Costa Rica. This coat of arms was suppressed in 1842 by Francisco Morazán during his failed bid to reunite the Federal Republic of Central America. The 1824 arms were used during this period.

== Historical coat of arms of the republic ==
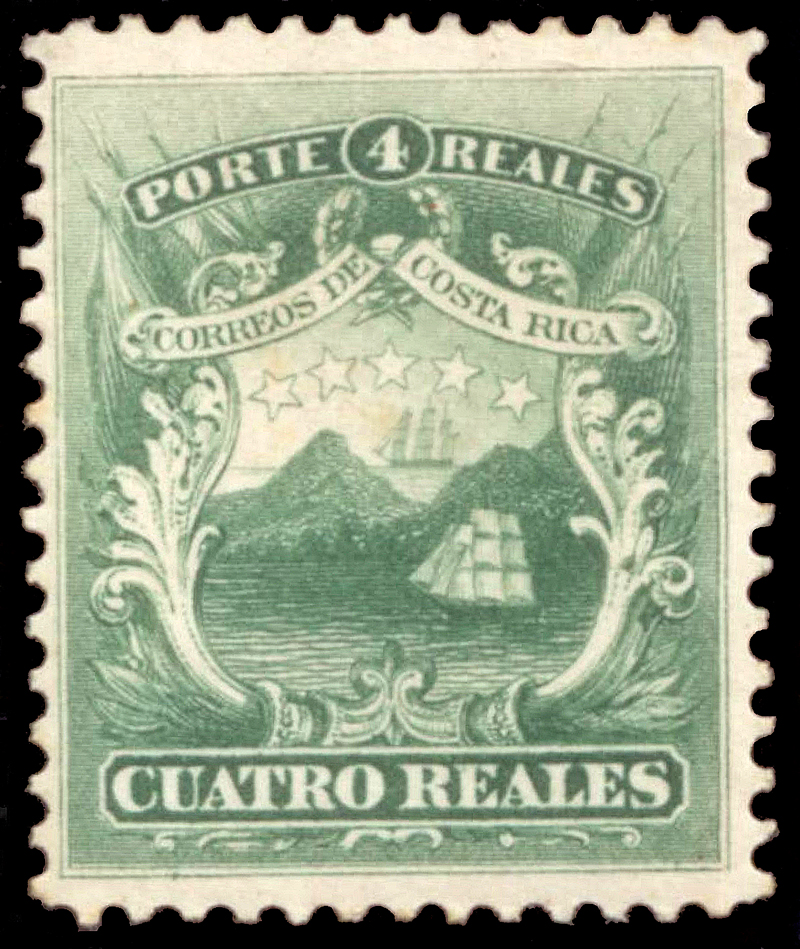
The design of the 1848 coat of arms was featured on the first Costa Rican postal stamp, issued in 1863.

The basis of the current national coat of arms of Costa Rica was adopted 29 September 1848, during the presidency of Dr Jose Maria Castro Madriz together with the new flag. Both designs are attributed to Pacifica Fernandez, wife of Mr Castro Madriz. These arms were significantly modified by law number 18 of 27 November 1906, which eliminated the military symbols, national flags and horn of plenty contained in the 1848 design.

In 1964 two stars were added to the original five in order to complete seven, which by then was the number of provinces of the country. In 1848, when the original design was adopted the current provinces of Puntarenas and Limon had not reached that status.

On 5 May 1998, by Executive Decree No. 26853-SP, the coat of arms was given its current form, including the smoking volcanoes. Before this date, the three mountains did not show smoke coming out of their tops.

As officially described, the coat of arms represents: three volcanoes (one for each of the three mountain ranges in the country) and an extensive valley between two oceans (Pacific Ocean and Caribbean Sea) with a merchant ship in each one (representing the maritime history of the country). In the horizon a rising sun. All are surrounded by a golden frame with golden beads (coffee). Two palms close the arms joined by a white ribbon with the motto "República de Costa Rica" in gold. An arch of seven stars represent the provinces of the republic. The arms are crowned by a blue ribbon with the motto "America Central".

Coat of arms of the Federal Republic of Central America from 1823 to November 1824

Coat of arms of the Federal Republic of Central America from November 1824 to November 1840

Coat of arms of the Free State of Costa Rica within the Federal Republic of Central America from 2 November 1824 to 15 November 1840. Also used again by the independent state of Costa Rica from September 1842 to September 1848

Coat of arms of the independent State of Costa Rica from April 1840 to April 1842

Coat of arms of Costa Rica from September 1848 to November 1906

Coat of arms of Costa Rica from November 1906 to 1964

Coat of arms of Costa Rica from 1964 to 1998

== See also ==
- Flag of Costa Rica
