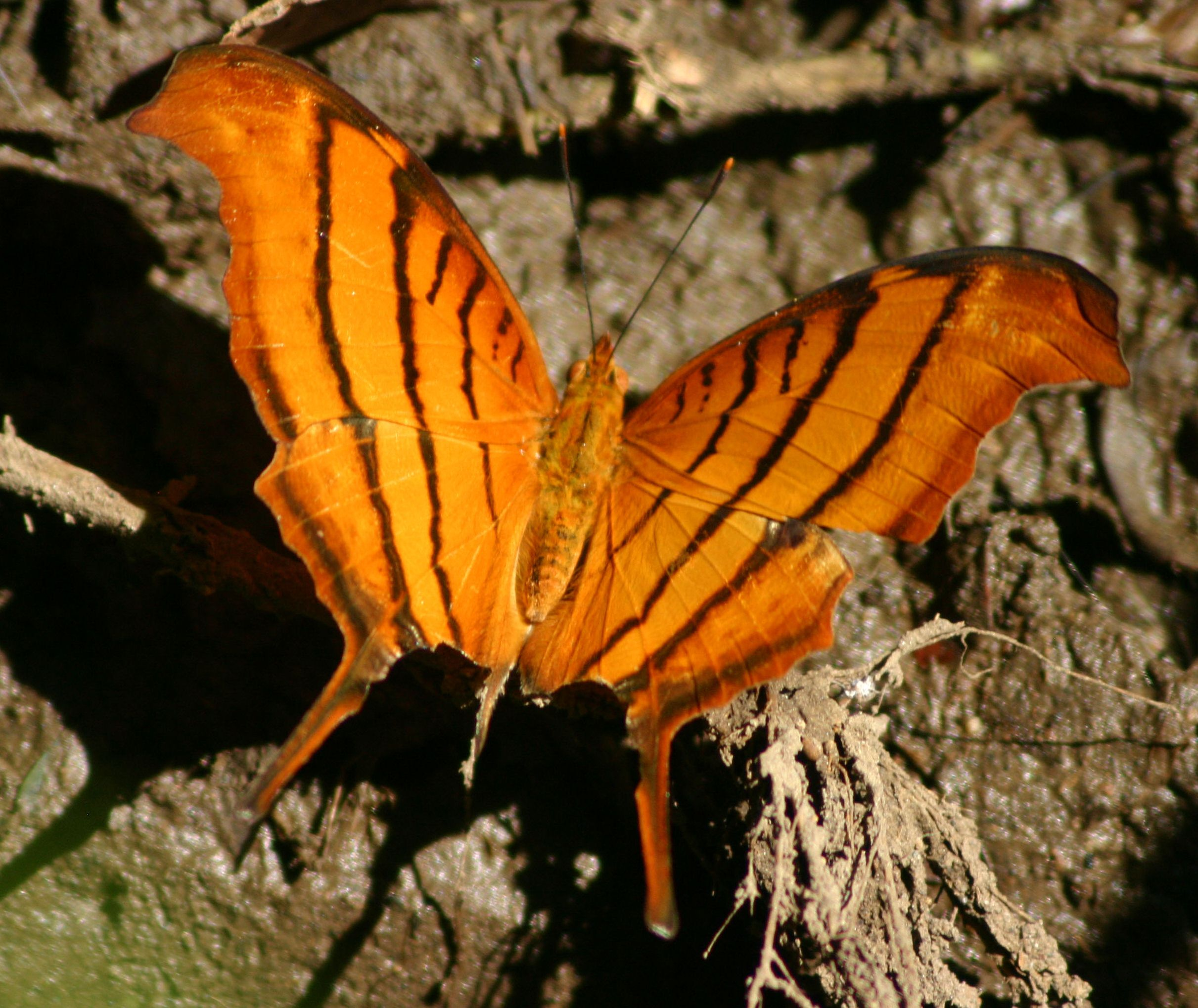
- in Dominica

Scientific classification
- Kingdom: Animalia
- Phylum: Arthropoda
- Clade: Pancrustacea
- Class: Insecta
- Order: Lepidoptera
- Family: Nymphalidae
- Genus: Marpesia
- Species: M. petreus

Binomial name
- Marpesia petreus (Cramer, 1776)

= Marpesia petreus =

Ruddy daggerwing

Species of butterfly

Marpesia petreus, the ruddy daggerwing, is a species of butterfly belonging to the family Nymphalidae. It is found in Brazil north through Central America, Mexico, and the West Indies to southern Florida. Strays are found as far north as Arizona, Colorado, Nebraska, Kansas, and southern Texas.

The wingspan is 70–95 mm.

The larvae feed on Ficus carica, Ficus pumila, and Ficus citrifolia.
