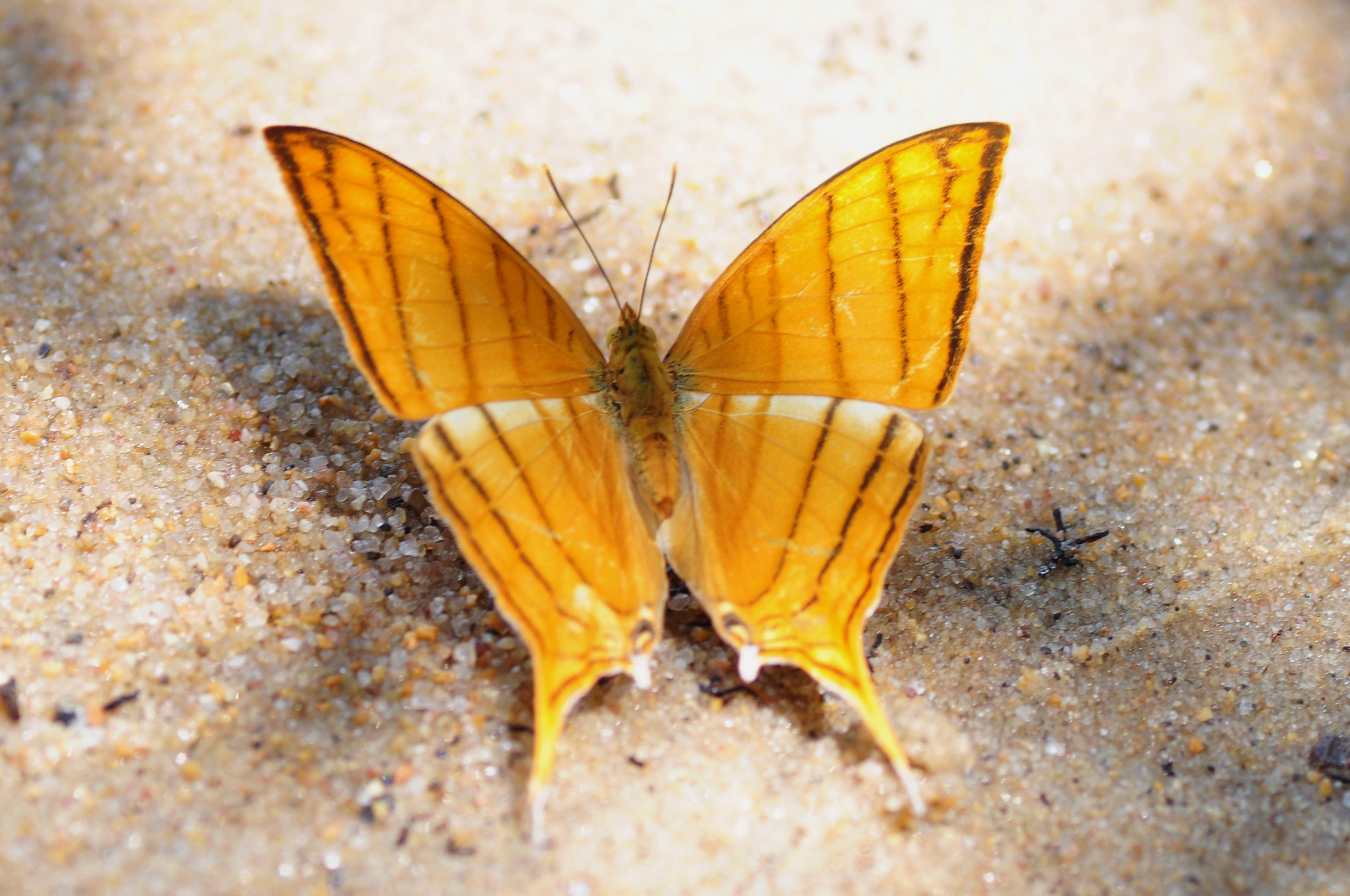

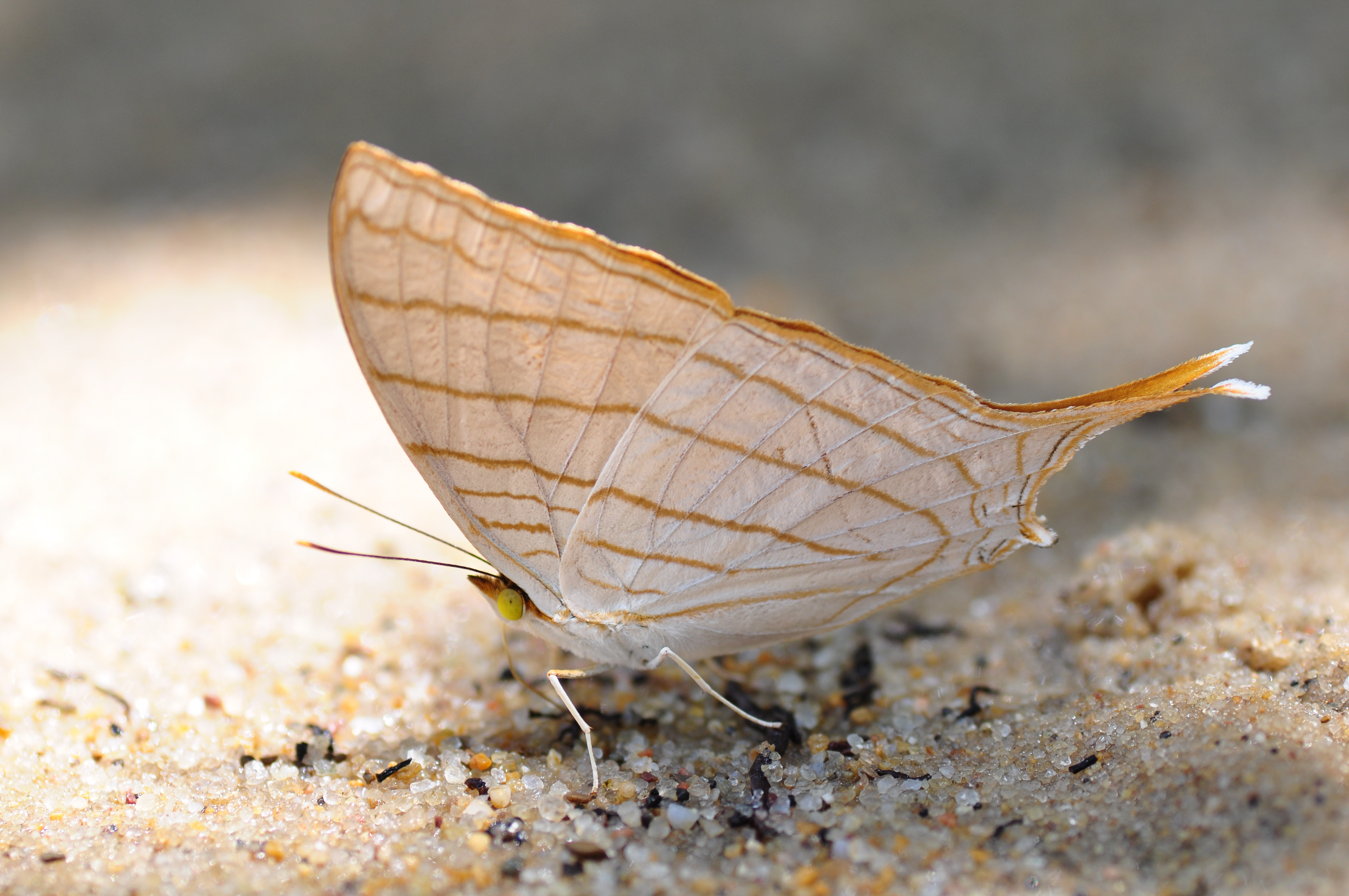

Scientific classification
- Domain: Eukaryota
- Kingdom: Animalia
- Phylum: Arthropoda
- Class: Insecta
- Order: Lepidoptera
- Family: Nymphalidae
- Genus: Marpesia
- Species: M. harmonia

Binomial name
- Marpesia harmonia (Klug, 1836)

Synonyms
- Nymphalis harmonia Klug, 1836; Timetes harmonia

= Marpesia harmonia =

Pale daggerwing

Species of butterfly

Marpesia harmonia, the pale daggerwing or Harmonia daggerwing, is a butterfly of the family Nymphalidae. It is found in south-eastern Mexico and Guatemala.
