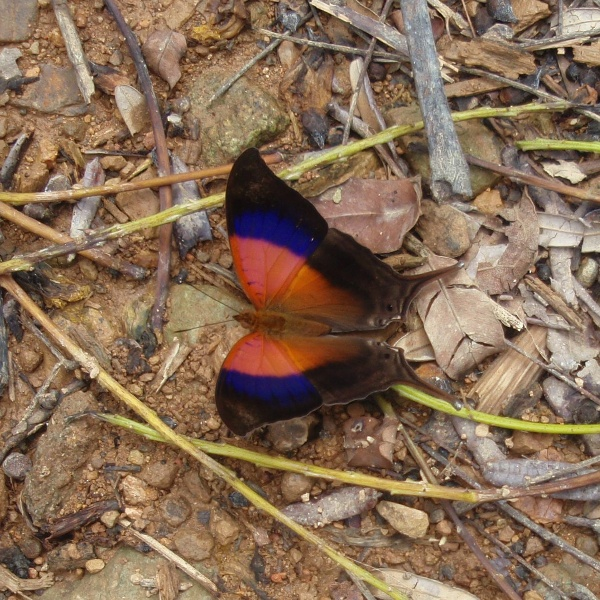
- M. f. iole, Osa Peninsula, Costa Rica
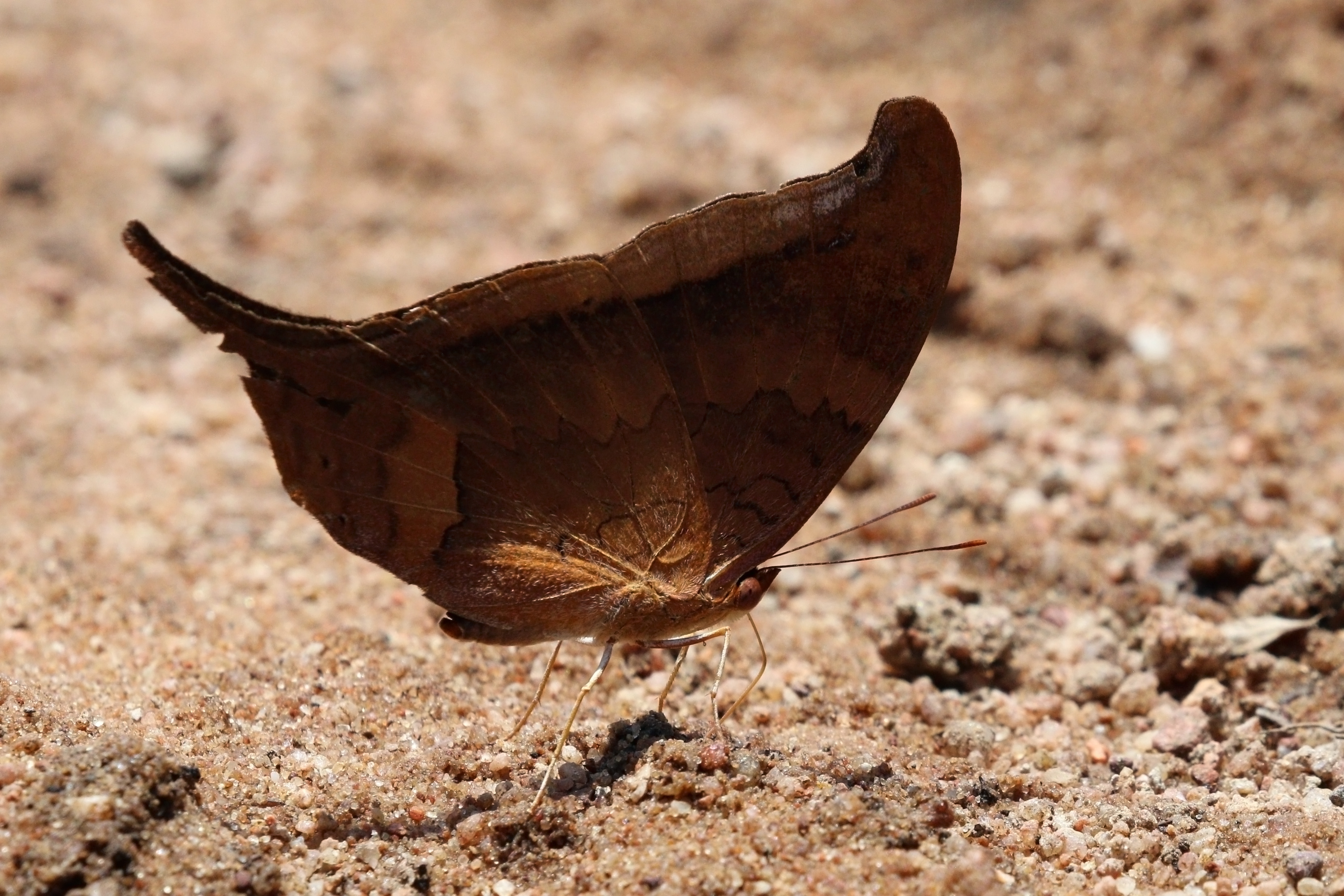
- M. f. oechalia, Cristalino River, Southern Amazon, Brazil

Scientific classification
- Domain: Eukaryota
- Kingdom: Animalia
- Phylum: Arthropoda
- Class: Insecta
- Order: Lepidoptera
- Family: Nymphalidae
- Genus: Marpesia
- Species: M. furcula

Binomial name
- Marpesia furcula (Fabricius, 1793)

Synonyms
- Papilio furcula Fabricius, 1793; Papilio iole Drury, 1782; Papilio jole Stoll, 1790 (preocc. Denis & Schiffermüller, 1775); Marpesia zosteria Hübner, [1819]; Timetes furcula oechalia Westwood, 1850; Timetes hermione C. & R. Felder, 1861; Timetes heraldicus Bates, 1865; Timetes funestis Butler, 1869; Megalura iole argentina Martin, [1923]; Megalura hermione peruura Bryk, 1953

= Marpesia furcula =

Species of butterfly

Marpesia furcula, the sunset daggerwing or glossy daggerwing, is a species of butterfly of the family Nymphalidae. It is found in Central and South America, from Nicaragua to Bolivia and Argentina. The habitat consists of evergreen rainforests at altitudes up to 1,400 meters.

== Subspecies ==
- Marpesia furcula furcula (Jamaica)
- Marpesia furcula oechalia (Westwood, 1850) (Ecuador, Peru, Bolivia, Brazil: Amazonas, Argentina)
- Marpesia furcula violetta (Hall, 1929) (western Ecuador)
