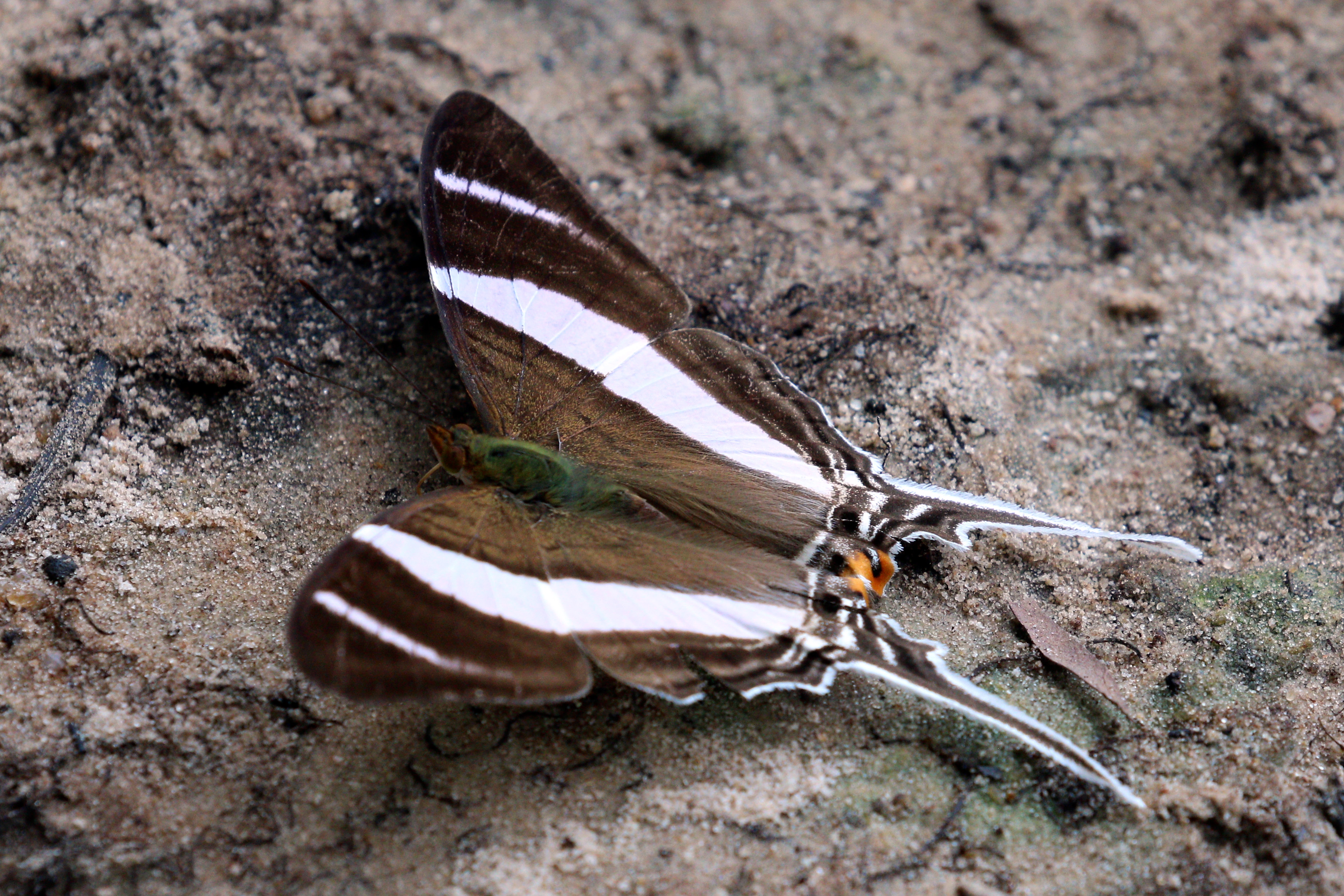

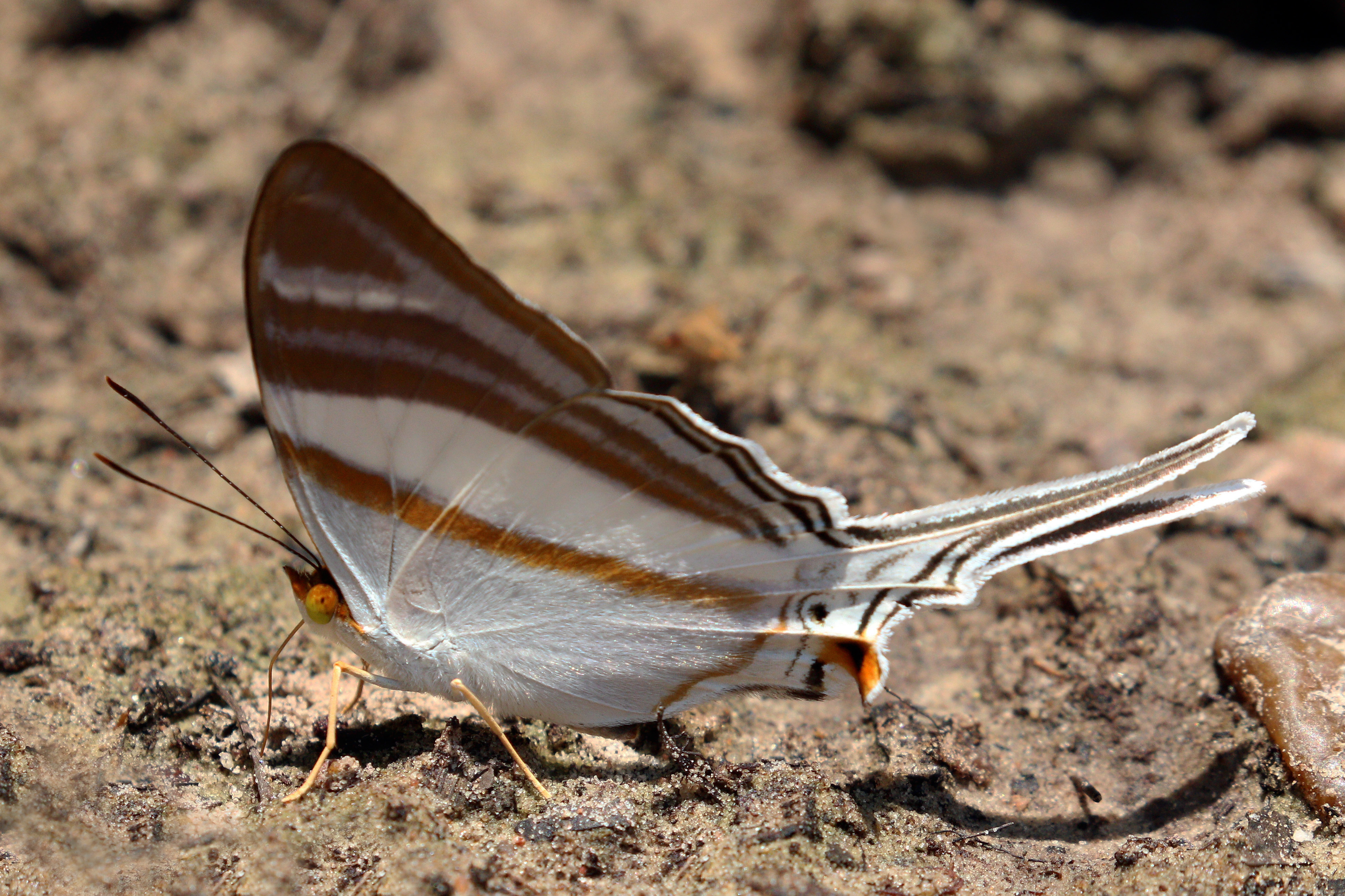

Scientific classification
- Kingdom: Animalia
- Phylum: Arthropoda
- Class: Insecta
- Order: Lepidoptera
- Family: Nymphalidae
- Genus: Marpesia
- Species: M. orsilochus

Binomial name
- Marpesia orsilochus (Fabricius, 1776)

= Marpesia orsilochus =

Species of butterfly

Marpesia orsilochus, the Orsilochus daggerwing, is a species of butterfly of the family Nymphalidae. It is found in Suriname and Brazil. The habitat consists of evergreen rainforests.

The dorsal upperside is dark brown with a bright white band across all wings. The hindwing has a long slender tail.
