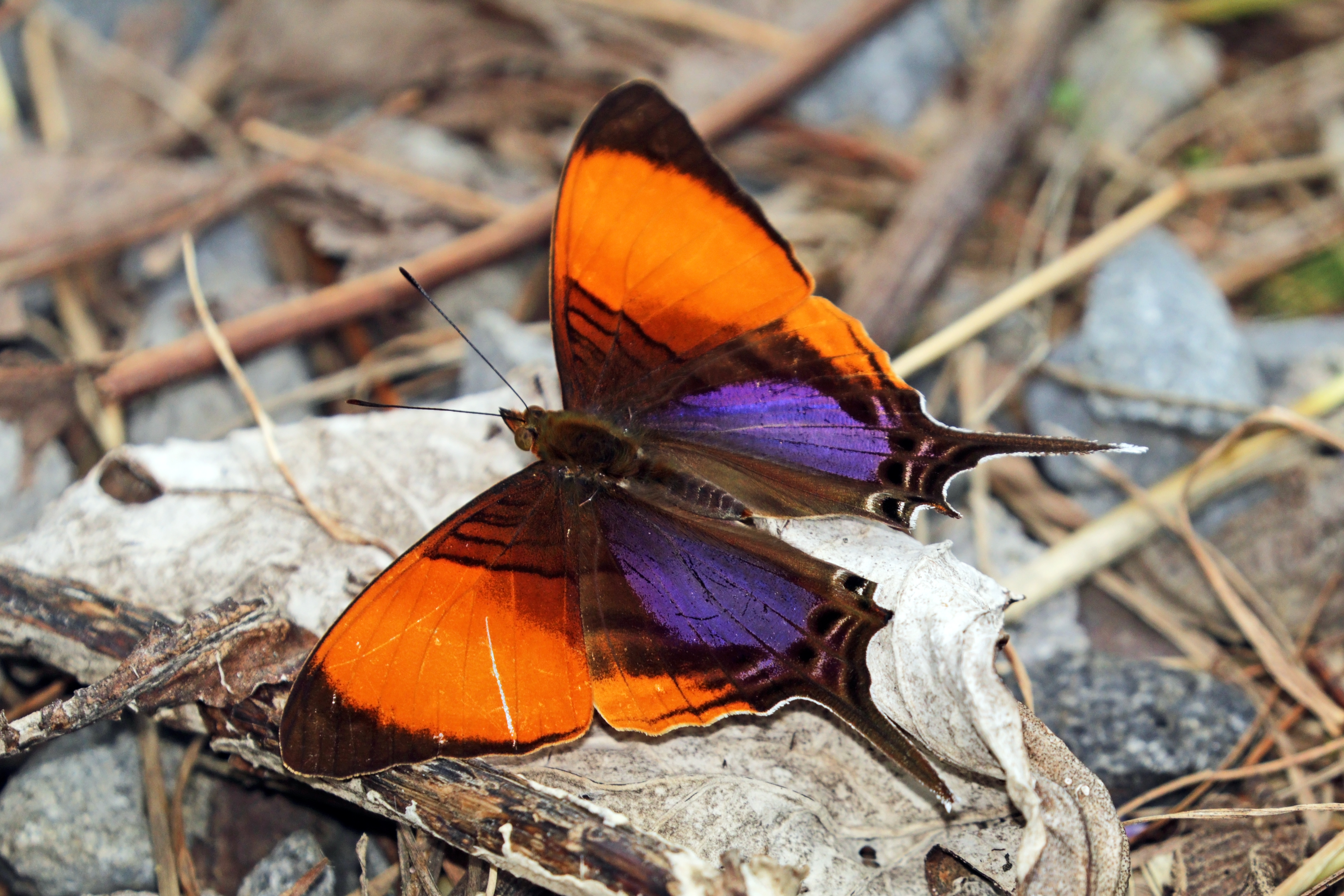
- Purple-stained daggerwing Marpesia marcella valetta, Panama
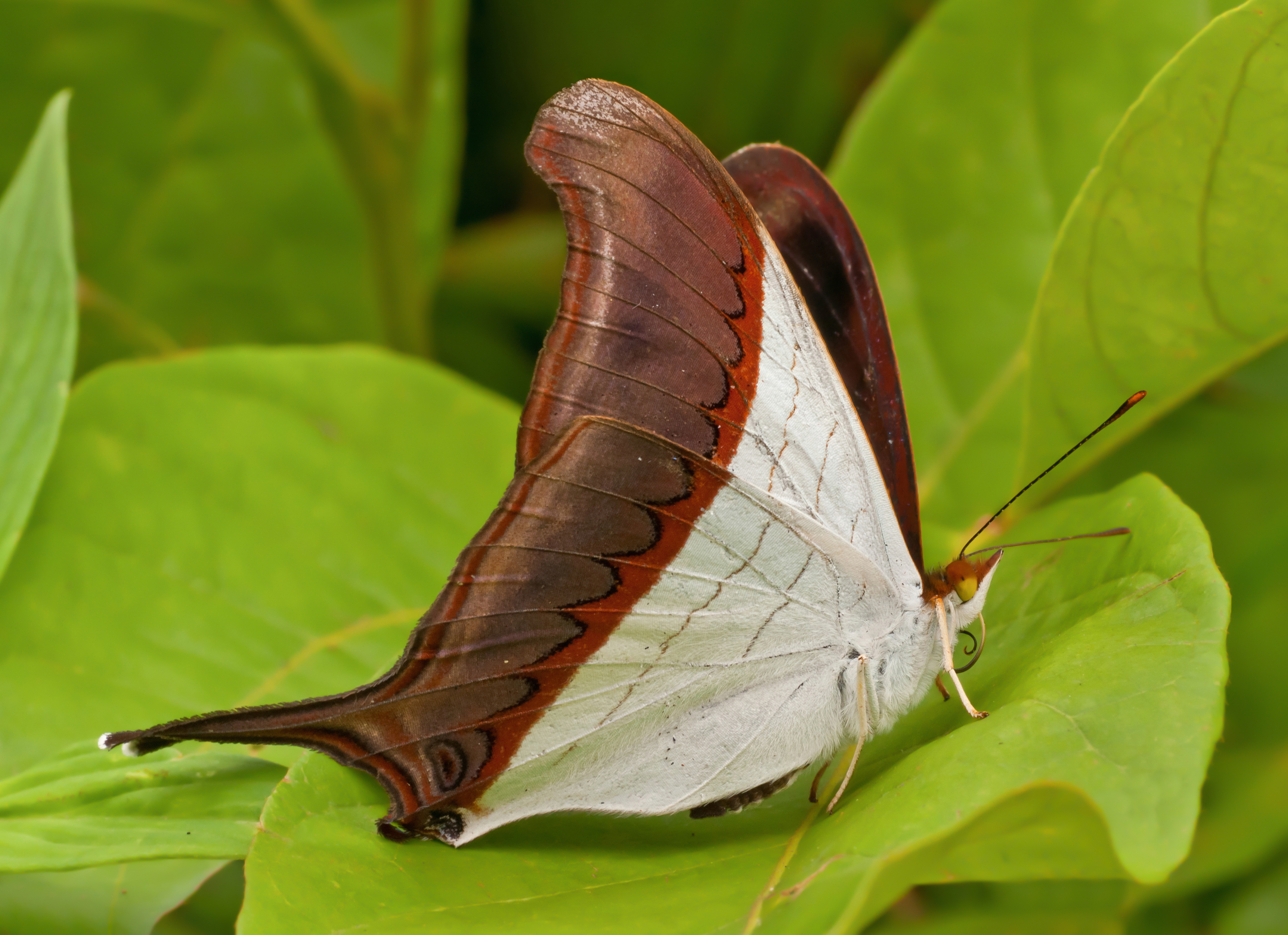
- Marpesia zerynthia in the Venezuelan Andes

Scientific classification
- Domain: Eukaryota
- Kingdom: Animalia
- Phylum: Arthropoda
- Class: Insecta
- Order: Lepidoptera
- Family: Nymphalidae
- Subfamily: Cyrestinae
- Genus: Marpesia; Hübner, 1818

Species
- See text

Synonyms
- Athena Hübner, [1819]; Euglyphus Billberg, 1820; Marius Swainson, [1830]; Petreus Swainson, [1833]; Megalura Blanchard, 1840; Timetes Doubleday, 1844; Tymetes Doyère, [1840]; Tymetes Boisduval, [1846]; Timetes Boisduval, 1870 (preocc. Timetes Doubleday, 1844); Eumargareta Grote, 1898

= Marpesia (butterfly) =

Genus of brush-footed butterflies

Marpesia is a butterfly genus in the family Nymphalidae. The species of this genus are found in the Neotropical and Nearctic realms.

== Species ==
The genus includes the following species, listed alphabetically:

- Marpesia berania (Hewitson, 1852) – amber daggerwing (Mexico, Colombia Ecuador, Brazil (Amazonas), Peru, Honduras)
- Marpesia chiron (Fabricius, 1775) – many-banded daggerwing (southern United States, Haiti, Jamaica, Cuba, Mexico to Ecuador, Suriname)
- Marpesia corinna (Latreille, [1813]) – Corinna daggerwing (Colombia, Peru)
- Marpesia corita (Westwood, 1850) – orange-banded daggerwing (Mexico, Guatemala, Honduras)
- Marpesia crethon (Fabricius, 1776) – Crethon daggerwing (Suriname, Peru, Ecuador, Colombia, Venezuela)
- Marpesia egina (Bates, 1865) – Egina daggerwing (Brazil (Amazonas), Peru)
- Marpesia eleuchea Hübner, 1818 – Antillean daggerwing (Cuba, Bahamas, Dominican Republic, Antilles)
- Marpesia furcula (Fabricius, 1793) – sunset daggerwing (Nicaragua, Panama, Ecuador, Peru, Bolivia, Brazil (Amazonas), Argentina)
- Marpesia harmonia (Klug, 1836) – pale daggerwing or Harmonia daggerwing (Mexico)
- Marpesia livius (Kirby, 1871) – Livius daggerwing (Mexico to Panama, Bolivia, Peru, Ecuador)
- Marpesia marcella (C. & R. Felder, 1861) – pansy daggerwing (Guatemala, Costa Rica, Panama, Ecuador, Colombia, Peru)
- Marpesia merops (Doyère, [1840]) – dappled daggerwing (Guatemala to Bolivia)
- Marpesia orsilochus (Fabricius, 1776) – Orsilochus daggerwing (Suriname, Brazil)
- Marpesia pantepuiana (Costa, Attal & Viloria, 2016) - (Venezuela)
- Marpesia petreus (Cramer, [1776]) – ruddy daggerwing (United States (Texas, Florida), Guadelope, Mexico)
- Marpesia themistocles (Fabricius, 1793) – Norica daggerwing (Ecuador, Peru, Brazil (Amazonas))
- Marpesia tutelina (Hewitson, 1852) – Tutelina daggerwing (Brazil (Amazonas))
- Marpesia zerynthia Hübner, [1823] – waiter daggerwing (United States (Texas), Colombia, Peru, Ecuador Brazil (Bahia))
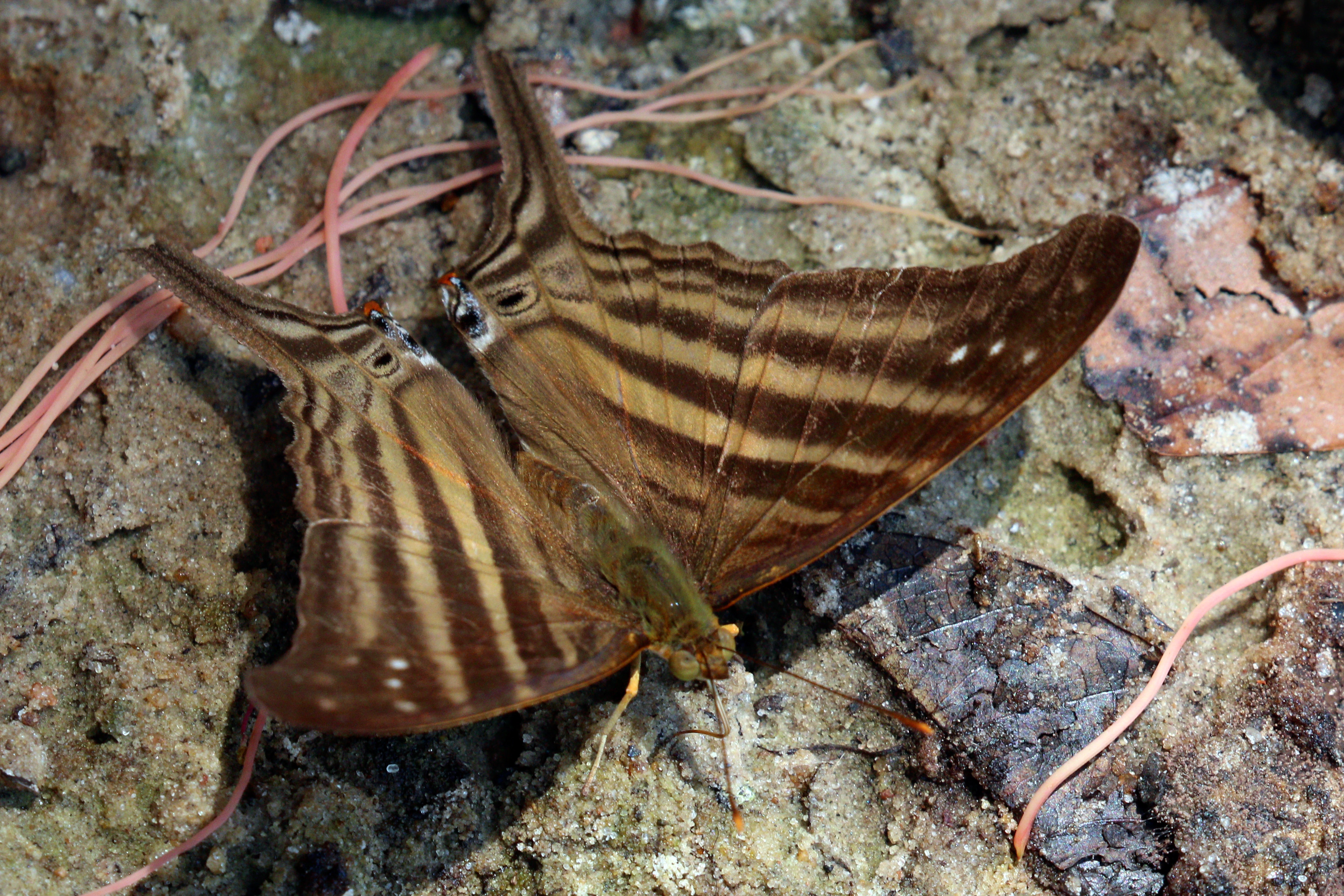
M. chiron
southern Amazon, Brazil

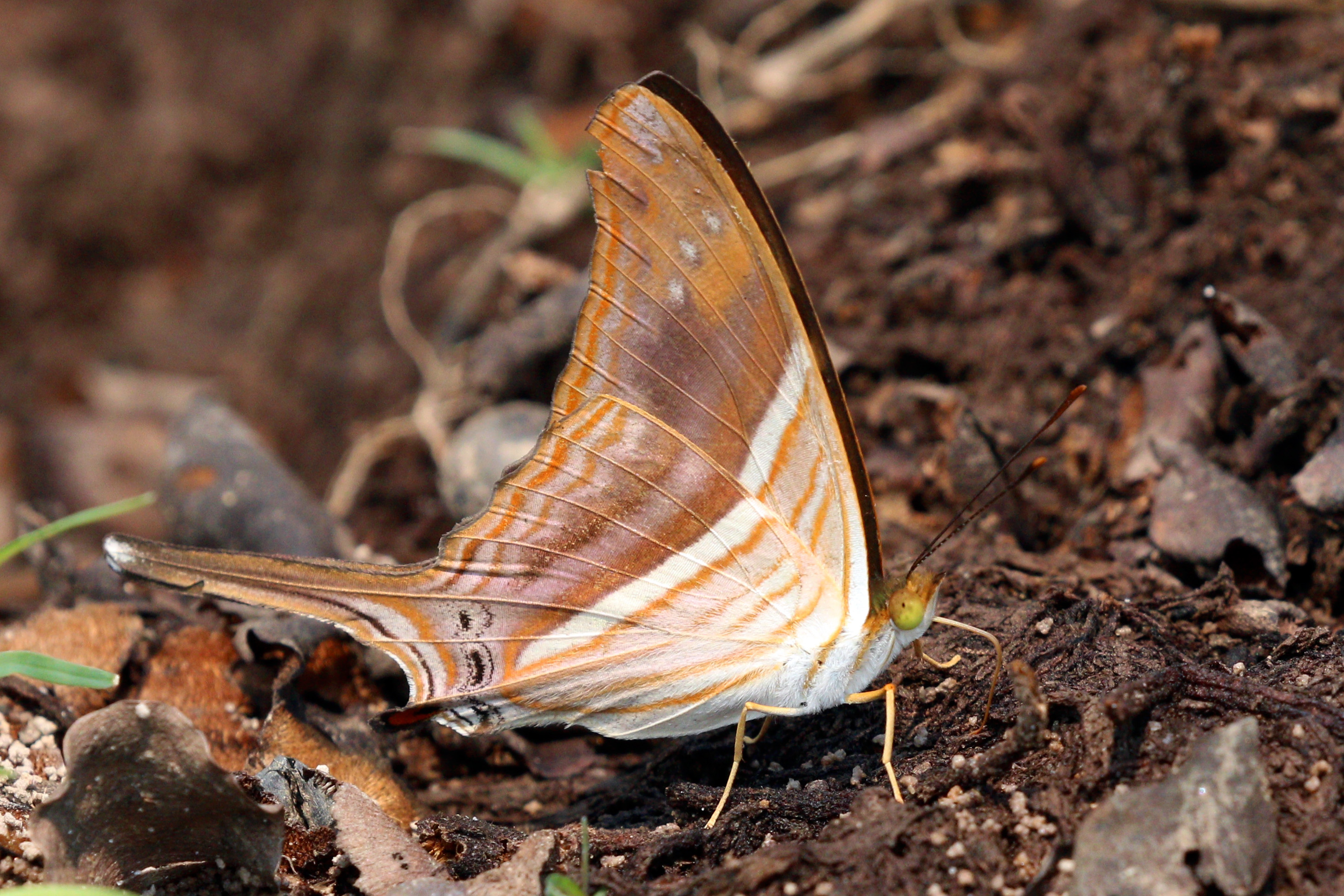
M. chiron
the Pantanal, Brazil

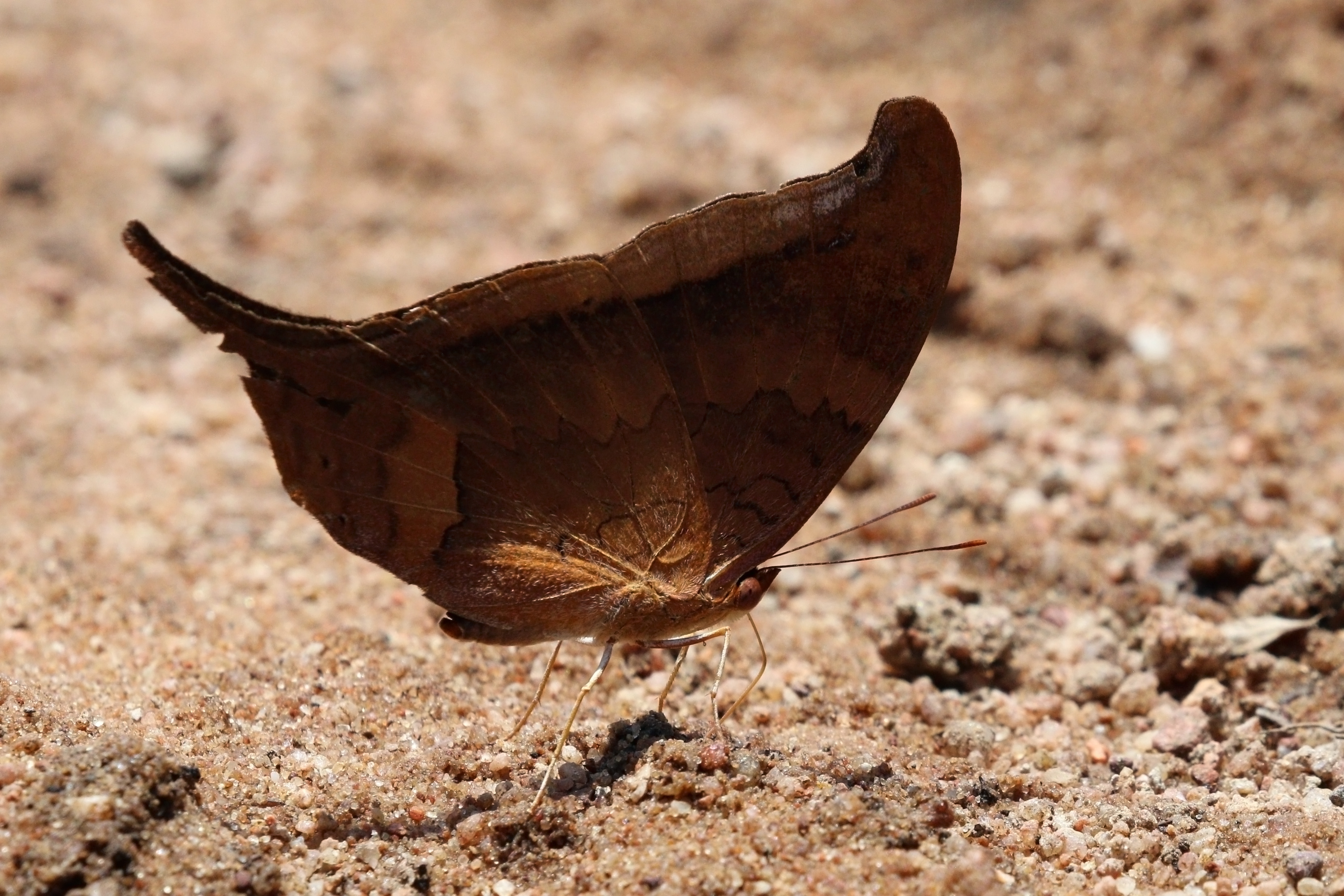
M. furcala
southern Amazon

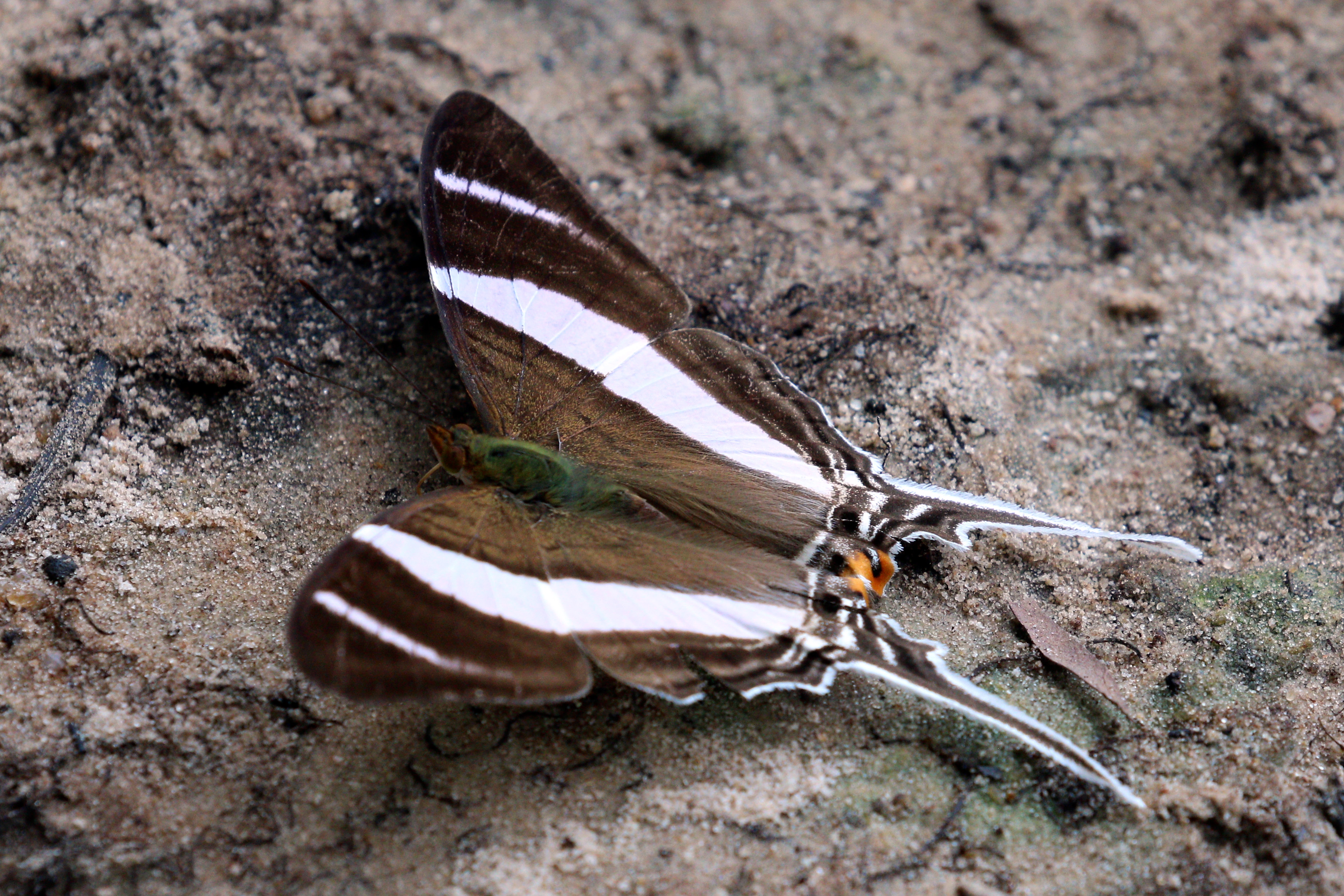
M. orsilochus
southern Amazon

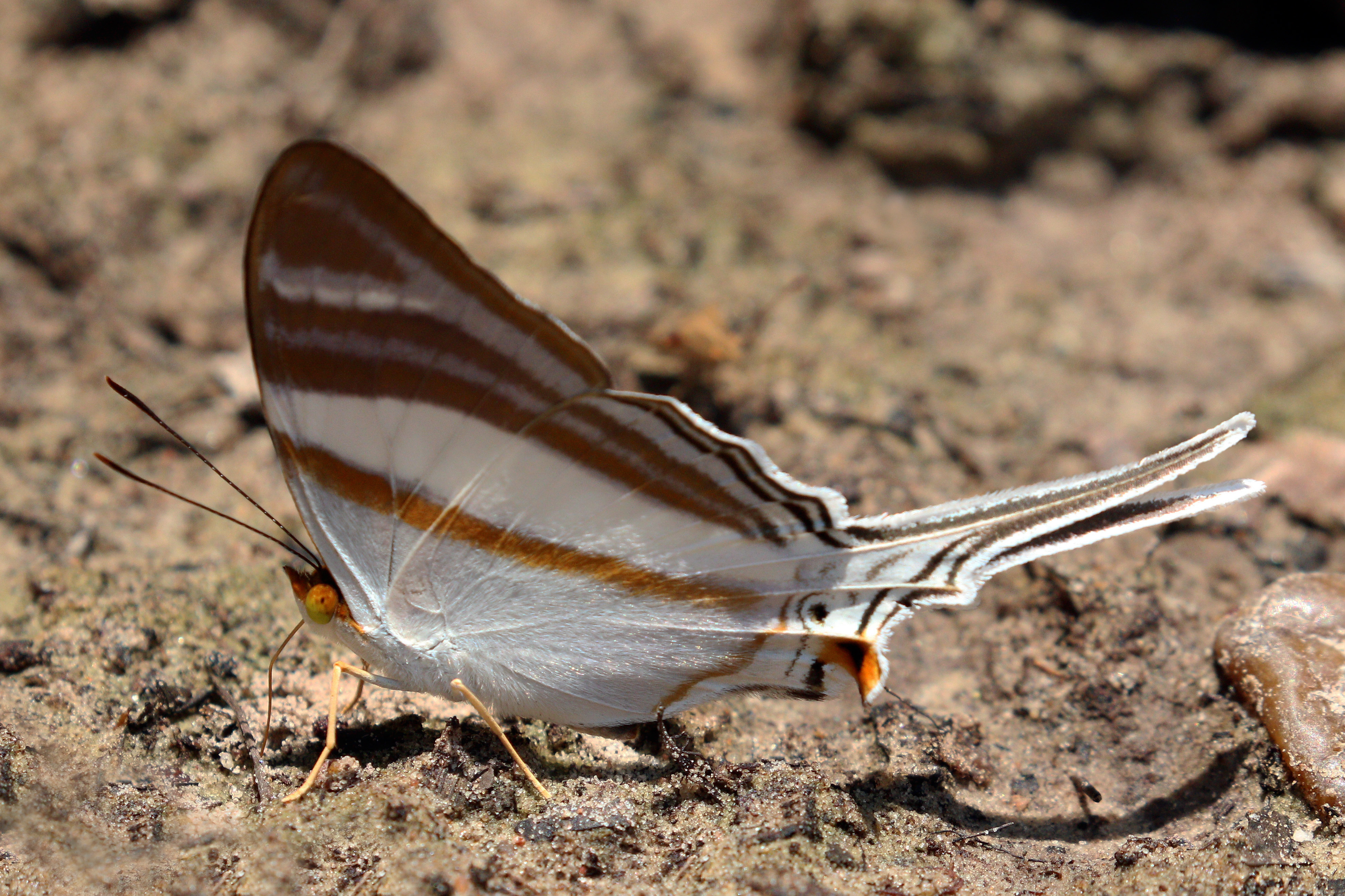
M. orsilochus
southern Amazon
