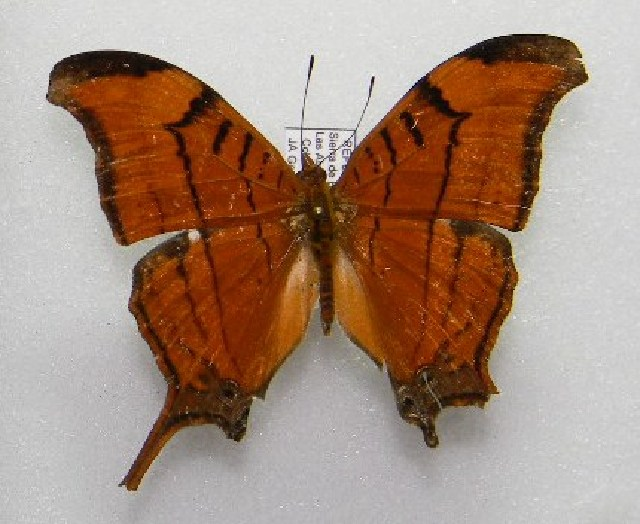

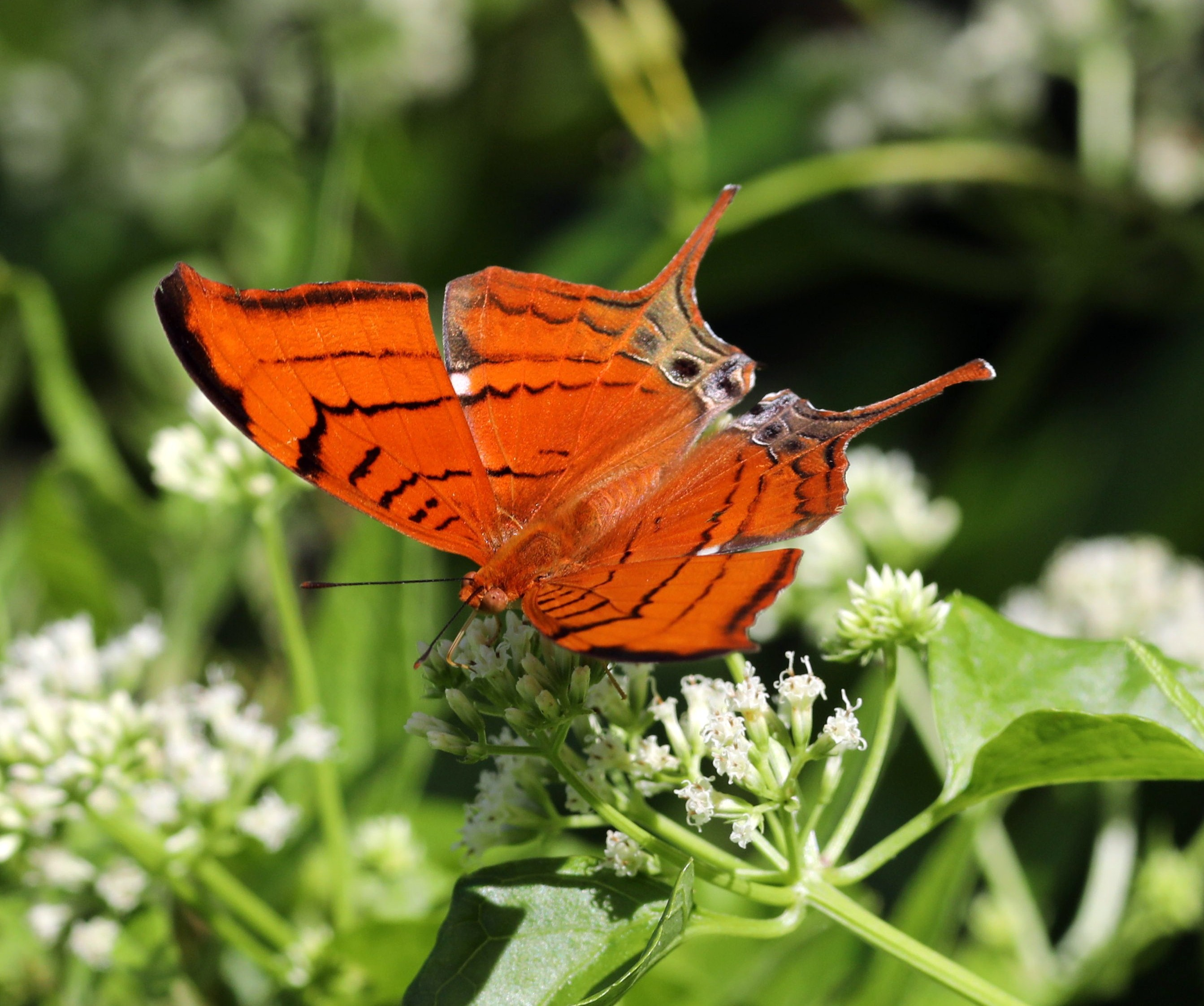

Scientific classification
- Kingdom: Animalia
- Phylum: Arthropoda
- Clade: Pancrustacea
- Class: Insecta
- Order: Lepidoptera
- Family: Nymphalidae
- Genus: Marpesia
- Species: M. eleuchea

Binomial name
- Marpesia eleuchea Hübner, 1818

Synonyms
- Nymphalis pellenis Godart, [1824]

= Marpesia eleuchea =

Species of butterfly

Marpesia eleuchea, the Antillean daggerwing, is a species of butterfly of the family Nymphalidae. It is found in the West Indies. Occasional strays can be found in the Florida Keys.

The wingspan is 67–83 mm. Adults feed on the nectar of various flowers, including Tournefortia, Cordia, Lantana, and Eupatorium species.

The larvae feed on Ficus species.

== Subspecies ==
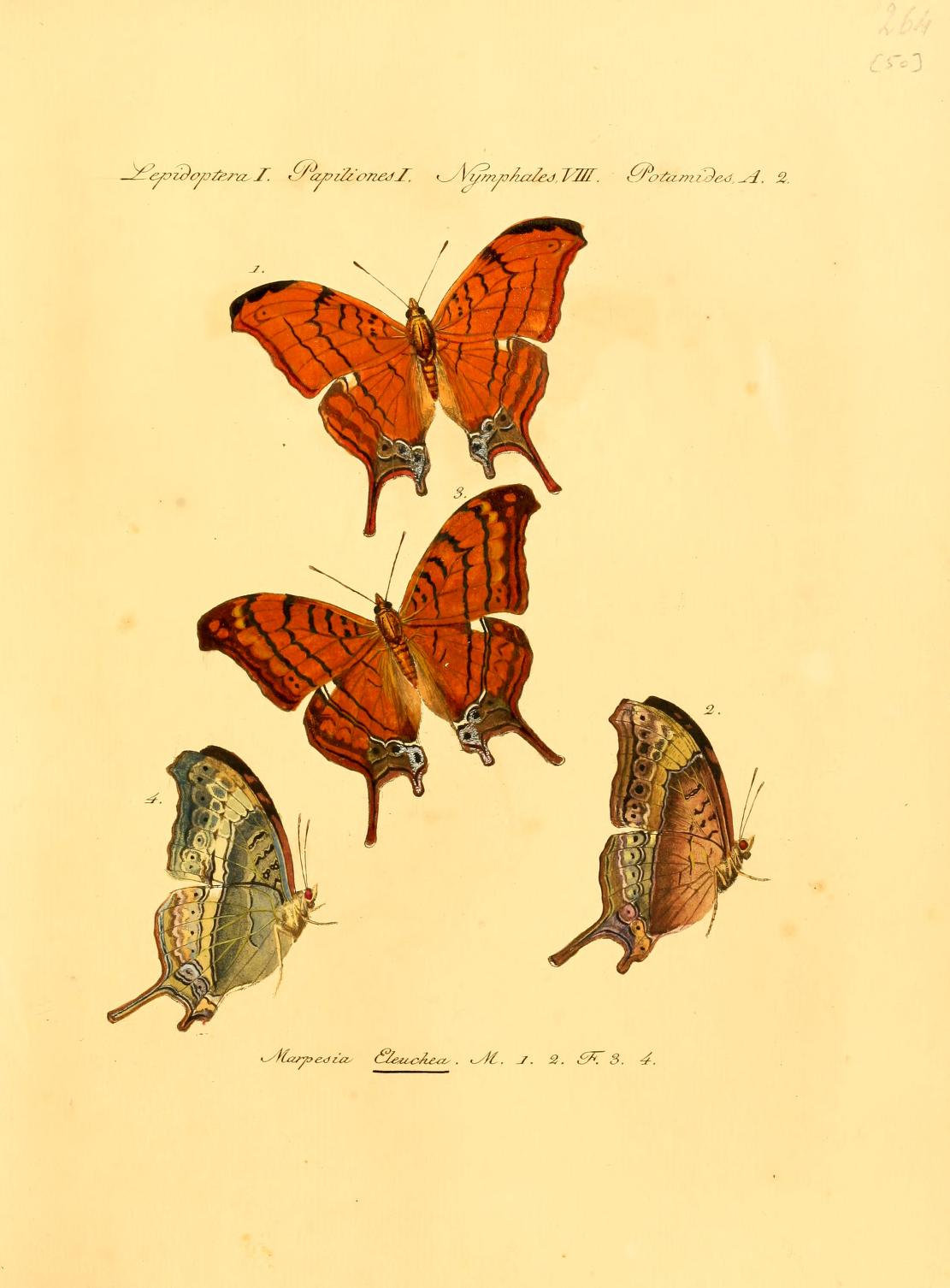
Plate accompanying Jacob Hübner's original description

- Marpesia eleuchea eleuchea (Cuba)
- Marpesia eleuchea bahamensis Munroe, 1971 (Bahamas)
- Marpesia eleuchea dospassosi Munroe, 1971 (Dominican Republic)
- Marpesia eleuchea pellenis (Godart, [1824]) (Antilles)
