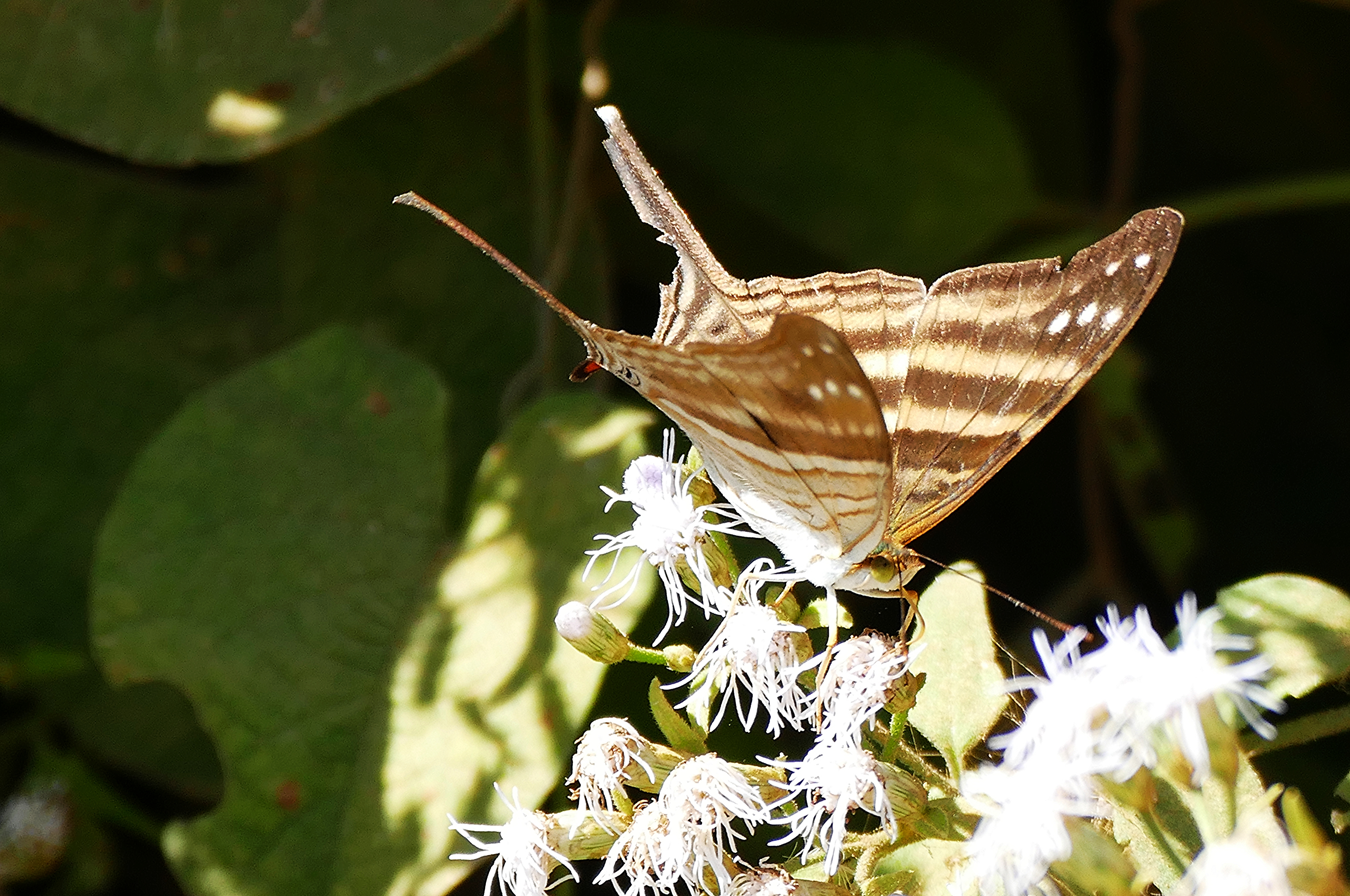

Scientific classification
- Domain: Eukaryota
- Kingdom: Animalia
- Phylum: Arthropoda
- Class: Insecta
- Order: Lepidoptera
- Family: Nymphalidae
- Genus: Marpesia
- Species: M. chiron

Binomial name
- Marpesia chiron (Fabricius, 1775)

= Marpesia chiron =

Species of butterfly

Marpesia chiron, the many-banded daggerwing, is a species of daggerwings, map butterflies in the family Nymphalidae. It is found in Central America, North America, and South America.

The MONA or Hodges number for Marpesia chiron is 4549.

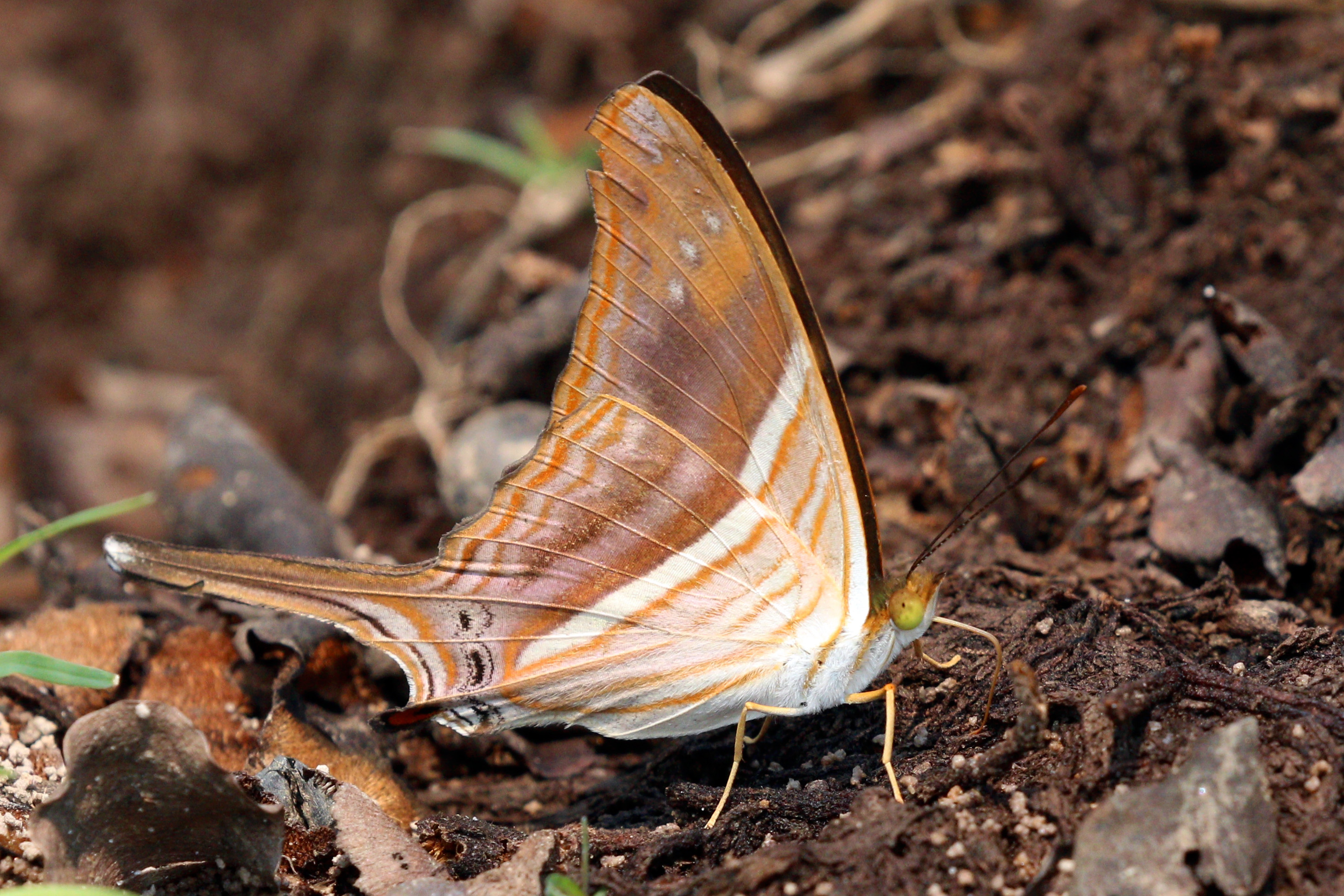
Many-banded daggerwing, Marpesia chiron

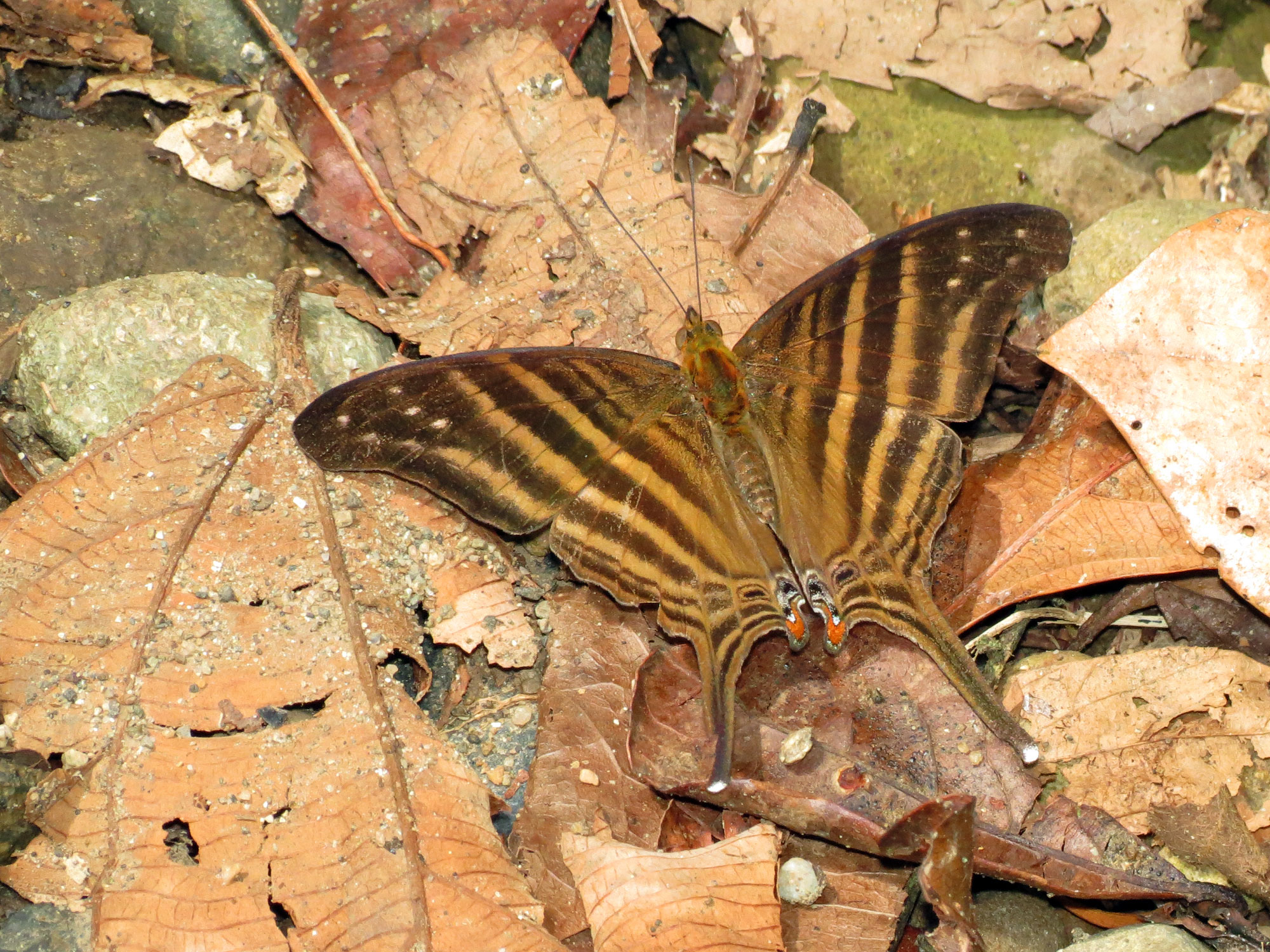
Many-banded daggerwing, Marpesia chiron

== Subspecies ==
These two subspecies belong to the species Marpesia chiron:

- Marpesia chiron chiron
- Marpesia chiron insularis Fruhstorfer
