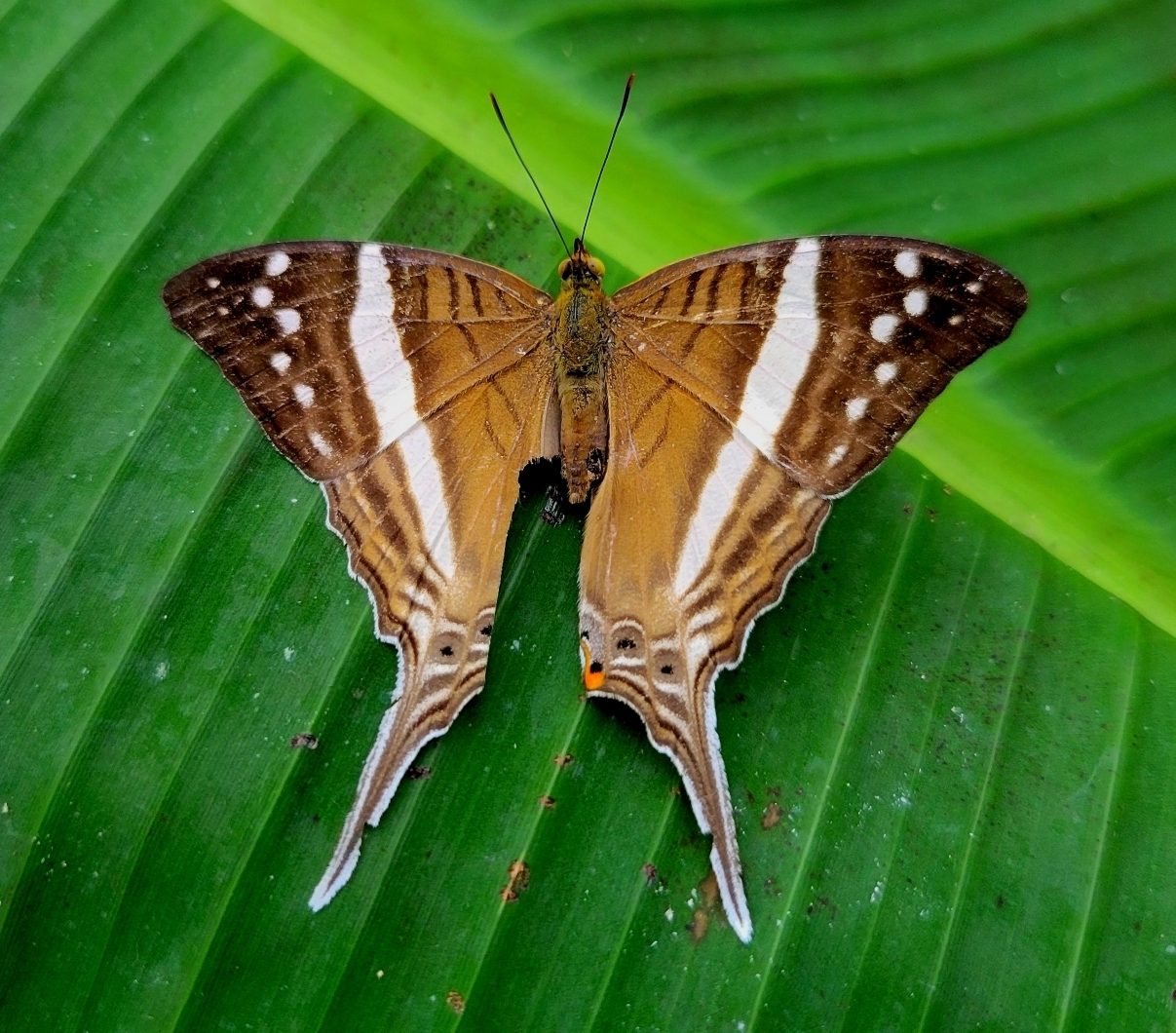
- in Ecuador
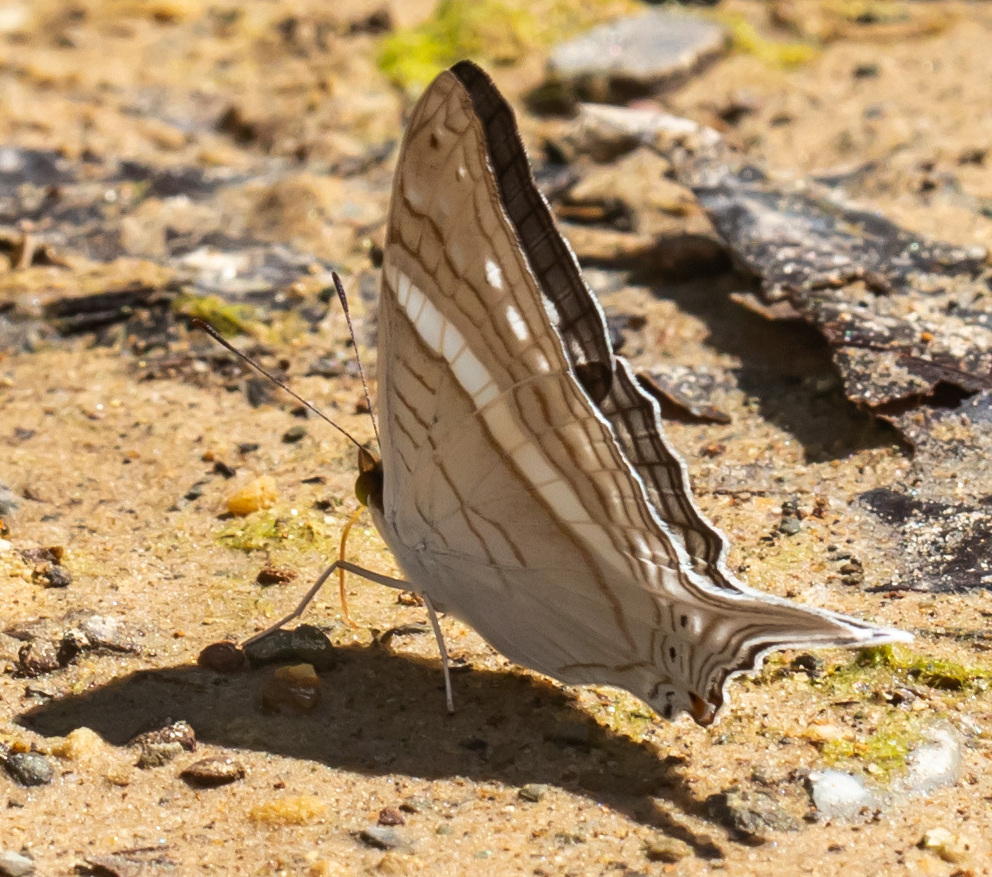
- in Peru

Scientific classification
- Kingdom: Animalia
- Phylum: Arthropoda
- Class: Insecta
- Order: Lepidoptera
- Family: Nymphalidae
- Genus: Marpesia
- Species: M. crethon

Binomial name
- Marpesia crethon (Fabricius, 1776)

Synonyms
- Papilio crethon Godart, [1824]; Timetes catulus C. & R. Felder, 1861

= Marpesia crethon =

Crethon daggerwing

Species of butterfly

Marpesia crethon, the Crethon daggerwing, is a species of butterfly of the family Nymphalidae. It is found in northern South America.
