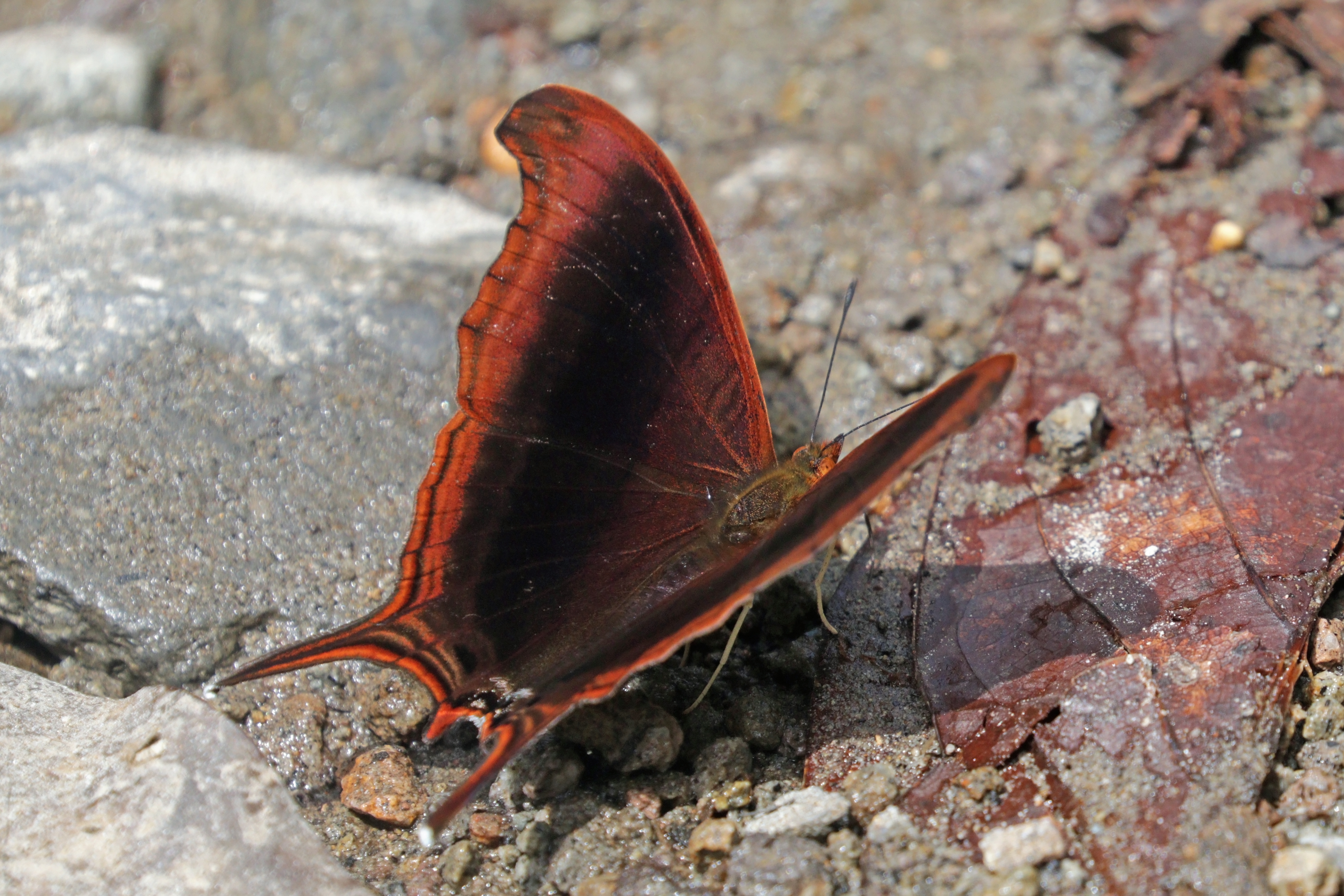
- M. z. dentigera, Panama
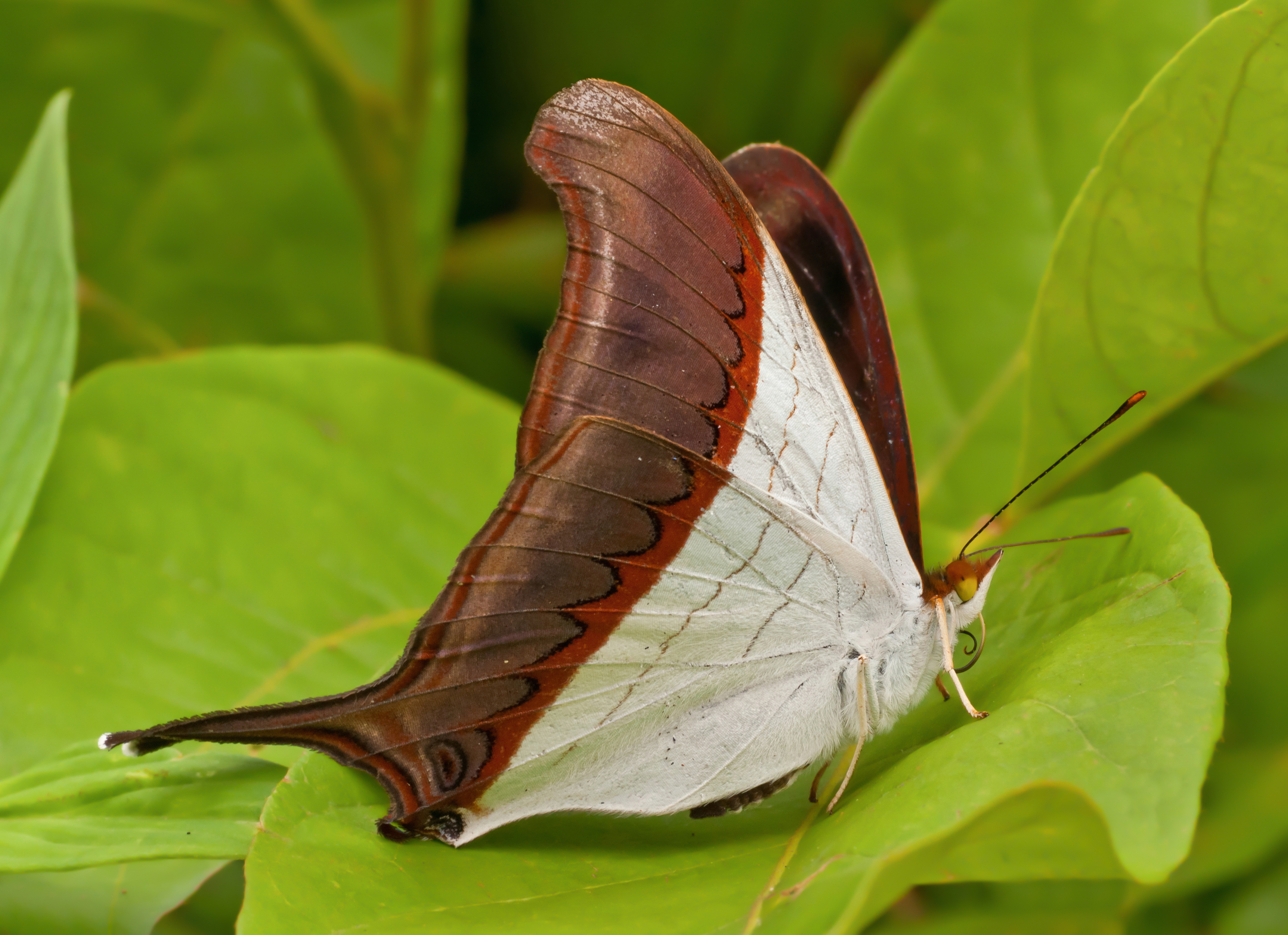
- Andes mountains of Venezuela, approximately 1000 meters asl

Scientific classification
- Kingdom: Animalia
- Phylum: Arthropoda
- Clade: Pancrustacea
- Class: Insecta
- Order: Lepidoptera
- Family: Nymphalidae
- Genus: Marpesia
- Species: M. zerynthia

Binomial name
- Marpesia zerynthia Hübner, [1823]

Synonyms
- Nymphalis coresia Godart, [1824]; Papilio sylla Perty, 1833; Megalura zerynthia dentigera Fruhstorfer, 1907; Marpesia coresia (Godart, 1824)

= Marpesia zerynthia =

Species of butterfly

Marpesia zerynthia, the waiter, is a species of butterfly in the family Nymphalidae. Primarily found in Mesoamerica, it can also be observed in regions slightly north and south of this area.

== Distribution ==
The distribution of Marpesia zerynthia is limited to the Neotropical realm. Specifically, it is known to occur in the South American countries of Peru, Bolivia, Colombia and northern Brazil. It also occurs in Mesoamerica, including central Mexico, and vagrants may rarely be observed as far north as Texas, United States. This species inhabits tropical deciduous and evergreen forests, and maycan be found in open areas. Marpesia zerynthia occurs at altitudes up to 2,400 m. It is generally a cloud-forest species, and so it is most common between approximately 800 to 1,800 m.

== Biology ==
=== Ovum ===
Eggs are laid singly on the leaves of trees and shrubs in the family Moraceae, which includes the genera Ficus (figs), Chlorophora, Brosimum and Artocarpus. Conical in shape, the eggs have 11 vertical ribs, as well as many less prominent horizontal ribs. The horizontal ribs are spaced further apart from each other, the further they are from the top of the egg. A micropyle is located at the very top. The egg is red when first laid, but eventually becomes black before eclosion.

=== Larva ===
After eclosion, the young caterpillar is generally cylindrical, lacking ornamentation on the head or body. The head capsule is lustrous black, and the remainder of the body is a transparent pale green. The mature caterpillar is quite colorful, usually marked with yellow and/or red stripes and spots. A single row of unbranched spines runs along the back. The head is decorated with a pair of very long spines. The larvae feed on leaves of the plant on which they were laid. The larvae rest on the upper surface of the foliage, and feed diurnally. They are indiscriminately intolerant of the presence of any intruder, even of other larvae of the same species. As a defense mechanism, when disturbed, the larva will violently move its spiny head from one side to the other until the disturbance ceases.

=== Pupa ===
The angular pupae are pale green, marked with darker spots. Spines project outwards down the head and the abdomen. At the base of the wing case is a sharp black spike. A bifurcate spine, short and thick in shape, projects from the mesothorax. Two black spots are present on the back of the head, and orange or yellow coloration, developing to dark brown, is visible at the intersections between body segments.

=== Imago ===
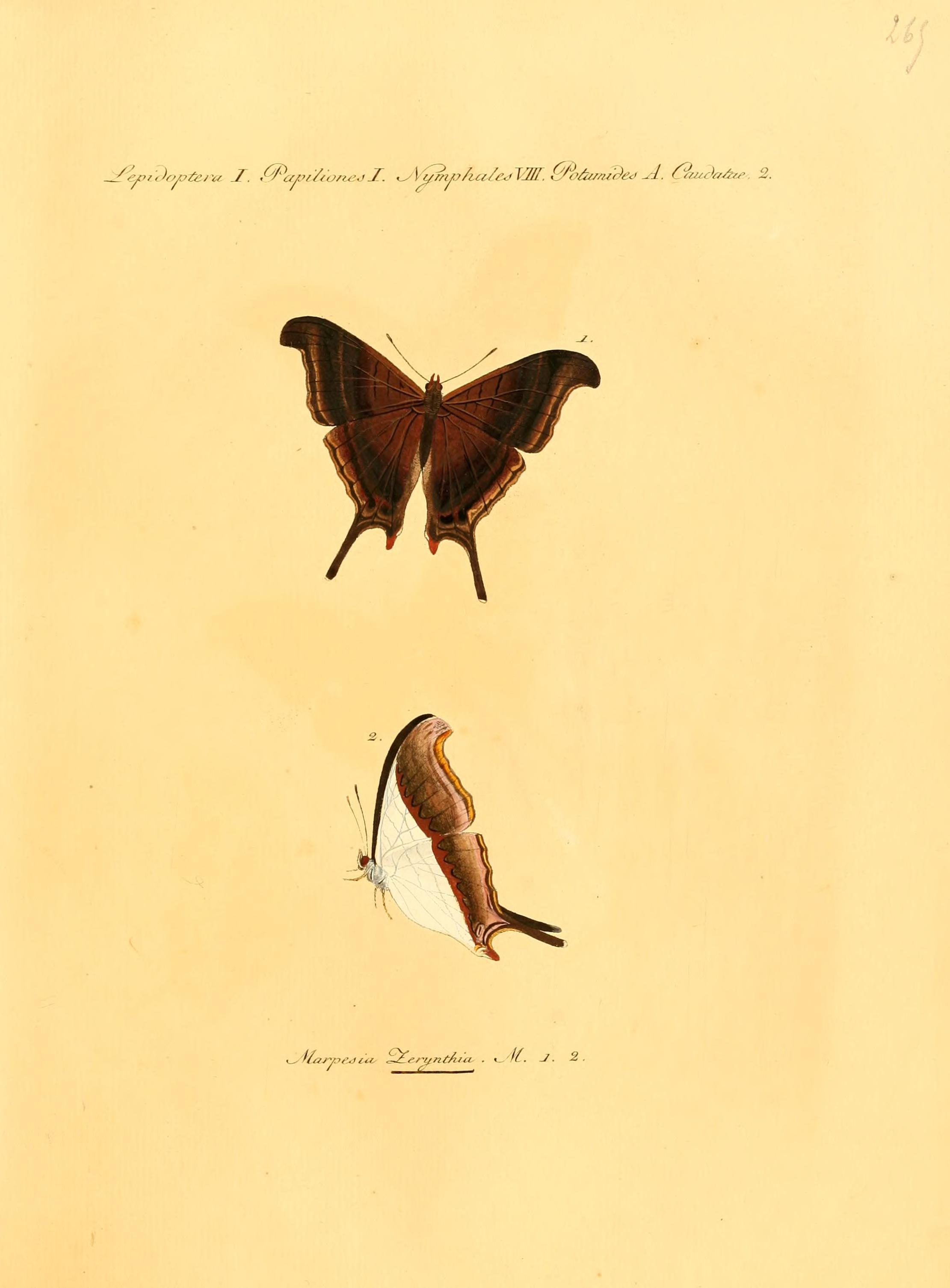
Plate accompanying Hübner's original 1823 description

Development from egg to adult takes 32 days or less. The wingspan of the adult is 7 - 8.1 cm (2.8 - 3.2 in). The hindwing has a long, slender tail. The dorsal side is dark brown with paler margins. The ventral side of both the hindwing and forewing have a white inner section and dark brown section closer to the wing margins. The species is slightly sexually dimorphic, with females typically being rounder and larger than the males. Specimens reared in captivity have a tendency to be smaller than those caught in the wild.

== Behavior ==
Marpesia zerynthia is typically encountered in small groups of approximately six to twelve males, which are attracted to wet sand and mud to drink from the moisture, rich in minerals. Particularly favored feeding locations are shallow fords in streams or along mountain roads. During hot weather, the butterflies flutter constantly and feed with wings erect or partially open. When the conditions are cooler they hold their wings completely outspread for insolation, making it possible to observe the dark brown coloration of the ventral surface of the wings. Adults fly quickly and nimbly, and are often known to perch together in small groups under leaves. In Mexico, they usually fly from May to November, or July to October in South Texas. Nutrition is obtained from the nectar of Cordia and Croton, and from excrement and various other non-floral sources. Females are more elusive, rarely descending from the forest canopy. However, in overcast weather, they are sometimes known to settle on lower foliage in the forest.

== Taxonomy ==
=== Subspecies ===
Two subspecies are recognized:

- Marpesia zerynthia zerynthia – Brazil: Bahia
- Marpesia zerynthia dentigera (Fruhstorfer, 1907) – Texas to Colombia, Peru, and possibly Ecuador

=== Synonymy ===
Invalid names historically assigned to Marpesia zerynthia include:

- Nymphalis coresia Godart, [1824]
- Papilio sylla Perty, 1833
- Megalura zerynthia dentigera Fruhstorfer, 1907
- Marpesia coresia (Godart, 1824)

== See also ==
- List of butterflies of Mexico
- List of Lepidoptera of Honduras
