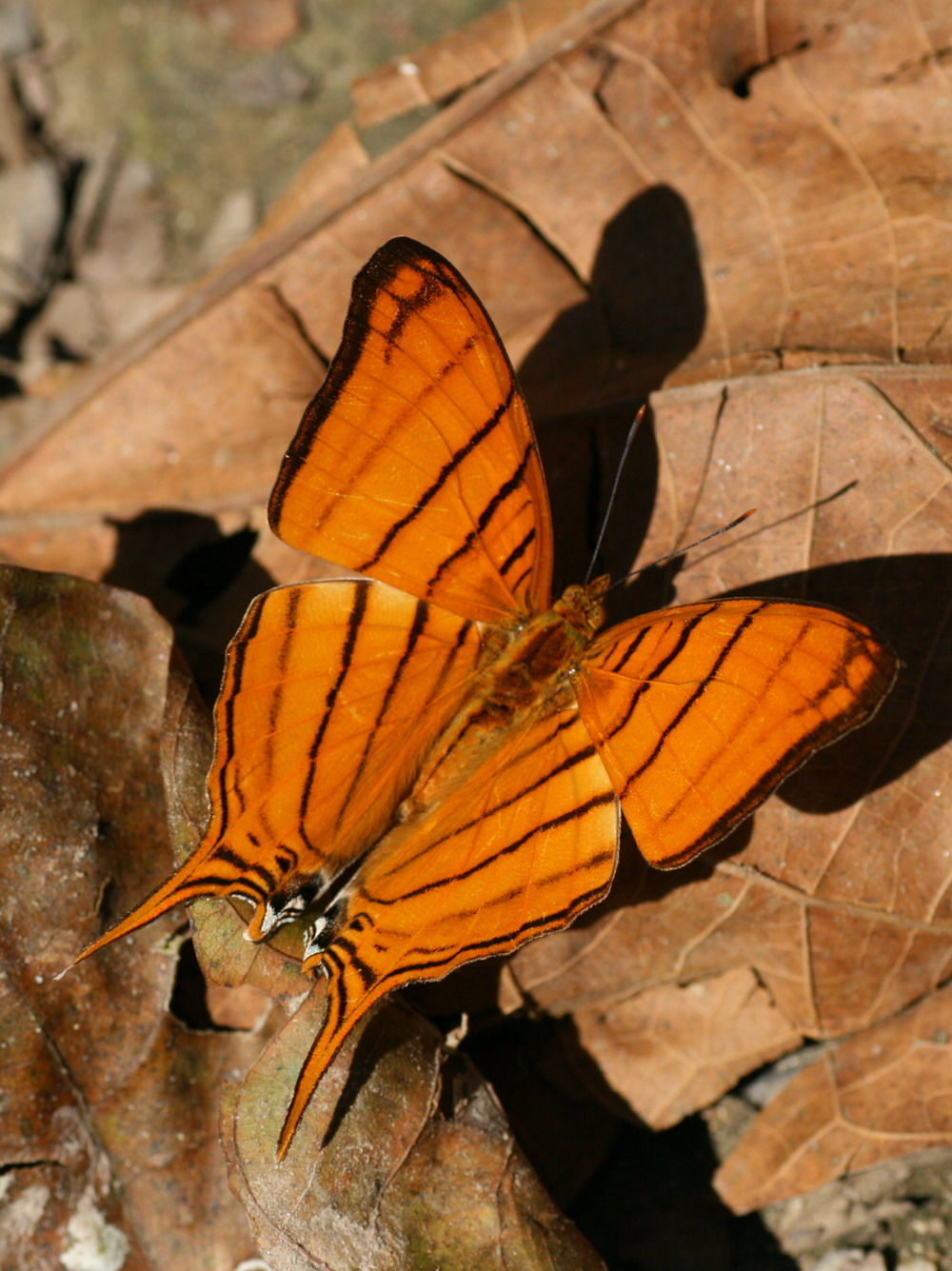
- In Tingo María, Peru

Scientific classification
- Kingdom: Animalia
- Phylum: Arthropoda
- Clade: Pancrustacea
- Class: Insecta
- Order: Lepidoptera
- Family: Nymphalidae
- Genus: Marpesia
- Species: M. berania

Binomial name
- Marpesia berania (Hewitson 1852)

= Marpesia berania =

Species of insect

Marpesia berania, the amber daggerwing, is a butterfly in the family Nymphalidae. The species was first described by William Chapman Hewitson in 1852. They are a brightly colored, Neotropical butterfly with a unique wing shape, found in Central and northern South America. The amber daggerwing exhibits several interesting characteristics varying from their unusual behavior to their physical traits that make them so distinct.

== Etymology ==
The genus name Marpesia is derived from Marpess, the wife of Idas, a mortal who decided to go against Apollo when he carried off Marpessa /ˌmɑːrˈpɛsə/ (Ancient Greek: Μάρπησσα). The derivation of berania is not known.

== Distribution ==
The distribution range for Marpesia berania is largely in the Neotropical realm, branching out to Central America and northern South America. Countries inhabited by this species include Mexico, Honduras, Costa Rica, Brazil, Peru, Colombia and Bolivia. These butterflies are considered to be a commonly found species in Honduras and in Peru. M. berania is found in the tropical rainforests and lowlands of these regions. They are considered to be closely allied or related to the Cyrestis (mapwing butterflies) and Chersonesia (maplet butterflies).

=== Occurrences ===
M. berania is seen most in January, February, and March. In 2020, 3-8 individuals were spotted each of these three months, with the most individuals (8) occurring in March. In contrast, the butterflies appeared absent from April to October 2020, with only one individual spotted in May, August, and October.

== Life cycle ==
=== Eggs ===
Marpesia butterflies lay individual eggs on the leaves of trees and shrubs in the family Moraceae, which include shrubs of the genus Ficus and Brosimum alicastrum. The eggs are white or yellowish.

=== Larva ===
Development to the larval stage can be variant in Marpesia species, especially in M. berania. If the following season post-egg laying is rainy or has subsequent heavy rains, this can influence the growth rate and development of the butterfly. Heavy rain is known to kill early larvae, which are highly susceptible to drowning and molding. If the M. berania larvae survives the harsh conditions, they grow to full size within 6–8 days, developing a colorful pattern marked with a yellow body with blue-green stripes running longitudinally from head to tail. The head of the larvae has two prong-like antennas that protrude vertically from the head, giving it the appearance of horns. The larvae feed during the day and then spend their nights resting on the tops of leaves. Pupae are pale, with dark spots or blotches.

=== Adult ===
The longevity of M. berania is exceptional compared to other tropical butterflies. It was found that 9.0% of 43.9 surviving marked butterflies were found living after 157 days. This is in comparison to two species of Heliconius, Heliconius erato and Heliconius erato hydrara. H. erato was found to live an average 3.5 months when curated in insectaries, and 100 days for H. erato hydrara when observed in the natural population in Trinidad.

== Habitat ==
M. berania is found in tropical rain forests and along waterways and roads in the lowlands of Central America. They can be found most commonly at elevations below 1000 meters, but have been found in locations up to 1800 meters above sea level. Typically, M. berania is seen during the wet seasons of Central and South America, from early March to mid-August. As elaborated on in the Life ecology section, the amber daggerwing roosts in clumps of leaves found on small trees. The trees they make their homes in can usually be found on riverbanks, in clearings, and other semi-open areas.

Marpesia berania is highly impacted by habitat loss, fragmentation, and degradation from anthropogenic causes. Since the rainforest is one of their habitats, this species is affected by deforestation in the region.

== Life ecology ==
=== Group behavior ===
Marpesia berania exhibit a behavior called communal or group roosting. These butterflies have been recorded to have a typical nocturnal roosting site on the underside of the leaves of rubiaceous trees or other small trees. Group roosts can include up to 60 individuals, and have equal numbers of male and female individuals. Interestingly, while roosts are nocturnal, female M. berania return earlier in the day than their male counterparts. This behavior puts them in the middle of the roosting site, progressively surrounded by males upon their return.

M. berania is one of the few butterfly species that sleep together in groups on leaves. This is for protection and to escape any potential dangers as a group. If one butterfly has been disturbed, it will respond by opening its wings, touching its neighbors' wings, creating a domino effect to alert others of the potential danger. Another behavior that is noted is when the temperatures are too high, they will reposition in a way to minimize the surface area of exposure to the sun.

=== Adult behavior and reproduction ===
Marpesia berania males engage in mud-puddling and are observed singly or in small groups of up to six at riverbanks or puddles, consuming moisture. The females rarely leave the forest. A common behavior observed only at high temperatures for both males and females is that they will erect their wings when feeding or are at rest on foliage, but M. berania typically bask in the sun or in open space with their wings outspread.

Both sexes have been shown to have equal life expectancy and reproduction so that next generations can be alleviated or remain unaffected by abiotic factors via recruitment. As both sexes have equal life expectancy, the adult sex ratio of M. berania is 1:1. J. Merritt Emlen speculates that selection would reduce the butterflies' ability to reproduce with age. Successful reproduction and low young age mortality can result in greater longevity and more energy resourced towards increasing immediate reproductive output.

=== Mortality ===
Oviposited or larval mortality is not sourced at this time. Adult mortality is speculated to be caused by bird predation, considering the broad area covered by roosting groups. Since M. berania is known to have a high longevity, any senescence effect on mortality is not supported as both sexes have been studied to live out equally long life spans. They are also strong and evasive flyers, which may contribute to their ability to escape potential predation or attacks.

== Morphology ==
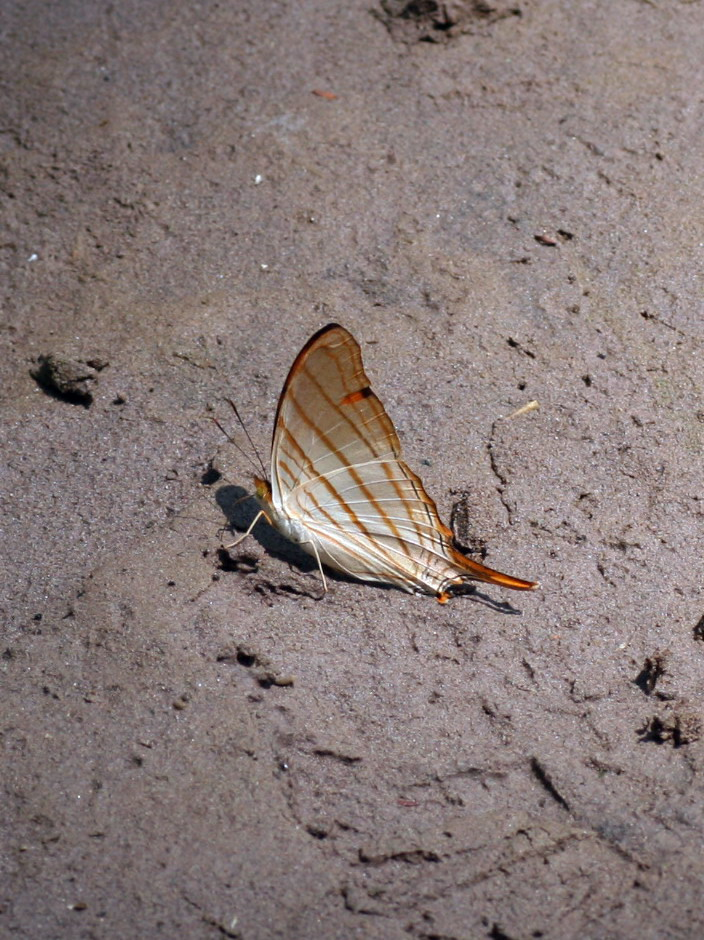
Male Marpesia berania, in Rio Pindayo, Peru

Marpesia berania can be identified primarily by its wings. These butterflies are sexually dimorphic, meaning that males and females look different from each other. This difference is easiest to detect by looking at the surface of the butterfly's wings, as both sexes have a pearly underside color. Male M. berania butterflies are bright orange with vertical dark brown striping on the surface of their wings, while, female M. berania are less vibrant, appearing more of a brownish orange. Both sexes have a telltale drastic point at the bottom ends of their wings, lending to their designation as a daggerwing butterfly. The same point is also seen in other Marpesia species.

M. berania have similar wing shapes to swallowtails, mimicking the sharp wing structure present in both. The difference between the two species is that M. berania has four functional legs rather than six. Unlike most other butterflies, the front two legs of this species are curved inwards towards the body, which is a characteristic found in the family Nymphalidae. Another distinguishing feature is that the antennae on Marpesia species are straight instead of curved at the end like most Papilionoidea butterflies.

== Taxonomy ==
Two subspecies are also recognized:

- Marpesia berania berania (Hewitson, 1852) - found in Brazil and Ecuador
- Marpesia berania fruhstorferi (Seitz, 1914) - found from the Honduras to Panama

== See also ==
- List of Lepidoptera of Honduras
- List of Marpesia (butterflies)
