= Architecture of Costa Rica =

The architecture of Costa Rica includes remains from the pre-Columbian Era, all the way to modern buildings that form part of the nation's contemporary infrastructure. The nation encompasses an array of historical buildings from both the pre-colonial era and post-colonial era, such as Guayabo and the Basilica of Our Lady of the Angels. The contemporary architectural scene in Costa Rica has also captured global attention, exemplified by structures such as Casa Flotanta. Architecture in Costa Rica is reflective of the nation's environmental conservation policies. This is reflected in the distinctive and extensive presence of canopy bridges throughout the nation, constructed in the aim of preventing rainforest destruction.

== Background ==
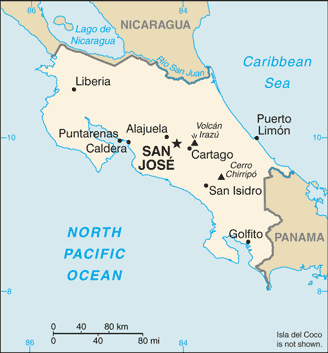
Map of Costa Rica.

Costa Rica is renowned for its vivacious culture which encompasses Indigenous practices, Spanish colonial influences, and various immigrant cultural customs. It is heavily influenced by the Spanish, due to the historic Spanish colonisation of the Americas in the 16th century.

== Historic sites in Costa Rica ==
Architecture in Costa Rica encompasses an array of historically rich buildings and structures. Minimal structures remain in Costa Rica from the pre-Columbian era, which is a large attraction of many other nations in Latin America. This is the result of early architecture in Costa Rica being constructed from wood, which has not withstood the years. Examples of pre-Columbian era constructions in Latin America include Machu Picchu and the Pyramid of the Sun. These were built by various ancient civilisations such as the Incas and Aztecs. Many prominent historical buildings in Costa Rica are instead from the Colonial era. Architecture from this era is very similar in style to Spanish architecture, due to the colonial rule and presence Spain exerted over the nation.

Prominent historical architectural sites in Costa Rica include Guayabo, Basílica de Nuestra Señora de los Ángeles and Las Ruinas de la Parroquia.

=== Guayabo ===
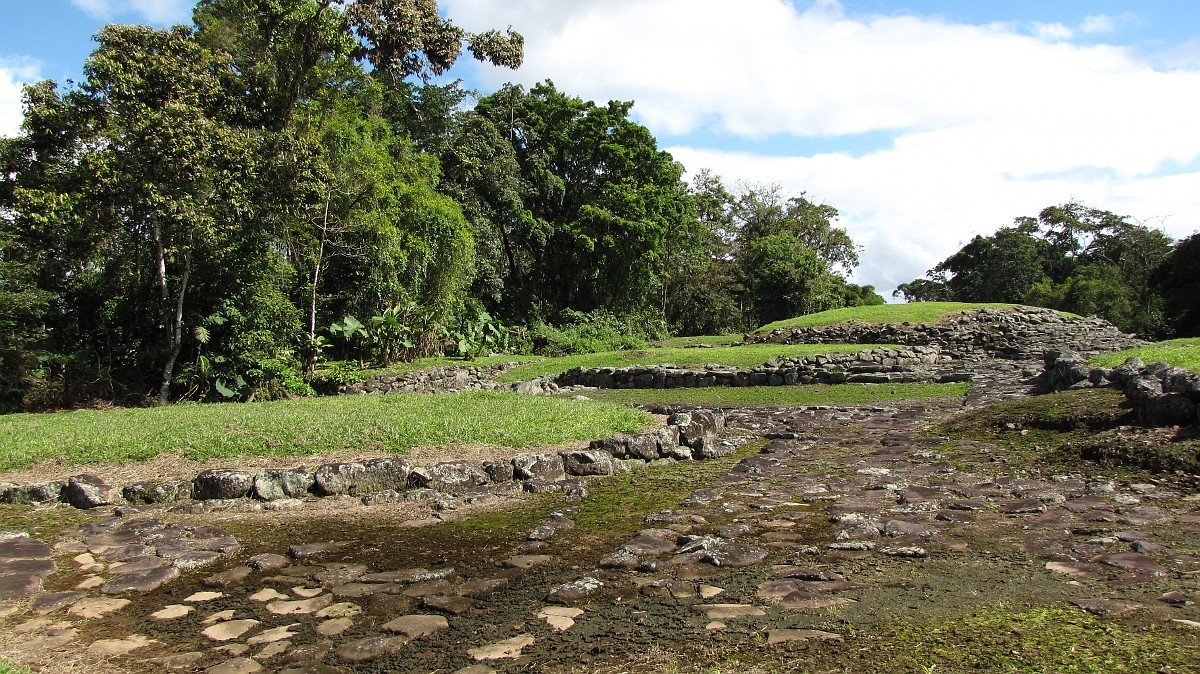
Guayabo de Turrialba ruins in the Cartago Province

The Guayabo de Turrialba is an archaeological site located in the Cartago Province of Costa Rica. The site is one of the few architectural remains of the pre-Columbian era in Costa Rica, and is the nation's largest ancient architectural site. Guayabo is assumed to have been a town or city, due to remains of stone paved streets, aqueducts, housing foundations, drawings of animals and stone carvings. The artefacts found in Guayabo date back to approximately 1000 BC, however it is still not confirmed as to why the site was abandoned by civilisation. A potential reason is the close proximity of Guayabo to the Turrialba Volcano. The area is also prone to high magnitude earthquakes, with the area being located at the centre of a series of intersecting fault lines. Furthermore, the location of Guayabo is very secluded, situated in the mountains of Guayabo national park. It can take up to an hour to travel there, requiring a car and hiking. In 1891, an excavation was conducted in a cemetery in Guayabo, with artefacts from the excavation being displayed at the Historical American Exposition at Madrid and then the World's Columbian Exposition in Madrid.

=== Basilica of Our Lady of the Angels, Cartago ===
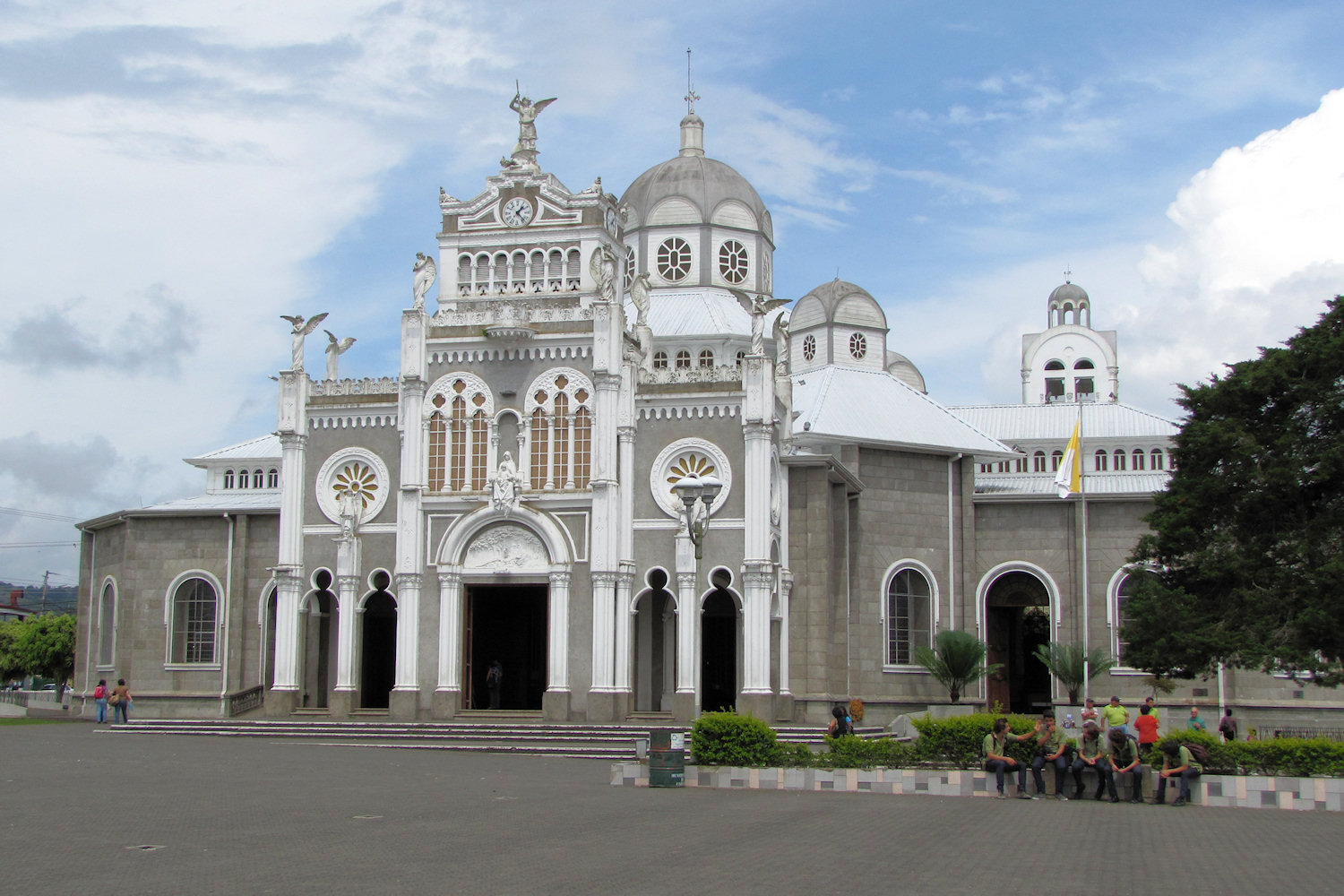
Exterior of the Basilica of Our Lady of the Angels

The Basílica de Nuestra Señora de los Ángeles translates to Our Lady of the Angels Basilica is a Roman Catholic basilica located in Cartago, built in the colonial era in 1639. It was restored and redesigned in 1939, following damages caused by a series of earthquakes that are very common in the Cartago area. The restoration was conducted by architect Luis Llach Llagos in the Byzantine style.

The basilica is devoted to the Virgen de los Ángeles who is known as la Negrita; the patron saint of Costa Rica. A pilgrimage occurs annually on the 2nd of August, with people from across Costa Rica complete a 22 km walk from San Jose to the basilica. The pilgrimage is known as the Romeria, and is a very significant and long held Costa Rican tradition.

=== Las Ruinas de la Paroquia ===
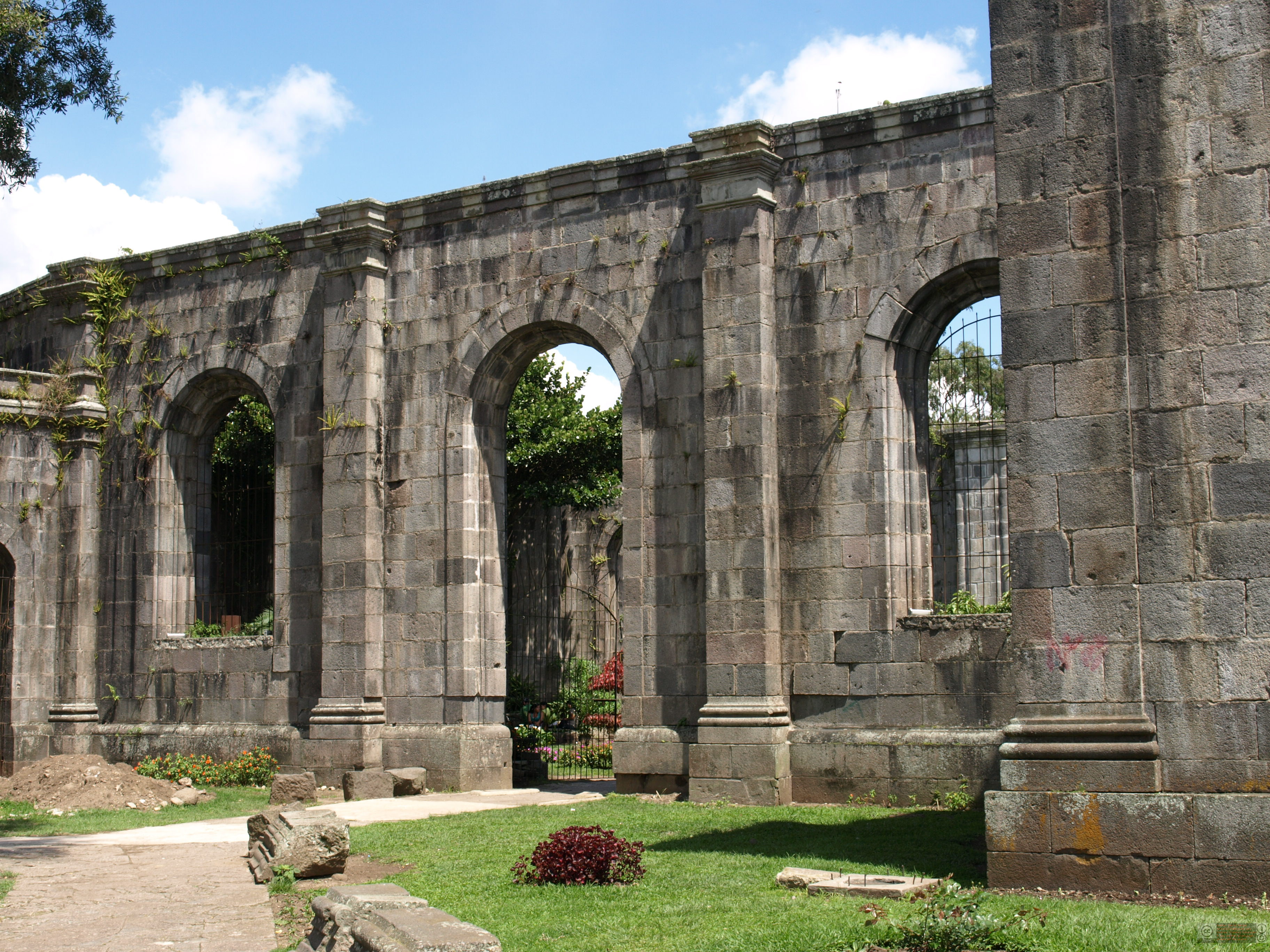
The Santiago Apóstol Parish Ruins

Las Ruinas de la Parroquia, or the Santiago Apóstol Parish Ruins, are a Costa Rican heritage site constructed in the colonial era in honour of the Roman Catholic Church. The ruins were once a Church, and the site is dedicated to St. James the Apostle. Multiple churches have been built on the site, as a result of reoccurring damage caused by earthquakes. Today only the outer walls of the last constructed church remain.

==== The legend of the Cartago ruins ====
Folktale exists around the establishment and construction of the Church, A popular story describes the fight of two brothers; a bitter priest and a single man, who fell in love with the same woman. The woman fell in love with the single man who was loved by all, making the priest resentful. In 1577, during the New Year's Eve mass, the priest killed his brother with a knife. As penance, he constructed the first church on the site. Locals and tour guides encourage the story that the headless ghost of the brother haunts the site to this day.

== Canopy bridges in Costa Rica ==
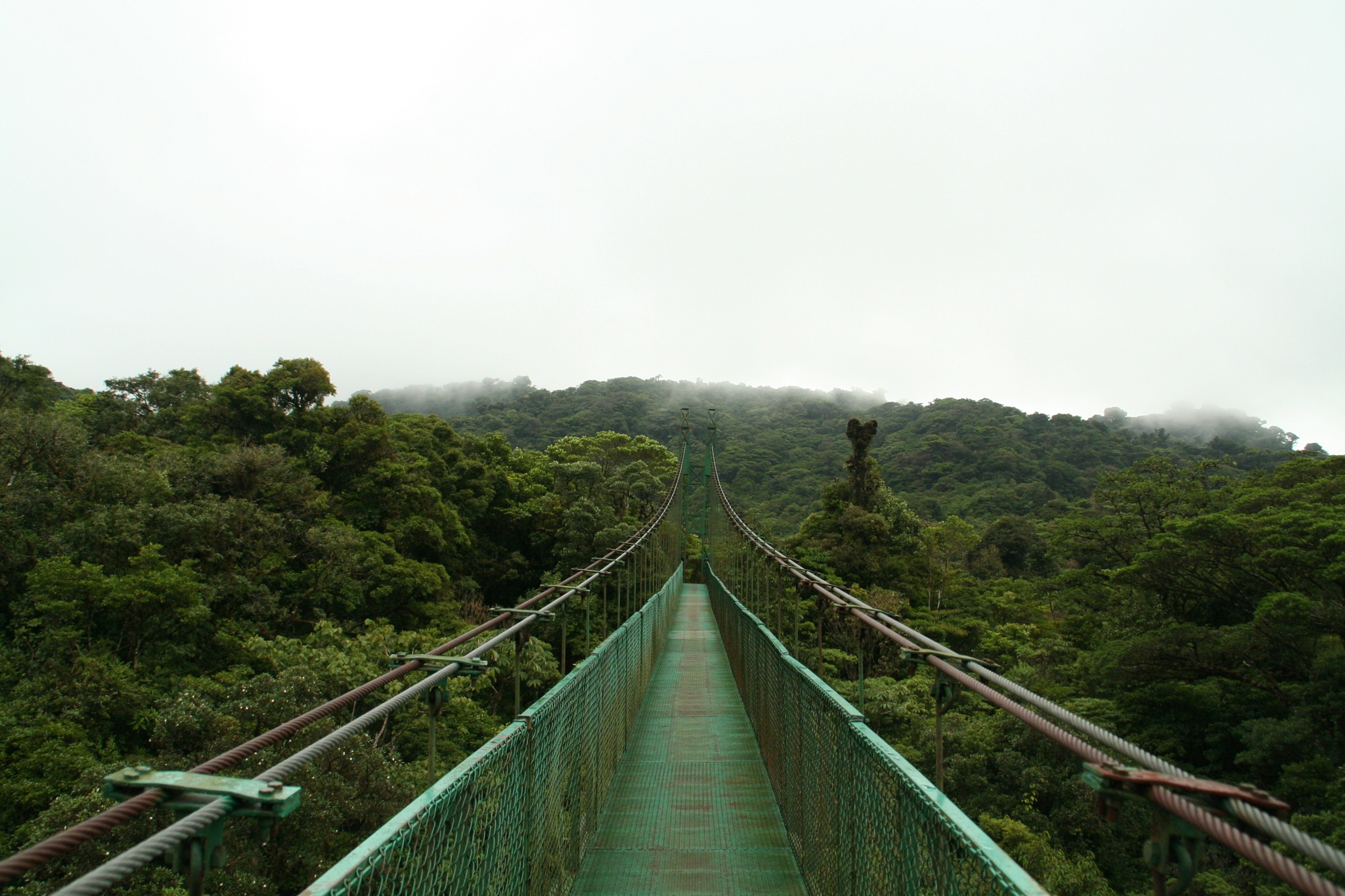
Canopy bridge in Costa Rica

Canopy bridges are a unique, but large part of Costa Rican architecture. They are a major part of the tourism industry, enabling people to experience the rainforests, which are an integral part of visiting Costa Rica, without damaging the habitat of the various flora and fauna. Furthermore, the canopy bridges generally span valleys, enabling fast access from one side of a gorge to another. Without these bridges, steep ascents and descents would be required. Thus, not only do the bridges aid in the preservation of Costa Rica's vast rainforests, they also make exploring these areas more efficient.

Canopy bridges are carefully engineered, with designers having to construct and install them, to have minimal impact on their surrounding environment. They are created from pre-fabricated materials to minimise damage to environmental site upon construction. Additionally, they are generally made from material such as metal that is strong enough to withstand the weather conditions of Costa Rica. Canopy bridges are also commonly used by animals, such as monkeys, as a means of transportation across steep gorges.

Many companies exist, offering guided tours of surrounding national park. These companies generally also offer other experiences, such as zip-lining and guided tours.

Examples of canopy bridges in Costa Rica
Company	Location
Mistico Arenal Hanging Bridges Park	La Fortuna de, Provincia de Alajuela
Selvatura Adventure Park	Puntarenas Province, Monteverde
Sky Adventures Monteverde Park	Provincia de Puntarenas, Monteverde Park
Sky Adventures Arenal Park	Provincia de Alajuela, La Fortuna
Monteverde Cloud Forest Biological Preserve	Provincia de Puntarenas, Monteverde
