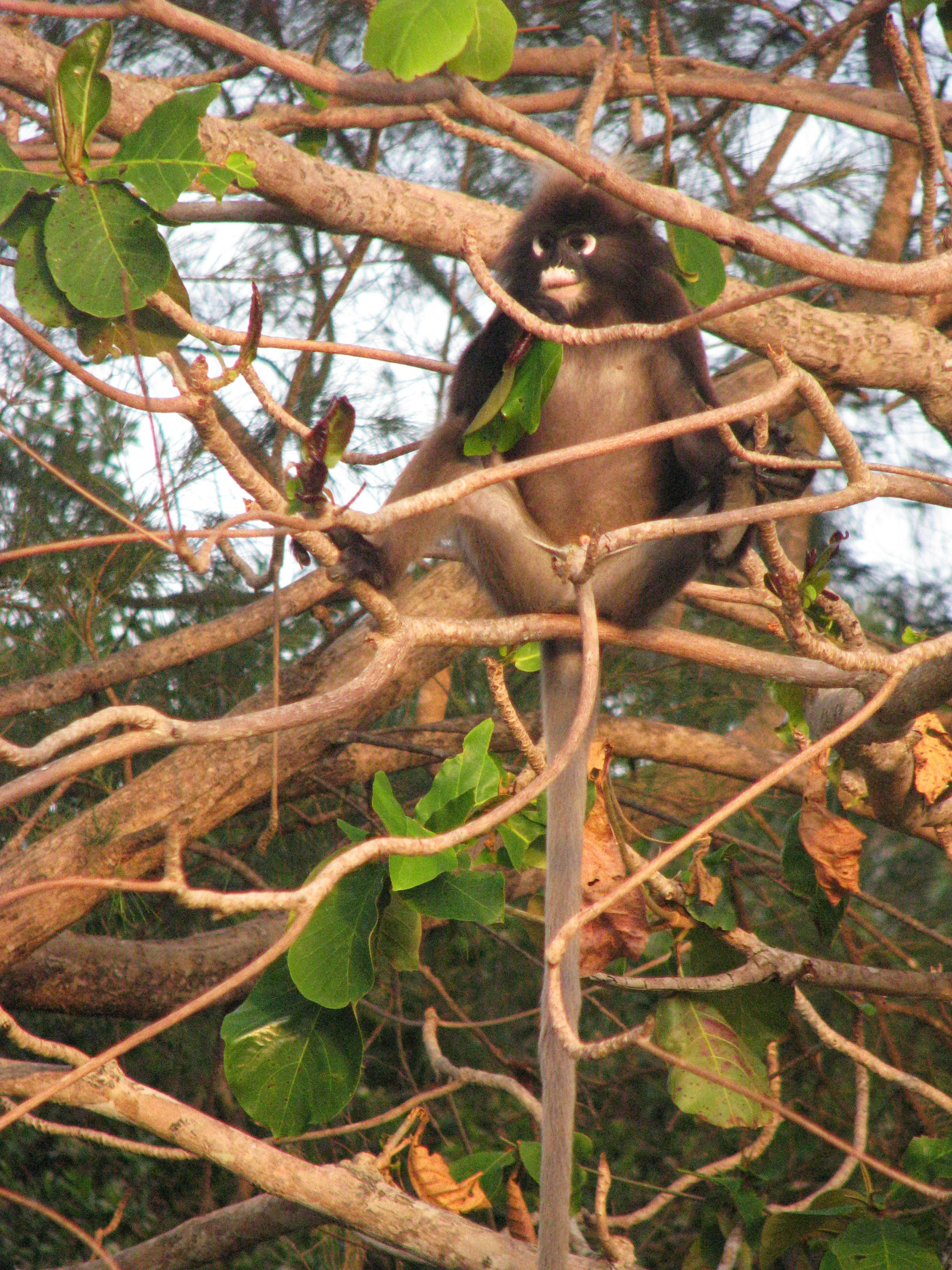

Conservation status
- Endangered (IUCN 3.1)

Scientific classification
- Kingdom: Animalia
- Phylum: Chordata
- Class: Mammalia
- Order: Primates
- Family: Cercopithecidae
- Genus: Trachypithecus
- Species group: Trachypithecus obscurus group
- Species: T. obscurus

Binomial name
- Trachypithecus obscurus (Reid, 1837)
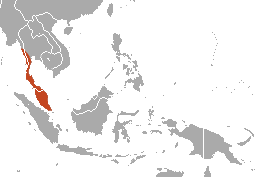
- Dusky leaf monkey range

= Dusky leaf monkey =

Species of Old World monkey

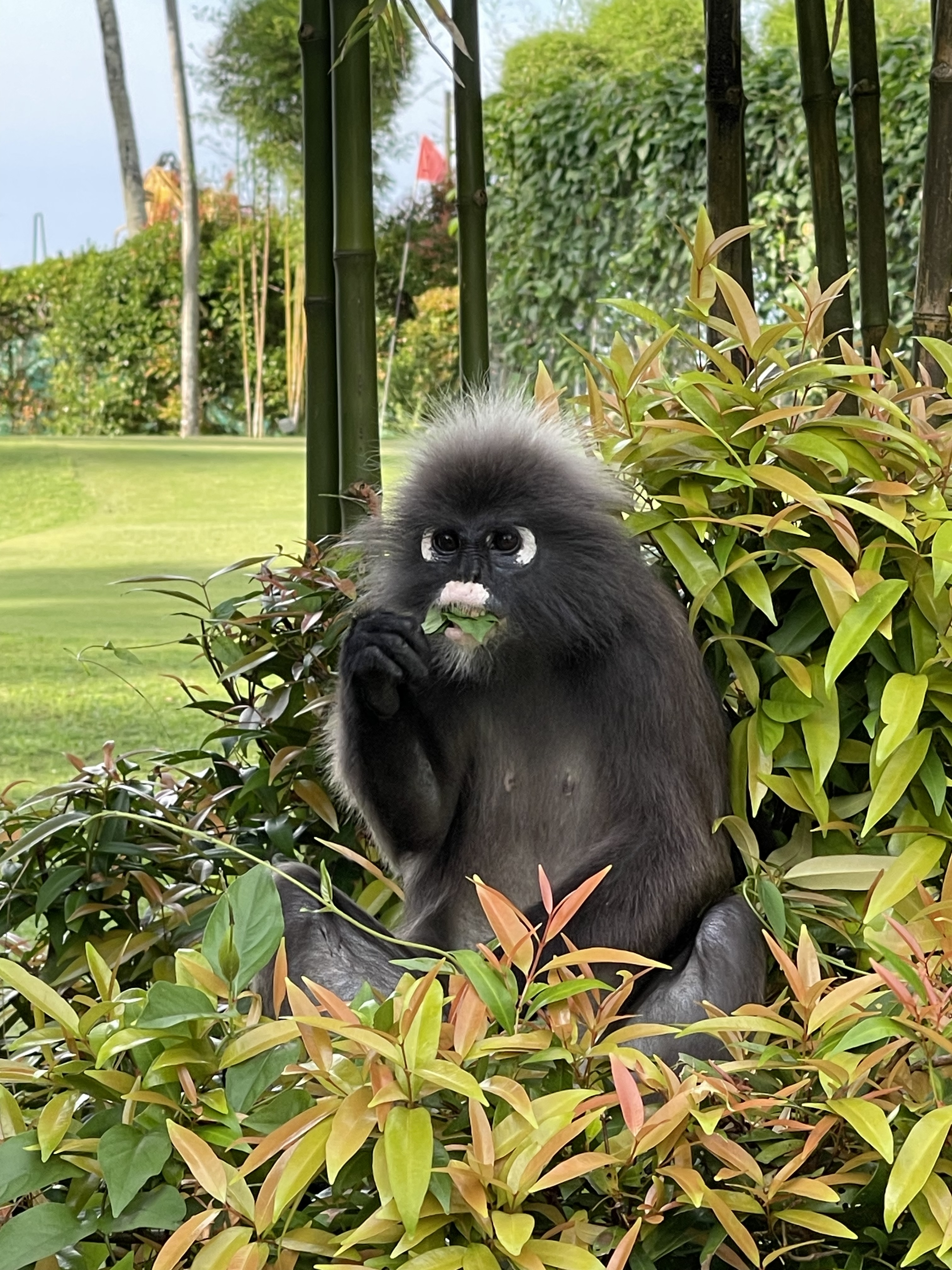
In Penang Malaysia

The dusky leaf monkey (Trachypithecus obscurus), also known as the spectacled langur or the spectacled leaf monkey, is a species of primate in the family Cercopithecidae. It is found in Peninsular Malaysia, Myanmar and Thailand, and can occasionally be found in Singapore. During the day, these small, folivorous primates divide in sub-groups and forage for vegetation and fruit throughout the tropical forests. According to the IUCN, the dusky leaf monkey's population is declining due to habitat loss, poaching, and anthropogenic land use, which prompted the IUCN to classify the species as endangered in 2015.

== Taxonomy ==
Within the Cercopithecidae family, the dusky leaf monkey is a member of the genus Trachypithecus. Although most researchers agree with this classification, others believe that this primate should be categorized under the genus Presbytis.

=== Subspecies ===
Researchers have also disputed the number of subspecies that exist, with some claiming that there are 11, while others claim there are seven. Currently, the following seven subspecies are officially recognized:

- T. o. obscurus
- T. o. flavicauda
- T. o. halonifer
- T. o. carbo
- T. o. styx
- T. o. seimundi
- T. o. sanctorum

== Description ==
The dusky leaf monkey can appear in different colour variations, depending on the sub-species. While dusky leaf monkeys are born with an orange coat, the colour of their fur changes as they mature into adulthood. Along the abdominal area, their fur is often several shades lighter than that of their dorsal area, which can develop in shades of brown, black, or grey. Surrounding their eyes are circular patterns of bright white fur.

The dusky leaf monkey is a rather small primate. In a study conducted by G. J Burton, the average weight of the 25 male dusky leaf monkeys that were sampled was 7.39 kilograms, while that of the 44 female dusky leaf monkeys that were sampled was 6.47 kilograms. These results suggest that dusky leaf monkeys are sexually dimorphic species, as the females were found to be, on average, 12% smaller than the males sampled. Burton's study also revealed that, among the 25 male primates, there was a direct correlation with the weight of one testicle with the weight of the other, suggesting that one testicle may be used to estimate the weight of the other. However, the female ovaries were found to not be statistically significant enough to predict the weight of one ovary with the other.

== Distribution ==
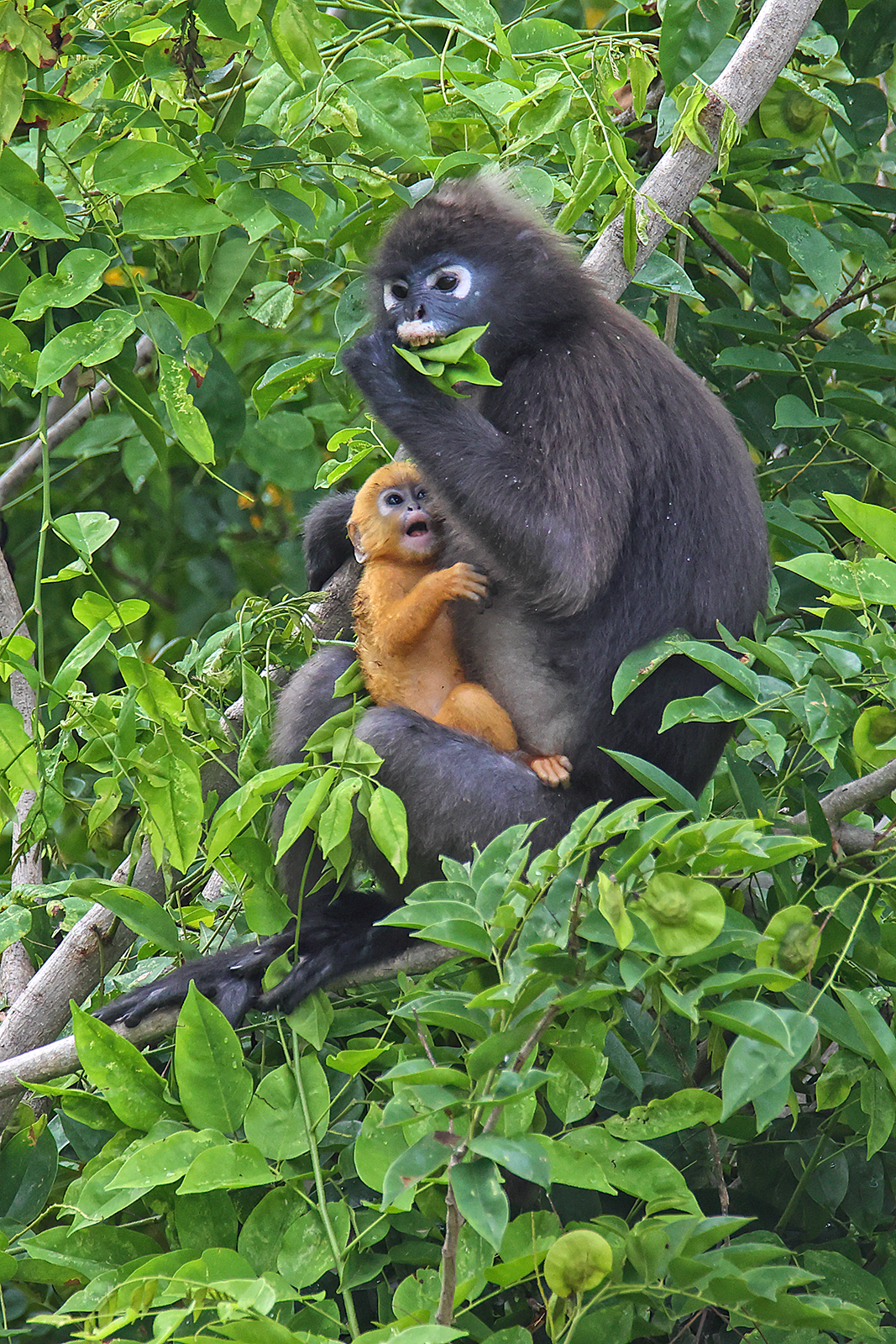
Young are born with an orange coat.

The dusky leaf monkey can be found across Malaysia, Myanmar, and Thailand, where they inhabit tropical forests.

=== Singapore population ===
However, these primates have occasionally been spotted in Singapore. Research conducted within the country between 2019 and 2020 revealed that three dusky leaf monkey individuals were located in August 2019 within the northern region of the island, near the body of water that borders Singapore and Malaysia. While dusky leaf monkeys are not considered native to the region, researchers speculate that they are able to swim to the country. Researchers are concerned about these migratory patterns because these primates can increase competition for resources, such as vegetation, and transfer diseases and pathogens to other native species that are not equipped to recover from them. In January 2020, a group of two dusky leaf monkeys, who possibly swum across Johor, was observed in Singapore, and they were able to chase away a group of eleven Raffles' banded langurs. Despite this, the species is not considered an invasive species, as their colonisation of Singapore is natural and not assisted by humans.

== Behaviour and diet ==
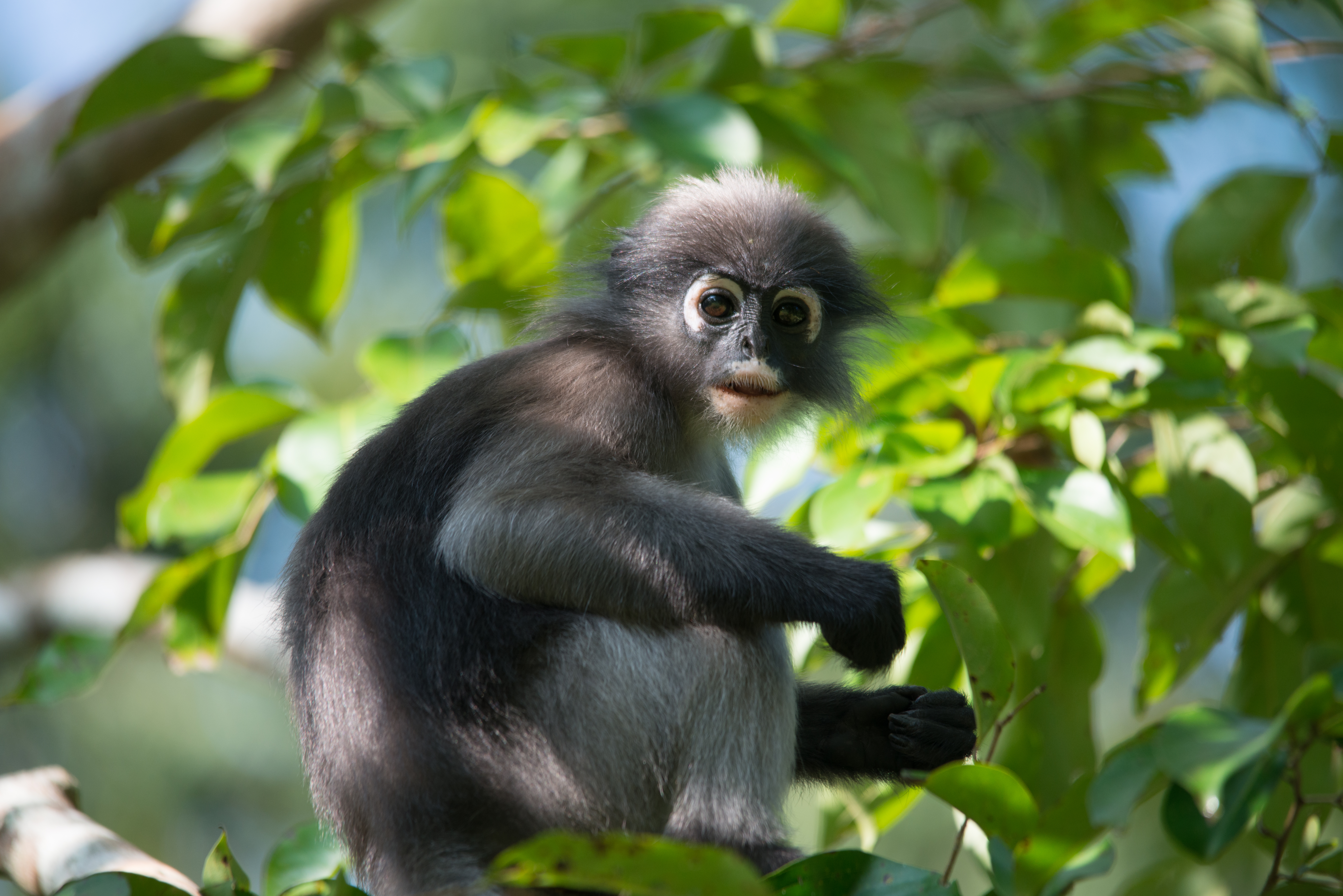
In the emergent and canopy layers

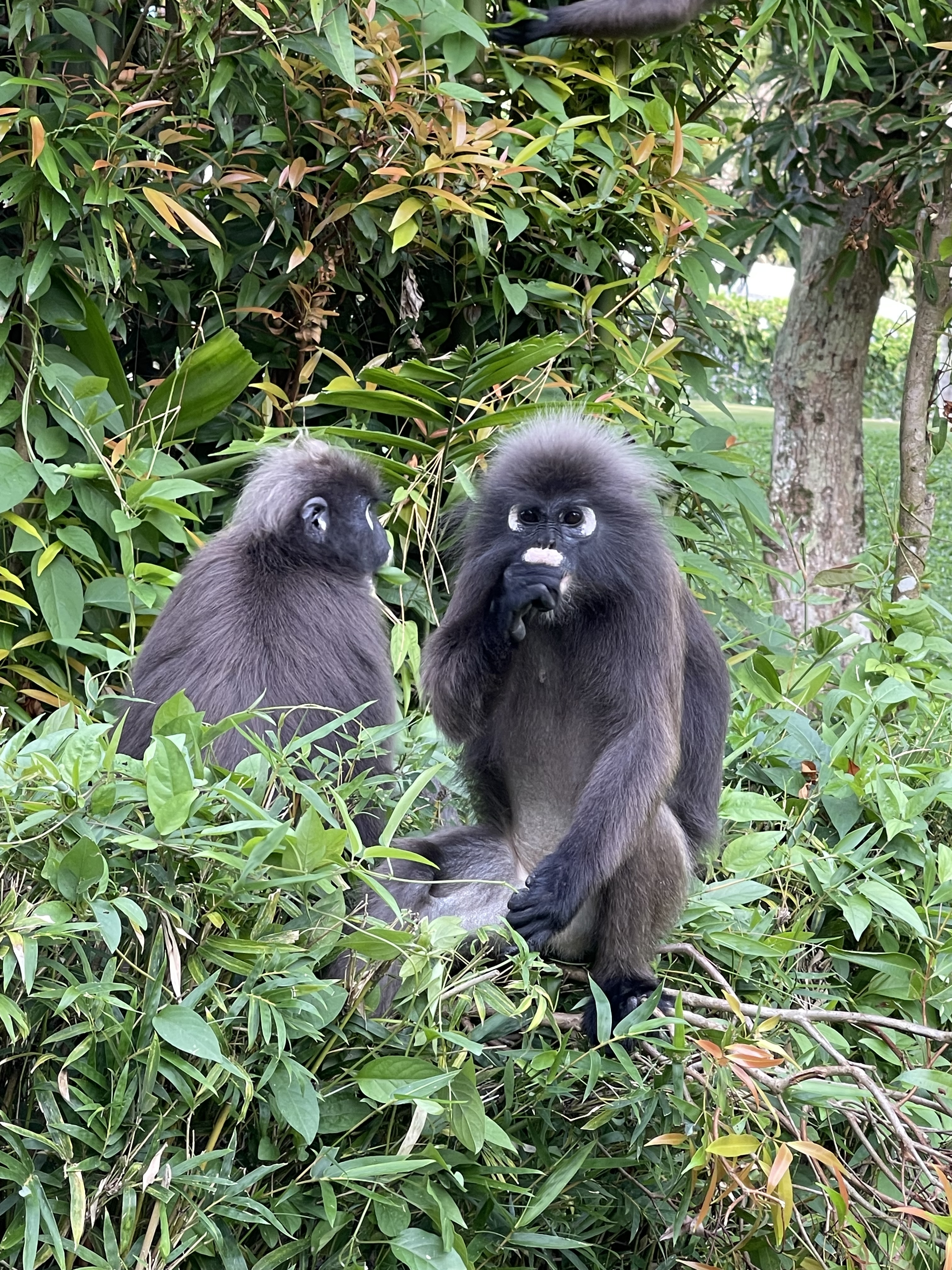
Eating in a group

Numerous activity budgets have been conducted across Malaysia to study the behavioural patterns of the dusky leaf monkey. For instance, one activity budget conducted in 2016 with 12,480 primates in Teluk Bahang, Malaysia, found that, within the eight-month period, dusky leaf monkeys spent 40% of their time positioning, 33% of their time feeding, and 20% of their day moving. The sampled primates also allocated their time allo-grooming (4%), playing (2%), and foraging (1%). Ten years prior, another activity budget with 18 dusky leaf monkeys was conducted at the Penang Botanical Garden, which is also located in Malaysia. Researchers at the National University of Malaysia concluded that, within 18 days, the dusky leaf monkeys that were sampled spent 40% of their day eating, almost 24% of their day resting, and approximately 22.5% of their time moving. The dusky leaf monkeys also allocated time for autogrooming (6.52%) and allo-grooming (1.33%), among other behaviours. However, a more recent study conducted in Malaysia from November 2017 to February 2018 in Bukit Soga Perdana, a forested area that is heavily influenced by industrial activity, concluded that the dusky leaf monkeys sampled spent the majority of their days moving, although these results were skewed due to unfavourable weather conditions that occurred during observations.

Dusky leaf monkeys live in troops that separate into sub-groups while scavenging for food. They tend to consume leaves growing at higher elevations in the forest canopy. They often rest at these high elevations to feed on their foraged vegetation. Fruit availability is season-dependent, and although research suggests that the dusky leaf monkey consumes more vegetation than fruit, it prefers to eat fruit when it is available.

Research suggests that hostile behaviour within troops does not occur often. A study conducted in 1996 by researchers at the University of St. Andrews revealed that, after a group of dusky leaf monkeys engage in aggressive behaviour, conflict resolution occurs more frequently and much faster afterwards than within other primate species. In fact, reconciliation among dusky leaf monkeys can occur as quickly as 60 seconds after fighting, and can be instigated by either the aggressor or the receiver through gestures such as embracing.

=== Mating ===
In another study conducted by Burton, 44 male dusky leaf-monkeys were sampled and the seminiferous tubules within each gonadal were observed. Burton concluded that the seminiferous tubules within each gonadal remained the same size throughout the year, and that there was no evidence of seasonal variation in testicular weight. This reveals that the male dusky leaf monkey does not have a seasonal mating period and are able to reproduce throughout the year. Burton suggests that this may be the case due to the continuous, warm climates experienced within Southeast Asia, as the mating period for many seasonal breeders occurs during warming climates.

== Conservation ==
As of 2015, the dusky leaf monkey is listed as an endangered species in the IUCN Red List. Notably, anthropogenic land-use within Southeast Asian forests have resulted in the endangerment of the dusky leaf monkey's natural habitat, resulting in noticeable population declines. However, the dusky leaf monkey also faces other threats brought on through anthropogenic activities and the introduction of predators within their habitat. Notably, domesticated dog packs have been reported to hunt and kill the dusky leaf monkey. The construction of roads within tropical forests has led to a large increase in road mortality among dusky leaf monkeys, and is seen to be one of the more prominent threats to the dusky leafy monkey's survival, along with habitat loss, habitat degradation, and poaching. While the dusky leaf monkey is often killed for their meat, there are other incentives to poach them as well, as they are considered agricultural pests across Southeast Asia. In the 1960s, this prompted Malaysian business owners to shoot them as they were feeding on leaves within rubber plantations. Infant dusky leaf monkeys are also hunted and sold as pets internationally. However, when owners attempt to domesticate these primates, they are often not properly cared for and die as a result. Adults are also abandoned, having lost their cuter orange fur and baby-like features.

Collective action is being taken to help conserve the dusky leaf monkey. In 1977, the dusky leaf-monkey had been introduced and listed under appendix II in the CITES legislation. Species under appendix II are considered to be near threatened or endangered. The trade of appendix II species is heavily regulated, and often illegal.

In Malaysia, wildlife trading laws criminalise possession, but not sale, creating a loophole for online sellers to connect with third-party suppliers. Canopy bridges are being tested in Penang to see if they will reduce road kill.

== Gallery ==
In Kaeng Krachan National Park

Calling in Kaeng Krachan National Park.

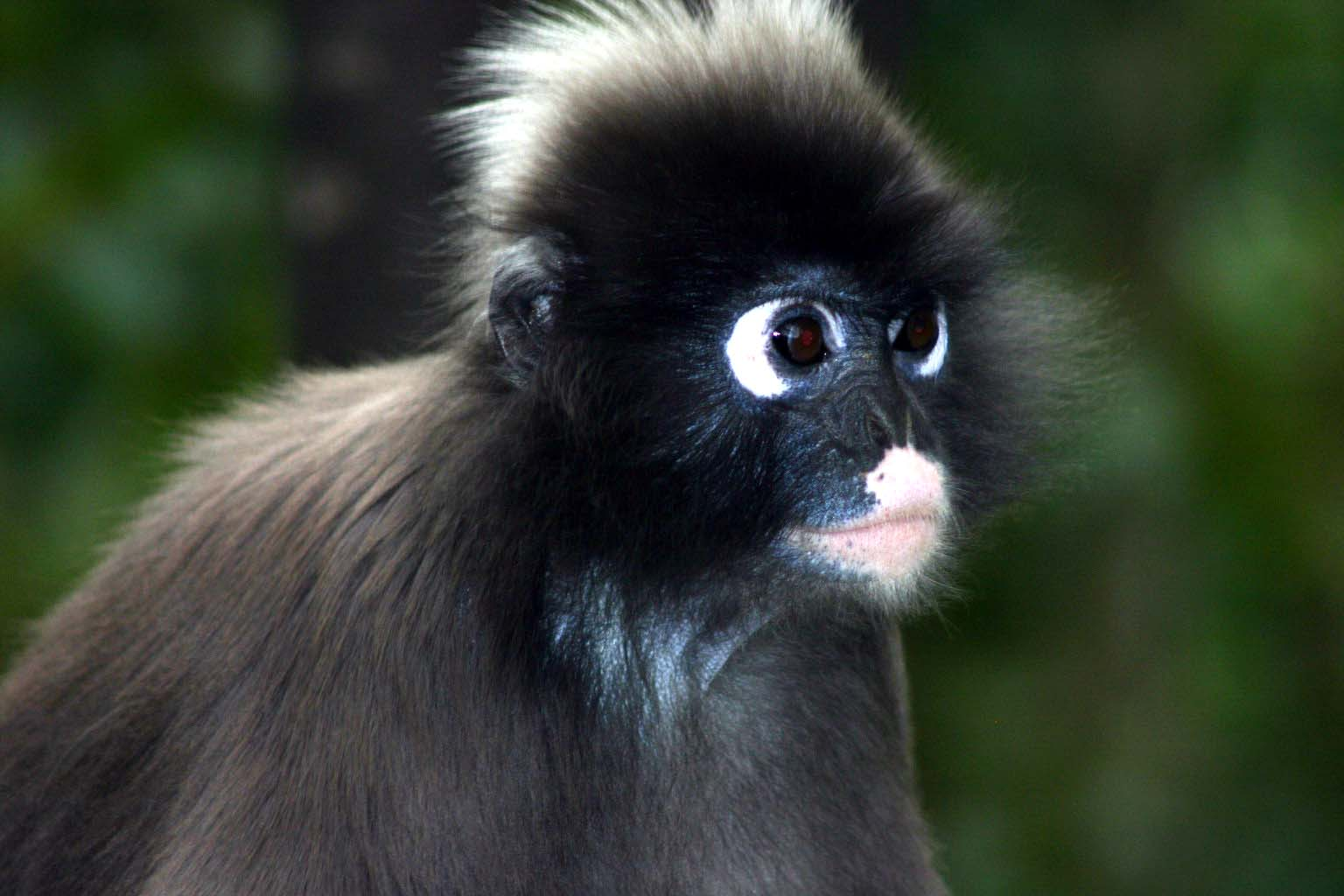
Adult male

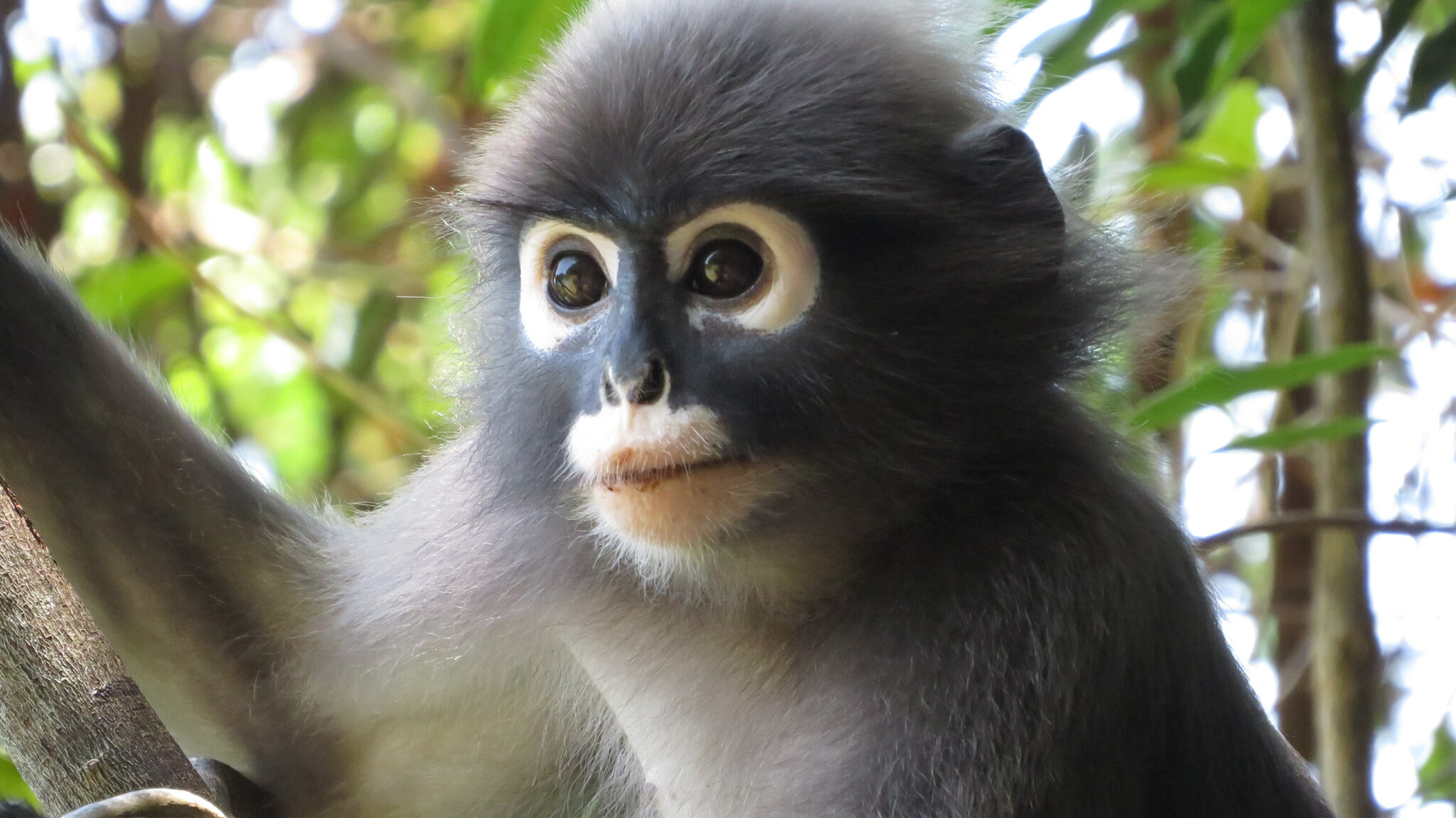
Close-up of face

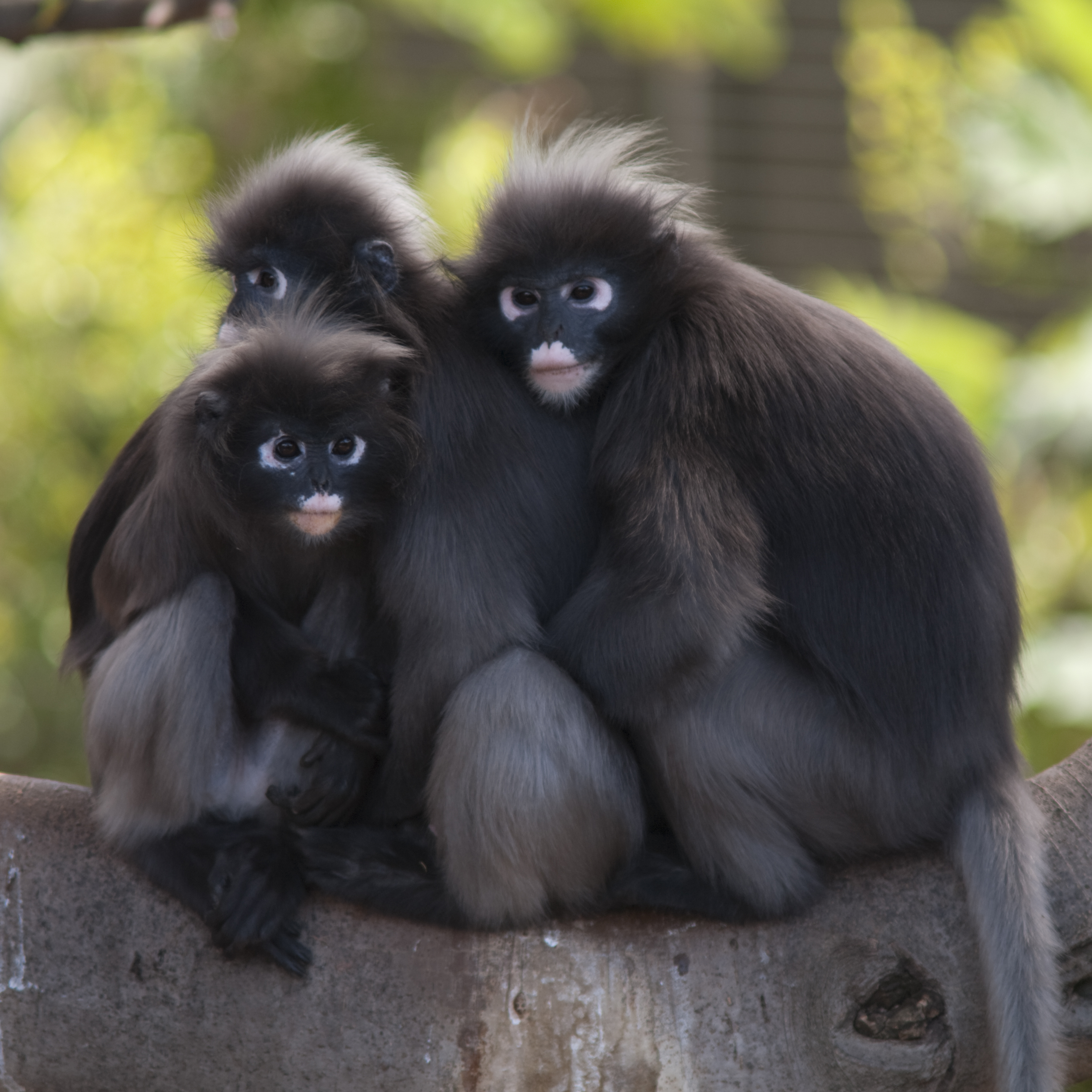
at Adelaide Zoo.
