= James the Apostle =

James the Apostle may refer to:

- James the Great (James, the son of Zebedee) one of the twelve apostles of Jesus
- James, son of Alphaeus, one of the twelve apostles of Jesus
- James, brother of Jesus (James the Just), not one of the twelve, traditionally considered the author of the Epistle of James

== See also ==
- James the Less, who may or may not be the same person as James the brother of Jesus or James, son of Alphaeus
