= Santiago Apóstol Parish Ruins =

Ruinas de la Parroquia de Santiago Apóstol
- St. James the Apostle Parish Ruins
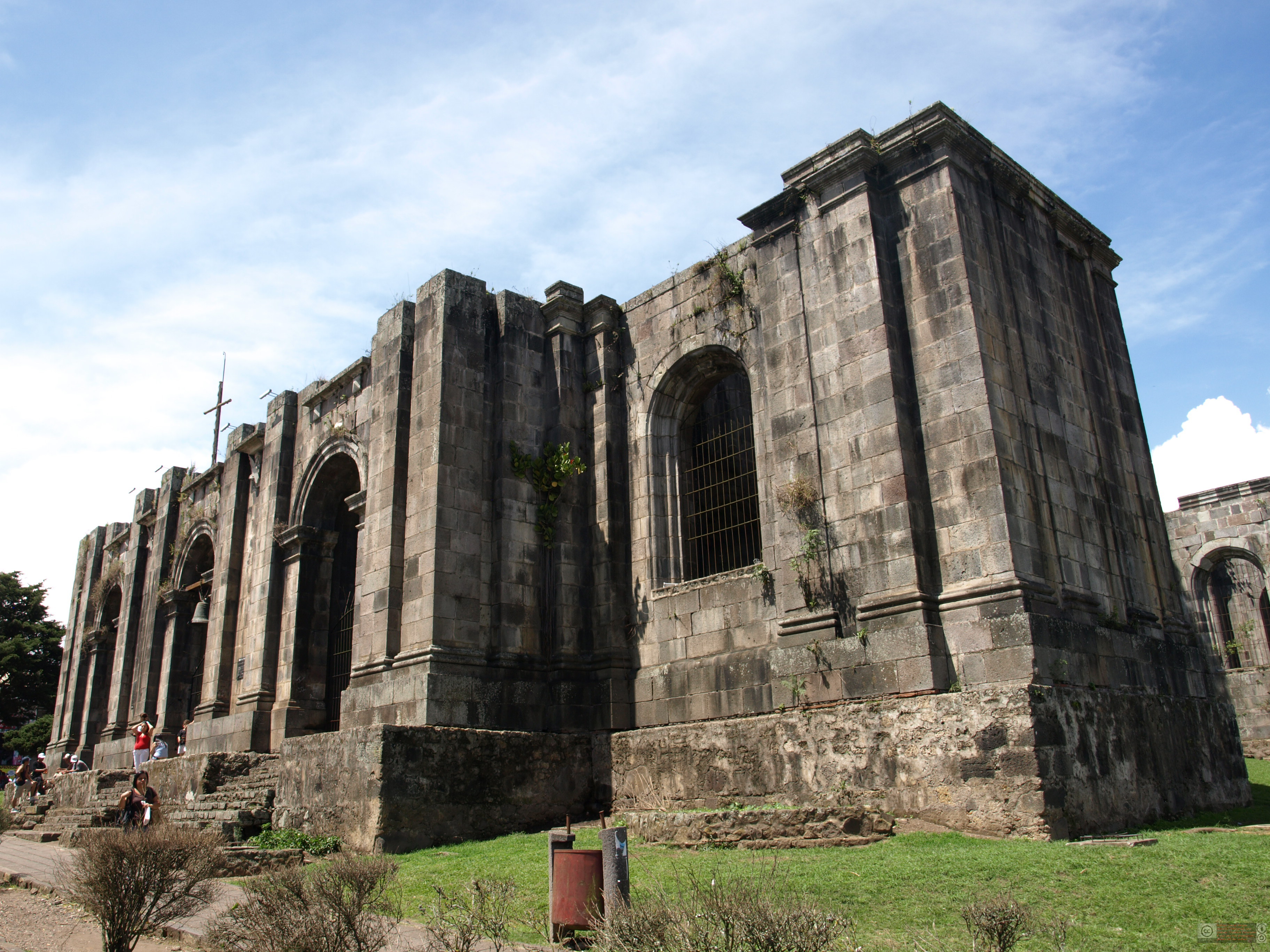
- Location: Cartago City
- Country: Costa Rica
- Denomination: Roman Catholic

History
- Status: In ruins
- Dedication: St. James the Apostle

Architecture
- Heritage designation: Costa Rican Heritage Site
- Architect: Francisco Kurtz
- Architectural type: Romanesque
- Groundbreaking: 1870
- Completed: Never (halted in 1910)

Administration
- Diocese: Cartago

Santiago Apóstol (St. James Apostle) Parish Ruins is a Costa Rican Cultural Heritage Site, located in the city of Cartago, Costa Rica.

== History ==
Several churches have existed on this site since 1575. The first building was damaged in 1630 by an earthquake, and was demolished in 1656, when a new one began to be built, which was finished and consecrated in 1662. This second structure had two chapels, one used for praying and the other one for funerals, and both were safeguarded by the local townspeople. In 1718 the then old and deteriorated church was heavily damaged by another earthquake, leading to repairs. In 1756 another earthquake damaged the church, forcing further repairs. It was finally destroyed on September 2, 1841, by the San Antolín earthquake. In 1870 the last attempt to rebuild the church was started. The new parish was built and designed by engineer Luis Llach and German architect Francisco Kurtz, respectively, and had a Romanesque style, the only one found in Costa Rica. Its construction was halted for thirty years, and was restarted again in 1903 or 1904, before being completely canceled in 1910, after the Santa Mónica earthquake. They are not ruins in the strictest sense, since the church was never actually completed. Today it is a tourist destination, used as a public park, with occasional masses.

It was declared a "Historic Relic" in the presidential decree Nº 13799-C, published in the official country's gazette (La Gaceta) Nº 163 on August 25, 1982.

== Costa Rican folklore ==
According to a popular legend, there were two brothers who lived in colonial Cartago city. One of them was a single, nice and loved person and the other a priest. A rivalry arose between them as both fell in love with the same woman, who chose and married the lazy brother. The priest was infuriated, and did everything he could to destroy his brother. Then, in 1577 during the New Year's mass, he saw his brother in the church and killed him with a knife. In penance for his mortal sin he built a church for the city, but one year afterwards an earthquake destroyed it. Each time it was rebuilt, another new earthquake destroyed it, until 1910 when it was canceled and thought to be a cursed site. It is also said that in foggy nights, it is possible to see the priest, headless, inside the ruins, wandering for eternity as his penance for desecrating a holy site.

== Gallery ==
Several views of the ruins, seen from the inside and the outside of the complex.

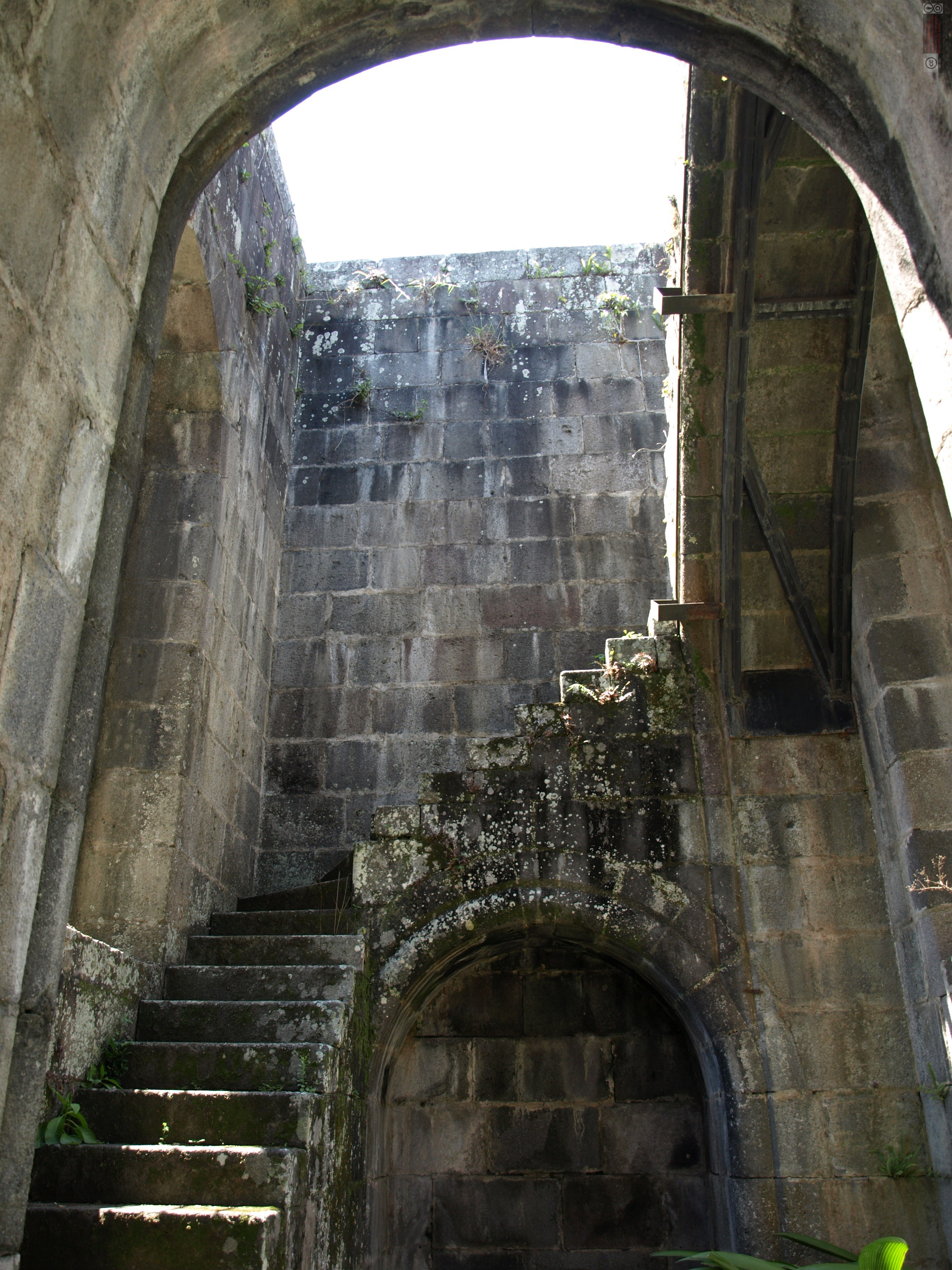

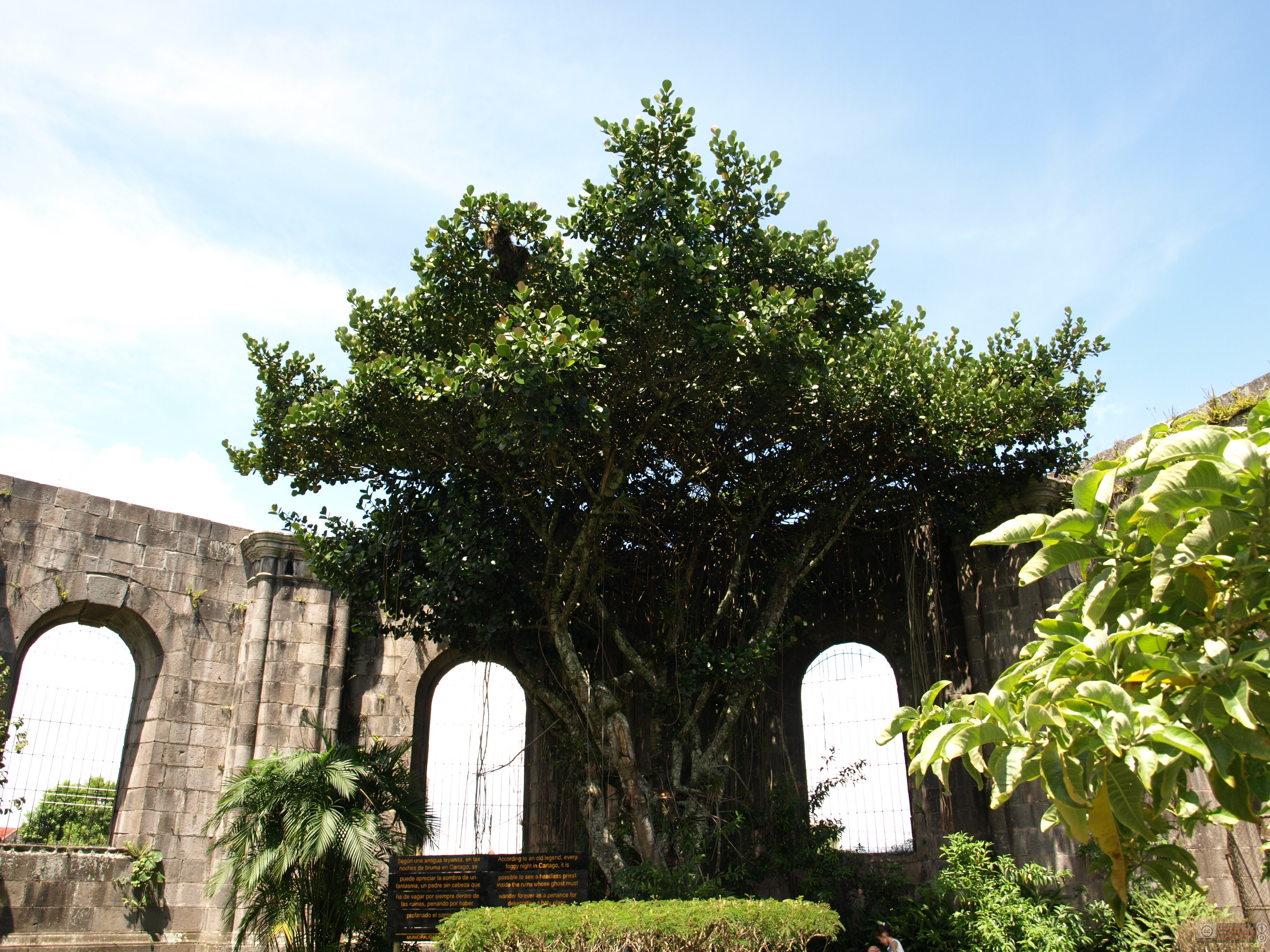

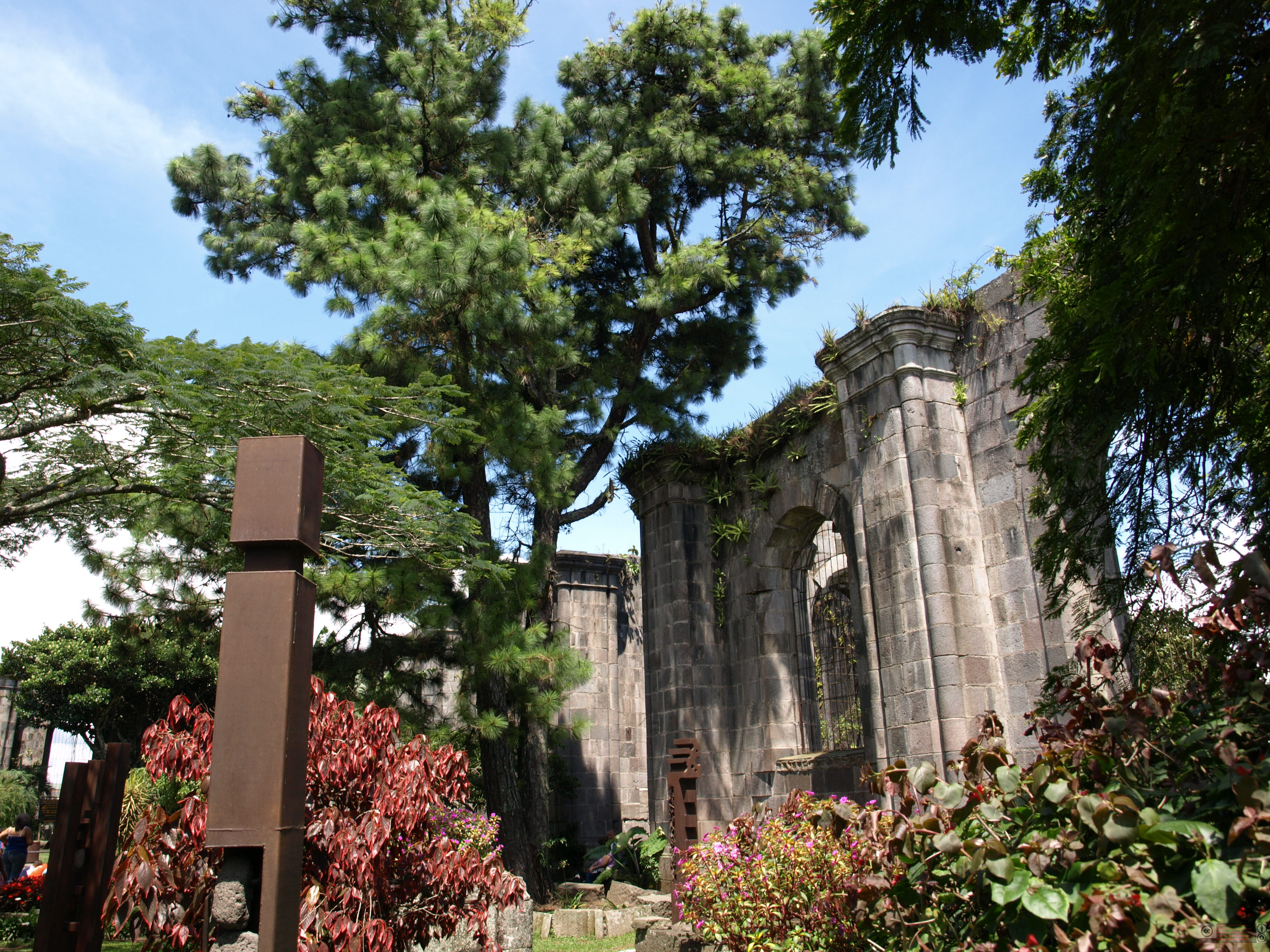

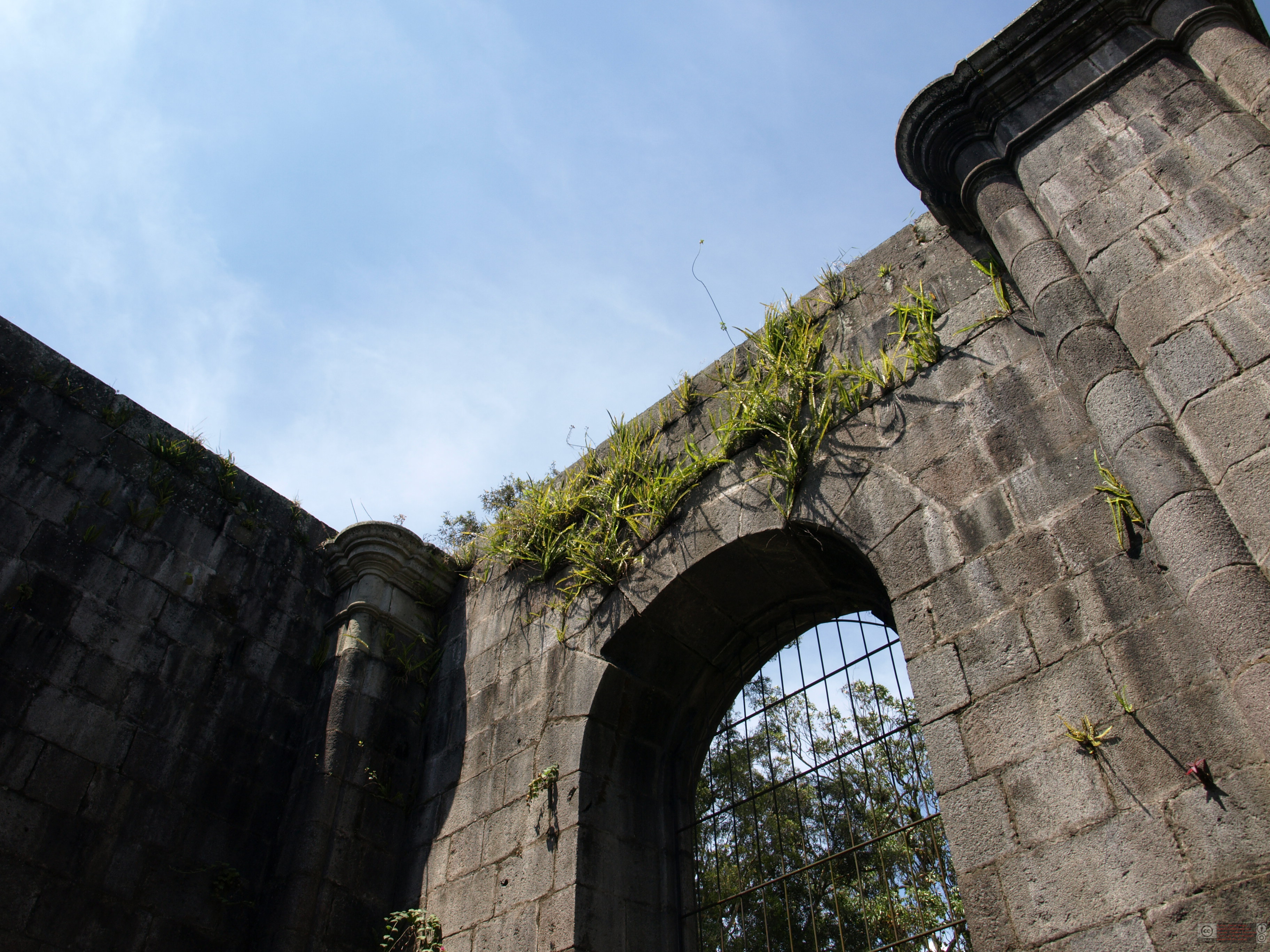

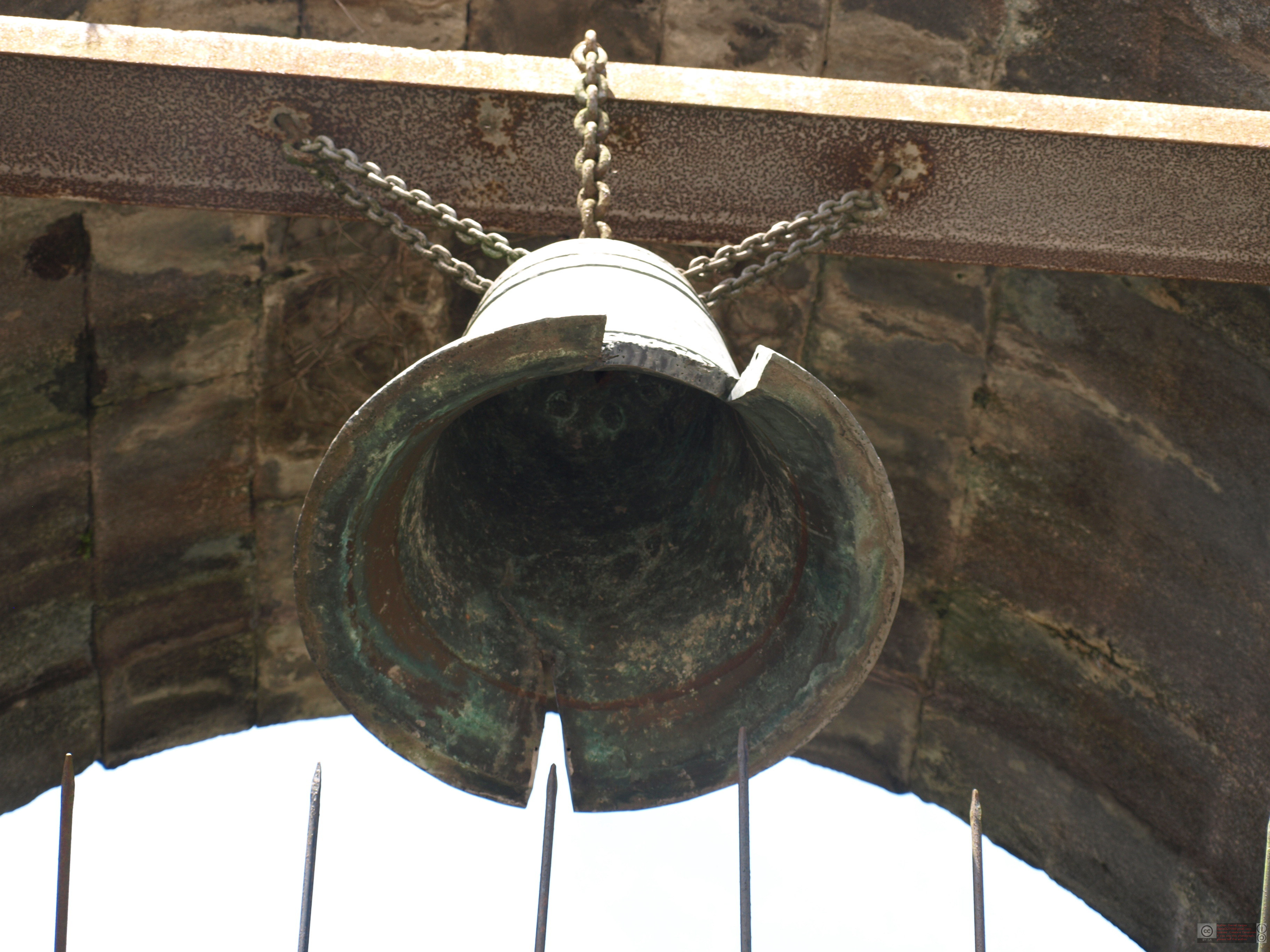

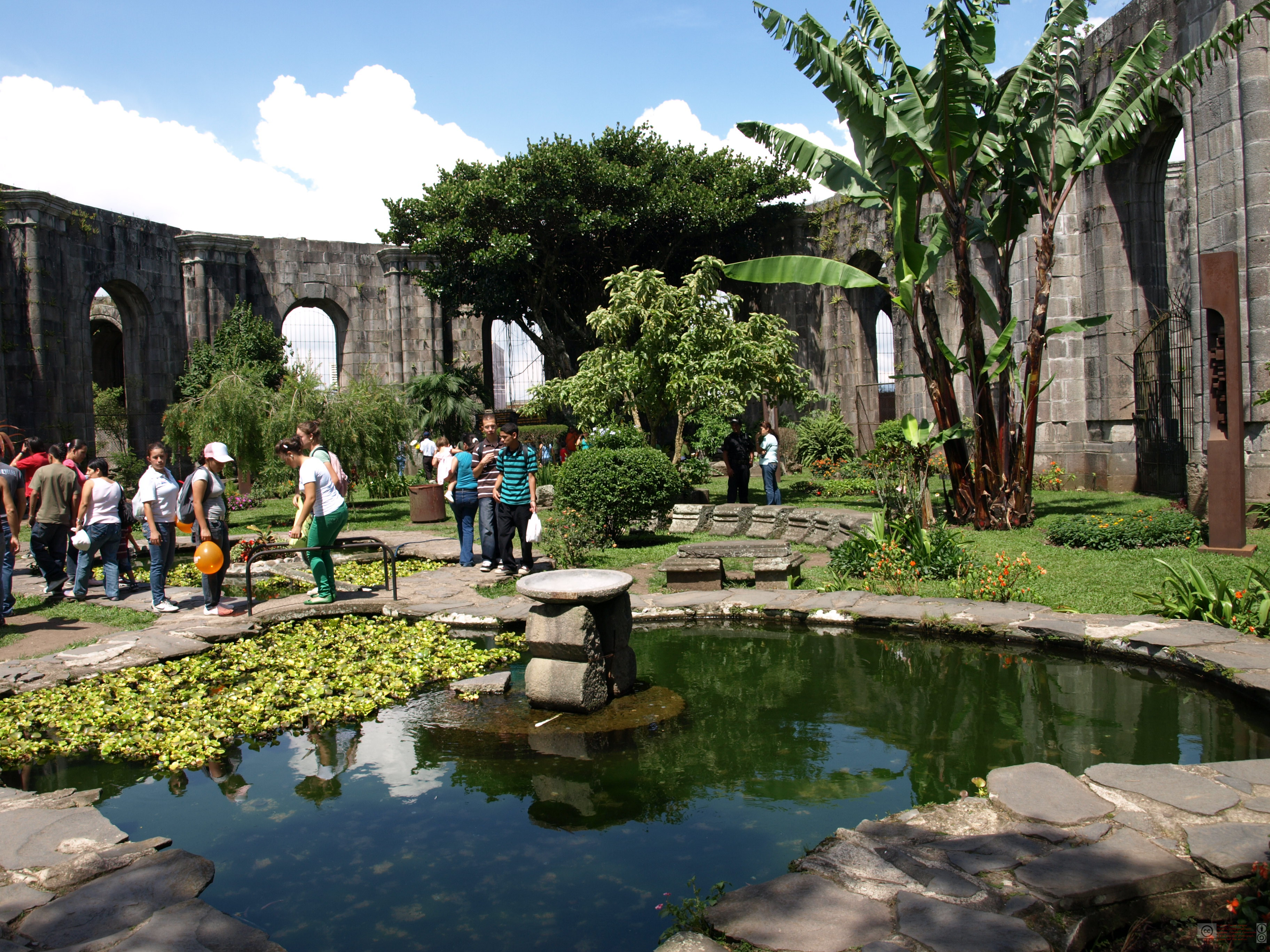

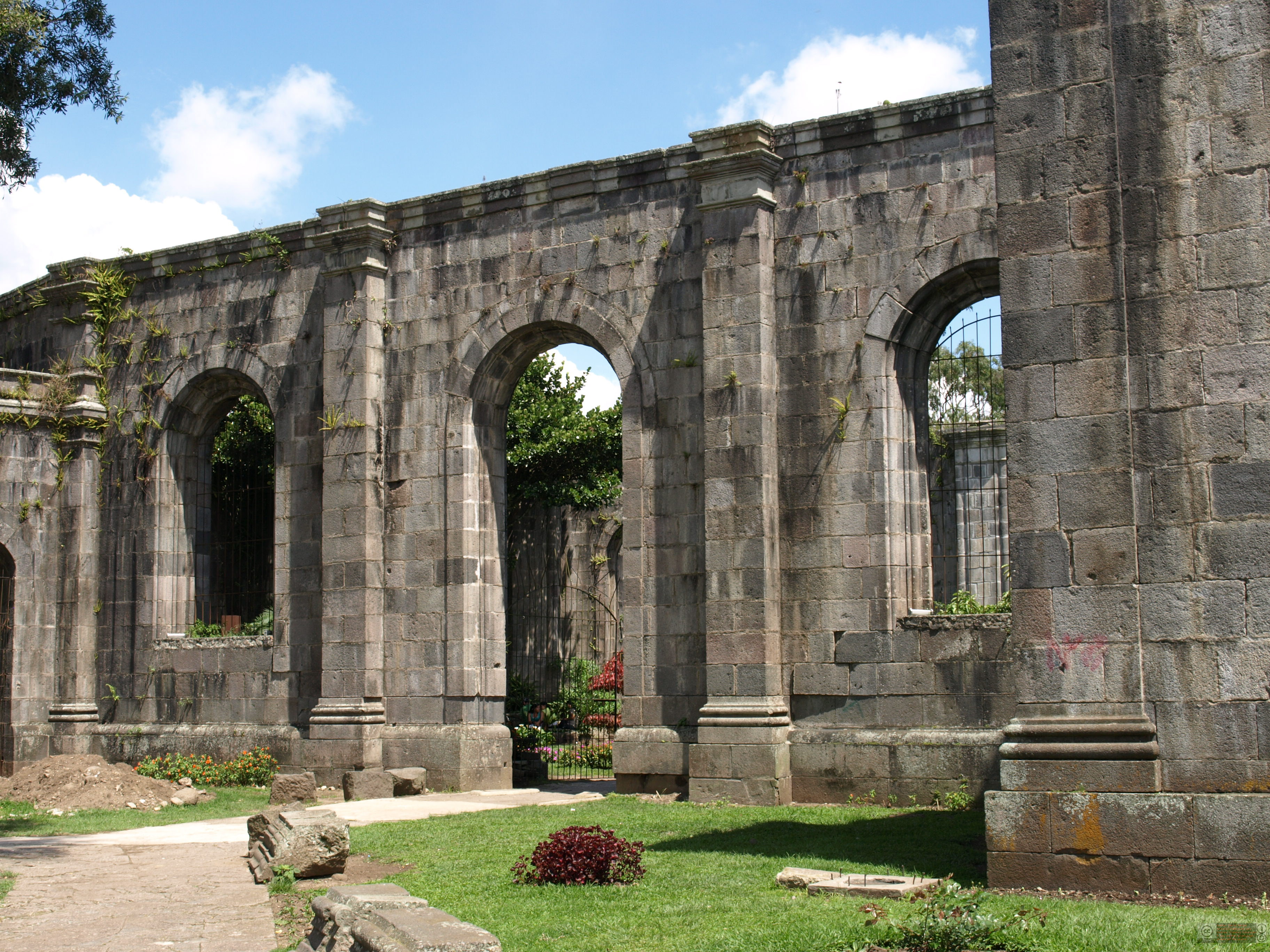

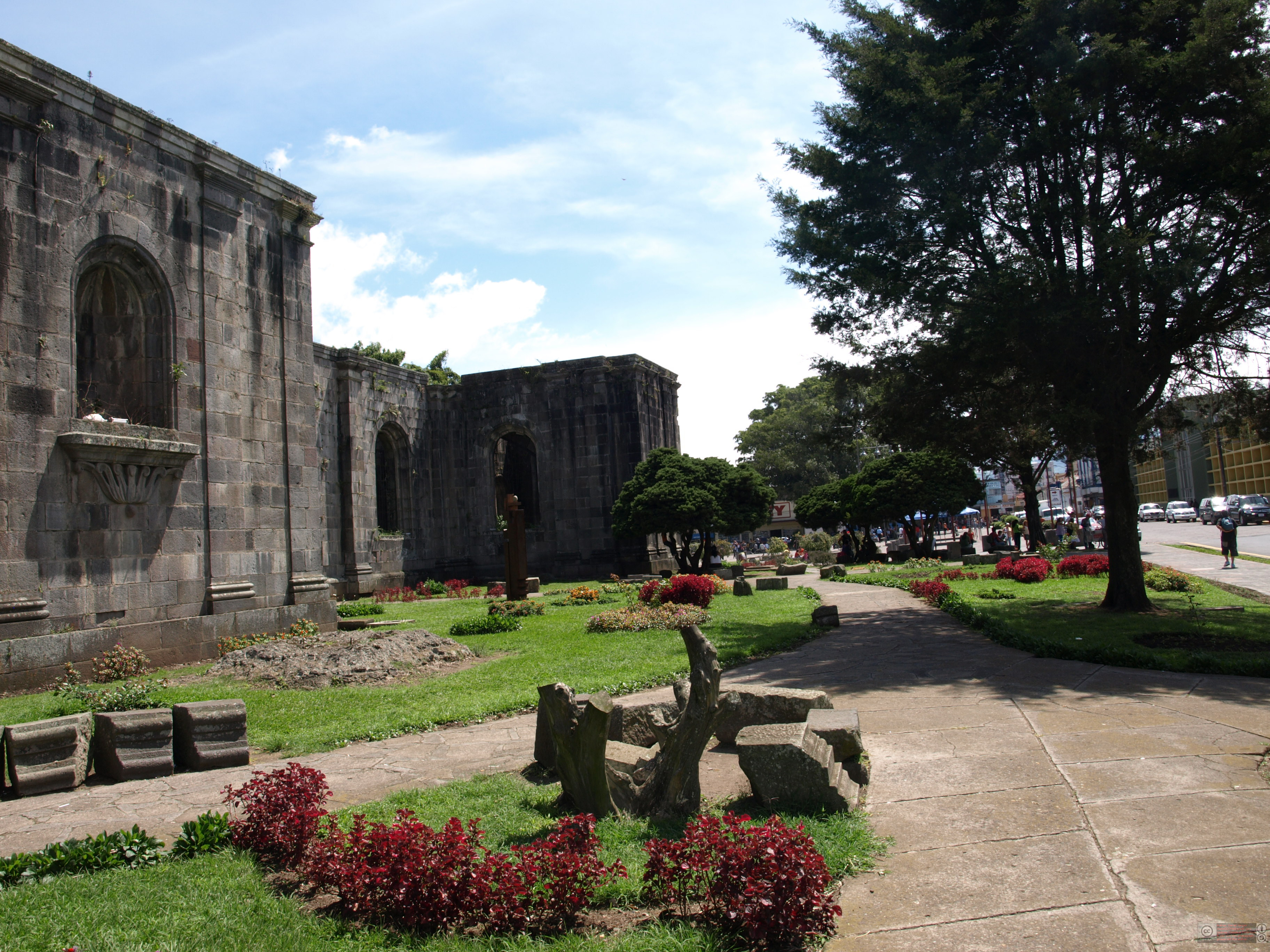

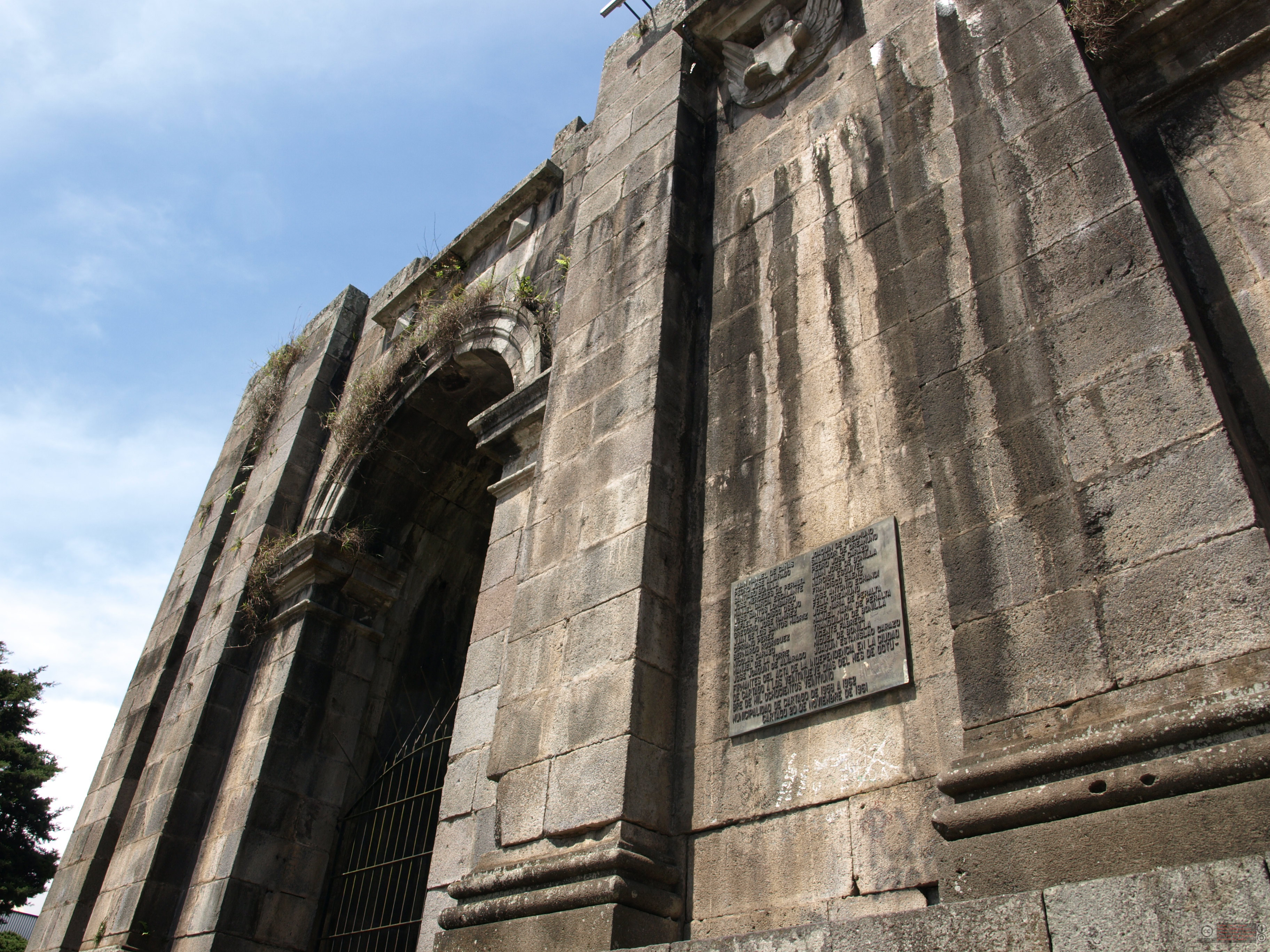

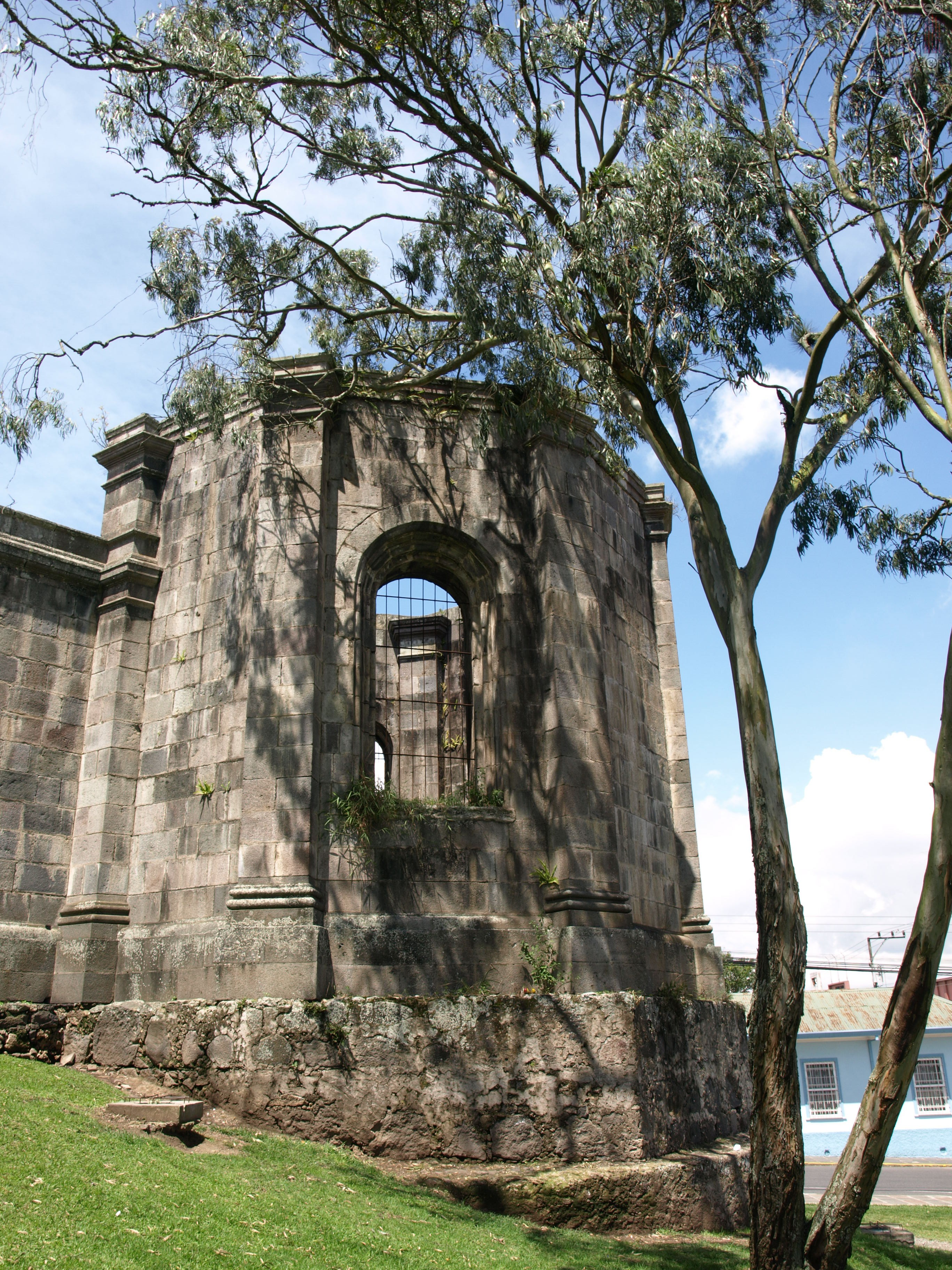

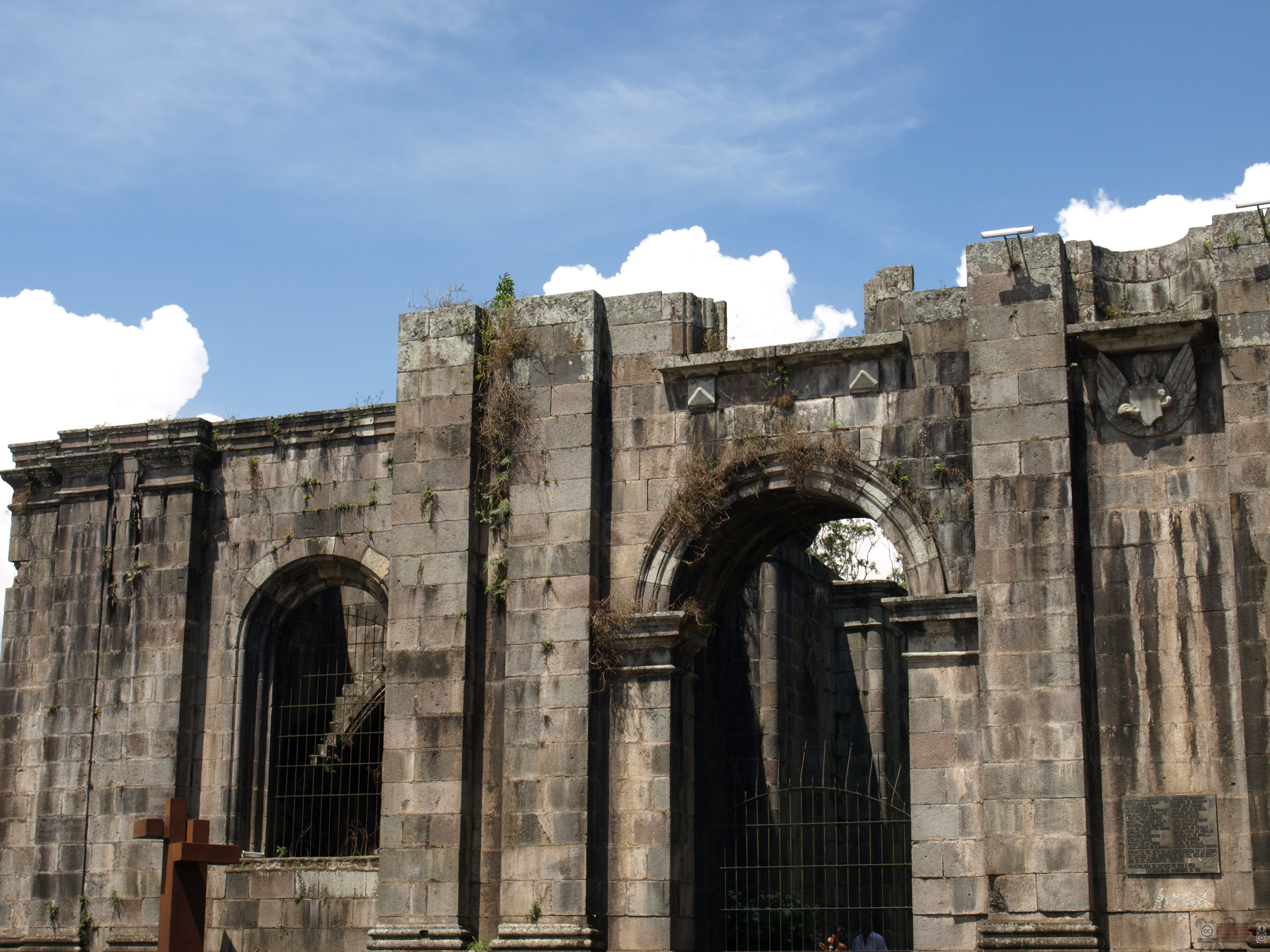

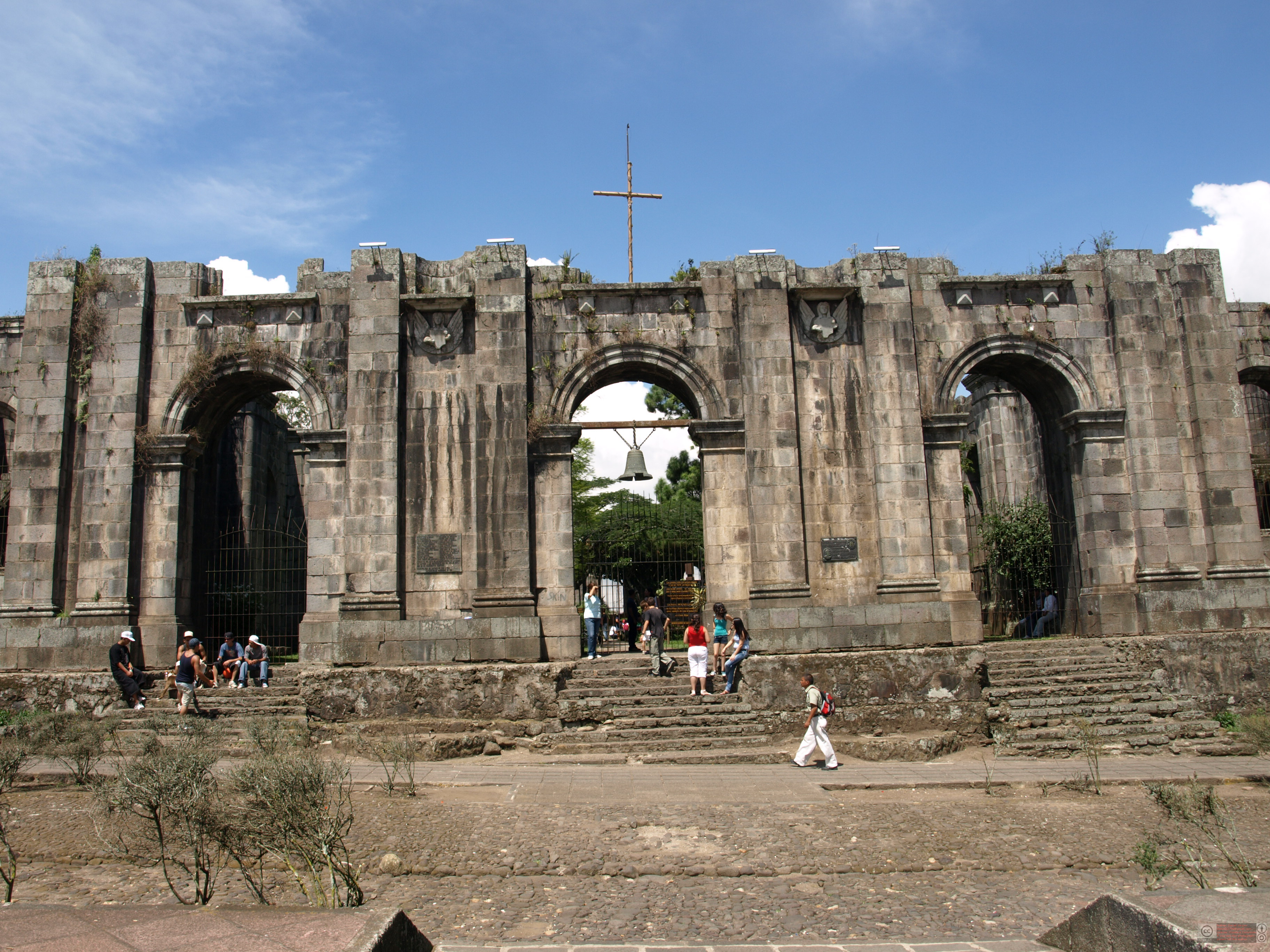
