= Canopy bridge =

Wildlife bridge between trees over a road

A canopy bridge connects two or more large trees on either sides of the road to facilitate the crossing of wildlife, especially primates, from one part of the forest to the other and help mitigate roadkills.

They have been established for primates and small mammals by the Reconecta project in Brazil in urban and rural areas and in Suriname, for primates by Anamalai Tiger Reserve in Tamil Nadu, and for squirrels by Longview, Washington.

== See also ==
- Wildlife crossing
