= Index of Central America–related articles =

This is an index of Central America-related articles. This index defines Central America as the seven nations of Belize, Costa Rica, El Salvador, Guatemala, Honduras, Nicaragua, and Panama.

== 0–9 ==
- .bz Internet country code top-level domain for Belize
- .cr Internet country code top-level domain for Costa Rica
- .gt Internet country code top-level domain for Guatemala
- .hn Internet country code top-level domain for Honduras
- .ni Internet country code top-level domain for Nicaragua
- .pa Internet country code top-level domain for Panama
- .sv Internet country code top-level domain for El Salvador
- 1934 Central America hurricane
- 1941 Atlantic hurricane season
- 2001 El Salvador earthquakes

== A ==
- Ages of consent in North America
- Americas (terminology)
- List of the busiest airports in Central America

== B ==
- Vasco Núñez de Balboa
- Bay Islands Department
- Bay of San Miguel
- Belize
  - List of Belize-related topics
  - Belizean Kriol language
  - Belizean people
  - List of birds of Belize
- Endemic birds of Mexico and northern Central America
- List of birds of Costa Rica
- List of birds of El Salvador
- List of birds of Guatemala
- List of birds of Honduras
- List of birds of Nicaragua
- List of birds of Panama
- Boruca
  - Boruca language
- Bribri
  - Bribri language
- British Honduras 1862-1981
- Buddhism in Central America

== C ==
- Canada Central American Free Trade Agreement
- Cantons of Costa Rica
- Captaincy General of Guatemala 1609-1821
- Caribbean Sea
- Central America
- Central America Volcanic Arc
- Central American and Caribbean Games
  - 1926 Central American and Caribbean Games
  - 1930 Central American and Caribbean Games
  - 1935 Central American and Caribbean Games
  - 1938 Central American and Caribbean Games
  - 1946 Central American and Caribbean Games
  - 1950 Central American and Caribbean Games
  - 1954 Central American and Caribbean Games
  - 1959 Central American and Caribbean Games
  - 1962 Central American and Caribbean Games
  - 1966 Central American and Caribbean Games
  - 1970 Central American and Caribbean Games
  - 1974 Central American sus Caribbean Games
  - 1978 Central American and Caribbean Games
  - 1982 Central American and Caribbean Games
  - 1986 Central American and Caribbean Games
  - 1990 Central American and Caribbean Games
  - 1993 Central American and Caribbean Games
  - 1998 Central American and Caribbean Games
  - 2002 Central American and Caribbean Games
  - 2006 Central American and Caribbean Games
- Central American crisis
- Central American Defense Council
- Central American Football Union
- Central American Integration System
- Central American music
- Central American pine-oak forests
- Central American Seaway
- Central American Spanish
- Central American Unionist Party
- Central Highlands (Central America)
- Central Time killer (Americas)
- CEPAL (United Nations Economic Commission for Latin America and the Caribbean)
- Chibchan languages
- Choco languages
- Chorotega
- Christopher Columbus (Cristoforo Colombo, Cristóbal Colón)
- Cinco de Mayo
- List of cities in Costa Rica
- List of cities in El Salvador
- List of places in Guatemala
- List of cities in Honduras
- List of cities in Panama
- Confederate settlements in British Honduras
- Congress of Guatemala
- Congress of Panama
- Conservation in Belize
- Constituencies of Belize
- Constitution of Belize
- Constitution of Guatemala
- Constitution of Nicaragua
- Contras
- Cordillera Central
- Cordillera de Talamanca
- Costa Rica
  - Costa Rican Civil War
  - List of Conservation Areas of Costa Rica
  - Costa Rican cuisine
  - Culture of Costa Rica
- Cueva people
- Cuisine of Belize
- Culture of Belize
- Culture of El Salvador
- Culture of Guatemala
- Culture of Honduras
- Culture of Nicaragua
- Culture of Panama

== D ==
- Darién Gap
- Darién Province
- Darien scheme
- Demographics of Belize
- Demographics of Costa Rica
- Demographics of El Salvador
- Demographics of Guatemala
- Demographics of Honduras
- Demographics of Nicaragua
- Demographics of Panama
- Departments of El Salvador
- Departments of Guatemala
- Departments of Honduras
- Departments of Nicaragua
- List of diplomatic missions of Belize
- List of diplomatic missions of Costa Rica
- List of diplomatic missions of El Salvador
- List of diplomatic missions of Guatemala
- List of diplomatic missions of Honduras
- List of diplomatic missions of Nicaragua
- List of diplomatic missions of Panama
- Districts of Belize
- Districts of Costa Rica
- Districts of Panama
- Dominican Republic – Central America Free Trade Agreement (DR-CAFTA)

== E ==
- Eastern Time Zone
- Economy of Belize
- Economy of Costa Rica
- Economy of El Salvador
- Economy of Guatemala
- Economy of Honduras
- Economy of Nicaragua
- Economy of Panama
- Education in Belize
- Education in Costa Rica
- Education in El Salvador
- Education in Guatemala
- Education in Honduras
- Education in Nicaragua
- Education in Panama
- El Niño-Southern Oscillation
- El Salvador
  - Salvadoran cuisine
  - List of Salvadorans
- Elections in Belize
- Elections in Costa Rica
- Elections in El Salvador
- Elections in Guatemala
- Elections in Honduras
- Elections in Nicaragua
- Elections in Panama
- List of endemic species of Belize
- Ethnic groups in Central America
- Extreme points of Central America

== F ==
- Fauna of Belize
- Federal Republic of Central America 1823-1838
- FIBA COCABA Championship
- Flora of Belize
- Football War
- Foreign relations of Belize
- Foreign relations of Costa Rica
- Foreign relations of El Salvador
- Foreign relations of Guatemala
- Foreign relations of Honduras
- Foreign relations of Nicaragua
- Foreign relations of Panama
- FSLN (Sandinista National Liberation Front)

== G ==
- Garifuna people
  - Garifuna language
- Geography of Belize
- Geography of Costa Rica
- Geography of El Salvador
- Geography of Guatemala
- Geography of Honduras
- Geography of Nicaragua
- Geography of Panama
- German colonization of the Americas
- Government of Nicaragua
- Gran Colombia (Republic of Colombia 1819-1831)
- Granadine Confederation 1858-1863
- Great Blue Hole
- Guatemala
  - Guatemalan cuisine
  - List of Guatemalans
- Guaymí
- Gulf of Darién
- Gulf of Fonseca
- Gulf of Honduras
- Gulf of Panama
- Guna language
- Guna people

== H ==
- Hay–Bunau-Varilla Treaty of 1903
- Hispanic America
- History of Belize
- History of Central America
- History of Costa Rica
- History of El Salvador
- History of Guatemala
- History of Honduras
- History of Nicaragua
- History of Panama
- Honduras
  - Honduran cuisine
  - Hondurans
    - List of Hondurans
- Hurricane Mitch 1998

== I ==
- Indigenous languages of the Americas
- Indigenous peoples of the Americas
- International rankings of Costa Rica
- International rankings of Nicaragua
- Iran–Contra affair
- List of islands of Central America
  - List of islands of Belize
  - List of islands of Costa Rica
  - List of islands of El Salvador
  - List of islands of Guatemala
  - List of islands of Honduras
  - List of islands of Nicaragua
  - List of islands of Panama
- ISO 3166-2:BZ code for Belize
- ISO 3166-2:CR code for Costa Rica
- ISO 3166-2:GT code for Guatemala
- ISO 3166-2:HN code for Honduras
- ISO 3166-2:NI code for Nicaragua
- ISO 3166-2:PA code for Panama
- ISO 3166-2:SV code for El Salvador
- Isthmus of Panama

== L ==
- Lake Managua
- Lake Nicaragua
- Land mines in Central America
- List of endangered languages in Central America
- Languages of Belize
- Languages of Costa Rica
- Languages of Nicaragua
- Latin America
  - Latin America – United States relations
  - Latin American cuisine
- Lenca language
- Lenca people
- Liberalism in Honduras
- Liberalism in Nicaragua
- Liberalism in Panama

== M ==
- Macro-Chibchan languages
- Maleku people
  - Maléku language
- Mallarino–Bidlack Treaty of 1846
- List of mammals of Central America
- Maya civilization
- Maya peoples
- Maya ruins of Belize
- Maya script
- Mayan languages
  - Mayan sign languages
- Mesoamerica
- Mesoamerican Barrier Reef System
- Mesoamerican Biological Corridor
- Mesoamerican Linguistic Area
- Mesoamerican literature
- Mesoamerican region
- Mestizo
- Middle America (Americas)
- Military of Belize
- Military of Costa Rica
- Armed Forces of El Salvador
- Military of Guatemala
- Military of Honduras
- Military of Nicaragua
- Military of Panama
- Miskito people
  - Miskito Coastal Creole
  - Miskito language
- Mopan language
- Mopan people
- Mosquito Coast (Miskito Coast)
- Mountain peaks of Central America
  - List of Ultras in Central America
- Municipalities of El Salvador
- Municipalities of Guatemala
- Municipalities of Honduras
- Municipalities of Nicaragua
- List of museums in Costa Rica
- List of museums in Nicaragua
- Central American music
  - Music of Belize
  - Music of Costa Rica
  - Music of El Salvador
  - Music of Guatemala
  - Music of Honduras
  - Music of Nicaragua
  - Music of Panama

== N ==
- Naso people
- National Assembly of Belize
- National Assembly of Nicaragua
- National Assembly of Panama
- National Congress of Honduras
- National symbols of Nicaragua
- Nicaragua
  - Nicaraguan cuisine
  - Nicaraguans
    - List of Nicaraguans
- Nicaragua Canal
- Nicaragua v. United States
- Nicaraguan Revolution
- North America

== O ==
- Oto-Manguean languages

== P ==
- Pacific Ocean
- Pan-American Highway
- Panama
  - Panamanian cuisine
  - List of Panamanians
- Panama Canal
  - History of the Panama Canal
  - Panama Canal Zone 1903-1979
- Panama Railway
- Panama - United States Trade Promotion Agreement of 2007
- Pipil people
  - Pipil language
- Political history of Nicaragua
- List of political parties in Central America by country
  - List of political parties in Belize
  - List of political parties in Costa Rica
  - List of political parties in El Salvador
  - List of political parties in Guatemala
  - List of political parties in Honduras
  - List of political parties in Nicaragua
  - List of political parties in Panama
- Politics of Belize
- Politics of Costa Rica
- Politics of El Salvador
- Politics of Guatemala
- Politics of Honduras
- Politics of Nicaragua
- Politics of Panama
- Portal:Belize
- Portal:Costa Rica
- Portal:El Salvador
- Portal:Guatemala
- Portal:Nicaragua
- Portal:Panama
- List of prime ministers of Belize
- List of presidents of Costa Rica
- President of El Salvador
- President of Guatemala
- President of Honduras
  - List of presidents of Honduras
- President of Nicaragua
- List of heads of state of Panama
- Protected areas of Nicaragua
- Proto-Mayan extinct language
- Provinces and regions of Panama
- Provinces of Costa Rica

== Q ==
- Q'eqchi' language
- Q'eqchi' people

== R ==
- Rail transport in Central America
- Rama language
- Rama people
- Religion in Belize
- Religion in Costa Rica
- Religion in El Salvador
- Religion in Guatemala
- Religion in Honduras
- Religion in Nicaragua
- Religion in Panama
- Republic of Central America 1896-1898
- Republic of New Granada 1831-1858
- List of rivers of Belize
- List of rivers of Honduras

== S ==
- Salvadoran Civil War
- Sandinista National Liberation Front (FSLN)
- List of schools in Honduras
- List of schools in Nicaragua
- South America
- Sport in Belize
- Sport in Honduras

== T ==
- Telecommunications in Belize
- Telecommunications in Costa Rica
- Telecommunications in El Salvador
- Telecommunications in Guatemala
- Telecommunications in Honduras
- Telecommunications in Nicaragua
- Telecommunications in Panama
- Teribe language
- Torrijos–Carter Treaties of 1977
- Tourism in Belize
- Tourism in Costa Rica
- Tourism in Nicaragua
- List of town tramway systems in Central America
- Transport in Belize
- Transport in El Salvador
- Transport in Guatemala
- Transport in Honduras
- Transport in Nicaragua
- Transport in Panama
- Transport in Costa Rica

== U ==
- United Nations Economic Commission for Latin America and the Caribbean (CEPAL)
- United States invasion of Panama 1989
- United States occupation of Nicaragua 1912-1933
- United States of Colombia 1863-1886
- List of universities in Belize
- List of universities in Costa Rica
- List of universities in El Salvador
- List of universities in Guatemala
- List of universities in Honduras
- List of universities in Nicaragua
- List of universities in Panama

== V ==
- Viceroyalty of New Granada 1717-1819
- Viceroyalty of New Spain 1535-1821
- List of volcanoes in Costa Rica
- List of volcanoes in El Salvador
- List of volcanoes in Guatemala
- List of volcanoes in Honduras
- List of volcanoes in Nicaragua
- List of volcanoes in Panama

== W ==
- Category:Waterfalls of Costa Rica
- Wildlife of Costa Rica
- Wildlife of Nicaragua
- List of Central American writers

== X ==
- Xinca language
- Xinca people

== Y ==
- Yucatán Peninsula
- Yucatec Maya language

== See also ==
- Anglo-America
- List of Caribbean-related topics
- Lists of country-related topics
  - Index of Belize-related articles
- Outline of North America
- Outline of South America
