= Last Days of the Maya =

- Narrated by: Salvatore F. Vecchio
- Countries of origin: Guatemala; Canada
- Original language: English

Production
- Producers: Simon Boyce, Steven Talley
- Cinematography: Neil Rettig
- Editors: K. M. Kral; Melanie Soich
- Running time: 90 minutes

Original release
- Release: November 27, 2005

Last Days of the Maya, released to DVD under the title Royal Maya Massacre, is a 2005 television documentary film in the television series Explorer on the National Geographic Channel.

The documentary tracks the discovery and excavation of two graves beneath the ruins of Cancuén, once a prominent Maya city-state.

The archaeological finds documented are presented by National Geographic magazine as evidence of the beginning of the end of the Maya city-states.

== Plot ==
The documentary tracks a joint National Geographic Society/Guatemalan Ministry of Culture funded expedition to discover whether there are any grave sites buried beneath the ruins of Cancuén, a city-state in the Petén Basin (modern-day Guatemala). The city rose to prominence during the forty-year reign of King Taj Chan Ahk, and it is believed to have developed into an ancient trading centre linking the American continents. It is speculated that there could be several mass graves in the temple district.

Approximately, the first twenty minutes of the documentary is a vivid introductory footage showing the lay of the land, a re-enactment of a bartering market in Cancuén, the riches that would have been imported by the aristocrats of the city, and some of the findings already made. A further five minutes is spent covering the archaeologists searching for graves, before cutting to a site on the border of the city believed to contain a 12 m^{2} grave.

Leading the dig is American anthropologist Arthur Demarest, who had discovered evidence of a mass grave after beginning the excavation of Cancuén in 1999. Within a year of beginning work on reconstructing the royal palace, when the size of the complex was realised, he had plans to employ local Maya villagers as guides to a site for eco-tourism; these new finds had far wider implications and the Ministry of Culture gave Demarest a team of archaeologists schooled in the history of the Petén.

As Demarest's grave is gradually revealed to be a tiled pool, a type of tomb used for ritual killings, and the sheer number of victims becomes apparent—in all, the remains of 31 men, women and children are found—the archaeologists on site are given pause. The victims' demise had none of the hallmarks of traditional human sacrifices, and when the bones are examined by physical anthropologists it is discovered that they were not captured slaves at all but nobility. The shape of the child victims' skulls, with the foreheads compressed into the parietal to form a slender rise, is found exclusively in Maya children of noble birth.

They are more surprised by the state in which the victims had been buried. The motive was not plundering, as they died wearing jade jewellery. Instead, individuals may have been hunted down and slaughtered because the attackers left their weapons with the corpses and viciously stabbed the children, many of whom were under the age of twelve (adulthood), in the back of the neck. One skeleton suggests that the blade entered under the mandible, implying the victim had been grabbed by the head and pulled back upon it, execution style.

After traces of a fetus are found, the narrator announces this can only be the extermination of a family. A grisly account is given of the decline of the Maya civilisation. Within decades of a city-state collapsing displaced persons would sweep through the surrounding regions, preying upon merchants using largely unguarded trade routes, which led to the peasants turning traitor and causing widespread violence. There are several scenarios which could explain a revenge attack of this scale, but it seems most likely that the lower classes of Cancuén had revolted.

Half-way through the programme a royal burial is found 80 yards away from the pool, in the jungle outside of the city limits. The skeleton is identified as the remains of Kan Maax, a wealthy and powerful ruler of Cancuén who died around 800 AD, the same time as the royal family became extinct and approximately fifty years before the city was abandoned. It is observed that Maax had been buried in a shallow, unmarked grave "like a beggar", clear cut evidence that the killings were more than murder.

== Investigation ==
Scholars had recently come to believe that Cancuén was not only a secular society, but that its rulers also avoided war—"bobbing and weaving" alliances.
