= San Pedro Masahuat =

- Municipality
- Location in El Salvador
- Coordinates: 13°33′N 89°2′W
- Country: El Salvador
- Department: La Paz
- Elevation: 607 ft (185 m)

San Pedro Masahuat is a municipality in the La Paz department of El Salvador. It is located in the central part of the country, approximately 40 kilometers south of the capital city, San Salvador, and is known for its agricultural activities and cultural traditions.

== History ==
San Pedro Masahuat has a long history that dates back to pre-colonial times, with indigenous groups inhabiting the area before the arrival of the Spanish conquistadors. The town was officially founded during the Spanish colonial period and played a role in the regional economy due to its fertile land and agricultural output. Over the centuries, the town has developed a strong sense of community and cultural identity.

== Geography ==
The municipality is situated in the coastal plains of El Salvador, close to the Pacific Ocean. The area is characterized by its tropical climate, with a wet season from May to October and a dry season from November to April. The fertile lands around San Pedro Masahuat support various agricultural activities, including the cultivation of crops such as corn, beans, and sugarcane.

The nearby rivers and natural reserves make the region a site of ecological interest, with a variety of flora and fauna native to the region. The town is also prone to flooding, especially during the rainy season, and has been affected by natural disasters such as earthquakes and hurricanes.

== Economy ==
The economy of San Pedro Masahuat is primarily based on agriculture, with the majority of the population engaged in farming and livestock production. The main crops produced in the area include maize, beans, sugarcane, and various fruits and vegetables. In recent years, the municipality has also seen growth in the artisan and small-scale manufacturing sectors, with local crafts and products contributing to the economy.

== Culture ==
San Pedro Masahuat has a rich cultural heritage, with traditional festivals and religious events being an important part of the community's social life. The town celebrates its annual patron saint festival in honor of San Pedro, which takes place in June. This festival features religious processions, traditional music, dances, and local food.

== Infrastructure ==
The municipality has basic infrastructure, including schools, health clinics, and local markets. However, like many rural areas in El Salvador, San Pedro Masahuat faces challenges in terms of access to modern amenities such as clean water, reliable electricity, and paved roads.

== Natural disasters ==
San Pedro Masahuat has been historically vulnerable to natural disasters, particularly earthquakes and hurricanes. The town was significantly affected by the 2001 El Salvador earthquakes, which caused widespread damage to homes and infrastructure. The community has since worked on disaster preparedness and recovery efforts to mitigate future risks.

== Demographics ==
San Pedro Masahuat has a population of approximately 20,000 people, most of whom are of mestizo heritage. The population is predominantly Catholic, though there is a presence of other religious groups as well. The town's residents are known for their strong community bonds and traditional way of life.

== Transportation ==
San Pedro Masahuat is accessible by road, with several bus routes connecting it to nearby towns and the capital city of San Salvador. While the municipality's road network is functional, some areas remain difficult to access, particularly during the rainy season when flooding can cause disruptions to travel.
