= Crucifixion Standard =

C. 1505 painting by Luca Signorelli

The Crucifixion Standard (Italian: Stendardo della Crocifissione) is a double-sided c. 1502–1505 tempera on panel painting by Luca Signorelli, produced late in his career and now on the high altar of Sant'Antonio Abate church in Sansepolcro. The reverse shows Anthony the Great and John the Evangelist with brothers kneeling before them in hierarchical proportion, whilst the front shows the Crucifixion with Anthony, John, Mary Magdalene and the Virgin Mary.

== Gallery ==
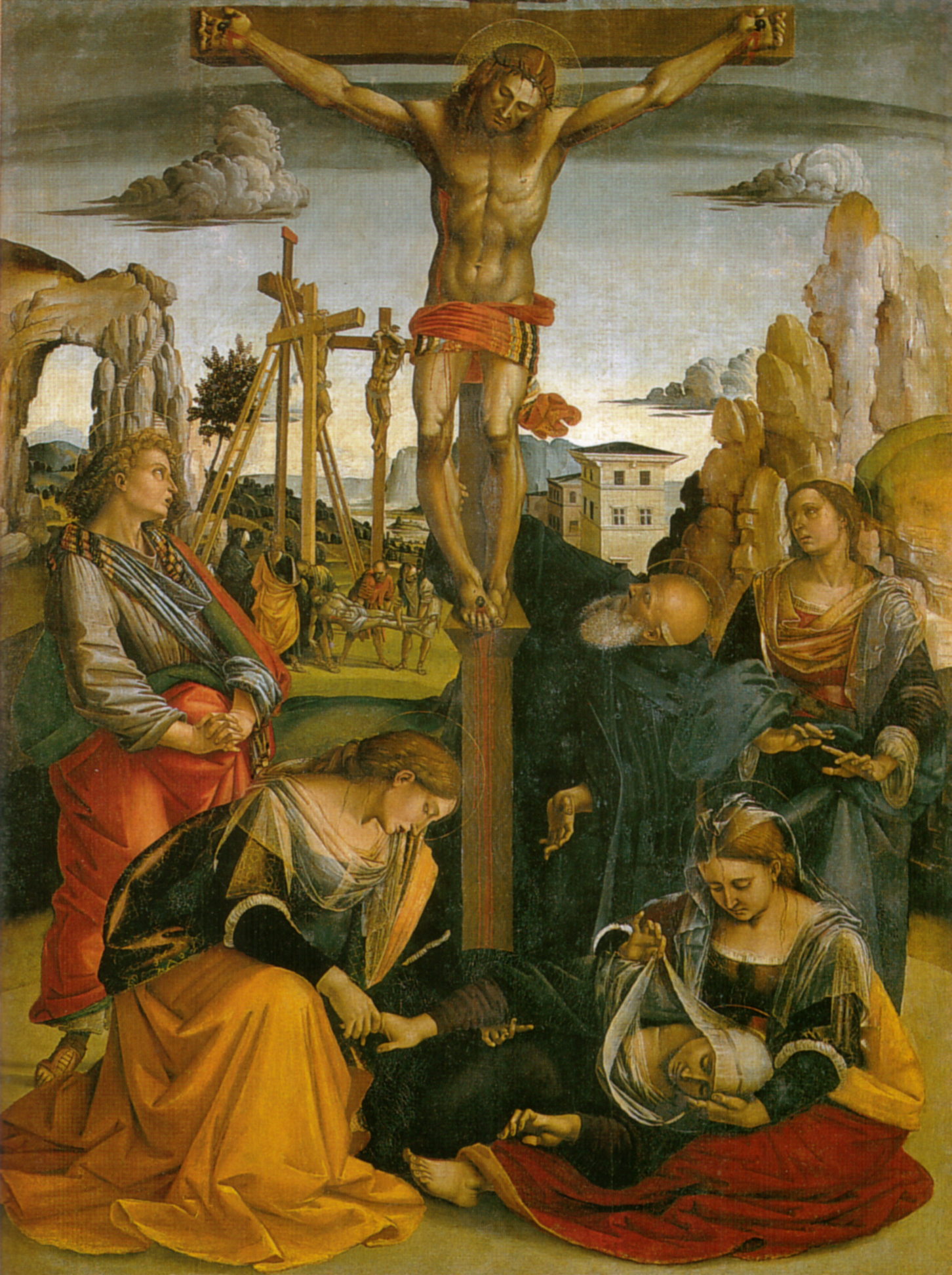
Obverse

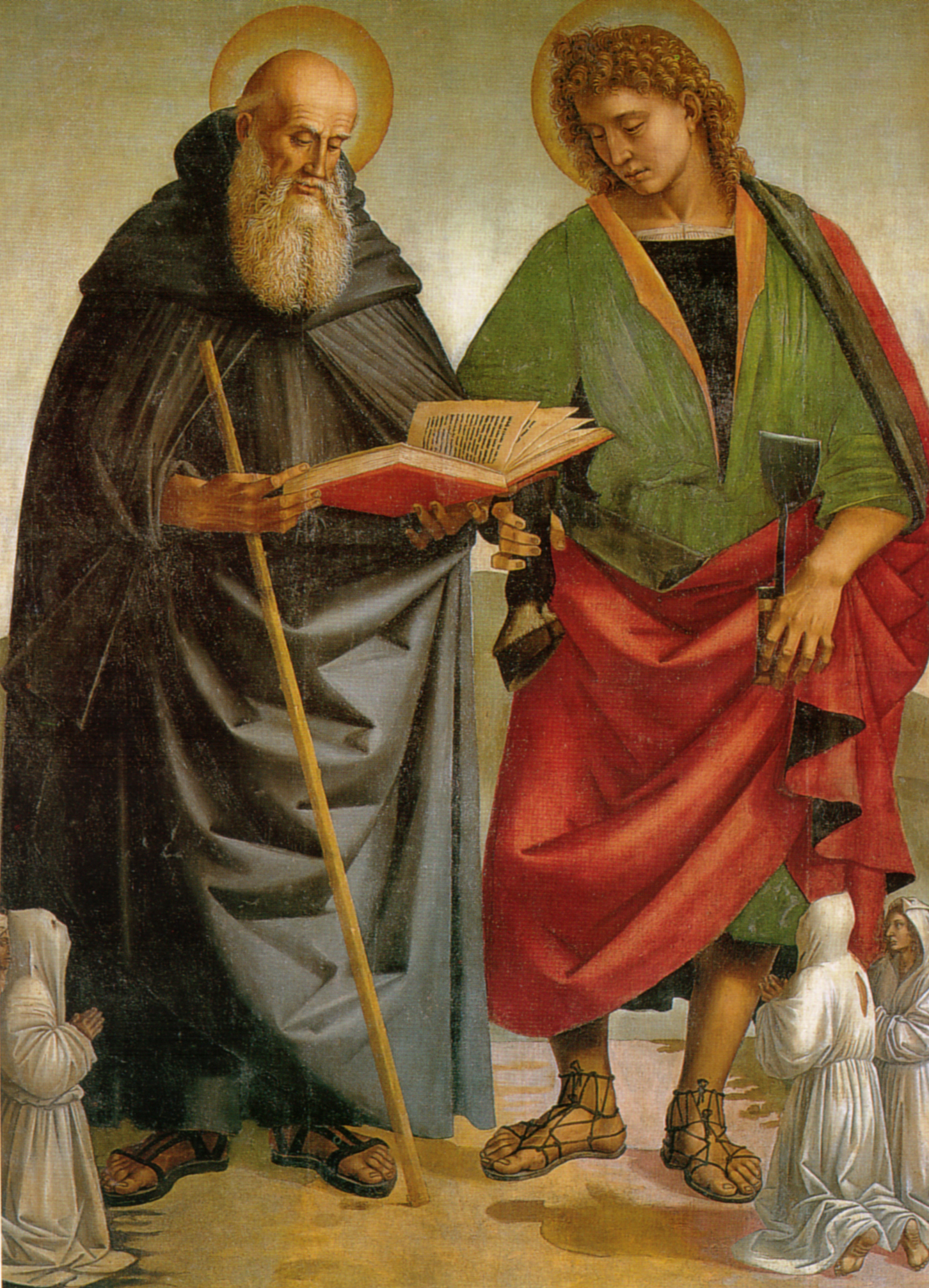
Reverse
