= Hierarchical proportion =

Art technique in sculpture and painting

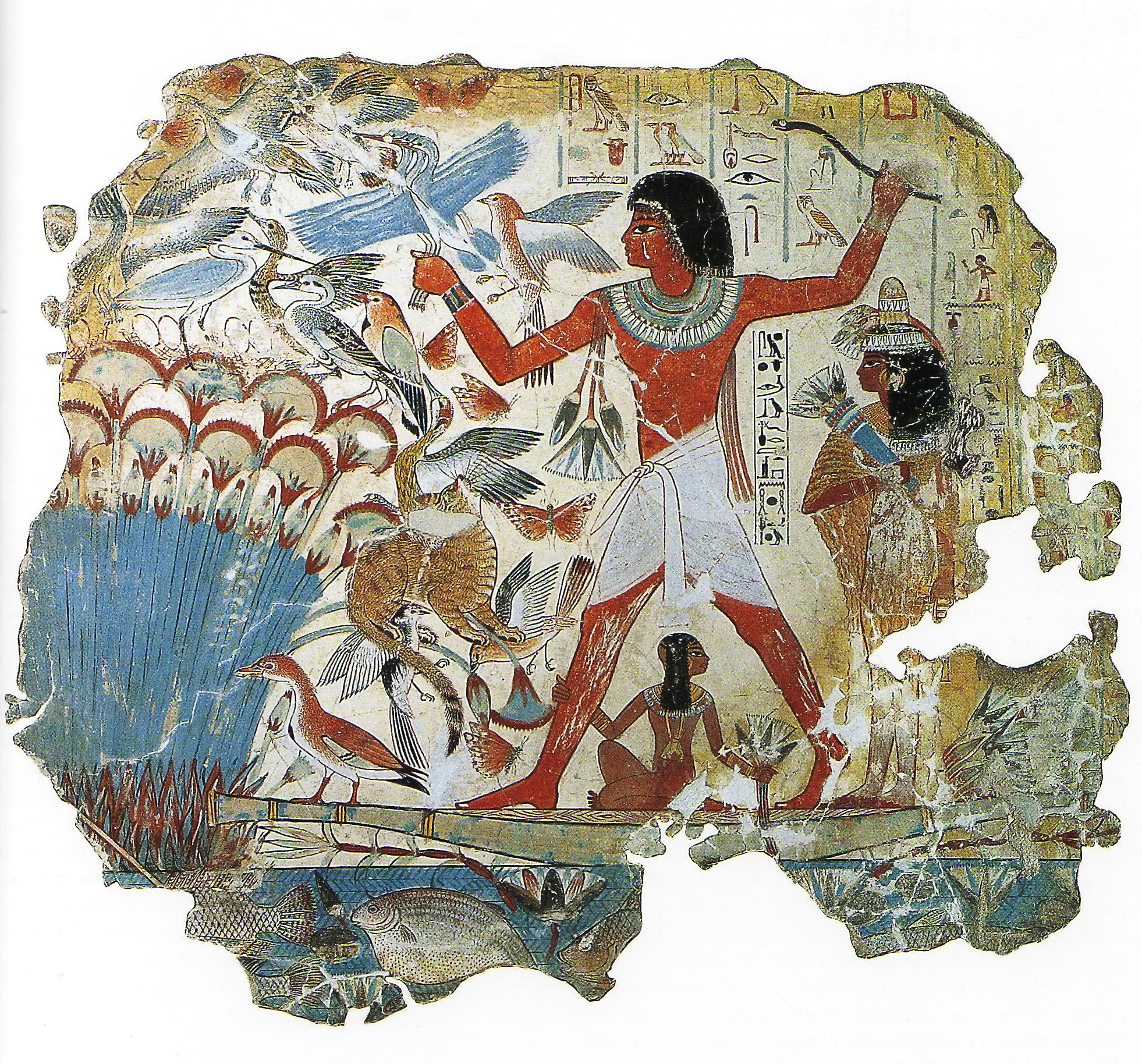
Nebamun hunting birds in the marshes using cats, fragment of a scene from the tomb-chapel of Nebamun, Thebes, Egypt Late 18th Dynasty, around 1350 BC.

Hierarchical proportion is a technique used in art, mostly in sculpture and painting, in which the artist uses unnatural proportion or scale to depict the relative importance of the figures in the artwork.

For example, in Egyptian times, people of higher status would sometimes be drawn or sculpted larger than those of lower status.

During the Dark Ages, people with more status had larger proportions than serfs. During the Renaissance images of the human body began to change, as proportion was used to depict the reality an artist interpreted.

== Gallery ==
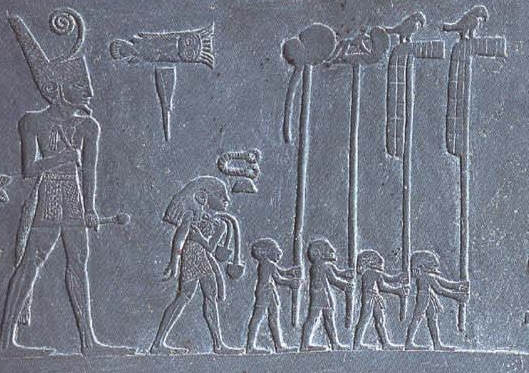
The Narmer Palette - obverse side, Early Dynastic Period of Egypt, about the 31st century BC

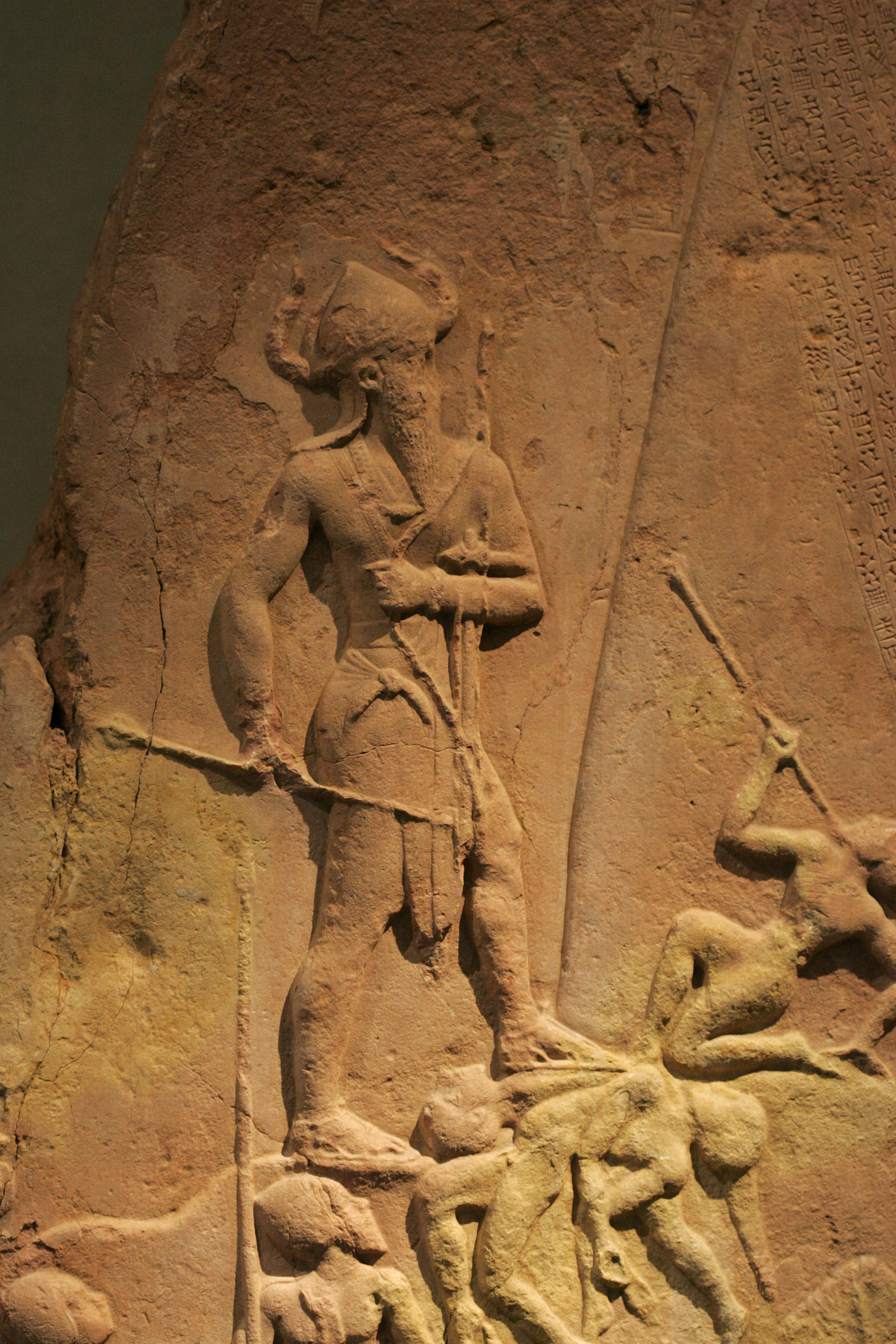
Victory stele of Naram Sin, the Akkadian Empire in ancient Mesopotamia, 2350 - 2000 BC

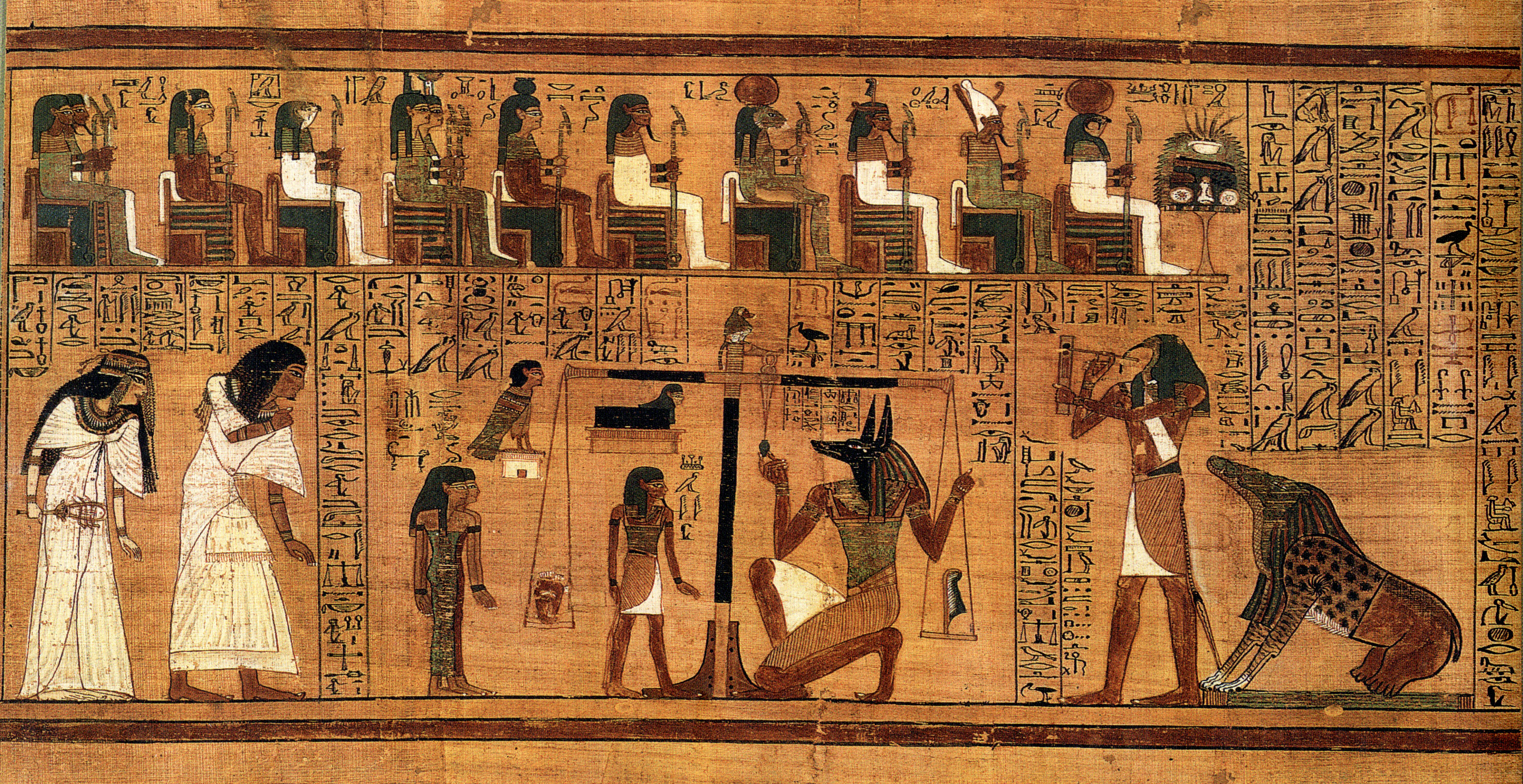
The Weighing of the Heart from the Book of the Dead of Ani, 19th dynasty of the New Kingdom of ancient Egypt, c. 1250 B.C.

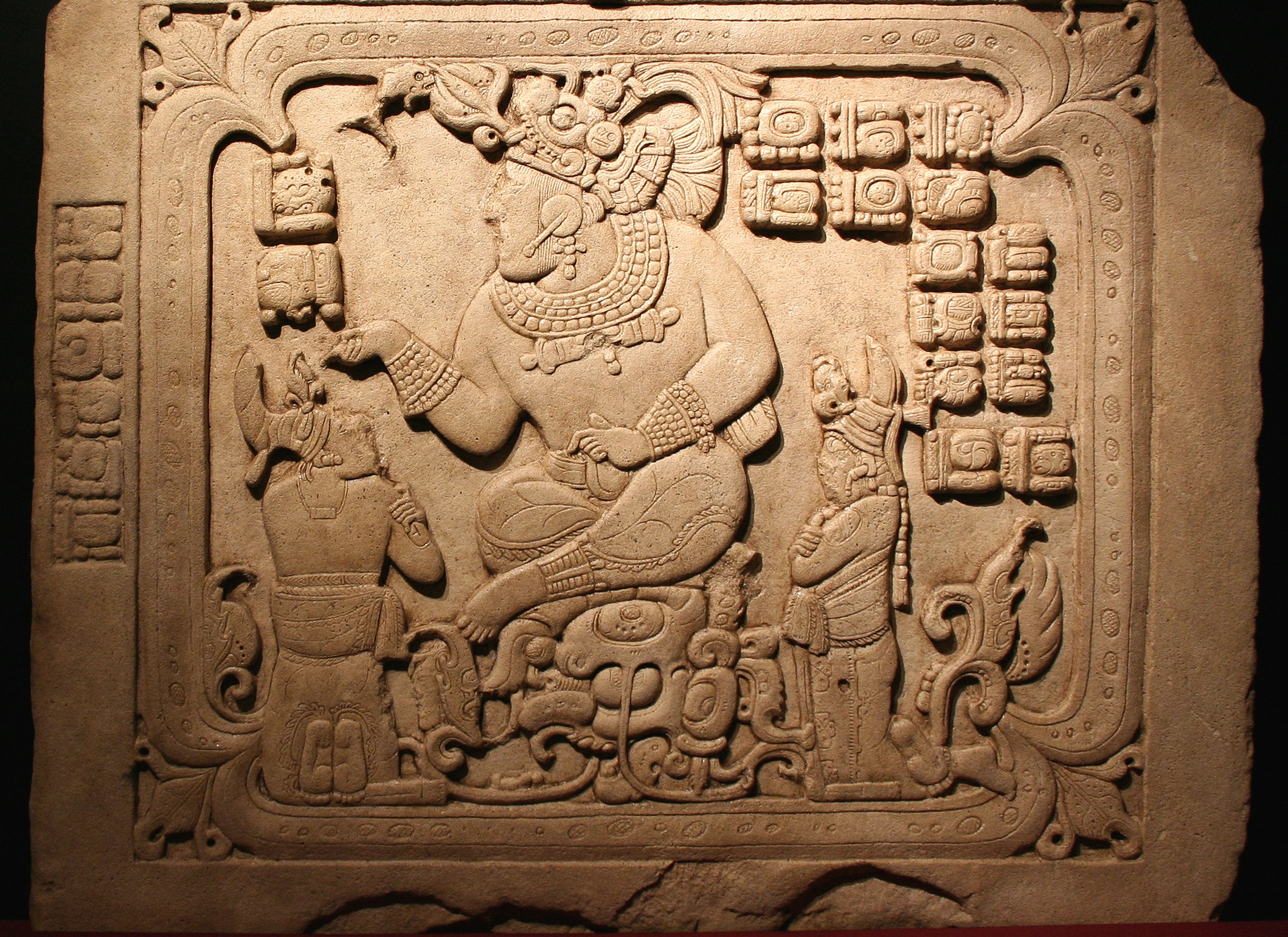
Panel 3 from Maya city Cancuén portraying the ruler Tajal Chan Ahk, 8th-century

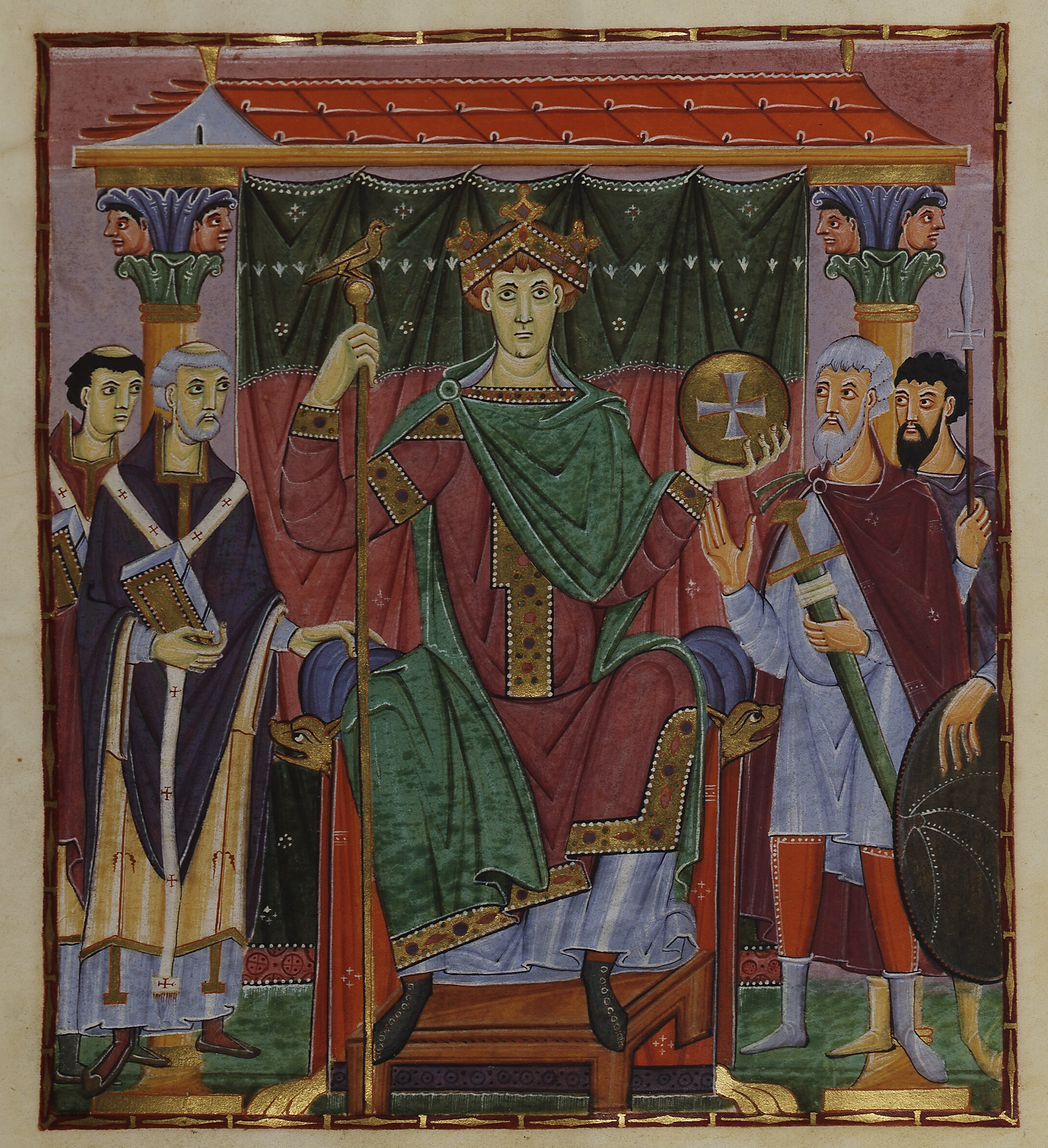
Otto III from the Gospels of Otto III, Reichenau Abbey in southern Germany, late 10th or early 11th century

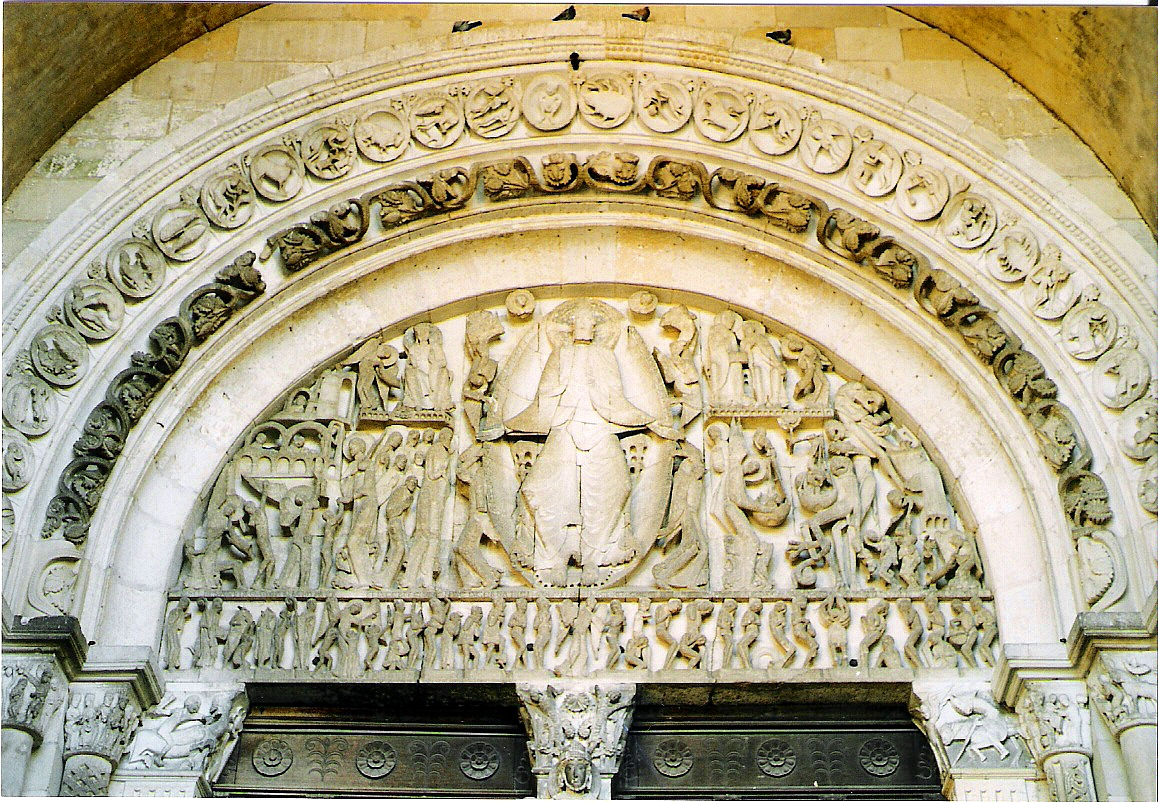
Last Judgement by Gislebertus in the west tympanum of the Autun Cathedral in France, 1120 - 1146.

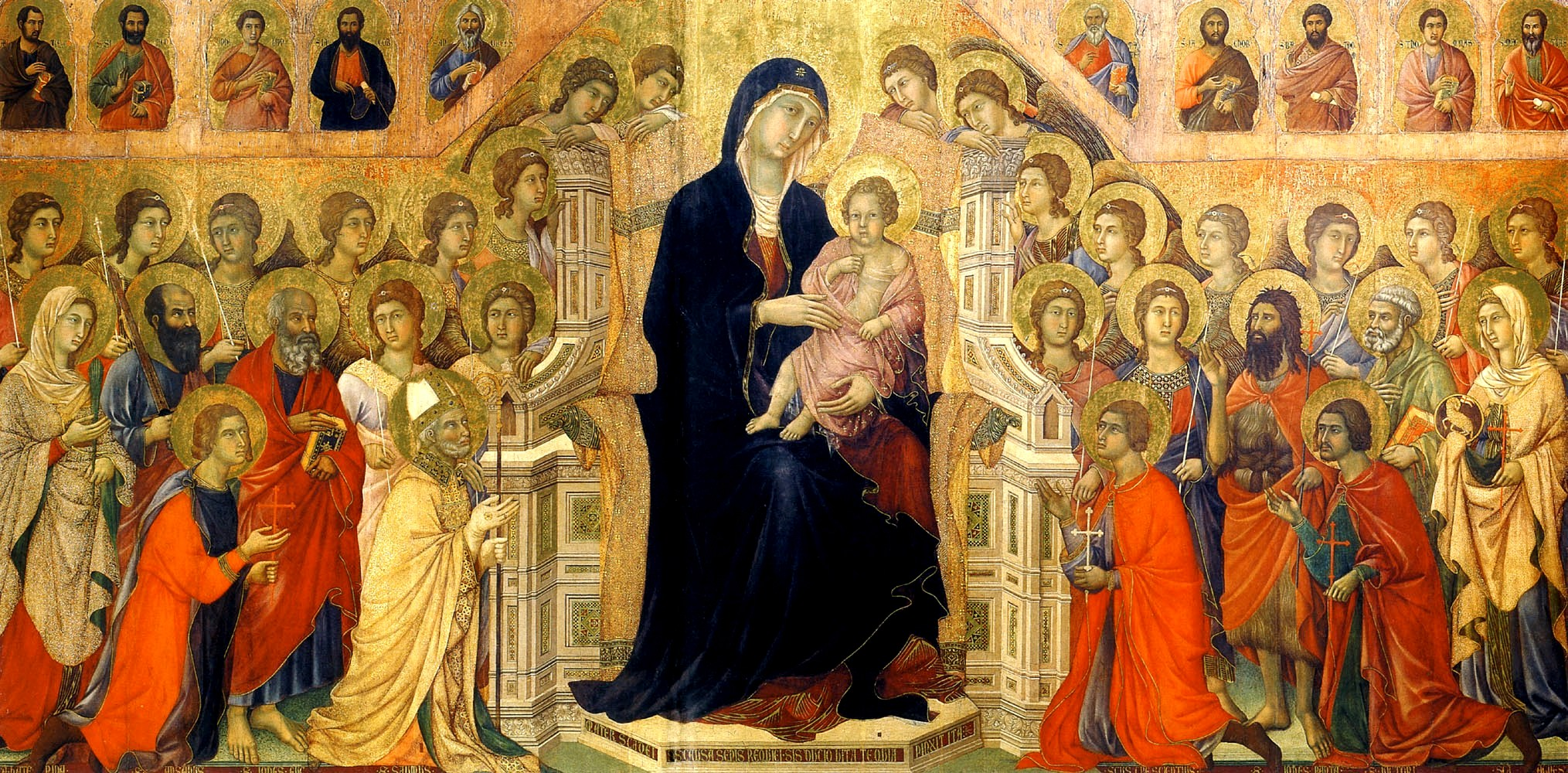
Maestà of Duccio, Siena, Italy, 1308 – 1311

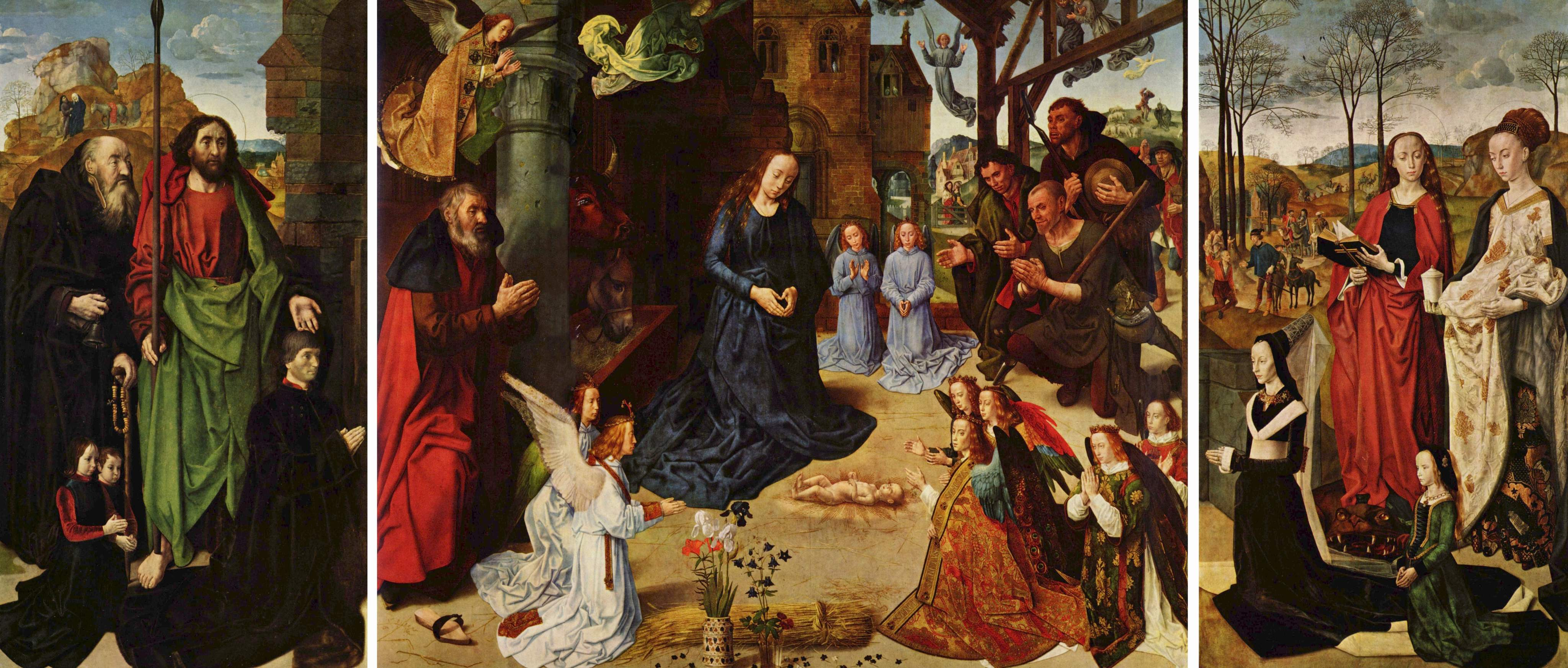
Portinari Altarpiece, Flemish painter Hugo van der Goes for the church of the hospital of Santa Maria Nuova in Florence in Italy, c. 1475.

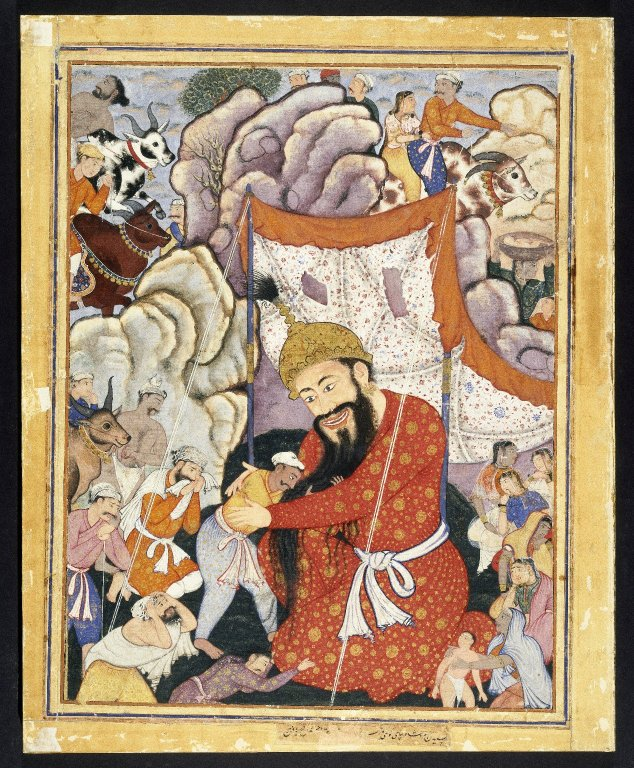
Zumurrud Shah takes refuge in the mountains (India, ca. 1570, illustration to Hamzanama)

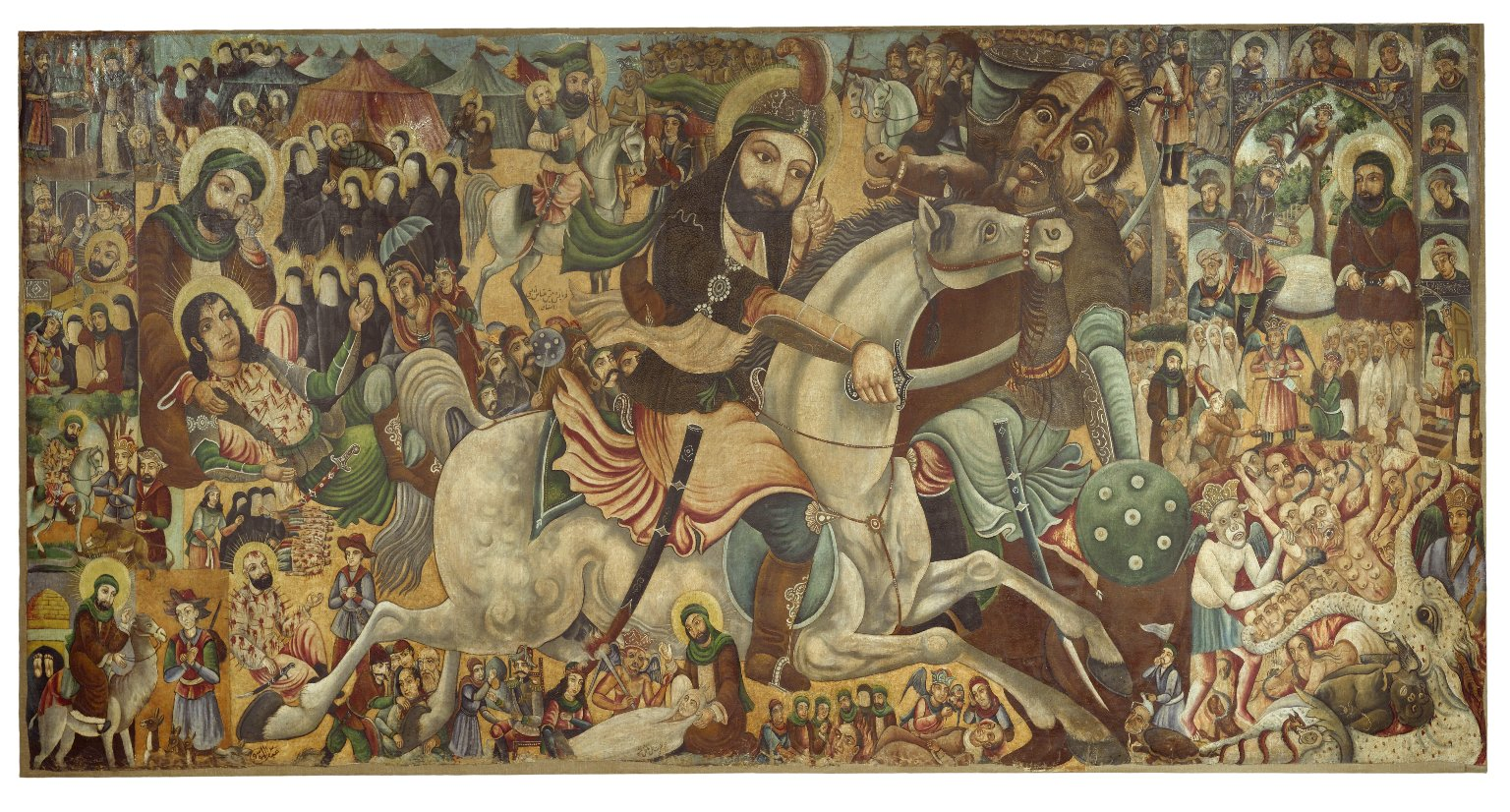
Battle of Karbala, Imam Husayn's half brother Abbas Al-Musavi in focus, Isfahan, Iran, late 19th - early 20th century

== See also ==
- Art movement
- Creativity techniques
- List of art media
- List of artistic media
- List of art movements
- List of most expensive paintings
- List of most expensive sculptures
- List of art techniques
- List of sculptors
