= Postal codes in Costa Rica =

Postal codes in Costa Rica are five-digit numeric, and were introduced in March 2013, they are associated with and identify a unique district in the country. They are managed by the Correos de Costa Rica, a government-controlled institution that provides postal service in the country.

The first digit denotes one of the seven provinces, the second and third refer to a specific canton in the aforementioned province, and the fourth and fifth represent a specific district within the canton.

The numbers are equivalent to the codes used by the National Institute of Statistics and Census of Costa Rica and the Administrative Territorial Division (Spanish: División Territorial Administrativa) to uniquely identify a district in the country.

== See also ==
- Districts of Costa Rica
- Administrative divisions of Costa Rica
