= Administrative divisions of Costa Rica =

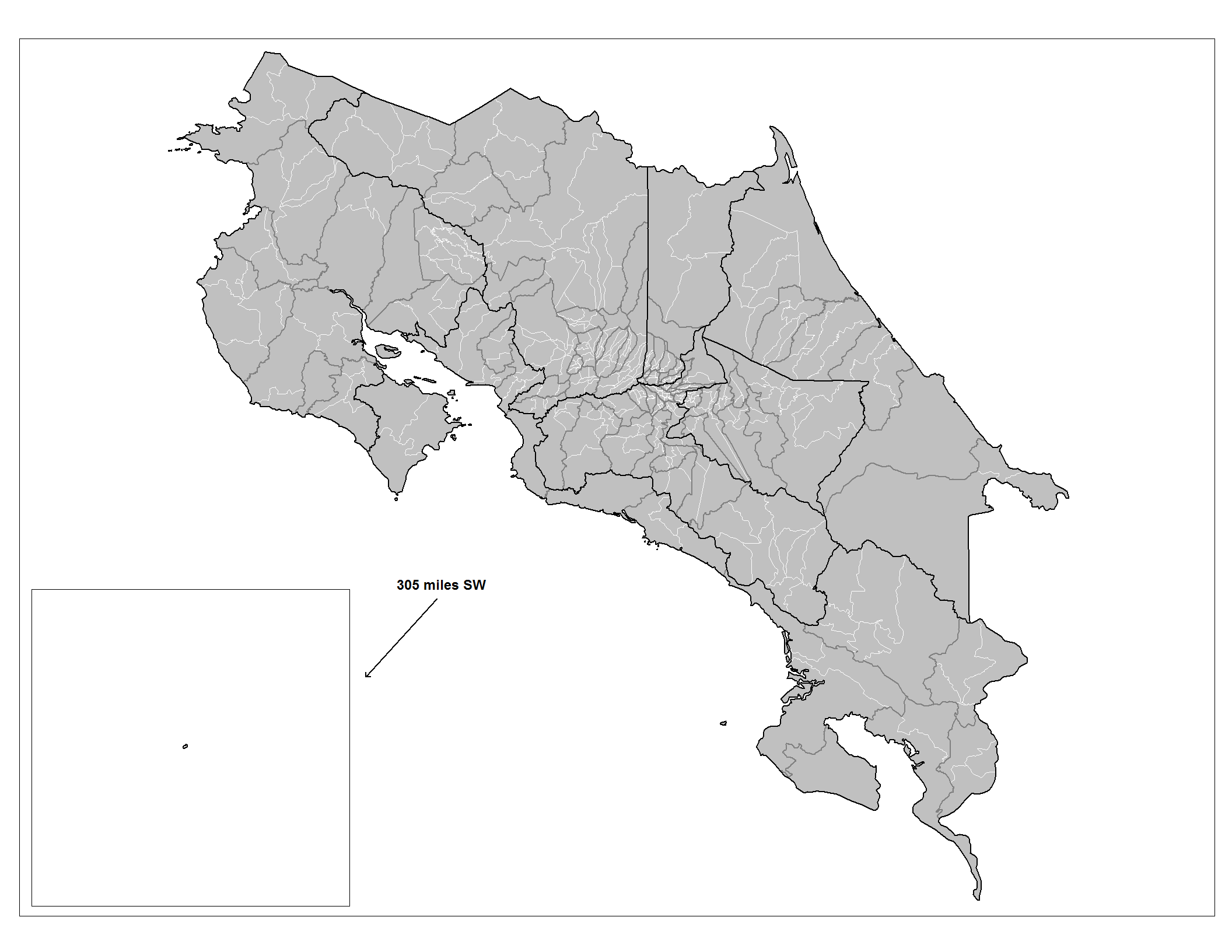
provinces, cantons, districts of Costa Rica

According to the Political Constitution of Costa Rica of 1949, in article 168, the territorial division of Costa Rica is organized by law into three types of subnational entity:

For the purposes of the Public Administration, the national territory is divided into provinces, these in cantons and cantons in districts.

Costa Rica is divided into:

- 7 provinces
- 84 cantons
- 492 districts

The most recent decree to this subdivision corresponds to N°41548-MGP from 28 January 2019.

All entities are numbered, the provinces get 1 digit, the cantons 3 digit with the first being the number of the province, the districts get 5 digits with the first 3 being the numbers of the canton.

The district numbers are also used as postal codes.

== History ==
With the establishment of the republic and the declaration of Costa Rica as "free, sovereign and independent republic," the Political Constitution of the Reformed Costa Rica of 1848 was approved on November 30 Of that year, and according to Law No. 36 of December 7 of 1848, the denominations of province, canton & district. According to the aforementioned law, the following provinces were created:

- San José, with one canton and ten parish districts.
- Alajuela, with two cantons and eight parish districts.
- Cartago, with two cantons and thirteen parish districts.
- Heredia, with one canton and seven parish districts.
- Guanacaste, with four cantons and eight parish districts.

This law classified Puntarenas as county, a category that is now in disuse. Legislative Decree No. 10 of September 17, 1858 gives Puntarenas the title of province.

Decree No. 27 of June 6, 1870 created the "County of Limón" from the easternmost territory of the Province of Cartago, and allowed the establishment of a town hall. It would not be until 1902, under Legislative Decree No. 59 of August 1 that it was constituted in the seventh and last of the provinces that comprise the national territory.

From 1848 to 1980 the number of cantons in the country has gone from 10 to 82. The last canton to be constituted is the Rio Cuarto ancient district of Greece province of Alajuela. The districts, on the other hand, have experienced greater flexibility in their constitution process, so their numbers are constantly changing. For example, there are now 470 districts, when in 2000, when the population census was conducted the districts were 463.

== Provincial organization ==
Politically and administratively, Costa Rica is made up of 7 provinces:

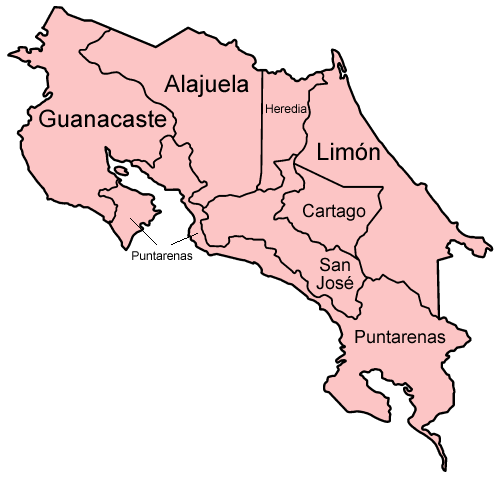

Provincias de Costa Rica
Province	ISO 3166-2	Capital	Cantons	Districts	Inhabitants	Area km^{2}
San José	CR-SJ	San José	20	123	1 404 242	4 965.90
Alajuela	CR-A	Alajuela	15	116	848 146	9 757.53
Cartago	CR-C	Cartago	8	51	490 903	3 124.67
Heredia	CR-H	Heredia	10	47	433 677	2 656.98
Guanacaste	CR-G	Liberia	11	61	326 953	10 140.71
Puntarenas	CR-P	Puntarenas	11	60	410 929	11 265.69
Limón	CR-L	Limón	6	30	386 862	9 176.96
		TOTALS	81	488	4 301 712	51 100

== Cantonal organization ==
The concept of City Hall or City Council falls to the second-level sub-national entity (the cantons), governed by a mayor elected every four years in general elections, as well as a Municipal Council (Municipal regime of Costa Rica). According to the Political Constitution, article 169:

"The administration of the local interests and services in each canton will be in charge of the Municipal Government, formed of a deliberative body, composed of municipal councilors of popular election, and of an executive officer who will designate the law."

== District organization ==
Each canton is divided into districts whose number varies from canton to canton. Each district has a District Council chaired by a syndic, all popularly elected. The District Council is the interlocutor between the district and the municipal government and ensures the communal and neighborhood interests before the Municipal Council, although the direct administration of the district falls to the municipality, the District Councils also exercise administrative functions such as forwarding projects To the Council and supervise the work of the mayor.

Each district in Costa Rica has a unique five digit administrate division code that is also used as an identifier by the National Institute of Statistics and Census of Costa Rica and corresponds to the postal code.

== Other subdivisions ==
According to the Administrative Territorial Division (Spanish: División Territorial Administrativa) the following subdivisions are applicable at or below canton and district level:

- Ciudad (city): Title awarded to the major urban area in the district which is the seat of the canton municipality. There are three special exceptions, in which more than one district composes a city in a canton:
  - San José city in its condition of Capital of the Republic, where each of the eleven districts of the San José canton are part of the city.
  - Cartago: The city corresponds to the union of Oriental and Occidental districts.
  - Puntarenas: The city is made up of the Puntarenas, Chacarita, El Roble districts.
- Capital de Provincia (Province capital): Is the city (as defined in this list) that has the condition of being located in the first canton of each of the provinces.
- Asentamiento (settlement): Group of homes in a rural zone, where their residents work on agricultural duties on farms facilitates by the government to fulfill economic and social objectives.
- Barrio (neighborhood): Group of homes generally located in a city, where their inhabitants share sociocultural activities and a sense of belonging with similar economic and social objectives.
- Caserío (hamlet): Disperse homes, usually in a rural setting, with some proximity and sharing a territory. A farm with at least eight homes are taken into account for this definition as long as their inhabitants recognize the name of the place.
- Localidad (locality): Any place that holds one or more structures used as homes, that can be inhabited, may be occupied or not. The place name might be officially or colloquially assigned.
- Poblado (village): A group of homes than can be disperse or lineally allocated, with buildings that cover basic services such as education, health, recreation and religious.

== Indigenous Territories ==
In Costa Rica there are 24 indigenous territories duly delimited by the central government and have limited autonomy. These territories are administered by the Associations of Indigenous Development like a local government according to Decree No. 13568-G of the Executive Power.
