= ISO 3166-2:MX =

Entry for Mexico in ISO 3166-2

ISO 3166-2:MX is the entry for Mexico in ISO 3166-2, part of the ISO 3166 standard published by the International Organization for Standardization (ISO), which defines codes for the names of the principal subdivisions (e.g., provinces or states) of all countries coded in ISO 3166-1.

Currently for Mexico, ISO 3166-2 codes are defined for federative entities including 31 states and Mexico City. Since an amendment of the Constitution of Mexico in 2016, Mexico City, the country's capital city, has been granted special status equal to a state.

Each code consists of two parts, separated by a hyphen. The first part is MX, the ISO 3166-1 alpha-2 code of Mexico. The second part is three letters.

== Current codes ==
Subdivision names are listed as in the ISO 3166-2 standard published by the ISO 3166 Maintenance Agency (ISO 3166/MA).

Click on the button in the header to sort each column.

Code	Subdivision name (es)	Local variant	Subdivision category
MX-AGU	Aguascalientes		state
MX-BCN	Baja California		state
MX-BCS	Baja California Sur		state
MX-CAM	Campeche		state
MX-CHP	Chiapas		state
MX-CHH	Chihuahua		state
MX-CMX	Ciudad de México		federal entity
MX-COA	Coahuila de Zaragoza	Coahuila	state
MX-COL	Colima		state
MX-DUR	Durango		state
MX-GUA	Guanajuato		state
MX-GRO	Guerrero		state
MX-HID	Hidalgo		state
MX-JAL	Jalisco		state
MX-MIC	Michoacán de Ocampo	Michoacán	state
MX-MOR	Morelos		state
MX-MEX	México		state
MX-NAY	Nayarit		state
MX-NLE	Nuevo León		state
MX-OAX	Oaxaca		state
MX-PUE	Puebla		state
MX-QUE	Querétaro		state
MX-ROO	Quintana Roo		state
MX-SLP	San Luis Potosí		state
MX-SIN	Sinaloa		state
MX-SON	Sonora		state
MX-TAB	Tabasco		state
MX-TAM	Tamaulipas		state
MX-TLA	Tlaxcala		state
MX-VER	Veracruz de Ignacio de la Llave	Veracruz	state
MX-YUC	Yucatán		state
MX-ZAC	Zacatecas		state

== See also ==
- Subdivisions of Mexico
- FIPS region codes of Mexico
- Neighbouring countries: BZ, GT, US
