= International rankings of Costa Rica =

This is a list of key international rankings of Costa Rica

== Economy ==
- World Economic Forum Global Competitiveness Report 2014-2015 ranked 51 out of 144

== Government ==
- Press Freedom Index 2017 ranked 6 out of 180
- Transparency International Corruption Perceptions Index 2016 ranked 41 out of 176

== Military ==
- Institute for Economics and Peace Global Peace Index 2014 ranked 42 out of 162

== Society ==
- Economist Intelligence Unit Where-to-be-born Index 2013 ranked 30 out of 80 countries and territories

== Technology ==
- World Intellectual Property Organization: Global Innovation Index 2026, ranked 70 out of 139 countries.

== Historical data ==
| Index (Year) | Author / Editor / Source | Year of publication | Countries sampled | World; Ranking ^{(1)} | Ranking in Latin America^{(2)} |
| Happy Planet Index (2.0) | New Economics Foundation | 2012 | 151 | 1 | 1 |
| Environmental Performance (2010) | Yale University | 2010 | 163 | 3 | 1 |
| Human Poverty, HPI-1 (2005)^{(3)} | United Nations (UNDP) | 2007-08 | 108 | 5 | 4 |
| Press Freedom (2020) | Reporters Without Borders | 2020 | 180 | 7 | 1 |
| Poverty below $2 a day (1990-2005)^{(4)} | United Nations (UNDP) | 2007-08 | 71 | 8 | 3 |
| Democracy (2019) | Economist Intelligence Unit | 2019 | 167 | 19 | 2 |
| Global Peace (2010) | Economist Intelligence Unit | 2010 | 149 | 26 | 2 |
| Quality-of-life (2013) | Economist Intelligence Unit | 2013 | 111 | 30 | 2 |
| Prosperity Index (2010) | Legatum Institute | 2010 | 110 | 33 | 3 |
| World's Best Countries (2008/09) | Newsweek | 2010 | 100 | 35 | 2 |
| Business Environment Rankings (2009) | Economist Intelligence Unit | 2009 | 82 | 40 | 4 |
| Corruption Perception (2010) | Transparency International | 2010 | 178 | 41 | 3 |
| Travel and Tourism Competitiveness (2019) | World Economic Forum | 2019 | 140 | 41 | 2 |
| Networked Readiness Index (2010-2011) (Global Information Technology Report) | World Economic Forum | 2011 | 138 | 46 | 3 |
| Economic Freedom (2010) | The Heritage Foundation/The Wall Street Journal | 2010 | 179 | 49 | 7 |
| Global Competitiveness (2011-2012) | World Economic Forum | 2011 | 142 | 61 | 5 |
| Human Development (2019) | United Nations (UNDP) | 2019 | 189 | 62 | 4 |
| Income inequality (1989-2007)^{(5)} | United Nations (UNDP) | 2007-2008 | 126 | 100 | 5 |
| Human Opportunity Index (1995-2005) ^{(6)} | World Bank | 2008 | 19 | N/A^{(6)} | 3 |
| Life Satisfaction Index (2006-2007) ^{(7)} | Inter-American Development Bank | 2008 | 24 | N/A^{(7)} | 1 |

^{(1)} Worldwide ranking among countries evaluated. See notes (3) and (4) also
^{(2)} Ranking among the 20 Latin American countries (Puerto Rico is not included).
^{(3)} Ranking among 108 developing countries with available data only.
^{(4)} Ranking among 71 developing countries with available data only. Countries in the sample surveyed between 1990-2005. Refers to population below income poverty line as define by the World Bank's $2 per day indicator
^{(5)} Because the Gini coefficient used for the ranking corresponds to different years depending on the country, and the underlying household surveys differ in method and in the type of data collected, the distribution data are not strictly comparable across countries. The ranking therefore is only a proxy for reference purposes.
^{(6)} The Human Opportunity Index study was performed by the World Bank among 19 countries in the Latin American and the Caribbean region, where statistics and census information is most reliable. Therefore, it is a regional index and there is no worldwide ranking available.
^{(7)} The Life Satisfaction Index study was performed by the Inter-American Development Bank among 24 countries in the Latin American and the Caribbean region, based on IDB calculations based on Gallup World Poll 2006 - 2007 and World Development Indicators. Therefore, it is a regional index.

== See also ==
- Lists of countries
- Lists by country
- List of international rankings
