= International rankings of Nicaragua =

The following are international rankings of the Nicaragua.

== Economic ==
- The Wall Street Journal: Index of Economic Freedom: 2006; 2007^{[unfit]}, ranked 61 out of 157 countries
- World Economic Forum: Global Competitiveness Report 2006-2007 Growth Competitiveness Index ranked 95 out of 125 countries
- GDP growth rate ranked 175 out of 215 2.5% growth rate (2006)
- Nominal GDP ranked 127 out of 183 (2005)
- Per capita GDP ranked 128 out of 194
- Unemployment rate ranked 40 of 197 with 3.9% unemployment (2008)
  - Third lowest in Central America
- World Bank Ease of Doing Business Index 2006: ranked 117 of 183 countries.
- 8(Previously ranked 67th in 2006)

== Environmental ==
- Yale University Center for Environmental Law and Policy and Columbia University Center for International Earth Science Information Network: Index of Environmental Sustainability Index 2005, ranked 66 out of 146 countries.
- United Nations: Carbon dioxide emissions 2006 ranked 119 out of 182 countries.
  - Third lowest in Latin America

== General ==
- United Nations: Human Development Index 2006, ranked 124 out of 177 countries
- Population (2009) ranked 107 out of 223 countries. 5,743,000 people, 0.084% of world's population (UN estimate.)

== Political ==
- Reporters Without Borders: Worldwide Press freedom Index 2006, ranked 69 out of 167 countries
    - Reporters Without Borders: Worldwide Press freedom Index 2007, ranked 47 out of 169 countries

== Technology ==
- World Intellectual Property Organization: Global Innovation Index 2026, ranked 124 out of 139 countries

== Other ==
Organization	Survey	Ranking
Institute for Economics and Peace	Global Peace Index	61 out of 144
United Nations Development Programme	Human Development Index	124 out of 182
Transparency International	Corruption Perceptions Index	130 out of 180
World Economic Forum	Global Competitiveness Report	115 out of 133
