= ISO 3166-2:NI =

Entry for Nicaragua in ISO 3166-2

ISO 3166-2:NI is the entry for Nicaragua in ISO 3166-2, part of the ISO 3166 standard published by the International Organization for Standardization (ISO), which defines codes for the names of the principal subdivisions (e.g., provinces or states) of all countries coded in ISO 3166-1.

Currently for Nicaragua, ISO 3166-2 codes are defined for 15 departments and two autonomous regions.

Each code consists of two parts separated by a hyphen. The first part is NI, the ISO 3166-1 alpha-2 code of Nicaragua. The second part is two letters.

== Current codes ==
Subdivision names are listed as in the ISO 3166-2 standard published by the ISO 3166 Maintenance Agency (ISO 3166/MA).

Click on the button in the header to sort each column.

| Code | Subdivision name (es) | Subdivision name (en) (Note: For reference only, English name not included in the ISO 3166-2 standard.) | Subdivision category |
|---|---|---|---|
| NI-BO | Boaco | Boaco | department |
| NI-CA | Carazo | Carazo | department |
| NI-CI | Chinandega | Chinandega | department |
| NI-CO | Chontales | Chontales | department |
| NI-AN | Costa Caribe Norte | North Caribbean Coast | autonomous region |
| NI-AS | Costa Caribe Sur | South Caribbean Coast | autonomous region |
| NI-ES | Estelí | Estelí | department |
| NI-GR | Granada | Granada | department |
| NI-JI | Jinotega | Jinotega | department |
| NI-LE | León | León | department |
| NI-MD | Madriz | Madriz | department |
| NI-MN | Managua | Managua | department |
| NI-MS | Masaya | Masaya | department |
| NI-MT | Matagalpa | Matagalpa | department |
| NI-NS | Nueva Segovia | New Segovia | department |
| NI-SJ | Río San Juan | Saint John River | department |
| NI-RI | Rivas | Rivas | department |

== Changes ==
The following changes to the entry have been announced by the ISO 3166/MA since the first publication of ISO 3166-2 in 1998. ISO stopped issuing newsletters in 2013.

| Source | Date issued | Description of change in newsletter | Code/Subdivision change |
|---|---|---|---|
| Newsletter I-2 | 2002-05-21 | Deletion of one department. Addition of two autonomous regions. New list source | Subdivisions added: NI-AN Atlántico Norte; NI-AS Atlántico Sur; Subdivisions deleted: NI-ZE Zelaya |
| Online Browsing Platform (OBP) | 2018-04-20 | Change of subdivision name of NI-AN, NI-AS; update List Source | Name change: NI-AN Atlántico Norte → Costa Caribe Norte; NI-AS Atlántico Sur → Costa Caribe Sur |

== See also ==
- Subdivisions of Nicaragua
- FIPS region codes of Nicaragua
- Neighbouring countries: CR, HN
