= ISO 3166-2:CR =

Entry for Costa Rica in ISO 3166-2

ISO 3166-2:CR is the entry for Costa Rica in ISO 3166-2, part of the ISO 3166 standard published by the International Organization for Standardization (ISO), which defines codes for the names of the principal subdivisions (e.g., provinces or states) of all countries coded in ISO 3166-1.

Currently for Costa Rica, ISO 3166-2 codes are defined for seven provinces.

Each code consists of two parts, separated by a hyphen. The first part is CR, the ISO 3166-1 alpha-2 code of Costa Rica. The second part is one or two letters.

== Current codes ==
Subdivision names are listed as in the ISO 3166-2 standard published by the ISO 3166 Maintenance Agency (ISO 3166/MA).

Code	Subdivision name (es)
CR-A	Alajuela
CR-C	Cartago
CR-G	Guanacaste
CR-H	Heredia
CR-L	Limón
CR-P	Puntarenas
CR-SJ	San José

== See also ==
- Subdivisions of Costa Rica
- FIPS region codes of Costa Rica
- Neighbouring countries: NI, PA
