= Sport in Belize =

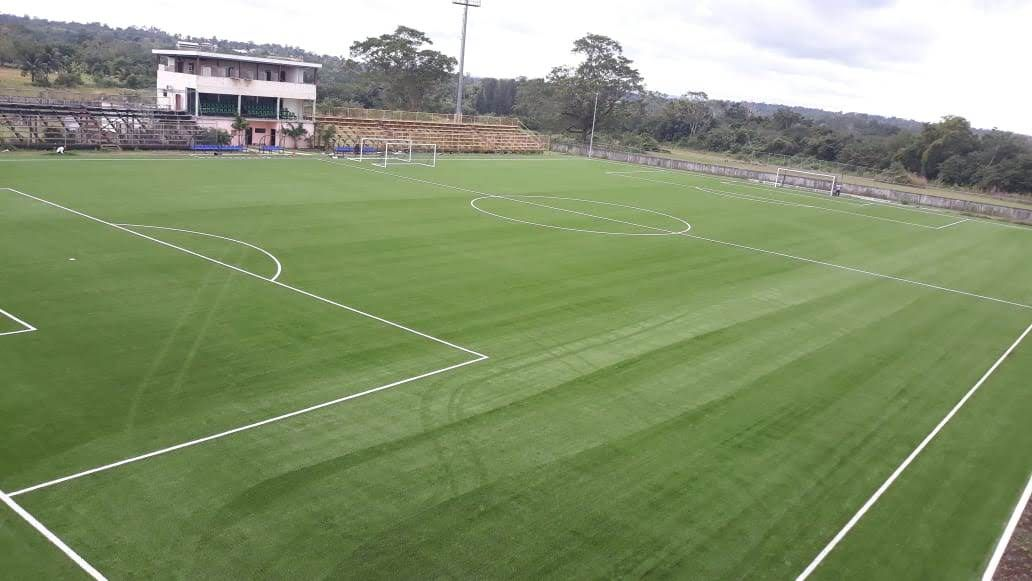
FFB-Field Belmopan, Belize

Sports have had an important role in Belizean culture. While Belize has never been an international sporting power, the nation's athletes have had some international success. Sports in the country are plagued by a lack of finance and sporting facilities, and there is little emphasis on sports as an integral part of national culture and pride. Nevertheless, sports continue to bring Belizeans together on and off the field.

Belize's National Sports Council oversees sports Belize, while the Olympic Committee oversees the country's Olympic Games delegations. Athletes from Belize first participated in the Olympic Games in 1968 while representing British Honduras.

Association football is the main spectator sport for Belizeans, but softball, basketball, volleyball, cricket, rugby, netball as well as track and field are popular. Belize also is well known for snorkeling and diving. Many sports engaged in by foreign visitors are related to water.

In 1995 the new National Stadium was opened in Belize City.

== Football ==
Football is currently the main spectator sport in Belize, and it is widely covered by the news industry.

Football's roots in Belize trace back to mid-20th century in amateur competitions, mostly held in Belize City. In 1991 Belize's first semi-professional league, the Belize Semiprofessional Football League, was formed with teams from all districts save Stann Creek and Toledo, who joined later. This league is now known as the Belize Premier Football League (BPFL). The overall governing body of football in Belize is the Football Federation of Belize (FFB) headed by Dr. Bertie Chimilio. While Belize has enjoyed some success at regional and club level, its international record is notoriously poor.

== Athletics ==
Track and Field in Belize is run by its Amateur Athletics Association. The main facility for track and field events in Belize is the Marion Jones Sports Complex (previously known as the National Stadium) on Margaret Drive in Belize City and named after the famous track and field star of Belizean descent. Plans have been made to renovate the track and move the stadium to an indoor one.

== Basketball ==
Basketball is governed by the Belize Basketball Federation (BBF), basketball's highest classification is semi-professional; the league (known as the Belize Basketball Association (BBA) was established in 1992). Matches are frequently held at the junior, senior amateur, high and primary school levels, and even the Mini tournament for little kids and Over-35 tournaments for retired players. There is a basketball court of some sort in every neighborhood and children can be seen practicing regularly.

Belize has held regional championships in the Caribbean (1998) and Central America (2001) but has not been to the Olympics. A number of Belizans, such as Nigel Miguel, Milt Palacio, Kenton Paulino and Charles Burgess, play or have played basketball at the college and NBA level in the United States. Paulino led the University of Texas to the 2005 Elite Eight; Burgess played for Texas Tech. Palacio graduated from Colorado State and played for several NBA teams, most recently the Utah Jazz; Miguel hails from UCLA and briefly tried out for the New Jersey Nets in the 1980s.

== Boxing ==
Boxing gained a niche in Belize in the 1930s, when weekend fight cards generally packed the premier boxing arena in Belize, Birds' Isle. Prominent Belizean boxers include lightweight Ludwig Lightburn and welterweight Fitzroy Guisseppi (originally of Trinidad and Jamaica). Verno Phillips is the only Belizean sportsperson to have held a world title, winning both the IBF and WBO junior middleweight titles. Rudolph Bent went on to fight internationally. Other Belizean boxers include Carlton Bowers, Samuel (Red Boy) Flowers, and Roy (Shorty) Clark. By the mid-1980s, boxing largely died out, and now only occasional amateur cards are held.

== Canoeing ==
The local association sponsors a number of races per year, including the La Ruta Maya Belize River Challenge, a 180-mile, four-day canoe race on the Belize River that starts in San Ignacio and ends in Belize City. The race occurs annually on Baron Bliss Day. The race promotes environmental awareness, while at the same time creates an intense competition for seasoned and amateur athletes alike.

== Cricket ==
Cricket is mainly played in the Belize Rural area, where local villages sponsor cricket teams. The national tournament is held in the Belize District from January to May. Belize's national cricket team played in Division Three of the ICC Americas Championship Bracket in 2008.

== Cycling ==
Cycling is popular in Central America, and it has a large following in Belize. Frequent races across the country exist.

Cycling takes place year round on the nation's highways. It is mainly amateur, but Belizeans have been placed well regionally. The most famous race is the Holy Saturday Cross Country Cycling Classic, held during the Easter weekend since 1928. Other famous races include the KREM New Years' Day Cycling Classic sponsored by KREM Radio, the National Road Championship, the Labor Day Classic and the World AIDS Day Classic held in honor of Alpheus Williams, former champion and victim of that disease.

== Softball ==
Softball's governing body for men and women is the Softball Federation. It is most popular in Belize and Cayo Districts and is gaining a following in the South. After local tournaments are complete a national champion is crowned and the teams prepare for next season. The local tournament usually includes competitors from various organizations, referred to as the interoffice competition.

Softball has traditionally enjoyed the most success abroad for Belize. Teams have routinely won medals in regional competitions in both Central America and the Caribbean.

== Tennis ==
The Belize Tennis Association (BTA) is the nationally recognized body responsible for overseeing the development of tennis in Belize. In 1991, Belize via the Belize Tennis Association became a member of the International Tennis Federation. However, it was not until 2011 that the BTA gained legal status by registering with the Belize Companies Registry and became incorporated as a non-profit association.
