= Cancuén =

Archaeological site of the pre-Columbian Maya civilization

Coordinates: 16°00′47.01″N 90°2′25.23″W

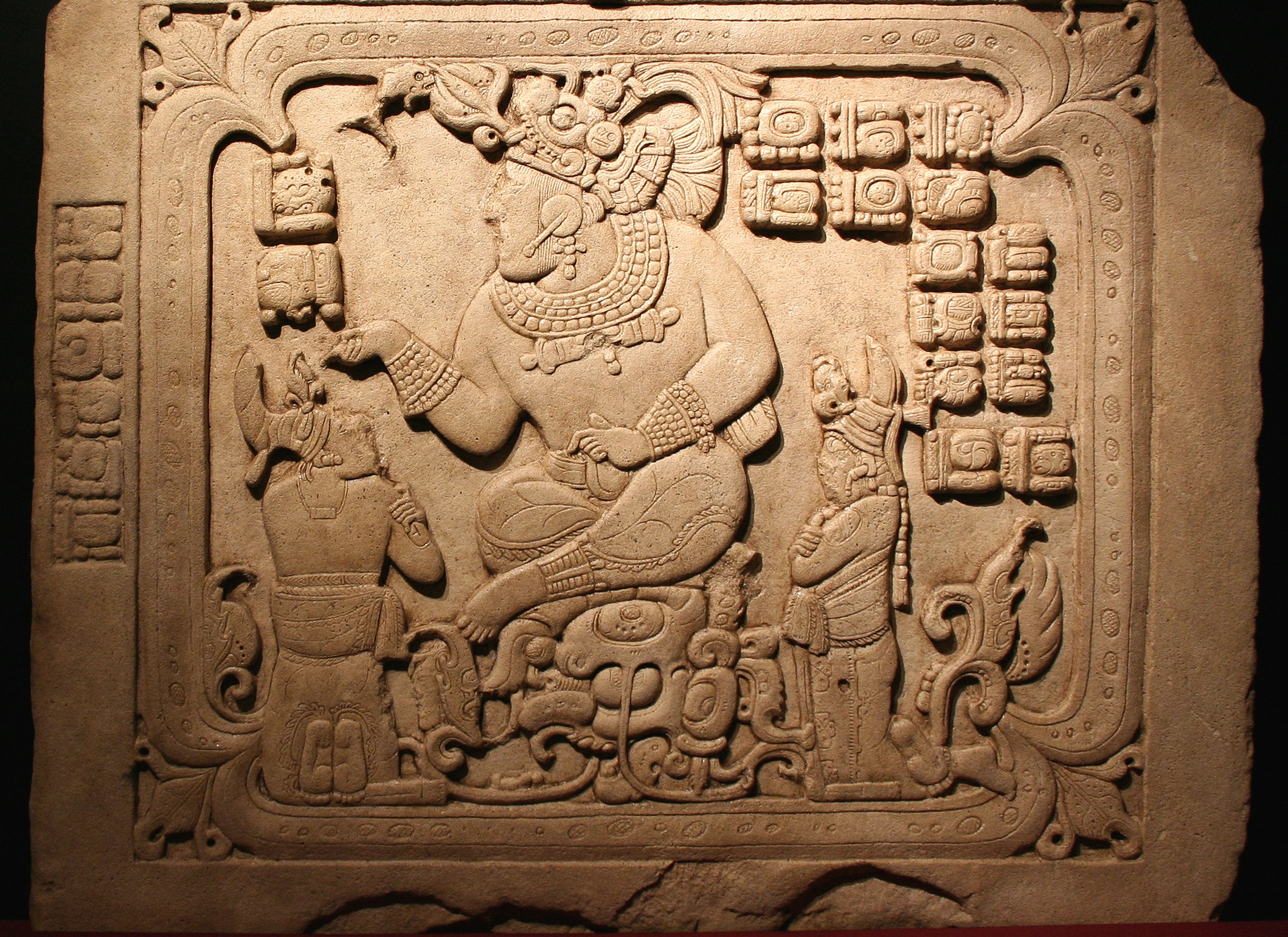
Panel 3 from Cancuén portraying the ruler Tajal Chan Ahk

Cancuén is an archaeological site of the pre-Columbian Maya civilization, located in the Pasión subregion of the central Maya lowlands in the present-day Guatemalan Department of Petén. The city is notable for having one of the largest palaces in the Maya world.

== Ancient Cancuén ==
Cancuén was a major city during the Classic Period, reaching its peak during the 7th century. The city was a major trade center, specializing in jade, pyrite and obsidian. Its strategic position on the river Pasion helped it dominate trade in the region. Tajal Chan Ahk, one of the city's most powerful rulers, built the city's palace in 770 AD. The palace covered nearly 23,000 square meters and contained 200 rooms, making it the largest in the Maya area. The city had two ball courts, a large marketplace and a dock on La Pasión River. The city does not contain many large temples or burial sites; it is thought that the inhabitants of Cancuén worshipped and buried their dead in the mountains near the city.

=== Massacre around 800 AD ===
Several dozen bodies dressed in royal garments were discovered near the base of the central pyramid. Investigations have shown that the bodies, including the city's ruler at the time, Kan Maax, had been executed and dumped in a cistern. The massacre occurred around 800 AD, the time when the Mayan civilization collapsed, leading some scholars to believe that it was connected to the upheaval that accompanied the collapse of the Maya civilization.

=== Abandonment of Cancuén ===
Cancuén is thought to have been abandoned shortly after the massacre event around 800 AD, and was subsequently not re-occupied.

== Excavation ==
The site was rediscovered in 1905 by Austrian explorer Teoberto Maler. No major temples or burial sites were reported in the initial investigations, leading archaeologists to believe it had been a minor or subsidiary site. Cancuén was largely ignored until 1967, when students from Harvard University uncovered the ruins of the largest Palace in the Maya world. Its walls are up to 1.8m thick and, with more than 200 rooms and 12 patios, it has more than 200,000-square-foot (19,000 m^{2}). Further investigations showed that the size of the structure and the entire site had previously been underestimated; it is now thought that a "maze of hundreds of rooms with 20-foot-high, arched ceilings" covered at least 3 square miles (7.8 km^{2}). Subsequent archaeological expeditions were launched following the discovery of the palace, including teams from Vanderbilt University and the Universidad del Valle de Guatemala. The National Geographic Society is also connected to the excavations.

== Known persons ==
| Name | Notes |
|---|---|
| K'inich K'ap K'ayal Ahk | Ruler who died in 653 |
| K'iib' Ajaw | Ruler who ascended in 656 |
| Chan Ahk Wi' Taak Chay | Ruler who ascended in 677 |
| GI-K'awiil | Wife of the king Ucha'an K'in B'alam of Dos Pilas |
| Tajal Chan Ahk | King who ruled 757 – c. 799 |
| Kan Maax | Last ruler of Cancuén |

== See also ==
- Last Days of the Maya
