= ISO 3166-2:GT =

Entry for Guatemala in ISO 3166-2

ISO 3166-2:GT is the entry for Guatemala in ISO 3166-2, part of the ISO 3166 standard published by the International Organization for Standardization (ISO), which defines codes for the names of the principal subdivisions (e.g., provinces or states) of all countries coded in ISO 3166-1.

Currently for Guatemala, ISO 3166-2 codes are defined for 22 departments.

Each code consists of two parts, separated by a hyphen. The first part is GT, the ISO 3166-1 alpha-2 code of Guatemala. The second part is two digits.

== Current codes ==
Subdivision names are listed as in the ISO 3166-2 standard published by the ISO 3166 Maintenance Agency (ISO 3166/MA).

Click on the button in the header to sort each column.

Code	Subdivision name (es)	Subdivision name (en) (Note: For reference only, English name not included in the ISO 3166-2 standard.)
GT-16	Alta Verapaz	Upper Verapaz
GT-15	Baja Verapaz	Lower Verapaz
GT-04	Chimaltenango	Chimaltenango
GT-20	Chiquimula	Chiquimula
GT-02	El Progreso	El Progreso
GT-05	Escuintla	Escuintla
GT-01	Guatemala	Guatemala
GT-13	Huehuetenango	Huehuetenango
GT-18	Izabal	Izabal
GT-21	Jalapa	Jalapa
GT-22	Jutiapa	Jutiapa
GT-17	Petén	Petén
GT-09	Quetzaltenango	Quetzaltenango
GT-14	Quiché	Quiché
GT-11	Retalhuleu	Retalhuleu
GT-03	Sacatepéquez	Sacatepéquez
GT-12	San Marcos	Saint Mark
GT-06	Santa Rosa	Saint Rose
GT-07	Sololá	Sololá
GT-10	Suchitepéquez	Suchitepéquez
GT-08	Totonicapán	Totonicapán
GT-19	Zacapa	Zacapa

== Changes ==
The following changes to the entry have been announced by the ISO 3166/MA since the first publication of ISO 3166-2 in 1998. ISO stopped issuing newsletters in 2013.

Newsletter	Date issued	Description of change in newsletter
Newsletter I-2	2002-05-21	Spelling correction in GT-QZ
Online Browsing; Platform (OBP)	2021-11-25	Change of subdivision code from GT-AV to GT-16, GT-BV to GT-15, GT-CM to GT-04, GT-CQ to GT-20, GT-ES to GT-05, GT-GU to GT-01, GT-HU to GT-13, GT-IZ to GT-18, GT-JA to GT-21, GT-JU to GT-22, GT-PE to GT-17, GT-PR to GT-02, GT-QC to GT-14, GT-QZ to GT-09, GT-RE to GT-11, GT-SA to GT-03, GT-SM to GT-12, GT-SO to GT-07, GT-SR to GT-06, GT-SU to GT-10, GT-TO to GT-08, GT-ZA to GT-19; Update Code Source

== See also ==
- Subdivisions of Guatemala
- FIPS region codes of Guatemala
- Neighbouring countries: BZ, HN, MX, SV
