= ISO 3166-2:BZ =

Entry for Belize in ISO 3166-2

ISO 3166-2:BZ is the entry for Belize in ISO 3166-2, part of the ISO 3166 standard published by the International Organization for Standardization (ISO), which defines codes for the names of the principal subdivisions (e.g., provinces or states) of all countries coded in ISO 3166-1.

Currently for Belize, ISO 3166-2 codes are defined for six districts.

Each code consists of two parts, separated by a hyphen. The first part is BZ, the ISO 3166-1 alpha-2 code of Belize. The second part is two or three letters.

== Current codes ==
Subdivision names are listed as in the ISO 3166-2 standard published by the ISO 3166 Maintenance Agency (ISO 3166/MA).

Click on the button in the header to sort each column.

Code	Subdivision name (en)
BZ-BZ	Belize
BZ-CY	Cayo
BZ-CZL	Corozal
BZ-OW	Orange Walk
BZ-SC	Stann Creek
BZ-TOL	Toledo

== See also ==
- Subdivisions of Belize
- FIPS region codes of Belize
- Neighbouring countries: GT, MX
