= Kan Maax =

- Ajaw

Ajaw
- Reign: c. 800
- Predecessor: Tajal Chan Ahk
- Born: Cancuén
- Died: Cancuén
- Father: Tajal Chan Ahk
- Religion: Maya religion

Kan Maax (fl. 800CE), alternatively transliterated as K'an Maax, has been identified as the last known ruler of Cancuén, a pre-Columbian Maya realm located at the headwaters of the Pasion River in modern-day Guatemala. He was the son of Tajal Chan Ahk.

== History ==
According to a tomb found in Cancuén, Kan Maax was between 20 and 40 years old when his father, Tajal Chan Ahk, died, which is believed to be sometime around 799.

In a Mesoamerican ballcourt marker, dated to 795 or 796, Kan Maax is depicted with his father.

As with Tajal Chan Ahk, Kan Maax was believed to be a water lord, being depicted with water symbols such as water lilies.

On 17 November 2005, National Geographic, Vanderbilt University and the Guatemalan Ministry of Culture jointly announced a discovery which was identified as a mass grave containing 31 Mayan nobles, as well as nearby graves for Kan Maax and his queen. The grave was dated to about 800. Remains found in both graves showed signs of spear or axe wounds. Kan Maax was buried in full regalia, which enabled his identification, as he was wearing a necklace bearing his name and title in Maya glyphs. It was noted that the mass burial was unusual, as the bodies were treated with respect, being buried with their valuables rather than stripped of them during looting. The grave also included obsidian cores and flakes.
