= 2001 El Salvador earthquake =

2001 El Salvador earthquake may refer to:

- January 2001 El Salvador earthquake (7.7 M_{w}), struck 60 miles (100 km) southwest of San Miguel
- February 2001 El Salvador earthquake (6.6 M_{w}), struck 15 miles (30 km) east of San Salvador

== See also ==
- List of earthquakes in 2001
- List of earthquakes in El Salvador
