= Tajal Chan Ahk =

- Ajaw
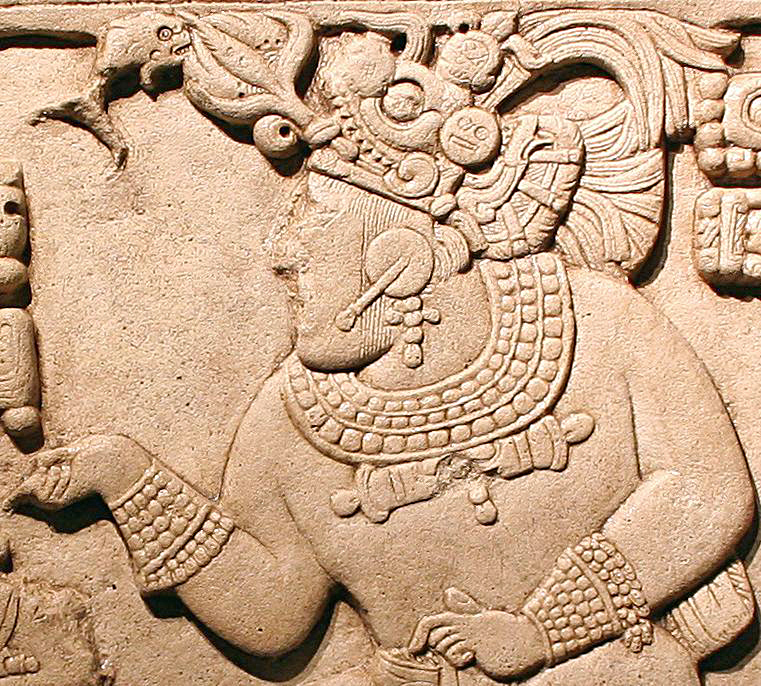
- Detail of the portrait of the ruler, on Panel 3

King of Cancuén
- Reign: 22 October 757–799
- Successor: Kan Maax
- Born: 12 April 742; Cancuén
- Died: 799 (aged 56–57); Cancuén
- Issue: Kan Maax
- Religion: Maya religion

Tajal Chan Ahk (742-799) was an 8th-century ruler of the Maya city Cancuén, whose rule lasted from 757 to c. 799. He ruled during the Classic Maya collapse.

== History ==
The Classic Maya collapse, the era in which Tajal Chan Ahk ruled, has been characterized as one of endemic warfare, which led to the destruction of population centers. Public construction ceased entirely, while by 830 the population fell to less than 10% of what it had been before.

Despite this, many notable monuments were constructed under his reign, such as the palace of Cancuén. A Mesoamerican ballcourt marker was constructed in January 796. However, two of his sublords are depicted in the marker, rather than Tajal Chan Ahk himself. A second ballcourt marker depicts Tajal Chan Akh with his son, Kan Maax.

He was depicted as a water lord, including water symbols such as water lilies. This may be related to Cancuén's position as a river port city. His headdress was depicted with a sky sign and a turtle head as a means of spelling his name.

It's not clear when Tajal Chan Ahk died, but an inscription found in a museum in Cobán states that he was still alive as of 799.

== Issue ==
Tajal Chan Akh had at least one son, Kan Maax.
