= List of island countries =

Map depicts sovereign states and a de facto state (Taiwan) (tw) fully located on islands: those with land borders shaded green, and those without shaded dark blue. Countries/territories not shown on the map: Antarctica (aq) (continental disputed territory), Australia (au) (continental country), the Cook Islands (ck) and Niue (nu) (free association with New Zealand), Greenland (gl) and the Faroe Islands (fo) (constituent countries of the Kingdom of Denmark), Northern Cyprus (ct.tr and nc.tr) (unrecognized country), and Puerto Rico (pr) (unincorporated U.S. territory).

An island is a landmass (smaller than a continent) that is surrounded by water. Many island countries are spread over an archipelago, as is the case with Indonesia, Japan, and the Philippines—these countries consist of thousands of islands. Others consist of a single island, such as Barbados, Dominica, and Nauru; a main island and some smaller islands, such as Cuba, Iceland, and Sri Lanka; a part of an island, such as Brunei, the Dominican Republic, Timor-Leste, and the Republic of Ireland; or one main island but also sharing borders in other islands, such as the United Kingdom (Great Britain and a part of Ireland).

The list also includes two states in free association with New Zealand, the Cook Islands and Niue, as well as two states with limited diplomatic recognition which have de facto control over territories entirely on the islands, Northern Cyprus and Taiwan. In total, 50 island countries have been included in the lists.

Australia is not included as it is considered a continental country, although it was historically referred to as an island country because of its lack of land borders. Greenland is generally considered as the largest island on Earth and listed among the island territories. Puerto Rico in the Caribbean Sea is officially an unincorporated territory of the United States. Neither Greenland nor Puerto Rico are sovereign countries.

Indonesia is the world's largest island country by area (1,904,569 km^{2}), and by total number of islands (17,504 islands). It is also the world's most populous island country, with a population of over 270 million (the fourth most populous country in the world, after India, China, and the United States).

South America has only one independent sovereign island nation with Trinidad and Tobago; though considered a Caribbean island country, it is located on the northern portion of the South American continental shelf just 11 kilometres (6 nautical miles) off Venezuela, but 130 kilometres (70 nautical miles) from Grenada, the nearest of the Antilles. (Note: The Falkland Islands and South Georgia and the South Sandwich Islands are disputed island territories administered by the United Kingdom and claimed by Argentina.)

== Sovereign states ==
=== UN member states and states with limited recognition ===
| Name | ISO code | Geographic configuration | Geologic location | Area | | Population | Population density | | Geographical location | Establishment/ Independence |
| Name | ISO code | Geographic configuration | Geologic location | km^{2} | sq mi | Population | per km^{2} | per sq mi | Geographical location | Establishment/ Independence |
UN member states
| Antigua and Barbuda | AG; ATG | Two main islands: Antigua Island; Barbuda Island | Oceanic | 442 | 171 | 97,120 | 220 | 570 | Caribbean Sea, Lesser Antilles | 1981 November 1 |
| Bahamas | BS; BHS | Archipelago | Various | 13,939 | 5,382 | 389,480 | 28 | 73 | Atlantic Ocean, Lucayan Archipelago | 1973 July 10 |
| Bahrain | BH; BHR | Archipelago with one main island | Continental shelf | 778 | 300 | 1,641,170 | 2,109 | 5,460 | Persian Gulf | 1971 December 10 |
| Barbados | BB; BRB | One main island | Oceanic | 430 | 170 | 287,020 | 667 | 1,730 | Caribbean Sea, Lesser Antilles | 1966 November 30 |
| Brunei | BN; BRN | Part of a larger island (Borneo) | Continental shelf | 5,765 | 2,226 | 433,290 | 75 | 190 | Maritime Southeast Asia | 1984 January 1 |
| Cape Verde | CV; CPV | Archipelago | Oceanic | 4,033 | 1,557 | 549,930 | 136 | 350 | Atlantic Ocean, Macaronesia | 1975 July 5 |
| Comoros | KM; COM | Archipelago | Oceanic | 1,861 | 719 | 850,890 | 457 | 1,180 | Indian Ocean, Africa, Comoros Islands | 1975 July 6 |
| Cuba | CU; CUB | One main island, and several smaller islands (Isla de la Juventud, etc.) | Various | 109,884 | 42,426 | 11,346,346 | 103 | 270 | Caribbean Sea, Greater Antilles | 1868 October 10 1902 May 20 |
| Cyprus (Note: The northern part of the island of Cyprus is the de facto independent state of Northern Cyprus, which is recognized only by Turkey. In the south of the island are the Sovereign Base Areas of Akrotiri and Dhekelia, controlled by the United Kingdom.) | CY; CYP | Part of a larger island | Continental shelf | 9,251 | 3,572 | 888,005 | 96 | 250 | Mediterranean Sea | 1960 August 16 |
| Dominica | DM; DMA | One main island | Oceanic | 754 | 291 | 71,810 | 95 | 250 | Caribbean Sea, Lesser Antilles | 1978 November 3 |
| Dominican Republic | DO; DOM | Part of a larger island (Hispaniola), and several smaller islands (Alto Velo, Catalina, Saona, Beata, etc.) | Oceanic | 48,671 | 18,792 | 10,738,960 | 221 | 570 | Caribbean Sea, Greater Antilles | 1821 December 1 1844 February 27 |
| Timor-Leste | TL; TLS | Part of a larger island (Timor) | Oceanic | 14,919 | 5,760 | 1,293,120 | 87 | 230 | Maritime Southeast Asia, Lesser Sunda Islands | 2002 May 20 |
| Fiji | FJ; FJI | Archipelago with two main islands: Viti Levu; Vanua Levu | Oceanic | 18,274 | 7,056 | 889,950 | 49 | 130 | Pacific Ocean, Melanesia | 1970 October 10 |
| Grenada | GD; GRD | One main island with two island dependencies (Carriacou and Petite Martinique) | Oceanic | 344 | 133 | 112,000 | 326 | 840 | Caribbean Sea, Lesser Antilles | 1974 February 7 |
| Haiti | HT; HTI | Part of a larger island (Hispaniola), and several smaller islands (Gonâve, Tortuga, Les Cayemites, etc.) | Oceanic | 27,750 | 10,710 | 11,743,017 | 423 | 1,100 | Caribbean Sea, Greater Antilles | 1804 January 1 |
| Iceland | IS; ISL | One main island | Various (Note: The largest oceanic island in the world.) | 102,775 | 39,682 | 361,310 | 4 | 10 | Atlantic Ocean, Arctic Circle | 1918 December 1; 1944 June 17 |
| Indonesia | ID; IDN | Archipelago, including parts of larger islands (Borneo, New Guinea, Sebatik, and Timor) | Various (Note: The western portion of the country is on the continental shelf of Asia while the eastern portion of the country is on the continental shelf of Australia. The central portion of the country consists of oceanic islands in Wallacea.) | 1,904,569 | 735,358 | 270,625,570 | 142 | 370 | Maritime Southeast Asia, Indian and Pacific oceans | 1945 August 17 |
| Ireland | IE; IRL | Part of a larger island (Ireland), and several smaller islands | Continental shelf | 70,273 | 27,133 | 4,977,400 | 71 | 180 | Atlantic Ocean, British Isles | 1922 December 6 |
| Jamaica | JM; JAM | One main island with an archipelago of islets (inc. Morant Cays, Pedro Cays, and Port Royal Cays) | Various | 10,991 | 4,244 | 2,734,092 | 249 | 640 | Caribbean Sea, Greater Antilles | 1962 August 6 |
| Japan | JP; JPN | Four main islands and thousands of surrounding islands | Continental shelf | 377,976 | 145,937 | 126,264,930 | 334 | 870 | Pacific Ocean, East Asia | 660 BC February 11 (Note: In Japanese tradition, 11 February 660 BC is regarded as the accession date of the first Emperor of Japan in legendary, Emperor Jimmu, marking the establishment of the imperial dynasty. However, no historical evidence that Jimmu actually existed and his story was largely narrated by Japanese mythology. February 11 was also the day when the Constitution of the Empire of Japan was proclaimed in 1889. See: National Foundation Day) |
| Kiribati | KI; KIR | Several separated archipelagos | Oceanic | 811 | 313 | 117,610 | 145 | 380 | Pacific Ocean, Micronesia | 1979 July 12 |
| Madagascar | MG; MDG | One main island | Continental shelf (Note: The largest microcontinent in the world.) | 587,041 | 226,658 | 26,969,310 | 46 | 120 | Indian Ocean, Africa | 1960 June 26 |
| Maldives | MV; MDV | Archipelago | Oceanic | 298 | 115 | 383,976 | 1,289 | 3,340 | Indian Ocean, Laccadive Sea | 1965 July 26 |
| Malta | MT; MLT | Two main islands (Malta Island and Gozo) plus other smaller islands | Continental shelf | 316 | 122 | 502,650 | 1,591 | 4,120 | Mediterranean Sea | 1964 September 21 |
| Marshall Islands (Note: The Federated States of Micronesia, the Marshall Islands, and Palau are states in free association with the United States, under the Compact of Free Association.) | MH; MHL | Two archipelagos | Oceanic | 181 | 70 | 58,790 | 325 | 840 | Pacific Ocean, Micronesia | 1979 May 1 |
| Mauritius | MU; MUS | Archipelago with one main island | Oceanic | 2,040 | 790 | 1,265,710 | 620 | 1,600 | Indian Ocean, Africa, Mascarene Islands | 1968 March 12 |
| Micronesia | FM; FSM | Archipelago | Oceanic | 702 | 271 | 113,810 | 162 | 420 | Pacific Ocean, Micronesia | 1979 May 10 |
| Nauru | NR; NRO | One main island | Oceanic | 21 | 8.1 | 12,580 | 599 | 1,550 | Pacific Ocean, Micronesia | 1968 January 31 |
| New Zealand | NZ; NZL | An archipelago around two main islands: Te Ika-a-Māui (the North Island); Te Waipounamu (the South Island) | Continental shelf (Note: A part of the submerged continent of Zealandia.) | 270,467 | 104,428 | 5,125,451 | 19 | 49 | Pacific Ocean, Polynesia | 1907 September 26 |
| Palau | PW; PLW | Archipelago | Oceanic | 459 | 177 | 18,010 | 39 | 100 | Pacific Ocean, Micronesia | 1981 January 1 |
| Papua New Guinea | PG; PNG | Part of a larger island (New Guinea), and surrounding archipelago | Continental shelf | 462,840 | 178,700 | 8,776,110 | 19 | 49 | Pacific Ocean, Melanesia | 1975 September 16 |
| Philippines | PH; PHL | Archipelago | Various | 300,000 | 120,000 | 108,116,620 | 360 | 930 | Maritime Southeast Asia | 1898 June 12 1946 July 4 |
| Saint Kitts and Nevis | KN; KNA | Two main islands: Saint Christopher Island; Nevis Island | Oceanic | 261 | 101 | 52,830 | 202 | 520 | Caribbean Sea, Lesser Antilles | 1983 September 19 |
| Saint Lucia | LC; LCA | One main island | Oceanic | 616 | 238 | 182,790 | 297 | 770 | Caribbean Sea, Lesser Antilles | 1979 February 22 |
| Saint Vincent and the Grenadines | VC; VCT | An archipelago with one main island | Oceanic | 389 | 150 | 110,590 | 284 | 740 | Caribbean Sea, Lesser Antilles | 1979 October 27 |
| Samoa | WS; WSM | Archipelago | Oceanic | 2,842 | 1,097 | 197,100 | 69 | 180 | Pacific Ocean, Polynesia | 1962 January 1 |
| São Tomé and Príncipe | ST; STP | Two main islands: São Tomé Island; Príncipe Island) | Oceanic | 1,001 | 386 | 215,060 | 215 | 560 | Atlantic Ocean, Gulf of Guinea, Africa | 1975 July 12 |
| Seychelles | SC; SYC | Archipelago | Various (Note: The Granitic Seychelles is a part of the Seychelles microcontinent. The Coralline Seychelles consists of oceanic islands.) | 455 | 176 | 97,630 | 215 | 560 | Indian Ocean, Africa | 1976 June 29 |
| Singapore | SG; SGP | An archipelago with one main island | Continental shelf | 728 | 281 | 5,703,570 | 7,831 | 20,280 | Maritime Southeast Asia | 1965 August 9 |
| Solomon Islands | SB; SLB | Archipelago | Oceanic | 28,400 | 11,000 | 669,820 | 24 | 62 | Pacific Ocean, Melanesia | 1978 July 7 |
| Sri Lanka | LK; LKA | One main island, plus other small islands | Continental shelf | 65,610 | 25,330 | 21,803,000 | 332 | 860 | Indian Ocean, South Asia | 1948 February 4 |
| Tonga | TO; TON | Archipelago | Oceanic | 748 | 289 | 104,490 | 140 | 360 | Pacific Ocean, Polynesia | 1970 June 4 |
| Trinidad and Tobago | TT; TTO | An archipelago with two main islands: Trinidad Island; Tobago Island | Various | 5,131 | 1,981 | 1,394,970 | 272 | 700 | Caribbean Sea, Lesser Antilles | 1962 August 31 |
| Tuvalu | TV; TUV | Archipelago | Oceanic | 26 | 10 | 11,650 | 448 | 1,160 | Pacific Ocean, Polynesia | 1978 October 1 |
| United Kingdom (Note: The British Overseas Territory of Gibraltar is a peninsular exclave which shares a land border with Spain and can thus be regarded as a part of continental Europe, with the United Kingdom retaining the full authority for its defence and foreign relations. However, Gibraltar and other BOTs are considered to be dependent territories of the British Crown with varying degrees of self-governance, not parts of the United Kingdom proper nor of any of its four constituent countries.) | GB or UK; GBR | One main island, part of second island (Ireland), plus several archipelagos | Continental shelf | 244,820 | 94,530 | 67,886,004 | 277 | 720 | Atlantic Ocean, British Isles | 1707 May 1 |
| Vanuatu | VU; VUT | Archipelago | Oceanic | 12,189 | 4,706 | 299,880 | 25 | 65 | Pacific Ocean, Melanesia | 1980 July 30 |
States with limited recognition
| Northern Cyprus (Note: In 1983, in a breach of international law, Northern Cyprus unilaterally declared independence from Cyprus, with direct support of its neighbour Turkey, in support of the Turkish people minority on the island. Northern Cyprus's sovereignty has been recognized by only one United Nations member state: Turkey. It retains a de facto control of this part of the island. It is not a member state of the United Nations. Most states recognize Cyprus's claim to sovereignty over the entirety of the island of Cyprus.) | CY; CYP | Part of a larger island (Cyprus) | Continental shelf | 3,355 | 1,295 | 313,626 | 93 | 240 | Mediterranean Sea | 1974 July 20 (unlawful usurpation of Cypriot rule by Turkish minority) |
| Taiwan (Note: Since the conclusion of the Chinese Civil War, the Republic of China (ROC) retains actual rule over the islands of Taiwan, Penghu, Kinmen, Matsu, and other minor islands, all of which are collectively known as the "Free Area" (or Taiwan Area) in contrast to Mainland China being under communist rule, thus making it a de facto island nation, and has become known colloquially as simply "Taiwan" due to the island of Taiwan forming the majority of the ROC-controlled territories; nonetheless, the ROC has not officially renounced its constitutional-defined territories which include areas effectively controlled by the People's Republic of China, Mongolia, Tuva (a Russian republic) etc. If claimed territories were taken into account, the ROC would not be an island country, nor a country centred around a major island. The ROC-controlled territories are also claimed by the People's Republic of China. See: Cross-Strait relations, One China, Political status of Taiwan, and Two Chinas.) | TW; TWN | One main island and several smaller islands | Continental shelf | 36,193 | 13,974 | 23,603,121 | 652 | 1,690 | Pacific Ocean, East Asia | 1912 January 1; 1949 December 7 (Note: The Republic of China (ROC) was formally established on 1 January 1912 following the Xinhai Revolution, which succeeded the former Qing dynasty's territories on Mainland China, while the islands of Taiwan and Penghu were under Japanese rule at the time. The ROC gained control over the latter after the Surrender of Japan in 1945, but soon lost its control of mainland to the communists due to the Chinese Civil War. The ROC government relocated to Taipei on 7 December 1949 and named the city its provisional capital. Constitutionally, the Republic of China on Taiwan still views itself as the continuation of the former Chinese republic, with legitimate sovereignty over Mainland China despite having no actual control. 7 December 1949 is listed as the date of formation of its governing authority fully established on the islands. See: Four-Stage Theory of the Republic of China, Kuomintang's retreat to Taiwan, and Political status of Taiwan.) |

=== Associated states ===
| Name | ISO code | Geographic configuration | Geologic location | Associated with | Area | | Population | Density | | Geographical location |
| Name | ISO code | Geographic configuration | Geologic location | Associated with | km^{2} | sq mi | Population | per km^{2} | per sq mi | Geographical location |
|---|---|---|---|---|---|---|---|---|---|---|
| Cook Islands (Note: The political status of the Cook Islands and Niue is defined as states in free association with New Zealand. The Cook Islands and Niue are internally self-governing, with New Zealand retaining responsibility for their defence and for some foreign affairs. However, these responsibilities confer New Zealand no rights of control and can only be exercised at the request of the Cook Islands and Niue. See: Constitution of the Cook Islands and Niue Constitution Act.) | CK; COK | Two archipelagos | Oceanic | New Zealand | 236 | 91 | 10,777 | 45.7 | 118 | Pacific Ocean, Polynesia |
| Niue | NU; NIU | One island | Oceanic | New Zealand | 260 | 100 | 1,269 | 4.9 | 13 | Pacific Ocean, Polynesia |

== Dependencies and territories ==
| Name | ISO code | Geographic configuration | Geologic location | Sovereign state | Area | | Population | Density | | Geographic location |
| Name | ISO code | Geographic configuration | Geologic location | Sovereign state | km^{2} | sq mi | Population | per km^{2} | per sq mi | Geographic location |
|---|---|---|---|---|---|---|---|---|---|---|
| Åland | AX; AXL | Archipelago (Note: Finland and Sweden share a border over the small island of Märket; however, the property including the lighthouse is owned by the Finnish rather than Åland government.) | Continental shelf | Finland | 1,580 | 610 | 28,355 | 17.9 | 46 | Baltic Sea, Gulf of Bothnia |
| American Samoa (Note: An insular area of the United States. See Territories of the United States.) | AS; ASM | Archipelago | Oceanic | United States | 199 | 77 | 54,947 | 276 | 710 | Pacific Ocean, Polynesia |
| Andaman and Nicobar Islands | IN; IND | Two neighbouring archipelagos of the Andaman Islands and Nicobar Islands | Continental shelf | India | 8,249 | 3,185 | 380,520 | 46 | 120 | Bay of Bengal, Andaman Sea |
| Anguilla | AI; AIA | One main island | Oceanic | United Kingdom | 91 | 35 | 15,423 | 169 | 440 | Caribbean Sea, Lesser Antilles |
| Aruba | AW; ABW | One main island | Continental shelf | Netherlands | 180 | 69 | 107,635 | 598 | 1,550 | Caribbean Sea, Lesser Antilles |
| Bermuda | BM; BMU | Archipelago | Oceanic | United Kingdom | 53.3 | 20.6 | 62,500 | 1,170 | 3,000 | Atlantic Ocean, North America |
| Bouvet Island | BV; BVT | One island | Oceanic | Norway | 49 | 19 | No permanent resident | 0 | 0 | Southern Ocean |
| British Indian Ocean Territory (Note: Since 2024, the Chagos Archipelago sovereignty dispute is approaching a resolution with the return of the British Indian Ocean Territory to Mauritius — deemed to have the right of sovereignty over the isles by ruling from both the United Nations General Assembly (UNGA) the International Court of Justice (ICJ) — with the United Kingdom retaining control of the airbase on Diego Garcia on the basis of a 99-year lease. The negotiations as to the details of the return and the cost of the lease and the rate of compensation are yet to be determined.) | IO; IOT | Archipelago (The Chagos Archipelago) | Oceanic | United Kingdom Mauritius | 60 | 23 | 3,000 | 50 | 130 | Indian Ocean |
| British Virgin Islands | VG; VGB | Archipelago | Oceanic | United Kingdom | 151 | 58 | 31,148 | 206 | 530 | Caribbean Sea, Lesser Antilles |
| Caribbean Netherlands | BQ; BES | Three separate main islands: Bonaire; Sint Eustatius; Saba | Various | Netherlands | 127 | 49 | 21,133 | 166 | 430 | Caribbean Sea |
| Cayman Islands | KY; CYM | Three main islands | Oceanic | United Kingdom | 264 | 102 | 52,560 | 199 | 520 | Caribbean Sea, Greater Antilles |
| Christmas Island | CX; CXR | One main island | Oceanic | Australia | 135 | 52 | 1,496 | 11.1 | 29 | Indian Ocean, Australasia |
| Cocos (Keeling) Islands | CC; CCK | Archipelago | Oceanic | Australia | 14 | 5.4 | 596 | 42.6 | 110 | Indian Ocean, Australasia |
| Curaçao | CW; CUW | One main island (central island of the ABC Islands) | Continental shelf | Netherlands | 444 | 171 | 145,834 | 328 | 850 | Caribbean Sea, Lesser Antilles |
| Easter Island | CL; CHL | One main island | Oceanic | Chile | 163.6 | 63.2 | 6,148 | 37.5 | 97 | Pacific Ocean, Polynesia |
| Falkland Islands | FK; FLK | Archipelago with two main islands | Continental shelf | United Kingdom (Note: The Falkland Islands and South Georgia and the South Sandwich Islands are also claimed by Argentina.) | 12,173 | 4,700 | 3,140 | 0.26 | 0.67 | Atlantic Ocean, South America |
| Faroe Islands | FO; FRO | Archipelago | Continental shelf | Denmark | 1,393 | 538 | 49,483 | 35.5 | 92 | Atlantic Ocean |
| French Polynesia | PF; PYF | Five archipelagos: The Society Islands; The Tuamotu Archipelago; The Gambier Islands; The Marquesas Islands; The Austral Islands | Oceanic | France | 3,827 | 1,478 | 274,512 | 71.7 | 186 | Pacific Ocean, Polynesia |
| French Southern and Antarctic Lands | TF; ATF | Several scattered archipelagos — Crozet Islands, Kerguelen Islands, Saint Paul and Amsterdam Islands and the Scattered Islands in the Indian Ocean — plus Adélie Land (432,000 km^{2} claim to uninhabited territory in Antarctica) | Oceanic | France | 7,747 | 2,991 | 150 | 49.4 | 128 | Indian Ocean, Southern Ocean |
| Galápagos Islands | EC; ECU | Archipelago | Oceanic | Ecuador | 8,010 | 3,090 | 33,042 | 4.1 | 11 | Pacific Ocean |
| Greenland | GL; GRL | One main island with several archipelagos | Continental shelf | Denmark | 2,166,086 | 836,330 | 57,695 | 0.03 | 0.078 | North America |
| Guadeloupe | GP; GLP | Archipelago | Oceanic | France | 1,628 | 629 | 405,500 | 250 | 650 | Caribbean Sea, Lesser Antilles |
| Guam | GU; GUM | One main island | Oceanic | United States | 544 | 210 | 159,914 | 293 | 760 | Pacific Ocean, Micronesia |
| Guernsey (Note: The Bailiwicks of Guernsey and Jersey and the Isle of Man are peculiars of the British Crown and not part of the United Kingdom; foreign relations and defence are provided by the UK.) | GG; GGY | Three main islands: Guernsey; Alderney; Sark | Continental shelf | United Kingdom | 78 | 30 | 65,849 | 844 | 2,190 | English Channel, Channel Islands |
| Heard and McDonald Islands | HM; HMD | Two main islands (Heard Island and McDonald Island) | Oceanic | Australia | 412 | 159 | No permanent resident | 0 | 0 | Southern Ocean |
| Isle of Man | IM; IMN | One main island and a minor island (the Calf of Man) | Continental shelf | United Kingdom | 572 | 221 | 85,421 | 149 | 390 | Irish Sea, British Isles |
| Jan Mayen | SJ; SJM | One mid-Atlantic ridge volcanic seamount | Continental shelf | Norway | 377 | 146 | No permanent resident | 0 | 0 | Arctic Ocean |
| Jersey | JE; JEY | One main island | Continental shelf | United Kingdom | 116 | 45 | 94,949 | 819 | 2,120 | English Channel, Channel Islands |
| Juan Fernández Islands | CL; CHL | Three main islands: Robinson Crusoe; Alejandro Selkirk; Santa Clara | Oceanic | Chile | 100 | 39 | 926 | 9.2 | 24 | Pacific Ocean |
| Lakshadweep | IN; IND | Archipelago | Oceanic | India | 32.62 | 12.59 | 64,473 | 2,000 | 5,200 | Indian Ocean |
| Martinique | MQ; MTQ | One main island | Oceanic | France | 1,128 | 436 | 403,795 | 360 | 930 | Caribbean Sea, Lesser Antilles |
| Mayotte | YT; MYT | One main island | Oceanic | France | 374 | 144 | 194,000 | 498.5 | 1,291 | Indian Ocean, Africa, Comoros Islands |
| Montserrat | MS; MST | One main island | Oceanic | United Kingdom | 102 | 39 | 5,164 | 50.6 | 131 | Caribbean Sea, Lesser Antilles |
| New Caledonia | NC; NCL | Archipelago around one main island | Continental shelf | France | 18,275 | 7,056 | 260,166 | 14.2 | 37 | Pacific Ocean, Melanesia |
| Norfolk Island | NF; NFK | One main island | Continental shelf | Australia | 36 | 14 | 2,182 | 60.6 | 157 | Pacific Ocean, Melanesia |
| Northern Mariana Islands | MP; MNP | Archipelago | Oceanic | United States | 464 | 179 | 51,395 | 111 | 290 | Pacific Ocean, Micronesia |
| Pitcairn, Henderson, Ducie, and Oeno Islands | PN; PCN | Archipelago | Oceanic | United Kingdom | 47 | 18 | 48 | 1.0 | 2.6 | Pacific Ocean, Polynesia |
| Puerto Rico | PR; PRI | Archipelago around one main island | Various | United States | 8,868 | 3,424 | 3,203,295 | 361 | 930 | Caribbean Sea, Greater Antilles |
| Réunion | RE; REU | One main island | Oceanic | France | 2,512 | 970 | 893,500 | 330 | 850 | Indian Ocean, Africa, Mascarene Islands |
| San Andrés and Providencia | CO; COL | Two archipelagos around two main islands of San Andrés and Providencia | Oceanic | Colombia | 525 | 203 | 61,280 | 1,200 | 3,100 | Caribbean Sea |
| Saint Barthélemy | BL; BLM | Archipelago around one main island | Oceanic | France | 21 | 8.1 | 7,332 | 349 | 900 | Caribbean Sea, Lesser Antilles |
| Saint Helena, Ascension, and Tristan da Cunha | SH; SHN | Three main islands distant from each other of: Saint Helena; Ascension; Tristan da Cunha | Oceanic | United Kingdom | 308 | 119 | 7,728 | 25.1 | 65 | Atlantic Ocean |
| Saint Martin | MF; MAF | Part of a larger island (Saint Martin) | Oceanic | France | 54.4 | 21.0 | 30,959 | 569 | 1,470 | Caribbean Sea, Lesser Antilles |
| Saint Pierre and Miquelon | PM; SPM | Two main islands | Continental shelf | France | 242 | 93 | 5,831 | 24.1 | 62 | North America |
| Sint Maarten | SX; SXM | Part of a larger island (Saint Martin) | Oceanic | Netherlands | 34 | 13 | 39,088 | 1,150 | 3,000 | Caribbean Sea, Lesser Antilles |
| South Georgia and the South Sandwich Islands | GS; SGs | One main island and neighbouring archipelago | Continental shelf | United Kingdom | 3,903 | 1,507 | 30 | 30 | 78 | Atlantic Ocean |
| Sovereign Base Areas of Akrotiri and Dhekelia (SBA) | GB; GBR | Parts of a larger island (Cyprus) | Continental shelf | United Kingdom | 254 | 98 | 15,700 | 61.8 | 160 | Mediterranean Sea |
| Svalbard (Note: Administered by Norway under the Svalbard Treaty.) | SJ; SJM | Archipelago | Continental shelf | Norway | 62,045 | 23,956 | 2,763 | 0.044 | 0.11 | Arctic Ocean |
| Tokelau (Note: Tokelau is a dependent territory of New Zealand.) | TK; TKL | Archipelago | Oceanic | New Zealand | 12 | 4.6 | 1,368 | 114 | 300 | Pacific Ocean, Polynesia |
| Turks and Caicos Islands | TC; TCA | Archipelago of two island groups | Continental shelf | United Kingdom | 948 | 366 | 46,335 | 48.9 | 127 | Atlantic Ocean, Lucayan Archipelago |
| United States Minor Outlying Islands | UM; UMI | Loose scattered archipelago of eight Pacific insular areas with one Caribbean (Navassa Island) | Oceanic | United States | 41 | 16 | 300 | 7.3 | 19 | Pacific Ocean, Micronesia, Polynesia, and Caribbean Sea |
| U.S. Virgin Islands | VI; VIR | Archipelago | Oceanic | United States | 346 | 134 | 87,146 | 252 | 650 | Caribbean Sea, Lesser Antilles |
| Wallis and Futuna | WF; WLF | Three main islands of: Uvea (Wallis); Hoorn Islands of Futuna and Alofi Island | Oceanic | France | 264 | 102 | 15,289 | 57.9 | 150 | Pacific Ocean, Polynesia |

== Former sovereign island nations and primarily island-based countries ==
=== Africa ===
- State of Anjouan (1997–2008)
- Sultanate of Bambao (Ngazidja, 1886–1908)
- Merina Kingdom
- Mohéli (1997–1998)
- Mwali Sultanate
- Sultanate of Ndzuwani
- Sultanate of Zanzibar

=== Asia ===
- East Asia
  - Republic of Ezo
  - Republic of Formosa
  - Empire of Japan, (1868–1910) (Note: By 1910, the Empire of Japan was restricted to the entire Japanese archipelago, Southern Sakhalin, Kuril Islands and Taiwan, before its official annexation of Korea. The Japanese concessions in China including the Kwantung Leased Territory which acquired by Japan before 1905 were regarded as Chinese territories under foreign jurisdiction, they were not officially annexed by Japan and obliged to be returned under a fixed-term territorial lease by bilateral agreements.)
  - Ryūkyū Kingdom
  - Tamna
  - Kingdom of Tungning
  - Usan
  - Yamatai
- Southeast Asia
  - Aceh Sultanate
  - Aru Kingdom
  - Bali Kingdom
  - Sultanate of Banjar
  - Banten Sultanate
  - Blambangan Kingdom
  - Sultanate of Brunei
  - Buton Sultanate
  - Rajahnate of Butuan
  - Sultanate of Cirebon
  - Sultanate of Deli
  - Demak Sultanate
  - Galuh Kingdom
  - Sultanate of Gowa
  - Janggala
  - Kediri Kingdom
  - Lanfang Republic
  - Sultanate of Maguindanao
  - Ma-i
  - Majapahit
  - Mataram kingdom
  - Mataram Sultanate
  - Maynila
  - Melayu Kingdom
  - Pagaruyung Kingdom
  - First Philippine Republic
  - Pontianak Sultanate
  - Riau-Lingga Sultanate
  - Sultanate of Sambas
  - Raj of Sarawak
  - Sultanate of Siak
  - Kingdom of Singapura
  - Singhasari
  - Srivijaya
  - Sugbu
  - Sultanate of Sulu
  - Sunda Kingdom
  - Tarumanagara
  - Sultanate of Ternate
  - Sultanate of Tidore
- South Asia
  - Kingdom of Anuradhapura
  - Dominion of Ceylon
  - Kingdom of Dambadeniya
  - Kingdom of Gampola
  - Jaffna Kingdom
  - Kingdom of Kandy
  - Kingdom of Kotte
  - Kingdom of Polonnaruwa
  - Kingdom of Sitawaka
  - United Suvadive Republic
- Western Asia
  - Kingdom of Ormus

=== Europe ===
- Mediterranean Sea
  - Archaic Greek city-states
    - Andros
    - Delos
    - Khios
    - Lesbos
    - Milos
    - Minoans
    - Pholegandros
    - Rhodes
    - Samos
    - Syracuse, Sicily
    - Zakynthos
  - Lordship of Chios
  - Kingdom of Corsica (1736)
  - Corsican Republic
  - Anglo-Corsican Kingdom
  - Emirate of Crete
  - Cretan State
  - Kingdom of Cyprus
  - Duchy of the Archipelago
  - Principality of Elba
  - Gozo (independent state)
  - Hospitaller Malta
  - Hospitaller Rhodes
  - Kingdom of Majorca
  - Triarchy of Negroponte
  - Sardinian Judicati
    - Judicate of Arborea
    - Judicate of Cagliari
    - Judicate of Gallura
    - Judicate of Logudoro
  - Republic of Sassari
  - Emirate of Sicily
  - Kingdom of Sicily, (1282–1816) (Note: Before the outbreak of Sicilian Vespers in 1282, the Kingdom of Sicily encompassed both the island of Sicily and south Italy; the war resulted the division of the kingdom into two parts as "Kingdom of Trinacria" (island part), and Kingdom of Naples (mainland part) which still officially called itself "Kingdom of Sicily". The two Sicilian kingdoms had since remained separate until 1816, when they remerged to form the Kingdom of the Two Sicilies.)
- North Europe & West Europe
  - Dál Riata
  - Commonwealth of England / Commonwealth of England, Scotland and Ireland
  - Kingdom of England
  - Kingdom of Great Britain
  - Heptarchy (seven kingdoms before the unification of England)
  - Kingdom of Mann and the Isles
  - Commonwealth of Iceland
  - Kingdom of Iceland
  - Gaelic Ireland
  - Norman Ireland
  - Kingdom of Ireland
  - Irish Free State
  - Soviet Republic of Naissaar
  - Kingdom of Scotland (Kingdom of Alba before the First War of Scottish Independence)
  - Kingdom of Strathclyde
  - Principality of Wales
    - Brycheiniog
    - Kingdom of Deheubarth
    - Kingdom of Gwent
    - Kingdom of Gwynedd
    - Kingdom of Morgannwg
    - Kingdom of Powys

=== North America ===
- Republic of Anguilla
- First Republic of Cuba
- First Empire of Haiti
- Second Empire of Haiti
- Kingdom of Haiti
- Republic of Spanish Haiti
- Republic of the Floridas
- West Indies Federation, (1958–1962) (Note: Dissolved in 1962 and then divided into Anguilla, Antigua, Barbados, Barbuda, the Cayman Islands, Dominica, Grenada, Jamaica, Montserrat, Saint Kitts and Nevis, Saint Lucia, Saint Vincent and the Grenadines, Trinidad and Tobago, and the Turks and Caicos Islands.)

=== Oceania ===
- Kingdom of Bora Bora
- Franceville, New Hebrides
- Kingdom of Fiji
- Kingdom of Hawaii
- Republic of Hawaii
- Republic of the North Solomons
- Kingdom of Tahiti
- Tuʻi Tonga Empire
- Yapese Empire

== Former colonies, possessions, protectorates, and other territories ==
- Annobón (1474–1778), now part of Equatorial Guinea
- Bay Islands, now a department of Honduras
- Cape Breton Island, now part of Nova Scotia, Canada
- Danish West Indies, now the United States Virgin Islands
- Elobey, Annobón and Corisco (1843–1926) unified with the rest of Spanish Guinea
- Fernando Po (1778–1926)
- The Territory of Hawaii, now Hawaii, a state of the United States
- Heligoland (1807–1890)
- Hong Kong Island (1841–1860), now a part of Hong Kong, a special administrative region of China (Note: The Crown Colony of Hong Kong covered only Hong Kong Island from 1841 to 1860. Kowloon, south of Boundary Street on the continent, was added in 1860, and extended to include the New Territories in 1898.)
- United States of the Ionian Islands, protectorate of the United Kingdom.
- Septinsular Republic, protectorate in the Ionian Islands under nominal Russo-Ottoman joint sovereignty.
- Labuan, briefly part of British North Borneo, the Straits Settlements and Sabah, now a federal territory of Malaysia
- Mayotte, now an overseas department and region of France
- Minorca (1713–1802)
- Colony of Newfoundland (1583–1907) (Note: The colony covered the island of Newfoundland before 1809. In 1809, part of the Labrador Peninsula was transferred to Newfoundland from Lower Canada. In other words, before 1809, Newfoundland was an island colony. From 1809 onwards, the Colony of Newfoundland and, since 1907, the Dominion of Newfoundland had been an island plus Labrador (an area on the continent of North America).)
- New Hebrides, now Vanuatu
- British North Borneo
- Padang
- Prince of Wales Island between 1786 and 1800, at that point joined by Province Wellesley (now Seberang Perai). Now as the state of Penang in the Malaysian federation.
- Prince Edward Island, now a province of Canada
- The Providence Island colony
- Queen Charlotte Islands
- Réunion, now an overseas department and region of France
- Saint Christopher-Nevis-Anguilla, former British overseas territory dissolved in 1983.
- Socotra Archipelago, now a governorate of Yemen
- Tasmania, now a state of Australia, shares a land boundary with Victoria on Boundary Islet
- Vancouver Island, now a part of British Columbia, Canada
- People's Republic of Zanzibar, now a member of the United Republic of Tanzania.

== Island countries with man-made fixed links to continents ==
- Bahrain to Saudi Arabia via the King Fahd Causeway
- Singapore to Malaysia via the Johor–Singapore Causeway since 1924, with the Tuas Second Link added in 1998
- United Kingdom to France via the Channel Tunnel

== See also ==
- Archipelagic state
- List of archipelagos
- List of Caribbean countries by population
- List of countries that border only one other country
- List of divided islands
- Lists of islands
- List of islands by area
- List of islands by population
- List of islands by population density
- List of Oceanian countries by population
- List of sovereign states and dependent territories in Oceania
- List of sovereign states and dependent territories in the Indian Ocean
- Small Island Developing States
- Thalassocracy
