= Dependent territory =

Territory that does not possess full political independence as a sovereign state

A dependent territory, dependent area, or dependency (sometimes referred as an external territory) is a territory that does not possess full political independence or sovereignty as a sovereign state but remains politically outside the controlling state's integral area.

A dependent territory is commonly distinguished from a country subdivision by being considered not to be a constituent part of a sovereign state. An administrative subdivision, instead, is understood to be a division of a state proper. A dependent territory, conversely, often maintains a great degree of autonomy from its controlling state. Historically, most colonies were considered to be dependent territories. Not all autonomous entities are considered to be dependent territories. Most inhabited, dependent territories have their own ISO 3166 country codes.

Some political entities inhabit a special position guaranteed by an international treaty or another agreement, thereby creating a certain level of autonomy (e.g. a difference in immigration rules). Those entities are sometimes considered to be, or are at least grouped with, dependent territories, but are officially considered by their governing states to be an integral part of those states.

== Summary ==
The lists below include the following:

=== Dependent territories ===
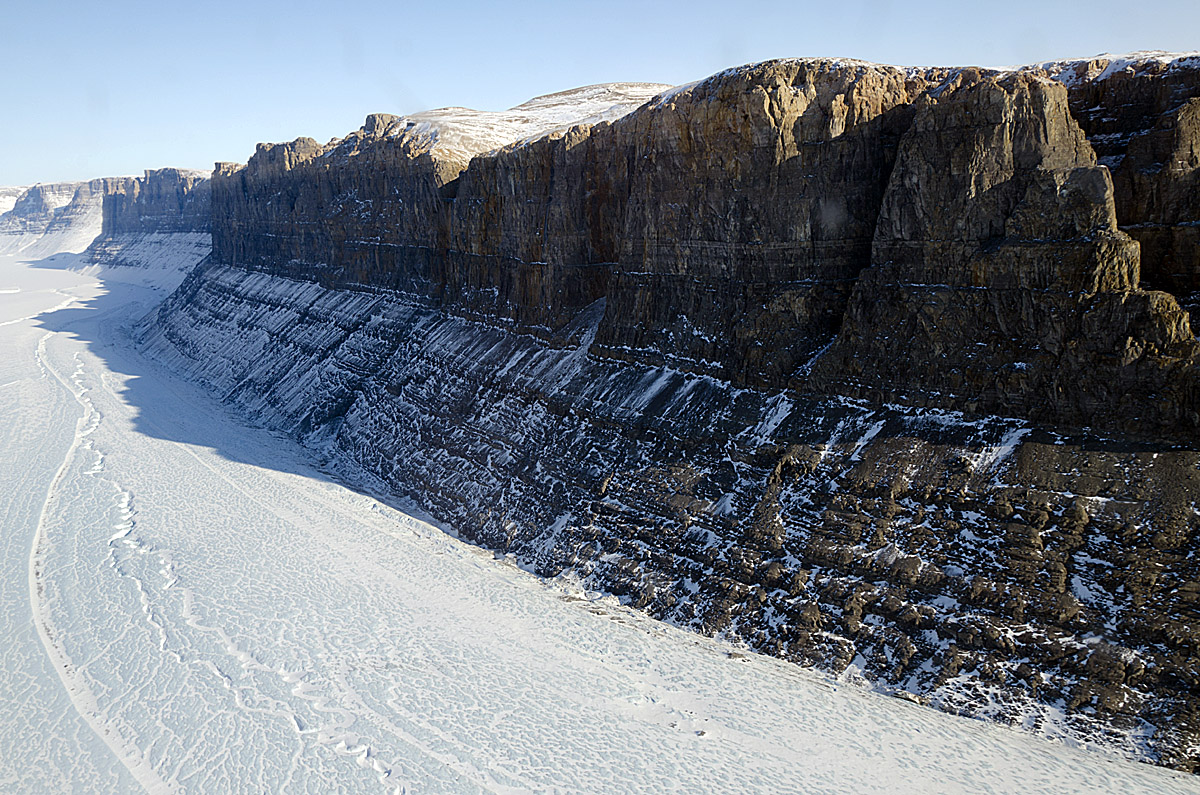
Greenland, an autonomous territory of Denmark in North America

- Two states in free association, one dependent territory, and one Antarctic claim in the listing for New Zealand
- One uninhabited territory and two Antarctic claims in the listing for Norway
- 13 overseas territories (ten autonomous, two used primarily as military bases, and one uninhabited), three Crown dependencies, and one Antarctic claim in the listing for the United Kingdom
- 13 unincorporated territories (five inhabited and eight uninhabited) and two claimed but uncontrolled territories in the listing for the United States

=== Similar entities ===
- Six external territories (three inhabited and three uninhabited) and one Antarctic claim in the listing for Australia
- Two special administrative regions in the listing for China
- Two self-governing territories with autonomy in internal affairs in the listing for Denmark
- One autonomous region governed according to an act and international treaties in the listing for Finland
- Five autonomous overseas collectivities, one sui generis collectivity, and two uninhabited overseas territories (one of which includes an Antarctic claim) in the listing for France
- Three constituent countries with autonomy in internal affairs in the listing for the Netherlands
- One internal territory with limited sovereignty in the listing for Norway

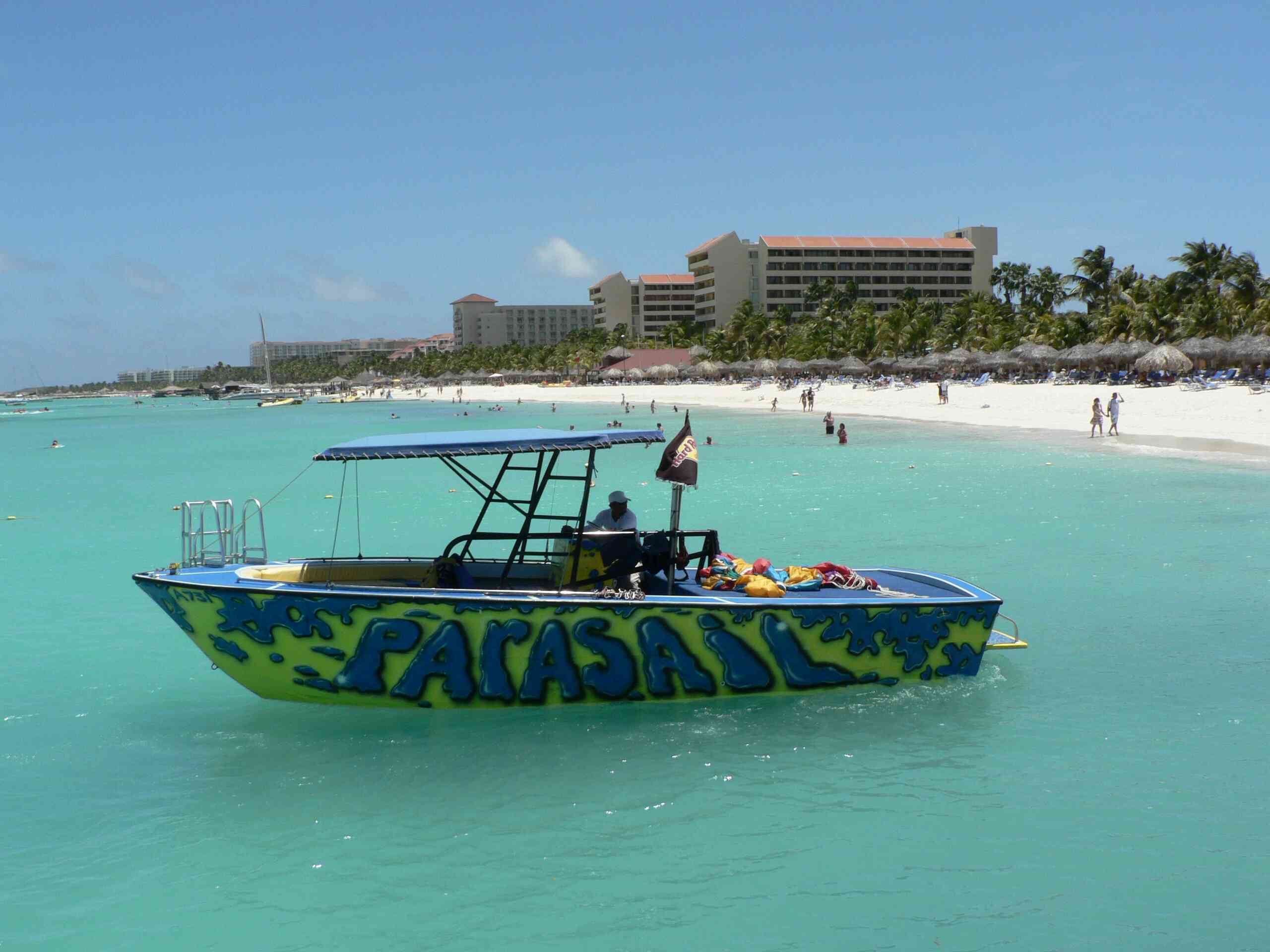
Aruba, a dependent territory of the Netherlands in the Caribbean

Dependent territories and their sovereign states. All territories are labeled according to ISO 3166-1 (Note: Each territory in the United States Minor Outlying Islands is labeled UM- followed by the first letter of its name and another unique letter if needed.) or with numbers. (Note: The following territories do not have ISO 3166-1 codes: 1: Akrotiri and Dhekelia 2: Ashmore and Cartier Islands 3: Coral Sea Islands) Coloured areas without labels are integral parts of their respective countries. Antarctica is shown as a condominium instead of individual claims.

== Lists of dependent territories ==
This list includes all territories that have not been legally incorporated into their governing state, including several territories that are not on the list of non-self-governing territories of the General Assembly of the United Nations. All claims in Antarctica are listed in italics.

=== New Zealand ===
New Zealand has two self-governing associated states, one dependent territory, and a territorial claim in Antarctica.

Associated state	Administration	ISO 3166 country code
Cook Islands	Self-governing state in free association with New Zealand since 1965. Cook Islands' status is considered to be equivalent to independence for international law purposes, and the country exercises full sovereignty over its internal and external affairs. Under the terms of the free association agreement, however, New Zealand retains some responsibility for the foreign relations and defence of the Cook Islands. These responsibilities confer no rights of control and are exercised only at the request of the Cook Islands Government. The government of New Zealand does not consider it appropriate for the Cook Islands to have a separate seat at the United Nations, due to its continued use of the right of Cook Islanders to have New Zealand citizenship.	CK
Niue	Self-governing state in free association with New Zealand since 1974. Niue's status is considered to be equivalent to independence for international law purposes, and the country exercises full sovereignty over its internal and external affairs. Under the terms of the free association agreement, however, New Zealand retains some responsibility for the foreign relations and defence of Niue. These responsibilities confer no rights of control and are exercised only at the request of the Government of Niue. The government of New Zealand does not consider it appropriate for Niue to have a separate seat at the United Nations, due to its continued use of the right of Niueans to have New Zealand citizenship.	NU
Dependent territory	Administration	ISO 3166 country code
Tokelau	Territory of New Zealand. A UN-sponsored referendum on self-governance in February 2006 did not produce the two-thirds supermajority necessary for changing the current political status. Another one was in October 2007, which failed to reach the two-thirds margin. Appears on the United Nations list of non-self-governing territories.	TK
Dependent territory (uninhabited, claimed)	Administration	ISO 3166 country code
Ross Dependency	This is New Zealand's Antarctic claim. Unlike Tokelau and the associated states (Cook Islands and Niue), the Ross Dependency is, according to the New Zealand government, constitutionally part of New Zealand.	No unique ISO 3166 country codes

=== Norway ===
Norway has one dependent territory and two Antarctic claims. Norway also possesses the inhabited islands of Svalbard where Norwegian sovereignty is limited (see below).

Dependent territory (uninhabited)	Administration	ISO 3166 country code
Bouvet Island	Dependency administered from Oslo by the Polar Affairs Department of the Ministry of Justice and the Police.	BV
Dependent territory (uninhabited, claimed)	Administration	ISO 3166 country code
Peter I Island	Dependencies (subject to the Antarctic Treaty System) administered from Oslo by the Polar Affairs Department of the Ministry of Justice and the Police.	No unique ISO 3166 country codes
Queen Maud Land	Dependencies (subject to the Antarctic Treaty System) administered from Oslo by the Polar Affairs Department of the Ministry of Justice and the Police.	No unique ISO 3166 country codes

=== United Kingdom ===
The United Kingdom has three "Crown Dependencies", thirteen "Overseas Territories" (ten autonomous, two used primarily as military bases, and one uninhabited), and one Antarctic claim.

Crown Dependency	Administration	ISO 3166 country code
Guernsey	Responsibility for defence, international representation, and good government rests with the United Kingdom.	GG
Isle of Man	Responsibility for defence, international representation, and good government rests with the United Kingdom.	IM
Jersey	Responsibility for defence, international representation, and good government rests with the United Kingdom.	JE
Overseas Territory	Administration	ISO 3166 country code
Anguilla	House of Assembly of Anguilla handles domestic affairs. Appears on the United Nations list of non-self-governing territories.	AI
Bermuda	Parliament of Bermuda handles domestic affairs and the territory is defined by the U.K. as self-governing. Appears on the United Nations list of non-self-governing territories.	BM
British Virgin Islands	House of Assembly of the British Virgin Islands handles domestic affairs. Appears on the United Nations list of non-self-governing territories	VG
Cayman Islands	Parliament of the Cayman Islands handles domestic affairs. Almost complete internal self-government. Appears on the United Nations list of non-self-governing territories.	KY
Falkland Islands	Legislative Assembly of the Falkland Islands handles domestic affairs. Appears on the United Nations list of non-self-governing territories.	FK
Gibraltar	Gibraltar Parliament handles domestic affairs. Almost complete internal self-government. Appears on the United Nations list of non-self-governing territories.	GI
Montserrat	Legislative Council of Montserrat handles domestic affairs. Appears on the United Nations list of non-self-governing territories.	MS
Pitcairn Islands	Island Council of the Pitcairn Islands handles some domestic affairs, however decisions are subject to approval by the Governor of the Pitcairn Islands, reporting to the Foreign and Commonwealth Office. Appears on the United Nations list of non-self-governing territories.	PN
Saint Helena, Ascension and Tristan da Cunha	Legislative Council of Saint Helena, Ascension Island Council and Tristan da Cunha Island Council handle domestic affairs. Appears on the United Nations list of non-self-governing territories.	SH
Turks and Caicos Islands	House of Assembly of the Turks and Caicos Islands handles some domestic affairs. Appears on the United Nations list of non-self-governing territories.	TC
Overseas Territory (Sovereign Base Areas)	Administration	ISO 3166 country code
Akrotiri and Dhekelia	Two sovereign base areas administered as a single British overseas territory by the Commander of British Forces Cyprus, reporting to the Ministry of Defence. Permanent Cypriot population, as well as British military personnel and their families.	No unique ISO 3166 country codes
Overseas Territory (uninhabited)	Administration	ISO 3166 country code
British Indian Ocean Territory	Administered by the Commissioner for the British Indian Ocean Territory, reporting to the Foreign, Commonwealth and Development Office. The Indigenous Chagossian population was removed between 1967 and 1973. Presently the territory is restricted to military personnel, principally at the joint U.K.-U.S. naval base on the atoll of Diego Garcia. Per a 2025 agreement, the territory is set to be ceded to Mauritius in the near future.	IO
South Georgia and the South Sandwich Islands	Administered by the Commissioner for South Georgia and the South Sandwich Islands (who is also the Governor of the Falkland Islands), reporting to the Foreign, Commonwealth and Development Office.	GS
Overseas Territory (uninhabited, claimed)	Administration	ISO 3166 country code
British Antarctic Territory	Administered by the Commissioner for the British Antarctic Territory, reporting to the Foreign, Commonwealth and Development Office. The UK's Antarctic claim.	No unique ISO 3166 country codes

=== United States ===
The United States has 13 "unincorporated" dependent territories under its administration and two claimed territories outside its control. The uninhabited Palmyra Atoll is administered similarly to some of these territories, and is usually included on lists of U.S. overseas territories, but it is excluded from this list because it is classified in U.S. law as an incorporated territory. The U.S. Constitution does not apply in full to the insular areas.

Unincorporated organized territory	Administration	ISO 3166 country code
Guam	Unincorporated organized territory of the U.S.; policy relations conducted through the Office of Insular Affairs of the Department of the Interior. Appears on the United Nations list of non-self-governing territories	GU or US-GU
Northern Mariana Islands	Unincorporated organized territory of the U.S. with Commonwealth status; federal funding administered by the Office of Insular Affairs of the Department of the Interior	MP or US-MP
Puerto Rico	Unincorporated organized territory of the U.S. with Commonwealth status; local government and residents are under the plenary authority of the U.S. Congress	PR or US-PR
U.S. Virgin Islands	Unincorporated organized territory of the U.S. Policy relations conducted by the Office of Insular Affairs of the Department of the Interior. Appears on the Department of the Interior	VI or US-VI
Unincorporated unorganized territory	Administration	ISO 3166 country code
American Samoa	Unincorporated unorganized territory administered by the Office of Insular Affairs of the Department of the Interior. Appears on the United Nations list of non-self-governing territories	AS or US-AS
Unincorporated unorganized territory (uninhabited) (Note: Midway Atoll and Wake Island have a few people, but these territories are not permanently inhabited.)	Administration	ISO 3166 country code
Baker Island	Unincorporated unorganized territories of the U.S. administered by the Fish and Wildlife Service of the Department of the Interior	UM-81
Howland Island	Unincorporated unorganized territories of the U.S. administered by the Fish and Wildlife Service of the Department of the Interior	UM-84
Jarvis Island	Unincorporated unorganized territories of the U.S. administered by the Fish and Wildlife Service of the Department of the Interior	UM-86
Johnston Atoll	Unincorporated unorganized territories of the U.S. administered by the Fish and Wildlife Service of the Department of the Interior	UM-67
Kingman Reef	Unincorporated unorganized territories of the U.S. administered by the Fish and Wildlife Service of the Department of the Interior	UM-89
Midway Atoll	Unincorporated unorganized territories of the U.S. administered by the Fish and Wildlife Service of the Department of the Interior	UM-71
Navassa Island	Unincorporated unorganized territory of the U.S. administered by the Fish and Wildlife Service of the Department of the Interior from the Cabo Rojo National Wildlife Refuge in Cabo Rojo, Puerto Rico	UM-76
Wake Island	Unincorporated unorganized territory of the U.S. administered by the U.S. Air Force under an agreement with the Department of the Interior	UM-79
Unincorporated unorganized territory (uninhabited, claimed)	Administration	ISO 3166 country code
Bajo Nuevo Bank	Administered by Colombia. Claimed by the United States (under the Guano Islands Act) and Jamaica. A claim by Nicaragua was resolved in 2012 in favor of Colombia by the International Court of Justice, although the U.S. was not a party to that case and does not recognize the court's compulsory jurisdiction.	
Serranilla Bank	Administered by Colombia; site of a naval garrison. Claimed by the United States (since 1879 under the Guano Islands Act) and Jamaica. A claim by Nicaragua was resolved in 2012 in favor of Colombia by the International Court of Justice, although the United States was not a party to that case and does not recognize the court's compulsory jurisdiction. A claim by Honduras was settled in a 1986 treaty over maritime boundaries with Colombia.	

== Lists of similar entities ==
The following entities are, according to the law of their state, integral parts of the state but exhibit many characteristics of dependent territories. This list is generally limited to entities that are either subject to an international treaty on their status, uninhabited, or have a unique level of autonomy and are largely self-governing in matters other than international affairs. It generally does not include entities with no unique autonomy, such as the five overseas departments and regions (French Guiana, Guadeloupe, Martinique, Mayotte, and Réunion) of France; the BES islands (Bonaire, Sint Eustatius, and Saba) of the Netherlands; Jan Mayen of Norway; and Palmyra Atoll of the United States.

Entities with only limited unique autonomy—such as Barbuda of Antigua and Barbuda; Sabah and Sarawak of Malaysia; the two autonomous regions (the Azores and Madeira) of Portugal; Nevis of Saint Kitts and Nevis; the Canary Islands and the two autonomous cities (Ceuta and Melilla) of Spain; Northern Ireland of the United Kingdom; and entities with non-recognized unique autonomy—such as Wa of Myanmar; Gaza of Palestine; Puntland of Somalia; Zapatista of Mexico; and The autonomous administration north and east Syria of Syria; Kurdistan Region of Iraq; Zanzibar of Tanzania—are also not included. All claims in Antarctica are listed in italics.

=== Australia ===
Australia has six external territories in its administration and one Antarctic claim.

Debate remains as to whether the external territories are integral parts of Australia, due to their not being part of Australia in 1901, when its constituent states federated (with the exception of the Coral Sea Islands, which was a part of Queensland). Norfolk Island was self-governing from 1979 to 2016. The external territories are often grouped separately from Australia proper for statistical purposes.

External territory	Administration	ISO 3166 country code
Christmas Island	Administered from Canberra by the Department of Infrastructure, Transport, Regional Development, Communications and the Arts	CX
Cocos (Keeling) Islands	Administered from Canberra by the Department of Infrastructure, Transport, Regional Development, Communications and the Arts	CC
Norfolk Island	Administered from Canberra by the Department of Infrastructure, Transport, Regional Development, Communications and the Arts	NF
External territory (uninhabited)	Administration	ISO 3166 country code
Ashmore and Cartier Islands	Administered from Canberra by the Department of Infrastructure, Transport, Regional Development, Communications and the Arts	No unique ISO 3166 country codes
Coral Sea Islands (Note: Willis Island is permanently staffed and occupied by a small team of meteorologists.)	Administered from Canberra by the Department of Infrastructure, Transport, Regional Development, Communications and the Arts	No unique ISO 3166 country codes
Heard Island and McDonald Islands	Administered from Canberra by the Department of Agriculture, Water and the Environment	HM
External territory (uninhabited, claimed)	Administration	ISO 3166 country code
Australian Antarctic Territory	Administered from Canberra by the Department of Agriculture, Water and the Environment	No unique ISO 3166 country codes

=== China ===
The People's Republic of China (PRC) has two special administrative regions (SARs) that are governed according to the constitution and respective basic laws. The SARs greatly differ from Mainland China in administrative, economic, legislative, and judicial terms including by currency, left-hand versus right-hand traffic, official languages, and immigration control. Although the PRC does claim sovereignty over Taiwan (governed by the Republic of China), it is not listed here as the PRC government does not have de facto control of the territory.

Special administrative region	Administration	ISO 3166 country code
Hong Kong	Former British colony. Special Administrative Region of the People's Republic of China since 1997 according to the Sino-British Joint Declaration, an international treaty registered with the United Nations. The Hong Kong Basic Law purports to provide for the territory to enjoy a "high degree" of autonomy per the "one country, two systems" model under the central government of China. Although the territory is not part of mainland China, it is officially considered an integral part of the People's Republic of China.	HK or CN-HK
Macau	Former Portuguese colony. Special Administrative Region of the People's Republic of China since 1999 according to the Sino-Portuguese Joint Declaration, an international treaty registered with the United Nations. The Macao Basic Law provides for the territory to enjoy a high degree of autonomy per the "one country, two systems" model under the central government of China. Although the territory is not part of mainland China, it is officially considered an integral part of the People's Republic of China.	MO or CN-MO

=== Denmark ===
The Kingdom of Denmark contains two autonomous territories with their own governments and legislatures, and input into foreign affairs.

Autonomous territory	Administration	ISO 3166 country code
Faroe Islands	Autonomous since 1948. A constituent part of the Kingdom of Denmark, but not of the European Union. Although it is not part of metropolitan Denmark, it is officially considered an integral part of the Kingdom of Denmark.	FO
Greenland	Autonomous since 1979. A constituent part of the Kingdom of Denmark, but withdrew from the European Economic Community in 1985. Although it is not part of metropolitan Denmark, it is officially considered an integral part of the Kingdom of Denmark.	GL

=== Finland ===
Finland has one autonomous region that is also subject to international treaties.

Autonomous region	Administration	ISO 3166 country code
Åland	Åland is governed according to the Act on the Autonomy of Åland and international treaties. These laws guarantee the islands' autonomy in Finland, which has ultimate sovereignty over them, as well as a demilitarised status.	AX or FI-01

=== France ===
France has overseas six autonomous collectivities and two uninhabited territories (one of which includes an Antarctic claim). This does not include its "standard" overseas regions (which are also overseas departments) of French Guiana, Guadeloupe, Martinique, Mayotte, and Réunion. Although also located overseas, they have the same status as the regions of metropolitan France. Nonetheless, all of France's overseas territory is considered an integral part of the French Republic.

Overseas collectivity	Administration	ISO 3166 country code
French Polynesia	Overseas collectivity since 2003; overseas country since 2004. Appears on the United Nations list of non-self-governing territories	PF or FR-PF
Saint Barthélemy	Seceded from Guadeloupe to become an overseas collectivity in 2007	BL or FR-BL
Saint Martin	Seceded from Guadeloupe to become an overseas collectivity in 2007. It is the only overseas collectivity that is fully part of the European Union.	MF or FR-MF
Saint Pierre and Miquelon	Territorial collectivity since 1985. Overseas collectivity since 2003	PM or FR-PM
Wallis and Futuna	Overseas territory since 1961. Overseas collectivity since 2003	WF or FR-WF
Sui generis collectivity	Administration	ISO 3166 country code
New Caledonia	"Sui generis" collectivity since 1998. Appears on the United Nations list of non-self-governing territories	NC or FR-NC
Overseas state private property (uninhabited)	Administration	ISO 3166 country code
Clipperton Island	The island is administered under the direct authority of the French government by the French Minister of the Overseas.	FR-CP
Overseas territory (uninhabited)	Administration	ISO 3166 country code
French Southern and Antarctic Lands	TAAF (Terres australes et antartiques françaises) is an overseas territory since 1955, administered from Paris by an Administrateur Supérieur. The territory includes the Antarctic claim of Adélie Land and several islands in the Indian Ocean, including Crozet Islands, Kerguelen Islands, Saint Paul and Amsterdam Islands and Scattered Islands	TF or FR-TF (Note: The Antarctic claim of Adélie Land (a district of the TAAF) is not included within the ISO 3166 designation. The ISO designates the remainder of the TAAF the "French Southern Territories".)

=== Netherlands ===
The Kingdom of the Netherlands comprises three autonomous "constituent countries" in the Caribbean (listed below) and one constituent country, the Netherlands, with most of its area in Europe but also encompassing three overseas Caribbean municipalities—Bonaire, Sint Eustatius, and Saba (these three Caribbean municipalities are excluded here because they are directly administered by the Government of the Netherlands). All citizens of the Dutch Kingdom share the same nationality and are thus citizens of the European Union, but only the European portion of the Kingdom is a part of the territory of the Union, the Customs Union, and the Eurozone while other areas have overseas countries and territory status.

Constituent country	Administration	ISO 3166 country code
Aruba	Defined as a "country" ("land") within the Kingdom by the Statute of the Kingdom of the Netherlands, Aruba obtained full autonomy in internal affairs upon separation from the Netherlands Antilles in 1986. Part of the Kingdom but not in Europe, its citizenship nonetheless includes status as citizens of the European Union (the Kingdom government coincides almost exactly with the Government of the Netherlands, and is responsible for defence, foreign affairs, and nationality law).	AW or NL-AW
Curaçao	Defined as a "country" ("land") within the Kingdom by the Statute of the Kingdom of the Netherlands, Curaçao and Sint Maarten were part of the Netherlands Antilles until it was dissolved in October 2010. Part of the Kingdom but not in Europe, their citizenship nonetheless includes status as citizens of the European Union (the Kingdom government coincides almost exactly with the Government of the Netherlands, and is responsible for defence, foreign affairs, and nationality law).	CW or NL-CW
Sint Maarten	Defined as a "country" ("land") within the Kingdom by the Statute of the Kingdom of the Netherlands, Curaçao and Sint Maarten were part of the Netherlands Antilles until it was dissolved in October 2010. Part of the Kingdom but not in Europe, their citizenship nonetheless includes status as citizens of the European Union (the Kingdom government coincides almost exactly with the Government of the Netherlands, and is responsible for defence, foreign affairs, and nationality law).	SX or NL-SX

=== Norway ===
Norway has, in the Arctic, one inhabited archipelago with restrictions placed on Norwegian sovereignty—Svalbard. Unlike the country's dependent territory (Bouvet Island) and Antarctic claims (see above), Svalbard is a part of the Kingdom of Norway. Norway also has one uninhabited remote archipelago located in the Arctic, Jan Mayen, but it is excluded in this list as the island is directly administered by the Nordland County Municipality and none of the considerations established for Svalbard Treaty are attributed to it.

Territory	Administration	ISO 3166 country code
Svalbard	This Arctic archipelago is the northernmost permanent civilian settlement in the world. Not incorporated into any county, it is administered by a governor appointed by the Norwegian government. Since 2002, its main settlement of Longyearbyen has elected a local government. Other settlements include the Russian mining community of Barentsburg, the research station of Ny-Ålesund, and the mining outpost of Sveagruva. The Svalbard Treaty of 1920 recognises Norwegian sovereignty (administered since 1925 as a sovereign part of the Kingdom of Norway) but established Svalbard as a free economic zone and a demilitarised zone.	SJ or NO-21

== Description ==
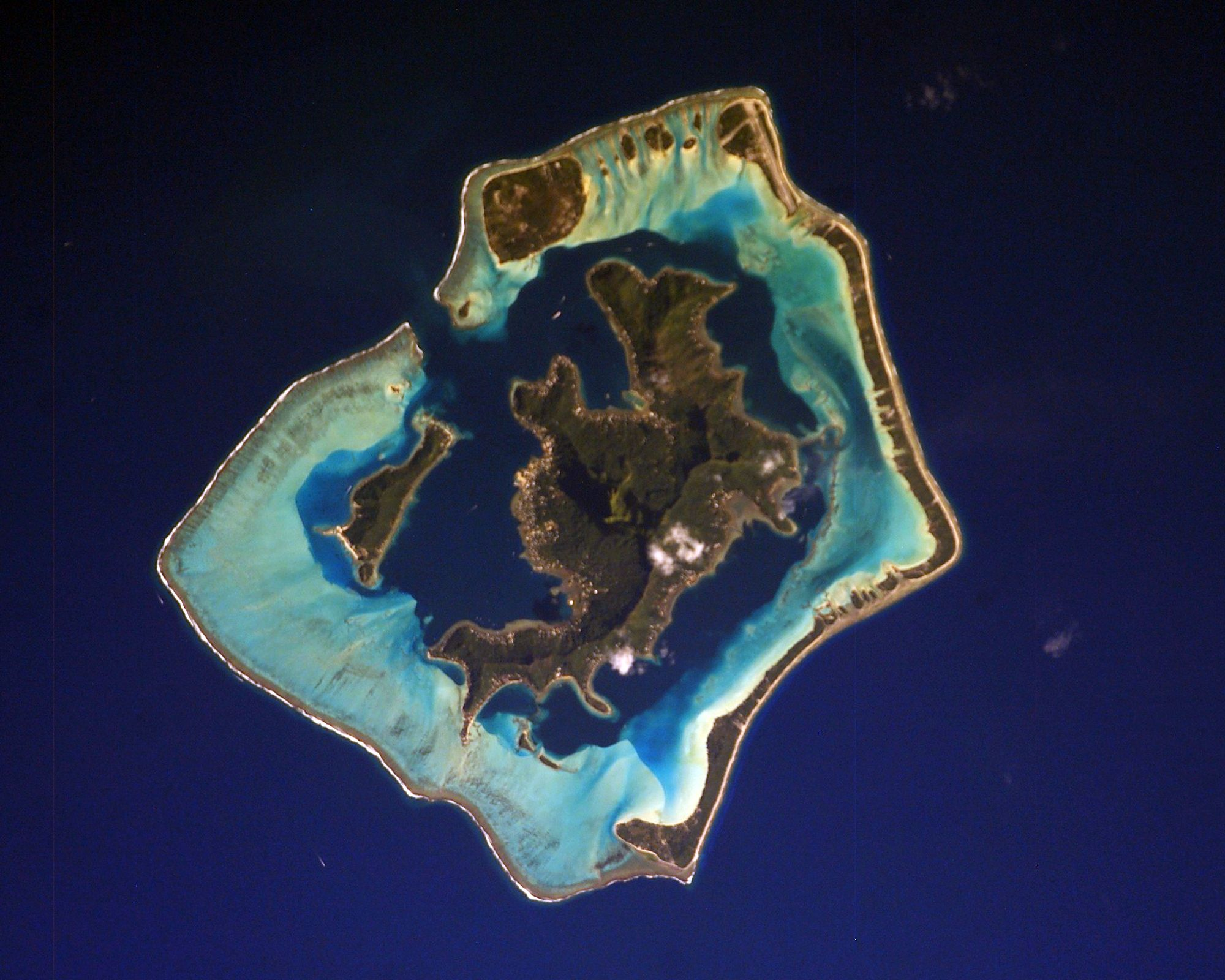
Bora Bora Island, French Polynesia

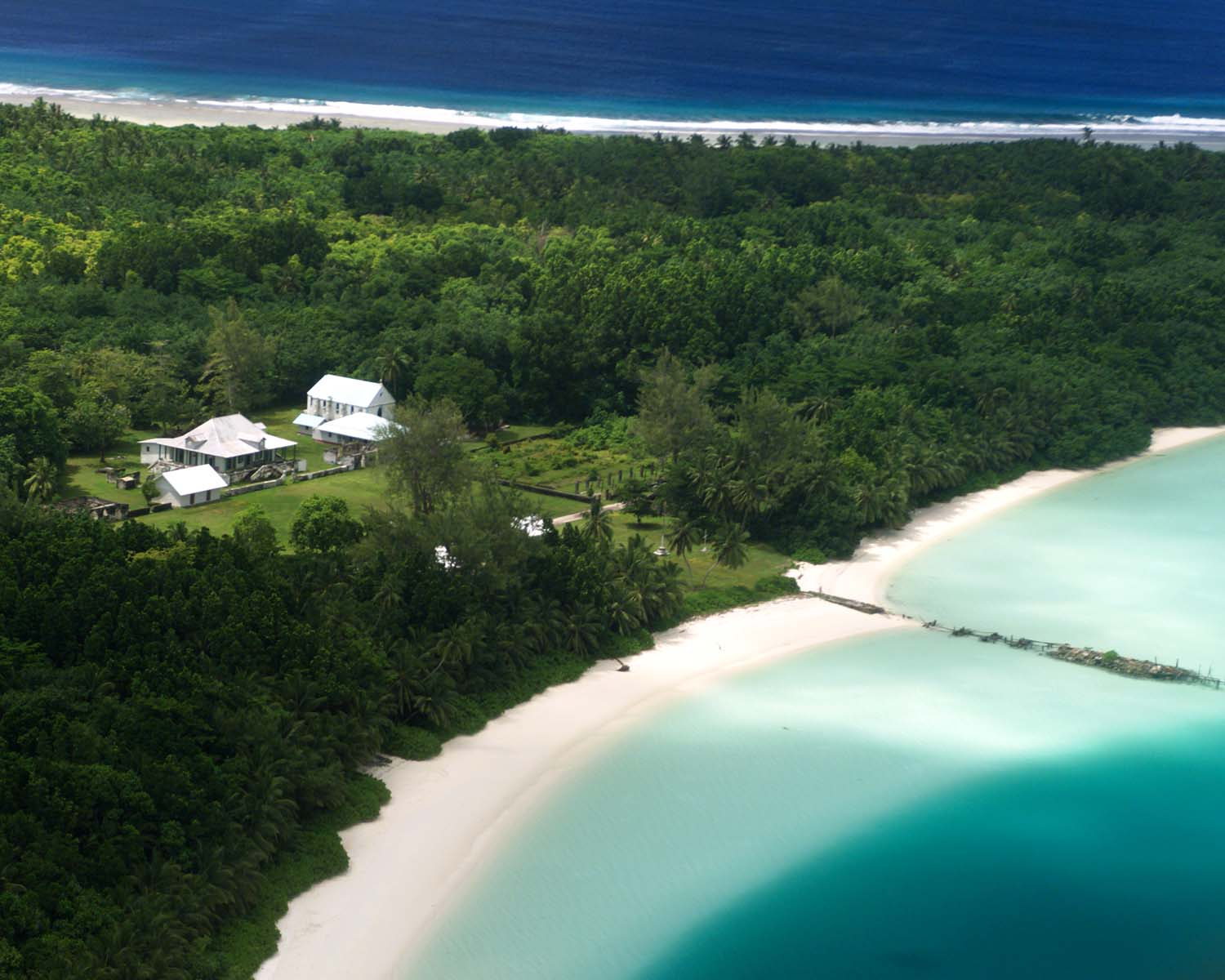
Diego Garcia Island, British Indian Ocean Territory

Three Crown Dependencies are in a form of association with the United Kingdom. They are independently administrated jurisdictions, although the British Government is solely responsible for defence and international representation and has ultimate responsibility for ensuring good government. They do not have diplomatic recognition as independent states, but neither are they integrated into the UK. The UK Parliament retains the ability to legislate for the crown dependencies even without the agreement of their legislatures. No crown dependency has representation in the UK Parliament.

Although they are British Overseas Territories, Bermuda and Gibraltar have similar relationships to the UK as do the Crown Dependencies. While the United Kingdom is officially responsible for their defence and international representation, these jurisdictions maintain their own militaries and have been granted limited diplomatic powers, in addition to having internal self-government.

New Zealand and its dependencies share the same governor-general and constitute one monarchic realm. The Cook Islands and Niue are officially termed associated states.

Puerto Rico (since 1952) and the Northern Mariana Islands (since 1986) are non-independent states freely associated with the United States. The mutually negotiated Covenant to Establish a Commonwealth of the Northern Mariana Islands (CNMI) in Political Union with the United States was approved in 1976. The covenant was fully implemented on November 3, 1986, under Presidential Proclamation no. 5564, which conferred U.S. citizenship on legally qualified CNMI residents. Under the Constitution of Puerto Rico, Puerto Rico is described as a Commonwealth and Puerto Ricans have a degree of administrative autonomy similar to that of a citizen of a U.S. state. Puerto Ricans "were collectively made U.S. citizens" in 1917, as a result of the Jones–Shafroth Act. The commonly used name in Spanish of the Commonwealth of Puerto Rico, Estado Libre Asociado de Puerto Rico, literally "Associated Free State of Puerto Rico", which sounds similar to "free association" particularly when loosely used in Spanish, is sometimes erroneously interpreted to mean that Puerto Rico's relationship with the United States is based on a Compact of Free Association and at other times is erroneously held to mean that Puerto Rico's relationship with the U.S. is based on an Interstate compact. This is a constant source of ambiguity and confusion when trying to define, understand, and explain Puerto Rico's political relationship with the United States. For various reasons Puerto Rico's political status differs from that of the Pacific Islands that entered into Compacts of Free Association with the United States. As sovereign states, these islands have the full right to conduct their foreign relations, while the Commonwealth of Puerto Rico has territorial status subject to U.S. congressional authority under the Constitution's Territory Clause, "to dispose of and make all needful Rules and Regulations respecting the Territory… belonging to the United States." Puerto Rico does not have the right to unilaterally declare independence, and at the last referendum (1998), the narrow majority voted for "none of the above", which was a formally undefined alternative used by commonwealth supporters to express their desire for an "enhanced commonwealth" option.

This kind of relationship can also be found in the Kingdom of the Netherlands, which is termed a federacy. The European continental part is organised like a unitary state. However, the status of its "constituent countries" in the Caribbean (Aruba, Curaçao, and Sint Maarten) can be considered akin to dependencies or "associated non-independent states."

The Kingdom of Denmark also operates similarly, akin to another federacy. The Faroe Islands and Greenland are two self-governing territories or regions within the Kingdom. The relationship between Denmark proper and these two territories is semi-officially termed the Rigsfællesskabet ("Unity of the Realm").

== Overview of inhabited dependent territories ==
Name	Population (2016)	Area (km^{2})	Area (mi^{2})	UN region	UN subregion	Sovereign state	Legal status
Akrotiri and Dhekelia	15,700	254	98	Asia	Western Asia	United Kingdom	Overseas territory (Sovereign Base Areas)
Åland	29,013	1,580	610	Europe	Northern Europe	Finland	Autonomous region
American Samoa	54,194	199	77	Oceania	Polynesia	United States	Unincorporated unorganized territory
Anguilla	15,100	91	35	Americas	Caribbean	United Kingdom	Overseas territory
Aruba	113,648	178.91	69.08	Americas	Caribbean	Netherlands	Constituent country
Bermuda	70,537	53.2	20.5	Americas	Northern America	United Kingdom	Overseas territory
British Virgin Islands	34,232	153	59	Americas	Caribbean	United Kingdom	Overseas territory
Cayman Islands	57,268	264	101.9	Americas	Caribbean	United Kingdom	Overseas territory
Christmas Island	2,205	135	52	Oceania	Australia and New Zealand	Australia	External territory
Cocos (Keeling) Islands	596	14	5.4	Oceania	Australia and New Zealand	Australia	External territory
Cook Islands	18,100	240	93	Oceania	Polynesia	New Zealand	Associated state
Curaçao	158,986	444	171	Americas	Caribbean	Netherlands	Constituent country
Falkland Islands	2,931	12,173	4,700	Americas	South America	United Kingdom	Overseas territory
Faroe Islands	49,188	4,167	540	Europe	Northern Europe	Denmark	Autonomous territory
French Polynesia	285,735	1,359	3,521	Oceania	Polynesia	France	Overseas collectivity (Overseas country)
Gibraltar	29,328	6.5	2.5	Europe	Southern Europe	United Kingdom	Overseas territory
Greenland	56,483	2,166,086	836,330	Americas	Northern America	Denmark	Autonomous territory
Guam	162,742	544	210	Oceania	Micronesia	United States	Unincorporated organized territory
Guernsey	63,026	65	25	Europe	Northern Europe	United Kingdom	Crown Dependency
Hong Kong	7,374,000	2,755	1,064	Asia	Eastern Asia	China	Special administrative region
Isle of Man	88,195	572	221	Europe	Northern Europe	United Kingdom	Crown Dependency
Jersey	98,069	118.2	45.6	Europe	Northern Europe	United Kingdom	Crown Dependency
Macau	650,900	115.3	44.5	Asia	Eastern Asia	China	Special administrative region
Montserrat	5,267	101	39	Americas	Caribbean	United Kingdom	Overseas territory
New Caledonia	275,355	18,576	7,172	Oceania	Melanesia	France	Sui generis collectivity
Niue	1,190	261.46	100.95	Oceania	Polynesia	New Zealand	Associated state
Norfolk Island	2,210	34.6	13.4	Oceania	Australia and New Zealand	Australia	External territory
Northern Mariana Islands	53,467	464	179	Oceania	Micronesia	United States	Unincorporated organized territory (Commonwealth)
Pitcairn Islands	57	43	17	Oceania	Polynesia	United Kingdom	Overseas territory
Puerto Rico	3,411,307	9,104	3,515	Americas	Caribbean	United States	Unincorporated organized territory (Commonwealth)
Saint Barthélemy	7,209	25	9.7	Americas	Caribbean	France	Overseas collectivity
Saint Helena, Ascension and Tristan da Cunha	5,633	394	152	Africa	Western Africa	United Kingdom	Overseas territory
Saint Martin	31,949	53.2	20.5	Americas	Caribbean	France	Overseas collectivity
Saint Pierre and Miquelon	5,595	242	93	Americas	Northern America	France	Overseas collectivity
Sint Maarten	41,486	37	14	Americas	Caribbean	Netherlands	Constituent country
Svalbard	2,667	61,022	23,561	Europe	Northern Europe	Norway	Unincorporated area
Tokelau	1,499	10	3.9	Oceania	Polynesia	New Zealand	Dependent territory
Turks and Caicos Islands	51,430	430	166	Americas	Caribbean	United Kingdom	Overseas territory
U.S. Virgin Islands	102,951	346.36	133.73	Americas	Caribbean	United States	Unincorporated organized territory
Wallis and Futuna	15,664	142	55	Oceania	Polynesia	France	Overseas collectivity

== See also ==
- Colonisation
- Colony
  - Self-governing colony
- Domestic dependent nations
- Gallery of flags of dependent territories
- Independence referendum
  - Past independence referendums
- List of administrative divisions by country
- List of autonomous areas by country
- List of countries by United Nations geoscheme
- Lists of former colonies, possessions, protectorates, and territories
  - Category:Former colonies
  - Protectorate
  - Timeline of national independence
- List of leaders of dependent territories
- List of sovereign states
- List of sovereign states and dependent territories by continent
- Suzerainty
- Vassal state

== Bibliography ==
- George Drower, Britain's Dependent Territories, Dartmouth, 1992
- George Drower, Overseas Territories Handbook, TSO, 1998
