= ISO 3166-1 =

ISO standard for country codes

ISO 3166-1 (Codes for the representation of names of countries and their subdivisions – Part 1: Country code) is a standard defining codes for the names of countries, dependent territories, and special areas of geographical interest. It is the first part of the ISO 3166 standard published by the International Organization for Standardization.

It defines three sets of country codes:

- ISO 3166-1 alpha-2 – two-letter country codes which are used most prominently for the Internet's country code top-level domains (with a few exceptions).
- ISO 3166-1 alpha-3 – three-letter country codes which allow a better visual association between the codes and the country names than the alpha-2 codes.
- ISO 3166-1 numeric – three-digit country codes which are identical to those developed and maintained by the United Nations Statistics Division, with the advantage of script (writing system) independence, and hence useful for people or systems using non-Latin scripts.

The alphabetic country codes were first included in ISO 3166 in 1974, and the numeric country codes were first included in 1981. The country codes have been published as ISO 3166-1 since 1997, when ISO 3166 was expanded into three parts, with ISO 3166-2 defining codes for subdivisions and ISO 3166-3 defining codes for former countries.

As a widely used international standard, ISO 3166-1 is implemented in other standards and used by international organizations to allow facilitation of the exchange of goods and information. However, it is not the only standard for country codes. Other country codes used by many international organizations are partly or totally incompatible with ISO 3166-1, although some of them closely correspond to ISO 3166-1 codes.

Find a country
Enter an ISO 3166-1 alpha-2 code to find the corresponding country article.

== Criteria for inclusion ==
Codes for 249 countries, territories, or areas of geographical interest are assigned in ISO 3166-1. According to the ISO 3166 Maintenance Agency (ISO 3166/MA), the only way to enter a new country name into ISO 3166-1 is to have it registered in one of the following two sources:

- United Nations Terminology Bulletin Country Names, or
- Country and Region Codes for Statistical Use of the United Nations Statistics Division.

To be listed in the bulletin Country Names, a country must be at least one of the following:

- A member state of the United Nations
- A member of one of its specialized agencies
- A party to the Statute of the International Court of Justice

The list of names in Country and Region Codes for Statistical Use of the UN Statistics Division is based on the bulletin Country Names and other UN sources.

Once a country name or territory name appears in either of these two sources, it will be added to ISO 3166-1 by default.

The ISO 3166/MA may reserve code elements for other entities that do not qualify for inclusion based on the above criteria. For example, because the European Union is not a country, it is not formally included in ISO 3166-1, but for practical reasons, the ISO 3166/MA has "reserved the two-letter combination EU for the purpose of identifying the European Union within the framework of ISO 3166-1".

== Information included ==
ISO 3166-1 is published officially in both English and French. Since the second edition of ISO 3166-1, the following columns are included for each entry:

1. Country Name – English (or French) short name (all upper-case)
2. English (or French) short name lower case (title case)
3. English (or French) full name
4. Alpha-2 code
5. Alpha-3 code
6. Numeric code
7. Remarks
8. Independent
9. Additional information: Administrative language(s) alpha-2 code element(s)
10. Additional information: Administrative language(s) alpha-3 code element(s)
11. Additional information: Local short name(s)

== Naming and code construction ==
The International Organization for Standardization uses the country names chosen by the United Nations, some of which are disputed.

=== Naming and disputes ===
The country names used in ISO 3166-1 are taken from the two UN sources. Some country names used by the UN, and accordingly by ISO, are disputed:

Short name upper case in ISO 3166	Short name lower case in ISO 3166 Full name	Listed as independent in ISO 3166	Local short name	Dispute	Link to ISO 3166-2
AFGHANISTAN	Afghanistan the Islamic Republic of Afghanistan	Yes	Afghānistān (ps); Afghānistān (fa)	Under the unrecognized government of the Islamic Emirate of Afghanistan	ISO 3166-2:AF
CHINA	China the People's Republic of China	Yes	Zhongguo (zh)	Disputed sovereignty with Taiwan	ISO 3166-2:CN
CYPRUS	Cyprus the Republic of Cyprus	Yes	Kýpros (el); Kıbrıs (tr)	Disputed sovereignty with Northern Cyprus	ISO 3166-2:CY
FALKLAND ISLANDS (MALVINAS)	Falkland Islands (the) [Malvinas] (Note: No full name in ISO 3166.)	No	Falkland Islands (the) [Malvinas] (en)	Disputed sovereignty and naming	ISO 3166-2:FK
PALESTINE, STATE OF	Palestine, State of the State of Palestine	No	Dawlat Filasţīn (ar)	Disputed sovereignty with Israel	ISO 3166-2:PS
TAIWAN, PROVINCE OF CHINA	Taiwan (Province of China)	No	Taiwan (zh)	Disputed sovereignty and naming	ISO 3166-2:TW
WESTERN SAHARA	Western Sahara	No	Aş Şaḩrā' al Gharbīyah (ar)	Disputed sovereignty with Morocco	ISO 3166-2:EH

=== Coding ===
The codes are chosen, according to the ISO 3166/MA, "to reflect the significant, unique component of the country name in order to allow a visual association between country name and country code". For this reason, common components of country names like "Republic", "Kingdom", "United", "Federal" or "Democratic" are normally not used for deriving the code elements. As a consequence, for example, the United Kingdom is officially assigned the alpha-2 code GB rather than UK, based on its official name "United Kingdom of Great Britain and Northern Ireland" (although UK is reserved on the request of the United Kingdom). The rule is not watertight: the United States of America is still assigned the US code for example. Some codes are chosen based on the native names of the countries. For example, Germany is assigned the alpha-2 code DE, based on its native name "Deutschland".

== Codes ==
The complete ISO 3166-1 list of countries and their assigned codes, listed in alphabetical order by the country's English short name used by the ISO 3166/MA:

Each country's alpha-2 code is linked to more information about the assignment of its code elements.

ISO 3166-1 table
English short name (using title case)	Alpha-2 code	Alpha-3 code	Numeric code	Link to ISO 3166-2	Independent (Note: See also the List of ISO 3166 country codes § Current ISO 3166 country codes regarding the sovereignty of the countries and areas.)
Afghanistan (Note: See also the table in § Naming and disputes above.)	AF	AFG	004	ISO 3166-2:AF	Yes
Åland Islands	AX	ALA	248	ISO 3166-2:AX	No
Albania	AL	ALB	008	ISO 3166-2:AL	Yes
Algeria	DZ	DZA	012	ISO 3166-2:DZ	Yes
American Samoa	AS	ASM	016	ISO 3166-2:AS	No
Andorra	AD	AND	020	ISO 3166-2:AD	Yes
Angola	AO	AGO	024	ISO 3166-2:AO	Yes
Anguilla	AI	AIA	660	ISO 3166-2:AI	No
Antarctica	AQ	ATA	010	ISO 3166-2:AQ	No
Antigua and Barbuda	AG	ATG	028	ISO 3166-2:AG	Yes
Argentina	AR	ARG	032	ISO 3166-2:AR	Yes
Armenia	AM	ARM	051	ISO 3166-2:AM	Yes
Aruba	AW	ABW	533	ISO 3166-2:AW	No
Australia	AU	AUS	036	ISO 3166-2:AU	Yes
Austria	AT	AUT	040	ISO 3166-2:AT	Yes
Azerbaijan	AZ	AZE	031	ISO 3166-2:AZ	Yes
Bahamas	BS	BHS	044	ISO 3166-2:BS	Yes
Bahrain	BH	BHR	048	ISO 3166-2:BH	Yes
Bangladesh	BD	BGD	050	ISO 3166-2:BD	Yes
Barbados	BB	BRB	052	ISO 3166-2:BB	Yes
Belarus	BY	BLR	112	ISO 3166-2:BY	Yes
Belgium	BE	BEL	056	ISO 3166-2:BE	Yes
Belize	BZ	BLZ	084	ISO 3166-2:BZ	Yes
Benin	BJ	BEN	204	ISO 3166-2:BJ	Yes
Bermuda	BM	BMU	060	ISO 3166-2:BM	No
Bhutan	BT	BTN	064	ISO 3166-2:BT	Yes
Bolivia, Plurinational State of	BO	BOL	068	ISO 3166-2:BO	Yes
Bonaire, Sint Eustatius and Saba (Note: Comprising Bonaire, Sint Eustatius, and Saba.)	BQ	BES	535	ISO 3166-2:BQ	No
Bosnia and Herzegovina	BA	BIH	070	ISO 3166-2:BA	Yes
Botswana	BW	BWA	072	ISO 3166-2:BW	Yes
Bouvet Island	BV	BVT	074	ISO 3166-2:BV	No
Brazil	BR	BRA	076	ISO 3166-2:BR	Yes
British Indian Ocean Territory	IO	IOT	086	ISO 3166-2:IO	No
Brunei Darussalam	BN	BRN	096	ISO 3166-2:BN	Yes
Bulgaria	BG	BGR	100	ISO 3166-2:BG	Yes
Burkina Faso	BF	BFA	854	ISO 3166-2:BF	Yes
Burundi	BI	BDI	108	ISO 3166-2:BI	Yes
Cabo Verde	CV	CPV	132	ISO 3166-2:CV	Yes
Cambodia	KH	KHM	116	ISO 3166-2:KH	Yes
Cameroon	CM	CMR	120	ISO 3166-2:CM	Yes
Canada	CA	CAN	124	ISO 3166-2:CA	Yes
Cayman Islands	KY	CYM	136	ISO 3166-2:KY	No
Central African Republic	CF	CAF	140	ISO 3166-2:CF	Yes
Chad	TD	TCD	148	ISO 3166-2:TD	Yes
Chile	CL	CHL	152	ISO 3166-2:CL	Yes
China	CN	CHN	156	ISO 3166-2:CN	Yes
Christmas Island	CX	CXR	162	ISO 3166-2:CX	No
Cocos (Keeling) Islands	CC	CCK	166	ISO 3166-2:CC	No
Colombia	CO	COL	170	ISO 3166-2:CO	Yes
Comoros	KM	COM	174	ISO 3166-2:KM	Yes
Congo	CG	COG	178	ISO 3166-2:CG	Yes
Congo, Democratic Republic of the	CD	COD	180	ISO 3166-2:CD	Yes
Cook Islands	CK	COK	184	ISO 3166-2:CK	No
Costa Rica	CR	CRI	188	ISO 3166-2:CR	Yes
Côte d'Ivoire	CI	CIV	384	ISO 3166-2:CI	Yes
Croatia	HR	HRV	191	ISO 3166-2:HR	Yes
Cuba	CU	CUB	192	ISO 3166-2:CU	Yes
Curaçao	CW	CUW	531	ISO 3166-2:CW	No
Cyprus	CY	CYP	196	ISO 3166-2:CY	Yes
Czechia	CZ	CZE	203	ISO 3166-2:CZ	Yes
Denmark	DK	DNK	208	ISO 3166-2:DK	Yes
Djibouti	DJ	DJI	262	ISO 3166-2:DJ	Yes
Dominica	DM	DMA	212	ISO 3166-2:DM	Yes
Dominican Republic	DO	DOM	214	ISO 3166-2:DO	Yes
Ecuador	EC	ECU	218	ISO 3166-2:EC	Yes
Egypt	EG	EGY	818	ISO 3166-2:EG	Yes
El Salvador	SV	SLV	222	ISO 3166-2:SV	Yes
Equatorial Guinea	GQ	GNQ	226	ISO 3166-2:GQ	Yes
Eritrea	ER	ERI	232	ISO 3166-2:ER	Yes
Estonia	EE	EST	233	ISO 3166-2:EE	Yes
Eswatini	SZ	SWZ	748	ISO 3166-2:SZ	Yes
Ethiopia	ET	ETH	231	ISO 3166-2:ET	Yes
Falkland Islands (Malvinas)	FK	FLK	238	ISO 3166-2:FK	No
Faroe Islands	FO	FRO	234	ISO 3166-2:FO	No
Fiji	FJ	FJI	242	ISO 3166-2:FJ	Yes
Finland	FI	FIN	246	ISO 3166-2:FI	Yes
France	FR	FRA	250	ISO 3166-2:FR	Yes
French Guiana	GF	GUF	254	ISO 3166-2:GF	No
French Polynesia	PF	PYF	258	ISO 3166-2:PF	No
French Southern Territories	TF	ATF	260	ISO 3166-2:TF	No
Gabon	GA	GAB	266	ISO 3166-2:GA	Yes
Gambia	GM	GMB	270	ISO 3166-2:GM	Yes
Georgia	GE	GEO	268	ISO 3166-2:GE	Yes
Germany	DE	DEU	276	ISO 3166-2:DE	Yes
Ghana	GH	GHA	288	ISO 3166-2:GH	Yes
Gibraltar	GI	GIB	292	ISO 3166-2:GI	No
Greece	GR	GRC	300	ISO 3166-2:GR	Yes
Greenland	GL	GRL	304	ISO 3166-2:GL	No
Grenada	GD	GRD	308	ISO 3166-2:GD	Yes
Guadeloupe	GP	GLP	312	ISO 3166-2:GP	No
Guam	GU	GUM	316	ISO 3166-2:GU	No
Guatemala	GT	GTM	320	ISO 3166-2:GT	Yes
Guernsey	GG	GGY	831	ISO 3166-2:GG	No
Guinea	GN	GIN	324	ISO 3166-2:GN	Yes
Guinea-Bissau	GW	GNB	624	ISO 3166-2:GW	Yes
Guyana	GY	GUY	328	ISO 3166-2:GY	Yes
Haiti	HT	HTI	332	ISO 3166-2:HT	Yes
Heard Island and McDonald Islands	HM	HMD	334	ISO 3166-2:HM	No
Holy See	VA	VAT	336	ISO 3166-2:VA	Yes
Honduras	HN	HND	340	ISO 3166-2:HN	Yes
Hong Kong	HK	HKG	344	ISO 3166-2:HK	No
Hungary	HU	HUN	348	ISO 3166-2:HU	Yes
Iceland	IS	ISL	352	ISO 3166-2:IS	Yes
India	IN	IND	356	ISO 3166-2:IN	Yes
Indonesia	ID	IDN	360	ISO 3166-2:ID	Yes
Iran, Islamic Republic of	IR	IRN	364	ISO 3166-2:IR	Yes
Iraq	IQ	IRQ	368	ISO 3166-2:IQ	Yes
Ireland	IE	IRL	372	ISO 3166-2:IE	Yes
Isle of Man	IM	IMN	833	ISO 3166-2:IM	No
Israel	IL	ISR	376	ISO 3166-2:IL	Yes
Italy	IT	ITA	380	ISO 3166-2:IT	Yes
Jamaica	JM	JAM	388	ISO 3166-2:JM	Yes
Japan	JP	JPN	392	ISO 3166-2:JP	Yes
Jersey	JE	JEY	832	ISO 3166-2:JE	No
Jordan	JO	JOR	400	ISO 3166-2:JO	Yes
Kazakhstan	KZ	KAZ	398	ISO 3166-2:KZ	Yes
Kenya	KE	KEN	404	ISO 3166-2:KE	Yes
Kiribati	KI	KIR	296	ISO 3166-2:KI	Yes
Korea, Democratic People's Republic of	KP	PRK	408	ISO 3166-2:KP	Yes
Korea, Republic of	KR	KOR	410	ISO 3166-2:KR	Yes
Kuwait	KW	KWT	414	ISO 3166-2:KW	Yes
Kyrgyzstan	KG	KGZ	417	ISO 3166-2:KG	Yes
Lao People's Democratic Republic	LA	LAO	418	ISO 3166-2:LA	Yes
Latvia	LV	LVA	428	ISO 3166-2:LV	Yes
Lebanon	LB	LBN	422	ISO 3166-2:LB	Yes
Lesotho	LS	LSO	426	ISO 3166-2:LS	Yes
Liberia	LR	LBR	430	ISO 3166-2:LR	Yes
Libya	LY	LBY	434	ISO 3166-2:LY	Yes
Liechtenstein	LI	LIE	438	ISO 3166-2:LI	Yes
Lithuania	LT	LTU	440	ISO 3166-2:LT	Yes
Luxembourg	LU	LUX	442	ISO 3166-2:LU	Yes
Macao	MO	MAC	446	ISO 3166-2:MO	No
Madagascar	MG	MDG	450	ISO 3166-2:MG	Yes
Malawi	MW	MWI	454	ISO 3166-2:MW	Yes
Malaysia	MY	MYS	458	ISO 3166-2:MY	Yes
Maldives	MV	MDV	462	ISO 3166-2:MV	Yes
Mali	ML	MLI	466	ISO 3166-2:ML	Yes
Malta	MT	MLT	470	ISO 3166-2:MT	Yes
Marshall Islands	MH	MHL	584	ISO 3166-2:MH	Yes
Martinique	MQ	MTQ	474	ISO 3166-2:MQ	No
Mauritania	MR	MRT	478	ISO 3166-2:MR	Yes
Mauritius	MU	MUS	480	ISO 3166-2:MU	Yes
Mayotte	YT	MYT	175	ISO 3166-2:YT	No
Mexico	MX	MEX	484	ISO 3166-2:MX	Yes
Micronesia, Federated States of	FM	FSM	583	ISO 3166-2:FM	Yes
Moldova, Republic of	MD	MDA	498	ISO 3166-2:MD	Yes
Monaco	MC	MCO	492	ISO 3166-2:MC	Yes
Mongolia	MN	MNG	496	ISO 3166-2:MN	Yes
Montenegro	ME	MNE	499	ISO 3166-2:ME	Yes
Montserrat	MS	MSR	500	ISO 3166-2:MS	No
Morocco	MA	MAR	504	ISO 3166-2:MA	Yes
Mozambique	MZ	MOZ	508	ISO 3166-2:MZ	Yes
Myanmar	MM	MMR	104	ISO 3166-2:MM	Yes
Namibia	NA	NAM	516	ISO 3166-2:NA	Yes
Naoero	NR	NRU	520	ISO 3166-2:NR	Yes
Nepal	NP	NPL	524	ISO 3166-2:NP	Yes
Netherlands, Kingdom of the	NL	NLD	528	ISO 3166-2:NL	Yes
New Caledonia	NC	NCL	540	ISO 3166-2:NC	No
New Zealand	NZ	NZL	554	ISO 3166-2:NZ	Yes
Nicaragua	NI	NIC	558	ISO 3166-2:NI	Yes
Niger	NE	NER	562	ISO 3166-2:NE	Yes
Nigeria	NG	NGA	566	ISO 3166-2:NG	Yes
Niue	NU	NIU	570	ISO 3166-2:NU	No
Norfolk Island	NF	NFK	574	ISO 3166-2:NF	No
North Macedonia	MK	MKD	807	ISO 3166-2:MK	Yes
Northern Mariana Islands	MP	MNP	580	ISO 3166-2:MP	No
Norway	NO	NOR	578	ISO 3166-2:NO	Yes
Oman	OM	OMN	512	ISO 3166-2:OM	Yes
Pakistan	PK	PAK	586	ISO 3166-2:PK	Yes
Palau	PW	PLW	585	ISO 3166-2:PW	Yes
Palestine, State of	PS	PSE	275	ISO 3166-2:PS	No
Panama	PA	PAN	591	ISO 3166-2:PA	Yes
Papua New Guinea	PG	PNG	598	ISO 3166-2:PG	Yes
Paraguay	PY	PRY	600	ISO 3166-2:PY	Yes
Peru	PE	PER	604	ISO 3166-2:PE	Yes
Philippines	PH	PHL	608	ISO 3166-2:PH	Yes
Pitcairn	PN	PCN	612	ISO 3166-2:PN	No
Poland	PL	POL	616	ISO 3166-2:PL	Yes
Portugal	PT	PRT	620	ISO 3166-2:PT	Yes
Puerto Rico	PR	PRI	630	ISO 3166-2:PR	No
Qatar	QA	QAT	634	ISO 3166-2:QA	Yes
Réunion	RE	REU	638	ISO 3166-2:RE	No
Romania	RO	ROU	642	ISO 3166-2:RO	Yes
Russian Federation	RU	RUS	643	ISO 3166-2:RU	Yes
Rwanda	RW	RWA	646	ISO 3166-2:RW	Yes
Saint Barthélemy	BL	BLM	652	ISO 3166-2:BL	No
Saint Helena, Ascension and Tristan da Cunha (Note: Comprising Saint Helena, Ascension Island, and Tristan da Cunha.)	SH	SHN	654	ISO 3166-2:SH	No
Saint Kitts and Nevis	KN	KNA	659	ISO 3166-2:KN	Yes
Saint Lucia	LC	LCA	662	ISO 3166-2:LC	Yes
Saint Martin (French part)	MF	MAF	663	ISO 3166-2:MF	No
Saint Pierre and Miquelon	PM	SPM	666	ISO 3166-2:PM	No
Saint Vincent and the Grenadines	VC	VCT	670	ISO 3166-2:VC	Yes
Samoa	WS	WSM	882	ISO 3166-2:WS	Yes
San Marino	SM	SMR	674	ISO 3166-2:SM	Yes
Sao Tome and Principe	ST	STP	678	ISO 3166-2:ST	Yes
Saudi Arabia	SA	SAU	682	ISO 3166-2:SA	Yes
Senegal	SN	SEN	686	ISO 3166-2:SN	Yes
Serbia	RS	SRB	688	ISO 3166-2:RS	Yes
Seychelles	SC	SYC	690	ISO 3166-2:SC	Yes
Sierra Leone	SL	SLE	694	ISO 3166-2:SL	Yes
Singapore	SG	SGP	702	ISO 3166-2:SG	Yes
Sint Maarten (Dutch part)	SX	SXM	534	ISO 3166-2:SX	No
Slovakia	SK	SVK	703	ISO 3166-2:SK	Yes
Slovenia	SI	SVN	705	ISO 3166-2:SI	Yes
Solomon Islands	SB	SLB	090	ISO 3166-2:SB	Yes
Somalia	SO	SOM	706	ISO 3166-2:SO	Yes
South Africa	ZA	ZAF	710	ISO 3166-2:ZA	Yes
South Georgia and the South Sandwich Islands	GS	SGS	239	ISO 3166-2:GS	No
South Sudan	SS	SSD	728	ISO 3166-2:SS	Yes
Spain	ES	ESP	724	ISO 3166-2:ES	Yes
Sri Lanka	LK	LKA	144	ISO 3166-2:LK	Yes
Sudan	SD	SDN	729	ISO 3166-2:SD	Yes
Suriname	SR	SUR	740	ISO 3166-2:SR	Yes
Svalbard and Jan Mayen (Note: Comprising Svalbard and Jan Mayen.)	SJ	SJM	744	ISO 3166-2:SJ	No
Sweden	SE	SWE	752	ISO 3166-2:SE	Yes
Switzerland	CH	CHE	756	ISO 3166-2:CH	Yes
Syrian Arab Republic	SY	SYR	760	ISO 3166-2:SY	Yes
Taiwan, Province of China	TW	TWN	158	ISO 3166-2:TW	No
Tajikistan	TJ	TJK	762	ISO 3166-2:TJ	Yes
Tanzania, United Republic of	TZ	TZA	834	ISO 3166-2:TZ	Yes
Thailand	TH	THA	764	ISO 3166-2:TH	Yes
Timor-Leste	TL	TLS	626	ISO 3166-2:TL	Yes
Togo	TG	TGO	768	ISO 3166-2:TG	Yes
Tokelau	TK	TKL	772	ISO 3166-2:TK	No
Tonga	TO	TON	776	ISO 3166-2:TO	Yes
Trinidad and Tobago	TT	TTO	780	ISO 3166-2:TT	Yes
Tunisia	TN	TUN	788	ISO 3166-2:TN	Yes
Türkiye	TR	TUR	792	ISO 3166-2:TR	Yes
Turkmenistan	TM	TKM	795	ISO 3166-2:TM	Yes
Turks and Caicos Islands	TC	TCA	796	ISO 3166-2:TC	No
Tuvalu	TV	TUV	798	ISO 3166-2:TV	Yes
Uganda	UG	UGA	800	ISO 3166-2:UG	Yes
Ukraine	UA	UKR	804	ISO 3166-2:UA	Yes
United Arab Emirates	AE	ARE	784	ISO 3166-2:AE	Yes
United Kingdom of Great Britain and Northern Ireland	GB	GBR	826	ISO 3166-2:GB	Yes
United States of America	US	USA	840	ISO 3166-2:US	Yes
United States Minor Outlying Islands (Note: Comprising Baker Island, Howland Island, Jarvis Island, Johnston Atoll, Kingman Reef, Midway Atoll, Navassa Island, Palmyra Atoll, and Wake Island.)	UM	UMI	581	ISO 3166-2:UM	No
Uruguay	UY	URY	858	ISO 3166-2:UY	Yes
Uzbekistan	UZ	UZB	860	ISO 3166-2:UZ	Yes
Vanuatu	VU	VUT	548	ISO 3166-2:VU	Yes
Venezuela, Bolivarian Republic of	VE	VEN	862	ISO 3166-2:VE	Yes
Viet Nam	VN	VNM	704	ISO 3166-2:VN	Yes
Virgin Islands (British)	VG	VGB	092	ISO 3166-2:VG	No
Virgin Islands (U.S.)	VI	VIR	850	ISO 3166-2:VI	No
Wallis and Futuna	WF	WLF	876	ISO 3166-2:WF	No
Western Sahara	EH	ESH	732	ISO 3166-2:EH	No
Yemen	YE	YEM	887	ISO 3166-2:YE	Yes
Zambia	ZM	ZMB	894	ISO 3166-2:ZM	Yes
Zimbabwe	ZW	ZWE	716	ISO 3166-2:ZW	Yes

=== Reserved and user-assigned code elements ===
The officially assigned code elements may be expanded by using either reserved codes or user-assigned codes.

Reserved code elements are codes which have become obsolete, are used in other coding systems such as WIPO ST.3, or are required in order to enable a particular user application of the standard but do not qualify for inclusion in ISO 3166-1. To avoid transitional application problems and to aid users who require specific additional code elements for the functioning of their coding systems, the ISO 3166/MA, when justified, reserves these codes for a certain use for a limited or indeterminate period of time. Codes are usually reserved for former countries, overseas territories, international organizations, and special nationality status. The reserved alpha-2 and alpha-3 codes can be divided into three categories:
(follow the links for the reserved codes of each category)

- Alpha-2: exceptional reservations, transitional reservations, and indeterminate reservations
- Alpha-3: exceptional reservations, transitional reservations, and indeterminate reservations
- Numeric: no reserved codes

User-assigned code elements are codes at the disposal of users who need to add further names of countries, territories, or other geographical entities to their in-house application of ISO 3166-1, and the ISO 3166/MA will never use these codes when updating the standard. These codes can be user-assigned:

- Alpha-2: AA, QM to QZ, XA to XZ, and ZZ
- Alpha-3: AAA to AAZ, QMA to QZZ, XAA to XZZ, and ZZA to ZZZ
- Numeric: 900 to 999

==== User-assigned codes in wide use ====
- XI: Used to denote Northern Ireland for the purposes of VAT collection in trade between it and the European Union.
- XK: Used to denote Kosovo- see XK (user assigned code).

== Changes ==
The ISO 3166/MA updates ISO 3166-1 when necessary. A country is normally assigned new ISO 3166-1 codes if it changes its name or its territorial boundaries. In general, new alphabetic codes are assigned if a country changes a significant part of its name, while a new numeric code is assigned if a country changes its territorial boundaries. Codes for country names that have been deleted from ISO 3166-1 are published in ISO 3166-3.

ISO formerly announced changes in newsletters which updated the standard, and periodically released new editions which consolidated the newsletter changes. As of July 2013, changes are published in the online catalogue of ISO only, and newsletters are no longer published. Past newsletters remain available via the search option on the ISO website.

Edition/Newsletter	Date issued	Contents
ISO 3166:1974	1974	First edition of ISO 3166
ISO 3166:1981	1981	Second edition of ISO 3166
ISO 3166:1988	1988-08-15	Third edition of ISO 3166
ISO 3166:1994	1994-02-10	Fourth edition of ISO 3166
ISO 3166-1:1997	1997-09-25	First edition of ISO 3166-1 (ISO 3166 expanded into three parts)
Newsletter V-1	1998-02-05	Change of official name (Samoa)
Newsletter V-2	1999-10-01	Inclusion of new country name and code elements (Palestinian Territory, Occupied)
Newsletter V-3	2002-02-01	Change of alpha-3 Code Element (Romania)
Newsletter V-4	2002-05-20	Name changes (Afghanistan, Azerbaijan, Bahrain, Bosnia and Herzegovina, Fiji, Hong Kong, Kazakhstan, Kiribati, Macao, Niue, Somalia, Venezuela)
Newsletter V-5	2002-05-20	Change of names and alphabetical code elements of East Timor
Newsletter V-6	2002-11-15	Change of names of East Timor
Newsletter V-7	2003-01-14	Change of official name of Comoros
Newsletter V-8	2003-07-23	Deletion of "Yugoslavia"; inclusion of "Serbia and Montenegro" with new alphabetical code elements
Newsletter V-9	2004-02-13	Inclusion of an entry for Åland Islands
Newsletter V-10	2004-04-26	Name changes (Afghanistan, Åland Islands)
Newsletter V-11	2006-03-29	Inclusion of an entry for Jersey, Guernsey and Isle of Man. Change of remark for the United Kingdom
Newsletter V-12	2006-09-26	Inclusion of the new entries for "Serbia" and "Montenegro" (replacing Serbia and Montenegro)
ISO 3166-1:2006	2006-11-20	Second edition of ISO 3166-1
ISO 3166-1:2006/ Cor 1:2007	2007-07-15	First Technical Corrigendum to ISO 3166-1:2006
Newsletter VI-1	2007-09-21	Assignment of code elements for Saint Barthélemy and Saint Martin and update of France and other French Territories (French Polynesia, French Southern Territories, Guadeloupe, Réunion)
Newsletter VI-2	2008-03-31	Name changes for Moldova, Montenegro and other minor corrections (Madagascar, Palestinian Territory, Occupied, Saint Barthélemy)
Newsletter VI-3	2008-09-09	Name change for Nepal and other minor corrections (Greenland, Guernsey, Moldova, Nigeria)
Newsletter VI-4	2009-01-07	Name change for the Republic of Moldova and other minor corrections (Central African Republic, Comoros)
Newsletter VI-5	2009-03-03	Name change for Bolivarian Republic of Venezuela and other minor corrections (Kiribati, Tuvalu)
Newsletter VI-6	2009-05-08	Name change for Plurinational State of Bolivia
Newsletter VI-7	2010-02-22	Name change for Saint Helena, Ascension and Tristan da Cunha
Newsletter VI-8	2010-12-15	Code elements for Bonaire, Saint Eustatius and Saba, Curaçao and Sint Maarten (Dutch part), update of other territories (Netherlands, Netherlands Antilles) and minor corrections (Bosnia and Herzegovina, Croatia)
Newsletter VI-9	2011-06-12 (corrected 2011-07-14)	Name changes for Fiji and Myanmar as well as other minor corrections (Åland Islands, Bonaire, Sint Eustatius and Saba, Bulgaria, Netherlands, Niue)
Newsletter VI-10	2011-08-09	Code elements for South Sudan (and new numeric code for Sudan)
Newsletter VI-11	2011-11-08	Name change for Libya
Newsletter VI-12	2012-02-15	Name change for Hungary and other minor corrections (Bangladesh, Bonaire, Sint Eustatius and Saba, Central African Republic, Equatorial Guinea, Eritrea, Germany)
Newsletter VI-13	2012-08-02	Name change for Eritrea and other minor corrections (Germany, Sri Lanka)
Newsletter VI-14	2013-02-06	Name change for State of Palestine and other minor corrections (Bulgaria, Bouvet Island, Jersey, Saint Martin (French part), Seychelles, Sint Maarten (Dutch part), Viet Nam)
Newsletter VI-15	2013-05-10	Name change for Papua New Guinea
Newsletter VI-16	2013-07-11	Name change for Somalia
ISO 3166-1:2013	2013-11-19	Third edition of ISO 3166-1 (changes are published in the online catalogue of ISO only and no newsletters are published anymore).
ISO 3166-1:2020	2020-08	Fourth edition of ISO 3166-1

== See also ==
- Country code
  - International Organization for Standardization
    - ISO 3166
      - ISO 3166-1
      - ISO 3166-2
      - ISO 3166-3
    - List of ISO 3166 country codes
  - International vehicle registration code
  - Country code top-level domain
    - List of Internet top-level domains
- ISO 639 – Codes for the representation of names of languages
- Lists of countries and territories
  - Sovereign state
    - List of sovereign states
    - List of states with limited recognition
  - Dependent territory
  - Timeline of historical geopolitical changes
- United Nations
  - Member states of the United Nations
  - United Nations list of non-self-governing territories
- List of IOC country codes
- List of CGF country codes

== Sources and external links ==
- ISO 3166 Maintenance Agency, International Organization for Standardization (ISO)..
  - Country names and code elements — list of alpha-2 codes..
- Standard Country or Area Codes for Statistical Use, United Nations Statistics Division..
  - Countries or areas, codes and abbreviations — list of alpha-3 and numeric codes (a few territories officially assigned codes in ISO 3166-1 are not included in this list)..
- The World Factbook (public domain), Central Intelligence Agency
  - Appendix D – Country Data Codes — comparison of GEC (formerly FIPS 10-4), ISO 3166, and STANAG 1059 country codes..
