= ISO 3166-2:AQ =

Entry for Antarctica in ISO 3166-2

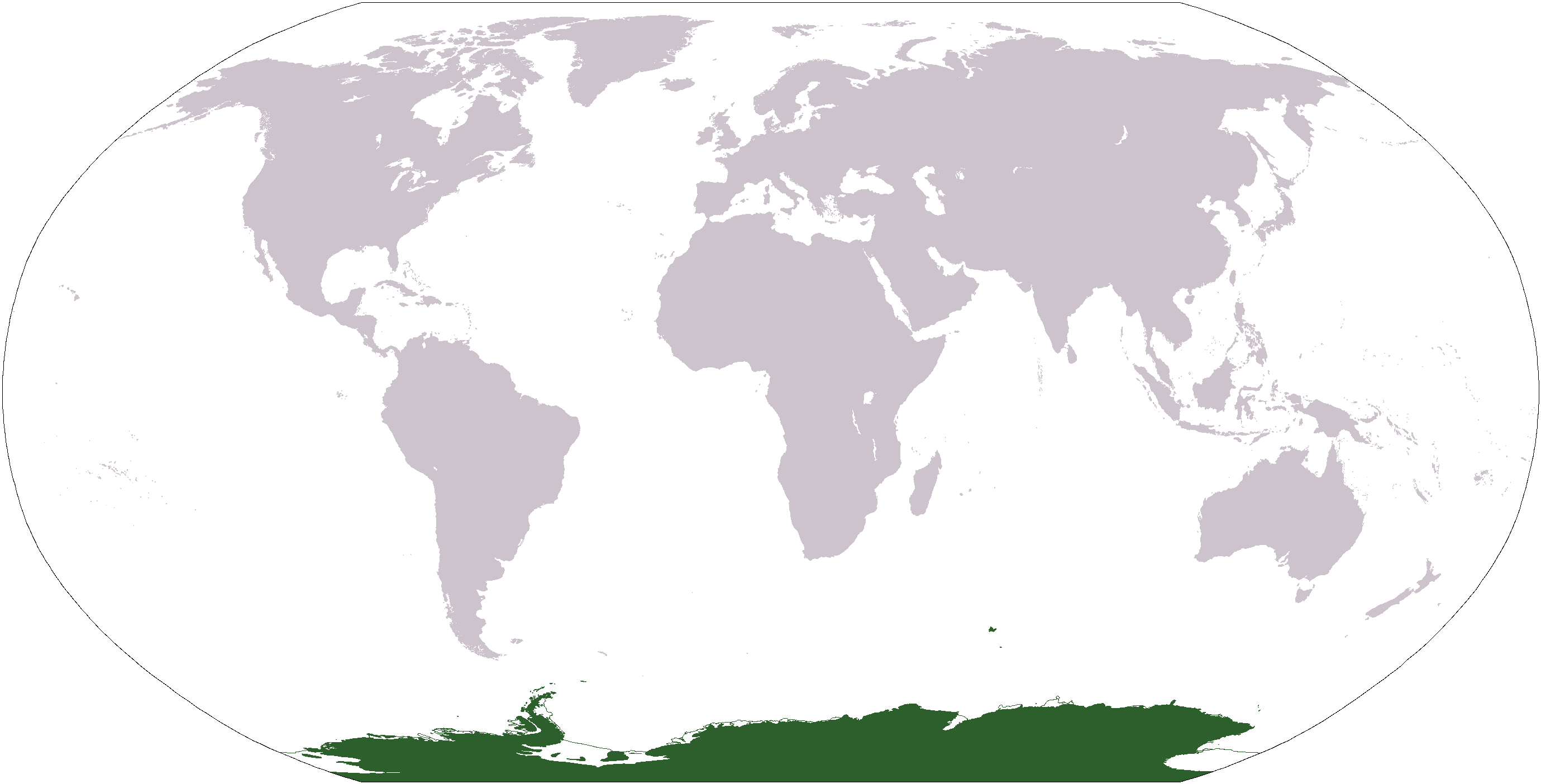
Antarctica

ISO 3166-2:AQ is the entry for Antarctica in ISO 3166-2, part of the ISO 3166 standard published by the International Organization for Standardization (ISO), which defines codes for the names of the principal subdivisions (e.g., provinces or states) of all countries coded in ISO 3166-1.

Currently no ISO 3166-2 codes are defined in the entry for Antarctica.

Antarctica, defined as the territories south of 60°S, is officially assigned the ISO 3166-1 alpha-2 code AQ.

== See also ==
- Territorial claims of Antarctica
