= ISO 3166-2:RE =

Entry for Réunion in ISO 3166-2

ISO 3166-2:RE is the entry for Réunion in ISO 3166-2, part of the ISO 3166 standard published by the International Organization for Standardization (ISO), which defines codes for the names of the principal subdivisions (e.g., provinces or states) of all countries coded in ISO 3166-1.

Currently no ISO 3166-2 codes are defined in the entry for Réunion.

Réunion, an overseas region and department of France, is officially assigned the ISO 3166-1 alpha-2 code RE. Moreover, it is also assigned the ISO 3166-2 code FR-974 under the entry for France.

== See also ==
- Subdivisions of Réunion
