= ISO 3166-2:US =

Entry for the United States in ISO 3166-2

ISO 3166-2:US is the entry for the United States in ISO 3166-2, part of the ISO 3166 standard published by the International Organization for Standardization (ISO), which defines codes for the names of the principal subdivisions (e.g., provinces or states) of all countries coded in ISO 3166-1.

Currently for the United States, ISO 3166-2 codes are defined for the following subdivisions:

- 50 states
- one district (i.e., the District of Columbia, the capital of the country, also known as Washington, D.C.)
- six insular areas (including the U.S. Minor Outlying Islands, a collection of nine islands or groups of islands). (The subdivision category name used to refer to the grouping of insular areas is "outlying area" per the standard, but these locales are not "outlying" from a local perspective.)

Each code consists of two parts separated by a hyphen. The first part is US, the ISO 3166-1 alpha-2 code of the United States. The second part is two letters, which is the postal abbreviation of the state, district, or outlying area, except the United States Minor Outlying Islands which do not have a postal abbreviation.

== Current codes ==
Subdivision names are listed as in the ISO 3166-2 standard published by the ISO 3166 Maintenance Agency (ISO 3166/MA).

Map of the United States with each state and the District of Columbia labelled with the second part of its ISO 3166-2 code

Code	Subdivision name in English	Subdivision category
US-AL	Alabama	State
US-AK	Alaska	State
US-AZ	Arizona	State
US-AR	Arkansas	State
US-CA	California	State
US-CO	Colorado	State
US-CT	Connecticut	State
US-DE	Delaware	State
US-FL	Florida	State
US-GA	Georgia	State
US-HI	Hawaii	State
US-ID	Idaho	State
US-IL	Illinois	State
US-IN	Indiana	State
US-IA	Iowa	State
US-KS	Kansas	State
US-KY	Kentucky	State
US-LA	Louisiana	State
US-ME	Maine	State
US-MD	Maryland	State
US-MA	Massachusetts	State
US-MI	Michigan	State
US-MN	Minnesota	State
US-MS	Mississippi	State
US-MO	Missouri	State
US-MT	Montana	State
US-NE	Nebraska	State
US-NV	Nevada	State
US-NH	New Hampshire	State
US-NJ	New Jersey	State
US-NM	New Mexico	State
US-NY	New York	State
US-NC	North Carolina	State
US-ND	North Dakota	State
US-OH	Ohio	State
US-OK	Oklahoma	State
US-OR	Oregon	State
US-PA	Pennsylvania	State
US-RI	Rhode Island	State
US-SC	South Carolina	State
US-SD	South Dakota	State
US-TN	Tennessee	State
US-TX	Texas	State
US-UT	Utah	State
US-VT	Vermont	State
US-VA	Virginia	State
US-WA	Washington	State
US-WV	West Virginia	State
US-WI	Wisconsin	State
US-WY	Wyoming	State
US-DC	District of Columbia	District
US-AS	American Samoa	Outlying area
US-GU	Guam	Outlying area
US-MP	Northern Mariana Islands	Outlying area
US-PR	Puerto Rico	Outlying area
US-UM	United States Minor Outlying Islands	Outlying area
US-VI	Virgin Islands, U.S.	Outlying area

== Subdivisions included in ISO 3166-1 ==
Besides being included as subdivisions of the United States in ISO 3166-2, the outlying areas are also officially assigned their own country codes in ISO 3166-1.

Code	Subdivision name in English	Alpha-2 code	ISO 3166-2 codes
US-AS	American Samoa	AS	ISO 3166-2:AS
US-GU	Guam	GU	ISO 3166-2:GU
US-MP	Northern Mariana Islands	MP	ISO 3166-2:MP
US-PR	Puerto Rico	PR	ISO 3166-2:PR
US-UM	United States Minor Outlying Islands	UM	ISO 3166-2:UM
US-VI	United States Virgin Islands	VI	ISO 3166-2:VI

== See also ==
- FIPS region codes of United States
- FIPS state codes of the United States
- Political divisions of the United States
- Neighboring countries: CA, MX
