= ISO 3166-2:HK =

Entry for Hong Kong in ISO 3166-2

ISO 3166-2:HK is the entry for Hong Kong in ISO 3166-2, which was published in 1998 by the International Organization for Standardization (ISO) to define codes for the names of the principal administrative subdivisions of all countries coded in ISO 3166-1 (first published by the ISO in 1974).

Hong Kong itself has both its own ISO 3166-1 top-level code, HK (which itself has no ISO 3166-2 subdivisions listed) and a subdivision code of China, as CN-HK.

== See also ==
- Subdivisions of Hong Kong
- Neighbouring country: CN
