= ISO 3166-2:GI =

Entry for Gibraltar in ISO 3166-2

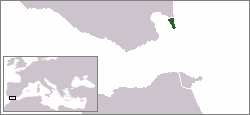
Gibraltar highlighted on a map

ISO 3166-2:GI is the entry for Gibraltar in ISO 3166-2, part of the ISO 3166 standard published by the International Organization for Standardization (ISO), which defines codes for the names of the principal subdivisions (e.g., provinces or states) of all countries coded in ISO 3166-1.

Currently no ISO 3166-2 codes are defined in the entry for Gibraltar. The territory has no defined subdivisions.

Gibraltar is officially assigned the ISO 3166-1 alpha-2 code GI.

== See also ==
- Neighbouring country: ES
