= ISO 3166-2:PF =

Entry for French Polynesia in ISO 3166-2

ISO 3166-2:PF is the entry for French Polynesia in ISO 3166-2, part of the ISO 3166 standard published by the International Organization for Standardization (ISO), which defines codes for the names of the principal subdivisions (e.g., provinces or states) of all countries coded in ISO 3166-1.

Currently no ISO 3166-2 codes are defined in the entry for French Polynesia.

French Polynesia, an overseas territorial collectivity of France, is officially assigned the ISO 3166-1 alpha-2 code PF. Moreover, it is also assigned the ISO 3166-2 code FR-PF under the entry for France.

== See also ==
- Subdivisions of French Polynesia
