= ISO 3166-2:GS =

Entry for South Georgia and the South Sandwich Islands in ISO 3166-2

ISO 3166-2:GS is the entry for South Georgia and the South Sandwich Islands in ISO 3166-2, part of the ISO 3166 standard published by the International Organization for Standardization (ISO), which defines codes for the names of the principal subdivisions (e.g., provinces or states) of all countries coded in ISO 3166-1.

Currently no ISO 3166-2 codes are defined in the entry for South Georgia and the South Sandwich Islands. The territory has no defined subdivisions.

South Georgia and the South Sandwich Islands is officially assigned the ISO 3166-1 alpha-2 code GS.
