= ISO 3166-2:MP =

Entry for the North Mariana Islands in ISO 3166-2

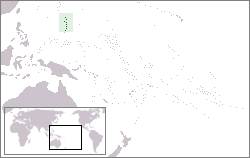
Location of the Northern Mariana Islands

ISO 3166-2:MP is the entry for the Northern Mariana Islands in ISO 3166-2, part of the ISO 3166 standard published by the International Organization for Standardization (ISO), which defines codes for the names of the principal subdivisions (e.g., provinces or states) of all countries coded in ISO 3166-1. "MP" stands for "Marianas Pacific".

Currently no ISO 3166-2 codes are defined in the entry for the Northern Mariana Islands.

The Northern Mariana Islands, an outlying area of the United States, are officially assigned the ISO 3166-1 alpha-2 code MP. Moreover, it is also assigned the ISO 3166-2 code US-MP under the entry for the United States.

== See also ==
- Subdivisions of the Northern Mariana Islands
