= ISO 3166-2:MS =

Entry for Montserrat in ISO 3166-2

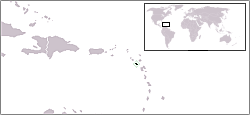
Location of Montserrat

ISO 3166-2:MS is the entry for Montserrat in ISO 3166-2, part of the ISO 3166 standard published by the International Organization for Standardization (ISO), which defines codes for the names of the principal subdivisions (e.g., provinces or states) of all countries coded in ISO 3166-1.

Currently no ISO 3166-2 codes are defined in the entry for Montserrat.

Montserrat is officially assigned the ISO 3166-1 alpha-2 code MS.

== See also ==
- Subdivisions of Montserrat
- FIPS region codes of Montserrat
