= ISO 3166-2:AS =

Entry for American Samoa in ISO 3166-2

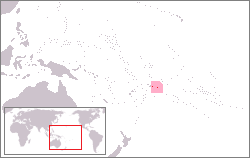

ISO 3166-2:AS is the entry for American Samoa in ISO 3166-2, part of the ISO 3166 standard published by the International Organization for Standardization (ISO), which defines codes for the names of the principal subdivisions (e.g., provinces or states) of all countries coded in ISO 3166-1.

Currently no ISO 3166-2 codes are defined in the entry for American Samoa.

American Samoa, an outlying area of the United States, is officially assigned the ISO 3166-1 alpha-2 code AS. Moreover, it is also assigned the ISO 3166-2 code US-AS under the entry for the United States.

== See also ==
- Subdivisions of American Samoa
