= ISO 3166-2:BL =

Entry for Saint Barthélemy in ISO 3166-2

ISO 3166-2:BL is the entry for Saint Barthélemy in ISO 3166-2, part of the ISO 3166 standard published by the International Organization for Standardization (ISO), which defines codes for the names of the principal subdivisions (e.g., provinces or states) of all countries coded in ISO 3166-1.

Currently no ISO 3166-2 codes are defined in the entry for Saint Barthélemy. The territory has no defined subdivisions.

Saint Barthélemy, an overseas territorial collectivity of France, is officially assigned the ISO 3166-1 alpha-2 code BL since 2007, after its secession from Guadeloupe. Moreover, it is also assigned the ISO 3166-2 code FR-BL under the entry for France.

== Changes ==
The following changes to the entry have been announced in newsletters by the ISO 3166/MA since the first publication of ISO 3166-2 in 1998:

Newsletter	Date issued	Description of change in newsletter
Newsletter I-9	2007-11-28	Addition of new entry (in accordance with ISO 3166-1 Newsletter VI-1)
