= ISO 3166-2:KY =

Entry for the Cayman Islands in ISO 3166-2

ISO 3166-2:KY is the entry for the Cayman Islands in ISO 3166-2, part of the ISO 3166 standard published by the International Organization for Standardization (ISO), which defines codes for the names of the principal subdivisions (e.g., provinces or states) of all countries coded in ISO 3166-1.

Currently no second level ISO 3166-2 codes are defined in the entry for the Cayman Islands.

The Cayman Islands are officially assigned the ISO 3166-1 alpha-2 code KY.

This two character string is most commonly associated with the Cayman Island's official internet domain name extension .ky

== See also ==
- Subdivisions of the Cayman Islands
- FIPS region codes of the Cayman Islands
