= ISO 3166-2:TF =

Entry for the French Southern Territories in ISO 3166-2

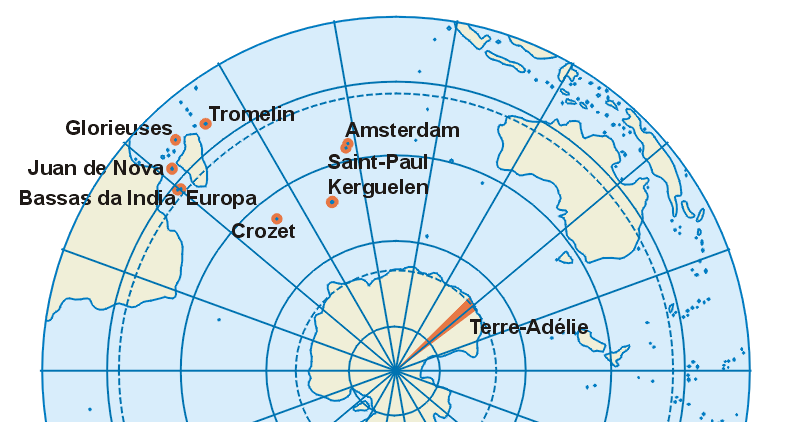
Map of the French Southern and Antarctic Territories.

ISO 3166-2:TF is the entry for the French Southern Territories (French Southern and Antarctic Lands) in ISO 3166-2, a part of the ISO 3166 standard which defines codes for the principal subdivisions of all countries included in ISO 3166-1. Currently, the entry does not include any codes.

The French Southern and Antarctic Lands is an overseas territorial collectivity of France and are officially assigned the ISO 3166-1 alpha-2 code TF. As an internal territory, it is also assigned the ISO 3166-2 code FR-TF under the entry for France.

Under the definition in ISO 3166-1, the French Southern and Antarctic Lands excludes Adélie Land, which is covered by Antarctica, with alpha-2 code AQ.

== See also ==
- Subdivisions of the French Southern Territories
