= ISO 3166-2:UM =

Entry for the United States Minor Outlying Islands in ISO 3166-2

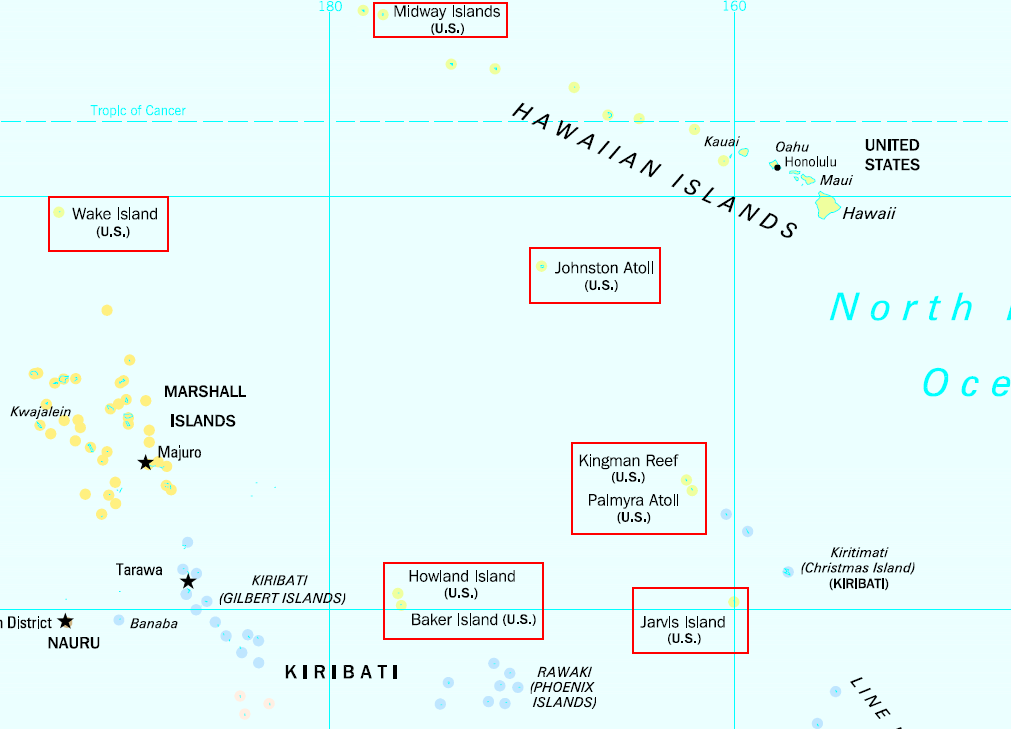
The United States Minor Outlying Islands of the Pacific Ocean

ISO 3166-2:UM is the entry for the United States Minor Outlying Islands in ISO 3166-2, a part of the ISO 3166 standard published by the International Organization for Standardization (ISO), which defines codes for the names of the principal subdivisions (e.g., provinces or states) of all countries coded in ISO 3166-1. Currently, the United States Minor Outlying Islands has ISO 3166-2 codes defined for its nine subdivisions. As an outlying area of the United States, the United States Minor Outlying Islands are also assigned the ISO 3166-2 code US-UM under the entry for the United States, ISO 3-166-2:US.

Each code consists of two parts, separated by a hyphen. The first part is UM, the ISO 3166-1 alpha-2 code of the United States Minor Outlying Islands. The second part is two digits, which is the old FIPS 5-2 numeric code of the island or group of islands. ISO 3166-2:UM does not include Bajo Nuevo Bank and Serranilla Bank in the Caribbean Sea, both of which are claimed by the United States but administered by Colombia.

== Codes ==
Subdivision names are listed as in the ISO 3166-2 standard published by the ISO 3166 Maintenance Agency (ISO 3166/MA).

Click on the button in the header to sort each column.

Code	Subdivision name in English
UM-81	Baker Island
UM-84	Howland Island
UM-86	Jarvis Island
UM-67	Johnston Atoll
UM-89	Kingman Reef
UM-71	Midway Islands
UM-76	Navassa Island
UM-95	Palmyra Atoll
UM-79	Wake Island

== See also ==
- FIPS country codes, where each island or group of islands is assigned a code
