= ISO 3166-2:PR =

Entry for Puerto Rico in ISO 3166-2

ISO 3166-2:PR is the entry for Puerto Rico in ISO 3166-2, part of the ISO 3166 standard published by the International Organization for Standardization (ISO), which defines codes for the names of the principal subdivisions (e.g., provinces or states) of all countries coded in ISO 3166-1.

Currently no ISO 3166-2 codes are defined in the entry for Puerto Rico.

Puerto Rico, an insular area of the United States, is officially assigned the ISO 3166-1 alpha-2 code PR. Moreover, it is also assigned the ISO 3166-2 code US-PR under the entry for the United States.

== See also ==
- Municipalities of Puerto Rico
