= ISO 3166-2:AX =

Entry for the Åland Islands in ISO 3166-2

ISO 3166-2:AX is the entry for the Åland Islands in ISO 3166-2, part of the ISO 3166 standard published by the International Organization for Standardization (ISO), which defines codes for the names of the principal subdivisions (e.g., provinces or states) of all countries coded in ISO 3166-1.

Currently no ISO 3166-2 codes are defined in the entry for the Åland Islands.

Åland, an autonomous region of Finland (also a former province), is officially assigned the ISO 3166-1 alpha-2 code AX since 2004 (see ISO 3166-1 Newsletter V-9). Moreover, it is also assigned the ISO 3166-2 code FI-01 under the entry for Finland.

== See also ==
- Municipalities of Åland
- Regions of Finland
- Neighbouring country: SE
