= ISO 3166-2:PN =

Entry for the Pitcairn Islands in ISO 3166-2

ISO 3166-2:PN is the entry for the Pitcairn Islands in ISO 3166-2, part of the ISO 3166 standard published by the International Organization for Standardization (ISO), which defines codes for the names of the principal subdivisions (e.g., provinces or states) of all countries coded in ISO 3166-1.

Currently no ISO 3166-2 codes are defined in the entry for the Pitcairn Islands. The territory has no defined subdivisions.

The Pitcairn Islands are officially assigned the ISO 3166-1 alpha-2 code PN.
