= ISO 3166-2:FK =

Entry for the Falkland Islands in ISO 3166-2

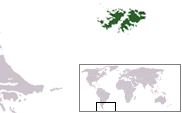
Location of the Falkland Islands

ISO 3166-2:FK is the entry for the Falkland Islands in ISO 3166-2, part of the ISO 3166 standard published by the International Organization for Standardization (ISO), which defines codes for the names of the principal subdivisions (e.g., provinces or states) of all countries coded in ISO 3166-1.

Currently no ISO 3166-2 codes are defined in the entry for the Falkland Islands. The territory has no defined subdivisions.

The Falkland Islands are officially assigned the ISO 3166-1 alpha-2 code FK and named "FALKLAND ISLANDS (MALVINAS)" in upper case or "Falkland Islands (the) [Malvinas]" in not only lower case short name but also local short name in ISO 3166 as the United Kingdom administers the Falkland Islands and Argentina claims this group of islands as Malvinas.
