= ISO 3166-2:IO =

Entry for the British Indian Ocean Territory in ISO 3166-2

ISO 3166-2:IO is the entry for the British Indian Ocean Territory in ISO 3166-2, part of the ISO 3166 standard published by the International Organization for Standardization (ISO), which defines codes for the names of the principal subdivisions (e.g., provinces or states) of all countries coded in ISO 3166-1.

Currently no ISO 3166-2 codes are defined in the entry for the British Indian Ocean Territory. The territory has no defined subdivisions.

The British Indian Ocean Territory is officially assigned the ISO 3166-1 alpha-2 code IO. Diego Garcia, its largest island, is exceptionally reserved the ISO 3166-1 alpha-2 code DG on the request of the International Telecommunication Union.
