= ISO 3166-2:AN =

Former entry for the Netherlands Antilles in ISO 3166-2

ISO 3166-2:AN was the entry for the Netherlands Antilles in ISO 3166-2, part of the ISO 3166 standard published by the International Organization for Standardization (ISO), which defines codes for the names of the principal subdivisions (e.g., provinces or states) of all countries coded in ISO 3166-1.

The Netherlands Antilles was officially assigned the ISO 3166-1 alpha-2 code AN before it was dissolved into five separate territories in 2010, and the entry has been deleted from ISO 3166-1 as a result. Curaçao and Sint Maarten, which became "countries" in the Kingdom of the Netherlands, are now assigned the ISO 3166-1 alpha-2 codes CW and SX respectively. Bonaire, Sint Eustatius, and Saba, which became "special municipalities" of the Netherlands, are now assigned the ISO 3166-1 alpha-2 code BQ under the collective entry "Bonaire, Sint Eustatius and Saba".

No ISO 3166-2 codes were ever defined in the entry for the Netherlands Antilles.

== Changes ==
The following changes to the entry had been announced in newsletters by the ISO 3166/MA since the first publication of ISO 3166-2 in 1998:

| Newsletter | Date issued | Description of change in newsletter |
|---|---|---|
| Newsletter II-3 | 2011-12-13 (corrected 2011-12-15) | Deletion of code to align ISO 3166-1 and ISO 3166-2 |

== See also ==
- Subdivisions of the Netherlands Antilles
- ISO 3166-2:BQ (current code for Bonaire, Sint Eustatius and Saba)
- ISO 3166-2:CW (current code for Curaçao)
- ISO 3166-2:SX (current code for Sint Maarten)
- Neighbouring country: FR (MF)
