= ISO 3166-2:MZ =

Entry for Mozambique in ISO 3166-2

ISO 3166-2:MZ is the entry for Mozambique in ISO 3166-2, part of the ISO 3166 standard published by the International Organization for Standardization (ISO), which defines codes for the names of the principal subdivisions (e.g., provinces or states) of all countries coded in ISO 3166-1.

Currently for Mozambique, ISO 3166-2 codes are defined for one city and ten provinces. The city Maputo is the capital of the country and has special status equal to the provinces.

Each code consists of two parts separated by a hyphen. The first part is MZ, the ISO 3166-1 alpha-2 code of Mozambique. The second part is either of the following:

- one letter: provinces
- three letters: city

== Current codes ==
Subdivision names are listed as in the ISO 3166-2 standard published by the ISO 3166 Maintenance Agency (ISO 3166/MA).

Click on the button in the header to sort each column.

Map of Mozambique with the province highlighted

Code	Subdivision name (pt)	Subdivision category	Map ref. nr
MZ-P	Cabo Delgado	province	2
MZ-G	Gaza	province	8
MZ-I	Inhambane	province	9
MZ-B	Manica	province	6
MZ-MPM	Maputo	city	10
MZ-L	Maputo	province	11
MZ-N	Nampula	province	3
MZ-A	Niassa	province	1
MZ-S	Sofala	province	7
MZ-T	Tete	province	4
MZ-Q	Zambézia	province	5

== See also ==
- Subdivisions of Mozambique
- FIPS region codes of Mozambique
- Neighbouring countries: MW, SZ, TZ, ZA, ZM, ZW
