= ISO 3166-2:LS =

Entry for Lesotho in ISO 3166-2

ISO 3166-2:LS is the entry for Lesotho in ISO 3166-2, part of the ISO 3166 standard published by the International Organization for Standardization (ISO), which defines codes for the names of the principal subdivisions (e.g., provinces or states) of all countries coded in ISO 3166-1.

Currently for Lesotho, ISO 3166-2 codes are defined for ten districts.

Each code consists of two parts separated by a hyphen. The first part is LS, the ISO 3166-1 alpha-2 code of Lesotho. The second part is a letter (A–K except I).

== Current codes ==
Subdivision names are listed as in the ISO 3166-2 standard published by the ISO 3166 Maintenance Agency (ISO 3166/MA).

Click on the button in the header to sort each column.

Code	Subdivision name (en, st)	Local variant
LS-D	Berea	
LS-B	Botha-Bothe	Butha-Buthe
LS-C	Leribe	
LS-E	Mafeteng	
LS-A	Maseru	
LS-F	Mohale's Hoek	
LS-J	Mokhotlong	
LS-H	Qacha's Nek	
LS-G	Quthing	
LS-K	Thaba-Tseka	

== Changes ==
The following changes to the entry have been announced in newsletters by the ISO 3166/MA since the first publication of ISO 3166-2 in 1998:

Newsletter	Date issued	Description of change in newsletter
Newsletter II-3	2011-12-13 (corrected 2011-12-15)	Addition of local generic administrative term, update of the official languages according to ISO 3166-2 and source list update.
Online Browsing Platform (OBP)	2020-11-24	Change of spelling of LS-B; Addition of local variation of LS-B; Update List Source

== See also ==
- Subdivisions of Lesotho
- FIPS region codes of Lesotho
- Neighbouring country: ZA
