= ISO 3166-2:LB =

Entry for Lebanon in ISO 3166-2

ISO 3166-2:LB is the entry for Lebanon in ISO 3166-2, part of the ISO 3166 standard published by the International Organization for Standardization (ISO), which defines codes for the names of the principal subdivisions (e.g., provinces or states) of all countries coded in ISO 3166-1.

Currently for Lebanon, ISO 3166-2 codes are defined for eight governorates. Aakkâr Governorate (which contains the current Aakkâr District) and Baalbek-Hermel Governorate (which contains the current Baalbek District and Hermel District), which are listed, are in the process of being implemented after having been approved for creation in 2003.

Each code consists of two parts, separated by a hyphen. The first part is LB, the ISO 3166-1 alpha-2 code of Lebanon. The second part is two letters.

== Current codes ==
Subdivision names are listed as in the ISO 3166-2 standard published by the ISO 3166 Maintenance Agency (ISO 3166/MA).

Click on the button in the header to sort each column.

Code	Subdivision name (ar) (conventional names)	Subdivision name (ar) (BGN/PCGN 1956)	Subdivision name (ar) (Note: For reference only, Arabic name in Arabic script not included in the ISO 3166-2 standard.)	Subdivision name (en) (Note: For reference only, English name not included in the ISO 3166-2 standard.)
LB-AK	Aakkâr	‘Akkār	عكار	Akkar
LB-BH	Baalbek-Hermel	B‘alabak-Al Hirmil	بعلبك - الهرمل	Baalbek-Hermel
LB-BI	Béqaa	Al Biqā‘	البقاع	Beqaa
LB-BA	Beyrouth	Bayrūt	بيروت	Beirut
LB-AS	Liban-Nord	Ash Shimāl	محافظة الشمال	North Lebanon
LB-JA	Liban-Sud	Al Janūb	محافظة الجنوب	South Lebanon
LB-JL	Mont-Liban	Jabal Lubnān	جبل لبنان	Mount Lebanon
LB-NA	Nabatîyé	An Nabaţīyah	النبطية	Nabatieh

== Changes ==
The following changes to the entry have been announced in newsletters by the ISO 3166/MA since the first publication of ISO 3166-2 in 1998:

Newsletter	Date issued	Description of change in newsletter	Code/Subdivision change
Newsletter I-9	2007-11-28	Addition of administrative subdivisions and of their code elements	Subdivisions added: LB-AK Aakkâr; LB-BH Baalbek-Hermel

== See also ==
- Subdivisions of Lebanon
- FIPS region codes of Lebanon
- Neighbouring countries: IL, SY
