= ISO 3166-2:NZ =

Entry for New Zealand in ISO 3166-2

ISO 3166-2:NZ is the entry for New Zealand in ISO 3166-2, part of the ISO 3166 standard published by the International Organization for Standardization (ISO), which defines codes for the names of the principal subdivisions (e.g., provinces or states) of all countries coded in ISO 3166.

Currently for New Zealand, ISO 3166-2 codes are defined for 16 regions and one special island authority

Some New Zealand outlying islands that are outside the authority of any regions are not assigned codes, specifically:

- Kermadec Islands
- New Zealand Subantarctic Islands
- Three Kings Islands

Each code consists of two parts separated by a hyphen. The first part is NZ, the ISO 3166-1 alpha-2 code of New Zealand. The second part is three letters: regions and special island authority.

== Current codes ==
Subdivision names are listed as in the ISO 3166-2 standard published by the ISO 3166 Maintenance Agency (ISO 3166/MA).

ISO 639-1 codes are used to represent subdivision names in the following administrative languages:

- (en): English
- (mi): Māori

Click on the button in the header to sort each column.

Code	Subdivision name (en)	Subdivision name (mi)	Subdivision category
NZ-AUK	Auckland	Tāmaki-Makaurau	region
NZ-BOP	Bay of Plenty	Toi Moana	region
NZ-CAN	Canterbury	Waitaha	region
NZ-CIT	Chatham Islands Territory	Wharekauri	special island authority
NZ-GIS	Gisborne	Te Tairāwhiti	region
NZ-WGN	Greater Wellington	Te Pane Matua Taiao	region
NZ-HKB	Hawke's Bay	Te Matau-a-Māui	region
NZ-MWT	Manawatū-Whanganui	Manawatū Whanganui	region
NZ-MBH	Marlborough		region
NZ-NSN	Nelson	Whakatū	region
NZ-NTL	Northland	Te Tai tokerau	region
NZ-OTA	Otago	Ō Tākou	region
NZ-STL	Southland	Te Taiao Tonga	region
NZ-TKI	Taranaki	Taranaki	region
NZ-TAS	Tasman	Te tai o Aorere	region
NZ-WKO	Waikato	Waikato	region
NZ-WTC	West Coast	Te Tai o Poutini	region

The self-governing countries in free association with New Zealand (the Cook Islands and Niue) and the dependent territory of Tokelau have their own ISO 3166-1 codes and are not included in New Zealand's entry in ISO 3166-2.

== Changes ==
The following changes to the entry have been announced by the ISO 3166/MA since the first publication of ISO 3166-2 in 1998. ISO stopped issuing newsletters in 2013.

Newsletter	Date issued	Description of change in newsletter	Code/Subdivision change
Newsletter II-2	2010-06-30	Addition of the country code prefix as the first code element, addition of names in administrative languages, update of the administrative structure and of the list source	Subdivisions added: NZ-CIT Chatham Islands Territory
Online Browsing; Platform (OBP)	2014-11-03	Change subdivision category of NZ-AUK	(TBD)
Online Browsing; Platform (OBP)	2015-11-27	Deletion of all unitary authorities; deletion of islands NZ-N, NZ-S; Change of subdivision name of NZ-GIS, NZ-MBH, NZ-NSN, NZ-TAS, change of subdivision category from regional council to region; update List Source	(TBD)
Online Browsing; Platform (OBP)	2022-11-29	Change of subdivision name of NZ-AUK, NZ-BOP, NZ-STL, NZ-GIS, NZ-HKB, NZ-NTL, NZ-WTC in mri; Change of subdivision name of NZ-WGN, NZ-MWT in eng and mri; Addition of subdivision name for NZ-WKO in eng; Addition of subdivision name for NZ-TAS in mri; Update List Source	(TBD)
Online Browsing; Platform (OBP)	2023-11-23	Deletion of the space before the dash of NZ-AUK in mri	Subdivision changed: NZ-AUK

== See also ==
- Subdivisions of New Zealand
- FIPS region codes of New Zealand
