= ISO 3166-2:UZ =

Entry for Uzbekistan in ISO 3166-2

ISO 3166-2:UZ is the entry for Uzbekistan in ISO 3166-2, part of the ISO 3166 standard published by the International Organization for Standardization (ISO), which defines codes for the names of the principal subdivisions (e.g., provinces or states) of all countries coded in ISO 3166-1.

Currently for Uzbekistan, ISO 3166-2 codes are defined for one city, 12 regions and one republic. The city Tashkent is the capital of the country and has special status equal to the regions.

Each code consists of two parts separated by a hyphen. The first part is UZ, the ISO 3166-1 alpha-2 code of Uzbekistan. The second part is two letters.

== Current codes ==
Subdivision names are listed as in the ISO 3166-2 standard published by the ISO 3166 Maintenance Agency (ISO 3166/MA).

Click on the button in the header to sort each column.

Code	Subdivision name (uz)	Subdivision name (uz) (Note: For reference only, Uzbek name in Cyrillic script not included in the ISO 3166-2 standard.)	Subdivision name (en) (Note: For reference only, English name not included in the ISO 3166-2 standard.)	Subdivision category
UZ-AN	Andijon	Андижон	Andijan	region
UZ-BU	Buxoro	Buxoro	Bukhara	region
UZ-FA	Farg‘ona	Фарғона	Fergana	region
UZ-JI	Jizzax	Жиззах	Jizzakh	region
UZ-NG	Namangan	Наманган	Namangan	region
UZ-NW	Navoiy	Навоий	Navoiy	region
UZ-QA	Qashqadaryo	Қашқадарё	Qashqadaryo	region
UZ-QR	Qoraqalpog‘iston Respublikasi	Қорақалпоғистон	Karakalpakstan	republic
UZ-SA	Samarqand	Самарқанд	Samarqand	region
UZ-SI	Sirdaryo	Сирдарё	Sirdaryo	region
UZ-SU	Surxondaryo	Сурхондарё	Surkhondaryo	region
UZ-TK	Toshkent	Тошкент	Tashkent City	city
UZ-TO	Toshkent	Тошкент	Tashkent	region
UZ-XO	Xorazm	Xorazm	Khorezm	region

== Changes ==
The following changes to the entry have been announced in newsletters by the ISO 3166/MA since the first publication of ISO 3166-2 in 1998:

Newsletter	Date issued	Description of change in newsletter	Code/Subdivision change
Newsletter I-2	2002-05-21	Spelling corrections in accordance with the newly adopted Roman alphabet	Codes: UZ-KH Khorazm → UZ-XO Xorazm
Newsletter I-4	2002-12-10	Introduction of third subdivision category. Addition of one city. Subdivision categories in header re-sorted	Subdivisions added: UZ-TK Toshkent (city)

== See also ==
- Subdivisions of Uzbekistan
- FIPS region codes of Uzbekistan
- Neighbouring countries: AF, KG, KZ, TJ, TM
