= ISO 3166-2:PA =

Entry for Panama in ISO 3166-2

ISO 3166-2:PA is the entry for Panama in ISO 3166-2, part of the ISO 3166 standard published by the International Organization for Standardization (ISO), which defines codes for the names of the principal subdivisions (e.g., provinces or states) of all countries coded in ISO 3166-1.

Currently for Panama, ISO 3166-2 codes are defined for ten provinces and four indigenous regions.

Each code consists of two parts separated by a hyphen. The first part is PA, the ISO 3166-1 alpha-2 code of Panama. The second part is either of the following:

- one or two digits (1–10): provinces
- two letters: indigenous regions

== Current codes ==
Subdivision names are listed as in the ISO 3166-2 standard published by the ISO 3166 Maintenance Agency (ISO 3166/MA).

Click on the button in the header to sort each column.

| Code | Subdivision name (es) | Subdivision name (en) (Note: For reference only, English name not included in the ISO 3166-2 standard.) | Subdivision category |
|---|---|---|---|
| PA-1 | Bocas del Toro | Bocas del Toro | province |
| PA-4 | Chiriquí | Chiriqui | province |
| PA-2 | Coclé | Cocle | province |
| PA-3 | Colón | Colon | province |
| PA-5 | Darién | Darien | province |
| PA-EM | Emberá | Embera | indigenous region |
| PA-KY | Guna Yala (local variant: Kuna Yala) | Guna Yala | indigenous region |
| PA-6 | Herrera | Herrera | province |
| PA-7 | Los Santos | Los Santos | province |
| PA-NT | Naso Tjër Di | Naso Tjer Di | indigenous region |
| PA-NB | Ngäbe-Buglé | Ngabe-Bugle | indigenous region |
| PA-8 | Panamá | Panama | province |
| PA-10 | Panamá Oeste | West Panama | province |
| PA-9 | Veraguas | Veraguas | province |

== Changes ==
The following changes to the entry have been announced in newsletters by the ISO 3166/MA since the first publication of ISO 3166–2 in 1998. ISO stopped issuing newsletters in 2013.

| Newsletter | Date issued | Description of change in newsletter | Code/Subdivision change |
|---|---|---|---|
| Newsletter II-2 | 2010-06-30 | Update of the administrative structure and of the list source | Subdivisions added: PA-EM Emberá; PA-NB Ngöbe-Buglé; Codes: PA-0 Comarca de San Blas → PA-KY Kuna Yala |

The following changes to the entry are listed on ISO's online catalogue, the Online Browsing Platform:

| Effective date of change | Short description of change (en) |
|---|---|
| 2010-06-30 | Update of the administrative structure and of the list source |
| 2014-11-03 | Add 1 province PA-10; update List Source |
| 2017-11-23 | Change of subdivision name of PA-KY; addition of local variation of PA-KY, update List Source |
| 2021-11-25 | Addition of indigenous region PA-NT; Update List Source |
| 2022-11-29 | Change of spelling of subdivision name of PA-NB; Update List Source |

== See also ==
- Subdivisions of Panama
- FIPS region codes of Panama
- Neighbouring countries: CO, CR
