= ISO 3166-2:KR =

Entry for South Korea in ISO 3166-2

ISO 3166-2:KR is the entry for South Korea (officially the Republic of Korea) in ISO 3166-2, part of the ISO 3166 standard published by the International Organization for Standardization (ISO), which defines codes for the names of the principal subdivisions (e.g., provinces or states) of all countries coded in ISO 3166-1.

Currently for South Korea, ISO 3166-2 codes are defined for one special city, six metropolitan cities, seven provinces, two special self-governing provinces and one special self-governing city. All of them are province-level subdivisions.

Each code consists of two parts separated by a hyphen. The first part is KR, the ISO 3166-1 alpha-2 code of South Korea. The second part is two digits:

- 11: special city
- 26–31: metropolitan cities
- 41, 43–48: provinces
- 42, 49: special self-governing provinces
- 50: special self-governing city

== Current codes ==
Subdivision names are listed as in the ISO 3166-2 standard published by the ISO 3166 Maintenance Agency (ISO 3166/MA). Since the codes are last updated in 2023, It did not reflect Jeonbuk's special self-governing province status and the merger of Jeonnam–Gwangju yet.

Click on the button in the header to sort each column.

Code	Subdivision (ko) (National 2000)		Subdivision (ko) (Note: For reference only, Korean name in Korean script not included in the ISO 3166-2 standard.)		Subdivision name (en) (Note: For reference only, English name not included in the ISO 3166-2 standard.)	Subdivision category
Code	Name	Local variant	Name	Local variant	Subdivision name (en)	Subdivision category
KR-26	Busan-gwangyeoksi	Busan	부산광역시	부산	Busan	metropolitan city
KR-43	Chungcheongbuk-do	Chungbuk	충청북도	충북	North Chungcheong	province
KR-44	Chungcheongnam-do	Chungnam	충청남도	충남	South Chungcheong	province
KR-27	Daegu-gwangyeoksi	Daegu	대구광역시	대구	Daegu	metropolitan city
KR-30	Daejeon-gwangyeoksi	Daejeon	대전광역시	대전	Daejeon	metropolitan city
KR-42	Gangwon-teukbyeoljachido	Gangwon	강원특별자치도	강원	Gangwon	special self-governing province
KR-29	Gwangju-gwangyeoksi	Gwangju	광주광역시	광주	Gwangju	metropolitan city
KR-41	Gyeonggi-do	Gyeonggi	경기도	경기	Gyeonggi	province
KR-47	Gyeongsangbuk-do	Gyeongbuk	경상북도	경북	North Gyeongsang	province
KR-48	Gyeongsangnam-do	Gyeongnam	경상남도	경남	South Gyeongsang	province
KR-28	Incheon-gwangyeoksi	Incheon	인천광역시	인천	Incheon	metropolitan city
KR-49	Jeju-teukbyeoljachido	Jeju	제주특별자치도	제주	Jeju	special self-governing province
KR-45	Jeollabuk-do	Jeonbuk	전라북도	전북	North Jeolla	province
KR-46	Jeollanam-do	Jeonnam	전라남도	전남	South Jeolla	province
KR-50	Sejong		세종		Sejong	special self-governing city
KR-11	Seoul-teukbyeolsi	Seoul	서울특별시	서울	Seoul	special city
KR-31	Ulsan-gwangyeoksi	Ulsan	울산광역시	울산	Ulsan	metropolitan city

== Changes ==
The following changes to the entry have been announced in newsletters by the ISO 3166/MA since the first publication of ISO 3166-2 in 1998:

Newsletter	Date issued	Description of change in newsletter
Newsletter I-1	2000-06-21	Correction of 1 spelling mistake. Update of the source information

The following changes to the entry are listed on ISO's online catalogue, the Online Browsing Platform:

Effective date of change	Short description of change (en)
2023-11-23	Change of category name from province to special self-governing province for KR-42; Update List Source

== See also ==
- Subdivisions of South Korea
- FIPS region codes of South Korea
- Neighbouring country: KP
