= ISO 3166-2:TL =

Entry for Timor-Leste (East Timor) in ISO 3166-2

ISO 3166-2:TL is the entry for Timor-Leste (East Timor) in ISO 3166-2, part of the ISO 3166 standard published by the International Organization for Standardization (ISO), which defines codes for the names of the principal subdivisions (e.g., provinces or states) of all countries coded in ISO 3166-1.

Currently for Timor-Leste, ISO 3166-2 codes are defined for 12 municipalities and one special administrative region.

Each code consists of two parts separated by a hyphen. The first part is TL, the ISO 3166-1 alpha-2 code of Timor-Leste. The second part is two letters.

Before it became independent from Indonesia in 2002, Timor-Leste was officially assigned the ISO 3166-1 alpha-2 code TP. Moreover, it was also assigned the ISO 3166-2 code ID-TT under the entry for Indonesia.

== Current codes ==
Subdivision names are listed as in the ISO 3166-2 standard published by the ISO 3166 Maintenance Agency (ISO 3166/MA).

ISO 639-1 and ISO 639-2 codes are used to represent subdivision names in the following administrative languages:

- (pt): Portuguese
- (tet): Tetum

Code	Subdivision name (pt)	Subdivision name (tet)	Category
TL-AL	Aileu	Aileu	municipality
TL-AN	Ainaro	Ainaru	municipality
TL-BA	Baucau	Baukau	municipality
TL-BO	Bobonaro	Bobonaru	municipality
TL-CO	Cova Lima	Kovalima	municipality
TL-DI	Díli	Díli	municipality
TL-ER	Ermera	Ermera	municipality
TL-LA	Lautém	Lautein	municipality
TL-LI	Liquiça	Likisá	municipality
TL-MT	Manatuto	Manatutu	municipality
TL-MF	Manufahi	Manufahi	municipality
TL-OE	Oé-Cusse Ambeno (local variant is Oecussi)	Oekusi-Ambenu	special administrative region
TL-VI	Viqueque	Vikeke	municipality

== Changes ==
The following changes to the entry have been announced by the ISO 3166/MA since the first publication of ISO 3166-2 in 1998. ISO stopped issuing newsletters in 2013.

Newsletter	Date issued	Description of change in newsletter	Code/Subdivision change
Newsletter I-3	2002-08-20	Change of the ISO 3166-1 alpha-2 code element to TL. Insertion of 13 districts. In accordance with ISO 3166-1 Newsletter V-5	Subdivisions added: 13 districts
Newsletter I-4	2002-12-10	Change of country name in accordance with ISO 3166-1 Newsletter V-6 (East Timor renamed Timor-Leste in English and French). Spelling correction in TL-LI	(TBD)
Newsletter II-3	2011-12-13 (corrected 2011-12-15)	Update of the language adjustment and source list update.	Spelling change TL-DI Dili → Díli
Online Browsing; Platform (OBP)	2018-11-26	Change of subdivision category name from district to municipality; Addition of category name in tet; Change of category name from district to special administrative region for TL-OE; Change of spelling in por of TL-OE; Change of spelling of TL-LA; Addition of local variation of TL-OE; Update List Source	(TBD)

== See also ==
- Subdivisions of Timor-Leste
- Neighbouring country: ID
