= ISO 3166-2:SZ =

Entry for Eswatini in ISO 3166-2

ISO 3166-2:SZ is the entry for Eswatini in ISO 3166-2, part of the ISO 3166 standard published by the International Organization for Standardization (ISO), which defines codes for the names of the principal subdivisions (e.g., provinces or states) of all countries coded in ISO 3166-1.

Currently for Eswatini, ISO 3166-2 codes are defined for the four regions of Eswatini.

Each code consists of two parts, separated by a hyphen. The first part is SZ, the ISO 3166-1 alpha-2 code of Eswatini. The second part is two letters.

== Current codes ==
Subdivision names are listed as in the ISO 3166-2 standard published by the ISO 3166 Maintenance Agency (ISO 3166/MA).

Regions of Eswatini

Click on the button in the header to sort each column.

Code	Subdivision name (ss, en)
SZ-HH	Hhohho
SZ-LU	Lubombo
SZ-MA	Manzini
SZ-SH	Shiselweni

== Changes ==
The following changes to the entry are listed on ISO's online catalogue, the Online Browsing Platform:

Effective date of change	Short description of change (en)
2018-07-16	Change of the short name, full name and local short name in eng
2018-11-26	Change of subdivision category from district to region; Update List Source

== See also ==
- Subdivisions of Eswatini
- FIPS region codes of Eswatini
- Neighbouring countries: MZ, ZA
