= ISO 3166-2:AE =

Entry for the United Arab Emirates in ISO 3166-2

ISO 3166-2:AE is the entry for the United Arab Emirates in ISO 3166-2, part of the ISO 3166 standard published by the International Organization for Standardization (ISO), which defines codes for the names of the principal subdivisions (e.g., provinces or states) of all countries coded in ISO 3166-1.

Currently for the United Arab Emirates, ISO 3166-2 codes are defined for seven emirates.

Each code consists of two parts, separated by a hyphen. The first part is AE, the ISO 3166-1 alpha-2 code of the United Arab Emirates. The second part is two letters.

== Current codes ==
Subdivision names are listed as in the ISO 3166-2 standard published by the ISO 3166 Maintenance Agency (ISO 3166/MA).

Click on the button in the header to sort each column.

Code	Subdivision Name (ar) (BGN/PCGN 1956)	Local variant	Subdivision name (ar) (Note: For reference only, Arabic name in Arabic script not included in the ISO 3166-2 standard.)
AE-AJ	‘Ajmān		عجمانّ
AE-AZ	Abū Z̧aby	Abu Dhabi	أبو ظبي
AE-FU	Al Fujayrah	Fujairah	الفجيرة
AE-SH	Ash Shāriqah	Sharjah	الشارقةّ
AE-DU	Dubayy	Dubai	دبي
AE-RK	Ra’s al Khaymah	Ras Al Khaimah	رأس الخيمة
AE-UQ	Umm al Qaywayn	Umm Al Quwain	أمّ القيوين

== Changes ==
The following changes to the entry have been announced by the ISO 3166/MA since the first publication of ISO 3166-2 in 1998. ISO stopped issuing newsletters in 2013.

Newsletter	Date issued	Description of change in newsletter
Newsletter I-2	2002-05-21	Spelling correction in AE-RK
Newsletter I-3	2002-08-20	Error correction: Spelling correction in AE-AZ
Online Browsing Platform (OBP)	2015-11-27	Change of spelling of AE-AJ, AE-RK; addition of local variation of AE-FU, AE-RK, AE-UQ; update List Source

== See also ==
- Subdivisions of the United Arab Emirates
- FIPS region codes of the United Arab Emirates
- Neighbouring countries: OM, SA
