= ISO 3166-2:ZA =

Entry for South Africa in ISO 3166-2

ISO 3166-2:ZA is the entry for South Africa in ISO 3166-2, part of the ISO 3166 standard published by the International Organization for Standardization (ISO), which defines codes for the names of the principal subdivisions (e.g., provinces or states) of all countries coded in ISO 3166-1.

ZA hails from Dutch: Zuid-Afrika. Currently for South Africa, ISO 3166-2 codes are defined for nine provinces.

Each code consists of two parts separated by a hyphen. The first part is ZA, the ISO 3166-1 alpha-2 code of South Africa. The second part consists of two or three letters indicating the province.

== Current codes ==
Subdivision names are listed as in the ISO 3166-2 standard published by the ISO 3166 Maintenance Agency (ISO 3166/MA).

ISO 639 codes are used to represent subdivision names in the following administrative languages:

- (en): English
- (af): Afrikaans
- (nr): Ndebele
- (nso): Pedi
- (st): Sotho
- (ss): Swati
- (ts): Tsonga
- (tn): Tswana
- (ve): Venda
- (xh): Xhosa
- (zu): Zulu

Click on the button in the header to sort each column.

Code	Subdivision name (en)	Language code	Subdivision name	Local variant
ZA-EC	Eastern Cape	(af) (nr) (nso) (st) (ss) (ts) (tn) (ve) (xh) (zu)	Oos-Kaap iPumalanga-Kapa; Kapa Bohlabela; Kapa Botjhabela Kapa-Vuxa; Kapa Botlhaba; Kapa Vhubvaḓuvha; Mpuma-Koloni; Mpumalanga-Kapa	Mpumalanga-Koloni
ZA-FS	Free State	(af) (nr) (nso) (st) (ss) (ts) (tn) (ve) (xh) (zu)	Vrystaat iFreyistata; Freistata; Freistata Free State; Foreisetata; Fureisitata; Freyistata; Fuleyisitata	Foreisetata Freyisitata
ZA-GP	Gauteng	(af) (nr) (nso) (st) (ss) (ts) (tn) (ve) (xh) (zu)	Gauteng iGauteng; Gauteng; Kgauteng; Gauteng; Gauteng; Gauteng; Gauteng; Rhawuti; Gauteng	
ZA-KZN	Kwazulu-Natal	(af) (nr) (nso) (st) (ss) (ts) (tn) (ve) (xh) (zu)	KwaZulu-Natal iKwaZulu-Natal; GaZulu-Natala; Hazolo-Natala; KwaZulu-Natali; Kwazulu-Natal; KwaZulu-Natal; HaZulu-Natal; KwaZulu-Natala; KwaZulu-Natali	
ZA-LP	Limpopo	(af) (nr) (nso) (st) (ss) (ts) (tn) (ve) (xh) (zu)	Limpopo; Limpopo; Limpopo; Limpopo; Limpopo; Limpopo; Limpopo; Vhembe; Limpopo; Limpopo	
ZA-MP	Mpumalanga	(af) (nr) (nso) (st) (ss) (ts) (tn) (ve) (xh) (zu)	Mpumalanga iMpumalanga; Mpumalanga; Mpumalanga; Mpumalanga; Mpumalanga; Mpumalanga; Mpumalanga; Mpumalanga; Mpumalanga	
ZA-NW	North-West	(af) (nr) (nso) (st) (ss) (ts) (tn) (ve) (xh) (zu)	Noordwes iTlhagwini-Tjhingalanga; Lebowa Bodikela; Leboya (le) Bophirima N'walungu-Vupeladyambu; Bokone Bophirima Mntla-Ntshona; Nyakatho-Ntshonalanga	
ZA-NC	Northern Cape	(af) (nr) (nso) (st) (ss) (ts) (tn) (ve) (xh) (zu)	Noord-Kaap iTlhagwini-Kapa; Kapa Leboya; Kapa Leboya Kapa-N'walungu; Kapa Bokone; Kapa Devhula; Mntla-Koloni; Nyakatho-Kapa	Kapa Leboa Nyakatho-Koloni
ZA-WC	Western Cape	(af) (nr) (nso) (st) (ss) (ts) (tn) (ve) (xh) (zu)	Wes-Kaap iTjhingalanga-Kapa; Kapa Bodikela; Kapa Bophirimela Kapa-Vupeladyambu; Kapa Bophirima; Kapa Vhukovhela; Ntshona-Koloni; Ntshonalanga-Kapa	Ntshonalanga-Koloni

== Changes ==
The following changes to the entry have been announced by the ISO 3166/MA since the first publication of ISO 3166-2 in 1998:

Edition/Newsletter	Date issued	Description of change	Code/Subdivision change
Newsletter I-6	2004-03-08	Change of name of Northern Province to Limpopo	Subdivision: ZA-NP Northern Province → ZA-LP Limpopo
Newsletter I-9	2007-11-28	Addition of administrative divisions and their codes	Codes: (not marked with red colour in newsletter); Gauteng: ZA-GT → ZA-GP; KwaZulu-Natal: ZA-NL → ZA-ZN
ISO 3166-2:2007	2007-12-13	Second edition of ISO 3166-2 (not announced in a newsletter)	Codes: Gauteng: ZA-GP → ZA-GT; KwaZulu-Natal: ZA-ZN → ZA-NL

The following changes to the entry are listed on ISO's online catalogue, the Online Browsing Platform:

Effective date of change	Description of change	Code/Subdivision change
2020-03-02	Change of subdivision code from ZA-GT to ZA-GP, ZA-NL to ZA-KZN; Update Code Source	Codes: ZA-GT → ZA-GP; ZA-NL → ZA-KZN

== See also ==
- Subdivisions of South Africa
- FIPS region codes of South Africa
- Neighbouring countries: BW, LS, MZ, NA, SZ, ZW
