= ISO 3166-2:AD =

Entry for Andorra in ISO 3166-2

ISO 3166-2:AD is the entry for Andorra in ISO 3166-2, part of the ISO 3166 standard published by the International Organization for Standardization (ISO), which defines codes for the names of the principal subdivisions (e.g., provinces or states) of all countries coded in ISO 3166-1.

Currently for Andorra, ISO 3166-2 codes are defined for seven parishes.

Each code consists of two parts, separated by a hyphen. The first part is AD, the ISO 3166-1 alpha-2 code of Andorra. The second part is two digits:

- 02–07: parishes created before 1978
- 08: Escaldes-Engordany (Escaldes-Engordany split from Andorra la Vella in 1978)

== Current codes ==
Subdivision names are listed as in the ISO 3166-2 standard published by the ISO 3166 Maintenance Agency (ISO 3166/MA).

Click on the button in the header to sort each column.

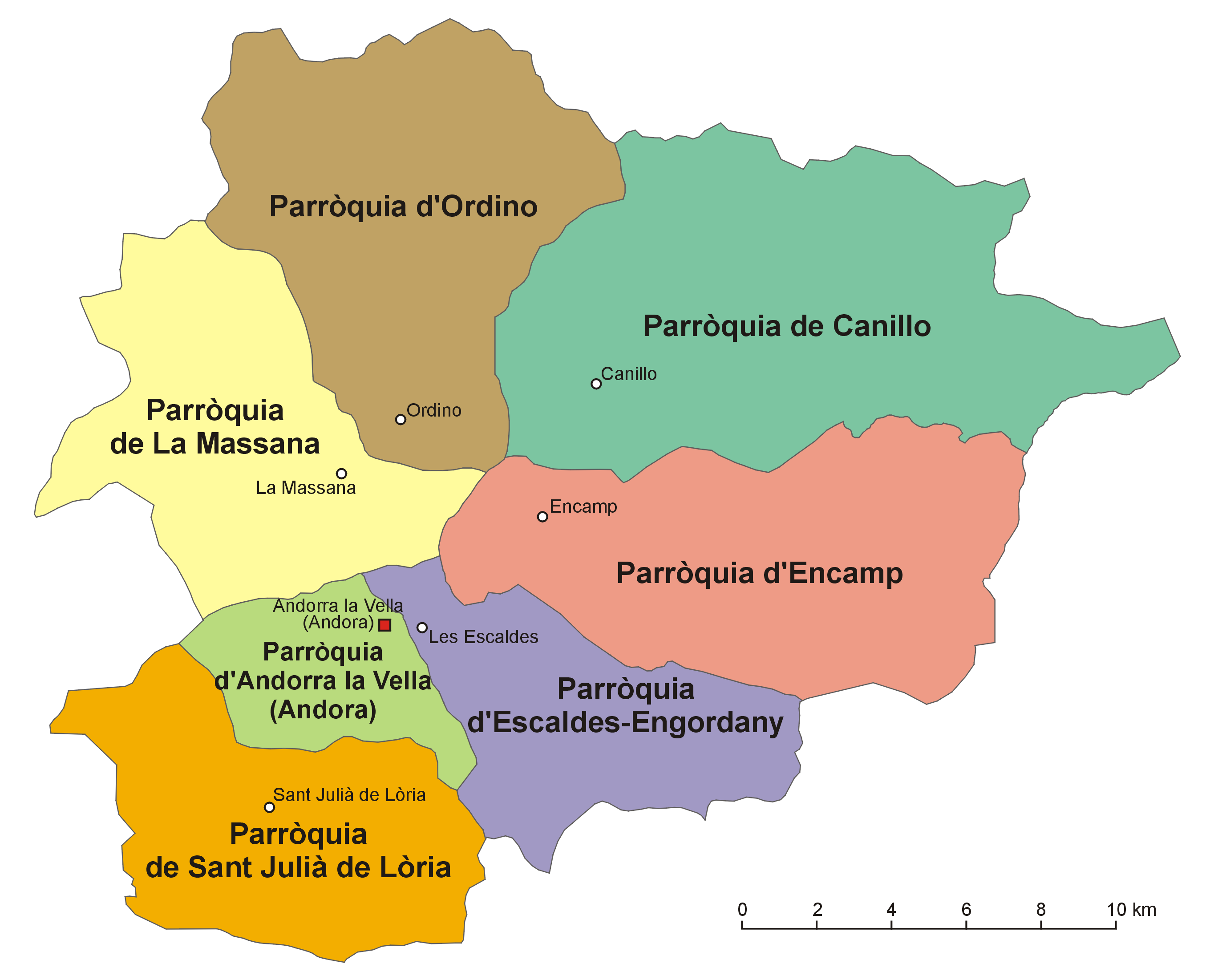
Parròquies (parishes) of Andorra

Code	Subdivision name (ca)	Seal
AD-07	Andorra la Vella	
AD-02	Canillo	
AD-03	Encamp	
AD-08	Escaldes-Engordany	
AD-04	La Massana	
AD-05	Ordino	
AD-06	Sant Julià de Lòria	

== Changes ==
The following changes to the entry have been announced by the ISO 3166/MA since the first publication of ISO 3166-2 in 1998. ISO stopped issuing newsletters in 2013.

Newsletter	Date issued	Description of change in newsletter	Code/Subdivision change
Newsletter I-8	2007-04-17	Addition of the administrative subdivisions and of their code elements	Subdivisions added: 7 parishes
Online Browsing Platform (OBP)	2014-11-03	Update List Source	
Online Browsing Platform (OBP)	2015-11-27	Update List Source	

== See also ==
- Subdivisions of Andorra
- FIPS region codes of Andorra
- Neighbouring countries: ES, FR
