= ISO 3166-2:BN =

Entry for Brunei in ISO 3166-2

ISO 3166-2:BN is the entry for Brunei in ISO 3166-2, part of the ISO 3166 standard published by the International Organization for Standardization (ISO), which defines codes for the names of the principal subdivisions (e.g., provinces or states) of all countries coded in ISO 3166-1.

Currently for Brunei, ISO 3166-2 codes are defined for four districts.

Each code consists of two parts, separated by a hyphen. The first part is BN, the ISO 3166-1 alpha-2 code of Brunei. The second part is two letters.

== Current codes ==
Subdivision names are listed as in the ISO 3166-2 standard published by the ISO 3166 Maintenance Agency (ISO 3166/MA).

Click on the button in the header to sort each column.

Code	Subdivision name (en)	Subdivision name (ms)
BN-BE	Belait	Belait
BN-BM	Brunei-Muara	Brunei dan Muara
BN-TE	Temburong	Temburong
BN-TU	Tutong	Tutong

== Changes ==
The following changes to the entry are listed on ISO's online catalogue, the Online Browsing Platform:

Effective date of change	Short description of change (en)	Code/Subdivision change
2019-11-22	Change of subdivision name of BN-BM; Update List Source	Spelling change: BN-BM Brunei-Muara → Brunei dan Muara (ms)

== See also ==
- Subdivisions of Brunei
- FIPS region codes of Brunei
- Neighbouring country: MY
