= ISO 3166-2:IL =

Entry for Israel in ISO 3166-2

ISO 3166-2:IL is the entry for Israel in ISO 3166-2, part of the ISO 3166 standard published by the International Organization for Standardization (ISO), which defines codes for the names of the principal subdivisions (e.g., provinces or states) of all countries coded in ISO 3166-1.

Currently for Israel, ISO 3166-2 codes are defined for six districts.

Each code consists of two parts, separated by a hyphen. The first part is IL, the ISO 3166-1 alpha-2 code of Israel. The second part is one or two letters. The code for Yerushalayim (IL-JM) is assigned based on its English name, Jerusalem.

== Current codes ==
Subdivision names are listed as in the ISO 3166-2 standard published by the ISO 3166 Maintenance Agency (ISO 3166/MA).

ISO 639-1 codes are used to represent subdivision names in the following administrative languages:

- (he): Hebrew
- (ar): Arabic

Click on the button in the header to sort each column.

Code	Subdivision (he) (National 2006 = UN IX/9 2007)		Subdivision (ar) (BGN/PCGN 1956)		Subdivision name (he) (Note: For reference only, Hebrew name in Hebrew script not included in the ISO 3166-2 standard.)	Subdivision name (ar) (Note: For reference only, Arabic name in Arabic script not included in the ISO 3166-2 standard.)
Code	Name	Local variant	Name	Local variant	Subdivision name (he)	Subdivision name (ar)
IL-D	HaDarom	Southern	Al Janūbī	El Janūbī	הדרום	الجنوبي
IL-M	HaMerkaz	Central	Al Awsaţ	El Awsaṭ	המרכז	الأوسط
IL-Z	HaTsafon	Northern	Ash Shamālī	Esh Shamālī	הצפון	الشمالي
IL-HA	H̱efa	Haifa	Ḩayfā	Ḥeifa	חיפה	حيفا
IL-TA	Tel Aviv		Tall Abīb	Tell Abīb	תל אביב	تل أبيب
IL-JM	Yerushalayim	Jerusalem	Al Quds	El Quds	ירושלים	القدس

== See also ==
- Subdivisions of Israel
- FIPS region codes of Israel
- Neighbouring countries: EG, JO, LB, PS, SY
