= ISO 3166-2:LC =

Entry for Saint Lucia in ISO 3166-2

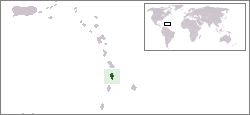

ISO 3166-2:LC is the entry for Saint Lucia in ISO 3166-2, part of the ISO 3166 standard published by the International Organization for Standardization (ISO), which defines codes for the names of the principal subdivisions (e.g., provinces or states) of all countries coded in ISO 3166-1.

Currently for Saint Lucia, ISO 3166-2 codes are defined for ten districts.

Each code consists of two parts separated by a hyphen. The first part is LC, the ISO 3166-1 alpha-2 code of Saint Lucia. The second part is two digits (01–12) except 04 and 09.

== Current codes ==
Subdivision names are listed as in the ISO 3166-2 standard published by the ISO 3166 Maintenance Agency (ISO 3166/MA).

Click on the button in the header to sort each column.

Code	Subdivision name (en)
LC-01	Anse la Raye
LC-12	Canaries
LC-02	Castries
LC-03	Choiseul
LC-05	Dennery
LC-06	Gros Islet
LC-07	Laborie
LC-08	Micoud
LC-10	Soufrière
LC-11	Vieux Fort

== Changes ==
The following changes to the entry have been announced in newsletters by the ISO 3166/MA since the first publication of ISO 3166-2 in 1998. ISO stopped issuing newsletters in 2013.

Edition/Newsletter	Date issued	Description of change in newsletter	Code/Subdivision change
ISO 3166-2:2007	2007-12-13	Second edition of ISO 3166-2 (this change was not announced in a newsletter)	Subdivisions added: 11 quarters

The following changes to the entry are listed on ISO's online catalogue, the Online Browsing Platform:

Effective date of change	Short description of change (en)
2015-11-27	Update List Source
2014-10-31	Change subdivision category to district; add 1 district LC-12; delete 2 districts LC-04 and LC-09; update List Source

== See also ==
- Subdivisions of Saint Lucia
- FIPS region codes of Saint Lucia
