= ISO 3166-2:JO =

Entry for Jordan in ISO 3166-2

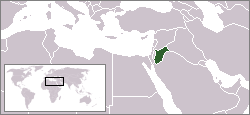
Jordan in the Middle East

ISO 3166-2:JO is the entry for Jordan in ISO 3166-2, part of the ISO 3166 standard published by the International Organization for Standardization (ISO), which defines codes for the names of the principal subdivisions (e.g., provinces or states) of all countries coded in ISO 3166-1.

Currently for Jordan, ISO 3166-2 codes are defined for 12 governorates.

Each code consists of two parts, separated by a hyphen. The first part is JO, the ISO 3166-1 alpha-2 code of Jordan. The second part is two letters.

== Current codes ==
Subdivision names are listed as in the ISO 3166-2 standard published by the ISO 3166 Maintenance Agency (ISO 3166/MA).

Click on the button in the header to sort each column.

Code	Subdivision name (ar) (BGN/PCGN 1956)	Local variant	Subdivision name (ar)	Subdivision name (en)
JO-AJ	‘Ajlūn		عجلون	Ajloun
JO-AQ	Al ‘Aqabah	Aqaba	العقبة	Aqaba
JO-AM	Al ‘A̅şimah	‘Ammān	العاصمة	Amman
JO-BA	Al Balqā’		البلقاء	Balqa
JO-KA	Al Karak		الكرك	Karak
JO-MA	Al Mafraq		المفرق	Mafraq
JO-AT	Aţ Ţafīlah		الطفيلة	Tafilah
JO-AZ	Az Zarqā’		الزرقاء	Zarqa
JO-IR	Irbid		إربد	Irbid
JO-JA	Jarash		جرش	Jerash
JO-MN	Ma‘ān		معان	Ma'an
JO-MD	Mādabā		مادبا	Madaba

== Changes ==
The following changes to the entry have been announced in newsletters by the ISO 3166/MA since the first publication of ISO 3166-2 in 1998:

Newsletter	Date issued	Description of change in newsletter
Newsletter II-3	2011-12-13 (corrected 2011-12-15)	Alphabetical re-ordering, administrative names precision and evolution and source list update.

== See also ==
- FIPS region codes of Jordan
- Neighbouring countries: IL, IQ, PS, SA, SY
