= ISO 3166-2:TT =

Entry for Trinidad and Tobago in ISO 3166-2

ISO 3166-2:TT is the entry for Trinidad and Tobago in ISO 3166-2, part of the ISO 3166 standard published by the International Organization for Standardization (ISO), which defines codes for the names of the principal subdivisions (e.g., provinces or states) of all countries coded in ISO 3166-1.

Currently for Trinidad and Tobago, ISO 3166-2 codes are defined for nine regions, three boroughs, two cities and one ward.

Each code consists of two parts separated by a hyphen. The first part is TT, the ISO 3166-1 alpha-2 code of Trinidad and Tobago. The second part is three letters.

== Current codes ==
Subdivision names are listed as in the ISO 3166-2 standard published by the ISO 3166 Maintenance Agency (ISO 3166/MA).

Click on the button in the header to sort each column.

Code	Subdivision name (en)	Subdivision category
TT-ARI	Arima	borough
TT-CHA	Chaguanas	borough
TT-CTT	Couva-Tabaquite-Talparo	region
TT-DMN	Diego Martin	region
TT-MRC	Mayaro-Rio Claro	region
TT-PED	Penal-Debe	region
TT-POS	Port of Spain	city
TT-PRT	Princes Town	region
TT-PTF	Point Fortin	borough
TT-SFO	San Fernando	city
TT-SGE	Sangre Grande	region
TT-SIP	Siparia	region
TT-SJL	San Juan-Laventille	region
TT-TOB	Tobago	ward
TT-TUP	Tunapuna-Piarco	region

== Changes ==
The following changes to the entry are listed on ISO's online catalogue, the Online Browsing Platform:

Effective date of change	Short description of change (en)
2020-11-24	Change of category name from municipality to borough for TT-ARI, TT-CHA, TT-PTF; Change of subdivision category name from municipality to city for TT-POS, TT-SFO; Update List Source
2015-11-27	Deletion of regions TT-ETO, TT-RCM, TT-WTO; addition of region TT-MRC; addition of one ward TT-TOB; update List Source

== See also ==
- Subdivisions of Trinidad and Tobago
- FIPS region codes of Trinidad and Tobago
