= ISO 3166-2:SY =

Entry for Syria in ISO 3166-2

ISO 3166-2:SY is the entry for Syria in ISO 3166-2, part of the ISO 3166 standard published by the International Organization for Standardization (ISO), which defines codes for the names of the principal subdivisions (e.g., provinces or states) of all countries coded in ISO 3166-1.

Currently for Syria, ISO 3166-2 codes are defined for 14 provinces.

Each code consists of two parts, separated by a hyphen. The first part is SY, the ISO 3166-1 alpha-2 code of Syria. The second part is two letters.

== Current codes ==
Subdivision names are listed as in the ISO 3166-2 standard published by the ISO 3166 Maintenance Agency (ISO 3166/MA).

Click on the button in the header to sort each column.

Code	Subdivision name (ar) (BGN/PCGN 1956)	Subdivision name (ar) (Note: For reference only, Arabic name in Arabic script not included in the ISO 3166-2 standard.)	Subdivision name (en) (Note: For reference only, English name not included in the ISO 3166-2 standard.)
SY-HA	Al Ḩasakah	الحسكة	Hasaka
SY-LA	Al Lādhiqīyah	اللاذقية	Latakia
SY-QU	Al Qunayţirah	القنيطرة	Quneitra
SY-RA	Ar Raqqah	الرقة	Raqqa
SY-SU	As Suwaydā'	السويداء	Suwayda
SY-DR	Dar'ā	درعا	Daraa
SY-DY	Dayr az Zawr	دير الزور	Deir Ezzor
SY-DI	Dimashq	دمشق	Damascus
SY-HL	Ḩalab	حلب	Aleppo
SY-HM	Ḩamāh	حماة	Hama
SY-HI	Ḩimş	حمص	Homs
SY-ID	Idlib	ادلب	Idlib
SY-RD	Rīf Dimashq	ريف دمشق	Damascus Countryside
SY-TA	Ţarţūs	طرطوس	Tartus

== See also ==
- FIPS region codes of Syria
- Subdivisions of Syria
- Neighbouring countries: IL, IQ, JO, LB, TR
