= ISO 3166-2:DE =

Entry for Germany in ISO 3166-2

ISO 3166-2:DE is the entry for Germany in ISO 3166-2, part of the ISO 3166 standard published by the International Organization for Standardization (ISO), which defines codes for the names of the principal subdivisions (e.g., provinces or states) of all countries coded in ISO 3166-1.

The current version of the standard defines codes for all 16 German states, referring to them using the German words Land (singular) and Länder (plural). Each code consists of two parts, separated by a hyphen. The first part is DE, the ISO 3166-1 alpha-2 code for Germany; the second part is two letters derived from the name of the Land.

== Current codes ==
Subdivision names are listed as shown in the ISO 3166-2 standard, published by the ISO 3166 Maintenance Agency.

Map of Germany with each Land labelled with the second part of its ISO 3166-2 code

Code	Subdivision Name (de)	Subdivision Name (en) (Note: For reference only; translations into languages other than German are not included in the ISO 3166-2:DE standard.)
DE-BW	Baden-Württemberg	Baden-Württemberg
DE-BY	Bayern	Bavaria
DE-BE	Berlin	Berlin
DE-BB	Brandenburg	Brandenburg
DE-HB	Bremen	Bremen
DE-HH	Hamburg	Hamburg
DE-HE	Hessen	Hesse
DE-MV	Mecklenburg-Vorpommern	Mecklenburg-Western Pomerania
DE-NI	Niedersachsen	Lower Saxony
DE-NW	Nordrhein-Westfalen	North Rhine-Westphalia
DE-RP	Rheinland-Pfalz	Rhineland-Palatinate
DE-SL	Saarland	Saarland
DE-SN	Sachsen	Saxony
DE-ST	Sachsen-Anhalt	Saxony-Anhalt
DE-SH	Schleswig-Holstein	Schleswig-Holstein
DE-TH	Thüringen	Thuringia

Notes

The codes for Bremen (DE-HB) and Hamburg (DE-HH) are derived from the formal names of the cities—Freie Hansestadt Bremen and Freie und Hansestadt Hamburg, respectively—which reference their history in the Hanseatic League.

The codes for Lower Saxony (Niedersachsen, DE-NI), Saxony (Sachsen, DE-SN), and Saxony-Anhalt (Sachsen-Anhalt, DE-ST) were deliberately chosen (second or last letter of German state name as second letter in the code) because they avoid the connotations of Nazism associated with codes like NS ("Nationalsozialismus"), SA ("Sturmabteilung"), and SS ("Schutzstaffel"). The code for Hamburg could also be avoided on these grounds – it can be associated with the phrase Heil Hitler – but it is accepted as it was already in use for the city's vehicle registration plates long before Hitler's time in power.

== See also ==
- Administrative divisions of Germany
- FIPS region codes of Germany
- NUTS codes of Germany
- Neighbouring countries: AT, BE, CH, CZ, DK, FR, LU, NL, PL
