= ISO 3166-2:KM =

Entry for Comoros in ISO 3166-2

ISO 3166-2:KM is the entry for the Comoros in ISO 3166-2, part of the ISO 3166 standard published by the International Organization for Standardization (ISO), which defines codes for the names of the principal subdivisions (e.g., provinces or states) of all countries coded in ISO 3166-1.

Currently for the Comoros, ISO 3166-2 codes are defined for three islands.

Each code consists of two parts separated by a hyphen. The first part is KM, the ISO 3166-1 alpha-2 code of the Comoros. The second part is a letter.

== Current codes ==
Subdivision names are listed as in the ISO 3166-2 standard published by the ISO 3166 Maintenance Agency (ISO 3166/MA).

ISO 639-1 codes are used to represent subdivision names in the following administrative languages. The Shikomor language does not have a single ISO 639 code.

- (ar): Arabic using two romanization systems
- (fr): French
- (—): Shikomor

Click on the button in the header to sort each column.

Code	Subdivision name (fr)	Subdivision name (ar)		Subdivision name (—)
Code	Subdivision name (fr)	(conventional names)	(BGN/PCGN 1956)	Subdivision name (—)
KM-G	Grande Comore	Andjazîdja	Anjazījah	Ngazidja
KM-A	Anjouan	Andjouân	Anjwān	Ndzuwani
KM-M	Mohéli	Moûhîlî	Mūhīlī	Mwali

== Changes ==
The following changes to the entry have been announced in newsletters by the ISO 3166/MA since the first publication of ISO 3166-2 in 1998. ISO stopped issuing newsletters in 2013.

Newsletter	Date issued	Description of change in newsletter
Newsletter II-2	2010-06-30	Consistency between ISO 3166-1 and ISO 3166-2, addition of names in administrative languages, and update of the administrative structure and of the list source

The following changes to the entry are listed on ISO's online catalogue, the Online Browsing Platform:

Effective date of change	Short description of change (en)
2014-12-18	Alignment of the English short name lower case with UNTERM
2010-06-30	Consistency between ISO 3166-1 and ISO 3166-2, addition of names in administrative languages, and update of the administrative structure and of the list source
2009-01-07	Addition of administrative language Shikomor (-,-)

== See also ==
- Subdivisions of the Comoros
- FIPS region codes of the Comoros
