= ISO 3166-2:NP =

Entry for Nepal in ISO 3166-2

ISO 3166-2:NP is the entry for Nepal in ISO 3166-2, part of the ISO 3166 standard published by the International Organization for Standardization (ISO), which defines codes for the names of the principal subdivisions (e.g., provinces or states) of all countries coded in ISO 3166-1.

Currently for Nepal, ISO 3166-2 codes are defined for seven provinces.

Each code consists of two parts separated by a hyphen. The first part is NP, the ISO 3166-1 alpha-2 code of Nepal. The second part is "P" followed by one digit (1–7).

== Current codes ==
Subdivision names are listed as in the ISO 3166-2 standard published by the ISO 3166 Maintenance Agency (ISO 3166/MA).

ISO 639-1 codes are used to represent subdivision names in the following administrative languages:

- (ne): Nepali
- (en): English

Click on the button in the header to sort each column.

Code	Subdivision (ne)		Subdivision name (ne) (Note: For reference only, Nepali name in Nepali script not included in the ISO 3166-2 standard.)	Subdivision (en)	
Code	Name	Local variant	Subdivision name (ne)	Name	Local variant
NP-P3	Bāgmatī	Pradesh 3	बागमती	Bagmati	Province 3
NP-P4	Gaṇḍakī	Pradesh 4	गण्डकी	Gandaki	Province 4
NP-P6	Karṇālī	Pradesh 6	कर्णाली	Karnali	Province 6
NP-P1	Koshī	Pradesh 1	कोशी	Koshi	Province 1
NP-P5	Lumbinī	Pradesh 5	कोशी	Lumbini	Province 5
NP-P2	Madhesh	Pradesh 2	मधेश	Madhesh	Province 2
NP-P7	Sudūrpashchim	Sudūr Pashchim; Pradesh 7	सुदूर-पश्चिम	Sudurpashchim	Sudūr Pashchim; Province 7

== Changes ==
The following changes to the entry have been announced by the ISO 3166/MA since the first publication of ISO 3166-2 in 1998. ISO stopped issuing newsletters in 2013.

Newsletter	Date issued	Description of change in newsletter
Newsletter II-1	2010-02-03 (corrected 2010-02-19)	Addition of the country code prefix as the first code element
Newsletter II-3	2011-12-13 (corrected 2011-12-15)	First level prefix addition, language adjustment, comment addition, deletion of the romanization system and source list update.
Online Browsing; Platform (OBP)	2018-11-26	Correction of the romanization system label; Addition of provinces NP-P1, NP-P2, NP-P3, NP-P4, NP-P5, NP-P6, NP-P7; Addition of local variation for NP-P4 and NP-P6; Update List Source; Addition of remark
Online Browsing; Platform (OBP)	2019-11-22	Update Code Source
Online Browsing; Platform (OBP)	2020-11-24	Change of subdivision name of NP-P3, NP-P7; Addition of local variation of NP-P3, NP-P7; Update List Source
Online Browsing; Platform (OBP)	2021-11-25	Change of spelling of NP-P5; Modification of remark part 2; Update List Source
Online Browsing; Platform (OBP)	2022-11-29	Deletion of development regions NP-1, NP-2, NP-3, NP-4, NP-5; Change of subdivision name of NP-P4, NP-P6 in nep; Change of subdivision name of NP-P2, NP-P7 in eng and nep; Change of subdivision name of NP-P3 in eng; Addition of location variation for NP-2 in eng and nep; Modification of local variation for NP-P7 in eng and nep; Deletion of zones NP-BA, NP-BH, NP-DH, NP-GA, NP-JA, NP-KA, NP-KO, NP-LU, NP-MA, NP-ME, NP-NA, NP-RA, NP-SA, NP-SE: Update List Source; Modification of remark part 2
Online Browsing; Platform (OBP)	2023-11-23	Change of subdivision name of NP-P1; Update List Source

== See also ==
- Subdivisions of Nepal
- FIPS region codes of Nepal
- Neighbouring countries: CN, IN
