= ISO 3166-2:SG =

Entry for Singapore in ISO 3166-2

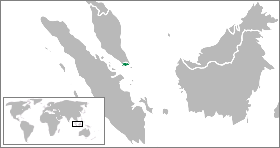
Location map for Singapore.

ISO 3166-2:SG is the entry for Singapore in ISO 3166-2, part of the ISO 3166 standard published by the International Organization for Standardization (ISO), which defines codes for the names of the principal subdivisions (e.g., provinces or states) of all countries coded in ISO 3166-1.

Currently for Singapore, ISO 3166-2 codes are defined for five districts.

Each code consists of two parts separated by a hyphen. The first part is SG, the ISO 3166-1 alpha-2 code of Singapore. The second part is two digits (01–05).

== Current codes ==
Subdivision names are listed as in the ISO 3166-2 standard published by the ISO 3166 Maintenance Agency (ISO 3166/MA).

Click on the button in the header to sort each column.

| Code | Subdivision name (en) | Subdivision name (ms) | Subdivision name (zh) | Subdivision name (ta) |
|---|---|---|---|---|
| SG-01 | Central Singapore | Pusat Singapura | 新加坡中部 | மத்திய சிங்கப்பூர் |
| SG-02 | North East | Timur laut | 东北 | வடகிழக்கு |
| SG-03 | North West | Barat laut | 西北 | வடமேற்கு |
| SG-04 | South East | Tenggara | 东南 | தென்கிழக்கு |
| SG-05 | South West | Barat daya | 西南 | தென்மேற்கு |

== Changes ==
The following changes to the entry have been announced in newsletters by the ISO 3166/MA since the first publication of ISO 3166-2 in 1998:

| Newsletter | Date issued | Description of change in newsletter | Code/Subdivision change |
|---|---|---|---|
| Newsletter I-9 | 2007-11-28 | Addition of administrative divisions and their codes | Subdivisions added: 5 districts |

== See also ==
- Subdivisions of Singapore
