= ISO 3166-2:WF =

Entry for Wallis and Futuna in ISO 3166-2

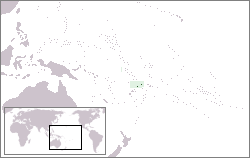
Wallis and Futuna

ISO 3166-2:WF is the entry for Wallis and Futuna in ISO 3166-2, part of the ISO 3166 standard published by the International Organization for Standardization (ISO), which defines codes for the names of the principal subdivisions (e.g., provinces or states) of all countries coded in ISO 3166-1.

Currently for Wallis and Futuna, ISO 3166-2 codes are defined for three administrative precincts.

Each code consists of two parts, separated by a hyphen. The first part is WF, the ISO 3166-1 alpha-2 code of Wallis and Futuna. The second part is two letters.

Wallis and Futuna, an overseas territorial collectivity of France, is officially assigned the ISO 3166-1 alpha-2 code WF. Moreover, it is also assigned the ISO 3166-2 code FR-WF under the entry for France.

== Current codes ==
Subdivision names are listed as in the ISO 3166-2 standard published by the ISO 3166 Maintenance Agency (ISO 3166/MA).

Code	Subdivision name (fr)
WF-AL	(Alo (Wallis and Futuna)) Alo
WF-SG	Sigave
WF-UV	(Uvea (Wallis and Futuna)) Uvea
