= ISO 3166-2:ID =

Entry for Indonesia in ISO 3166-2

ISO 3166-2:ID is the entry for Indonesia in ISO 3166-2, part of the ISO 3166 standard published by the International Organization for Standardization (ISO), which defines codes for the names of the principal subdivisions (e.g., provinces or states) of all countries coded in ISO 3166-1.

Currently for Indonesia, ISO 3166-2 codes are defined for two levels of subdivisions:

- seven geographical units (which are major islands or island groups)
- 36 provinces, one capital district and one special region

Each code consists of two parts, separated by a hyphen. The first part is ID, the ISO 3166-1 alpha-2 code of Indonesia. The second part is two letters.

== Current codes ==
Subdivision names are listed as in the ISO 3166-2 standard published by the ISO 3166 Maintenance Agency (ISO 3166/MA).

=== Geographical units ===
Geographical units of Indonesia according to ISO 3166-2:ID ID-SM ID-JW ID-KA ID-NU ID-SL ID-ML ID-PP

Code	Subdivision name (id)	Subdivision name (en)
ID-JW	Jawa	Java
ID-KA	Kalimantan	Kalimantan
ID-ML	Maluku	Moluccas
ID-NU	Nusa Tenggara	Lesser Sunda Islands
ID-PP	Papua	Western New Guinea
ID-SL	Sulawesi	Sulawesi
ID-SM	Sumatera	Sumatra

=== Provinces, capital district and special region ===
Code	Subdivision name (id)	Local variant	Subdivision name (en)	Subdivision type	Geographical unit
ID-AC	Aceh		Aceh	province	SM
ID-BA	Bali		Bali	province	NU
ID-BT	Banten		Banten	province	JW
ID-BE	Bengkulu		Bengkulu	province	SM
ID-GO	Gorontalo		Gorontalo	province	SL
ID-JK	Jakarta Raya	DKI Jakarta; DKI	Jakarta	capital district	JW
ID-JA	Jambi		Jambi	province	SM
ID-JB	Jawa Barat		West Java	province	JW
ID-JT	Jawa Tengah		Central Java	province	JW
ID-JI	Jawa Timur		East Java	province	JW
ID-KB	Kalimantan Barat		West Kalimantan	province	KA
ID-KS	Kalimantan Selatan		South Kalimantan	province	KA
ID-KT	Kalimantan Tengah		Central Kalimantan	province	KA
ID-KI	Kalimantan Timur		East Kalimantan	province	KA
ID-KU	Kalimantan Utara		North Kalimantan	province	KA
ID-BB	Kepulauan Bangka Belitung		Bangka Belitung Islands	province	SM
ID-KR	Kepulauan Riau		Riau Islands	province	SM
ID-LA	Lampung		Lampung	province	SM
ID-MA	Maluku		Maluku	province	ML
ID-MU	Maluku Utara		North Maluku	province	ML
ID-NB	Nusa Tenggara Barat		West Nusa Tenggara	province	NU
ID-NT	Nusa Tenggara Timur		East Nusa Tenggara	province	NU
ID-PA	Papua		Papua	province	PP
ID-PB	Papua Barat		West Papua	province	PP
ID-PD	Papua Barat Daya		Southwest Papua	province	PP
ID-PE	Papua Pengunungan		Highland Papua	province	PP
ID-PS	Papua Selatan		South Papua	province	PP
ID-PT	Papua Tengah		Central Papua	province	PP
ID-RI	Riau		Riau	province	SM
ID-SR	Sulawesi Barat		West Sulawesi	province	SL
ID-SN	Sulawesi Selatan		South Sulawesi	province	SL
ID-ST	Sulawesi Tengah		Central Sulawesi	province	SL
ID-SG	Sulawesi Tenggara		Southeast Sulawesi	province	SL
ID-SA	Sulawesi Utara		North Sulawesi	province	SL
ID-SB	Sumatera Barat		West Sumatra	province	SM
ID-SS	Sumatera Selatan		South Sumatra	province	SM
ID-SU	Sumatera Utara		North Sumatra	province	SM
ID-YO	Yogyakarta	DI Yogya; DIY	Yogyakarta	special region	JW

== Changes ==
The following changes to the entry have been announced in newsletters by the ISO 3166/MA since the first publication of ISO 3166-2 in 1998. ISO stopped issuing newsletters in 2013.

Newsletter	Date issued	Description of change in newsletter	Code/Subdivision change
Newsletter I-2	2002-05-21	Addition of four new provinces and deletion of one (ID-TT). Inclusion of one alternative name form and one changed province name (ID-PA, formerly ID-IJ)	Subdivisions added: ID-BB Bangka Belitung; ID-BT Banten; ID-GO Gorontalo; ID-MU Maluku Utara; Subdivisions deleted: ID-TT Timor Timur (see ISO 3166-2:TL); Codes: (to correct duplicate use); ID-IJ Irian Jaya (province) → ID-PA Papua
Newsletter I-4	2002-12-10	Change of name of one geographical unit	
Newsletter I-6	2004-03-08	Move "Aceh" to a new category of "autonomous province". Addition of a new province "Kepulauan Riau"	Subdivisions added: ID-KR Kepulauan Riau
Newsletter I-7	2005-09-13	Addition of a new province "Sulawesi Barat"	Subdivisions added: ID-SR Sulawesi Barat
Newsletter II-1	2010-02-03 (corrected 2010-02-19)	Addition of the country code prefix as the first code element, alphabetical re-ordering, administrative update	Subdivisions added: ID-PB Papua Barat
Newsletter II-3	2011-12-13 (corrected 2011-12-15)	Removal of duplicate code	Codes: Maluku (geographical unit) ID-MA → ID-ML

The following changes to the entry are listed on ISO's online catalogue, the Online Browsing Platform:

Effective date of change	Short description of change (en)
2010-02-19	Addition of the country code prefix as the first code element, alphabetical re-ordering, administrative update
2011-12-13	Removal of duplicate code
2014-10-30	Add province ID-KU; change code for Papua formerly ID-IJ; update List Source
2015-11-27	Update List Source
2016-11-15	Addition of local variation of ID-JK, ID-YO; change of spelling of ID-BB, update list source
2017-11-23	Change of spelling of category name in eng/fra from special district to capital district (ID-JK); change of category name from autonomous province to province for ID-AC; deletion of category autonomous province (eng) / province autonome (fra) / nanggroe (ind); update List Source
2022-11-29	Addition of provinces ID-PE, ID-PS and ID-PT; Update List Source
2023-11-23	Addition of province ID-PD; Update List Source

== See also ==
- Subdivisions of Indonesia
- FIPS region codes of Indonesia
- Neighbouring countries: MY, PG, TL
