= ISO 3166-2:KP =

Entry for North Korea in ISO 3166-2

ISO 3166-2:KP is the entry for North Korea (officially the Democratic People's Republic of Korea) in ISO 3166-2, part of the ISO 3166 standard published by the International Organization for Standardization (ISO), which defines codes for the names of the principal subdivisions (e.g., provinces or states) of all countries coded in ISO 3166-1.

Currently for North Korea, ISO 3166-2 codes are defined for two metropolitan cities, one capital city, one special city, and nine provinces. All of them except the metropolitan city are province-level subdivisions. The three special administrative regions, i.e. the Kaesong Industrial Region, the Mount Kumgang Tourist Region, and the Sinuiju Special Administrative Region, are not listed.

Each code consists of two parts, separated by a hyphen. The first part is KP, the ISO 3166-1 alpha-2 code of North Korea. The second part is two digits:

- 01: capital city
- 02–10: provinces
- 13: special city
- 14–15: metropolitan cities

== Current codes ==
Subdivision names are listed as in the ISO 3166-2 standard published by the ISO 3166 Maintenance Agency (ISO 3166/MA).

Click on the button in the header to sort each column.

Code	Subdivision name (ko) (McCune-Reischauer 1939) (Note: While the ISO 3166-2 standard uses carons (ǒ ǔ) except "Kaesŏng", the McCune–Reischauer system actually uses breves (ŏ ŭ).)	Subdivision name (ko) (KPS 11080:2002)	Subdivision name (ko) (Note: For reference only; Korean name in Korean script not included in the ISO 3166-2 standard.)	Subdivision name (en) (Note: For reference only; English name not included in the ISO 3166-2 standard.)	Subdivision category
KP-04	Chagang-do	Jakangto	자강도	Chagang	province
KP-09	Hamgyǒng-bukto	Hamkyeongpukto	함경북도	North Hamgyong	province
KP-08	Hamgyǒng-namdo	Hamkyeongnamto	함경남도	South Hamgyong	province
KP-06	Hwanghae-bukto	Hwanghaipukto	황해북도	North Hwanghae	province
KP-05	Hwanghae-namdo	Hwanghainamto	황해남도	South Hwanghae	province
KP-15	Kaesŏng	Kaeseong	개성	Kaesong	metropolitan city
KP-07	Kangwǒn-do	Kangweonto	강원도	Kangwon	province
KP-14	Namp’o	Nampho	남포	Nampo	metropolitan city
KP-03	P'yǒngan-bukto	Phyeonganpukto	평안북도	North Pyongan	province
KP-02	P'yǒngan-namdo	Phyeongannamto	평안남도	South Pyongan	province
KP-01	P'yǒngyang	Phyeongyang	평양	Pyongyang	capital city
KP-13	Rasǒn (Local variant: Najin Sǒnbong)	Raseon	라선 (Local variant: 라진 선봉)	Rason	special city
KP-10	Ryanggang-do	Ryangkangto	량강도	Ryanggang	province

== Changes ==
The following changes to the entry are listed on ISO's online catalogue, the Online Browsing Platform:

Effective date of change	Short description of change (en)
2017-11-23	Change of spelling of KP-10, KP-13 (McCune-Reischauer, 1939); addition of metropolitan city KP-14; update List Source.
2014-12-18	Deletion of the space between "de" and the parenthesis in the short French name lower case.
2010-02-19	Administrative update, replacement of alphabetical characters with numeric characters in second code element
2022-11-29	Addition of metropolitan city KP-15; Update List Source

The following changes to the entry have been announced in newsletters by the ISO 3166/MA since the first publication of ISO 3166-2 in 1998. ISO stopped issuing newsletters in 2013.

Newsletter	Date issued	Description of change in newsletter	Code/Subdivision change
Newsletter I-4	2002-12-10	Addition of one special city. Subdivision categories in header re-sorted	Subdivisions added: KP-NAJ Najin Sonbong-si
Newsletter I-6	2004-03-08	Spelling correction in header of list source	
Newsletter II-1	2010-02-03 (corrected 2010-02-19)	Administrative update, replacement of alphabetical characters with numeric characters in second code element	Subdivisions deleted: KP-KAE Kaesong-si; KP-NAM Nampo-si; Codes: format changed (see below)

=== Codes changed in Newsletter II-1 ===
Before	After	Subdivision name
KP-CHA	KP-04	Chagang-do
KP-HAB	KP-09	Hamgyongbuk-do
KP-HAN	KP-08	Hamgyongnam-do
KP-HWB	KP-06	Hwanghaebuk-do
KP-HWN	KP-05	Hwanghaenam-do
KP-KAN	KP-07	Kangwon-do
KP-PYB	KP-03	Pyonganbuk-do
KP-PYN	KP-02	Pyongannam-do
KP-YAN	KP-10	Yanggang-do
KP-NAJ	KP-13	Najin Sonbong-si
KP-PYO	KP-01	Pyongyang-si

== See also ==
- Subdivisions of North Korea
- FIPS region codes of North Korea
- Neighbouring countries: CN, KR, RU
