= ISO 3166-2:BY =

Entry for Belarus in ISO 3166-2

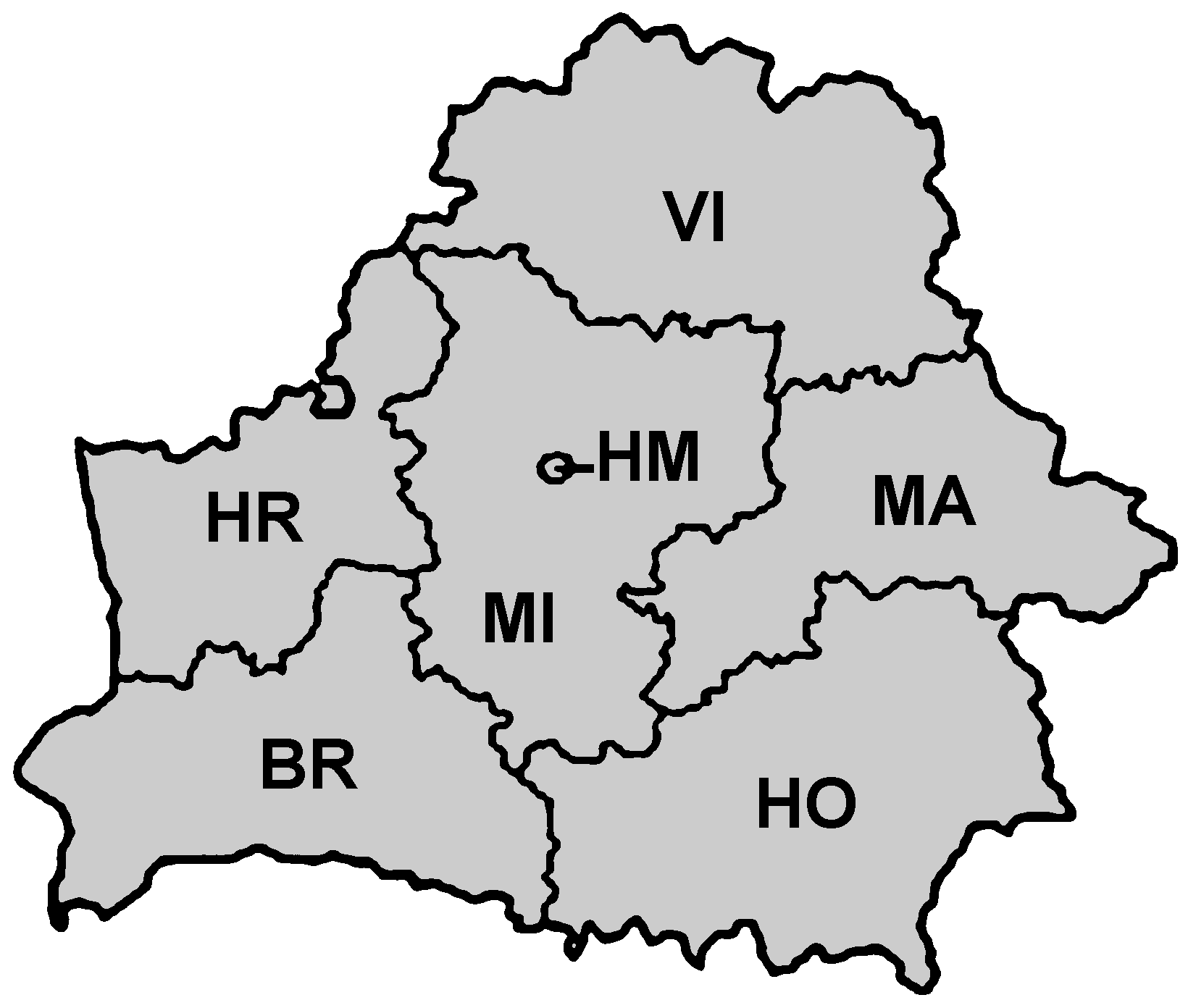

ISO 3166-2:BY is the entry for Belarus in ISO 3166-2, part of the ISO 3166 standard published by the International Organization for Standardization (ISO), which defines codes for the names of the principal subdivisions (e.g., provinces or states) of all countries coded in ISO 3166-1.

Currently for Belarus, ISO 3166-2 codes are defined for six oblasts and one city. The city Minsk is the capital of the country and has special status equal to the oblasts.

Each code consists of two parts, separated by a hyphen. The first part is BY, the ISO 3166-1 alpha-2 code of Belarus. The second part is two letters.

== Current codes ==
Subdivision names are listed as in the ISO 3166-2 standard published by the ISO 3166 Maintenance Agency (ISO 3166/MA).

ISO 639-1 codes are used to represent subdivision names in the following administrative languages:

- (be): Belarusian — Romanization system: BGN/PCGN 1979, UN X/6 2012
- (ru): Russian — Romanization system: BGN/PCGN 1947, GOST 1983 = UN V/18 1987

Click on the button in the header to sort each column.

Code	Subdivision name (be)			Subdivision name (ru)			Subdivision name (en) (Note: For reference only, English name not included in the ISO 3166-2 standard.)	Subd. cat.			
Code	(BGN/PCGN 1979)	(UN X/6 2012)	(Note: For reference only, Belarusian name in Cyrillic script not included in the ISO 3166-2 standard.)	(BGN/PCGN 1947)	(GOST 1983 = UN V/18 1987)	(Note: For reference only, Russian name in Cyrillic script not included in the ISO 3166-2 standard.)	Subdivision name (en)	Subd. cat.			
Code	BY-BR	Brestskaya voblasts'	Bresckaja voblasć	Брэсцкая вобласць	Brestskaya oblast'	Brestskaja oblast'	Subdivision name (en)	Subd. cat.	Брестская область	Brest	oblast
BY-HO	Homyel'skaya voblasts'	Homieĺskaja voblasć	Гомельская вобласць	Gomel'skaya oblast'	Gomel'skaja oblast'	Гомельская область	Gomel	oblast			
BY-HM	Horad Minsk	Horad Minsk	Горад Мінск	Gorod Minsk	Gorod Minsk	Город Минск	Minsk City	city			
BY-HR	Hrodzyenskaya voblasts'	Hrodzienskaja voblasć	Гродзенская вобласць	Grodnenskaya oblast'	Grodnenskaja oblast'	Гродненская область	Grodno	oblast			
BY-MA	Mahilyowskaya voblasts'	Mahilioŭskaja voblasć	Магілёўская вобласць	Mogilevskaya oblast'	Mogilevskaja oblast'	Могилёвская область	Mogilev	oblast			
BY-MI	Minskaya voblasts'	Minskaja voblasć	Мінская вобласць	Minskaya oblast'	Minskaja oblast'	Минская область	Minsk	oblast			
BY-VI	Vitsyebskaya voblasts'	Viciebskaja voblasć	Віцебская вобласць	Vitebskaya oblast'	Vitebskaja oblast'	Витебская область	Vitebsk	oblast			

== Changes ==
The following changes to the entry have been announced by the ISO 3166/MA since the first publication of ISO 3166-2 in 1998. ISO stopped issuing newsletters in 2013.

Newsletter	Date issued	Description of change in newsletter	Code/Subdivision change
Newsletter I-1	2000-06-21	Correction of spelling mistakes and language code elements	
Newsletter II-2	2010-06-30	Update of the administrative structure and of the list source	Subdivisions added: BY-HM Horad Minsk
Online Browsing; Platform (OBP)	2015-11-27	Change romanization system from "GOST 1983" to "Belarusian Lacinka" of bel; change romanization system of BY-HM* of bel and rus	
Online Browsing; Platform (OBP)	2018-11-26	Correction of the romanization system label	
Online Browsing; Platform (OBP)	2020-11-24	Correction of spelling for BY-HR of BGN/PCGN 1979	

== See also ==
- Subdivisions of Belarus
- FIPS region codes of Belarus
- Neighbouring countries: LT, LV, PL, RU, UA
