= ISO 3166-2:KN =

Entry for Saint Kitts and Nevis in ISO 3166-2

ISO 3166-2:KN is the entry for Saint Kitts and Nevis in ISO 3166-2, part of the ISO 3166 standard published by the International Organization for Standardization (ISO), which defines codes for the names of the principal subdivisions (e.g., provinces or states) of all countries coded in ISO 3166-1.

Currently for Saint Kitts and Nevis, ISO 3166-2 codes are defined for two levels of subdivisions:

- two states (i.e., the islands of Saint Kitts and Nevis)
- 14 parishes

Each code consists of two parts separated by a hyphen. The first part is KN, the ISO 3166-1 alpha-2 code of Saint Kitts and Nevis. The second part is either of the following:

- one letter: states
- two digits (01–15 except 14): parishes

== Current codes ==
Subdivision names are listed as in the ISO 3166-2 standard published by the ISO 3166 Maintenance Agency (ISO 3166/MA).

Click on the button in the header to sort each column.

=== States ===
Code	Subdivision name (en)
KN-K	Saint Kitts
KN-N	Nevis

=== Parishes ===
Code	Subdivision name (en)	Abbreviation (Note: For reference only, abbreviation not included in the ISO 3166-2 standard.)	In state
KN-01	Christ Church Nichola Town	CCN	K
KN-02	Saint Anne Sandy Point	ASP	K
KN-03	Saint George Basseterre	GBA	K
KN-04	Saint George Gingerland	GGI	N
KN-05	Saint James Windward	JWI	N
KN-06	Saint John Capisterre	JCA	K
KN-07	Saint John Figtree	JFI	N
KN-08	Saint Mary Cayon	MCA	K
KN-09	Saint Paul Capisterre	PCA	K
KN-10	Saint Paul Charlestown	PCH	N
KN-11	Saint Peter Basseterre	PBS	K
KN-12	Saint Thomas Lowland	TLO	N
KN-13	Saint Thomas Middle Island	TMI	K
KN-15	Trinity Palmetto Point	TPP	K

== Changes ==
The following changes to the entry have been announced in newsletters by the ISO 3166/MA since the first publication of ISO 3166-2 in 1998:

Newsletter	Date issued	Description of change in newsletter	Code/Subdivision change
Newsletter I-8	2007-04-17	Addition of the administrative subdivisions and of their code elements	Subdivisions added: 2 states, 14 parishes
Newsletter II-1	2010-02-03 (corrected 2010-02-19)	Addition of the country code prefix as the first code element	

== See also ==
- Subdivisions of Saint Kitts and Nevis
- FIPS region codes of Saint Kitts and Nevis
