= ISO 3166-2:PW =

Entry for Palau in ISO 3166-2

ISO 3166-2:PW is the entry for Palau in ISO 3166-2, part of the ISO 3166 standard published by the International Organization for Standardization (ISO), which defines codes for the names of the principal subdivisions (e.g., provinces or states) of all countries coded in ISO 3166-1.

Currently for Palau, ISO 3166-2 codes are defined for 16 states.

Each code consists of two parts, separated by a hyphen. The first part is PW, the ISO 3166-1 alpha-2 code of Palau. The second part is three digits, which is the old FIPS 6-4 code of the state.

== Current codes ==
Subdivision names are listed as in the ISO 3166-2 standard published by the ISO 3166 Maintenance Agency (ISO 3166/MA).

Click on the button in the header to sort each column.

Code	Subdivision name (en, pau)
PW-002	Aimeliik
PW-004	Airai
PW-010	Angaur
PW-050	Hatohobei
PW-100	Kayangel
PW-150	Koror
PW-212	Melekeok
PW-214	Ngaraard
PW-218	Ngarchelong
PW-222	Ngardmau
PW-224	Ngatpang
PW-226	Ngchesar
PW-227	Ngeremlengui
PW-228	Ngiwal
PW-350	Peleliu
PW-370	Sonsorol

== Changes ==
The following changes to the entry have been announced by the ISO 3166/MA since the first publication of ISO 3166-2 in 1998. ISO stopped issuing newsletters in 2013.

Newsletter	Date issued	Description of change in newsletter	Code/Subdivision change
Newsletter I-8	2007-04-17	Addition of the administrative subdivisions and of their code elements	Subdivisions added: 16 states
Online Browsing; Platform (OBP)	2016-11-15	Change of spelling of PW-050 in eng, pau; update list source	Name changed: PW-050 Hatobohei → Hatohobei

== See also ==
- Subdivisions of Palau
- FIPS region codes of Palau
