= ISO 3166-2:SH =

Entry for Saint Helena, Ascension and Tristan da Cunha in ISO 3166-2

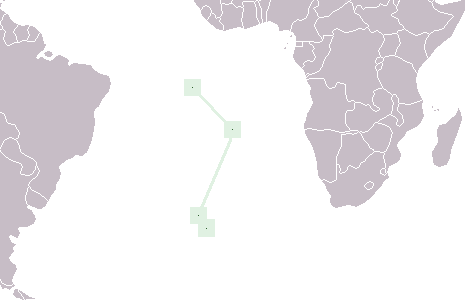
Location of St Helena, Ascension and Tristan

ISO 3166-2:SH is the entry for Saint Helena, Ascension and Tristan da Cunha in ISO 3166-2, part of the ISO 3166 standard published by the International Organization for Standardization (ISO), which defines codes for the names of the principal subdivisions (e.g., provinces or states) of all countries coded in ISO 3166-1.

Currently for Saint Helena, Ascension and Tristan da Cunha, ISO 3166-2 codes are defined for three geographical entities.

Each code consists of two parts separated by a hyphen. The first part is SH, the ISO 3166-1 alpha-2 code of Saint Helena, Ascension and Tristan da Cunha. The second part is two letters.

Ascension Island and Tristan da Cunha, previously dependencies of Saint Helena but raised to equal status in 2009, are exceptionally reserved the ISO 3166-1 alpha-2 codes AC and TA respectively on the request of the Universal Postal Union.

== Current codes ==
Subdivision names are listed as in the ISO 3166-2 standard published by the ISO 3166 Maintenance Agency (ISO 3166/MA).

Click on the button in the header to sort each column.

Code	Subdivision name (en)
SH-AC	Ascension
SH-HL	Saint Helena
SH-TA	Tristan da Cunha

== Changes ==
The following changes to the entry have been announced in newsletters by the ISO 3166/MA since the first publication of ISO 3166–2 in 1998:

Newsletter	Date issued	Description of change in newsletter	Code/Subdivision change
Newsletter II-2	2010-06-30	Consistency between ISO 3166-1 and ISO 3166-2 for change of name (in accordance with ISO 3166-1 Newsletter VI-7)	
Newsletter II-3	2011-12-13 (corrected 2011-12-15)	Administrative subdivisions addition.	Subdivisions added: 3 geographical entities

=== Codes deleted in ISO 3166-2:2007 ===
In the first edition of ISO 3166-2, the following codes were defined for 1 administrative area and 2 dependencies, but they are no longer defined since the second edition (ISO 3166-2:2007, published on 2007-12-13).

Former code	Subdivision name	Subdivision category
SH-HL	Saint Helena	administrative area
SH-AC	Ascension	dependency
SH-TA	Tristan da Cunha	dependency

== See also ==
- FIPS region codes of Saint Helena
