= ISO 3166-2:KG =

Entry for Kyrgyzstan in ISO 3166-2

ISO 3166-2:KG is the entry for Kyrgyzstan in ISO 3166-2, part of the ISO 3166 standard published by the International Organization for Standardization (ISO), which defines codes for the names of the principal subdivisions (e.g., provinces or states) of all countries coded in ISO 3166-1.

Currently for Kyrgyzstan, ISO 3166-2 codes are defined for two cities and seven regions. The cities Bishkek and Osh have special status equal to the regions.

Each code consists of two parts, separated by a hyphen. The first part is KG, the ISO 3166-1 alpha-2 code of Kyrgyzstan. The second part is either of the following:

- one letter: regions
- two letters: city

== Current codes ==
Subdivision names are listed as in the ISO 3166-2 standard published by the ISO 3166 Maintenance Agency (ISO 3166/MA).

ISO 639-1 codes are used to represent subdivision names in the following administrative languages:

- (ky): Kyrgyz
- (ru): Russian

Click on the button in the header to sort each column.

Code	Subdivision name (ky) (BGN/PCGN 1979)	Subdivision name (ky) (Note: For reference only, Kyrgyz name in Cyrillic script not included in the ISO 3166-2 standard.)	Subdivision name (ru) (BGN/PCGN 1947)	Subdivision name (ru) (GOST 1983 = UN V/18 1987)	Subdivision name (ru) (Note: For reference only, Russian name in Cyrillic script not included in the ISO 3166-2 standard.)	Subdivision name (en) (Note: For reference only, English name not included in the ISO 3166-2 standard.)	Subdiv. cat.
KG-B	Batken	Баткен	Batkenskaya oblast'	Batkenskaja oblast'	Баткенская область	Batken	region
KG-GB	Bishkek Shaary	Бишкек шаары	Gorod Bishkek	Gorod Biškek	Город Бишкек	Bishkek	city
KG-C	Chüy	Чүй	Chuyskaya oblast'	Čujskaja oblast'	Чуйская область	Chuy	region
KG-J	Jalal-Abad	Жалал-Абад	Dzhalal-Abadskaya oblast'	Džalal-Abadskaja oblast'	Джалал-Абадская область	Jalal-Abad	region
KG-N	Naryn	Нарын	Narynskaya oblast'	Narynskaja oblast'	Нарынская область	Naryn	region
KG-O	Osh	Ош	Oshskaya oblast'	Ošskaja oblast'	Ошская область	Osh	region
KG-GO	Osh Shaary	Ош шаары	Gorod Osh	Gorod Oš	Город Ош	Osh City	city
KG-T	Talas	Талас	Talasskaya oblast'	Talasskaja oblast'	Таласская область	Talas	region
KG-Y	Ysyk-Köl	Ысык-Көл	Issyk-Kul'skaya oblast'	Issyk-Kul'skaja oblast'	Иссык-Кульская область	Issyk-Kul	region

== Changes ==
The following changes to the entry have been announced in newsletters by the ISO 3166/MA since the first publication of ISO 3166-2 in 1998:

Newsletter	Date issued	Description of change in newsletter	Code/Subdivision change
Newsletter I-4	2002-12-10	Addition of one region and one city. One spelling correction	Subdivisions added: KG-GB Bishkek; KG-B Batken
Online Browsing Platform (OBP)	2020-11-24	Correction of subdivision category in kir replacing oblast with oblus; Correction of subdivision names KG-GB, KG-GO in kir; Update List Source	

== See also ==
- Subdivisions of Kyrgyzstan
- FIPS region codes of Kyrgyzstan
- Neighbouring countries: CN, KZ, TJ, UZ
