= ISO 3166-2:FM =

Entry for the Federated States of Micronesia in ISO 3166-2

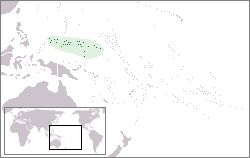
Location of Micronesia

ISO 3166-2:FM is the entry for the Federated States of Micronesia in ISO 3166-2, part of the ISO 3166 standard published by the International Organization for Standardization (ISO), which defines codes for the names of the principal subdivisions (e.g., provinces or states) of all countries coded in ISO 3166-1.

Currently for the Federated States of Micronesia, ISO 3166-2 codes are defined for four states.

Each code consists of two parts, separated by a hyphen. The first part is FM, the ISO 3166-1 alpha-2 code of the Federated States of Micronesia. The second part is three letters. The code for Chuuk (FM-TRK) is based on its former name, Truk.

== Current codes ==
Subdivision names are listed as in the ISO 3166-2 standard published by the ISO 3166 Maintenance Agency (ISO 3166/MA).

Click on the button in the header to sort each column.

Code	Subdivision name (en)
FM-TRK	Chuuk
FM-KSA	Kosrae
FM-PNI	Pohnpei
FM-YAP	Yap

== Changes ==
The following changes to the entry are listed on ISO's online catalogue, the Online Browsing Platform:

Effective date of change	Short description of change (en)
2014-12-18	Alignment of the English and French short names upper and lower case with UNTERM
2014-11-03	Update List Source

== See also ==
- Subdivisions of the Federated States of Micronesia
- FIPS region codes of the Federated States of Micronesia
