= ISO 3166-2:MY =

Entry for Malaysia in ISO 3166-2

ISO 3166-2:MY is the entry for Malaysia in ISO 3166-2, part of the ISO 3166 standard published by the International Organization for Standardization (ISO), which defines codes for the names of the principal subdivisions (e.g., provinces or states) of all countries coded in ISO 3166-1.

Currently for Malaysia, ISO 3166-2 codes are defined for three federal territories and 13 states.

Each code consists of two parts, separated by a hyphen. The first part is MY, the ISO 3166-1 alpha-2 code of Malaysia. The second part is two digits:

- 01–13: states
- 14–16: federal territories

== Current codes ==
Subdivision names are listed as in the ISO 3166-2 standard published by the ISO 3166 Maintenance Agency (ISO 3166/MA).

Click on the button in the header to sort each column.

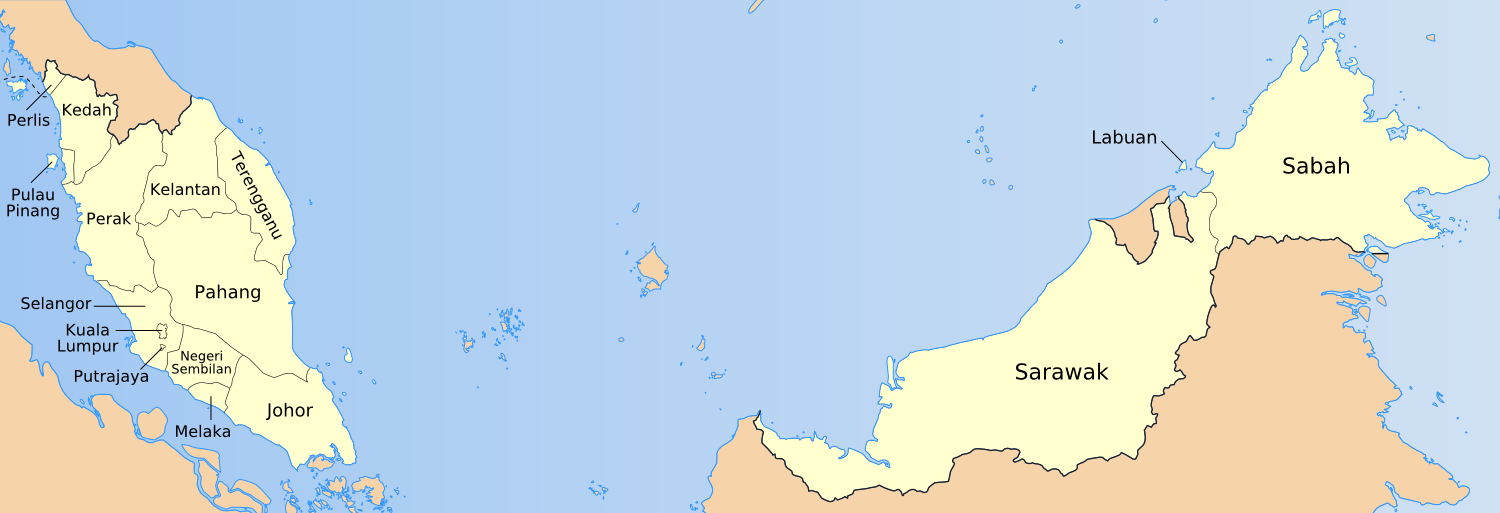

Code	Subdivision name (ms)	Subdivision category
MY-01	Johor	state
MY-02	Kedah	state
MY-03	Kelantan	state
MY-04	Melaka	state
MY-05	Negeri Sembilan	state
MY-06	Pahang	state
MY-08	Perak	state
MY-09	Perlis	state
MY-07	Pulau Pinang	state
MY-12	Sabah	state
MY-13	Sarawak	state
MY-10	Selangor	state
MY-11	Terengganu	state
MY-14	Wilayah Persekutuan Kuala Lumpur	federal territory
MY-15	Wilayah Persekutuan Labuan	federal territory
MY-16	Wilayah Persekutuan Putrajaya	federal territory

== Changes ==
The following changes to the entry have been announced in newsletters by the ISO 3166/MA since the first publication of ISO 3166-2 in 1998:

Newsletter	Date issued	Description of change in newsletter	Code/Subdivision change
Newsletter I-5	2003-09-05	Addition of one federal territory. Inclusion of new codes. List source updated. Code source updated	Subdivisions added: MY-16 Wilayah Persekutuan Putrajaya; Codes: format changed (see below)

=== Codes changed in Newsletter I-5 ===
The letters in the former codes are currently used in vehicle registration plates, except Sabah and Sarawak which use S and Q respectively.

Before	After	Subdivision name (ms)
MY-W	MY-14	Wilayah Persekutuan Kuala Lumpur
MY-L	MY-15	Wilayah Persekutuan Labuan
MY-J	MY-01	Johor
MY-K	MY-02	Kedah
MY-D	MY-03	Kelantan
MY-M	MY-04	Melaka
MY-N	MY-05	Negeri Sembilan
MY-C	MY-06	Pahang
MY-A	MY-08	Perak
MY-R	MY-09	Perlis
MY-P	MY-07	Pulau Pinang
MY-SA	MY-12	Sabah
MY-SK	MY-13	Sarawak
MY-B	MY-10	Selangor
MY-T	MY-11	Terengganu

== See also ==
- Subdivisions of Malaysia
- FIPS region codes of Malaysia
- Neighbouring countries: BN, ID, TH
