= ISO 3166-2:QA =

Entry for Qatar in ISO 3166-2

ISO 3166-2:QA is the entry for Qatar in ISO 3166-2, part of the ISO 3166 standard published by the International Organization for Standardization (ISO), which defines codes for the names of the principal subdivisions (e.g., provinces or states) of all countries coded in ISO 3166-1.

Currently for Qatar, ISO 3166-2 codes are defined for eight municipalities.

Each code consists of two parts separated by a hyphen. The first part is QA, the ISO 3166-1 alpha-2 code of Qatar. The second part is two letters.

== Current codes ==
Subdivision names are listed as in the ISO 3166-2 standard published by the ISO 3166 Maintenance Agency (ISO 3166/MA).

Click on the button in the header to sort each column.

Code	Subdivision name (ar) (BGN/PCGN 1956)	Subdivision name (ar) (Note: For reference only, Arabic name in Arabic script is not included in the ISO 3166-2 standard.)	Subdivision name (en) (Note: For reference only, English name not included in the ISO 3166-2 standard.)
QA-DA	Ad Dawḩah	الدوحة	Doha
QA-KH	Al Khawr wa adh Dhakhīrah	الخور والذخيرة	Khor
QA-WA	Al Wakrah	الوكرة	Wakra
QA-RA	Ar Rayyān	الريان	Rayyan
QA-MS	Ash Shamāl	ٱلشَّمَال	North
QA-SH	Ash Shīḩānīyah	الشحانية	Shahaniya
QA-ZA	Az̧ Z̧a‘āyin	الضعاين	Daayen
QA-US	Umm Şalāl	أم صلال	Umm Salal

== Changes ==
The following changes to the entry have been announced in newsletters by the ISO 3166/MA since the first publication of ISO 3166-2 in 1998. ISO stopped issuing newsletters in 2013.

Newsletter	Date issued	Description of change in newsletter	Code/Subdivision change
Newsletter II-3	2011-12-13 (corrected 2011-12-15)	Update resulting from the addition of names in administrative languages, and update of the administrative structure and of the list source	Subdivisions added: QA-ZA Az̧ Za̧`āyin; Subdivisions deleted: QA-GH Al Ghuwayrīyah; QA-JU Al Jumaylīyah; QA-JB Jarīyān al Bāţnah

The following changes to the entry are listed on ISO's online catalogue, the Online Browsing Platform:

Effective date of change	Short description of change (en)
2011-12-13	Update resulting from the addition of names in administrative languages, and update of the administrative structure and of the list source
2017-11-23	Addition of municipality QA-SH

== See also ==
- Subdivisions of Qatar
- FIPS region codes of Qatar
- Neighbouring country: SA
