= ISO 3166-2:TJ =

Entry for Tajikistan in ISO 3166-2

ISO 3166-2:TJ is the entry for Tajikistan in ISO 3166-2, part of the ISO 3166 standard published by the International Organization for Standardization (ISO), which defines codes for the names of the principal subdivisions (e.g., provinces or states) of all countries coded in ISO 3166-1.

Currently for Tajikistan, ISO 3166-2 codes are defined for one autonomous region, two regions, one capital territory and one district under republic administration.

Each code consists of two parts separated by a hyphen. The first part is TJ, the ISO 3166-1 alpha-2 code of Tajikistan. The second part is two letters.

== Current codes ==
Subdivision names are listed as in the ISO 3166-2 standard published by the ISO 3166 Maintenance Agency (ISO 3166/MA).

Click on the button in the header to sort each column.

Code	Subdivision name (tg) (BGN/PCGN 1994)	Subdivision name (tg) (Note: For reference only, Tajik name in Cyrillic script not included in the ISO 3166-2 standard.)	Subdivision name (ru) (Note: For reference only, Russian name in Cyrillic script not included in the ISO 3166-2 standard.)	Subdivision name (en) (Note: For reference only, English name not included in the ISO 3166-2 standard.)	Subdivision category
TJ-DU	Dushanbe	Душанбе	Душанбе	Dushanbe	capital territory
TJ-KT	Khatlon	Хатлон	Хатлон	Khatlon	region
TJ-GB	Kŭhistoni Badakhshon	Кӯҳистони Бадахшон	Горный Бадахшан	Gorno-Badakhshan	autonomous region
TJ-RA	nohiyahoi tobei jumhurí	ноҳияҳои тобеи ҷумҳурӣ	районы республиканского подчинения	districts under government jurisdiction	districts under republic administration
TJ-SU	Sughd	Суғд	Согд	Sughd	region

== Changes ==
The following changes to the entry are listed on ISO's online catalogue, the Online Browsing Platform:

Effective date of change	Short description of change	Code/Subdivision change
2017-11-23	Change of subdivision name of TJ-RA; change of spelling of category name in eng, tgk; update List Source; modification of the English remark part 2	Spelling change: TJ-RA Nohiyahoi Tobei Jumhurí → nohiyahoi tobei jumhurí
2016-11-15	Modification of the remark part 2; addition of category name Districts Under Republic Administration in eng, fra, tgk; addition of Districts Under Republic Administration TJ-RA; update list source	Subdivision added: TJ-RA Nohiyahoi Tobei Jumhurí
2015-02-12	Removed the reference to Dushanbe in remark part 2; correct spelling of DU	
2014-11-03	Add 1 capital territory TJ-DU	Subdivision added: TJ-DU

The following changes to the entry have been announced in newsletters by the ISO 3166/MA since the first publication of ISO 3166-2 in 1998. ISO stopped issuing newsletters in 2013.

Newsletter	Date issued	Description of change in newsletter	Code/Subdivision change
Newsletter I-4	2002-12-10	Change of name of one region. Deletion of one region. Introduction of one Tajik name form. Subdivision categories in header re-sorted	Subdivision deleted: TJ-KR Karategin; Codes: TJ-LN Leninabad → TJ-SU Sughd

== See also ==
- Subdivisions of Tajikistan
- FIPS region codes of Tajikistan
- Neighbouring countries: AF, CN, KG, UZ
