= ISO 3166-2:HT =

Entry for Haiti in ISO 3166-2

ISO 3166-2:HT is the entry for Haiti in ISO 3166-2, part of the ISO 3166 standard published by the International Organization for Standardization (ISO), which defines codes for the names of the principal subdivisions (e.g., provinces or states) of all countries coded in ISO 3166-1.

Currently for Haiti, ISO 3166-2 codes are defined for ten departments.

Each code consists of two parts, separated by a hyphen. The first part is HT, the ISO 3166-1 alpha-2 code of Haiti. The second part is two letters.

== Current codes ==
Subdivision names are listed as in the ISO 3166-2 standard published by the ISO 3166 Maintenance Agency (ISO 3166/MA).

ISO 639-1 codes are used to represent subdivision names in the following administrative languages:

- (fr): French
- (ht): Haitian Creole

Click on the button in the header to sort each column.

Code	Subdivision name (fr)	Subdivision name (ht)	Subdivision name (en) (Note: For reference only, English name not included in the ISO 3166-2 standard.)
HT-AR	Artibonite	Latibonit	Artibonite
HT-CE	Centre	Sant	Center
HT-GA	Grande’Anse	Grandans	Big Cove
HT-NI	Nippes	Nip	Nippes
HT-ND	Nord	Nò	North
HT-NE	Nord-Est	Nòdès	Northeast
HT-NO	Nord-Ouest	Nòdwès	Northwest
HT-OU	Ouest	Lwès	West
HT-SD	Sud	Sid	South
HT-SE	Sud-Est	Sidès	Southeast

== Changes ==
The following changes to the entry have been announced in newsletters by the ISO 3166/MA since the first publication of ISO 3166-2 in 1998. ISO stopped issuing newsletters in 2013.

Edition/Newsletter	Date issued	Description of change in newsletter	Code/Subdivision change
ISO 3166-2:2007	2007-12-13	Second edition of ISO 3166-2 (this change was not announced in a newsletter)	Subdivisions added: HT-NI Nippes
Newsletter II-3	2011-12-13 (corrected 2011-12-15)	Language adjustment.	

The following changes to the entry are listed on ISO's online catalogue, the Online Browsing Platform:

Effective date of change	Short description of change (en)
2015-11-27	Change of spelling of HT-GA; update List Source

== See also ==
- Subdivisions of Haiti
- FIPS region codes of Haiti
- Neighbouring country: DO
