= ISO 3166-2:AG =

Entry for Antigua and Barbuda in ISO 3166-2

ISO 3166-2:AG is the entry for Antigua and Barbuda in ISO 3166-2, part of the ISO 3166 standard published by the International Organization for Standardization (ISO), which defines codes for the names of the principal subdivisions (e.g., provinces or states) of all countries coded in ISO 3166-1.

Currently for Antigua and Barbuda, ISO 3166-2 codes are defined for six parishes and two dependencies.

Each code consists of two parts, separated by a hyphen. The first part is AG, the ISO 3166-1 alpha-2 code of Antigua and Barbuda. The second part is two digits:

- 03–08: parishes (all on the island of Antigua)
- 10–11: dependencies (Barbuda and Redonda)

== Current codes ==
Subdivision names are listed as in the ISO 3166-2 standard published by the ISO 3166 Maintenance Agency (ISO 3166/MA).

Click on the button in the header to sort each column.

Code	Subdivision name (en)	Subdivision category
AG-03	Saint George	parish
AG-04	Saint John	parish
AG-05	Saint Mary	parish
AG-06	Saint Paul	parish
AG-07	Saint Peter	parish
AG-08	Saint Philip	parish
AG-10	Barbuda	dependency
AG-11	Redonda	dependency

== Changes ==
The following changes to the entry have been announced by the ISO 3166/MA since the first publication of ISO 3166-2 in 1998. ISO stopped issuing newsletters in 2013.

Newsletter	Date issued	Description of change in newsletter	Code/Subdivision change
Newsletter I-8	2007-04-17	Addition of the administrative subdivisions and of their code elements	Subdivisions added: 6 parishes, 1 dependency
Newsletter II-2	2010-06-30	Update of the administrative structure and of the list source	Subdivisions added: AG-11 Redonda
Online Browsing; Platform (OBP)	2010-06-30	Update of the administrative structure and of the list source	
Online Browsing; Platform (OBP)	2014-10-29	Change spelling of AG-04	

== See also ==
- Subdivisions of Antigua and Barbuda
- FIPS region codes of Antigua and Barbuda
