= ISO 3166-2:SB =

Entry for Solomon Islands in ISO 3166-2

ISO 3166-2:SB is the entry for Solomon Islands in ISO 3166-2, part of the ISO 3166 standard published by the International Organization for Standardization (ISO), which defines codes for the names of the principal subdivisions (e.g., provinces or states) of all countries coded in ISO 3166-1.

Currently for Solomon Islands, ISO 3166-2 codes are defined for one capital territory and nine provinces. The capital of the country Honiara forms the Capital Territory and has special status equal to the provinces.

Each code consists of two parts separated by a hyphen. The first part is SB, the ISO 3166-1 alpha-2 code of Solomon Islands. The second part is two letters.

== Current codes ==
Subdivision names are listed as in the ISO 3166-2 standard published by the ISO 3166 Maintenance Agency (ISO 3166/MA).

Click on the button in the header to sort each column.

Code	Subdivision name (en)	Subdivision category
SB-CT	Capital Territory (Honiara)	capital territory
SB-CE	Central	province
SB-CH	Choiseul	province
SB-GU	Guadalcanal	province
SB-IS	Isabel	province
SB-MK	Makira-Ulawa	province
SB-ML	Malaita	province
SB-RB	Rennell and Bellona	province
SB-TE	Temotu	province
SB-WE	Western	province

== Changes ==
The following changes to the entry have been announced in newsletters by the ISO 3166/MA since the first publication of ISO 3166-2 in 1998. ISO stopped issuing newsletters in 2013.

Newsletter	Date issued	Description of change in newsletter	Code/Subdivision change
Newsletter I-8	2007-04-17	Modification of the administrative structure	Subdivisions added: SB-CH Choiseul; SB-RB Rennell and Bellona

The following changes to the entry are listed on ISO's online catalogue, the Online Browsing Platform:

Effective date of change	Short description of change (en)
2014-12-18	Alignment of the English short name lower case with UNTERM
2014-11-03	Update List Source

== See also ==
- Provinces of Solomon Islands
- FIPS region codes of Solomon Islands
