= ISO 3166-2 =

ISO standard country subdivision codes

ISO 3166-2 is part of the ISO 3166 standard published by the International Organization for Standardization (ISO), and defines codes for identifying the principal subdivisions (e.g., provinces or states) of all countries coded in ISO 3166-1. The official name of the standard is Codes for the representation of names of countries and their subdivisions – Part 2: Country subdivision code. It was first published in 1998.

The purpose of ISO 3166-2 is to establish an international standard of short and unique alphanumeric codes to represent the relevant administrative divisions and dependent territories of all countries in a more convenient and less ambiguous form than their full names. Each complete ISO 3166-2 code consists of two parts, separated by a hyphen:

- The first part is the ISO 3166-1 alpha-2 code of the country;
- The second part is a string of up to three alphanumeric characters, which is usually obtained from national sources and stems from coding systems already in use in the country concerned, but may also be developed by the ISO itself.

Each complete ISO 3166-2 code can then be used to uniquely identify a country subdivision in a global context.

As of 23 November 2023 there are 5,046 codes defined in ISO 3166-2. For some countries, codes are defined for more than one level of subdivisions.

== Current codes ==
The following table can be used to access the current ISO 3166-2 codes of each country, and comprises three columns:

- Entry: ISO 3166-1 alpha-2 code, click to view the ISO 3166-2 codes of the country
- Country name: English short name officially used by the ISO 3166 Maintenance Agency (ISO 3166/MA)
- Subdivisions assigned codes: Number and category of subdivisions assigned codes in ISO 3166-2; if there are more than one level of subdivisions, the first-level subdivisions are shown in italics

| Entry (click to view codes) | Country name (using title case) | Subdivisions assigned codes |
|---|---|---|
| AD | Andorra | 7 parishes |
| AE | United Arab Emirates | 7 emirates |
| AF | Afghanistan | 34 provinces |
| AG | Antigua and Barbuda | 6 parishes 2 dependencies |
| AI | Anguilla | — |
| AL | Albania | 12 counties |
| AM | Armenia | 1 city 10 regions |
| AO | Angola | 18 provinces |
| AQ | Antarctica | — |
| AR | Argentina | 1 city 23 provinces |
| AS | American Samoa | — |
| AT | Austria | 9 states |
| AU | Australia | 6 states 2 territories |
| AW | Aruba | — |
| AX | Åland Islands | — |
| AZ | Azerbaijan | 1 autonomous republic 11 municipalities 66 rayons |
| BA | Bosnia and Herzegovina | 2 entities 1 district with special status |
| BB | Barbados | 11 parishes |
| BD | Bangladesh | 8 divisions 64 districts |
| BE | Belgium | 3 regions 10 provinces |
| BF | Burkina Faso | 13 regions 45 provinces |
| BG | Bulgaria | 28 regions |
| BH | Bahrain | 4 governorates |
| BI | Burundi | 18 provinces |
| BJ | Benin | 12 departments |
| BL | Saint Barthélemy | — |
| BM | Bermuda | — |
| BN | Brunei Darussalam | 4 districts |
| BO | Bolivia, Plurinational State of | 9 departments |
| BQ | Bonaire, Sint Eustatius and Saba | 3 special municipalities |
| BR | Brazil | 1 federal district 26 states |
| BS | Bahamas | 31 districts 1 island |
| BT | Bhutan | 20 districts |
| BV | Bouvet Island | — |
| BW | Botswana | 10 districts 4 towns 2 cities |
| BY | Belarus | 6 oblasts 1 city |
| BZ | Belize | 6 districts |
| CA | Canada | 10 provinces 3 territories |
| CC | Cocos (Keeling) Islands | — |
| CD | Congo, Democratic Republic of the | 1 city 25 provinces |
| CF | Central African Republic | 1 commune 14 prefectures 2 economic prefectures |
| CG | Congo | 12 departments |
| CH | Switzerland | 26 cantons |
| CI | Côte d'Ivoire | 12 districts 2 autonomous districts |
| CK | Cook Islands | — |
| CL | Chile | 16 regions |
| CM | Cameroon | 10 regions |
| CN | China | 4 municipalities 23 provinces 5 autonomous regions 2 special administrative regions |
| CO | Colombia | 1 capital district 32 departments |
| CR | Costa Rica | 7 provinces |
| CU | Cuba | 15 provinces 1 special municipality |
| CV | Cabo Verde | 2 geographical regions 22 municipalities |
| CW | Curaçao | — |
| CX | Christmas Island | — |
| CY | Cyprus | 6 districts |
| CZ | Czechia | 13 regions 1 capital city 76 districts |
| DE | Germany | 16 states |
| DJ | Djibouti | 5 regions 1 city |
| DK | Denmark | 5 regions |
| DM | Dominica | 10 parishes |
| DO | Dominican Republic | 10 regions 1 district 31 provinces |
| DZ | Algeria | 58 provinces |
| EC | Ecuador | 24 provinces |
| EE | Estonia | 15 counties 64 rural municipalities 15 urban municipalities |
| EG | Egypt | 27 governorates |
| EH | Western Sahara | — |
| ER | Eritrea | 6 regions |
| ES | Spain | 17 autonomous communities 2 autonomous cities in North Africa; 50 provinces |
| ET | Ethiopia | 2 administrations 11 regional states |
| FI | Finland | 19 regions |
| FJ | Fiji | 4 divisions 1 dependency 14 provinces |
| FK | Falkland Islands (Malvinas) | — |
| FM | Micronesia, Federated States of | 4 states |
| FO | Faroe Islands | — |
| FR | France | 12 metropolitan regions 5 overseas collectivities 1 overseas collectivity with special status 1 dependency 3 overseas departmental collectivities 1 overseas territory 2 overseas unique territorial collectivities 95 metropolitan departments 3 metropolitan collectivities with special status 1 European collectivity |
| GA | Gabon | 9 provinces |
| GB | United Kingdom of Great Britain and Northern Ireland | 3 countries 1 province 32 council areas 25 two-tier counties 11 districts 80 unitary authorities 36 metropolitan districts 32 London boroughs 1 city corporation |
| GD | Grenada | 6 parishes 1 dependency |
| GE | Georgia | 2 autonomous republics 1 city 9 regions |
| GF | French Guiana | — |
| GG | Guernsey | — |
| GH | Ghana | 16 regions |
| GI | Gibraltar | — |
| GL | Greenland | 5 municipalities |
| GM | Gambia | 1 city 5 divisions |
| GN | Guinea | 7 administrative regions 1 governorate 33 prefectures |
| GP | Guadeloupe | — |
| GQ | Equatorial Guinea | 2 regions 8 provinces |
| GR | Greece | 13 administrative regions 1 self-governed part |
| GS | South Georgia and the South Sandwich Islands | — |
| GT | Guatemala | 22 departments |
| GU | Guam | — |
| GW | Guinea-Bissau | 3 provinces 1 autonomous sector 8 regions |
| GY | Guyana | 10 regions |
| HK | Hong Kong | — |
| HM | Heard Island and McDonald Islands | — |
| HN | Honduras | 18 departments |
| HR | Croatia | 1 city 20 counties |
| HT | Haiti | 10 departments |
| HU | Hungary | 1 capital city 19 counties 23 cities of county right |
| ID | Indonesia | 7 geographical units 36 provinces 1 capital district 1 special region |
| IE | Ireland | 4 provinces 26 counties |
| IL | Israel | 6 districts |
| IM | Isle of Man | — |
| IN | India | 28 states 8 union territories |
| IO | British Indian Ocean Territory | — |
| IQ | Iraq | 1 region 18 governorates |
| IR | Iran, Islamic Republic of | 31 provinces |
| IS | Iceland | 8 regions 64 municipalities |
| IT | Italy | 15 regions 5 autonomous regions 80 provinces 2 autonomous provinces 6 free municipal consortiums 14 metropolitan cities 4 decentralized regional entities |
| JE | Jersey | — |
| JM | Jamaica | 14 parishes |
| JO | Jordan | 12 governorates |
| JP | Japan | 47 prefectures |
| KE | Kenya | 47 counties |
| KG | Kyrgyzstan | 2 cities 7 regions |
| KH | Cambodia | 1 autonomous municipality 24 provinces |
| KI | Kiribati | 3 groups of islands |
| KM | Comoros | 3 islands |
| KN | Saint Kitts and Nevis | 2 states 14 parishes |
| KP | Korea, Democratic People's Republic of | 1 capital city 1 metropolitan city 1 special city 9 provinces |
| KR | Korea, Republic of | 6 metropolitan cities 2 special cities 1 special self-governing city 7 provinces 2 special self-governing provinces |
| KW | Kuwait | 6 governorates |
| KY | Cayman Islands | — |
| KZ | Kazakhstan | 3 cities 17 regions |
| LA | Lao People's Democratic Republic | 1 prefecture 17 provinces |
| LB | Lebanon | 8 governorates |
| LC | Saint Lucia | 10 districts |
| LI | Liechtenstein | 11 communes |
| LK | Sri Lanka | 9 provinces 25 districts |
| LR | Liberia | 15 counties |
| LS | Lesotho | 10 districts |
| LT | Lithuania | 10 counties 9 municipalities 7 city municipalities 44 district municipalities |
| LU | Luxembourg | 12 cantons |
| LV | Latvia | 36 municipalities 7 state cities |
| LY | Libya | 22 popularates |
| MA | Morocco | 12 regions 62 provinces 13 prefectures |
| MC | Monaco | 17 quarters |
| MD | Moldova, Republic of | 1 autonomous territorial unit 3 cities 32 districts 1 territorial unit |
| ME | Montenegro | 25 municipalities |
| MF | Saint Martin (French part) | — |
| MG | Madagascar | 6 provinces |
| MH | Marshall Islands | 2 chains of islands 24 municipalities |
| MK | North Macedonia | 80 municipalities |
| ML | Mali | 1 district 10 regions |
| MM | Myanmar | 7 regions 7 states 1 union territory |
| MN | Mongolia | 1 capital city 21 provinces |
| MO | Macao | — |
| MP | Northern Mariana Islands | — |
| MQ | Martinique | — |
| MR | Mauritania | 15 regions |
| MS | Montserrat | — |
| MT | Malta | 68 local councils |
| MU | Mauritius | 3 dependencies 9 districts |
| MV | Maldives | 19 administrative atolls 2 cities |
| MW | Malawi | 3 regions 28 districts |
| MX | Mexico | 31 states 1 federal entity |
| MY | Malaysia | 3 federal territories 13 states |
| MZ | Mozambique | 1 city 10 provinces |
| NA | Namibia | 14 regions |
| NC | New Caledonia | — |
| NE | Niger | 1 urban community 7 departments |
| NF | Norfolk Island | — |
| NG | Nigeria | 1 capital territory 36 states |
| NI | Nicaragua | 15 departments 2 autonomous regions |
| NL | Netherlands, Kingdom of the | 12 provinces 3 countries 3 special municipalities |
| NO | Norway | 11 counties 2 arctic regions |
| NP | Nepal | 7 provinces |
| NR | Naoero | 14 districts |
| NU | Niue | — |
| NZ | New Zealand | 16 regions 1 special island authority |
| OM | Oman | 11 governorates |
| PA | Panama | 10 provinces 4 indigenous regions |
| PE | Peru | 25 regions 1 municipality |
| PF | French Polynesia | — |
| PG | Papua New Guinea | 1 district 20 provinces 1 autonomous region |
| PH | Philippines | 17 regions 82 provinces |
| PK | Pakistan | 4 provinces 2 autonomous territories 1 federal territory |
| PL | Poland | 16 voivodships |
| PM | Saint Pierre and Miquelon | — |
| PN | Pitcairn | — |
| PR | Puerto Rico | — |
| PS | Palestine, State of | 16 governorates |
| PT | Portugal | 18 districts 2 autonomous regions |
| PW | Palau | 16 states |
| PY | Paraguay | 1 capital 17 departments |
| QA | Qatar | 8 municipalities |
| RE | Réunion | — |
| RO | Romania | 41 departments 1 municipality |
| RS | Serbia | 2 autonomous provinces 1 city 29 districts |
| RU | Russian Federation | 21 republics 9 administrative territories 46 administrative regions 2 autonomous cities 1 autonomous region 4 autonomous districts |
| RW | Rwanda | 1 town council 4 provinces |
| SA | Saudi Arabia | 13 regions |
| SB | Solomon Islands | 1 capital territory 9 provinces |
| SC | Seychelles | 27 districts |
| SD | Sudan | 18 states |
| SE | Sweden | 21 counties |
| SG | Singapore | 5 districts |
| SH | Saint Helena, Ascension and Tristan da Cunha | 3 geographical entities |
| SI | Slovenia | 200 municipalities and 12 urban municipalities |
| SJ | Svalbard and Jan Mayen | — |
| SK | Slovakia | 8 regions |
| SL | Sierra Leone | 1 area 4 provinces |
| SM | San Marino | 9 municipalities |
| SN | Senegal | 14 regions |
| SO | Somalia | 18 regions |
| SR | Suriname | 10 districts |
| SS | South Sudan | 10 states |
| ST | Sao Tome and Principe | 1 autonomous region 6 districts |
| SV | El Salvador | 14 departments |
| SX | Sint Maarten (Dutch part) | — |
| SY | Syrian Arab Republic | 14 provinces |
| SZ | Eswatini | 4 regions |
| TC | Turks and Caicos Islands | — |
| TD | Chad | 23 provinces |
| TF | French Southern Territories | — |
| TG | Togo | 5 regions |
| TH | Thailand | 1 metropolitan administration 1 special administrative city 76 provinces |
| TJ | Tajikistan | 1 autonomous region 2 regions 1 capital territory 1 district under republic administration |
| TK | Tokelau | — |
| TL | Timor-Leste | 12 municipalities 1 special administrative region |
| TM | Turkmenistan | 5 regions 1 city |
| TN | Tunisia | 24 governorates |
| TO | Tonga | 5 divisions |
| TR | Türkiye | 81 provinces |
| TT | Trinidad and Tobago | 9 regions 3 boroughs 2 cities 1 ward |
| TV | Tuvalu | 1 town council 7 island councils |
| TW | Taiwan, Province of China (Note: Taiwan is included as a subdivision of China because of its political status within the United Nations, as, even though it is de facto under the jurisdiction of the Republic of China instead of the People's Republic of China, the United Nations does not recognize the Republic of China and considers Taiwan as part of China. In ISO 3166-1, Taiwan is listed as "Taiwan, Province of China".) | 13 counties 3 cities 6 special municipalities |
| TZ | Tanzania, United Republic of | 31 regions |
| UA | Ukraine | 24 regions 1 republic 2 cities |
| UG | Uganda | 4 geographical regions 134 districts 1 city |
| UM | United States Minor Outlying Islands | 9 islands, groups of islands |
| US | United States of America | 50 states 1 district 6 outlying areas |
| UY | Uruguay | 19 departments |
| UZ | Uzbekistan | 1 city 12 regions 1 republic |
| VA | Holy See | — |
| VC | Saint Vincent and the Grenadines | 6 parishes |
| VE | Venezuela, Bolivarian Republic of | 1 federal dependency 1 federal district 23 states |
| VG | Virgin Islands (British) | — |
| VI | Virgin Islands (U.S.) | — |
| VN | Viet Nam | 58 provinces 5 municipalities |
| VU | Vanuatu | 6 provinces |
| WF | Wallis and Futuna | 3 administrative precincts |
| WS | Samoa | 11 districts |
| YE | Yemen | 1 municipality 21 governorates |
| YT | Mayotte | — |
| ZA | South Africa | 9 provinces |
| ZM | Zambia | 10 provinces |
| ZW | Zimbabwe | 10 provinces |

== Subdivisions included in ISO 3166-1 ==
For the following countries, (Note: Not including dependent territories of Australia, Denmark, New Zealand, or the United Kingdom of Great Britain and Northern Ireland, nor Bouvet Island of Norway.) a number of their subdivisions in ISO 3166-2, most of them dependent territories, are also officially assigned their own country codes in ISO 3166-1:

| Entry | Country name | Subdivisions included in ISO 3166-1 (alpha-2 code) |
|---|---|---|
| CN | China | CN-TW Taiwan (TW); CN-HK Hong Kong (HK); CN-MO Macao (MO) |
| FI | Finland | FI-01 Åland (AX) |
| FR | France | FR-971 Guadeloupe (GP); FR-972 Martinique (MQ); FR-973 French Guiana (GF); FR-974 Réunion (RE); FR-976 Mayotte (YT); FR-BL Saint Barthélemy (BL); FR-MF Saint Martin (MF); FR-NC New Caledonia (NC); FR-PF French Polynesia (PF); FR-PM Saint Pierre and Miquelon (PM); FR-TF French Southern Territories (TF); FR-WF Wallis and Futuna (WF) |
| NL | Netherlands, Kingdom of the | NL-AW Aruba (AW); NL-BQ1 Bonaire (BQ) (Note: Collectively Bonaire, Sint Eustatius and Saba are officially assigned their own country codes in ISO 3166-1.); NL-BQ2 Saba (BQ); NL-BQ3 Sint Eustatius (BQ); NL-CW Curaçao (CW); NL-SX Sint Maarten (SX) |
| NO | Norway | NO-21 Svalbard (SJ) (Note: Collectively Svalbard and Jan Mayen are officially assigned their own country codes in ISO 3166-1.); NO-22 Jan Mayen (SJ) |
| US | United States of America | US-AS American Samoa (AS); US-GU Guam (GU); US-MP Northern Mariana Islands (MP); US-PR Puerto Rico (PR); US-UM United States Minor Outlying Islands (UM); US-VI Virgin Islands, U.S. (VI) |

== Format ==
The format of the ISO 3166-2 codes is different for each country. The codes may be alphabetic, numeric, or alphanumeric, and they may also be of constant or variable length. The following is a table of the ISO 3166-2 codes of each country (those with codes defined), grouped by their format:

| Number of characters (second part) | Alphabetic | Numeric | Alphanumeric |
|---|---|---|---|
| 1 | AR, BO, FJ, GM, KI, KM, LS, MG, SL, ST, TG, TM, VE; First-level subdivisions only: BD, CV, FR, GN, GQ, GR, GW, KN, MH, MW, NZ, UG | AT, GA, IS, NE; First-level subdivisions only: LK, NP | |
| 2 | AE, AM, BI, BJ, BN, BQ, BR, BS, BW, BY, CA, CD, CH, CI, CL, CM, CN, DE, DJ, ER, ET, GE, GH, GL, GT, GY, HN, HT, HU, ID, IN, IQ, JO, KW, LA, LB, LR, LT, LU, LY, MC, MD, MU, NA, NG, NI, OM, PK, QA, SB, SD, SH, SK, SN, SO, SR, SS, SV, SY, SZ, TD, TJ, TL, US, UY, UZ, WS, YE, ZW; First-level subdivisions only: CZ, RS; Second-level subdivisions only: AL, CV, GN, GQ, GW, IT, MW, NP | AD, AG, BB, BG, BH, CU, CY, DK, DM, DO, DZ, EE, FI, GD, HR, IR, JM, JP, KP, KR, LC, LI, ME, MK, MM, MT, MY, NO, NR, PL, PT, RW, SA, SC, SG, SM, TN, TO, TR, TZ, UA, UM, VC, ZM; First-level subdivisions only: AL, BF, IT, MA, PH; Second-level subdivisions only: BA, BD, KN, LK, RS | BT, MV, VN; Second-level subdivisions only: FR, GR |
| 3 | AF, AO, BE, FM, GB, KZ, MX, PE, PG, PS, TT, TV, TW, VU; First-level subdivisions only: BA; Second-level subdivisions only: BF, MA, MH, NZ, PH | KE, PW, SI; Second-level subdivisions only: UG | Second-level subdivisions only: CZ |
| 1 or 2 | CR, EC, ES, IE, IL, KG, RO, SE | KH | PA, TH |
| 1 or 3 | MZ | MN | ML |
| 2 or 3 | AU, AZ, BZ, CF, CO, RU, ZA | | LV, MR, NL |
| 1, 2, or 3 | EG | | CG, PY |

== Changes ==
The ISO 3166/MA updates ISO 3166-2 when necessary. Changes in ISO 3166-2 consist mostly of spelling corrections, addition and deletion of subdivisions, and modification of the administrative structure.

ISO used to announce changes in newsletters which updated the currently valid standard, and releasing new editions which comprise a consolidation of newsletter changes. As of July 2013, changes are published in the online catalogue of ISO only and no newsletters are published anymore. Past newsletters remain available on the ISO website.

| Edition/Newsletter | Date issued | Affected entries |
|---|---|---|
| ISO 3166-2:1998 | 1998-12-20 | First edition of ISO 3166-2 |
| Newsletter I-1 | 2000-06-21 | BY, CA, DO, ER, ES, IT, KR, NG, PL, RO, RU, TR, VN, YU |
| Newsletter I-2 | 2002-05-21 | AE, AL, AO, AZ, BD, BG, BJ, CA, CD, CN, CV, CZ, ES, FR, GB, GE, GN, GT, HR, ID, IN, IR, KZ, LA, MA, MD, MW, NI, PH, TR, UZ, VN |
| Newsletter I-3 | 2002-08-20 | AE, CZ, IN, KZ, MD, MO, PS (new entry), TP (changed to TL), UG |
| Newsletter I-4 | 2002-12-10 | BI, CA, EC, ES, ET, GE, ID, IN, KG, KH, KP, KZ, LA, MD, MU, RO, SI, TJ, TL, TM, TW, UZ, VE, YE |
| Newsletter I-5 | 2003-09-05 | BW, CH, CZ, LY, MY, SN, TN, TZ, UG, VE, YU (changed to CS) |
| Newsletter I-6 | 2004-03-08 | AF, AL, AU, CN, CO, ID, KP, MA, TN, ZA |
| Newsletter I-7 | 2005-09-13 | AF, DJ, ID, RU, SI, VN |
| Newsletter I-8 | 2007-04-17 | AD, AG, BB, BH, CI, CS (deleted, replaced with ME and RS), DM, GB, GD, GG (new entry), IM (new entry), IR, IT, JE (new entry), KN, LI, ME (new entry), MK, NR, PW, RS (new entry), RU, RW, SB, SC, SM, TD, TO, TV, VC |
| Newsletter I-9 | 2007-11-28 | BG, BL (new entry), CZ, FR, GB, GE, LB, MF (new entry), MK, MT, RU, SD, SG, UG, ZA |
| ISO 3166-2:2007 | 2007-12-13 | Second edition of ISO 3166-2 (these changes were not announced in a newsletter); BA, DK, DO, EG, GN, HT, KE, KW, LC, LR, TV, YE, ZA |
| Newsletter II-1 | 2010-02-03 (corrected 2010-02-19) | AL, BO, CZ, ES, FR, GN, GR, GW, ID, IE, IT, KN, KP, LK, MA, MH, NP, RS, UG, VE |
| Newsletter II-2 | 2010-06-30 | AG, AR, BA, BF, BI, BS, BY, CF, CL, CV, EC, EG, GB, GL, HU, IT, KE, KM, LY, MD, MW, NG, NZ, OM, PA, PE, PH, RU, SC, SH, SI, SN, TD, TM, YE |
| Newsletter II-3 | 2011-12-13 (corrected 2011-12-15) | AF, AN (deleted, replaced with BQ, CW and SX), AW, AZ, BD, BE, BG, BQ (new entry), BS, CV, CW (new entry), DJ, DK, ER, FI, FR, GB, GQ, HN, HR, HT, ID, IE, IN, JO, KW, LS, LV, MC, ME, MK, MM, MV, NL, NO, NP, NR, PG, PK, PL, PS, QA, SA, SD, SE, SH, SS (new entry), SX (new entry), TL, TN, TR, VN |
| ISO 3166-2:2013 | 2013-11-19 | Third edition of ISO 3166-2 (changes are published in the online catalogue of ISO only and no newsletters are published anymore) |
| ISO 3166-2:2020 | 2020-08 | Fourth edition of ISO 3166-2 |

== See also ==
- ISO 3166
  - ISO 3166-1
  - ISO 3166-2
  - ISO 3166-3
  - List of ISO 3166 country codes
- List of administrative divisions by country
- Lists of sovereign states and dependent territories
- List of terms for administrative divisions
- Geocode
- Global Administrative Unit Layers
