= ISO 3166-2:VC =

Entry for Saint Vincent and the Grenadines in ISO 3166-2

ISO 3166-2:VC is the entry for Saint Vincent and the Grenadines in ISO 3166-2, part of the ISO 3166 standard published by the International Organization for Standardization (ISO), which defines codes for the names of the principal subdivisions (e.g., provinces or states) of all countries coded in ISO 3166-1.

Currently for Saint Vincent and the Grenadines, ISO 3166-2 codes are defined for six parishes.

Each code consists of two parts separated by a hyphen. The first part is VC, the ISO 3166-1 alpha-2 code of Saint Vincent and the Grenadines. The second part is two digits:

- 01–05: parishes on the island of Saint Vincent
- 06: parish in the northern part of the Grenadines

== Current codes ==
Subdivision names are listed as in the ISO 3166-2 standard published by the ISO 3166 Maintenance Agency (ISO 3166/MA).

Click on the button in the header to sort each column.

Code	Subdivision name (en)
VC-01	Charlotte
VC-06	Grenadines
VC-02	Saint Andrew
VC-03	Saint David
VC-04	Saint George
VC-05	Saint Patrick

== Changes ==
The following changes to the entry have been announced in newsletters by the ISO 3166/MA since the first publication of ISO 3166-2 in 1998:

Newsletter	Date issued	Description of change in newsletter	Code/Subdivision change
Newsletter I-8	2007-04-17	Addition of the administrative subdivisions and of their code elements	Subdivisions added: 6 parishes

== See also ==
- Subdivisions of Saint Vincent and the Grenadines
- FIPS region codes of Saint Vincent and the Grenadines
