= ISO 3166-2:FJ =

Entry for Fiji in ISO 3166-2

ISO 3166-2:FJ is the entry for Fiji in ISO 3166-2, part of the ISO 3166 standard published by the International Organization for Standardization (ISO), which defines codes for the names of the principal subdivisions (e.g., provinces or states) of all countries coded in ISO 3166-1.

Currently for Fiji, ISO 3166-2 codes are defined for four divisions, one dependency and 14 provinces.

Each code consists of two parts, separated by a hyphen. The first part is FJ, the ISO 3166-1 alpha-2 code of Fiji. The second part is a letter for divisions and dependency, and 2 digits for provinces.

== Current codes ==
Subdivision names are listed as in the ISO 3166-2 standard published by the ISO 3166 Maintenance Agency (ISO 3166/MA).

Click on the button in the header to sort each column.

=== Divisions and dependency ===
Code	Subdivision name (en)	Subdivision category
FJ-C	Central	division
FJ-E	Eastern	division
FJ-N	Northern	division
FJ-W	Western	division
FJ-R	Rotuma	dependency

=== Provinces ===
Code	Subdivision name (en)	Parent subdivision
FJ-01	Ba	FJ-W
FJ-02	Bua	FJ-N
FJ-03	Cakaudrove	FJ-N
FJ-04	Kadavu	FJ-E
FJ-05	Lau	FJ-E
FJ-06	Lomaiviti	FJ-E
FJ-07	Macuata	FJ-N
FJ-08	Nadroga and Navosa	FJ-W
FJ-09	Naitasiri	FJ-C
FJ-10	Namosi	FJ-C
FJ-11	Ra	FJ-W
FJ-12	Rewa	FJ-C
FJ-13	Serua	FJ-C
FJ-14	Tailevu	FJ-C

== See also ==
- Subdivisions of Fiji
- FIPS region codes of Fiji
