= ISO 3166-2:BE =

Entry for Belgium in ISO 3166-2

ISO 3166-2:BE is the entry for Belgium in ISO 3166-2, part of the ISO 3166 standard published by the International Organization for Standardization (ISO), which defines codes for the names of the principal subdivisions (e.g. provinces or states) of all countries coded in ISO 3166-1.

Currently for Belgium, ISO 3166-2 codes are defined for two levels of subdivisions:

- three regions
- ten provinces

Each code consists of two parts, separated by a hyphen. The first part is BE, the ISO 3166-1 alpha-2 code of Belgium. The second part is three letters. For the provinces, the first letter indicates the region where the province is in:

- V: Flemish Region (Dutch: Vlaams Gewest)
- W: Wallonia (French: Wallonie)

== Current codes ==
Subdivision names are listed as in the ISO 3166-2 standard published by the ISO 3166 Maintenance Agency (ISO 3166/MA).

ISO 639-1 codes are used to represent subdivision names in the following administrative languages:

- (fr): French
- (nl): Dutch

Click on the button in the header to sort each column.

=== Regions ===
Code	Subdivision name (nl)	Subdivision name (fr)	Subdivision name (en) (Note: For reference only, English name not included in the ISO 3166-2 standard.)
BE-BRU	Brussels Hoofdstedelijk Gewest	Bruxelles-Capitale, Région de	Brussels
BE-VLG	Vlaams Gewest	flamande, Région (Note: For reference only, French name not included in the ISO 3166-2 standard.)	Flanders
BE-WAL	Waals Gewest (Note: For reference only, Dutch name not included in the ISO 3166-2 standard.)	wallonne, Région	Wallonia

=== Provinces ===
Code	Subdivision name	Subdivision name (en)	Region
BE-VAN	Antwerpen (nl)	Antwerp	VLG
BE-WBR	Brabant wallon (fr)	Walloon Brabant	WAL
BE-WHT	Hainaut (fr)	Hainaut	WAL
BE-WLG	Liège (fr)	Liège	WAL
BE-VLI	Limburg (nl)	Limburg	VLG
BE-WLX	Luxembourg (fr)	Luxembourg	WAL
BE-WNA	Namur (fr)	Namur	WAL
BE-VOV	Oost-Vlaanderen (nl)	East Flanders	VLG
BE-VBR	Vlaams-Brabant (nl)	Flemish Brabant	VLG
BE-VWV	West-Vlaanderen (nl)	West Flanders	VLG

== Changes ==
The following changes to the entry have been announced in newsletters by the ISO 3166/MA since the first publication of ISO 3166-2 in 1998. ISO stopped issuing newsletters in 2013.

Newsletter	Date issued	Description of change in newsletter
Newsletter II-3	2011-12-13 (corrected 2011-12-15)	First level prefix addition, change of administrative languages and list source update.

The following changes to the entry are listed on ISO's online catalogue, the Online Browsing Platform:

Effective date of change	Short description of change (en)
2011-12-13	First level prefix addition, change of administrative languages and list source update.
2015-11-27	Addition of the parent subdivisions

== See also ==
- Subdivisions of Belgium
- FIPS region codes of Belgium
- NUTS codes of Belgium
- Neighbouring countries: DE, FR, LU, NL
