= ISO 3166-2:OM =

Entry for Oman in ISO 3166-2

ISO 3166-2:OM is the entry for Oman in ISO 3166-2, part of the ISO 3166 standard published by the International Organization for Standardization (ISO), which defines codes for the names of the principal subdivisions (e.g., provinces or states) of all countries coded in ISO 3166-1.

Currently for Oman, ISO 3166-2 codes are defined for 11 governorates. In 2011, the following subdivision changes took place:

- Al Batinah Region (Al Bāţinah) split into Al Batinah North Governorate and Al Batinah South Governorate.
- Ash Sharqiyah Region (Ash Sharqīyah) split into Ash Sharqiyah North Governorate and Ash Sharqiyah South Governorate.
- Ad Dakhiliyah Region (Ad Dākhilīyah), Ad Dhahirah North Region (Az̧ Z̧āhirah), and Al Wusta Region (Al Wusţá) all became governorates.

Each code consists of two parts, separated by a hyphen. The first part is OM, the ISO 3166-1 alpha-2 code of Oman. The second part is two letters.

== Current codes ==
Subdivision names are listed as in the ISO 3166-2 standard published by the ISO 3166 Maintenance Agency (ISO 3166/MA).

Click on the button in the header to sort each column.

Code	Subdivision name (ar) (BGN/PCGN 1956)	Local variant	Subdivision name (ar) (Note: For reference only, Arabic name in Arabic script not included in the ISO 3166-2 standard.)	Subdivision name (en) (Note: For reference only, English name not included in the ISO 3166-2 standard.)
OM-DA	Ad Dākhilīyah		الداخلية	Interior
OM-BU	Al Buraymī		ٱلْبُرَيْمِي	Buraymi
OM-WU	Al Wusţá		ٱلْوُسْطَى	Central
OM-ZA	Az̧ Z̧āhirah		الظاهرة	Dhahira
OM-BJ	Janūb al Bāţinah		جنوب الباطنة	South Batina
OM-SJ	Janūb ash Sharqīyah		جَنُوب ٱلشَّرْقِيَّة	Southeastern
OM-MA	Masqaţ	Muscat	مسقط	Muscat
OM-MU	Musandam		مُسَنْدَم	Musandam
OM-BS	Shamāl al Bāţinah		شمال الباطنة	North Batina
OM-SS	Shamāl ash Sharqīyah		شَمَال ٱلشَّرْقِيَّة	Northeastern
OM-ZU	Z̧ufār	Dhofar	ظُفَّار	Dhofar

== Changes ==
The following changes to the entry have been announced by the ISO 3166/MA since the first publication of ISO 3166-2 in 1998. ISO stopped issuing newsletters in 2013.

Newsletter	Date issued	Description of change in newsletter	Code/Subdivision change
Newsletter II-2	2010-06-30	Update of the administrative structure and of the list source	Subdivisions added: OM-BU Al Buraymī; Codes: OM-JA Al Janūbīyah → OM-ZU Z̧ufār
Online Browsing; Platform (OBP)	2015-11-27	Change of subdivision category from region to governate for OM-BA, OM-DA, OM-SH, OM-WU, OM-ZA; change of subdivision code from OM-BA to OM-BJ, from OM-SH to OM-SJ; change of spelling of OM-BJ, OM-SJ; addition of governorates OM-BS, OM-SS; addition of local variations of OM-MA, OM-ZU; update List Source	(TBD)

== See also ==
- Subdivisions of Oman
- FIPS region codes of Oman
- Neighbouring countries: AE, SA, YE
