= ISO 3166-2:MO =

Entry for Macao in ISO 3166-2

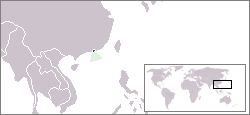
Location of Macau

ISO 3166-2:MO is the entry for Macao (also called Macau in Portuguese) in ISO 3166-2, part of the ISO 3166 standard published by the International Organization for Standardization (ISO), which defines codes for the names of the principal subdivisions (e.g., provinces or states) of all countries coded in ISO 3166-1.

Currently no ISO 3166-2 codes are defined in the entry for Macao.

Macao, a special administrative region of China, is officially assigned the ISO 3166-1 alpha-2 code MO. Moreover, it is also assigned the ISO 3166-2 code CN-MO under the entry for China.

== Changes ==
The following changes to the entry have been announced in newsletters by the ISO 3166/MA since the first publication of ISO 3166-2 in 1998:

Newsletter	Date issued	Description of change in newsletter
Newsletter I-3	2002-05-20	Change of the English country name. In accordance with ISO 3166-1 Newsletter V-4

== See also ==
- Subdivisions of Macau
- FIPS region codes of Macau
- Neighbouring country: CN
