= ISO 3166-2:MC =

Entry for Monaco in ISO 3166-2

ISO 3166-2:MC is the entry for Monaco in ISO 3166-2, part of the ISO 3166 standard published by the International Organization for Standardization (ISO), which defines codes for the names of the principal subdivisions (e.g., provinces or states) of all countries coded in ISO 3166-1.

Currently for Monaco, ISO 3166-2 codes are defined for 17 quarters.

Each code consists of two parts, separated by a hyphen. The first part is MC, the ISO 3166-1 alpha-2 code of Monaco. The second part is two letters.

== Current codes ==
Subdivision names are listed as in the ISO 3166-2 standard published by the ISO 3166 Maintenance Agency (ISO 3166/MA).

Click on the button in the header to sort each column.

Code	Subdivision name (fr)
MC-FO	Fontvieille
MC-JE	Jardin Exotique
MC-CL	La Colle
MC-CO	La Condamine
MC-GA	La Gare
MC-SO	La Source
MC-LA	Larvotto
MC-MA	Malbousquet
MC-MO	Monaco-Ville
MC-MG	Moneghetti
MC-MC	Monte-Carlo
MC-MU	Moulins
MC-PH	Port-Hercule
MC-SR	Saint-Roman
MC-SD	Sainte-Dévote
MC-SP	Spélugues
MC-VR	Vallon de la Rousse

== Changes ==
The following changes to the entry have been announced in newsletters by the ISO 3166/MA since the first publication of ISO 3166-2 in 1998:

Newsletter	Date issued	Description of change in newsletter
Newsletter II-3	2011-12-13 (corrected 2011-12-15)	Administrative subdivisions addition.

== See also ==
- Subdivisions of Monaco
- Neighbouring country: FR
