= Subdivisions of Mozambique =

Territorial subdivision from Mozambique

Mozambique is divided into ten provinces (províncias) and one capital city (cidade capital) with provincial status. The provinces are subdivided into 129 districts (distritos). The districts are further divided in 405 "Postos Administrativos" (Administrative Posts) and then into Localidades (Localities), the lowest geographical level of the central state administration. Since 1998, 65 "Municípios" (Municipalities) have been created in Mozambique.

1. Niassa
2. Cabo Delgado
3. Nampula
4. Tete
5. Zambezia
6. Manica
7. Sofala
8. Gaza
9. Inhambane
10. Maputo (city)
11. Maputo

Map of Mozambique with the province highlighted
