= ISO 3166-2:SX =

Entry for Sint Maarten in ISO 3166-2

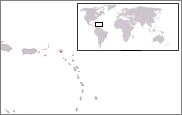
Location map for Saint-Martin.

ISO 3166-2:SX is the entry for Sint Maarten in ISO 3166-2, part of the ISO 3166 standard published by the International Organization for Standardization (ISO), which defines codes for the names of the principal subdivisions (e.g., provinces or states) of all countries coded in ISO 3166-1.

Currently no ISO 3166-2 codes are defined in the entry for Sint Maarten. The country has no defined subdivisions.

Sint Maarten, a constituent country of the Kingdom of the Netherlands, is officially assigned the ISO 3166-1 alpha-2 code SX. Moreover, it is also assigned the ISO 3166-2 code NL-SX under the entry for the Netherlands.

== Changes ==
The following changes to the entry had been announced in newsletters by the ISO 3166/MA since the first publication of ISO 3166-2 in 1998:

Newsletter	Date issued	Description of change in newsletter
Newsletter II-3	2011-12-13 (corrected 2011-12-15)	Addition of code to align ISO 3166-1 and ISO 3166-2

== See also ==
- Neighbouring country: FR (MF)
