= Subdivisions of Lesotho =

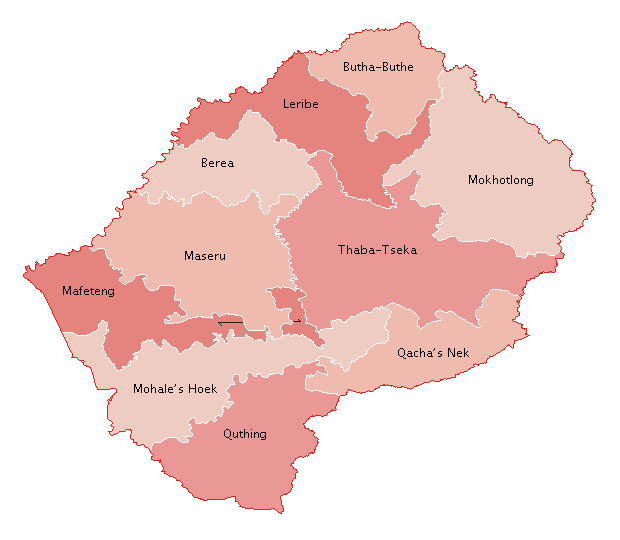
Districts of Lesotho

Administratively, Lesotho is divided into ten districts, each headed by a district administrator. Each district has a capital known as a camptown.

Districts were introduced as the primary subdivision in 1871, with the country divided in four districts. Over time, the number of districts increased. The newest district, Thaba-Tseka, was created in 1980.

The current set of districts are:

- Berea
- Butha-Buthe
- Leribe
- Mafeteng
- Maseru
- Mohale's Hoek
- Mokhotlong
- Qacha's Nek
- Quthing
- Thaba-Tseka

The districts are further subdivided into 80 constituencies, which consists of 129 local community councils.
