= ISO 3166-1 alpha-2 =

Two-letter country codes defined in ISO 3166-1

A map of Europe, with ISO 3166-1 alpha-2 codes in place of the full names of countries and other territories. 'Exceptional reservations' codes, such as EU and UK, are not shown.

ISO 3166-1 alpha-2 codes are two-letter country codes defined in ISO 3166-1, part of the ISO 3166 standard published by the International Organization for Standardization (ISO), to represent countries, dependent territories, and special areas of geographical interest. They are the most widely used of the country codes published by ISO (the others being alpha-3 and numeric), and are used most prominently for the Internet's country code top-level domains (with a few exceptions). They were first included as part of the ISO 3166 standard in its first edition in 1974.

== Uses and applications ==
The ISO 3166-1 alpha-2 codes are used in different environments and are also part of other standards. In some cases they are not perfectly implemented.

=== Perfect implementations ===
The ISO 3166-1 alpha-2 codes are used in the following standards:

Short name	Long name	Comment
ISO 3166-2	Country subdivision code	
ISO 3901	International Standard Recording Code (ISRC)	
ISO 4217	Currency code	
ISO 6166	International Securities Identifying Number (ISIN)	
ISO 9362	Bank Identifier Codes (BIC)	Also known as SWIFT codes
ISO 13616	International Bank Account Number (IBAN)	
ISO 15511	International Standard Identifier for Libraries and Related Organizations (ISIL)	
UN/LOCODE	United Nations Code for Trade and Transport Locations	Implemented by the United Nations Economic Commission for Europe

=== Imperfect implementations ===
Starting in 1985, ISO 3166-1 alpha-2 codes have been used in the Domain Name System as country code top-level domains (ccTLDs). The Internet Assigned Numbers Authority currently assigns the ccTLDs mostly following the alpha-2 codes, but with a few exceptions. For example, the United Kingdom, whose alpha-2 code is GB, uses .uk instead of .gb as its ccTLD, as UK is currently exceptionally reserved in ISO 3166-1 at the request of the United Kingdom.

The WIPO coding standard ST.3 is based on ISO 3166-1 alpha-2 codes, but includes a number of additional codes for international intellectual property organizations, which are currently reserved and not used at the present stage in ISO 3166-1.

The European Commission generally uses ISO 3166-1 alpha-2 codes with two exceptions: EL (not GR) is used to represent Greece, and UK (not GB) is used to represent the United Kingdom. This notwithstanding, the Official Journal of the European Communities specified that GR and GB be used to represent Greece and United Kingdom respectively. For VAT administration purposes, the European Commission uses EL and GB for Greece and the United Kingdom respectively.

The United Nations uses a combination of ISO 3166-1 alpha-2 and alpha-3 codes, along with codes that pre-date the creation of ISO 3166, for international vehicle registration codes, which are codes used to identify the issuing country of a vehicle registration plate; some of these codes are currently indeterminately reserved in ISO 3166-1.

IETF language tags (conforming to the BCP 47 standard track and maintained in an IANA registry) are also partially derived from ISO 3166-1 alpha-2 codes (for the region subtags). The full list of ISO 3166-1 codes assigned to countries and territories are usable as region subtags. Also, the "exceptionally reserved" alpha-2 codes defined in ISO 3166-1 (with the exception of UK) are also usable as region subtags for language tags. However, newer stability policies (agreed with ISO) have been implemented to avoid deleting subtags that have been withdrawn in ISO 3166-1; instead they are kept and aliased to the new preferred subtags, or kept as subtags grouping several countries. Some other region grouping subtags are derived from other standards. Under the newer stability policies, old assigned codes that have been withdrawn from ISO 3166-1 should no longer be reassigned to another country or territory (as has occurred in the past for "CS").

== Current codes ==
=== Decoding table ===
The following is a colour-coded decoding table of all 676 ISO 3166-1 alpha-2 codes.

Decoding table of ISO 3166-1 alpha-2 codes
AA	AB	AC	AD	AE	AF	AG	AH	AI	AJ	AK	AL	AM	AN	AO	AP	AQ	AR	AS	AT	AU	AV	AW	AX	AY	AZ
BA	BB	BC	BD	BE	BF	BG	BH	BI	BJ	BK	BL	BM	BN	BO	BP	BQ	BR	BS	BT	BU	BV	BW	BX	BY	BZ
CA	CB	CC	CD	CE	CF	CG	CH	CI	CJ	CK	CL	CM	CN	CO	CP	CQ	CR	CS	CT	CU	CV	CW	CX	CY	CZ
DA	DB	DC	DD	DE	DF	DG	DH	DI	DJ	DK	DL	DM	DN	DO	DP	DQ	DR	DS	DT	DU	DV	DW	DX	DY	DZ
EA	EB	EC	ED	EE	EF	EG	EH	EI	EJ	EK	EL	EM	EN	EO	EP	EQ	ER	ES	ET	EU	EV	EW	EX	EY	EZ
FA	FB	FC	FD	FE	FF	FG	FH	FI	FJ	FK	FL	FM	FN	FO	FP	FQ	FR	FS	FT	FU	FV	FW	FX	FY	FZ
GA	GB	GC	GD	GE	GF	GG	GH	GI	GJ	GK	GL	GM	GN	GO	GP	GQ	GR	GS	GT	GU	GV	GW	GX	GY	GZ
HA	HB	HC	HD	HE	HF	HG	HH	HI	HJ	HK	HL	HM	HN	HO	HP	HQ	HR	HS	HT	HU	HV	HW	HX	HY	HZ
IA	IB	IC	ID	IE	IF	IG	IH	II	IJ	IK	IL	IM	IN	IO	IP	IQ	IR	IS	IT	IU	IV	IW	IX	IY	IZ
JA	JB	JC	JD	JE	JF	JG	JH	JI	JJ	JK	JL	JM	JN	JO	JP	JQ	JR	JS	JT	JU	JV	JW	JX	JY	JZ
KA	KB	KC	KD	KE	KF	KG	KH	KI	KJ	KK	KL	KM	KN	KO	KP	KQ	KR	KS	KT	KU	KV	KW	KX	KY	KZ
LA	LB	LC	LD	LE	LF	LG	LH	LI	LJ	LK	LL	LM	LN	LO	LP	LQ	LR	LS	LT	LU	LV	LW	LX	LY	LZ
MA	MB	MC	MD	ME	MF	MG	MH	MI	MJ	MK	ML	MM	MN	MO	MP	MQ	MR	MS	MT	MU	MV	MW	MX	MY	MZ
NA	NB	NC	ND	NE	NF	NG	NH	NI	NJ	NK	NL	NM	NN	NO	NP	NQ	NR	NS	NT	NU	NV	NW	NX	NY	NZ
OA	OB	OC	OD	OE	OF	OG	OH	OI	OJ	OK	OL	OM	ON	OO	OP	OQ	OR	OS	OT	OU	OV	OW	OX	OY	OZ
PA	PB	PC	PD	PE	PF	PG	PH	PI	PJ	PK	PL	PM	PN	PO	PP	PQ	PR	PS	PT	PU	PV	PW	PX	PY	PZ
QA	QB	QC	QD	QE	QF	QG	QH	QI	QJ	QK	QL	QM	QN	QO	QP	QQ	QR	QS	QT	QU	QV	QW	QX	QY	QZ
RA	RB	RC	RD	RE	RF	RG	RH	RI	RJ	RK	RL	RM	RN	RO	RP	RQ	RR	RS	RT	RU	RV	RW	RX	RY	RZ
SA	SB	SC	SD	SE	SF	SG	SH	SI	SJ	SK	SL	SM	SN	SO	SP	SQ	SR	SS	ST	SU	SV	SW	SX	SY	SZ
TA	TB	TC	TD	TE	TF	TG	TH	TI	TJ	TK	TL	TM	TN	TO	TP	TQ	TR	TS	TT	TU	TV	TW	TX	TY	TZ
UA	UB	UC	UD	UE	UF	UG	UH	UI	UJ	UK	UL	UM	UN	UO	UP	UQ	UR	US	UT	UU	UV	UW	UX	UY	UZ
VA	VB	VC	VD	VE	VF	VG	VH	VI	VJ	VK	VL	VM	VN	VO	VP	VQ	VR	VS	VT	VU	VV	VW	VX	VY	VZ
WA	WB	WC	WD	WE	WF	WG	WH	WI	WJ	WK	WL	WM	WN	WO	WP	WQ	WR	WS	WT	WU	WV	WW	WX	WY	WZ
XA	XB	XC	XD	XE	XF	XG	XH	XI	XJ	XK	XL	XM	XN	XO	XP	XQ	XR	XS	XT	XU	XV	XW	XX	XY	XZ
YA	YB	YC	YD	YE	YF	YG	YH	YI	YJ	YK	YL	YM	YN	YO	YP	YQ	YR	YS	YT	YU	YV	YW	YX	YY	YZ
ZA	ZB	ZC	ZD	ZE	ZF	ZG	ZH	ZI	ZJ	ZK	ZL	ZM	ZN	ZO	ZP	ZQ	ZR	ZS	ZT	ZU	ZV	ZW	ZX	ZY	ZZ

Colour legend
242	Officially assigned: assigned to a country, territory, or area of geographical interest
7	Officially assigned: formerly either assigned to a different entity or reserved indeterminately, then deleted and later reassigned as above
43	User-assigned: free for assignment at the disposal of users
13	Exceptionally reserved: reserved on request for restricted use
30	Indeterminately reserved: used in coding systems associated with ISO 3166-1
7	Transitionally reserved: deleted from ISO 3166-1 but reserved transitionally
14	Deleted: deleted and free for reassignment
320	Unassigned: free for assignment by the ISO 3166/MA only

=== Officially assigned code elements ===
The following is a complete list of the 249 current officially assigned ISO 3166-1 alpha-2 codes, with the following columns:

- Code: ISO 3166-1 alpha-2 code, pointing to its ISO 3166-2 article
- Country name: English short name officially used by the ISO 3166 Maintenance Agency (ISO 3166/MA)
- Year: Year when alpha-2 code was first officially assigned (1974, first edition of ISO 3166)
- ccTLD: Corresponding country code top-level domain (some are unassigned or inactive); exceptions where another ccTLD is assigned for the country are shown in parentheses
- Notes: Any unofficial notes

Code	Country name (using title case)	Year	ccTLD	Notes
AD	Andorra	1974	.ad	
AE	United Arab Emirates	1974	.ae	
AF	Afghanistan	1974	.af	
AG	Antigua and Barbuda	1974	.ag	
AI	Anguilla	1985	.ai	AI previously represented French Afars and Issas
AL	Albania	1974	.al	
AM	Armenia	1992	.am	
AO	Angola	1974	.ao	
AQ	Antarctica	1974	.aq	Covers the territories south of 60° south latitude Code taken from name in French: Antarctique
AR	Argentina	1974	.ar	
AS	American Samoa	1974	.as	
AT	Austria	1974	.at	
AU	Australia	1974	.au	Includes the Ashmore and Cartier Islands and the Coral Sea Islands
AW	Aruba	1986	.aw	
AX	Åland Islands	2004	.ax	An autonomous county of Finland
AZ	Azerbaijan	1992	.az	
BA	Bosnia and Herzegovina	1992	.ba	
BB	Barbados	1974	.bb	
BD	Bangladesh	1974	.bd	
BE	Belgium	1974	.be	
BF	Burkina Faso	1984	.bf	Name changed from Upper Volta (HV)
BG	Bulgaria	1974	.bg	
BH	Bahrain	1974	.bh	
BI	Burundi	1974	.bi	
BJ	Benin	1977	.bj	Name changed from Dahomey (DY)
BL	Saint Barthélemy	2007	.bl	
BM	Bermuda	1974	.bm	
BN	Brunei Darussalam	1974	.bn	Previous ISO country name: Brunei
BO	Bolivia, Plurinational State of	1974	.bo	Previous ISO country name: Bolivia
BQ	Bonaire, Sint Eustatius and Saba	2010	.bq	Consists of three Caribbean "special municipalities", which are part of the Netherlands proper: Bonaire, Sint Eustatius, and Saba (the BES Islands); Previous ISO country name: Bonaire, Saint Eustatius and Saba; BQ previously represented British Antarctic Territory
BR	Brazil	1974	.br	
BS	Bahamas	1974	.bs	
BT	Bhutan	1974	.bt	
BV	Bouvet Island	1974	.bv	Dependency of Norway
BW	Botswana	1974	.bw	
BY	Belarus	1974	.by	Code taken from previous ISO country name: Byelorussian SSR (now assigned ISO 3166-3 code BYAA); Code assigned as the country was already a UN member since 1945
BZ	Belize	1974	.bz	
CA	Canada	1974	.ca	
CC	Cocos (Keeling) Islands	1974	.cc	External territory of Australia
CD	Congo, Democratic Republic of the	1997	.cd	Name changed from Zaire (ZR)
CF	Central African Republic	1974	.cf	
CG	Congo	1974	.cg	
CH	Switzerland	1974	.ch	Code taken from name in Latin: Confoederatio Helvetica
CI	Côte d'Ivoire	1974	.ci	ISO country name follows UN designation (common name and previous ISO country name: Ivory Coast)
CK	Cook Islands	1974	.ck	
CL	Chile	1974	.cl	
CM	Cameroon	1974	.cm	Previous ISO country name: Cameroon, United Republic of
CN	China	1974	.cn	
CO	Colombia	1974	.co	
CR	Costa Rica	1974	.cr	
CU	Cuba	1974	.cu	
CV	Cabo Verde	1974	.cv	ISO country name follows UN designation (common name and previous ISO country name: Cape Verde, another previous ISO country name: Cape Verde Islands)
CW	Curaçao	2010	.cw	
CX	Christmas Island	1974	.cx	External territory of Australia
CY	Cyprus	1974	.cy	
CZ	Czechia	1993	.cz	Previous ISO country name: Czech Republic
DE	Germany	1974	.de	Code taken from name in German: Deutschland; Code used for West Germany before 1990 (previous ISO country name: Germany, Federal Republic of)
DJ	Djibouti	1977	.dj	Name changed from French Afars and Issas (AI)
DK	Denmark	1974	.dk	
DM	Dominica	1974	.dm	
DO	Dominican Republic	1974	.do	
DZ	Algeria	1974	.dz	Code taken from name in Arabic الجزائر al-Djazā'ir, Algerian Arabic الدزاير al-Dzāyīr, or Berber ⴷⵣⴰⵢⵔ Dzayer
EC	Ecuador	1974	.ec	
EE	Estonia	1992	.ee	Code taken from name in Estonian: Eesti
EG	Egypt	1974	.eg	
EH	Western Sahara	1974	.eh	Previous ISO country name: Spanish Sahara (code taken from name in Spanish: Sahara español)
ER	Eritrea	1993	.er	
ES	Spain	1974	.es	Code taken from name in Spanish: España
ET	Ethiopia	1974	.et	
FI	Finland	1974	.fi	
FJ	Fiji	1974	.fj	
FK	Falkland Islands (Malvinas)	1974	.fk	ISO country name follows UN designation due to the Falkland Islands sovereignty dispute (local common name: Falkland Islands)
FM	Micronesia, Federated States of	1986	.fm	Previous ISO country name: Micronesia
FO	Faroe Islands	1974	.fo	Code taken from name in Faroese: Føroyar
FR	France	1974	.fr	Includes Clipperton Island
GA	Gabon	1974	.ga	
GB	United Kingdom of Great Britain and Northern Ireland	1974	.gb (.uk)	Includes Akrotiri and Dhekelia (Sovereign Base Areas); Code taken from Great Britain (from official name: United Kingdom of Great Britain and Northern Ireland); Previous ISO country name: United Kingdom.uk is the primary ccTLD of the United Kingdom instead of .gb (see code UK, which is exceptionally reserved)
GD	Grenada	1974	.gd	
GE	Georgia	1992	.ge	GE previously represented Gilbert and Ellice Islands
GF	French Guiana	1974	.gf	Code taken from name in French: Guyane française
GG	Guernsey	2006	.gg	A British Crown Dependency
GH	Ghana	1974	.gh	
GI	Gibraltar	1974	.gi	
GL	Greenland	1974	.gl	
GM	Gambia	1974	.gm	
GN	Guinea	1974	.gn	
GP	Guadeloupe	1974	.gp	
GQ	Equatorial Guinea	1974	.gq	Code taken from name in French: Guinée équatoriale
GR	Greece	1974	.gr	
GS	South Georgia and the South Sandwich Islands	1993	.gs	
GT	Guatemala	1974	.gt	
GU	Guam	1974	.gu	
GW	Guinea-Bissau	1974	.gw	
GY	Guyana	1974	.gy	
HK	Hong Kong	1974	.hk	Hong Kong is officially a Special Administrative Region of the People's Republic of China (CN) since 1 July 1997
HM	Heard Island and McDonald Islands	1974	.hm	External territory of Australia
HN	Honduras	1974	.hn	
HR	Croatia	1992	.hr	Code taken from name in Croatian: Hrvatska
HT	Haiti	1974	.ht	
HU	Hungary	1974	.hu	
ID	Indonesia	1974	.id	
IE	Ireland	1974	.ie	
IL	Israel	1974	.il	
IM	Isle of Man	2006	.im	A British Crown Dependency
IN	India	1974	.in	
IO	British Indian Ocean Territory	1974	.io	
IQ	Iraq	1974	.iq	
IR	Iran, Islamic Republic of	1974	.ir	Previous ISO country name: Iran
IS	Iceland	1974	.is	Code taken from name in Icelandic: Ísland
IT	Italy	1974	.it	
JE	Jersey	2006	.je	A British Crown Dependency
JM	Jamaica	1974	.jm	
JO	Jordan	1974	.jo	
JP	Japan	1974	.jp	
KE	Kenya	1974	.ke	
KG	Kyrgyzstan	1992	.kg	
KH	Cambodia	1974	.kh	Code taken from former name: Khmer Republic; Previous ISO country name: Kampuchea, Democratic
KI	Kiribati	1979	.ki	Name changed from Gilbert Islands (GE)
KM	Comoros	1974	.km	Code taken from name in Comorian: Komori; Previous ISO country name: Comoro Islands
KN	Saint Kitts and Nevis	1974	.kn	Previous ISO country name: Saint Kitts-Nevis-Anguilla
KP	Korea, Democratic People's Republic of	1974	.kp	ISO country name follows UN designation (common name: North Korea)
KR	Korea, Republic of	1974	.kr	ISO country name follows UN designation (common name: South Korea)
KW	Kuwait	1974	.kw	
KY	Cayman Islands	1974	.ky	
KZ	Kazakhstan	1992	.kz	Previous ISO country name: Kazakstan
LA	Lao People's Democratic Republic	1974	.la	ISO country name follows UN designation (common name and previous ISO country name: Laos)
LB	Lebanon	1974	.lb	
LC	Saint Lucia	1974	.lc	
LI	Liechtenstein	1974	.li	
LK	Sri Lanka	1974	.lk	
LR	Liberia	1974	.lr	
LS	Lesotho	1974	.ls	
LT	Lithuania	1992	.lt	LT formerly reserved indeterminately for Libya Tripoli
LU	Luxembourg	1974	.lu	
LV	Latvia	1992	.lv	
LY	Libya	1974	.ly	Previous ISO country name: Libyan Arab Jamahiriya
MA	Morocco	1974	.ma	Code taken from name in French: Maroc
MC	Monaco	1974	.mc	
MD	Moldova, Republic of	1992	.md	Previous ISO country name: Moldova (briefly from 2008 to 2009)
ME	Montenegro	2006	.me	ME formerly reserved indeterminately for Western Sahara
MF	Saint Martin (French part)	2007	.mf	The Dutch part of Saint Martin island is assigned code SX
MG	Madagascar	1974	.mg	
MH	Marshall Islands	1986	.mh	
MK	North Macedonia	1993	.mk	Code taken from name in Macedonian: Makedonija; Previous ISO country name: Macedonia, the former Yugoslav Republic of (designated as such due to Macedonia naming dispute)
ML	Mali	1974	.ml	
MM	Myanmar	1989	.mm	Name changed from Burma (BU)
MN	Mongolia	1974	.mn	
MO	Macao	1974	.mo	Previous ISO country name: Macau; Macao is officially a Special Administrative Region of the People's Republic of China since 20 December 1999
MP	Northern Mariana Islands	1986	.mp	
MQ	Martinique	1974	.mq	
MR	Mauritania	1974	.mr	
MS	Montserrat	1974	.ms	
MT	Malta	1974	.mt	
MU	Mauritius	1974	.mu	
MV	Maldives	1974	.mv	
MW	Malawi	1974	.mw	
MX	Mexico	1974	.mx	
MY	Malaysia	1974	.my	
MZ	Mozambique	1974	.mz	
NA	Namibia	1974	.na	
NC	New Caledonia	1974	.nc	
NE	Niger	1974	.ne	
NF	Norfolk Island	1974	.nf	External territory of Australia
NG	Nigeria	1974	.ng	
NI	Nicaragua	1974	.ni	
NL	Netherlands, Kingdom of the	1974	.nl	Officially includes the islands Bonaire, Saint Eustatius and Saba, which also have code BQ in ISO 3166-1. Within ISO 3166-2, Aruba (AW), Curaçao (CW), and Sint Maarten (SX) are also coded as subdivisions of NL. Previous ISO country name: Netherlands
NO	Norway	1974	.no	
NP	Nepal	1974	.np	
NR	Naoero	1974	.nr	Previous ISO country name: Nauru
NU	Niue	1974	.nu	Previous ISO country name: Niue Island
NZ	New Zealand	1974	.nz	
OM	Oman	1974	.om	
PA	Panama	1974	.pa	
PE	Peru	1974	.pe	
PF	French Polynesia	1974	.pf	Code taken from name in French: Polynésie française
PG	Papua New Guinea	1974	.pg	
PH	Philippines	1974	.ph	
PK	Pakistan	1974	.pk	
PL	Poland	1974	.pl	
PM	Saint Pierre and Miquelon	1974	.pm	
PN	Pitcairn	1974	.pn	Previous ISO country name: Pitcairn Islands
PR	Puerto Rico	1974	.pr	
PS	Palestine, State of	1999	.ps	Previous ISO country name: Palestinian Territory, Occupied; Consists of the West Bank and the Gaza Strip
PT	Portugal	1974	.pt	
PW	Palau	1986	.pw	
PY	Paraguay	1974	.py	
QA	Qatar	1974	.qa	
RE	Réunion	1974	.re	
RO	Romania	1974	.ro	
RS	Serbia	2006	.rs	Republic of Serbia
RU	Russian Federation	1992	.ru	ISO country name follows UN designation (common name: Russia); RU formerly reserved indeterminately for Burundi
RW	Rwanda	1974	.rw	
SA	Saudi Arabia	1974	.sa	
SB	Solomon Islands	1974	.sb	Code taken from former name: British Solomon Islands
SC	Seychelles	1974	.sc	
SD	Sudan	1974	.sd	
SE	Sweden	1974	.se	
SG	Singapore	1974	.sg	
SH	Saint Helena, Ascension and Tristan da Cunha	1974	.sh	Previous ISO country name: Saint Helena.
SI	Slovenia	1992	.si	
SJ	Svalbard and Jan Mayen	1974	.sj	Previous ISO name: Svalbard and Jan Mayen Islands; Consists of two Arctic territories of Norway: Svalbard and Jan Mayen
SK	Slovakia	1993	.sk	SK previously represented the Kingdom of Sikkim
SL	Sierra Leone	1974	.sl	
SM	San Marino	1974	.sm	
SN	Senegal	1974	.sn	
SO	Somalia	1974	.so	
SR	Suriname	1974	.sr	Previous ISO country name: Surinam
SS	South Sudan	2011	.ss	
ST	Sao Tome and Principe	1974	.st	
SV	El Salvador	1974	.sv	
SX	Sint Maarten (Dutch part)	2010	.sx	The French part of Saint Martin island is assigned code MF
SY	Syrian Arab Republic	1974	.sy	ISO country name follows UN designation (common name and previous ISO country name: Syria)
SZ	Eswatini	1974	.sz	Previous ISO country name: Swaziland
TC	Turks and Caicos Islands	1974	.tc	
TD	Chad	1974	.td	Code taken from name in French: Tchad
TF	French Southern Territories	1979	.tf	Covers the French Southern and Antarctic Lands except Adélie Land; Code taken from name in French: Terres australes françaises
TG	Togo	1974	.tg	
TH	Thailand	1974	.th	
TJ	Tajikistan	1992	.tj	
TK	Tokelau	1974	.tk	Previous ISO country name: Tokelau Islands
TL	Timor-Leste	2002	.tl	Name changed from East Timor (TP)
TM	Turkmenistan	1992	.tm	
TN	Tunisia	1974	.tn	
TO	Tonga	1974	.to	
TR	Türkiye	1974	.tr	Previous ISO country name: Turkey
TT	Trinidad and Tobago	1974	.tt	
TV	Tuvalu	1977	.tv	
TW	Taiwan, Province of China	1974	.tw	Covers the current jurisdiction of the Republic of China; ISO country name follows UN designation (due to political status of Taiwan within the UN) (common name: Taiwan)
TZ	Tanzania, United Republic of	1974	.tz	
UA	Ukraine	1974	.ua	Previous ISO country name: Ukrainian SSR; Code assigned as the country was already a UN member since 1945
UG	Uganda	1974	.ug	
UM	United States Minor Outlying Islands	1986	.um	Consists of nine minor insular areas of the United States: Baker Island, Howland Island, Jarvis Island, Johnston Atoll, Kingman Reef, Midway Islands, Navassa Island, Palmyra Atoll, and Wake Island.um ccTLD was revoked in 2007 The United States Department of State uses the following user assigned alpha-2 codes for the nine territories, respectively, XB, XH, XQ, XU, XM, QM, XV, XL and QW.
US	United States of America	1974	.us	Previous ISO country name: United States
UY	Uruguay	1974	.uy	
UZ	Uzbekistan	1992	.uz	
VA	Holy See	1974	.va	Covers Vatican City, territory of the Holy See; Previous ISO country names: Vatican City State (Holy See) and Holy See (Vatican City State)
VC	Saint Vincent and the Grenadines	1974	.vc	
VE	Venezuela, Bolivarian Republic of	1974	.ve	Previous ISO country name: Venezuela
VG	Virgin Islands (British)	1974	.vg	
VI	Virgin Islands (U.S.)	1974	.vi	
VN	Viet Nam	1974	.vn	ISO country name follows UN designation (common name: Vietnam); Code used for Republic of Viet Nam (common name: South Vietnam) before 1977
VU	Vanuatu	1980	.vu	Name changed from New Hebrides (NH)
WF	Wallis and Futuna	1974	.wf	Previous ISO country name: Wallis and Futuna Islands
WS	Samoa	1974	.ws	Code taken from former name: Western Samoa
YE	Yemen	1974	.ye	Previous ISO country name: Yemen, Republic of (for three years after the unification); Code used for North Yemen before 1990
YT	Mayotte	1993	.yt	
ZA	South Africa	1974	.za	Code taken from name in Dutch: Zuid-Afrika
ZM	Zambia	1974	.zm	
ZW	Zimbabwe	1980	.zw	Name changed from Southern Rhodesia (RH)

=== User-assigned code elements ===
User-assigned code elements are codes at the disposal of users who need to add further names of countries, territories, or other geographical entities to their in-house application of ISO 3166-1, and the ISO 3166/MA will never use these codes in the updating process of the standard. The following alpha-2 codes can be user-assigned: AA, QM to QZ, XA to XZ, and ZZ. For example:

- The International Standard Recording Code (ISRC) uses QM as a second country code for the United States, as it ran out of three-character registrant codes within the US prefix. It also uses ZZ for some registrants assigned directly.
- The Unicode Common Locale Data Repository (CLDR) assigns QO to represent Outlying Oceania (a multi-territory region containing Antarctica, Bouvet Island, the Cocos (Keeling) Islands, Christmas Island, South Georgia and the South Sandwich Islands, Heard Island and McDonald Islands, the British Indian Ocean Territory, the French Southern Territories, and the United States Minor Outlying Islands), and ZZ to represent "Unknown or Invalid Territory". Before the adoption of the macroregion code EU by ISO, CLDR also used QU to represent the European Union.
- The code QZ is used by the World Intellectual Property Organization (WIPO) as an indicator for the Community Plant Variety Office.
- The code XA is used by Swiss Government as a country code for the Canary Islands, although IC is already reserved for that purpose.
- The codes XA and XO are used by Russian Government to represent Abkhazia and South Ossetia respectively.
- The code XI is used by the UK Government, as an EORI number country code prefix for Northern Ireland, and the members of European Union for European Union value added tax reports with trade with Northern Ireland.
- The code XK is used by the European Commission, the IMF, the SWIFT, the CLDR, and other organizations as a temporary country code for Kosovo.
- The code XN is used by WIPO as an indicator for the Nordic Patent Institute, an international organization common to Denmark, Iceland, Norway and Sweden.
- The code XU is used by WIPO as an indicator for the International Union for the Protection of New Varieties of Plants.
- The code XV is used by WIPO as an indicator for the Visegrad Patent Institute.
- The code XW is used by MusicBrainz as an indicator for worldwide releases.
- The code XX is used by WIPO as an indicator for unknown states, other entities or organizations.
- UN/LOCODE assigns XZ to represent installations in international waters.

The code element OO should be used as an escape code if the number of user-assigned code elements is not sufficient.

=== Reserved code elements ===
Reserved code elements are codes which have become obsolete, or are required in order to enable a particular user application of the standard, but do not qualify for inclusion in ISO 3166-1. To avoid transitional application problems and to aid users who require specific additional code elements for the functioning of their coding systems, the ISO 3166/MA, when justified, reserves these codes which it undertakes not to use for other than specified purposes during a limited or indeterminate period of time.

The reserved alpha-2 codes are divided into the following three categories: exceptional reservations, transitional reservations, and indeterminate reservations.

==== Exceptional reservations ====
Exceptionally reserved code elements are codes reserved at the request of national ISO member bodies, governments and international organizations, which are required in order to support a particular application, as specified by the requesting body and limited to such use; any further use of such code elements is subject to approval by the ISO 3166/MA. The following alpha-2 codes are currently exceptionally reserved:

Code	Area name or country name	Current actual country	ccTLD	Notes
AC	Ascension Island	United Kingdom	.ac	Reserved on request of UPU for stamp issuing area
CP	Clipperton Island	France	—	Reserved on request of ITU for location of certain telecommunications installations
CQ	Island of Sark	United Kingdom	—	Reserved on request of the United Kingdom. Letters are derived from French name Sercq.
DG	Diego Garcia	United Kingdom	—	Reserved on request of ITU for location of certain telecommunications installations
EA	Ceuta, Melilla	Spain	—	Part of Spanish North Africa (Spanish: África Septentrional Española); Reserved on request of WCO for Eurasian Patent Organization (Note: WIPO Standard ST.3 actually uses EA, instead of EV, to represent the Eurasian Patent Organization. However, EA was already exceptionally reserved by the ISO 3166/MA to represent Ceuta and Melilla for customs purposes. The ISO 3166/MA proposed in 1995 that EV be used by WIPO to represent the Eurasian Patent Organization; however, this request was not honoured by WIPO.)
EU	European Union	multiple	.eu	Reserved on request of ISO 4217/MA for the European monetary unit Euro; Extended for ISO 6166 "Securities – International securities identification numbering system (ISIN)" in March 1998; Extended for any application needing to represent the name European Union in August 1999
EZ	Eurozone	multiple	—	Reserved on request of ISO 6166/RA for the European OTC derivatives within International securities identification numbering system (ISIN)
FX	France, Metropolitan	France	—	Reserved on request of France; Officially assigned before deleted from ISO 3166-1 (now assigned ISO 3166-3 code FXFR)
IC	Canary Islands	Spain	—	Reserved on request of WCO for area not covered by European Union Customs arrangements. Code taken from name in Spanish: Islas Canarias
SU	USSR	multiple	.su	Reserved on request of the Foundation for Internet Development from June 2008; Transitionally reserved from September 1992; Officially assigned before deleted from ISO 3166-1 (now assigned ISO 3166-3 code SUHH); Official name and previous ISO country name: Union of Soviet Socialist Republics (common name: Soviet Union)
TA	Tristan da Cunha	United Kingdom	—	Reserved on request of UPU for stamp issuing area
UK	United Kingdom	United Kingdom	.uk	Reserved on request of the United Kingdom lest UK be used for any other country Also used by the European Commission; United Kingdom is officially assigned the alpha-2 code GB
UN	United Nations	multiple	—	Reserved directly by ISO 3166/MA for the United Nations

The following alpha-2 codes were previously exceptionally reserved, but are now officially assigned:

Code	Area name or country name	Notes
AX	Åland Islands	Reserved on request of Finland
GG	Guernsey	Reserved on request of UPU for stamp issuing area
IM	Isle of Man	Reserved on request of UPU for stamp issuing area
JE	Jersey	Reserved on request of UPU for stamp issuing area

==== Transitional reservations ====
Transitional reserved code elements are codes reserved after their deletion from ISO 3166-1. These codes may be used only during a transitional period of at least five years while new code elements that may have replaced them are taken into use. These codes may be reassigned by the ISO 3166/MA after the expiration of the transitional period. The following alpha-2 codes are currently transitionally reserved:

Code	Formerly used country name	Reserved from	Reserved to	ccTLD	ISO 3166-3	Notes
AN	Netherlands Antilles	2010-12	2060-12	.an	ANHH	Divided into BQ (Bonaire, Sint Eustatius and Saba), CW (Curaçao) and SX (Dutch part of Sint Maarten)
BU	Burma	1989-12	2039-12	—	BUMM	Name changed to Myanmar (MM)
CS	Originally Czechoslovakia, later Serbia and Montenegro	2006-09	2056-09	—	CSHH; CSXX	Code taken from name in Serbian: Srbija i Crna Gora, for Serbia and Montenegro, which however is now divided into Montenegro (ME) and Serbia (RS). (Though reserved, the ccTLD .cs was never actually assigned to Serbia and Montenegro; the ccTLD of Serbia and Montenegro was .yu, as that formerly unified country's name, and that of its larger predecessor, had previously been Yugoslavia.); CS originally represented Czechoslovakia. Its successor state Czechia uses CZ, and Slovakia SK.
NT	Neutral Zone	1993-07	2043-07	—	NTHH	Divided between Iraq (IQ) and Saudi Arabia (SA)
TP	East Timor	2002-05	2052-05	.tp	TPTL	Code taken from previous ISO country name: Portuguese Timor, name changed to Timor-Leste (TL)
YU	Yugoslavia	2003-07	2053-07	—	YUCS	Code used for the Socialist Federal Republic of Yugoslavia before 1992 and the Federal Republic of Yugoslavia after 1992
ZR	Zaire	1997-07	2047-07	—	ZRCD	Name changed to Congo, the Democratic Republic of the (CD) ccTLD .zr has been deleted

The following alpha-2 code was previously transitionally reserved, but was later reassigned to another country as its official code:

Code	Formerly used country name	Date of reservation	ccTLD	ISO 3166-3	Notes
CS	Czechoslovakia	1993-06	—	CSHH	Code reassigned to Serbia and Montenegro ccTLD .cs has been deleted

For each deleted alpha-2 code, an entry for the corresponding former country name is included in ISO 3166-3. Each entry is assigned a four-letter alphabetic code, where the first two letters are the deleted alpha-2 code.

==== Indeterminate reservations ====
Indeterminately reserved code elements are reserved for use in a particular way, usually due to their presence in other coding systems. For example, several codes are reserved because they are used for international intellectual property organizations in WIPO Standard ST.3. The following alpha-2 codes are currently indeterminately reserved:

Code elements reserved indeterminately
Code	Area name or country name	Current code	Notes
AP	African Regional Industrial Property Organization (ARIPO)	—	(Note: Reserved at the request of World Intellectual Property Organization (WIPO) for use in Standard ST.3.)
BX	Benelux Trademarks and Designs Office (BOIP)	—	
DY	Benin	BJ	(Note: Code notified to United Nations Secretary-General under 1949 and 1968 Road Traffic Conventions)
EF	Union of Countries under the European Community Patent Convention	—	
EM	European Trademark Office (EUIPO)	—	
EP	European Patent Organization (EPOrg)	—	
EV	Eurasian Patent Organization (EAPO)	—	
EW	Estonia	EE	
FL	Liechtenstein	LI	(Note: Code in use for road transport purposes, but not notified to United Nations Secretary-General under 1949 Road Traffic Convention)
GC	Patent Office of the Cooperation Council for the Arab States of the Gulf (GCCPO)	—	
IB	International Bureau of WIPO	—	
JA	Jamaica	JM	(Note: Code under 1949 Road Traffic Convention)
LF	Libya Fezzan	—	
OA	African Intellectual Property Organization (OAPI)	—	
PI	Philippines	PH	
RA	Argentina	AR	
RB	Bolivia or Botswana	BO or BW	
RC	China	CN & TW	
RH	Haiti	HT	
RI	Indonesia	ID	
RL	Lebanon	LB	
RM	Madagascar	MG	
RN	Niger	NE	(Note: Code under 1968 Road Traffic Convention)
RP	Philippines	PH	
SF	Finland	FI	(Note: Previously used in international postal codes and vehicle registration codes to represent Finland (code was not officially assigned), and the code was previously listed as transitionally reserved from 1995-09 until 2012-06. Code taken from name in Finnish and Swedish combined: Suomi Finland.)
WG	Grenada	GD	
WL	Saint Lucia	LC	
WO	World Intellectual Property Organization (WIPO)	—	
WV	Saint Vincent	VC	
YV	Venezuela	VE	

The following alpha-2 codes were previously indeterminately reserved, but have been reassigned to another country as its official code:

Code elements previously reserved indeterminately
Code	Area name or country name	Current code	Notes	Code reassigned to
LT	Libya Tripoli			Lithuania
ME	Western Sahara	EH		Montenegro
RU	Burundi	BI		Russian Federation

===== Notes =====
1. WIPO Standard ST.3 actually uses EA, instead of EV, to represent the Eurasian Patent Organization. However, EA was already exceptionally reserved by the ISO 3166/MA to represent Ceuta and Melilla for customs purposes. The ISO 3166/MA proposed in 1995 that EV be used by WIPO to represent the Eurasian Patent Organization; however, this request was not honoured by WIPO.
2. Reserved at the request of World Intellectual Property Organization (WIPO) for use in Standard ST.3.
3. Code notified to United Nations Secretary-General under 1949 and 1968 Road Traffic Conventions
4. Code in use for road transport purposes, but not notified to United Nations Secretary-General under 1949 Road Traffic Convention
5. Code under 1949 Road Traffic Convention
6. Code under 1968 Road Traffic Convention
7. Previously used in international postal codes and vehicle registration codes to represent Finland (code was not officially assigned), and the code was previously listed as transitionally reserved from 1995-09 until 2012-06.
  Code taken from name in Finnish and Swedish combined: Suomi Finland.

== Deleted codes ==
Besides the codes currently transitionally reserved and two other codes currently exceptionally reserved (FX for France, Metropolitan and SU for USSR), the following alpha-2 codes have also been deleted from ISO 3166-1:

Code	Formerly used country name	ISO 3166-3	Notes
AI	French Afars and Issas	AIDJ	Code later reassigned to Anguilla
BQ	British Antarctic Territory	BQAQ	Code later reassigned to Bonaire, Sint Eustatius and Saba
CT	Canton and Enderbury Islands	CTKI	
DD	German Democratic Republic	DDDE	Code taken from name in German: Deutsche Demokratische Republik; Common name: East Germany
DY	Dahomey	DYBJ	Name changed to Benin (BJ); The code is now indeterminately reserved.
FQ	French Southern and Antarctic Territories	FQHH	See TF and FR-TF.
GE	Gilbert Islands (initially Gilbert and Ellice Islands)	GEHH	Code later reassigned to Georgia
HV	Upper Volta	HVBF	Code taken from name in French: Haute-Volta
JT	Johnston Island	JTUM	Common name: Johnston Atoll
MI	Midway Islands	MIUM	
NH	New Hebrides	NHVU	
NQ	Dronning Maud Land	NQAQ	A dependent territory of Norway
PC	Pacific Islands (Trust Territory)	PCHH	
PU	United States Miscellaneous Pacific Islands	PUUM	Consisted of Baker Island, Howland Island, Jarvis Island, Kingman Reef, and Palmyra Atoll
PZ	Panama Canal Zone	PZPA	
RH	Southern Rhodesia	RHZW	Name used by country itself: Rhodesia (Southern Rhodesia was the colonial name)
SK	Sikkim	SKIN	Code later reassigned to Slovakia
VD	Viet-Nam, Democratic Republic of	VDVN	Common name: North Vietnam
WK	Wake Island	WKUM	
YD	Yemen, Democratic	YDYE	Common name: South Yemen

For each deleted alpha-2 code, an entry for the corresponding former country name is included in ISO 3166-3. Each entry is assigned a four-letter alphabetic code, where the first two letters are the deleted alpha-2 code.

== See also ==
- List of FIPS country codes in FIPS 10-4, part of the United States’ Federal Information Processing Standards (FIPS)
- The Regional Indicator Symbol in Unicode, introduced to use these codes
- ISO 639-1, a different set of two-letter codes used for languages

== Sources and external links ==
- ISO 3166 Maintenance Agency, International Organization for Standardization (ISO)
  - Online Browsing Platform (OBP) — searchable list of country codes
  - Text file (English, 2016)
  - XML file (English, 2016)
  - Reserved code elements under ISO 3166-1 "Codes for the representation of names of countries and their subdivisions – Part 1: Country codes", available on request from ISO 3166/MA
- The World Factbook (public domain), Central Intelligence Agency
  - Appendix D – Country Data Codes — comparison of FIPS 10, ISO 3166, and STANAG 1059 country codes
- List of all countries with their 2 digit codes (ISO 3166-1) (CSV, JSON)
  - Comprehensive country codes: ISO 3166, ITU, ISO 4217 currency codes and many more (CSV, JSON)
- Administrative Divisions of Countries ("Statoids"), Statoids.com
  - Country codes — comparison of ISO 3166-1 country codes with other country codes
  - ISO 3166-1 Change History
