= WIPO ST.3 =

WIPO ST.3 is the World Intellectual Property Organization standard for the two-letter codes of countries and other organizations, such as regional intellectual-property organizations. It generally follows ISO 3166-1 except for the non-country entries.

== Current codes ==
Rows in blue are not present in ISO 3166-2. Rows in yellow are different from ISO 3166-2. Codes AA, QM to QY, XA to XM, XO to XT, XW, XY, XZ and ZZ are available for individual or provisional use.

English country/organization short name	WIPO ST.3 code	ISO 3166-2 Alpha-2 code
Afghanistan	AF	AF
African Intellectual Property Organization (OAPI)	OA	N/A
African Regional Intellectual Property Organization (ARIPO)	AP	N/A
Albania	AL	AL
Algeria	DZ	DZ
Andorra	AD	AD
Angola	AO	AO
Anguilla	AI	AI
Antigua and Barbuda	AG	AG
Argentina	AR	AR
Armenia	AM	AM
Aruba	AW	AW
Australia	AU	AU
Austria	AT	AT
Azerbaijan	AZ	AZ
Bahamas	BS	BS
Bahrain	BH	BH
Bangladesh	BD	BD
Barbados	BB	BB
Belarus	BY	BY
Belgium	BE	BE
Belize	BZ	BZ
Benelux Office for Intellectual Property (BOIP)	BX	N/A
Benin	BJ	BJ
Bermuda	BM	BM
Bhutan	BT	BT
Bolivia, Plurinational State of	BO	BO
Bonaire, Sint Eustatius and Saba	BQ	BQ
Bosnia and Herzegovina	BA	BA
Botswana	BW	BW
Bouvet Island	BV	BV
Brazil	BR	BR
Brunei Darussalam	BN	BN
Bulgaria	BG	BG
Burkina Faso	BF	BF
Burundi	BI	BI
Cambodia	KH	KH
Cameroon	CM	CM
Canada	CA	CA
Cape Verde	CV	CV
Cayman Islands	KY	KY
Central African Republic	CF	CF
Chad	TD	TD
Chile	CL	CL
China	CN	CN
Community Plant Variety Office of the European Union	QZ	N/A
Colombia	CO	CO
Comoros	KM	KM
Congo	CG	CG
Congo, the Democratic Republic of the	CD	CD
Cook Islands	CK	CK
Costa Rica	CR	CR
Côte d'Ivoire	CI	CI
Croatia	HR	HR
Cuba	CU	CU
Curaçao	CW	CW
Cyprus	CY	CY
Czech Republic	CZ	CZ
Denmark	DK	DK
Djibouti	DJ	DJ
Dominica	DM	DM
Dominican Republic	DO	DO
Ecuador	EC	EC
Egypt	EG	EG
El Salvador	SV	SV
Equatorial Guinea	GQ	GQ
Eritrea	ER	ER
Estonia	EE	EE
Ethiopia	ET	ET
Eurasian Patent Organization (EAPO)	EA	N/A
European Patent Office (EPO)	EP	N/A
Falkland Islands (Malvinas)	FK	FK
Faroe Islands	FO	FO
Fiji	FJ	FJ
Finland	FI	FI
France	FR	FR
Gabon	GA	GA
Gambia	GM	GM
Georgia	GE	GE
Germany	DE	DE
Ghana	GH	GH
Gibraltar	GI	GI
Greece	GR	GR
Greenland	GL	GL
Grenada	GD	GD
Guatemala	GT	GT
Guernsey	GG	GG
Guinea	GN	GN
Guinea-Bissau	GW	GW
Guyana	GY	GY
Haiti	HT	HT
Holy See (Vatican City State)	VA	VA
Honduras	HN	HN
Hong Kong, Special Administrative Region of the People's Republic of China	HK	HK
Hungary	HU	HU
Iceland	IS	IS
India	IN	IN
Indonesia	ID	ID
International Bureau of the World Intellectual Property Organization	IB, WO	N/A
International Union for the Protection of New Varieties of Plants (UPOV)	XU	N/A
Iran, Islamic Republic of	IR	IR
Iraq	IQ	IQ
Ireland	IE	IE
Isle of Man	IM	IM
Israel	IL	IL
Italy	IT	IT
Jamaica	JM	JM
Japan	JP	JP
Jersey	JE	JE
Jordan	JO	JO
Kazakhstan	KZ	KZ
Kenya	KE	KE
Kiribati	KI	KI
Korea, Democratic People's Republic of	KP	KP
Korea, Republic of	KR	KR
Kuwait	KW	KW
Kyrgyzstan	KG	KG
Lao People's Democratic Republic	LA	LA
Latvia	LV	LV
Lebanon	LB	LB
Lesotho	LS	LS
Liberia	LR	LR
Libyan Arab Jamahiriya	LY	LY
Liechtenstein	LI	LI
Lithuania	LT	LT
Luxembourg	LU	LU
Macao	MO	MO
Macedonia, the former Yugoslav Republic of	MK	MK
Madagascar	MG	MG
Malawi	MW	MW
Malaysia	MY	MY
Maldives	MV	MV
Mali	ML	ML
Malta	MT	MT
Mauritania	MR	MR
Mauritius	MU	MU
Mexico	MX	MX
Moldova, Republic of	MD	MD
Monaco	MC	MC
Mongolia	MN	MN
Montenegro	ME	ME
Montserrat	MS	MS
Morocco	MA	MA
Mozambique	MZ	MZ
Myanmar	MM	MM
Namibia	NA	NA
Nauru	NR	NR
Nepal	NP	NP
Netherlands	NL	NL
New Zealand	NZ	NZ
Nicaragua	NI	NI
Niger	NE	NE
Nigeria	NG	NG
Nordic Patent Institute (NPI)	XN	N/A
Northern Mariana Islands	MP	MP
Norway	NO	NO
European Union Intellectual Property Office (EUIPO)	EM	N/A
Oman	OM	OM
Pakistan	PK	PK
Palau	PW	PW
Panama	PA	PA
Papua New Guinea	PG	PG
Paraguay	PY	PY
Patent Office of the Cooperation Council for the Arab States of the Gulf (GCC)	GC	N/A
Peru	PE	PE
Philippines	PH	PH
Poland	PL	PL
Portugal	PT	PT
Qatar	QA	QA
Romania	RO	RO
Russian Federation	RU	RU
Rwanda	RW	RW
Saint Helena, Ascension and Tristan da Cunha	SH	SH
Saint Kitts and Nevis	KN	KN
Saint Lucia	LC	LC
Saint Vincent and the Grenadines	VC	VC
Samoa	WS	WS
San Marino	SM	SM
Sao Tome and Principe	ST	ST
Saudi Arabia	SA	SA
Senegal	SN	SN
Serbia	RS	RS
Seychelles	SC	SC
Sierra Leone	SL	SL
Singapore	SG	SG
Sint Maarten (Dutch part)	SX	SX
Slovakia	SK	SK
Slovenia	SI	SI
Solomon Islands	SB	SB
Somalia	SO	SO
South Africa	ZA	ZA
South Georgia and the South Sandwich Islands	GS	GS
South Sudan	SS	SS
Spain	ES	ES
Sri Lanka	LK	LK
Sudan	SD	SD
Suriname	SR	SR
Swaziland	SZ	SZ
Sweden	SE	SE
Switzerland	CH	CH
Syrian Arab Republic	SY	SY
Taiwan, Province of China	TW	TW
Tajikistan	TJ	TJ
Tanzania, United Republic of	TZ	TZ
Thailand	TH	TH
Timor-Leste	TL	TL
Togo	TG	TG
Tonga	TO	TO
Trinidad and Tobago	TT	TT
Tunisia	TN	TN
Turkey	TR	TR
Turkmenistan	TM	TM
Turks and Caicos Islands	TC	TC
Tuvalu	TV	TV
Uganda	UG	UG
Ukraine	UA	UA
United Arab Emirates	AE	AE
United Kingdom	GB	GB
United States	US	US
Uruguay	UY	UY
Uzbekistan	UZ	UZ
Vanuatu	VU	VU
Venezuela, Bolivarian Republic of	VE	VE
Viet Nam	VN	VN
Virgin Islands, British	VG	VG
Visegrad Patent Institute (VPI)	XV	N/A
Western Sahara	EH	EH
Yemen	YE	YE
Zambia	ZM	ZM
Zimbabwe	ZW	ZW
Unknown states, other entities or organizations	XX	N/A
