= Time in Sudan =

- Time zone: Central Africa Time
- Initials: CAT
- UTC offset: UTC+02:00
- Adopted: 1931–15 January 2000; 1 November 2017 (readopted)

Daylight saving time
- DST not observed

tz database
- Africa/Khartoum

Time in Sudan is given by a single time zone, officially denoted as Central Africa Time (CAT; UTC+02:00). Sudan has observed CAT since 1 November 2017. Sudan has not observed daylight saving time since 14 October 1985.

== History ==
Sudan observed the UTC offset of 2:10:08 as its local mean time until 1931, when it adopted Central Africa Time (UTC+02:00) as standard time. On 15 January 2000, Sudan's time moved forward one hour to East Africa Time (UTC+03:00), causing the territory to deviate from solar time; this change was later reverted on 1 November 2017 when Sudan readopted UTC+02:00.

== Daylight saving time ==
Sudan previously observed daylight saving time between 1970 and 1985, moving the clock forward one hour from UTC+02:00 to UTC+03:00.

== IANA time zone database ==
In the IANA time zone database, Sudan is given one zone in the file zone.tab – Africa/Khartoum. "SD" refers to the country's ISO 3166-1 alpha-2 country code. Data for Sudan directly from zone.tab of the IANA time zone database; columns marked with * are the columns from zone.tab itself:

c.c.*	coordinates*	TZ*	Comments	UTC offset	DST
SD	+1536+03232	Africa/Khartoum		+02:00	+02:00

== See also ==
- Time in South Sudan
- Daylight saving time in Africa
- List of time zones by country
- List of UTC time offsets
