= ISO 3166-2:DJ =

Entry for Djibouti in ISO 3166-2

ISO 3166-2:DJ is the entry for Djibouti in ISO 3166-2, part of the ISO 3166 standard published by the International Organization for Standardization (ISO), which defines codes for the names of the principal subdivisions (e.g., provinces or states) of all countries coded in ISO 3166-1.

Currently for Djibouti, ISO 3166-2 codes are defined for five regions and one city. The city Djibouti is the capital of the country and has special status equal to the regions.

Each code consists of two parts, separated by a hyphen. The first part is DJ, the ISO 3166-1 alpha-2 code of Djibouti. The second part is two letters.

== Current codes ==
Subdivision names are listed as in the ISO 3166-2 standard published by the ISO 3166 Maintenance Agency (ISO 3166/MA).

ISO 639-1 codes are used to represent subdivision names in the following administrative languages:

- (fr): French
- (ar): Arabic

Click on the button in the header to sort each column.

Code	Subdivision name (fr)	Subdivision name (ar) (BGN/PCGN 1956)	Subdivision category
DJ-AS	Ali Sabieh	‘Alī Şabīḩ	region
DJ-AR	Arta	‘Artā	region
DJ-DI	Dikhil	Dikhīl	region
DJ-DJ	Djibouti	Jībūtī	city
DJ-OB	Obock	Awbūk	region
DJ-TA	Tadjourah	Tājūrah	region

== Changes ==
The following changes to the entry have been announced by the ISO 3166/MA since the first publication of ISO 3166-2 in 1998. ISO stopped issuing newsletters in 2013.

Newsletter	Date issued	Description of change in newsletter	Code/Subdivision change
Newsletter I-7	2005-09-13	Change of generic term for administrative divisions. Addition of new region "Arta". New list source and code source	Subdivisions added: DJ-AR Arta
Newsletter II-3	2011-12-13 (corrected 2011-12-15)	Language adjustment and source list update.	
Online Browsing; Platform (OBP)	2014-11-03	Update List Source	
Online Browsing; Platform (OBP)	2015-11-27	Add romanization system for Arabic; typographical correction of DJ-AS; update List Source	
Online Browsing; Platform (OBP)	2016-11-15	Change of spelling of DJ-OB in ara	

== See also ==
- Subdivisions of Djibouti
- FIPS region codes of Djibouti
- Neighbouring countries: ER, ET, SO
