= ISO 3166-2:RW =

Entry for Rwanda in ISO 3166-2

ISO 3166-2:RW is the entry for Rwanda in ISO 3166-2, part of the ISO 3166 standard published by the International Organization for Standardization (ISO), which defines codes for the names of the principal subdivisions (e.g., provinces or states) of all countries coded in ISO 3166-1.

Currently for Rwanda, ISO 3166-2 codes are defined for one city and four provinces. The city Kigali is the capital of the country and has special status equal to the provinces.

Each code consists of two parts separated by a hyphen. The first part is RW, the ISO 3166-1 alpha-2 code of Rwanda. The second part is two digits:

- 01: city
- 02–05: provinces

== Current codes ==
Subdivision names are listed as in the ISO 3166-2 standard published by the ISO 3166 Maintenance Agency (ISO 3166/MA).

Click on the button in the header to sort each column.

Code	Subdivision name (en)	Subdivision name (fr)	Subdivision name (rw)	Subdivision category
RW-01	City of Kigali	Ville de Kigali	Umujyi wa Kigali	city
RW-02	Eastern	Est	Iburasirazuba	province
RW-03	Northern	Nord	Amajyaruguru	province
RW-05	Southern	Sud	Amajyepfo	province
RW-04	Western	Ouest	Iburengerazuba	province

== Changes ==
The following changes to the entry have been announced in newsletters by the ISO 3166/MA since the first publication of ISO 3166-2 in 1998:

Newsletter	Date issued	Description of change in newsletter	Code/Subdivision change
Newsletter I-8	2007-04-17	Modification of the administrative structure	Subdivision layout: 12 prefectures (see below) → 1 town council, 4 provinces

=== Codes before Newsletter I-8 ===
Former code	Subdivision name
RW-C	Butare
RW-v	Byumba
RW-E	Cyangugu
RW-D	Gikongoro
RW-G	Gisenyi
RW-B	Gitarama
RW-J	Kibungo
RW-F	Kibuye
RW-K	Kigali-Rural
RW-L	Kigali-Ville
RW-M	Mutara
RW-H	Ruhengeri

== See also ==
- Subdivisions of Rwanda
- FIPS region codes of Rwanda
- Neighbouring countries: BI, CD, TZ, UG
