= Time in South Sudan =

- Time zone: Central Africa Time
- Initials: CAT
- UTC offset: UTC+02:00
- Adopted: 1 February 2021

Daylight saving time
- DST not observed

tz database
- Africa/Juba

Time in South Sudan is given by a single time zone, officially denoted as Central Africa Time (CAT; UTC+02:00). South Sudan has observed CAT since 1 February 2021. The country does not have an associated daylight saving time.

== History ==
Upon the independence of South Sudan from Sudan on 9 July 2011, it observed East Africa Time (EAT; UTC+03:00). On 1 February 2021, South Sudan moved its time back one hour to the UTC offset +02:00, adopting Central Africa Time.

== IANA time zone database ==
In the IANA time zone database, South Sudan is given one zone in the file zone.tab – Africa/Juba. "SS" refers to the country's ISO 3166-1 alpha-2 country code. Data for South Sudan directly from zone.tab of the IANA time zone database; columns marked with * are the columns from zone.tab itself:

c.c.*	coordinates*	TZ*	Comments	UTC offset	DST
SS	+0451+03137	Africa/Juba		+02:00	+02:00

== See also ==
- Time in Sudan
- List of time zones by country
- List of UTC time offsets
