= ISO 3166-2:CF =

Entry for the Central African Republic in ISO 3166-2

ISO 3166-2:CF is the entry for the Central African Republic in ISO 3166-2, part of the ISO 3166 standard published by the International Organization for Standardization (ISO), which defines codes for the names of the principal subdivisions (e.g., provinces or states) of all countries coded in ISO 3166-1.

Currently for the Central African Republic, ISO 3166-2 codes are defined for one commune, 14 prefectures and two economic prefectures. The commune Bangui is the capital of the country and has special status equal to the prefectures and economic prefectures.

Each code consists of two parts, separated by a hyphen. The first part is CF, the ISO 3166-1 alpha-2 code of the Central African Republic. The second part is either of the following:

- two letters: prefectures and economic prefectures
- three letters: commune

== Current codes ==
Subdivision names are listed as in the ISO 3166-2 standard published by the ISO 3166 Maintenance Agency (ISO 3166/MA).

ISO 639-1 codes are used to represent subdivision names in the following administrative languages:

- (fr): French
- (sg): Sango

Click on the button in the header to sort each column.

Code	Subdivision name (fr)	Subdivision name (sg)	Subdivision category
CF-BB	Bamingui-Bangoran	Bamïngï-Bangoran	prefecture
CF-BGF	Bangui	Bangî	commune
CF-BK	Basse-Kotto	Do-Kötö	prefecture
CF-KB	Gribingui	Gïrïbïngï	economic prefecture
CF-HM	Haut-Mbomou	Tö-Mbömü	prefecture
CF-HK	Haute-Kotto	Tö-Kötö	prefecture
CF-HS	Haute-Sangha / Mambéré-Kadéï	Tö-Sangä / Mbaere-Kadeï	prefecture
CF-KG	Kémo-Gribingui	Kemö-Gïrïbïngï	prefecture
CF-LB	Lobaye	Lobâye	prefecture
CF-MB	Mbomou	Mbömü	prefecture
CF-NM	Nana-Mambéré	Nanä-Mbaere	prefecture
CF-MP	Ombella-Mpoko	Ömbëlä-Pökö	prefecture
CF-UK	Ouaka	Wäkä	prefecture
CF-AC	Ouham	Wâmo	prefecture
CF-OP	Ouham-Pendé	Wâmo-Pendë	prefecture
CF-SE	Sangha	Sangä	economic prefecture
CF-VK	Vakaga	Vakaga	prefecture

== Changes ==
The following changes to the entry have been announced in newsletters by the ISO 3166/MA since the first publication of ISO 3166-2 in 1998:

Newsletter	Date issued	Description of change in newsletter
Newsletter II-2	2010-06-30	Consistency between ISO 3166-1 and ISO 3166-2, addition of names in administrative languages, and update of the administrative structure and of the list source

== See also ==
- Subdivisions of the Central African Republic
- FIPS region codes of the Central African Republic
- Neighbouring countries: CD, CG, CM, SD, SS, TD
