= ISO 3166-2:CG =

Entry for the Republic of the Congo in ISO 3166-2

ISO 3166-2:CG is the entry for the Republic of the Congo (called simply "Congo" in the standard) in ISO 3166-2, part of the ISO 3166 standard published by the International Organization for Standardization (ISO), which defines codes for the names of the principal subdivisions (e.g., provinces or states) of all countries coded in ISO 3166-1.

Currently for the Republic of the Congo, ISO 3166-2 codes are defined for 12 departments. All subdivisions changed their status to departments in 2002.

Each code consists of two parts, separated by a hyphen. The first part is CG, the ISO 3166-1 alpha-2 code of the Republic of the Congo. The second part is either of the following:

- three letters: Brazzaville
- a number: remaining departments

== Current codes ==
Subdivision names are listed as in the ISO 3166-2 standard published by the ISO 3166 Maintenance Agency (ISO 3166/MA).

Click on the button in the header to sort each column.

Code	Subdivision name (fr)	Subdivision name (en)
CG-11	Bouenza	Bouenza
CG-BZV	Brazzaville	Brazzaville
CG-8	Cuvette	Cuvette
CG-15	Cuvette-Ouest	West Cuvette
CG-5	Kouilou	Kouilou
CG-2	Lékoumou	Lekoumou
CG-7	Likouala	Likouala
CG-9	Niari	Niari
CG-14	Plateaux	Plateaux
CG-16	Pointe-Noire	Black Point
CG-12	Pool	Pool
CG-13	Sangha	Sangha

== Changes ==
The following changes to the entry are listed on ISO's online catalogue, the Online Browsing Platform:

Effective date of change	Short description of change (en)
2014-10-29	Change Subdivision category ‘region’ to ‘department’; change ‘capital’ to ‘department’; update List Source
2014-12-18	Alignment of the English short name lower case with UNTERM
2015-02-12	Add 1 department CG-16
2015-02-26	Correction of the OBP entry error as follows: change of the font character from a dash to a hyphen in the name for Pointe-Noire

== See also ==
- Subdivisions of the Republic of the Congo
- FIPS region codes of the Republic of the Congo
- Neighbouring countries: AO, CD, CF, CM, GA
