= ISO 3166-2:GA =

Entry for Gabon in ISO 3166-2

ISO 3166-2:GA is the entry for Gabon in ISO 3166-2, part of the ISO 3166 standard published by the International Organization for Standardization (ISO), which defines codes for the names of the principal subdivisions (e.g., provinces or states) of all countries coded in ISO 3166-1.

Currently for Gabon, ISO 3166-2 codes are defined for nine provinces.

Each code consists of two parts, separated by a hyphen. The first part is GA, the ISO 3166-1 alpha-2 code of Gabon. The second part is a digit (1–9).

== Current codes ==
Subdivision names are listed as in the ISO 3166-2 standard published by the ISO 3166 Maintenance Agency (ISO 3166/MA).

Click on the button in the header to sort each column.

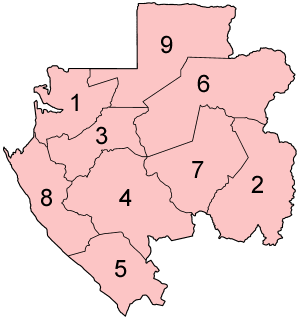
Map of Gabon with each province labelled with the second part of its ISO 3166-2 code.

Code	Subdivision name (fr)	Subdivision name (en) (Note: For reference only, English name not included in the ISO 3166-2 standard.)
GA-1	Estuaire	Estuary
GA-2	Haut-Ogooué	Upper Ogooué
GA-3	Moyen-Ogooué	Middle Ogooué
GA-4	Ngounié	Ngounié
GA-5	Nyanga	Nyanga
GA-6	Ogooué-Ivindo	Ogooué-Ivindo
GA-7	Ogooué-Lolo	Ogooué-Lolo
GA-8	Ogooué-Maritime	Maritime Ogooué
GA-9	Woleu-Ntem	Woleu-Ntem

== See also ==
- Subdivisions of Gabon
- FIPS region codes of Gabon
- Neighbouring countries: CG, CM, GQ
