= ISO 3166-2:CD =

Entry for the Democratic Republic of the Congo in ISO 3166-2

ISO 3166-2:CD is the entry for the Democratic Republic of the Congo in ISO 3166-2, part of the ISO 3166 standard published by the International Organization for Standardization (ISO), which defines codes for the names of the principal subdivisions (e.g., provinces or states) of all countries coded in ISO 3166-1.

Currently for the Democratic Republic of the Congo, ISO 3166-2 codes are defined for one city and 25 provinces. The city Kinshasa is the capital of the country and has special status equal to the provinces. Each code consists of two parts, separated by a hyphen. The first part is CD, the ISO 3166-1 alpha-2 code of the Democratic Republic of the Congo. The second part is two letters.

== Current codes ==
Subdivision names are listed as in the ISO 3166-2 standard published by the ISO 3166 Maintenance Agency (ISO 3166/MA).

Click on the button in the header to sort each column.

Code	Subdivision name (fr)	Subdivision name (en) (Note: For reference only, English name not included in the ISO 3166-2 standard.)	Subdivision category
CD-BU	Bas-Uélé	Lower Uele	province
CD-EQ	Équateur	Equator	province
CD-HK	Haut-Katanga	Upper Katanga	province
CD-HL	Haut-Lomami	Upper Lomami	province
CD-HU	Haut-Uélé	Upper Uele	province
CD-IT	Ituri	Ituri	province
CD-KS	Kasaï	Kasai	province
CD-KC	Kasaï Central	Central Kasai	province
CD-KE	Kasaï Oriental	Eastern Kasai	province
CD-KN	Kinshasa	Kinshasa	city
CD-BC	Kongo Central	Central Kongo	province
CD-KG	Kwango	Kwango	province
CD-KL	Kwilu	Kwilu	province
CD-LO	Lomami	Lomami	province
CD-LU	Lualaba	Lualaba	province
CD-MN	Mai-Ndombe	Mai-Ndombe	province
CD-MA	Maniema	Maniema	province
CD-MO	Mongala	Mongala	province
CD-NK	Nord-Kivu	North Kivu	province
CD-NU	Nord-Ubangi	North Ubangi	province
CD-SA	Sankuru	Sankuru	province
CD-SK	Sud-Kivu	South Kivu	province
CD-SU	Sud-Ubangi	South Ubangi	province
CD-TA	Tanganyika	Tanganyika	province
CD-TO	Tshopo	Tshopo	province
CD-TU	Tshuapa	Tshuapa	province

== Changes ==
The following changes to the entry have been announced by the ISO 3166/MA since the first publication of ISO 3166-2 in 1998. ISO stopped issuing newsletters in 2013.

Newsletter	Date issued	Description of change in newsletter	Code/Subdivision change
Newsletter I-2	2002-05-21	One subdivision name changed. Generic name of subdivisions changed. New reference in the list source	Codes: CD-HC Haut-Congo → CD-OR Orientale
Online Browsing; Platform (OBP)	2016-11-15	Change of subdivision name of CD-BC, CD-KE; deletion of provinces CD-BN, CD-KA, CD-KW, CD-OR; addition of provinces CD-BU, CD-HK, CD-HL, CD-HU, CD-IT, CD-KC, CD-KG, CD-KL, CD-KS, CD-LO, CD-LU, CD-MN, CD-MO, CD-NU, CD-SA, CD-SU, CD-TA, CD-TO, CD-TU; update List Source	Names changed: CD-BC, CD-KE; Subdivisions deleted: CD-BN, CD-KA, CD-KW, CD-OR; Subdivisions added: CD-BU, CD-HK, CD-HL, CD-HU, CD-IT, CD-KC, CD-KG, CD-KL, CD-KS, CD-LO, CD-LU, CD-MN, CD-MO, CD-NU, CD-SA, CD-SU, CD-TA, CD-TO, CD-TU

== See also ==
- Subdivisions of the Democratic Republic of the Congo
- FIPS region codes of the Democratic Republic of the Congo
- Neighbouring countries: AO, BI, CF, CG, RW, SS, TZ, UG, ZM
