= ISO 3166-2:SO =

Entry for Somalia in ISO 3166-2

ISO 3166-2:SO is the entry for Somalia in ISO 3166-2, part of the ISO 3166 standard published by the International Organization for Standardization (ISO), which defines codes for the names of the principal subdivisions (e.g., provinces or states) of all countries coded in ISO 3166-1.

ISO 3166-2 codes have been assigned to Somalia's 18 administrative regions. Each code consists of two parts, separated by a hyphen. The first part is SO, the ISO 3166-1 alpha-2 code of Somalia. The second part is two letters.

== Current codes ==
Subdivision names are listed as in the ISO 3166-2 standard published by the ISO 3166 Maintenance Agency (ISO 3166/MA).

Click on the button in the header to sort each column.

Code	Subdivision name (so)	Subdivision name (ar) (Note: For reference only, Arabic name not included in the ISO 3166-2 standard.)	Subdivision name (en) (Note: For reference only, English name not included in the ISO 3166-2 standard.)
SO-AW	Awdal	أودَل	Awdal
SO-BK	Bakool	بكول	Bakool
SO-BN	Banaadir	بنادر	Banaadir
SO-BR	Bari	بري	Bari
SO-BY	Bay	باي	Bay
SO-GA	Galguduud	جلجدود	Galguduud
SO-GE	Gedo	جيذو	Gedo
SO-HI	Hiiraan	هيران	Hiiraan
SO-JD	Jubbada Dhexe	جوبا الأوسط	Middle Juba
SO-JH	Jubbada Hoose	جوبا السفلى	Lower Juba
SO-MU	Mudug	مدق	Mudug
SO-NU	Nugaal	ونوجال	Nugaal
SO-SA	Sanaag	سَنَاج	Sanaag
SO-SD	Shabeellaha Dhexe	شبيلي الوسطى	Middle Shabelle
SO-SH	Shabeellaha Hoose	شبيلي السفلى	Lower Shabelle
SO-SO	Sool	صول	Sool
SO-TO	Togdheer	تُوْجْدَيْر	Togdheer
SO-WO	Woqooyi Galbeed	شمال غرب	Northwest

== See also ==
- Subdivisions of Somalia
- FIPS region codes of Somalia
- Neighbouring countries: DJ, ET, KE
