= ISO 3166-2:BI =

Entry for Burundi in ISO 3166-2

ISO 3166-2:BI is the entry for Burundi in ISO 3166-2, part of the ISO 3166 standard published by the International Organization for Standardization (ISO), which defines codes for the names of the principal subdivisions (e.g., provinces or states) of all countries coded in ISO 3166-1.

Currently for Burundi, ISO 3166-2 codes are defined for 18 provinces.

Each code consists of two parts, separated by a hyphen. The first part is BI, the ISO 3166-1 alpha-2 code of Burundi. The second part is two letters.

== Current codes ==
Subdivision names are listed as in the ISO 3166-2 standard published by the ISO 3166 Maintenance Agency (ISO 3166/MA).

Click on the button in the header to sort each column.

Code	Subdivision name (rn), (fr)
BI-BB	Bubanza
BI-BM	Bujumbura Mairie
BI-BL	Bujumbura Rural
BI-BR	Bururi
BI-CA	Cankuzo
BI-CI	Cibitoke
BI-GI	Gitega
BI-KR	Karuzi
BI-KY	Kayanza
BI-KI	Kirundo
BI-MA	Makamba
BI-MU	Muramvya
BI-MY	Muyinga
BI-MW	Mwaro
BI-NG	Ngozi
BI-RM	Rumonge
BI-RT	Rutana
BI-RY	Ruyigi

== Changes ==
The following changes to the entry have been announced in newsletters by the ISO 3166/MA since the first publication of ISO 3166-2 in 1998. ISO stopped issuing newsletters in 2013.

Newsletter	Date issued	Description of change in newsletter	Code/Subdivision change
Newsletter I-4	2002-12-10	Addition of one province	Subdivisions added: BI-MW Mwaro
Newsletter II-2	2010-06-30	Update of the administrative structure and of the list source	Subdivisions added: BI-BM Bujumbura Mairie; BI-BL Bujumbura Rural; Subdivisions deleted: BI-BJ Bujumbura

The following changes to the entry are listed on ISO's online catalogue, the Online Browsing Platform:

Effective date of change	Short description of change (en)	Code/Subdivision change
2010-06-30	Update of the administrative structure and of the list source	
2015-11-27	Addition of one province BI-RM; update List Source	Subdivision added: BI-RM Rumonge

== See also ==
- Subdivisions of Burundi
- FIPS region codes of Burundi
- Neighbouring countries: CD, RW, TZ
