= ISO 3166-2:TZ =

Entry for Tanzania in ISO 3166-2

ISO 3166-2:TZ is the entry for Tanzania in ISO 3166-2, part of the ISO 3166 standard published by the International Organization for Standardization (ISO), which defines codes for the names of the principal subdivisions (e.g., provinces or states) of all countries coded in ISO 3166-1.

Currently for Tanzania, ISO 3166-2 codes are defined for 31 regions.

Each code consists of two parts, separated by a hyphen. The first part is TZ, the ISO 3166-1 alpha-2 code of Tanzania. The second part is two digits:

- 01–25: regions as of early 2000s
- 26: region created in 2002
- 27-30: regions created in 2012
- 31: region created in 2016

== Current codes ==
Subdivision names are listed as in the ISO 3166-2 standard published by the ISO 3166 Maintenance Agency (ISO 3166/MA).

ISO 639-1 codes are used to represent subdivision names in the following administrative languages:

- (sw): Swahili
- (en): English

Click on the button in the header to sort each column.

| Code | Subdivision name (sw) | Subdivision name (en) |
|---|---|---|
| TZ-01 | Arusha | |
| TZ-02 | Dar es Salaam | |
| TZ-03 | Dodoma | |
| TZ-27 | Geita | |
| TZ-04 | Iringa | |
| TZ-05 | Kagera | |
| TZ-06 | Kaskazini Pemba | Pemba North |
| TZ-07 | Kaskazini Unguja | Zanzibar North |
| TZ-28 | Katavi | |
| TZ-08 | Kigoma | |
| TZ-09 | Kilimanjaro | |
| TZ-10 | Kusini Pemba | Pemba South |
| TZ-11 | Kusini Unguja | Zanzibar South |
| TZ-12 | Lindi | |
| TZ-26 | Manyara | |
| TZ-13 | Mara | |
| TZ-14 | Mbeya | |
| TZ-15 | Mjini Magharibi | Zanzibar West |
| TZ-16 | Morogoro | |
| TZ-17 | Mtwara | |
| TZ-18 | Mwanza | |
| TZ-29 | Njombe | |
| TZ-19 | Pwani | Coast |
| TZ-20 | Rukwa | |
| TZ-21 | Ruvuma | |
| TZ-22 | Shinyanga | |
| TZ-30 | Simiyu | |
| TZ-23 | Singida | |
| TZ-31 | Songwe | Songwe |
| TZ-24 | Tabora | |
| TZ-25 | Tanga | |

== Changes ==
The following changes to the entry have been announced by the ISO 3166/MA since the first publication of ISO 3166-2 in 1998. ISO stopped issuing newsletters in 2013.

| Newsletter | Date issued | Description of change in newsletter | Code/Subdivision change |
|---|---|---|---|
| Newsletter I-5 | 2003-09-05 | Addition of one new region. One spelling correction. List source updated. Code source updated | Subdivision added: TZ-26 Manyara (sw) |
| Online Browsing; Platform (OBP) | 2014-11-03 | Add 4 regions TZ-27 to TZ-30; update List Source | Subdivisions added: TZ-27 Geita (sw); TZ-28 Katavi (sw); TZ-29 Njombe (sw); TZ-30 Simiyu (sw) |
| Online Browsing; Platform (OBP) | 2018-11-26 | Addition of region TZ-31; Update List Source | Subdivision added: TZ-31 Songwe (sw), Songwe (en) |
| Online Browsing; Platform (OBP) | 2019-02-14 | Modification of the English and French short name lower case | |

== See also ==
- Subdivisions of Tanzania
- FIPS region codes of Tanzania
- Neighbouring countries: BI, CD, KE, MW, MZ, RW, UG, ZM
