= .ss =

Internet country-code top level domain for South Sudan

- Introduced: 10 August 2011 (allocated); 2 February 2019 (root zone)
- TLD type: Country code top-level domain
- Status: Active
- Registry: ssNIC
- Sponsor: Government of South Sudan
- Intended use: Entities connected with South Sudan
- Actual use: Rarely used. When it is used, it is often in South Sudan.
- Registration restrictions: generally none; some SLDs are only for local entities
- Registry website: nic.ss

.ss is the designated country code top-level domain (ccTLD) for South Sudan in the Domain Name System of the Internet. It is derived from the ISO 3166-1 alpha-2 code for South Sudan, which is SS. According to CIO East Africa, the TLD was allocated on 10 August 2011 following the country's declaration of independence from Sudan. The TLD was registered on 31 August 2011, but not added to the DNS root zone and was thus not operational. It was approved at the ICANN Board meeting on 27 January 2019 and was added to the DNS root zone on 2 February 2019.

Before .ss was successfully registered, the country's Undersecretary for Telecommunications had initially been concerned about the ccTLD request's possible rejection due to SS also being an abbreviation for the Schutzstaffel, the paramilitary force of Nazi Germany.

Before the independence of South Sudan, the applicable domain was .sd, Sudan's top-level Internet domain.

Registration of .ss second-level domain names launched in three phases starting 1 June 2020, with general availability starting 1 September 2020. In July 2024 the registry announced registration directly under .ss would open for all applicants on 1 November 2024.

== Structure ==
Registration is possible under the following:

- .ss – open to all applicants (starting from 1 November 2024)
- .com.ss – open to all applicants (intended for commercial entities)
- .biz.ss – any business entity
- .net.ss – for network operators
- .org.ss – for NGOs
- .me.ss – for personal websites (name.me.ss)
- .edu.ss – for South Sudan higher educational institutions
- .sch.ss – for South Sudan secondary and primary schools
- .gov.ss – for South Sudan government entities only
