= ISO 3166-2:CM =

Entry for Cameroon in ISO 3166-2

ISO 3166-2:CM is the entry for Cameroon in ISO 3166-2, part of the ISO 3166 standard published by the International Organization for Standardization (ISO), which defines codes for the names of the principal subdivisions (e.g., provinces or states) of all countries coded in ISO 3166-1.

Currently for Cameroon, ISO 3166-2 codes are defined for ten regions.

Each code consists of two parts, separated by a hyphen. The first part is CM, the ISO 3166-1 alpha-2 code of Cameroon. The second part is two letters.

== Current codes ==
Subdivision names are listed as in the ISO 3166-2 standard published by the ISO 3166 Maintenance Agency (ISO 3166/MA).

ISO 639-1 codes are used to represent subdivision names in the following administrative languages:

- (en): English
- (fr): French

Click on the button in the header to sort each column.

Code	Subdivision name (en)	Subdivision name (fr)
CM-AD	Adamaoua	Adamaoua
CM-CE	Centre	Centre
CM-ES	East	Est
CM-EN	Far North	Extrême-Nord
CM-LT	Littoral	Littoral
CM-NO	North	Nord
CM-NW	North-West	Nord-Ouest
CM-SU	South	Sud
CM-SW	South-West	Sud-Ouest
CM-OU	West	Ouest

== See also ==
- Subdivisions of Cameroon
- FIPS region codes of Cameroon
- Neighbouring countries: CF, CG, GA, GQ, NG, TD
