= ISO 3166-2:KE =

Entry for Kenya in ISO 3166-2

ISO 3166-2:KE is the entry for Kenya in ISO 3166-2, part of the ISO 3166 standard published by the International Organization for Standardization (ISO), which defines codes for the names of the principal subdivisions (e.g., provinces or states) of all countries coded in ISO 3166-1.

Currently for Kenya, ISO 3166-2 codes are defined for 47 counties.

Each code consists of two parts, separated by a hyphen. The first part is KE, the ISO 3166-1 alpha-2 code of Kenya. The second part is two digits.

== Current codes ==
Subdivision names are listed as in the ISO 3166-2 standard published by the ISO 3166 Maintenance Agency (ISO 3166/MA).

ISO 639-1 codes are used to represent subdivision names in the following administrative languages:

- (en): English
- (sw): Swahili

Click on the button in the header to sort each column.

=== Counties ===
Code	Subdivision name (en)
KE-01	Baringo
KE-02	Bomet
KE-03	Bungoma
KE-04	Busia
KE-05	Elgeyo/Marakwet
KE-06	Embu
KE-07	Garissa
KE-08	Homa Bay
KE-09	Isiolo
KE-10	Kajiado
KE-11	Kakamega
KE-12	Kericho
KE-13	Kiambu
KE-14	Kilifi
KE-15	Kirinyaga
KE-16	Kisii
KE-17	Kisumu
KE-18	Kitui
KE-19	Kwale
KE-20	Laikipia
KE-21	Lamu
KE-22	Machakos
KE-23	Makueni
KE-24	Mandera
KE-25	Marsabit
KE-26	Meru
KE-27	Migori
KE-28	Mombasa
KE-29	Murang'a
KE-30	Nairobi City
KE-31	Nakuru
KE-32	Nandi
KE-33	Narok
KE-34	Nyamira
KE-35	Nyandarua
KE-36	Nyeri
KE-37	Samburu
KE-38	Siaya
KE-39	Taita/Taveta
KE-40	Tana River
KE-41	Tharaka-Nithi
KE-42	Trans Nzoia
KE-43	Turkana
KE-44	Uasin Gishu
KE-45	Vihiga
KE-46	Wajir
KE-47	West Pokot

== Changes ==
The following changes to the entry have been announced by the ISO 3166/MA since the first publication of ISO 3166-2 in 1998. ISO stopped issuing newsletters in 2013

Edition/Newsletter	Date issued	Description of change in newsletter	Code/Subdivision change
ISO 3166-2:2007	2007-12-13	Second edition of ISO 3166-2 (this change was not announced in a newsletter)	Codes: Western: KE-900 → KE-800
Newsletter II-2	2010-06-30	Update of the list source	
Online Browsing; Platform (OBP)	2014-10-30	Delete provinces; add 47 counties; update List Source	Deleted codes: KE-110, KE-200, KE-300, KE-400, KE-500, KE-600, KE-700, KE-800; Added codes: KE-01 through KE-47
Online Browsing; Platform (OBP)	2016-11-15	Update Code Source	

=== Former codes ===
Prior to 2014, the ISO 3166-2 standard maintained codes for the former 8 provinces of Kenya.

Click on the button in the header to sort each column.

Former code	Subdivision name (en)	Subdivision name (sw)
KE-110	Nairobi	Nairobi
KE-200	Central	Kati
KE-300	Coast	Pwani
KE-400	Eastern	Mashariki
KE-500	North-Eastern	Kaskazini Mashariki
KE-600	Nyanza	Nyanza
KE-700	Rift Valley	Bonde la Ufa
KE-800	Western	Magharibi

== See also ==
- Subdivisions of Kenya
- FIPS region codes of Kenya
- Neighbouring countries: ET, SO, SS, TZ, UG
