= ISO 3166-2:ER =

Entry for Eritrea in ISO 3166-2

ISO 3166-2:ER is the entry for Eritrea in ISO 3166-2, part of the ISO 3166 standard published by the International Organization for Standardization (ISO), which defines codes for the names of the principal subdivisions (e.g., provinces or states) of all countries coded in ISO 3166-1.

Currently for Eritrea, ISO 3166-2 codes are defined for six regions.

Each code consists of two parts, separated by a hyphen. The first part is ER, the ISO 3166-1 alpha-2 code of Eritrea. The second part is two letters.

== Current codes ==
Subdivision names are listed as in the ISO 3166-2 standard published by the ISO 3166 Maintenance Agency (ISO 3166/MA).

ISO 639-1 codes are used to represent subdivision names in the following administrative languages:

- (ar): Arabic
- (ti): Tigrinya

Click on the button in the header to sort each column.

Code	Subdivision name (ar) (BGN/PCGN 1956)	Subdivision name (ar) (Note: For reference only, Arabic name in Arabic script not included in the ISO 3166-2 standard.)	Subdivision name (ti) (BGN/PCGN 2007)	Subdivision name (ti) (Note: For reference only, Tigrinya name in Tigrinya script not included in the ISO 3166-2 standard.)	Subdivision name (en) (Note: For reference only, English name not included in the ISO 3166-2 standard.)
ER-MA	Al Awsaţ	الأوسط	Ma’ĭkel	ማእከል	Central
ER-DU	Al Janūbī	الجنوبي	Debub	ደቡብ	Southern
ER-AN	Ansabā	أنسابا	‘Anseba	ዓንሰባ	Anseba
ER-DK	Janūbī al Baḩrī al Aḩmar	جنوبي البحري الأحمر	Debubawi K’eyyĭḥ Baḥri	ደቡባዊ ቀይሕ ባሕሪ	Southern Red Sea
ER-GB	Qāsh-Barkah	قش بركاح	Gash-Barka	ጋሽ ባርካ	Gash-Barka
ER-SK	Shimālī al Baḩrī al Aḩmar	الشمالي البهري آل الأحمر	Semienawi K’eyyĭḥ Baḥri	ሰሜናዊ ቀይሕ ባሕሪ	Northern Red Sea

== Changes ==
The following changes to the entry have been announced in newsletters by the ISO 3166/MA since the first publication of ISO 3166-2 in 1998:

Newsletter	Date issued	Description of change in newsletter	Code/Subdivision change
Newsletter I-1	2000-06-21	Introduction of a completely new subdivision layout	Subdivision layout: 10 provinces (see below) → 6 provinces
Newsletter II-3	2011-12-13 (corrected 2011-12-15)	Country name romanization adjustment, language adjustment, alphabetical re-ordering and source list update.	

=== Codes before Newsletter I-1 ===
Former code	Subdivision name
ER-AG	Akele Guzai [Akalä Guzay]
ER-AS	Asmara [Asmära]
ER-BA	Barka
ER-DE	Denkalia [Dänkali]
ER-GS	Gash-Setit [Gaš enna Sätit]
ER-HA	Hamasien [Hamasén]
ER-SA	Sahel
ER-SM	Semhar [Sämhar]
ER-SN	Senhit [Sänhet]
ER-SR	Seraye [Särayé]

== See also ==
- Subdivisions of Eritrea
- FIPS region codes of Eritrea
- Neighbouring countries: DJ, ET, SD
