= ISO 3166-2:ET =

Entry for Ethiopia in ISO 3166-2

ISO 3166-2:ET is the entry for Ethiopia in ISO 3166-2, part of the ISO 3166 standard published by the International Organization for Standardization (ISO), which defines codes for the names of the principal subdivisions (e.g., provinces or states) of all countries coded in ISO 3166-1.

Currently for Ethiopia, ISO 3166-2 codes are defined for two administrations and 11 regional states.

Each code consists of two parts, separated by a hyphen. The first part is ET, the ISO 3166-1 alpha-2 code of Ethiopia. The second part is two letters.

== Current codes ==
Subdivision names are listed as in the ISO 3166-2 standard published by the ISO 3166 Maintenance Agency (ISO 3166/MA).

ISO 639-1 codes are used to represent subdivision names in the following administrative languages:

- (am): Amharic
- (en): English

Click on the button in the header to sort each column.

| Code | Subdivision name (am) (BGN/PCGN 1967) | Subdivision name (am) (Note: For reference only, Amharic name in Amharic script not included in the ISO 3166-2 standard.) | Subdivision name (en) | Subdivision category |
|---|---|---|---|---|
| ET-AA | Ādīs Ābeba | አዲስ አበባ | Addis Ababa | administration |
| ET-AF | Āfar | ዓፋር | Afar | regional state |
| ET-AM | Āmara | አማራ | Amara | regional state |
| ET-BE | Bīnshangul Gumuz | ቤንሻንጉል ጉሙዝ | Benshangul-Gumaz | regional state |
| ET-DD | Dirē Dawa | ድሬዳዋ | Dire Dawa | administration |
| ET-GA | Gambēla Hizboch | ጋምቤላ ሕዝቦች | Gambela Peoples | regional state |
| ET-HA | Hārerī Hizb | ሐረሪ | Harari People | regional state |
| ET-OR | Oromīya | ኦሮሚያ | Oromia | regional state |
| ET-SI | Sīdama | ሲዳማ | Sidama | regional state |
| ET-SO | Sumalē | ሱማሌ | Somali | regional state |
| ET-TI | Tigray | ትግራይ | Tigrai | regional state |
| ET-SN | YeDebub Bihēroch Bihēreseboch na Hizboch | የደቡብ ብሔር ብሔረሰቦችና ሕዝቦች | Southern Nations, Nationalities and Peoples | regional state |
| ET-SW | YeDebub M‘irab Ītyop’iya Hizboch | የደቡብ ምዕራብ ኢትዮጵያ ሕዝቦች | Southwest Ethiopia Peoples | regional state |

== Changes ==
The following changes to the entry have been announced in newsletters by the ISO 3166/MA since the first publication of ISO 3166-2 in 1998:

| Newsletter | Date issued | Description of change in newsletter | Code/Subdivision change |
|---|---|---|---|
| Newsletter I-4 | 2002-12-10 | Change of generic name of one subdivision category to administration. Addition of an administration. Update of list sources | Subdivisions added: ET-DD Dire Dawa |
| Online Browsing; Platform (OBP) | 2014-11-03 | Update List Source | |
| Online Browsing; Platform (OBP) | 2015-11-27 | Deletion of the romanization system for subdivisions in eng; update List Source | |
| Online Browsing; Platform (OBP) | 2019-04-09 | Change of eng subdivision category from state to regional state; Update List Source | Category change: state → regional state |
| Online Browsing; Platform (OBP) | 2021-11-25 | Addition of regional state ET-SI; Update List Source | Subdivisions added: ET-SI Sidama |
| Online Browsing; Platform (OBP) | 2022-11-29 | Addition of regional state ET-SW; Update List Source | Subdivisions added: ET-SW Southwest Ethiopia Peoples |

== See also ==
- Subdivisions of Ethiopia
- FIPS region codes of Ethiopia
- Neighbouring countries: DJ, ER, KE, SD, SO, SS
