= ISO 3166-2:SD =

Entry for Sudan in ISO 3166-2

ISO 3166-2:SD is the entry for Sudan in ISO 3166-2, part of the ISO 3166 standard published by the International Organization for Standardization (ISO), which defines codes for the names of the principal subdivisions (e.g., provinces or states) of all countries coded in ISO 3166-1.

Currently for Sudan, ISO 3166-2 codes are defined for 18 states.

Each code consists of two parts, separated by a hyphen. The first part is SD, the ISO 3166-1 alpha-2 code of Sudan. The second part is two letters.

== Current codes ==
Subdivision names are listed as in the ISO 3166-2 standard published by the ISO 3166 Maintenance Agency (ISO 3166/MA).

ISO 639-1 codes are used to represent subdivision names in the following administrative languages:

- (ar): Arabic
- (en): English

Click on the button in the header to sort each column.

Code	Subdivision name (ar) (BGN/PCGN 1956)	Subdivision name (ar) (Note: For reference only, Arabic name in Arabic script not included in the ISO 3166-2 standard.)	Subdivision name (en)
SD-RS	Al Baḩr al Aḩmar	البحر الأحمر	Red Sea
SD-GZ	Al Jazīrah	الجزيرة	Gezira
SD-KH	Al Kharţūm	الخرطوم	Khartoum
SD-GD	Al Qaḑārif	القضارف	Gedaref
SD-NW	An Nīl al Abyaḑ	النيل الأبيض	White Nile
SD-NB	An Nīl al Azraq	النيل الأزرق	Blue Nile
SD-NO	Ash Shamālīyah	الشمالية	Northern
SD-DW	Gharb Dārfūr	غرب دارفور	West Darfur
SD-GK	Gharb Kurdufān	غرب كردفان	West Kordofan
SD-DS	Janūb Dārfūr	جنوب دارفور	South Darfur
SD-KS	Janūb Kurdufān	جنوب كردفان	South Kordofan
SD-KA	Kassalā	كسلا	Kassala
SD-NR	Nahr an Nīl	نهر النيل	River Nile
SD-DN	Shamāl Dārfūr	شمال دارفور	North Darfur
SD-KN	Shamāl Kurdufān	شمال كردفان	North Kordofan
SD-DE	Sharq Dārfūr	شرق دارفور	East Darfur
SD-SI	Sinnār	سنار	Sennar
SD-DC	Wasaţ Dārfūr (local variant: Zālinjay)	وسط دارفور	Central Darfur (local variant: Zalingei)

== Changes ==
The following changes to the entry have been announced in newsletters by the ISO 3166/MA since the first publication of ISO 3166-2 in 1998:

Newsletter	Date issued	Description of change in newsletter	Code/Subdivision change
Newsletter I-9	2007-11-28	Modification of administrative structure	Subdivisions deleted: SD-10 Gharb Kurdufān
Newsletter II-3	2011-12-13 (corrected 2011-12-15)	Administrative adjustment and update	Subdivision layout: 25 states (see below) → 17 states Subdivisions deleted: 10 states (SD-14 – SD-23) seceded to create South Sudan (SS); Subdivisions added: SD-DE Sharq Dārfūr; SD-DC Zalingei
Online Browsing Platform (OBP)	2015-11-27	Additions of state SD-GK; change spelling of SD-NR, SD-NO, SD-DN, SD-KN, SD-DC; update List Source	Subdivision added: SD-GK Gharb Kurdufān (ar), West Kordofan (en); Spelling changes: SD-DC Zalingei → Wasaţ Dārfūr Zālinjay; SD-DN ? → Shamāl Dārfūr; SD-KN Shamāl Kurdufān → Shiamāl Kurdufān; SD-NO ? → Ash Shamālīyah; SD-NR An Nīl → Nahr an Nīl
Online Browsing Platform (OBP)	2018-11-26	Correction of the romanization system label	
Online Browsing Platform (OBP)	2020-11-24	Typographical correction of subdivision name of SD-KN, SD-DC; Addition of local variation of SD-DC	Spelling changes: SD-DC Wasaţ Dārfūr Zālinjay → Wasaţ Dārfūr; SD-KN Shiamāl Kurdufān → Shamāl Kurdufān

=== Codes before Newsletter II-3 ===
Former code	Subdivision name
SD-23	Āٰālī an Nīl
SD-26	Al Baḩr al Aḩmar
SD-18	Al Buḩayrāt
SD-07	Al Jazīrah
SD-03	Al Kharţūm
SD-06	Al Qaḑārif
SD-22	Al Waḩdah
SD-04	An Nīl
SD-08	An Nīl al Abyaḑ
SD-24	An Nīl al Azraq
SD-01	Ash Shamālīyah
SD-17	Baḩr al Jabal
SD-16	Gharb al Istiwā'īyah
SD-14	Gharb Baḩr al Ghazāl
SD-12	Gharb Dārfūr
SD-11	Janūb Dārfūr
SD-13	Janūb Kurdufān
SD-20	Jūnqalī
SD-05	Kassalā
SD-15	Shamāl Baḩr al Ghazāl
SD-02	Shamāl Dārfūr
SD-09	Shamāl Kurdufān
SD-19	Sharq al Istiwā'īyah
SD-25	Sinnār
SD-21	Wārāb

== See also ==
- Subdivisions of Sudan
- FIPS region codes of Sudan
- Neighbouring countries: CF, EG, ER, ET, LY, SS, TD
