= ISO 3166-2:SS =

Entry for South Sudan in ISO 3166-2

ISO 3166-2:SS is the entry for South Sudan in ISO 3166-2, part of the ISO 3166 standard published by the International Organization for Standardization (ISO), which defines codes for the names of the principal subdivisions (e.g., provinces or states) of all countries coded in ISO 3166-1.

Currently for South Sudan, ISO 3166-2 codes are defined for ten states.

Each code consists of two parts separated by a hyphen. The first part is SS, the ISO 3166-1 alpha-2 code of South Sudan. The second part is two letters.

== Current codes ==
Subdivision names are listed as in the ISO 3166-2 standard published by the ISO 3166 Maintenance Agency (ISO 3166/MA). The administrative areas of Pibor and Ruweng, as well as the currently disputed region of Abyei, do not currently have a corresponding code, and thus are not listed.

Click on the button in the header to sort each column.

Code	Subdivision name (en)
SS-EC	Central Equatoria
SS-EE	Eastern Equatoria
SS-JG	Jonglei
SS-LK	Lakes
SS-BN	Northern Bahr el Ghazal
SS-UY	Unity
SS-NU	Upper Nile
SS-WR	Warrap
SS-BW	Western Bahr el Ghazal
SS-EW	Western Equatoria

== Changes ==
The following changes to the entry have been announced in newsletters by the ISO 3166/MA since the first publication of ISO 3166-2 in 1998. ISO stopped issuing newsletters in 2013.

Newsletter	Date issued	Description of change in newsletter	Code/Subdivision change
Newsletter II-3	2011-12-13 (corrected 2011-12-15)	Administrative subdivisions addition.	Subdivisions added: 10 states

The following changes to the entry are listed on ISO's online catalogue, the Online Browsing Platform:

Effective date of change	Short description of change (en)
2021-11-25	Typographical correction of SS-BW (deletion of the extra space between el and Ghazal)
2014-12-18	Deletion of the space after the short English name lower case
2011-12-13	Addition of code and its administrative subdivisions to align ISO 3166-1 and ISO 3166-2.
2011-08-09	Assign code elements

== See also ==
- Subdivisions of South Sudan
- .ss (corresponding top level domain)
- Neighbouring countries: CD, CF, ET, KE, SD, UG
