= Patent Office of the Republic of Poland =

- Urząd Patentowy Rzeczypospolitej Polskiej
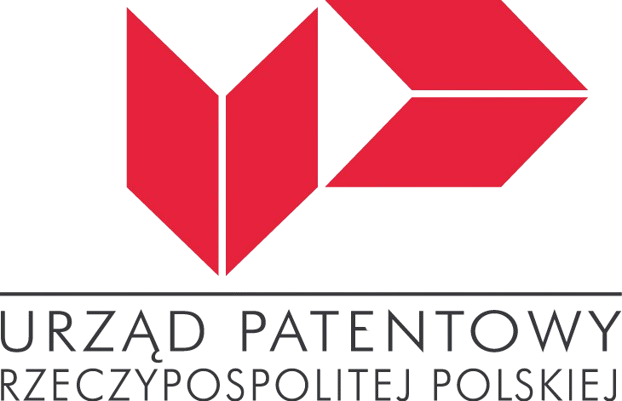
- Logo

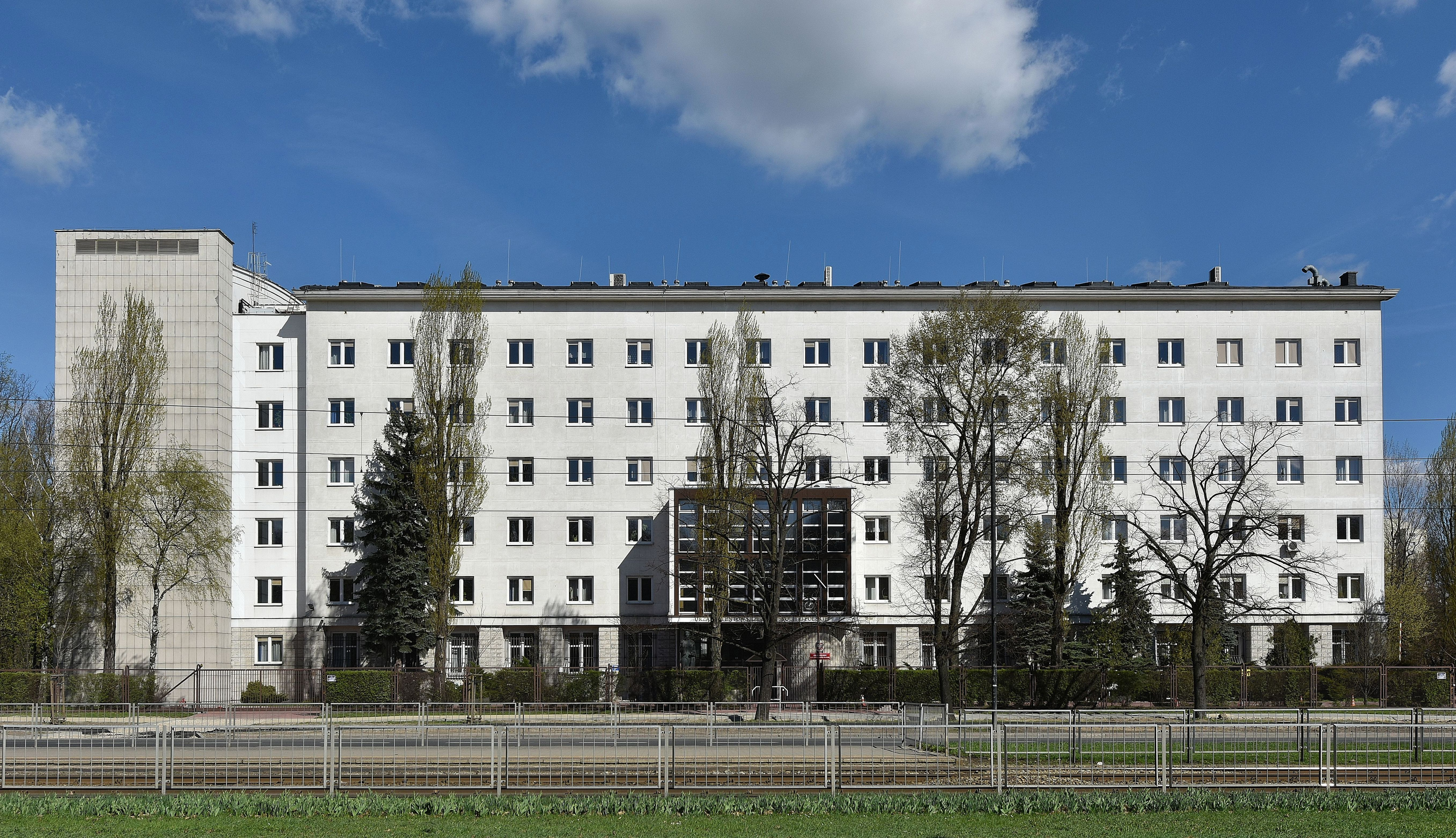
- The office building in 2017

Agency overview
- Formed: 28 December 1918; 106 years ago
- Jurisdiction: Government of Poland
- Status: Active
- Headquarters: al. Niepodległości 188/192 00-925 Warsaw, Poland; 52.2125°N 21.0072°E
- Website: uprp.gov.pl/pl

The Patent Office of the Republic of Poland (Polish: Urząd Patentowy Rzeczypospolitej Polskiej, abbreviated UPRP) is the patent office of Poland. It is based in Warsaw, the capital and largest city of the country. The Office was established on 28 December 1918, shortly after Poland regained independence, and was placed under the authority of the Ministry of Industry and Trade, with national jurisdiction. The Office registered the country's first trademark and granted its first patent in 1924.

== History ==
The Patent Office of the Republic of Poland was established on 28 December 1918, by provisional decree of the Chief of State, Józef Piłsudski. This occurred shortly after Poland regained independence in November 1918, amid efforts to align national regulations with international frameworks such as the Paris Convention for the Protection of Industrial Property, which Poland would accede to in 1919. The Treaty of Versailles, which formally recognised Poland's independence, obliged the country to accede to the Convention. Polish territory remained governed by a mixture of Austrian, German, and Russian legal codes inherited from the partitioning powers following independence. The creation of a national system for industrial property required substantial legislative effort to consolidate and replace these with a unified legal framework. The Patent Office was placed under the authority of the Ministry of Industry and Trade, with national jurisdiction and its seat in Warsaw. On 2 August 1919, it formally adopted the name Urząd Patentowy Rzeczypospolitej Polskiej ('Patent Office of the Republic of Poland'). Its primary functions included the granting of patents for inventions and the issuance of protection certificates for industrial designs and trademarks. The internal structure of the Office comprised a chairman (prezes), legal advisers, assessors (asesorzy), and technical as well as administrative personnel.

The legal framework was further clarified by the Act of 5 February 1924 on the Protection of Inventions, Designs, and Trademarks, which superseded the provisional decree of 1918. Upon its entry into force on 10 April 1924, the Patent Office commenced full operation under statutory authority. In the same year, the Office registered Poland's first trademark, granted its first patent, and formally recognised its first utility model and decorative design. The trademark was Ultramaryna, owned by the dye manufacturer Sommer i Nower. The patent was granted to Maschinenbau-Anstalt Humboldt, a German mechanical engineering firm, for a device for reducing coal dust. The utility model, for a roulette with a rotating disk, was registered to Spitz & Adler, whilst the decorative design was registered to the firm Energja, for an advertising clock.

The 1924 Act established the legal institution of the patent attorney, empowered to represent parties before the Patent Office and entered into an official register maintained by the Office. The first person so registered was the Polish chemist Arnold Bolland. With the expansion of the Office, larger premises became necessary. In 1937 a competition was announced for the design of a new headquarters, won by Rudolf Świerczyński, an architect and professor at the Warsaw Technical University. A bronze statue of Sophia, the personification of wisdom, was placed at the front of the building; it was created by the Polish sculptor Franciszek Strynkiewicz.

== See also ==
- Visegrad Patent Institute – Organisation created by patent offices of four countries
