= ISO 3166-3 =

Code for formerly used names of countries

ISO 3166-3 is part of the ISO 3166 standard published by the International Organization for Standardization (ISO), and defines codes for country names which have been deleted from ISO 3166-1 since its first publication in 1974. The official name of the standard is Codes for the representation of names of countries and their subdivisions – Part 3: Code for formerly used names of countries. It was first published in 1999.

Each former country name in ISO 3166-3 is assigned a four-letter alphabetic code. The first two letters are the ISO 3166-1 alpha-2 code of the former country, while the last two letters are allocated according to the following rules:

- If the country changed its name, the new ISO 3166-1 alpha-2 code is used (e.g., Burma changed its name to Myanmar, whose new alpha-2 code is MM), or the special code AA is used if its alpha-2 code was not changed (e.g., Byelorussian SSR changed its name to Belarus, which has kept the same alpha-2 code).
- If the country merged into an existing country, the ISO 3166-1 alpha-2 code of this country is used (e.g., the German Democratic Republic merged into Germany, whose alpha-2 code is DE).
- If the country was divided into several parts, the special code HH is used to indicate that there is no single successor country (e.g., Czechoslovakia was divided into the Czech Republic and Slovakia), with the exception of Serbia and Montenegro, for which XX is used to avoid duplicate use of the same ISO 3166-3 code, as the alpha-2 code CS had twice been deleted from ISO 3166-1, the first time due to the split of Czechoslovakia and the second time due to the split of Serbia and Montenegro.

Besides the former country name and its ISO 3166-3 code, each entry in ISO 3166-3 also contains its former ISO 3166-1 codes, its period of validity, and the new country names and ISO 3166-1 codes used after its deletion from ISO 3166-1.

After a country is deleted from ISO 3166-1, its alpha-2 and alpha-3 codes will be transitionally reserved for a transitional period of at least fifty years. After the expiration of the transitional period, these codes are free to be reassigned.

If a country changes its name without any territorial change, its ISO 3166-1 numeric code remains the same. For example, when Burma was renamed Myanmar without territorial change in 1989, its alphabetic codes were changed, but its numeric code 104 has remained the same.

Currently, a few ccTLDs using deleted alpha-2 codes are still active or being phased out. However, alpha-2 codes which were deleted before the popularization of the Domain Name System in the late 1980s and early 1990s were never used for the Internet's country code top-level domains (ccTLDs). Likewise, ISO 3166-2, the ISO standard for country subdivision codes which was first published in 1998, postdated the deletion of many alpha-2 codes.

== Current codes ==
The following is a list of current ISO 3166-3 codes, with the following columns:

- Former country name – English short country name officially used by the ISO 3166 Maintenance Agency (ISO 3166/MA)
- Former codes – ISO 3166-1 alpha-2, alpha-3, and numeric codes
- Period of validity – Years when codes were officially assigned
- ISO 3166-3 code – Four-letter code assigned for former country name
- New country names and codes – Successor countries and their ISO 3166-1 codes

Click on the button in the header to sort by ISO 3166-3 code.

Former country name	Former codes	Period of validity	ISO 3166-3 code	New country names and codes
British Antarctic Territory	BQ, ATB, -	1974–1979	BQAQ	Merged into Antarctica (AQ, ATA, 010)
Burma	BU, BUR, 104	1974–1989	BUMM	Name changed to Myanmar (MM, MMR, 104)
Byelorussian SSR	BY, BYS, 112	1974–1992	BYAA	Name changed to Belarus (BY, BLR, 112)
Canton and Enderbury Islands	CT, CTE, 128	1974–1984	CTKI	Merged into Kiribati (KI, KIR, 296)
Czechoslovakia	CS, CSK, 200	1974–1993	CSHH	Divided into: Czechia (CZ, CZE, 203); Slovakia (SK, SVK, 703)
Dahomey	DY, DHY, 204	1974–1977	DYBJ	Name changed to Benin (BJ, BEN, 204)
Dronning Maud Land	NQ, ATN, 216	1974–1983	NQAQ	Merged into Antarctica (AQ, ATA, 010)
East Timor (Note: East Timor was included in ISO 3166-1 under the name of Portuguese Timor from 1974 to 1977.)	TP, TMP, 626	1974–2002	TPTL	Name changed to Timor-Leste (TL, TLS, 626)
France, Metropolitan	FX, FXX, 249	1993–1997	FXFR	Merged into France (FR, FRA, 250)
French Afars and Issas	AI, AFI, 262	1974–1977	AIDJ	Name changed to Djibouti (DJ, DJI, 262)
French Southern and Antarctic Territories	FQ, ATF, -	1974–1979	FQHH	Divided into: Part of Antarctica (AQ, ATA, 010) (i.e., Adélie Land); French Southern Territories (TF, ATF, 260)
German Democratic Republic	DD, DDR, 278	1974–1990	DDDE	Merged into Germany (DE, DEU, 276)
Gilbert Islands (Note: Included in ISO 3166-1 under the name of Gilbert and Ellice Islands before the split of Tuvalu in 1977.)	GE, GEL, -	1974–1979	GEHH	Name changed to Kiribati (KI, KIR, 296)
Johnston Island	JT, JTN, 396	1974–1986	JTUM	Merged into United States Minor Outlying Islands (UM, UMI, 581)
Midway Islands	MI, MID, 488	1974–1986	MIUM	Merged into United States Minor Outlying Islands (UM, UMI, 581)
Netherlands Antilles	AN, ANT, 530 (Note: The ISO 3166-1 numeric code of the Netherlands Antilles was changed from 532 to 530 in 1993 after Aruba had split away in 1986.)	1974–2010 (Note: The period of validity was corrected from 1974–2011 to 1974–2010 with a reissue of ISO 3166-3 Newsletter I-6.)	ANHH	Divided into: Bonaire, Sint Eustatius and Saba (BQ, BES, 535) (Note: The territory name was corrected from "Bonaire, Saint Eustatius and Saba" to "Bonaire, Sint Eustatius and Saba" in ISO 3166-1 Newsletter VI-9.); Curaçao (CW, CUW, 531); Sint Maarten (Dutch part) (SX, SXM, 534)
Neutral Zone	NT, NTZ, 536	1974–1993	NTHH	Divided into: Part of Iraq (IQ, IRQ, 368); Part of Saudi Arabia (SA, SAU, 682)
New Hebrides	NH, NHB, -	1974–1980	NHVU	Name changed to Vanuatu (VU, VUT, 548)
Pacific Islands (Trust Territory)	PC, PCI, 582	1974–1986	PCHH	Divided into: Marshall Islands (MH, MHL, 584); Micronesia (Federated States of) (FM, FSM, 583); Northern Mariana Islands (MP, MNP, 580); Palau (PW, PLW, 585)
Panama Canal Zone	PZ, PCZ, -	1974–1980	PZPA	Merged into Panama (PA, PAN, 591)
Serbia and Montenegro	CS, SCG, 891	2003–2006	CSXX (Note: Initially the ISO 3166-3 code CSHH was assigned to represent Serbia and Montenegro (Newsletter I-4), even though it had already been assigned to represent Czechoslovakia. The ISO 3166/MA later rectified the problem by agreeing to assign the ISO 3166-3 code CSXX to represent Serbia and Montenegro (Newsletter I-5).)	Divided into: Montenegro (ME, MNE, 499); Serbia (RS, SRB, 688)
Sikkim	SK, SKM, -	1974–1975	SKIN	Merged into India (IN, IND, 356)
Southern Rhodesia	RH, RHO, -	1974–1980	RHZW	Name changed to Zimbabwe (ZW, ZWE, 716)
United States Miscellaneous Pacific Islands	PU, PUS, 849	1974–1986	PUUM	Merged into United States Minor Outlying Islands (UM, UMI, 581)
Upper Volta	HV, HVO, 854	1974–1984	HVBF	Name changed to Burkina Faso (BF, BFA, 854)
USSR	SU, SUN, 810	1974–1992	SUHH	Divided into: (Note: Despite being part of the USSR, Belarus (then Byelorussian SSR) and Ukraine (then Ukrainian SSR) already had their own ISO 3166-1 codes due to them being UN members since 1945.): Armenia (AM, ARM, 051); Azerbaijan (AZ, AZE, 031); Estonia (EE, EST, 233); Georgia (GE, GEO, 268); Kazakhstan (KZ, KAZ, 398); Kyrgyzstan (KG, KGZ, 417); Latvia (LV, LVA, 428); Lithuania (LT, LTU, 440); Moldova, Republic of (MD, MDA, 498); Russian Federation (RU, RUS, 643); Tajikistan (TJ, TJK, 762); Turkmenistan (TM, TKM, 795); Uzbekistan (UZ, UZB, 860)
Viet-Nam, Democratic Republic of	VD, VDR, -	1974–1977	VDVN	Merged into Viet Nam (VN, VNM, 704)
Wake Island	WK, WAK, 872	1974–1986	WKUM	Merged into United States Minor Outlying Islands (UM, UMI, 581)
Yemen, Democratic	YD, YMD, 720	1974–1990	YDYE	Merged into Yemen (YE, YEM, 887)
Yugoslavia	YU, YUG, 891 (Note: The ISO 3166-1 numeric code of Yugoslavia was changed from 890 (for the Socialist Federal Republic of Yugoslavia) to 891 (for the Federal Republic of Yugoslavia) in 1993.)	1974–2003	YUCS	Name changed to Serbia and Montenegro (CS, SCG, 891)
Zaire	ZR, ZAR, 180	1974–1997	ZRCD	Name changed to Congo, Democratic Republic of the (CD, COD, 180)

== Changes ==
The ISO 3166/MA updates ISO 3166-3 when necessary. The updating of ISO 3166-3 is totally dependent on the updating of ISO 3166-1.

ISO used to announce changes in newsletters which updated the currently valid standard, and releasing new editions which comprise a consolidation of newsletter changes. As of July 2013, changes are published in the online catalogue of ISO only and no newsletters are published anymore. Past newsletters remain available on the ISO website.

Edition/Newsletter	Date issued	Former country name added	Notes
ISO 3166-3:1999	1999-03-11		First edition of ISO 3166-3
Newsletter I-1	2002-11-15	East Timor	In accordance with ISO 3166-1 Newsletter V-5 and Newsletter V-6
Newsletter I-2	2002-11-22	France, Metropolitan	Correction. Entry inadvertently omitted from ISO 3166-3 when first published in 1999
Newsletter I-3	2003-07-23	Yugoslavia	In accordance with ISO 3166-1 Newsletter V-8
Newsletter I-4	2006-09-26	Serbia and Montenegro	In accordance with ISO 3166-1 Newsletter V-12
Newsletter I-5	2006-12-01	None	Rectify Newsletter I-4 by assigning the code CSXX to represent Serbia and Montenegro
Newsletter I-6	2011-03-14 (corrected 2013-02-06)	Netherlands Antilles	In accordance with ISO 3166-1 Newsletter VI-8
ISO 3166-3:2013	2013-11-19		Second edition of ISO 3166-3 (this is the final print edition of ISO 3166-3; all further changes are published in the online catalogue)
ISO 3166-3:2020	2020-08		Third edition of ISO 3166-3

== See also ==
- International Organization for Standardization
  - ISO 3166
    - ISO 3166-1
    - ISO 3166-2
    - ISO 3166-3
  - List of ISO 3166 country codes
- Lists of countries and territories
  - Sovereign state
    - List of sovereign states
    - List of states with limited recognition
  - Dependent territory
- United Nations
  - Member states of the United Nations
  - United Nations list of non-self-governing territories

== Sources and external links ==
- ISO 3166 Maintenance Agency, International Organization for Standardization (ISO)
  - Country codes - Online Browsing Platform (OBP)
- Administrative Divisions of Countries ("Statoids"), Statoids.com
  - ISO 3166-1 Change History
