= Prefecture =

Administrative jurisdiction or subdivision in various countries

A prefecture (from the Latin word præfectura) is an administrative jurisdiction traditionally governed by an appointed prefect. This can be a regional or local government subdivision in various countries, or a subdivision in certain international church structures. During the antiquity, it was the name of a type of Roman district. In the 21st century, the term prefecture is used for the modern first-level subdivisions of the Central African Republic, Japan, and Morocco.

== Literal prefectures ==
=== Antiquity ===
Prefecture originally referred to several distinct administrative structures in ancient Rome.

In the Roman Republic and early Empire, a praefectura was a town or community lacking full civic autonomy and administered by a Roman-appointed Praefectus. These praefecturae were common in Italy before the extension of Roman citizenship and typically occupied a lower legal status than a municipium or colonia.

Later, during the Tetrarchy, Emperor Diocletian reorganized the Roman Empire into four major administrative divisions known as praetorian prefectures. Each was composed of several dioceses and governed by a senior official called a Praetorian prefect. This structure persisted into the Byzantine Empire and influenced later forms of territorial governance.

=== Ecclesiastic ===
As Catholic canon law is strongly inspired by Roman law, it is not surprising that the Catholic Church has several offices under a prefect. That term occurs also in otherwise styled offices, such as the head of a congregation or department of the Roman Curia. Various ecclesiastical areas, too small for a diocese, are termed prefects.

== Analogous prefectures ==
=== Brazilian equivalent of prefecture ===
In Brazil, the prefecture (prefeitura or prefeitura municipal in Portuguese) is the executive branch of the government of each Brazilian municipality (município in Portuguese). The term also refers to the office of the mayor (prefeito in Portuguese).

=== Central African Republic ===
The Central African Republic is divided into twenty prefectures.

=== Greek equivalent of prefecture ===
From 1836 until 2011, modern Greece was divided into nomoi (Greek: νομοί, singular νομός, nomos) which formed the country's main administrative units. These are most commonly translated into English as "prefectures" or "counties".

Each nomos was headed by a prefect (νομάρχης, nomarches), who was a ministerial appointee until ca. 1990, but was then elected by direct popular vote in a process of decentralization that saw the prefectures become local government units. Municipal elections in Greece are held every four years and voting for the election of prefects and mayors was carried out concurrently but with separate ballots.

The 2010 Kallikratis plan, which took effect on 1 January 2011, abolished the prefectures as separate administrative units, and transformed them into regional units within the country's thirteen administrative regions.

=== Chinese equivalents of prefecture ===
==== The ancient sense ====
Xian (縣)

When used in the context of Chinese history, especially China before the Tang dynasty, the word "prefecture" is used to translate xian (縣). This unit of administration is translated as "county" when used in a contemporary context, because of the increase of the number of "xian" and the decrease of their sizes over time in the Chinese history.

Zhou (州) or Fu (府)

In the context of Chinese history during or after the Tang dynasty, the word "prefecture" is used to translate zhou (Wade–Giles chou (州), another ancient unit of administration in China, equivalent to the modern province.

==== The modern sense ====
In modern-day China, the prefecture (地区; pinyin: dìqū) is an administrative division found in the second level of the administrative hierarchy. In addition to prefectures, this level also includes autonomous prefectures, leagues, and prefecture-level cities. The prefecture level comes under the province level, and in turn oversees the county level.

=== Italian prefettura ===
In Italy a prefettura is the office of a prefetto, the representative of the Government in each province.

=== French préfecture ===
In France, a préfecture is the capital city of a department, and by metonymy also designates the office and residence of the prefect. As there are 101 departments in France, there are 101 prefectures. A préfecture de région is the capital city of an administrative region. This is the city where the prefect – the appointed government representative – resides.

=== Japanese sense of prefecture ===
In English, "prefecture" is used as the translation for todōfuken (都道府県), which are the main subdivisions of Japan. They consist of 43 prefectures (県 ken) proper, two urban prefectures (府 fu, Osaka and Kyoto), one "circuit" or "territory" (道 dō, Hokkaido) and one "metropolis" (都 to, Tokyo). Before the end of World War II, the word was also used for overseas areas 庁 (chō)、州 (shū) and 道 (dō, in Korea).

=== Korean equivalents of prefecture ===
Until 1894 Hyeon (Korean: 현; Hanja: 縣) was the lowest level administrative division in Korea and can be translated into "Petty Prefecture" in the modern sense. It was below Gun (군, 郡; "county") in the administrative hierarchy.

Dohobu (도호부; 都護府) was a higher level administrative division and can be translated into "Protectorate General", "Greater Prefecture", "Metropolitan Prefecture", or "Martial Prefecture" in the modern sense. The capital, Hanyang (Seoul), can sometimes be translated as "Hanseong Prefecture".

In 1895, Hyeon and Dohobu divisions were abolished. From 1910 to 1949, the term "prefecture" was used to translate Bu (부; 府). Since 1949 neither Hyeon nor Bu have been used, and there has been no division in either the South Korean or North Korean administrative system which translates as "prefecture".

=== Mongolian equivalent ===
Mongolian prefectures (Aimags) were adopted during Qing dynasty's rule. Today these are usually translated as "provinces".

=== Moroccan Préfecture ===
In Morocco, the 75 second-level administrative subdivisions are 13 prefectures and 62 provinces. They are subdivisions of the 12 regions of Morocco. Each prefecture and province are subdivided in their turn into districts (cercles, sing. cercle), municipalities (communes, sing. commune) or urban municipalities (communes urbaines, sing. commune urbaine), and arrondissements in some metropolitan areas.

=== Swiss préfecture ===
In Switzerland, préfecture dates back to the Helvetic Republic and were inspired by France. As of 2025, five cantons still have préfectures, including Berne, Fribourg, Neuchatel, Valais, Vaud. The préfecture is a local representative of the regional government.

=== Venezuelan equivalent ===
Traditionally, the term prefecture referred to a City Hall and the prefect was the equivalent of a mayor and commissioner. After recent changes, the prefectures and prefects are analogous with the figure of Town Clerk.

Quebec Equivalent

In the province of Quebec, a prefect (préfet in French) is the head of a Regional County Municipality (RCM / MRC). The method of selecting the prefect varies: in some RCMs, the prefect is elected by the mayors of the municipalities within the RCM, while in others, the prefect is elected directly by all voters during municipal elections. The prefect coordinates regional planning, infrastructure, and shared municipal services, while municipalities retain authority over local matters. The prefect also serves as a liaison between the RCM and the provincial government.

== See also ==
- Apostolic prefecture
- County
- Prefectures of China
- Politics of the People's Republic of China
- Prefectures of Japan
- Politics of Japan
- Politics of the Republic of China
- Politics of Mongolia
- Province
- Subprefecture
- Prefectures of Togo
