= Danish Patent and Trademark Office =

The Danish Patent and Trademark Office (DKPTO) is the patent office of Denmark. As of 2013, its director general was Jesper Kongstad. Sune Stampe Sørensen succeeded Jesper Kongstad in October 2017.

== See also ==
- Nordic Patent Institute
