= Decentralization in Rwanda =

In the year 2000, Rwanda began a decentralization process by adopting a National Decentralization Policy. The policy's objective were to promote good governance, to reduce poverty and to promote efficient, effective, and accountable service delivery.

As a result, local governments have become main implementers of national policies, executing more than 25% of the domestic budget in 2011–2012 and employing 50% of the Rwandan administration.

== Administrative layers ==
Prior to 2002, Rwanda was composed of prefectures, subprefectures and communes. The Government of Rwanda reshaped the institutional framework of local governments into five major administrative layers and reduced their number by a territorial reform in 2006. Today Rwanda is composed of 5 provinces, 30 districts, 416 sectors, 2,148 cells and 14,837 villages.

Elections are established at every tier of local government, except the provincial level, where the governor is appointed by the national government. Elections are only direct elections by the citizens at the cell level. Members of sector and district councils are elected indirectly from the level below, with reserved seats for representatives of the interest groups of women and of youth. No candidate at local elections can claim partisan affiliation.

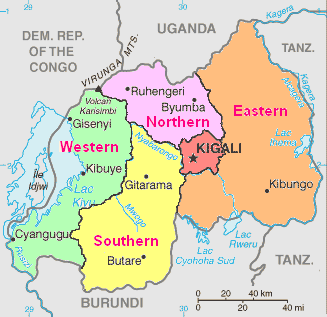
Provinces of Rwanda

=== Provinces ===
Provinces have a coordination function of districts and serve as representatives of the national government. They control the legality of the district council's decisions. Rwanda's five provinces are Northern Province, Eastern Province, Southern Province, Western Province and City of Kigali.

=== Districts ===
Districts are the most important layer of Rwanda's decentralization system as they have financial and legal independence. Districts are divided into sectors and cells. Districts appoint the executive secretaries for the sector and cell levels. Executive secretaries are the head of management and technical units of administrations. Districts coordinate the delivery of public services and can apply for grants for investment projects.

The District Council is the body representing citizen interests at the district level. The mayor and the vice-mayors are elected by the council and can be removed by it as well.

=== Sectors ===
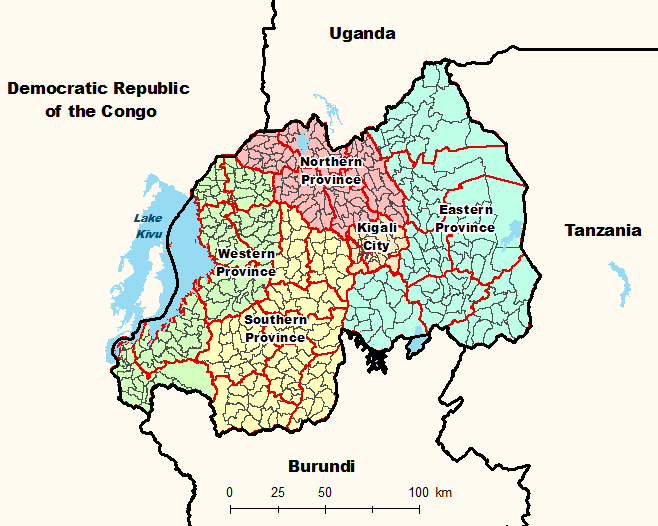
The districts and sectors of Rwanda

A 10-member elected Sector Executive Committee is responsible for the delivery of public services to the population, data reporting, and mobilization in each sector. They provide citizens with administrative documents.

=== Cells ===
Cells are mostly involved in community mobilization and data reporting. They have their own staff of technicians, even though limited.

Cells are governed by a Cell Executive Committee, composed of ten members. These members are elected by a Cell Council, composed of all residents of the cell aged over 18 years. The Cell Council is mobilized to identify and discuss problems and priorities of the cell.

=== Villages ===
Villages are not administrative units but they are official communication channels and can be used for the mobilization of citizens.

== Financial decentralization ==
Local government budget mostly derives from national government transfers and locally raised revenues.

National transfers include:

- A recurrent block grant from the Local Authority Budget Support Fund, covering functioning costs (as the payment of staff salaries) and improvement of service delivery.
- Capital block grants, for infrastructure investment foreseen by the District Development Plan and grants precisely earmarked by the central government.
- Inter-entity transfers, from other government or external agencies (like international donors).

Districts can use their own revenue in full freedom, however in 2012–2013, those revenues represented only 16% of the district budget.

Aggregate income for local government 2013–2014
INCOME	RWF (bn)
Centre-local transfers	
Earmarked transfers	206,798
Block grants	31,889
Government agency transfers	16,604
External grants	31,055
Locally raised revenue	71,629
TOTAL INCOME	357,975

== Articulation between local and national government priorities ==
The Ministry of Local Government (MINALOC) oversees local governance in Rwanda.

=== District Development Plans ===
Planning at district levels is based on a five-year District Development Plan. District Development Plans are approved by the District Council. They are disaggregated into yearly action plans called Imihigo.

=== Imihigo or Performance Contracts ===
The target-based approach of performance contracts or Imihigos aims primarily at improving the effectiveness of government program execution and increasing the speed and quality of service delivery by local governments. The public monitoring and evaluation of local governments performance through the Imihigo system in fact puts important pressure on mayors and administrations. Imihigo is also considered as an instrument of citizen participation, because local government's development objectives should be based on the collection of citizens’ needs during various community assemblies.

== See also ==
- Constitution of Rwanda
- Geography of Rwanda
- Subdivisions of Rwanda
