= .pw =

Internet country code top-level domain for Palau

- Introduced: 12 June 1997
- TLD type: Country code top-level domain
- Status: Active
- Registry: Radix
- Sponsor: Micronesia Investment and Development Corporation
- Intended use: Entities connected with Palau
- Actual use: Marketed as dedicated namespace to use as a professional identity on the web and as an acronym for Public Wallet. Can be registered and used for any purpose.
- Registration restrictions: None
- Structure: Registrations can be made directly at second level.
- Documents: Policies
- Dispute policies: UDRP
- DNSSEC: yes
- Registry website: radix.website/dot-pw registry.pw

.pw is the country code top-level domain for the Republic of Palau.

== History ==
The country code top-level domain .pw was delegated to the Pacific island nation of Palau in 1997. It has since been redelegated a number of times. Directi, a group of technology businesses, obtained exclusive rights over .pw from EnCirca in 2004. From 25 March 2013, domains under the .pw TLD are available to the general public. Since then, it is sometimes marketed as a domain for professionals (professional web).

In July 2013 the registry announced that they had passed the 250,000 registration milestone within the first three months, after having 50,000 registered domains in the first three weeks.

== Issues ==
A few months after opening the registry to the general public, .pw became the target of spammers. Symantec released two reports in April and May 2013 claiming that domains under .pw TLD were a significant source of spam e-mail. Directi responded that it had zero tolerance for spam and would be deleting domains accused of violating its anti-abuse policy.

In 2016, the Anti-Phishing Working Group stated that the .cc, .com, .pw, and .tk domain names account for 75% of all malicious domain registrations.

== See also ==
- Internet in Palau
- List of Internet top-level domains § Country code top-level domains
