= Subdivisions of Sudan =

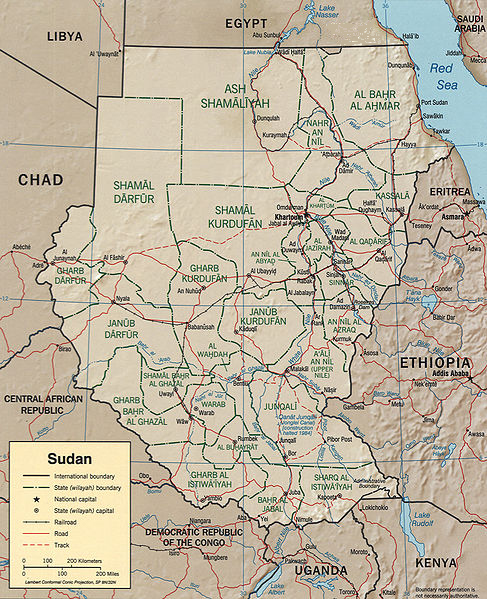
Political map of Sudan. Halaib Triangle has been under Egyptian administration since 2000.

Sudan is divided into fifteen states (wilayat, sing. wilayah) which in turn are subdivided into 86 districts. Before the secession of South Sudan on July 9, 2011, Sudan was the largest country in Africa and had 25 states.

At its independence on January 1, 1956, Sudan was divided into 9 historic regions that had existed in 1948 (Bahr el-Ghazal, Blue Nile, Darfur, Equatoria, Kassala, Khartoum, Kordofan, Northern and Upper Nile). Starting in 1973, a new series of divisions led to 18 regions being established (mudiryas) in 1976. In 1991, Sudan reverted to a structure of 9 provinces (wilaya) corresponding to its 9 former historic regions. In 1994, the number of provinces increased to 26. Western Kordofan was abolished in 2005, and restored in 2013. On 9 Jul 2011, the 10 southern states became part of independent South Sudan.
