= .tk =

Country code top-level domain for Tokelau

- Introduced: 7 November 1997
- TLD type: Country code top-level domain
- Status: Active
- Registry: Dot TK (run by BV Dot TK)
- Sponsor: Government of Tokelau and Teletok
- Intended use: Entities connected with Tokelau
- Actual use: Varied site topics; few sites relate to Tokelau
- Registration restrictions: Yes, for free domains only
- Structure: Registrations are taken directly at the second level; domains are redirected to actual website addresses within a frame, or point directly to a webserver or nameserver.
- Documents: Registration Agreement (free domains); Registration Agreement (paid domains)
- Dispute policies: UDRP (paid domains only)
- Registry website: dot.tk

.tk is the country code top-level domain (ccTLD) for Tokelau, a territory of New Zealand in the South Pacific.

The .tk TLD is managed by Teletok, a local telecommunications company who outsourced the domain registry operation to the Dutch company Freenom, who was additionally also acting as a registrar. As Freenom offered free registration, the .tk ending was often associated with malicious activities like phishing, spam and cybersquatting. In 2023, Freenom stopped offering new .tk registrations in their registrar business as a result of a lawsuit with Meta. Their registry operations for other registrars were not affected by this. Freenom announced it would exit the domain registry and registrar business in February 2024.

Teletok opened negotiations with the domain registry operator of .nz, for help in managing .tk after Freenom's exit.

== Overview ==
Tokelau allows any individual to register domain names. Users and small businesses were able to register any number of domain names free of charge (with some restrictions). In addition to the name itself, users can opt to forward their web traffic using HTML frames and their email traffic, with a maximum of 250 addresses per user log in, or use full DNS, either via their own or third-party servers, or by using Dot TK's servers. There are content restrictions for free domains, banning sites containing sexual content, drug use, hate speech, firearms, and spam or copyright infringement. Dot TK requires free domains to have a regular traffic of visitors, and if a domain's redirect target does not work (even temporarily) the domain is taken offline. If a domain violates any of these terms, it is replaced by a Sedo advertisement page, and no advance warning is given.

Dot TK also provides .tk websites with the option to join a network called TiKinet, a close-knit network that links sites to each other based on keywords called TiKilinks. The network is expected to increase traffic to the websites, many of which are personal sites and blogs operated by individuals who otherwise would have no way to advertise their sites.

To be able to get a "special" .tk domain name the user must buy it. This includes trademark domain names for most Fortune 500 companies and common dictionary terms. Paid domain names cost US$19.90 for the first two years. Potentially valuable names with fewer than 4 characters are similarly unavailable for free registration and must generally be purchased at a premium price of over $1000.

Dot TK launched a new service called TweaK for Twitter users in April 2010, offering a URL shortening service that uses less space than many others, and for Facebook where the user can rename Facebook account pages with a .tk name.

In 2016, Nominet released a world map where each country was resized according to the popularity of its top-level domain. The .tk domain ranked first worldwide with 31,311,498 registered domain names (China (.cn) ranked 2nd with 16,810,737 registered domain names). The revenues from the .tk top-level domain business represent about 1/6 of the island's annual income.

== Criticism ==
In 2006, McAfee conducted a survey in which they claim out of the 95 percent most trafficked web sites, .tk domains were twice as likely as the global average to be used for "unwanted behaviours", including scams such as phishing and spam. However, in 2008 McAfee reported that the threat of scams like phishing and spam was significantly reduced with .tk and that other top level domains such as .com and .net were much more used in such scams.

A 2011 report by the Anti Phishing Working Group blamed Tokelau's bad reputation on the registry Dot TK. It acquired the right to operate the top level domain and is responsible for the free registration system. .tk domains logged 2533 of 11768 (~21.5%) total phishing attacks in the second half of 2010 Internet-wide.

A 2018 report by Michelle Base-Bursey stated that, "The third most prevalent TLD for phishing attacks is .tk, the country code for Tokelau, a territory north of New Zealand in the South Pacific."

In 2016, the Anti-Phishing Working Group stated that the .cc, .com, .pw, and .tk domain names accounted for 75% of all malicious domain registrations.

On 3 March 2023, Meta filed a lawsuit against Freenom alleging cybersquatting violations and trademark infringement, and new domain registrations were halted. The lawsuit references a 2021 study on the abuse of domains conducted by Interisle Consulting Group, which discovered that the ccTLDs operated by Freenom made up five of the top ten TLDs most abused by phishers. In November 2023, ICANN terminated its registrar accreditation agreement with Freenom due to failure to cure breaches of the agreement within 21 days of notice. On 12 February 2024, Freenom announced that it had settled the lawsuit with Meta under undisclosed terms, and that it would exit the domain name and registry business.

By early March 2024, around 99% of Freenom domains (mostly those under .tk, .cf, and .gq), roughly 12.6 million, were no longer accessible, although it was reported that some paid domains were still active. Most of these domains hosted their DNS with Cloudflare, which consequently saw a 22% drop in its number of hosted domains.
