= Subdivisions of Djibouti =

Structure description

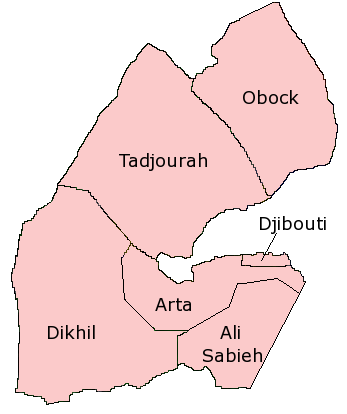
Map of the regions of Djibouti

Djibouti is sectioned into 5 regions and one city. It is further subdivided into 20 sub-prefectures.

The regions and city are:

- Ali Sabieh Region (Région d'Ali Sabieh)
- Arta Region (Région d'Arta)
- Dikhil Region (Région de Dikhil)
- Djibouti (city) (Ville de Djibouti)
- Obock Region (Région d'Obock)
- Tadjourah Region (Région de Tadjourah)
