= Subdivisions of Rwanda =

Map of provinces, 2006

Rwanda is divided into four provinces (intara) and the City of Kigali, which are subdivided into thirty districts (uturere).

== Provinces ==
Rwanda comprises four provinces and one province-level city:

- Northern Province
- Eastern Province
- Southern Province
- Western Province
- City of Kigali

Prior to 1 January 2006, Rwanda was composed of twelve provinces (known as prefectures up to 2001), but these were abolished in full and redrawn as part of a program of decentralization and reorganization.

== See also ==
- Decentralization in Rwanda
- Geography of Rwanda
