= Subdivisions of the Central African Republic =

The Central African Republic is divided into 20 prefectures (18 administrative prefectures and 2 economic prefectures ) one prefecture was formerly an autonomous commune but was changed in December 2020. The prefectures (préfectures) are further divided into 84 sub-prefectures (sous-préfectures).

== Prefectures ==
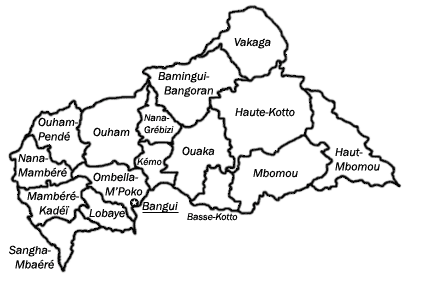
Prefectures of the Central African Republic.

The prefectures consist of the following:

- Bamingui-Bangoran
- Bangui (Prefecture)
- Basse-Kotto
- Haute-Kotto
- Haut-Mbomou
- Kémo
- Lobaye
- Lim-Pendé
- Mambéré
- Mambéré-Kadéï
- Mbomou
- Nana-Grébizi
- Nana-Mambéré
- Ombella-M'Poko
- Ouaka
- Ouham
- Ouham-Fafa
- Ouham-Pendé
- Sangha-Mbaéré
- Vakaga

The two economic prefectures are Nana-Grébizi and Sangha-Mbaéré; the special commune and capital city is Bangui.

== See also ==
- Sub-prefectures of the Central African Republic
