= .cc =

Top-level Internet domain for the Cocos (Keeling) Islands

- Introduced: 13 October 1997
- TLD type: Country code top-level domain
- Status: Active
- Registry: eNIC (a VeriSign company)
- Sponsor: Island Internet Services
- Intended use: Entities connected with Cocos (Keeling) Islands
- Actual use: See usage
- Registration restrictions: None
- Structure: Registrations permitted at second level
- Documents: Registration agreement
- Dispute policies: UDRP
- Registry website: Verisign .cc Registry

.cc is the Internet country code top-level domain (ccTLD) for the Cocos (Keeling) Islands, an Australian territory.

== Management ==
It is administered by an American company, VeriSign, through a subsidiary company, eNIC, which promotes it for international registration as "the next .com".

The .cc domain was originally assigned to eNIC in October 1997 by the IANA; eNIC manages the TLD alongside SamsDirect Internet.

== Registration ==
Registration is made directly at second-level.

=== gov.cu.cc, com.cc, net.cc, edu.cc, org.cc ===
A number of second-level domain names are also maintained by CoCCA, including "com.cc", "net.cc", "edu.cc", and "org.cc".

=== cc.cc, co.cc, cu.cc, cz.cc ===
These are not official hierarchies of .cc, but domains held by companies who offer no charge subdomain registration.

=== co.cc ===
The co.cc URL has been known to host spammers, who create spam blogs, or "splogs", often with nonsense names.

Due to such spamming, in July 2011 Google removed over 11 million .co.cc websites from its search results.

Legitimate sites (per Google's Webmaster Guidelines) on the .co.cc subdomain could send a reconsideration request to Google to have their specific site excluded from the ban.

The abundance of cheap .co.cc domains had also been used by those who sold fake "anti-virus" programs.

From 2012 to 2014, the co.cc website and name servers were not online. There was no formal statement by the company, but they did stop accepting new registrations some time before they closed.

In 2018, co.cc was listed for sale for US$500,000. As of 2019, co.cc is registered to and in use by another entity.

== Usage ==
The Turkish Republic of Northern Cyprus also uses the .cc domain, along with .nc.tr.

Google treats .cc as a generic top-level domain (gTLD) because "users and website owners frequently see [the domain] as being more generic than country-targeted."

The TLD is preferred by many cricket and cycling clubs, as well as churches and Christian organisations, since "CC" can be an abbreviation for "Christian Church" or "Catholic Church".

Some open-source/open-hardware projects, such as the Arduino project, use .cc for their home pages, since "CC" is also the abbreviation for "Creative Commons", whose licences are used in the projects.

Business owners in Southern Massachusetts are rapidly adopting Cape Cod CC domains for local identity. Canadian Club whiskey has also used .cc domains for marketing purposes.

It is also used for some community colleges, though other domains, such as .edu, are more popular.

== Issues ==
In 2016, the Anti-Phishing Working Group stated that the .cc, .com, .pw, and .tk domain names account for 75% of all malicious domain registrations.

== See also ==
- .au
