= .sd =

Internet country code top-level domain for Sudan

- Introduced: 6 March 1997
- TLD type: Country code top-level domain
- Status: Active
- Registry: Sudan Domains Registry
- Sponsor: Sudan Internet Society
- Intended use: Entities connected with Sudan
- Actual use: Not very much used
- Registration restrictions: Generally none, applications screened by registry; may be limited based on which second-level category they are under
- Structure: Names are registered at second level or at third level beneath various second-level categories
- Documents: ICANN agreement; Terms and conditions, Policies
- Dispute policies: None
- Registry website: www.domains.sd

.sd is the Internet country code top-level domain (ccTLD) for Sudan.

== 2nd level domains ==
- com.sd - Companies
- net.sd - Network providers and ISPs
- org.sd - Sudanese NGOs
- edu.sd - Sudanese universities and colleges
- med.sd - Medical
- tv.sd - TV channels and Electronic media
- gov.sd - Sudanese government and ministries
- info.sd - Newspapers, information, and media

== Second top domain ==
A new internationalized country code top-level domain string using Arabic letters, سودان, was reserved for Sudan in November 2012.
