= Nordic Patent Institute =

- Type: Intergovernmental organization
- Industry: PCT International Searching Authority; PCT International Preliminary Examining Authority; Prior art search provider
- Founded: July 5, 2006
- Headquarters: Taastrup, Denmark
- Area served: Worldwide
- Key people: Lone Hartung Nielsen (Director-general); Grétar Ingi Grétarsson (Vice-Director); Borghildur Erlingsdóttir (Board chair)
- Services: International Search and examination Invalidity/Validity Searches; Novelty Searches; Clearance Searches; FTO Searches; Sequence Searches; Landscape Searches; Patent Watch Services
- Number of employees: 8 + 150 examiners from DKPTO and NIPO
- Website: www.npi.int

The Nordic Patent Institute (NPI) is an intergovernmental organisation established by the governments of Denmark, Iceland and Norway. It is based in Taastrup, Denmark. Since January 1, 2008, the Institute acts as Patent Cooperation Treaty (PCT) authority. As of May 1, 2013, it is, with the European Patent Office and the Swedish Patent and Registration Office, one of the three International Searching Authorities (ISA) and International Preliminary Examining Authorities (IPEA) available for international applications filed with the Receiving Offices of Denmark, Iceland, Norway and Sweden. It also carries out Supplementary International Searches in Danish, English, Icelandic, Norwegian and Swedish.

Its two-letter code is XN.

Nordic Patent Institute also performs patent search and analysis on a commercial basis for companies and IP law firms.

== See also ==
- Danish Patent and Trademark Office
- Norwegian Industrial Property Office
- Visegrad Patent Institute
