= Visegrad Patent Institute =

Organization created by patent offices of four countries

The Visegrad Patent Institute (VPI; Czech: Visegrádský Patentový Institut; Slovak: Vyšehradský Patentový Inštitút; Hungarian: Visegrádi Szabadalmi Intézet; Polish: Wyszehradzki Instytut Patentowy) is an international organization for cooperation in the field of patents, created by the national patent offices of the four Visegrad countries, namely the Czech Republic, Hungary, Poland and Slovakia. The Agreement on the Visegrad Patent Institute (VPI Agreement) was signed in Bratislava on February 26, 2015. The Institute acts as an International Searching Authority (ISA) and International Preliminary Examining Authorities (IPEA) under the Patent Cooperation Treaty (PCT).

According to Slovak Foreign Affairs Minister Miroslav Lajčák, the signature of the agreement on creating the Visegrad Patent Institute was an important milestone in the history of the Visegrád Group, the alliance between Czech Republic, Hungary, Poland and Slovakia.

== See also ==
- Nordic Patent Institute, an intergovernmental organisation established by the governments of Denmark, Iceland and Norway
- Polish Patent Office
