= ISO 3166 =

Standard codes for geographical names

ISO 3166 is a standard published by the International Organization for Standardization (ISO) that defines codes for the names of countries, dependent territories, special areas of geographical interest, and their principal subdivisions (e.g., provinces or states). The official name of the standard is Codes for the representation of names of countries and their subdivisions.

== Parts ==
It consists of three parts:

- ISO 3166-1, Codes for the representation of names of countries and their subdivisions – Part 1: Country code, defines codes for the names of countries, dependent territories, and special areas of geographical interest. It defines three sets of country codes:
  - ISO 3166-1 alpha-2 – two-letter country codes, which are the most widely used of the three, and used most prominently for the Internet's country code top-level domains (with a few exceptions).
  - ISO 3166-1 alpha-3 – three-letter country codes, which allow a better visual association between the codes and the country names than the alpha-2 codes.
  - ISO 3166-1 numeric – three-digit country codes, which are identical to those developed and maintained by the United Nations Statistics Division, with the advantage of script (writing system) independence, and hence useful for people or systems using non-Latin scripts.
- ISO 3166-2, Codes for the representation of names of countries and their subdivisions – Part 2: Country subdivision code, defines codes for the names of the principal subdivisions (e.g., provinces, states, departments, regions) of all countries coded in ISO 3166-1.
- ISO 3166-3, Codes for the representation of names of countries and their subdivisions – Part 3: Code for formerly used names of countries, defines codes for country names which have been deleted from ISO 3166-1 since its first publication in 1974.

== Editions ==
The first edition of ISO 3166, which included only alphabetic country codes, was published in 1974. The second edition, published in 1981, also included numeric country codes, with the third and fourth editions published in 1988 and 1993 respectively. The fifth edition, published between 1997 and 1999, was expanded into three parts to include codes for subdivisions and former countries.

== ISO 3166 Maintenance Agency ==
The ISO 3166 standard is maintained by the ISO 3166 Maintenance Agency (ISO 3166/MA), located at the ISO central office in Geneva. Originally it was located at the Deutsches Institut für Normung (DIN) in Berlin. Its principal tasks are:

- To add and to eliminate country names and to assign code elements to them;
- To publish lists of country names and code elements;
- To maintain a reference list of all country code elements and subdivision code elements used and their period of use;
- To issue newsletters announcing changes to the code tables;
- To advise users on the application of ISO 3166.

=== Members ===
There are fifteen experts with voting rights on the ISO 3166/MA. Nine are representatives of national standards organizations:

- Association française de normalisation (AFNOR) – France
- American National Standards Institute (ANSI) – United States
- British Standards Institution (BSI) – United Kingdom
- Deutsches Institut für Normung (DIN) – Germany
- Japanese Industrial Standards Committee (JISC) – Japan
- Standards Australia (SA) – Australia
- Kenya Bureau of Standards (KEBS) – Kenya
- Standardization Administration of China (SAC) – China
- Swedish Standards Institute (SIS) – Sweden

The other six are representatives of major United Nations agencies or other international organizations who are all users of ISO 3166-1:

- International Atomic Energy Agency (IAEA)
- International Civil Aviation Organization (ICAO)
- International Telecommunication Union (ITU)
- Internet Corporation for Assigned Names and Numbers (ICANN)
- Universal Postal Union (UPU)
- United Nations Economic Commission for Europe (UNECE)

The ISO 3166/MA has further associated members who do not participate in the votes but who, through their expertise, have significant influence on the decision-taking procedure in the maintenance agency.

== Codes beginning with "X" ==
Country codes beginning with "X" are used for private custom use (reserved), never for official codes. Despite the words "private custom", the use may include other public standards. ISO affirms that no country code beginning with X will ever be standardised. (Note: XK for Kosovo is a unilateral "user assigned code" and not an ISO 3166 standard country code.) Examples of X codes include:

- The ISO 3166-based NATO country codes (STANAG 1059, 9th edition) use "X" codes for imaginary exercise countries ranging from XXB for "Brownland" to XXY for "Yellowland", as well as for major commands such as XXE for SHAPE or XXS for SACLANT.
- X currencies defined in ISO 4217.

== See also ==
- International Organization for Standardization – International standards development organization
  - ISO standards
  - ISO 3166
    - ISO 3166-1 – ISO standard for country codes
      - ISO 3166-1 alpha-2 – Two-letter country codes defined in ISO 3166-1
      - ISO 3166-1 alpha-3 – Three-letter country codes defined in ISO 3166-1
      - ISO 3166-1 numeric – Three-digit numeric code to identify countries
    - ISO 3166-2 – ISO standard country subdivision codes
    - ISO 3166-3 – Code for formerly used names of countries
  - List of ISO 3166 country codes – Two or three letter codes that represent each country
- Country code – Identification code for countries
  - International vehicle registration code – Codes used to identify where a vehicle is registered
- Lists of sovereign states and dependent territories
  - Sovereign state – State having the highest authority over a territory
    - List of sovereign states
    - List of associated states – Minor partner in a formal, free relationship with a typically larger state
    - List of de facto states
  - Dependent territory – Territory that does not possess full political independence as a sovereign state
- United Nations – Global intergovernmental organization
  - Member states of the United Nations
  - United Nations list of non-self-governing territories – Type of territory defined by the United Nations Charter
