= Ranked lists of Chilean regions =

This article includes several ranked indicators for Chile's regions.

== By area ==
Chilean regions by area.

Region	Area (km^{2})	Area (mi^{2})
Arica and Parinacota	16,873.3	6,514.8
Tarapacá	42,225.8	16,303.5
Antofagasta	126,049.1	48,667.8
Atacama	75,176.2	29,025.7
Coquimbo	40,579.9	15,668.0
Valparaíso	16,396.1	6,330.6
Santiago	15,403.2	5,947.2
O'Higgins	16,387.0	6,327.1
Maule	30,296.1	11,697.4
Ñuble	13,178.5	5,088.2
Biobío	23,890.2	9,224.1
Araucanía	31,842.3	12,294.4
Los Ríos	18,429.5	7,115.7
Los Lagos	48,583.6	18,758.2
Aisén	108,494.4	41,889.9
Magallanes	132,291.1	51,077.9
Chile	756,096.3	291,930.4

Sources: "División Político Administrativa y Censal 2007 ", National Statistics Office, 2007 (Chile area data); CIA's The World Factbook (country area comparison).
Note: It does not include the Chilean Antarctic Territory, annexed to the Magallanes Region and totalling 1,250,000 square kilometres (480,000 sq mi).

== Population ==
=== By population ===
Chilean regions by population as of June 30, 2015.

Region	Men	Women	Total	%
Arica and Parinacota	120,566	118,560	239,126	1.33
Tarapacá	174,128	162,641	336,769	1.87
Antofagasta	326,032	296,608	622,640	3.46
Atacama	161,381	151,105	312,486	1.74
Coquimbo	382,004	389,081	771,085	4.28
Valparaíso	896,720	929,037	1,825,757	10.14
Santiago	3,578,730	3,735,446	7,314,176	40.62
O'Higgins	461,205	457,546	918,751	5.10
Maule	517,428	525,561	1,042,989	5.79
Biobío	1,039,596	1,074,690	2,114,286	11.74
Araucanía	487,581	502,217	989,798	5.50
Los Ríos	202,230	202,202	404,432	2.25
Los Lagos	423,107	418,016	841,123	4.67
Aisén	56,380	51,948	108,328	0.60
Magallanes	84,852	79,809	164,661	0.91
Chile	8,911,940	9,094,467	18,006,407	100.00

Sources: National Statistics Office's September 2014 projections (Chile's population), accessed on 28 June 2015; UNDESA's World Population Prospects: The 2012 Revision, September 2013, accessed on 28 June 2015 (country comparison).

=== By urban and rural population ===
Chilean regions by their urban and rural population as of June 30, 2010.

Region	Urban	Rural	% Urban	% Rural
Arica and Parinacota	167,343	17,614	90.5	9.5
Tarapacá	294,026	20,508	93.5	6.5
Antofagasta	560,801	14,467	97.5	2.5
Atacama	254,783	25,760	90.8	9.2
Coquimbo	578,245	140,472	80.5	19.5
Valparaíso	1,610,211	148,956	91.5	8.5
Santiago	6,655,975	227,588	96.7	3.3
O'Higgins	626,417	256,951	70.9	29.1
Maule	676,615	331,216	67.1	32.9
Biobío	1,699,819	336,624	83.5	16.5
Araucanía	659,274	311,145	67.9	32.1
Los Ríos	260,445	119,264	68.6	31.4
Los Lagos	588,352	247,904	70.4	29.6
Aisén	88,376	16,467	84.3	15.7
Magallanes	147,490	11,167	93.0	7.0
Chile	14,868,172	2,226,103	87.0	13.0

Sources: National Statistics Office (Chile's population).

=== By population density ===
Chilean regions by population density as of 2010.

Region	Density (/km^{2})	Density (/mi^{2})
Arica and Parinacota	11.0	28
Tarapacá	7.4	19
Antofagasta	4.6	12
Atacama	3.7	9.6
Coquimbo	17.7	46
Valparaíso	107.3	278
Santiago	446.9	1,157
O'Higgins	53.9	140
Maule	33.3	86
Biobío	54.9	142
Araucanía	30.5	79
Los Ríos	20.6	53
Los Lagos	17.2	45
Aisén	1.0	2.6
Magallanes	1.2	3.1
Chile	22.6	59

Sources: National Statistics Office (Chile area data, Chile's population); Wikipedia's List of countries and dependencies by population density (country comparison).
Note: It does not include the internationally unrecognized Chilean Antarctic Territory, annexed to the Magallanes and Antártica Chilena Region and totalling 1,250,000 square kilometres (480,000 sq mi).

=== By number of households and household size ===
Chilean regions by number of households and household size in 2013.

Region	Population	Households	Persons per household
Arica and Parinacota	171,569	50,387	3.41
Tarapacá	315,445	87,852	3.59
Antofagasta	562,488	151,534	3.71
Atacama	277,540	78,508	3.54
Coquimbo	738,492	208,838	3.54
Valparaíso	1,790,460	564,715	3.17
Santiago	7,009,092	2,153,622	3.25
O'Higgins	899,261	276,141	3.26
Maule	1,017,965	327,644	3.11
Biobío	2,042,044	612,488	3.33
Araucanía	968,430	299,810	3.23
Los Ríos	367,984	117,788	3.12
Los Lagos	844,187	264,403	3.19
Aisén	101,368	32,984	3.07
Magallanes	149,894	47,114	3.18
Chile	17,256,219	5,273,828	3.27

Source: Casen Survey 2013, Ministry of Social Development of Chile.
Note: Data exclude live-in domestic workers and their family.

=== By indigenous population ===
Chilean regions by persons self-identifying as belonging to one of Chile's indigenous groups in 2013.

Region	Indigenous population	% of regional population	Aimara	Rapanui^{a}	Quechua	Mapuche	Atacameño (Likan Antai)	Colla	Kawashkar (Alacalufe)	Yámana (Yagán)	Diaguita
Arica and Parinacota	54,504	31.7%	47,627	0	973	3,727	320	68	54	0	1,306
Tarapacá	56,753	18.0%	37,307	163	5,623	9,674	111	709	0	0	2,937
Antofagasta	51,516	9.2%	6,901	132	8,302	8,882	19,754	652	10	0	5,990
Atacama	41,069	14.8%	2,079	25	9	5,126	430	9,910	0	50	23,091
Coquimbo	33,773	4.6%	3,338	85	1,499	12,483	1,416	903	144	405	7,589
Valparaíso	56,609	3.2%	3,082	353	5	49,950	274	0	243	0	1,225
Santiago	510,734	7.3%	15,500	924	12,379	430,788	504	247	677	0	7,148
O'Higgins	30,686	3.4%	514	297	378	27,250	45	0	0	215	225
Maule	22,421	2.2%	432	19	0	19,293	20	58	0	0	216
Biobío	111,130	5.4%	1,287	295	197	104,582	142	0	158	0	68
Araucanía	312,855	32.3%	818	0	401	308,143	108	0	191	0	291
Los Ríos	81,835	22.2%	246	0	27	80,211	0	0	373	0	101
Los Lagos	210,044	24.9%	1,009	115	205	207,091	135	0	310	0	349
Aisén	26,926	26.6%	323	71	98	25,832	68	32	275	81	48
Magallanes	30,307	20.2%	158	74	0	28,685	0	0	1,063	120	69
Chile	1,631,162	9.4%	120,621	2,553	30,096	1,321,717	23,327	12,579	3,498	871	50,653

Source: Ministry of Social Development of Chile's 2013 Casen Survey.
^{a} Easter Island—where the majority of the Rapanui people live—was not included in the survey.

=== By foreign nationals ===
Chilean regions by number of foreign nationals and country/area of citizenship in 2017.

Region	Foreign nationals	% of regional population	Venezuela	Peru	Colombia	Haiti	Bolivia	South America	Caribbean	Europe	North America	Asia	Central America	Africa	Unspecified	No answer
Arica and Parinacota	10,539	6.5%	347	3,473	1,012	0	5,222	10,385	86	24	0	17	0	0	0	27
Tarapacá	41,013	11.8%	1,142	15,608	2,883	504	16,610	38,379	1,649	252	251	410	72	0	0	0
Antofagasta	31,548	5.4%	1,200	5,413	10,023	0	12,217	30,573	0	110	112	385	11	0	0	357
Atacama	4,772	1.7%	135	641	2,189	0	943	4,599	80	58	35	0	0	0	0	0
Coquimbo	9,835	1.3%	1,190	1,037	2,496	2,645	129	6,518	2,842	224	251	0	0	0	0	0
Valparaíso	31,278	1.7%	7,526	2,982	3,871	5,468	440	19,413	6,186	4,830	354	152	303	40	0	0
Santiago	526,998	7.3%	157,856	128,965	84,078	59,009	10,077	421,235	75,788	19,285	5,626	2,547	1,710	623	81	103
O'Higgins	11,832	1.3%	3,770	2,035	900	1,247	880	8,435	2,146	968	67	0	0	48	39	129
Maule	8,550	0.8%	1,577	150	706	1,675	364	4,125	2,628	1,305	117	207	168	0	0	0
Ñuble	2,838	0.6%	761	43	11	905	200	1,430	905	239	191	0	73	0	0	0
Biobío	12,321	0.8%	2,662	2,054	2,499	1,525	261	9,425	1,938	640	110	93	115	0	0	0
Araucanía	5,112	0.5%	457	313	1,149	874	103	3,216	955	617	58	42	0	0	0	224
Los Ríos	2,112	0.6%	188	136	124	172	0	1,321	302	423	0	66	0	0	0	0
Los Lagos	6,549	0.7%	880	191	925	1,514	0	3,780	1,514	899	356	0	0	0	0	0
Aisén	1,836	1.7%	216	138	602	0	31	1,578	108	122	28	0	0	0	0	0
Magallanes	4,380	2.9%	150	74	1,846	252	0	3,477	733	155	0	15	0	0	0	0
Chile	711,513	4.0%	180,057	163,253	115,314	75,790	47,477	567,889	97,860	30,151	7,556	3,934	2,452	711	120	840

Source: Ministry of Social Development of Chile's 2017 Casen Survey.

== Economy ==
=== By regional GDP (PPP) ===
Chilean regions by their 2014 regional gross domestic product at purchasing power parity in billions of 2014 international dollars.

Region	GDP (PPP)
Arica and Parinacota	2.315
Tarapacá	9.076
Antofagasta	38.886
Atacama	8.595
Coquimbo	11.237
Valparaíso	30.758
Santiago	175.108
O'Higgins	16.376
Maule	10.998
Biobío	26.428
Araucanía	8.238
Los Ríos	4.703
Los Lagos	11.131
Aisén	2.131
Magallanes	3.021
Chile	393.062

Sources: Central Bank of Chile (Chile's 2014 Regional GDP in current prices), accessed on 9 April 2016. OECD's OECD.Stat (Chile's 2014 PPP conversion factor for GDP (375.432372)), accessed on 9 April 2016. World Bank's World Development Indicators (2014 GDP (PPP) for world countries), accessed on 9 April 2016.
Notes: The aggregate Regional GDP is less than the National GDP because it does not include extra-regio GDP, VAT taxes and import duties.

=== By regional GDP (PPP) per capita ===
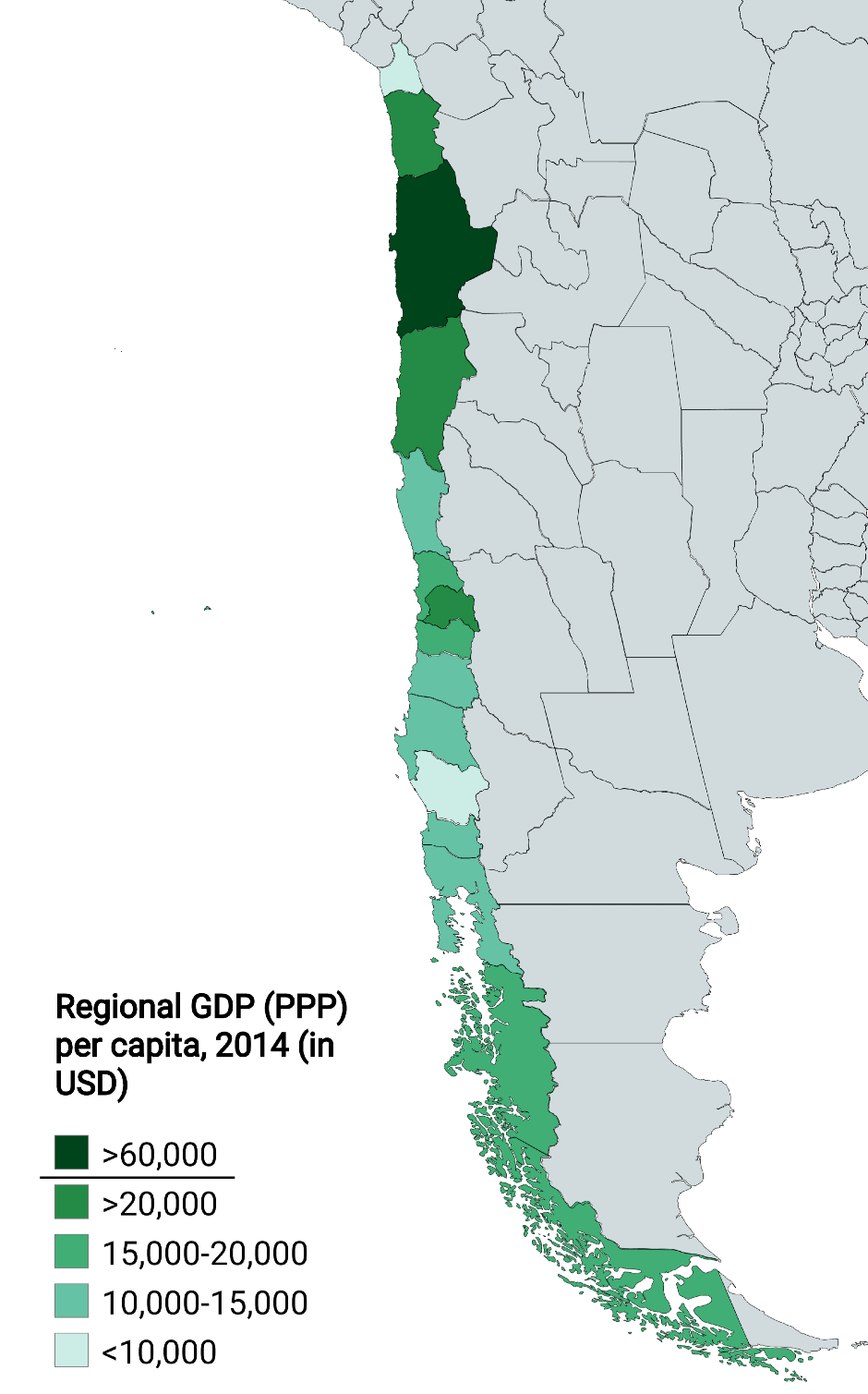
Map of the Chilean regions by GDP capita in 2014. It did not include the Ñuble Region, which was founded on 2018

Chilean regions by their 2014 regional gross domestic product per capita at purchasing power parity in 2014 international dollars.

Region	GDP (PPP) per capita
Arica and Parinacota	9,848
Tarapacá	27,604
Antofagasta	63,402
Atacama	27,882
Coquimbo	14,800
Valparaíso	17,009
Santiago	24,224
O'Higgins	17,985
Maule	10,620
Biobío	12,582
Araucanía	8,376
Los Ríos	11,711
Los Lagos	13,335
Aisén	19,851
Magallanes	18,447
Chile	22,059

Sources: Central Bank of Chile (Chile's 2014 Regional GDP in current prices), accessed on 9 April 2016. National Statistics Office of Chile (Chile's 2014 national and regional population), accessed on 9 April 2016. OECD's OECD.Stat (Chile's 2014 PPP conversion factor for GDP (375.432372)), accessed on 9 April 2016. World Bank's World Development Indicators (2014 GDP (PPP) per capita for world countries), accessed on 9 April 2016.

=== By main economic activity ===
Chilean regions by their principal economic activity in 2014.

Region	Main economic activity	% of regional GDP
Arica and Parinacota	Personal services	19.90
Tarapacá	Mining	44.84
Antofagasta	Mining	56.30
Atacama	Mining	44.33
Coquimbo	Mining	35.00
Valparaíso	Manufacturing industry	18.31
Santiago	Business and financial services	35.32
O'Higgins	Mining	23.68
Maule	Manufacturing industry	15.90
Biobío	Manufacturing industry	23.83
Araucanía	Personal services	22.14
Los Ríos	Manufacturing industry	24.03
Los Lagos	Manufacturing industry	20.27
Aisén	Public administration	19.66
Magallanes	Public administration	16.71
Chile	Business and financial services	18.41

Source: Central Bank of Chile (Chile's 2014 National and Regional GDP in current prices by economic activity), accessed on 9 April 2016.

=== By average net salary ===
Chilean regions by their average annual net salary in 2014 in international dollars.

Region	Net salary
Arica and Parinacota	10,467
Tarapacá	15,003
Antofagasta	17,870
Atacama	13,777
Coquimbo	11,704
Valparaíso	13,791
Santiago	15,321
O'Higgins	10,586
Maule	9,682
Biobío	10,710
Araucanía	9,885
Los Ríos	10,096
Los Lagos	12,543
Aisén	13,726
Magallanes	18,172
Chile	13,442

Sources: National Statistics Office of Chile's 2014 New Supplementary Income Survey (mean income of the employed, both sexes in sheet "CUADRO 8 Y 9"). OECD's StatExtracts database (2014 PPP for private consumption), accessed on 9 April 2016.
Notes: Income is from worker's main occupation only. The data was multiplied by 12 and divided by the 2014 PPP rate for private consumption (422.485238).

=== By household income per capita ===
Chilean regions by their annual household income per capita in international dollars in 2013.

Region	Mean	Median	Mean^{a}	Median^{a}
Arica and Parinacota	5,253	3,811	6,447	4,937
Tarapacá	7,111	4,828	8,537	5,969
Antofagasta	8,324	5,513	10,172	7,183
Atacama	6,527	4,669	8,028	6,074
Coquimbo	5,412	4,033	6,426	5,017
Valparaíso	6,231	4,267	7,375	5,133
Santiago	8,501	4,940	9,971	6,038
O'Higgins	5,469	4,021	6,387	4,771
Maule	5,027	3,519	5,748	4,117
Biobío	4,810	3,445	5,673	4,189
Araucanía	4,779	3,206	5,556	3,881
Los Ríos	4,996	3,344	5,991	4,196
Los Lagos	5,427	3,628	6,395	4,448
Aisén	7,315	4,815	8,724	6,021
Magallanes	7,587	5,237	9,354	6,918
Chile	6,789	4,246	7,999	5,177

Sources: Ministry of Social Development of Chile's 2013 Casen Survey (monetary and total monthly income per capita). OECD's StatExtracts database (2013 PPP rate for private consumption), accessed on 12 March 2016.
Notes: Except where noted, income is monetary household income (self-generated income plus government cash transfers). Data exclude live-in domestic workers and their family. The regional monthly monetary household income per capita (Ingreso monetario per cápita) was multiplied by 12 and divided by the PPP rate for private consumption for 2013 (409.095618).
^{a} Income includes owner-imputed rent income.

Region	Mean
Arica and Parinacota	6,752
Tarapacá	8,759
Antofagasta	10,353
Atacama	8,285
Coquimbo	6,780
Valparaíso	8,192
Santiago	9,531
O'Higgins	6,403
Maule	5,676
Biobío	5,924
Araucanía	5,848
Los Ríos	6,578
Los Lagos	7,073
Aisén	9,043
Magallanes	12,486
Chile	8,043

Sources: National Statistics Office of Chile's 2013 New Supplementary Income Survey (mean income per capita in sheet "CUADRO 3"). OECD's StatExtracts database (2013 PPP rate for private consumption), accessed on 12 March 2016.
Notes: The data was multiplied by 12 and divided by the 2013 PPP rate for private consumption (409.095618). Data exclude cash and non-cash transfers in education. Data also exclude live-in domestic workers and their family.

=== By household income inequality ===
Chilean regions by their household income inequality in 2013 as measured by the Gini coefficient.

Includes owner-imputed rent income
Region	Gini coefficient (per capita income)	Gini coefficient (equivalised income)
Arica and Parinacota	0.385	0.350
Tarapacá	0.415	0.392
Antofagasta	0.417	0.382
Atacama	0.388	0.349
Coquimbo	0.390	0.369
Valparaíso	0.435	0.410
Santiago	0.489	0.456
O'Higgins	0.397	0.372
Maule	0.403	0.377
Biobío	0.400	0.375
Araucanía	0.432	0.414
Los Ríos	0.427	0.403
Los Lagos	0.423	0.399
Aisén	0.428	0.392
Magallanes	0.400	0.371
Chile	0.465	0.436

Source: Ministry of Social Development of Chile's 2013 Casen Survey (monthly total income per capita).
Note: Persons are ranked by either household income per capita or equivalised household income (household income is divided by the square root of household size). Income is monthly total household income (self-generated income plus government cash transfers plus owner-imputed rent income). Live-in domestic workers and their family are not included.

Excludes owner-imputed rent income
Region	Gini coefficient (per capita income)	Gini coefficient (equivalised income)
Arica and Parinacota	0.424	0.399
Tarapacá	0.448	0.429
Antofagasta	0.457	0.429
Atacama	0.421	0.393
Coquimbo	0.416	0.400
Valparaíso	0.457	0.436
Santiago	0.514	0.486
O'Higgins	0.413	0.393
Maule	0.422	0.402
Biobío	0.425	0.406
Araucanía	0.457	0.445
Los Ríos	0.455	0.440
Los Lagos	0.454	0.437
Aisén	0.466	0.437
Magallanes	0.441	0.422
Chile	0.488	0.465

Source: Ministry of Social Development of Chile's 2013 Casen Survey (monthly monetary income per capita).
Note: Persons are ranked by either household income per capita or equivalised household income (household income is divided by the square root of household size). Income is monthly monetary household income (self-generated income plus government cash transfers). Live-in domestic workers and their family are not included.

=== By absolute poverty rate ===
Chilean regions by percentage of the regional population living below the national poverty line.

Region	2006	2009	2011	2013
Arica and Parinacota	30.6	18.8	21.0	14.6
Tarapacá	24.0	24.9	16.4	8.2
Antofagasta	12.3	8.8	7.1	4.0
Atacama	22.3	22.2	16.3	7.3
Coquimbo	37.9	30.6	26.1	16.2
Valparaíso	30.6	24.4	24.5	15.6
Santiago	20.2	17.6	15.7	9.2
O'Higgins	32.6	25.8	19.4	16.0
Maule	43.9	38.8	32.5	22.3
Biobío	41.3	35.1	32.3	22.3
Araucanía	48.5	48.5	39.7	27.9
Los Ríos	45.3	37.7	32.0	23.1
Los Lagos	29.3	29.0	27.0	17.6
Aisén	23.0	20.3	13.3	6.8
Magallanes	12.8	10.3	7.0	5.6
Chile	29.1	25.3	22.2	14.4

Source: 2013 Casen Survey, Ministry of Social Development of Chile.
Note: A household is below the national poverty line if its monthly total income (self-generated income plus government cash transfers plus owner-imputed rent income) divided by its household size to the power of 0.7 is below CLP$136,911 (in November 2013 prices). The consumption patterns used to construct the poverty line are from 2011 to 2012. Live-in domestic workers and their family are not included.

=== By relative poverty rate ===
Chilean regions by percentage of regional population living below 40%, 50% and 60% of regional median equivalised income. Data are for 2011.

Region	Median income (Intl. $)	Below 40% of median income	Below 50% of median income	Below 60% of median income
Arica and Parinacota	7,420	9.3%	17.8%	24.9%
Tarapacá	9,235	13.0%	18.6%	25.9%
Antofagasta	11,246	10.4%	16.1%	24.0%
Atacama	8,708	13.7%	19.3%	25.7%
Coquimbo	7,125	9.6%	16.7%	23.1%
Valparaíso	7,045	10.2%	16.4%	23.6%
Santiago	8,909	11.0%	17.4%	24.0%
O'Higgins	7,688	9.2%	16.2%	22.4%
Maule	6,149	6.8%	13.4%	22.0%
Biobío	6,082	9.4%	15.4%	23.0%
Araucanía	5,473	11.1%	16.2%	24.4%
Los Ríos	6,205	9.1%	14.9%	22.9%
Los Lagos	6,532	9.3%	14.7%	22.3%
Aisén	9,066	12.4%	18.8%	25.2%
Magallanes	9,927	10.0%	16.2%	24.2%
Chile	7,688	10.7%	17.6%	24.7%

Sources: Ministry of Social Development of Chile's Casen Survey 2011 (monthly monetary income); OECD's StatExtracts database (2011 PPP for actual individual consumption).
Notes: Income is the median of monthly household monetary income (self-generated income plus government cash transfers) divided by the square root of household size, excluding live-in domestic workers and their family. The result is multiplied by 12 and divided by the "PPP for actual individual consumption" for 2011 (425.368652) to obtain annual income in International dollars.

== Health ==
=== By average lifespan ===
Chilean regions by the average lifespan (age of death) in years in 2002. This should not be confused with life expectancy.

Region	Men	Women	Total
Arica and Parinacota + Tarapacá	61.0	67.7	63.8
Antofagasta	60.6	67.8	63.7
Atacama	64.4	69.1	66.4
Coquimbo	65.5	70.2	67.6
Valparaíso	66.7	72.5	69.4
Santiago	63.8	67.4	65.5
O'Higgins	64.1	69.3	66.3
Maule	64.6	71.4	67.5
Biobío	63.1	70.1	66.1
Araucanía	63.9	71.1	67.0
Los Ríos + Los Lagos	62.6	69.4	65.5
Aisén	56.2	62.4	58.5
Magallanes	63.3	71.4	66.6
Chile	63.8	70.9	67.2

Source: "Demografía: Ganancias en años de vida y riesgo de muerte, 1992-2002." National Statistics Office.

=== By life expectancy ===
Chilean regions by life expectancy at birth, by sex, in 2015.

Region	Men (years)	Women (years)
Arica and Parinacota	77.03	81.36
Tarapacá	76.66	81.49
Antofagasta	75.73	80.21
Atacama	77.04	81.47
Coquimbo	77.46	82.51
Valparaíso	76.48	81.61
Santiago	76.92	82.13
O'Higgins	76.69	81.35
Maule	75.99	80.92
Biobío	76.24	81.42
Araucanía	75.98	81.12
Los Ríos	75.55	80.77
Los Lagos	75.02	80.89
Aisén	75.08	81.55
Magallanes	75.26	80.87
Chile	76.52	81.69

Source: "Enfoque demográfico de género, July 2015," National Statistics Office.

== Education ==
=== By literacy rate ===
Chilean regions by literacy rate in persons over 15 years of age.

Region	2009	2011	2013
Arica and Parinacota	98.7	98.6	97.5
Tarapacá	97.8	98.8	98.8
Antofagasta	98.4	98.9	98.1
Atacama	97.7	97.2	96.5
Coquimbo	96.2	96.4	96.5
Valparaíso	97.6	97.5	97.5
Santiago	98.2	98.2	97.4
O'Higgins	94.0	94.7	94.0
Maule	92.3	92.3	92.7
Biobío	94.8	95.0	94.8
Araucanía	93.1	94.6	93.9
Los Ríos	94.7	94.7	94.8
Los Lagos	94.8	95.4	94.6
Aisén	95.6	95.5	94.9
Magallanes	97.9	98.4	97.1
Chile	96.5	96.7	96.2

Sources: Casen Survey 2009, 2011, and 2013, Ministry of Social Development of Chile.

=== By mean years of schooling ===
Chilean regions by the average years of school completed successfully in persons over 15 years of age in 2011.

Region	Men	Women	Total
Arica and Parinacota	11.0	10.7	10.9
Tarapacá	11.1	10.8	10.9
Antofagasta	11.5	11.0	11.2
Atacama	10.4	10.1	10.2
Coquimbo	10.3	10.1	10.1
Valparaíso	11.0	10.7	10.8
Santiago	11.4	11.1	11.2
O'Higgins	9.9	9.6	9.7
Maule	9.0	9.1	9.1
Biobío	9.9	9.7	9.8
Araucanía	9.3	9.3	9.3
Los Ríos	9.9	9.6	9.7
Los Lagos	9.5	9.2	9.3
Aisén	9.9	9.9	9.9
Magallanes	11.1	10.5	10.8
Chile	10.6	10.4	10.5

Source: Casen Survey 2011, Ministry of Social Development of Chile.

=== By level of educational attainment ===
Chilean regions by highest level of educational attainment in persons over 15 years of age in 2011.

Region	No formal education	Incomplete primary	Complete primary	Incomplete secondary	Complete secondary	Incomplete tertiary	Complete tertiary	Complete primary or more	Complete secondary or more
Arica and Parinacota	1.6%	11.1%	8.3%	23.4%	33.2%	10.6%	11.9%	87.3%	55.7%
Tarapacá	1.8%	9.0%	10.5%	22.1%	36.1%	10.0%	10.4%	89.1%	56.5%
Antofagasta	1.5%	7.7%	9.2%	22.7%	34.0%	11.3%	13.5%	90.8%	58.8%
Atacama	3.6%	12.5%	11.7%	23.4%	30.9%	8.6%	9.3%	83.9%	48.8%
Coquimbo	3.2%	14.8%	11.7%	21.1%	29.7%	9.7%	9.8%	82.0%	49.2%
Valparaíso	2.7%	11.8%	10.1%	19.5%	29.0%	13.0%	13.9%	85.5%	55.9%
Santiago	2.0%	10.4%	9.1%	20.3%	29.8%	12.2%	16.3%	87.6%	58.2%
O'Higgins	4.0%	19.7%	11.3%	20.1%	26.4%	8.7%	9.8%	76.3%	44.9%
Maule	5.3%	23.6%	14.6%	18.5%	24.0%	6.8%	7.2%	71.1%	38.0%
Biobío	3.7%	19.0%	11.2%	21.4%	25.9%	8.7%	10.1%	77.3%	44.7%
Araucanía	5.6%	22.3%	12.2%	19.5%	23.0%	8.0%	9.3%	72.1%	40.3%
Los Ríos	4.0%	20.1%	12.5%	19.2%	25.2%	9.4%	9.6%	75.8%	44.1%
Los Lagos	3.4%	22.1%	15.4%	20.1%	23.7%	7.3%	8.1%	74.5%	39.1%
Aisén	4.4%	17.7%	13.5%	20.4%	23.2%	7.3%	13.5%	78.0%	44.0%
Magallanes	1.3%	12.1%	12.1%	19.7%	29.0%	11.5%	14.2%	86.6%	54.7%
Chile	3.0%	14.5%	10.7%	20.4%	28.2%	10.5%	12.8%	82.6%	51.6%

Source: Casen Survey 2011, Ministry of Social Development of Chile.

=== By net enrollment ratio in education ===
Chilean regions by net enrollment ratio in education in 2011.

Region	Preschool (0–5 years)	Primary (6–13 years)	Secondary (14–17 years)	Tertiary (18–24 years)
Arica and Parinacota	42.92	91.17	76.65	38.67
Tarapacá	47.51	94.52	70.82	28.16
Antofagasta	38.13	91.90	70.78	28.26
Atacama	38.14	94.13	73.93	23.01
Coquimbo	47.43	93.00	68.95	33.89
Valparaíso	50.23	91.37	71.63	42.96
Santiago	43.15	92.38	72.91	35.03
O'Higgins	41.89	95.41	63.00	28.60
Maule	43.38	93.10	67.49	26.31
Biobío	40.76	93.45	71.83	31.62
Araucanía	45.49	93.40	73.25	29.55
Los Ríos	38.49	94.18	69.83	33.88
Los Lagos	40.42	92.88	71.43	25.78
Aisén	52.28	94.39	69.30	22.42
Magallanes	51.16	94.40	72.50	43.87
Chile	43.50	92.84	71.39	33.86

Sources: Casen Survey 2011, Ministry of Social Development of Chile.
Note: Data exclude special education.

=== By gross enrollment ratio in education ===
Chilean regions by gross enrollment ratio in education in 2011.

Region	Preschool	Primary	Secondary	Tertiary
Arica and Parinacota	47.75	100.11	92.17	44.84
Tarapacá	53.52	106.56	83.20	37.14
Antofagasta	45.20	101.59	97.82	35.93
Atacama	44.36	103.74	94.51	28.65
Coquimbo	53.90	102.30	86.39	41.16
Valparaíso	58.52	102.30	97.58	58.41
Santiago	51.15	103.29	91.23	50.56
O'Higgins	47.93	112.65	78.90	44.71
Maule	51.17	107.41	86.45	33.08
Biobío	46.54	107.04	90.03	41.30
Araucanía	53.87	104.05	88.60	36.92
Los Ríos	44.88	106.94	85.72	43.84
Los Lagos	48.88	107.33	92.73	34.09
Aisén	58.69	107.66	91.49	31.23
Magallanes	58.03	106.07	86.08	59.49
Chile	50.93	104.69	90.33	45.82

Sources: Casen Survey 2011, Ministry of Social Development of Chile.
Note: Data exclude special education.

== Basic services ==
=== By access to drinking water ===
Chilean regions by population living in homes with access to drinking water in 2011, by source.

Region	Public supply network	Water well or noria	River, slope, lake or stream	Water truck	Other source
Arica and Parinacota	96.2%	1.4%	0.7%	1.5%	0.2%
Tarapacá	96.4%	0.4%	1.2%	1.3%	0.6%
Antofagasta	99.3%	0.0%	0.1%	0.4%	0.3%
Atacama	96.2%	0.3%	0.6%	2.9%	0.1%
Coquimbo	96.5%	1.5%	0.9%	0.9%	0.3%
Valparaíso	96.5%	1.7%	0.2%	0.7%	1.0%
Santiago	99.0%	0.5%	0.2%	0.1%	0.2%
O'Higgins	96.9%	2.2%	0.3%	0.4%	0.2%
Maule	89.2%	7.8%	2.4%	0.2%	0.3%
Biobío	88.5%	8.5%	2.2%	0.1%	0.6%
Araucanía	75.8%	15.0%	7.6%	1.1%	0.5%
Los Ríos	78.3%	10.3%	10.8%	0.3%	0.3%
Los Lagos	82.2%	11.4%	4.5%	0.1%	1.9%
Aisén	92.6%	1.0%	6.3%	0.0%	0.1%
Magallanes	98.3%	0.9%	0.3%	0.0%	0.4%
Chile	94.0%	3.7%	1.5%	0.4%	0.5%

Source: Casen Survey 2011, Ministry of Social Development of Chile.

=== By access to sewage treatment ===
Chilean regions by population living in homes with access to house sewage treatment in 2011, by type.

Region	Sanitary sewer	Septic tank	Dry well	Other	None
Arica and Parinacota	91.8%	4.2%	3.8%	0.0%	0.2%
Tarapacá	96.0%	1.5%	2.1%	0.0%	0.4%
Antofagasta	98.2%	0.9%	0.7%	0.0%	0.2%
Atacama	94.0%	3.2%	2.4%	0.0%	0.3%
Coquimbo	86.4%	8.1%	5.2%	0.1%	0.2%
Valparaíso	90.2%	7.7%	1.7%	0.2%	0.2%
Santiago	96.8%	2.2%	0.7%	0.0%	0.3%
O'Higgins	70.2%	22.1%	7.0%	0.0%	0.6%
Maule	73.0%	17.3%	8.3%	0.2%	1.2%
Biobío	82.6%	10.7%	6.1%	0.1%	0.4%
Araucanía	70.5%	10.8%	18.2%	0.2%	0.3%
Los Ríos	69.5%	20.5%	9.4%	0.0%	0.5%
Los Lagos	72.6%	9.4%	17.1%	0.1%	0.8%
Aisén	89.5%	6.6%	3.8%	0.0%	0.1%
Magallanes	97.8%	1.3%	0.8%	0.0%	0.1%
Chile	87.9%	7.2%	4.5%	0.1%	0.4%

Source: Casen Survey 2011, Ministry of Social Development of Chile.

=== By access to electricity ===
Chilean regions by population living in homes with access to electricity in 2011, by source.

Region	Public network	Own/community generator	Solar panel	Other source	None
Arica and Parinacota	98.2%	0.8%	0.1%	0.5%	0.5%
Tarapacá	98.5%	0.9%	0.0%	0.1%	0.4%
Antofagasta	98.3%	0.6%	0.0%	0.1%	0.9%
Atacama	98.0%	0.9%	0.3%	0.1%	0.7%
Coquimbo	98.7%	0.1%	0.5%	0.1%	0.5%
Valparaíso	99.1%	0.0%	0.0%	0.7%	0.1%
Santiago	99.9%	0.0%	0.0%	0.1%	0.0%
O'Higgins	99.4%	0.1%	0.0%	0.2%	0.3%
Maule	99.3%	0.1%	0.0%	0.1%	0.5%
Biobío	99.3%	0.1%	0.0%	0.3%	0.4%
Araucanía	98.2%	0.2%	0.0%	0.4%	1.2%
Los Ríos	99.1%	0.1%	0.0%	0.1%	0.7%
Los Lagos	97.6%	1.3%	0.0%	0.4%	0.6%
Aisén	98.5%	0.4%	0.1%	0.2%	0.8%
Magallanes	99.5%	0.3%	0.0%	0.1%	0.1%
Chile	99.3%	0.2%	0.0%	0.2%	0.3%

Source: Casen Survey 2011, Ministry of Social Development of Chile.

== Ownership ==
=== By ownership of goods and services ===
Chilean regions by percentage of households owning at least one car, an automatic washing machine, a refrigerator, a water heater, a fixed telephone line, a mobile phone and subscribed to cable/satellite television in 2011.

Region	Vehicle	Automatic washing machine	Refrigerator	Water heater	Fixed telephone line	Mobile phone	Cable/Sat. TV connection
Arica and Parinacota	36.3%	66.7%	77.2%	39.0%	44.2%	94.1%	45.1%
Tarapacá	32.0%	60.9%	67.1%	35.4%	40.5%	93.3%	39.6%
Antofagasta	32.5%	68.5%	74.1%	57.8%	57.4%	95.6%	58.5%
Atacama	28.3%	61.9%	77.2%	56.5%	39.6%	95.4%	39.9%
Coquimbo	28.8%	61.6%	77.1%	58.4%	28.5%	95.3%	33.6%
Valparaíso	26.6%	71.3%	82.2%	71.0%	45.9%	92.5%	47.7%
Santiago	29.7%	73.2%	80.6%	70.9%	57.0%	93.6%	39.9%
O'Higgins	31.0%	69.7%	82.3%	66.2%	27.0%	95.6%	47.7%
Maule	27.3%	66.6%	79.6%	50.4%	16.1%	95.3%	30.5%
Biobío	25.6%	72.0%	79.9%	42.2%	32.2%	94.5%	42.5%
Araucanía	25.4%	66.7%	75.7%	38.9%	26.2%	92.7%	29.3%
Los Ríos	24.7%	71.2%	77.9%	36.9%	29.5%	94.1%	38.7%
Los Lagos	26.4%	73.6%	81.1%	36.1%	24.6%	95.3%	42.3%
Aisén	39.2%	83.2%	86.2%	57.3%	24.6%	93.9%	51.5%
Magallanes	45.5%	74.3%	84.0%	79.1%	56.9%	92.8%	54.7%
Chile	28.7%	70.8%	79.8%	59.8%	42.7%	94.0%	41.0%

Source: Casen Survey 2011, Ministry of Social Development of Chile.
Note: Data refer to family nucleus, except "mobile phone" and "fixed telephone line" data, which refer to households.

=== By computer ownership and Internet access ===
Chilean regions by personal computer ownership and Internet access in 2011.

Although only households with personal computers were asked if they had Internet access, the percentages shown here for both indicators are in relation to the total households in each region.

Region	At least one computer in the household	Internet access
Arica and Parinacota	46.6%	35.3%
Tarapacá	42.9%	34.6%
Antofagasta	54.0%	44.6%
Atacama	43.0%	30.4%
Coquimbo	39.7%	29.8%
Valparaíso	47.2%	34.8%
Santiago	49.5%	39.8%
O'Higgins	42.3%	28.1%
Maule	32.7%	20.0%
Biobío	40.2%	26.8%
Araucanía	32.9%	20.9%
Los Ríos	38.3%	26.7%
Los Lagos	37.3%	27.0%
Aisén	48.8%	35.8%
Magallanes	55.7%	39.2%
Chile	44.5%	33.4%

Source: Casen Survey 2011, Ministry of Social Development of Chile.
Note: Data exclude mobile phone Internet access.

=== By mobile phone ownership ===
Chilean regions by population over the age of 15 owning a mobile phone in 2011.

Region	% of regional population over 15
Arica and Parinacota	90.7%
Tarapacá	93.4%
Antofagasta	97.4%
Atacama	97.4%
Coquimbo	93.9%
Valparaíso	90.9%
Santiago	90.1%
O'Higgins	94.5%
Maule	95.1%
Biobío	90.8%
Araucanía	90.1%
Los Ríos	92.3%
Los Lagos	93.4%
Aisén	97.3%
Magallanes	93.4%
Chile	91.6%

Source: Casen Survey 2011, Ministry of Social Development of Chile.

== By electorate ==
Chilean regions by population registered to vote in the 28 October 2012 municipal election as of 30 June 2012 (registration deadline). Please note that Chileans born in Chile are automatically enrolled.

Region	Enrolled men	Enrolled women	Enrolled total	Men of voting age	Women of voting age	Voting age population	E/VAP ratio Men	E/VAP ratio Women	E/VAP ratio Total
Arica and Parinacota	86,777	83,744	170,521	61,482	69,090	130,572	141.1%	121.2%	130.6%
Tarapacá	110,862	105,991	216,853	123,726	112,390	236,116	89.6%	94.3%	91.8%
Antofagasta	207,865	204,518	412,383	220,600	199,989	420,590	94.2%	102.3%	98.0%
Atacama	110,406	108,717	219,123	103,866	99,277	203,143	106.3%	109.5%	107.9%
Coquimbo	257,793	270,799	528,592	264,626	275,644	540,270	97.4%	98.2%	97.8%
Valparaíso	703,110	752,801	1,455,911	655,608	693,352	1,348,960	107.2%	108.6%	107.9%
Santiago	2,508,422	2,743,434	5,251,856	2,503,209	2,700,807	5,204,016	100.2%	101.6%	100.9%
O'Higgins	341,873	348,904	690,777	333,154	329,673	662,826	102.6%	105.8%	104.2%
Maule	393,346	407,300	800,646	371,827	382,371	754,199	105.8%	106.5%	106.2%
Biobío	789,249	837,039	1,626,288	740,687	780,951	1,521,638	106.6%	107.2%	106.9%
Araucanía	396,403	409,163	805,566	349,552	364,606	714,158	113.4%	112.2%	112.8%
Los Ríos	158,554	162,596	321,150	138,550	142,148	280,698	114.4%	114.4%	114.4%
Los Lagos	327,881	333,800	661,681	316,363	306,929	623,292	103.6%	108.8%	106.2%
Aisén	47,425	42,583	90,008	40,412	35,537	75,950	117.4%	119.8%	118.5%
Magallanes	81,474	71,255	152,729	63,257	56,295	119,552	128.8%	126.6%	127.8%
Chile	6,521,440	6,882,644	13,404,084	6,286,920	6,549,060	12,835,981	103.7%	105.1%	104.4%

Note: "E/VAP ratio" is "Enrolled" divided by "Voting Age Population" multiplied by 100. The electoral roll includes all Chileans and foreigners (5-year residence) over the age of 18 on election day (28 October 2012) whose right to vote has not been suspended. The National Statistics Office provides population data estimated for June 30 of each year disaggregated by age. Linear interpolation was applied to obtain the population for election day (28 October 2012).
Sources: National Statistics Office (Chile's population), Electoral Service (electorate).

== By prison inmates and incarceration rate ==
Chilean regions by prison inmates and incarceration rate as of November 30, 2010.

Region	Prison inmates Men	Prison inmates Women	Prison inmates Total	Incarceration rate Male	Incarceration rate Female	Incarceration rate Total
Arica and Parinacota	1,883	384	2,267	2,096	404	1,226
Tarapacá	2,247	391	2,638	1,376	259	839
Antofagasta	2,181	214	2,395	728	78	416
Atacama	1,093	153	1,246	763	111	444
Coquimbo	2,049	139	2,188	576	38	304
Valparaíso	5,120	444	5,564	591	50	316
Santiago	19,299	2,225	21,524	575	63	313
O'Higgins	2,498	195	2,693	561	45	305
Maule	2,091	113	2,204	416	22	219
Biobío	3,739	253	3,992	373	24	196
Araucanía	2,395	104	2,499	498	21	258
Los Ríos	1,185	36	1,221	625	19	322
Los Lagos	1,908	69	1,977	449	17	236
Aisén	201	5	206	364	10	196
Magallanes	336	9	345	403	12	217
Chile	48,225	4,734	52,959	570	55	310

Note: Incarceration rate is number of inmates per 100,000 inhabitants.
Sources: Chilean Gendarmerie (prison inmates), National Statistics Office (Chile's population as of June 30, 2010), International Centre for Prison Studies, accessed on December 9, 2010 (country comparison).

== By national HDI ==
Chilean regions by their human development index. This is an HDI constructed for Chile and it is not comparable to HDIs for other countries.

Region	1990	2003
Arica and Parinacota + Tarapacá	0.740	0.775
Antofagasta	0.698	0.776
Atacama	0.710	0.768
Coquimbo	0.665	0.761
Valparaíso	0.689	0.769
Santiago	0.726	0.812
O'Higgins	0.658	0.736
Maule	0.624	0.720
Biobío	0.628	0.735
Araucanía	0.612	0.717
Los Ríos + Los Lagos	0.632	0.721
Aisén	0.652	0.742
Magallanes	0.712	0.788
Chile	0.694	0.773

Source: "Desarrollo Humano en Chile - El poder: ¿para qué y para quién?." United Nations Development Programme, 2004.

== By international HDI ==
Map of the Chilean regions by HDI in 2017. > 0.800 0.700 – 0.800 No data

Below is a list of the Chilean regions by Human Development Index as of 2022, which is a comparative measure of life expectancy, literacy, education, standard of living and overall well-being of the citizens in each states.

Rank	Region	HDI (2022)
Very High Human Development
1	Santiago Metropolitan Region	0.890
2	Tarapaca (including Arica and Parinacota)	0.887
4	Antofagasta	0.881
5	Valparaiso	0.876
6	Magallanes and Antartica Chilena	0.872
7	Atacama	0.864
–	Chile (average)	0.860
8	Coquimbo	0.838
9	Bio Bio (includes Ñuble)	0.834
11	OHiggins	0.829
12	Aisen	0.816
13	Los Lagos (includes Los Rios)	0.803
High Human Development
15	Maule	0.798
16	Araucanía	0.795

== By population by settlement type ==
Chilean regions by their population living in cities (ciudades), towns (pueblos), villages (aldeas) and hamlets (caseríos), according to the 2002 census.

Region	Population in cities	Population in towns	Population in villages	Population in hamlets	Population in other rural areas
Arica and Parinacota + Tarapacá	396,411	6,727	5,036	7,620	12,800
Antofagasta	479,061	3,485	2,233	2,142	7,063
Atacama	226,266	6,353	5,785	7,656	8,276
Coquimbo	445,398	25,524	52,246	29,429	50,613
Valparaíso	1,362,077	47,825	50,834	27,372	51,744
Santiago	5,822,316	52,697	60,667	30,825	94,680
O'Higgins	468,309	80,275	52,246	29,429	150,368
Maule	525,530	77,490	52,246	29,429	223,402
Biobío	1,436,104	92,202	65,032	55,060	213,164
Araucanía	520,326	68,082	11,726	10,238	259,163
Los Ríos + Los Lagos	661,486	72,893	42,111	48,829	247,816
Aisén	61,786	11,821	6,838	2,777	8,270
Magallanes	132,983	6,686	1,629	2,435	7,093
Chile	12,538,053	552,060	408,629	283,241	1,334,452

Source: "Chile: Ciudades, Pueblos, Aldeas y Caseríos 2005." National Statistics Office, June 2005.

== By largest cities ==
Largest cities within a region, according to the 2002 census. In all regions, the largest city is also the regional capital.

Region	Largest city	2nd Largest	3rd Largest
Arica and Parinacota	Arica	none	none
Tarapacá	Iquique	Alto Hospicio	Pozo Almonte
Antofagasta	Antofagasta	Calama	Tocopilla
Atacama	Copiapó	Vallenar	Caldera
Coquimbo	Greater La Serena (conurbation)	Ovalle	Illapel
Valparaíso	Greater Valparaíso (conurbation)	Quillota (conurbation)	San Antonio (conurbation)
Santiago	Santiago Metropolis (conurbation)	Peñaflor (includes Malloco)	Colina (absorption and conurbation)
O'Higgins	Rancagua (conurbation)	San Fernando	Rengo
Maule	Talca (absorption)	Curicó	Linares
Biobío	Greater Concepción (conurbation)	Chillán (conurbation)	Los Ángeles
Araucanía	Greater Temuco (conurbation)	Angol	Villarrica
Los Ríos	Valdivia (absorption)	La Unión	Río Bueno
Los Lagos	Puerto Montt	Osorno	Castro
Aisén	Coihaique	Puerto Aisén	none
Magallanes	Punta Arenas	Puerto Natales	none

Source: "Chile: Ciudades, Pueblos, Aldeas y Caseríos 2005." National Statistics Office, June 2005.
