= ISO 3166-2:EC =

Entry for Ecuador in ISO 3166-2

ISO 3166-2:EC is the entry for Ecuador in ISO 3166-2, part of the ISO 3166 standard published by the International Organization for Standardization (ISO), which defines codes for the names of the principal subdivisions (e.g., provinces or states) of all countries coded in ISO 3166-1.

Currently for Ecuador, ISO 3166-2 codes are defined for 24 provinces.

Each code consists of two parts, separated by a hyphen. The first part is EC, the ISO 3166-1 alpha-2 code of Ecuador. The second part is one or two letters, currently used in vehicle registration plates, with a few exceptions.

== Current codes ==
Subdivision names are listed as in the ISO 3166-2 standard published by the ISO 3166 Maintenance Agency (ISO 3166/MA).

Click on the button in the header to sort each column.

Code	Subdivision name (es)	Subdivision name (en)
EC-A	Azuay	Azuay
EC-B	Bolívar	Bolivar
EC-F	Cañar	Canar
EC-C	Carchi	Carchi
EC-H	Chimborazo	Chimborazo
EC-X	Cotopaxi	Cotopaxi
EC-O	El Oro	The Gold
EC-E	Esmeraldas	Esmeraldas
EC-W	Galápagos	Galapagos
EC-G	Guayas	Guayas
EC-I	Imbabura	Imbabura
EC-L	Loja	Loja
EC-R	Los Ríos	The Rivers
EC-M	Manabí	Manabi
EC-S	Morona Santiago	Morona Santiago
EC-N	Napo	Napo
EC-D	Orellana	Orellana
EC-Y	Pastaza	Pastaza
EC-P	Pichincha	Pichincha
EC-SE	Santa Elena	Saint Helen
EC-SD	Santo Domingo de los Tsáchilas	Saint Dominic
EC-U	Sucumbíos	Sucumbios
EC-T	Tungurahua	Tungurahua
EC-Z	Zamora Chinchipe	Zamora Chinchipe

== Changes ==
The following changes to the entry have been announced in newsletters by the ISO 3166/MA since the first publication of ISO 3166-2 in 1998:

Newsletter	Date issued	Description of change in newsletter	Code/Subdivision change
Newsletter I-4	2002-12-10	Addition of one province	Subdivisions added: EC-D Orellana
Newsletter II-2	2010-06-30	Update of the administrative structure and of the list source	Subdivisions added: EC-SE Santa Elena; EC-SD Santo Domingo de los Tsáchilas

== See also ==
- Subdivisions of Ecuador
- FIPS region codes of Ecuador
- Neighbouring countries: CO, PE
