= Median income =

Macroeconomic indicator

The median income is the income amount that divides a population into two groups, half having an income above that amount, and half having an income below that amount. The median can be calculated for household income, personal income or disposable income.

== Measure ==
The median income differs from the national average salary or GDP per capita due to the income distribution. The median income is an economic indicator of the standard of living for the median person in a country. Median income growth correlates with consumer confidence. In line with the median voter theorem the median income growth is a democratic indicator of economic growth.

The measurement of income from individuals and households, which is necessary to produce statistics such as the median, can pose challenges and can yield results inconsistent with aggregate national accounts data. For example, an academic study on the Census income data claims that when correcting for underreporting, U.S. median gross household income was 15% higher in 2010.

== Median equivalised household disposable income ==
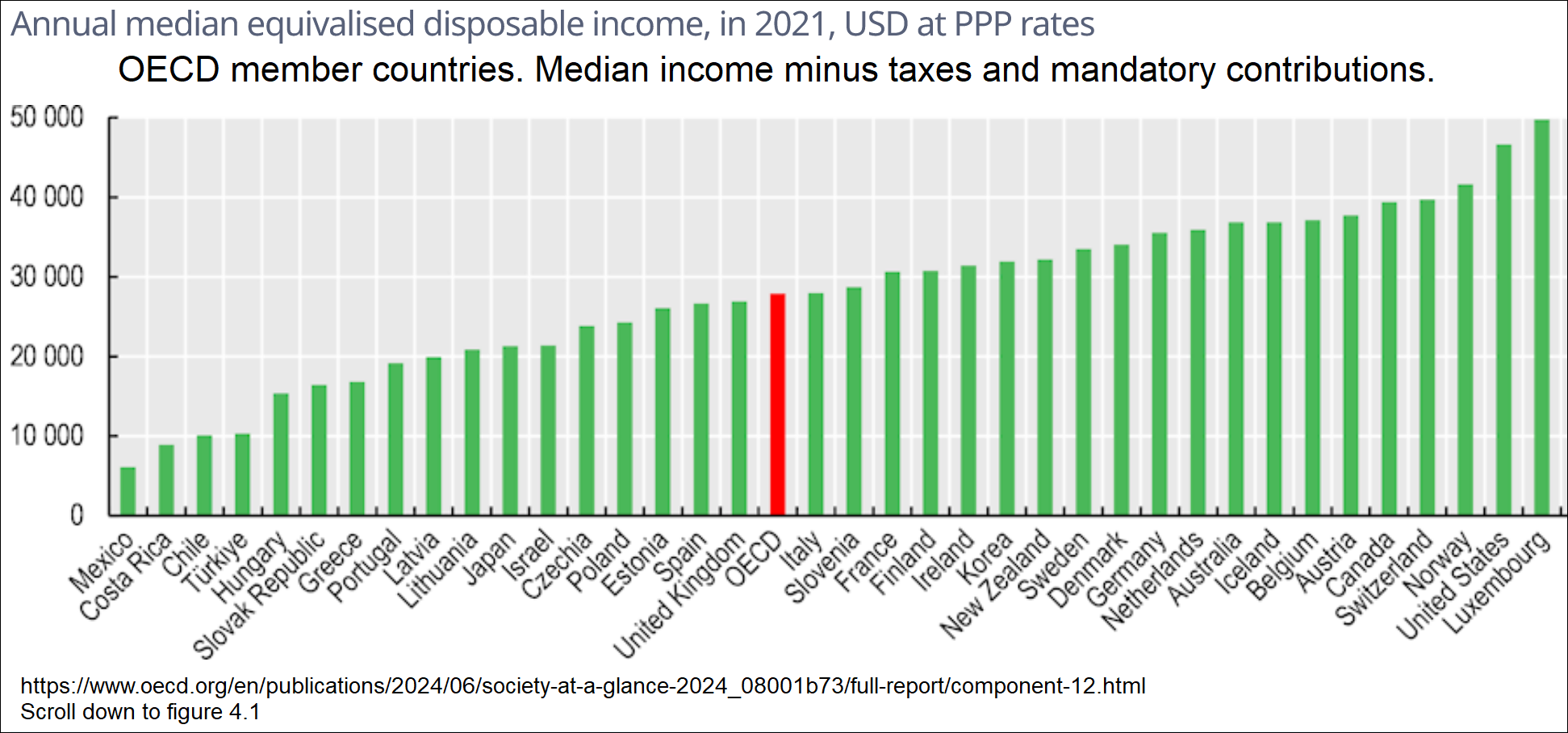
Annual median equivalised disposable income, in 2021, USD at PPP rates, by OECD country

Disposable income is market income (income from work and capital) after accounting for public cash transfers received and direct taxes and social security contributions paid. It excludes in-kind services provided to households by governments and private entities, consumption taxes, and imputed income flows due to home ownership.

The median equivalised household disposable income is the median household disposable income equivalised by dividing by the square root of household size; the square root is used to acknowledge that people sharing accommodation benefit from pooling at least some of their living costs. The median equivalised disposable income for individual countries in United States dollars, corrected for purchasing power parity (PPP) in 2021 is shown in the below tables. The top table shows figures from OECD for 2021 and the bottom table shows figures from the Luxembourg Income Study for the most recent available year between 2020-2024.

Median equivalised household disposable income (OECD)
| Location | 2021 (Int$) |
|---|---|
| Luxembourg | 49,748 |
| United States | 46,825 |
| Norway | 41,621 |
| Switzerland | 39,698 |
| Canada | 39,388 |
| Austria | 37,715 |
| Belgium | 37,110 |
| Iceland | 36,853 |
| Australia | 36,835 |
| Netherlands | 35,891 |
| Germany | 35,537 |
| Denmark | 34,061 |
| Sweden | 33,472 |
| New Zealand | 32,158 |
| South Korea | 31,882 |
| Ireland | 31,392 |
| Finland | 30,727 |
| France | 30,622 |
| Slovenia | 28,698 |
| Italy | 27,949 |
| United Kingdom | 26,884 |
| Spain | 26,630 |
| Estonia | 26,075 |
| Poland | 24,264 |
| Czech Republic | 23,802 |
| Israel | 21,366 |
| Japan | 21,282 |
| Lithuania | 20,856 |
| Latvia | 19,908 |
| Croatia | 19,680 |
| Portugal | 19,147 |
| Greece | 16,774 |
| Slovak Republic | 16,410 |
| Romania | 15,898 |
| Hungary | 15,361 |
| Bulgaria | 14,990 |
| Turkey | 10,341 |
| Chile | 10,101 |
| Costa Rica | 8,915 |
| Mexico | 6,090 |
| South Africa | 6,068 |

Median equivalised household disposable income (Luxembourg Income Study )
| Location | 2021 (Int$) | Year |
|---|---|---|
| Luxembourg | 53,747 | 2023 |
| United States | 44,871 | 2024 |
| Norway | 44,846 | 2022 |
| Switzerland | 42,737 | 2022 |
| Austria | 41,756 | 2023 |
| Canada | 40,884 | 2022 |
| Netherlands | 40,373 | 2021 |
| Australia | 38,912 | 2020 |
| Belgium | 37,873 | 2024 |
| Germany | 36,300 | 2024 |
| Denmark | 35,598 | 2022 |
| Ireland | 34,700 | 2023 |
| South Korea | 34,004 | 2021 |
| United Kingdom | 33,787 | 2024 |
| Sweden | 32,022 | 2023 |
| France | 31,551 | 2022 |
| Spain | 29,572 | 2022 |
| Japan | 27,776 | 2020 |
| Israel | 25,948 | 2022 |
| Italy | 23,299 | 2022 |
| Czechia | 22,173 | 2023 |
| Poland | 22,101 | 2023 |
| Lithuania | 20,916 | 2023 |
| Russia | 20,542 | 2021 |
| Greece | 18,384 | 2021 |
| Romania | 18,023 | 2021 |
| Bulgaria | 16,722 | 2022 |
| Uruguay | 14,010 | 2024 |
| Serbia | 10,094 | 2022 |
| Mexico | 8,940 | 2024 |
| Paraguay | 8,874 | 2023 |
| Palestine | 8,560 | 2023 |
| Brazil | 8,323 | 2022 |
| Colombia | 6,180 | 2023 |
| Peru | 5,750 | 2021 |
| Georgia | 5,713 | 2022 |
| Philippines | 5,074 | 2023 |
| South Africa | 4,733 | 2023 |
| Mali | 4,200 | 2024 |

== Median Gross Wages (LIS) ==
The Luxembourg Income Study Database (LIS) includes data on Median Gross Wages. Values are shown for the most recent year available after 2020 and are shown in US Dollars adjusted for purchasing power and 2021 price levels.

Median Gross wages
| Location | (USD PPP 2021) | (Year) |
|---|---|---|
| Luxembourg | 59,530 | 2023 |
| Switzerland | 50,084 | 2022 |
| Denmark | 48,069 | 2022 |
| Norway | 47,354 | 2022 |
| Germany | 46,751 | 2024 |
| United States | 44,918 | 2024 |
| Belgium | 42,570 | 2024 |
| Netherlands | 41,691 | 2021 |
| Australia | 41,216 | 2020 |
| Austria | 40,859 | 2023 |
| Canada | 36,132 | 2022 |
| United Kingdom | 35,673 | 2024 |
| Sweden | 35,458 | 2023 |
| France | 33,692 | 2022 |
| Ireland | 31,830 | 2023 |
| Lithuania | 28,496 | 2023 |
| Romania | 28,320 | 2021 |
| Italy | 28,158 | 2022 |
| Spain | 26,509 | 2022 |
| Israel | 25,574 | 2022 |
| Greece | 23,584 | 2021 |
| Czechia | 22,518 | 2023 |
| Russia | 18,744 | 2021 |
| Bulgaria | 15,319 | 2022 |
| South Africa | 9,721 | 2023 |
| Brazil | 8,068 | 2022 |
| Colombia | 7,929 | 2023 |
| Peru | 7,015 | 2021 |

== Median Daily Disposable Income per person ==
Map of daily median income in USD (2021 PPP, Poverty and Inequality Platform, last available year): 70–100 60–70 50–60 40–50 / 30–40 20–30 10–20 5–10 / 2–5 0–2 No data

The following table shows the daily median per person income after taxes and transfers according to the Poverty and Inequality Platform of the World Bank.

| Country | Daily median income in USD (2021 PPP) | Annual growth (%) | Year |
|---|---|---|---|
| Albania | 9.79 | 5.7 | 2018 |
| Australia | 59.90 | | 2020 |
| Austria | 71.44 | -1.7 | 2023 |
| Belgium | 62.89 | 3.0 | 2023 |
| Bolivia | 16.85 | 2.7 | 2023 |
| Brazil | 15.74 | 6.1 | 2023 |
| Bulgaria | 30.18 | 9.4 | 2023 |
| Canada | 64.72 | -2.2 | 2022 |
| Chile | 24.57 | | 2024 |
| Colombia | 11.28 | 5.5 | 2023 |
| Costa Rica | 23.18 | 10.6 | 2025 |
| Croatia | 36.73 | 16.2 | 2023 |
| Cyprus | 52.14 | 5.8 | 2023 |
| Czech Republic | 39.07 | -1.0 | 2023 |
| Denmark | 60.72 | -0.5 | 2023 |
| Dominican Republic | 17.48 | 11.5 | 2024 |
| Ecuador | 12.09 | -2.6 | 2024 |
| El Salvador | 11.88 | 5.6 | 2023 |
| Estonia | 36.52 | -0.9 | 2023 |
| Finland | 56.48 | -0.1 | 2023 |
| France | 57.21 | 0.3 | 2023 |
| Germany | 64.18 | -1.3 | 2022 |
| Greece | 28.91 | 3.7 | 2023 |
| Guatemala | 8.73 | | 2023 |
| Honduras | 8.35 | 11.0 | 2024 |
| Hungary | 22.14 | 6.5 | 2017 |
| Iceland | 60.63 | -0.2 | 2019 |
| Ireland | 50.49 | 0.8 | 2023 |
| Israel | 37.48 | 6.2 | 2021 |
| Italy | 48.79 | -2.3 | 2023 |
| Japan | 42.24 | 5.1 | 2020 |
| Kosovo | 10.45 | 18.8 | 2022 |
| Latvia | 32.95 | 4.2 | 2023 |
| Lithuania | 37.60 | 2.1 | 2023 |
| Luxembourg | 89.49 | 2.3 | 2023 |
| Malaysia | 29.55 | | 2021 |
| Malta | 53.52 | -1.0 | 2022 |
| Mexico | 12.49 | | 2022 |
| Montenegro | 17.78 | 10.8 | 2021 |
| Netherlands | 69.09 | 1.5 | 2021 |
| North Macedonia | 15.52 | 8.7 | 2019 |
| Norway | 77.76 | 2.5 | 2023 |
| Panama | 18.58 | 3.8 | 2024 |
| Paraguay | 14.92 | 4.1 | 2024 |
| Peru | 10.67 | 4.1 | 2024 |
| Philippines | 7.21 | | 2023 |
| Poland | 38.84 | 1.6 | 2023 |
| Portugal | 33.68 | 4.6 | 2023 |
| Qatar | 73.36 | | 2017 |
| Romania | 29.85 | 7.5 | 2023 |
| Russia | 33.62 | 9.4 | 2023 |
| Serbia | 19.18 | 3.4 | 2022 |
| Seychelles | 21.00 | | 2018 |
| Slovakia | 24.46 | -1.0 | 2023 |
| Slovenia | 49.24 | 1.8 | 2023 |
| South Korea | 54.40 | 5.2 | 2021 |
| Spain | 47.30 | 2.1 | 2023 |
| Sweden | 55.60 | -0.7 | 2023 |
| Switzerland | 72.29 | -1.1 | 2022 |
| Taiwan | 46.23 | -0.9 | 2021 |
| Turkey | 19.94 | 4.0 | 2022 |
| United Arab Emirates | 76.52 | | 2018 |
| United Kingdom | 54.65 | 1.2 | 2021 |
| United States of America | 72.07 | 3.2 | 2024 |
| Uruguay | 26.84 | 3.7 | 2024 |
| Uzbekistan | 13.78 | 9.8 | 2024 |

== See also ==
- List of U.S. states and territories by income
- Disposable household and per capita income
- List of countries by average wage
- List of countries by wealth per adult
- Middle class
