= ISO 3166-2:BO =

Entry for Bolivia in ISO 3166-2

ISO 3166-2:BO is the entry for the Plurinational State of Bolivia in ISO 3166-2, part of the ISO 3166 standard published by the International Organization for Standardization (ISO), which defines codes for the names of the principal subdivisions (e.g., provinces or states) of all countries coded in ISO 3166-1.

Currently for Bolivia, ISO 3166-2 codes are defined for nine departments.

Each code consists of two parts, separated by a hyphen. The first part is BO, the ISO 3166-1 alpha-2 code of the Plurinational State of Bolivia. The second part is a letter, currently used in vehicle registration plates.

== Current codes ==
Subdivision names are listed as in the ISO 3166-2 standard published by the ISO 3166 Maintenance Agency (ISO 3166/MA).

Subdivision names are sorted in traditional Spanish alphabetical order: a–c, ch, d–l, ll, m–n, ñ, o–z.

Click on the button in the header to sort each column.

Code	Subdivision name (es)	Subdivision category
BO-C	Cochabamba	department
BO-H	Chuquisaca	department
BO-B	El Beni	department
BO-L	La Paz	department
BO-O	Oruro	department
BO-N	Pando	department
BO-P	Potosí	department
BO-S	Santa Cruz	department
BO-T	Tarija	department

== Changes ==
The following changes to the entry have been announced in newsletters by the ISO 3166/MA since the first publication of ISO 3166-2 in 1998. ISO stopped issuing newsletters in 2013.

Newsletter	Date issued	Description of change in newsletter
Newsletter II-1	2010-02-03 (corrected 2010-02-19)	Change of short form country name in accordance with ISO 3166-1, NL VI-6 (2009-05-08)

The following changes to the entry are listed on ISO's online catalogue, the Online Browsing Platform:

Effective date of change	Short description of change (en)
2009-05-08	Change of short and full names
2010-02-19	Change of short form country name in accordance with ISO 3166-1, NL VI-6 (2009-05-08)
2014-11-03	Update List Source
2014-12-18	Alignment of the English and French short names upper and lower case with UNTERM

== See also ==
- Subdivisions of Bolivia
- FIPS region codes of Bolivia
- Neighbouring countries: AR, BR, CL, PE, PY
