= Household income =

Household income is a measure of income received by the household sector. It includes every form of cash income, e.g., salaries and wages, retirement income, investment income and cash transfers from the government. It may include near-cash government transfers like food stamps, and it may be adjusted to include social transfers in-kind, such as the value of publicly provided health care and education.

Household income can be measured on various bases, such as per household income, per capita income, per earner income, or on an equivalised basis. Because the number of people or earners per household can vary significantly between regions and over time, the choice of measurement basis can impact household income rankings and trends.

When taxes and mandatory contributions are subtracted from household income, the result is called net or disposable household income. A region's mean or median net household income can be used as an indicator of the purchasing power or material well-being of its residents. Mean income (average) is the amount obtained by dividing the total aggregate income of a group by the number of units in that group. Median income is the amount that divides the income distribution into two equal groups, half having income above that amount, and half having income below that amount.

== Household disposable income per capita (OECD) ==
The list below represents a national accounts-derived indicator for a country or territory's per capita gross disposable household income (including social transfers in kind). According to the OECD, 'household disposable income is income available to households such as wages and salaries, income from self-employment and unincorporated enterprises, income from pensions and other social benefits, and income from financial investments (less any payments of tax on income or wealth, social insurance contributions and interest on financial liabilities). NPISH stands for non-profits serving households. 'Gross' means that depreciation costs are not subtracted.' This indicator also takes account of social transfers in kind 'such as health or education provided for free or at reduced prices by governments and not-for-profit organisations.' The data shown below is published by the OECD and is presented in purchasing power parity (PPP) in order to adjust for price differences between countries.

Gross Disposable income per capita of households and NPISH(including social transfers in kind)
Location	2024* (USD PPP)
United States	71,300
Luxembourg	70,150
Germany	61,303
Austria	57,890
Netherlands	57,419
Australia	56,019
Belgium	54,862
France	53,701
Iceland	52,641
United Kingdom	49,367
Denmark	49,099
Finland	48,805
Sweden	48,314
Ireland	47,972
Italy	47,463
Canada	46,972
Spain	44,600
Czech Republic	42,601
Portugal	41,952
Slovenia	41,839
Japan	40,482
Lithuania	40,432
New Zealand	40,028 (2022)
South Korea	39,796
Poland	39,186
Hungary	37,697
Slovakia	35,759
Estonia	34,450
Greece	33,888
Turkey	33,471
Latvia	31,873
Chile	26,586
Mexico	23,311
Colombia	20,846
Costa Rica	17,893 (2021)

*Figures have been rounded to the nearest dollar; if data is unavailable for 2024, figures for 2023, 2022 or 2021 are shown but figures from different years are not directly comparable.

=== Historical ===
Households and NPISHs net adjusted disposable income per household US dollars per person, PPP converted, 2021 Y/y increase Y/y decrease; ^{P} — provisional data
Country	2004	2005	2006	2007	2008	2009	2010	2011	2012	2013	2014	2015	2016	2017	2018	2019	2020	2021	2022	Δ
Australia	31,443	31,731	32,885	34,159	35,909	35,619	37,073	37,673	37,206	37,657	38,181	38,217	38,571	38,830	39,314	40,525	42,022	42,940	—N/a	11,497
Austria	39,569	40,808	41,743	42,595	42,989	42,871	42,478	42,196	42,593	41,751	41,771	41,336	41,874	42,252	42,577	42,837	41,473	42,781	43,452	3,883
Belgium	36,928	37,066	37,661	38,276	38,827	38,906	38,334	37,957	38,043	38,001	38,084	38,164	38,573	39,067	39,327	40,129	40,110	41,289	40,770^{P}	3,842
Canada	30,210^{P}	30,482^{P}	31,772^{P}	32,548^{P}	33,431^{P}	33,732^{P}	34,497^{P}	34,699^{P}	35,082^{P}	35,476^{P}	35,520^{P}	36,292^{P}	35,879^{P}	36,739^{P}	36,909^{P}	37,277^{P}	39,204^{P}	39,582^{P}	39,065^{P}	8,855
Costa Rica	—N/a	—N/a	—N/a	—N/a	—N/a	—N/a	—N/a	—N/a	14,088	14,274	14,554	15,038	15,953	16,957	17,236	17,405	—N/a	—N/a	—N/a	3,317
Czech Republic	22,870	23,641	24,525	25,090	25,360	25,772	25,907	25,648	25,430	25,399	26,003	26,761	27,487	28,646	29,695	30,663	30,766	32,045	31,163	8,293
Denmark	31,761	32,347	33,020	32,818	32,747	33,452	34,424	34,584	34,428	34,680	35,018	36,025	36,930	37,354	37,814	38,392	37,939	38,368	38,353	6,592
Estonia	13,968	15,438	17,434	18,788	20,093	18,567	17,883	18,511	18,525	19,526	20,388	21,605	22,496	23,288	24,595	25,494	25,885	27,036	25,673	11,705
Finland	32,147	32,512	33,057	33,981	34,602	34,718	35,396	35,495	35,317	35,163	34,861	35,139	35,698	35,966	36,567	37,295	37,366	37,939	37,250	5,103
France	35,569	35,736	36,381	37,213	37,203	37,685	38,164	38,109	37,952	37,534	37,862	38,083	38,583	39,052	39,313	39,923	39,218	40,583^{P}	40,781^{P}	5,212
Germany	36,965	37,285	37,745	37,893	38,311	38,322	38,738	39,372	39,637	39,653	40,156	40,776	41,716	42,241	43,014	43,338^{P}	43,858^{P}	44,059^{P}	43,758^{P}	6,793
Greece	27,353	27,429	28,822	29,655	29,824	29,933	27,367	24,120	21,394	20,349	20,782	21,266	21,387	21,315	21,604	22,947	22,288^{P}	23,871^{P}	24,399^{P}	-2,954
Hungary	18,799	19,664	20,044	19,169	18,839	18,182	18,081	18,752	18,235	18,600	19,160	19,871	20,681	21,873	23,422	24,458	24,127	25,587	26,527^{P}	7,728
Ireland	26,413	27,777	28,184	29,005	29,937	29,541	28,685	27,332	27,424	26,856	26,819	27,731	28,615	29,751	30,255	31,265	33,129	33,621	33,386	6,973
Italy	36,257	36,279	36,456	36,693	35,895	35,062	34,423	34,082	32,289	32,034	32,192	32,560	32,980	33,352	33,711	33,810	33,223	34,416	34,081	-2,176
Japan	27,415	27,906	28,295	28,617	28,334	28,541	28,957	29,099	29,515	29,711	29,337	29,698	30,163	30,420	30,660	31,124	32,366	31,768	31,709	4,294
Korea	18,421	18,809	19,417	20,229	20,513	20,742	21,505	21,821	22,246	23,043	23,714	24,936	25,263	25,650	26,404	27,165	27,926	28,478	—N/a	10,057
Latvia	13,201	14,727	16,718	18,189	18,912	16,783	16,304	15,775	16,568	17,172	17,953	19,172	20,183	21,136	22,207	22,657	23,159	24,397	23,781	10,580
Lithuania	17,880	19,166	21,225	21,841	23,644	21,459	21,774	22,350	22,918	23,872	24,322	25,410	27,191	27,756	28,934	30,933	32,863	33,685	32,137	14,257
Luxembourg	45,560	44,604	45,225	45,782	46,053	47,178	47,212	47,029	47,336	48,436	48,446	47,816	47,333	48,372	49,007	50,017	52,107	52,101	51,946	6,386
Mexico	14,914^{P}	14,912	15,740	15,624	15,483	15,281	15,409	16,356	16,449	16,672	16,879	17,725	17,692	17,555	17,509	17,808	16,454	17,490^{P}	17,164^{P}	2,250
Netherlands	34,697	34,645	36,004	36,688	37,155	37,731	37,685	37,777	37,468	37,010	37,388	37,746	38,286	38,454	39,175	39,940	40,393	41,497^{P}	41,860^{P}	7,163
New Zealand	25,173	25,686	26,484	27,851	27,202	27,794	28,124	28,934	29,139	29,509	29,378	30,078	30,881	31,632	32,635	33,599	35,372	—N/a	—N/a	10,199
Norway	35,254	37,570	35,519	36,897	37,520	38,578	39,125	39,938	40,907	41,711	42,120	43,442	42,833	43,256	43,289	43,737	43,407	44,835	43,623	8,369
Poland	16,227	16,419	17,237	18,017	18,787	19,694	20,525	20,568	20,792	21,014	22,149	22,808	24,067	24,918	25,932	27,198	28,336	28,274	28,588	12,361
Portugal	25,893	26,030	25,847	26,098	26,347	27,023	26,867	25,772	24,867	24,629	24,476	25,226	25,895	26,232	26,883	27,881	27,164	28,124	28,176^{P}	2,283
Slovakia	15,873	16,436	17,187	18,819	20,032	20,310	20,746	20,203	20,080	19,982	20,381	21,436	22,062	22,701	24,142	24,797	24,811	25,429	25,299	9,426
Slovenia	23,160	24,141	24,690	25,536	26,209	25,832	25,684	25,736	24,686	24,119	24,357	24,901	25,997	26,759	27,830	28,671	29,751	30,995	30,997	7,837
Spain	29,655	30,208	30,420	30,518	30,739	30,833	30,325	29,790	27,802	27,548	27,567	28,674	29,356	29,783	30,112	30,987	30,435	31,203^{P}	30,308^{P}	653
Sweden	30,420	31,044	32,177	33,335	33,948	34,234	34,835	35,538	36,351	36,642	36,960	37,592	38,553	38,540	38,632	38,821	38,166	39,404	39,048	8,628
Switzerland	38,387	39,165	40,203	41,371	41,445	41,696	42,089	42,196	42,828	43,491	43,694	43,926	44,109	43,533	43,499	44,059	45,284	45,189^{P}	45,784^{P}	7,397
United Kingdom	31,908	32,407	32,733	33,564	33,179	33,491	33,572	32,674	33,222	33,634	34,172	35,785	35,774	35,889	36,291	36,876	35,712	37,326	36,564	4,656
United States	44,407	44,402	45,434	45,954	46,360	46,242	46,665	47,208	48,066	47,089	48,200	49,605	50,220	51,283	52,678	54,040	57,374	59,037	55,532	11,125

== Median equivalised household disposable income ==
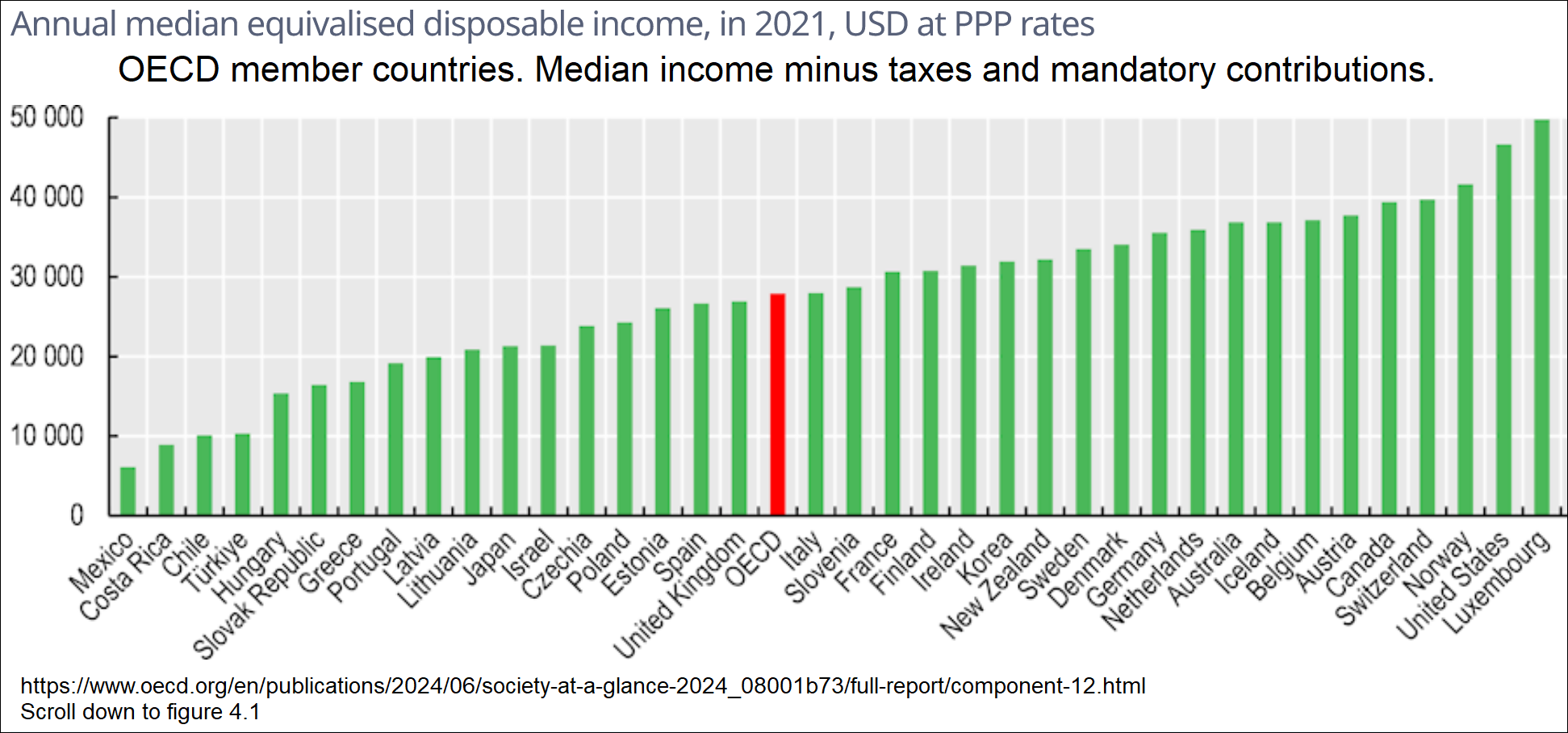
Annual median equivalised disposable income, in 2021, USD at PPP rates, by OECD country

The median equivalised household disposable income is the median of the disposable income which is equivalised by dividing income by the square root of household size; the square root is used to acknowledge that people sharing accommodation benefit from pooling at least some of their living costs. The median equivalised disposable income for individual countries in United States dollars, corrected for purchasing power parity (PPP) in 2021 is shown in the below tables. The top table will show figures from OECD for 2021 and the bottom table will show figures from the Luxembourg income Survey for the most recent available year between 2020-2024.

Median equivalised household disposable income
Location	2021 (USD PPP)
Luxembourg	49,748
United States	46,625
Norway	41,621
Switzerland	39,698
Canada	39,388
Austria	37,715
Belgium	37,110
Iceland	36,853
Australia	36,835
Netherlands	35,891
Germany	35,537
Denmark	34,061
Sweden	33,472
New Zealand	32,158
South Korea	31,882
Ireland	31,392
Finland	30,727
France	30,622
Slovenia	28,698
Italy	27,949
United Kingdom	26,884
Spain	26,630
Estonia	26,075
Poland	24,264
Czech Republic	23,802
Israel	21,366
Japan	21,282
Lithuania	20,856
Latvia	19,908
Croatia	19,680
Portugal	19,147
Greece	16,774
Slovak Republic	16,410
Romania	15,898
Hungary	15,361
Bulgaria	14,990
Turkey	10,341
Chile	10,101
Costa Rica	8,915
Mexico	6,090
South Africa	6,068

Median equivalised household disposable income (Luxembourg Income Study )
Location	2021 (Int$)	Year
Luxembourg	53,747	2023
United States	44,871	2024
Norway	44,846	2022
Switzerland	42,737	2022
Austria	41,756	2023
Canada	40,884	2022
Netherlands	40,373	2021
Australia	38,912	2020
Belgium	37,873	2024
Germany	36,300	2024
Denmark	35,598	2022
Ireland	34,700	2023
South Korea	34,004	2021
United Kingdom	33,787	2024
Sweden	32,022	2023
France	31,551	2022
Spain	29,572	2022
Japan	27,776	2020
Israel	25,948	2022
Italy	23,299	2022
Czechia	22,173	2023
Poland	22,101	2023
Lithuania	20,916	2023
Russia	20,542	2021
Greece	18,384	2021
Romania	18,023	2021
Bulgaria	16,722	2022
Uruguay	14,010	2024
Serbia	10,094	2022
Mexico	8,940	2024
Paraguay	8,874	2023
Palestine	8,560	2023
Brazil	8,323	2022
Colombia	6,180	2023
Peru	5,750	2021
Georgia	5,713	2022
Philippines	5,074	2023
South Africa	4,733	2023
Mali	4,200	2024

== See also ==
- Income distribution
- List of countries by household final consumption expenditure per capita
- List of countries by wealth per adult
- List of countries by GNI per capita growth
