= ISO 3166-2:GY =

Entry for Guyana in ISO 3166-2

ISO 3166-2:GY is the entry for the Co-operative Republic of Guyana in ISO 3166-2, part of the ISO 3166 standard published by the International Organization for Standardization (ISO), which defines codes for the names of the principal subdivisions (e.g., provinces or states) of all countries coded in ISO 3166-1.

Currently for Guyana, ISO 3166-2 codes are defined for ten regions.

Each code consists of two parts, separated by a hyphen. The first part is GY, the ISO 3166-1 alpha-2 code of Guyana. The second part is two letters.

== Current codes ==
Subdivision names are listed as in the ISO 3166-2 standard published by the ISO 3166 Maintenance Agency (ISO 3166/MA).

Click on the button in the header to sort each column.

| Code | Subdivision name (en) |
|---|---|
| GY-BA | Barima-Waini |
| GY-CU | Cuyuni-Mazaruni |
| GY-DE | Demerara-Mahaica |
| GY-EB | East Berbice-Corentyne |
| GY-ES | Essequibo Islands-West Demerara |
| GY-MA | Mahaica-Berbice |
| GY-PM | Pomeroon-Supenaam |
| GY-PT | Potaro-Siparuni |
| GY-UD | Upper Demerara-Berbice |
| GY-UT | Upper Takutu-Upper Essequibo |

== See also ==
- Subdivisions of Guyana
- FIPS region codes of Guyana
- Neighbouring countries: BR, SR, VE
