= ISO 3166-2:CO =

Entry for Colombia in ISO 3166-2

ISO 3166-2:CO is the entry for Colombia in ISO 3166-2, part of the ISO 3166 standard published by the International Organization for Standardization (ISO), which defines codes for the names of the principal subdivisions (e.g., provinces, states or departments) of all countries coded in ISO 3166-1.

Currently for Colombia, ISO 3166-2 codes are defined for one capital district and 32 departments. The capital district of Bogotá has special status equal to the departments.

Each code consists of two parts, separated by a hyphen. The first part is CO, the ISO 3166-1 alpha-2 code of Colombia. The second part is either of the following:

- two letters: capital district
- three letters: departments

== Current codes ==
Subdivision names are listed as in the ISO 3166-2 standard published by the ISO 3166 Maintenance Agency (ISO 3166/MA).

Subdivision names are sorted in traditional Spanish alphabetical order: a-c, ch, d-l, ll, m-n, ñ, o-z.

Click on the button in the header to sort each column.

Code	Subdivision name (es)	Local variant	Subdivision name (en)	Subdivision category
CO-AMA	Amazonas		Amazonia	department
CO-ANT	Antioquia		Antioquia	department
CO-ARA	Arauca		Arauca	department
CO-ATL	Atlántico		Atlantico	department
CO-BOL	Bolívar		Bolivar	department
CO-BOY	Boyacá		Boyaca	department
CO-CAL	Caldas		Caldas	department
CO-CAQ	Caquetá		Caqueta	department
CO-CAS	Casanare		Casanare	department
CO-CAU	Cauca		Cauca	department
CO-CES	Cesar		Cesar	department
CO-COR	Córdoba		Cordoba	department
CO-CUN	Cundinamarca		Cundinamarca	department
CO-CHO	Chocó		Choco	department
CO-DC	Distrito Capital de Bogotá	Distrito Capital	Bogota	capital district
CO-GUA	Guainía		Guainia	department
CO-GUV	Guaviare		Guaviare	department
CO-HUI	Huila		Huila	department
CO-LAG	La Guajira		La Guajira	department
CO-MAG	Magdalena		Magdalena	department
CO-MET	Meta		Meta	department
CO-NAR	Nariño		Narino	department
CO-NSA	Norte de Santander		North Santander	department
CO-PUT	Putumayo		Putumayo	department
CO-QUI	Quindío		Quindio	department
CO-RIS	Risaralda		Risaralda	department
CO-SAP	San Andrés, Providencia y Santa Catalina	San Andrés	San Andres	department
CO-SAN	Santander		Santander	department
CO-SUC	Sucre		Sucre	department
CO-TOL	Tolima		Tolima	department
CO-VAC	Valle del Cauca	Valle	Cauca Valley	department
CO-VAU	Vaupés		Vaupes	department
CO-VID	Vichada		Vichada	department

== Changes ==
The following changes to the entry have been announced by the ISO 3166/MA since the first publication of ISO 3166-2 in 1998. ISO stopped issuing newsletters in 2013.

Newsletter	Date issued	Description of change in newsletter
Newsletter I-6	2004-03-08	Change of name of CO-DC
Online Browsing; Platform (OBP)	2016-11-15	Addition of local variation of CO-DC, CO-SAP, CO-VAC; update list source

== See also ==
- Subdivisions of Colombia
- FIPS region codes of Colombia
- Neighbouring countries: BR, EC, PA, PE, VE
