= ISO 3166-2:PE =

Entry for Peru in ISO 3166-2

ISO 3166-2:PE is the entry for Peru in ISO 3166-2, part of the ISO 3166 standard published by the International Organization for Standardization (ISO), which defines codes for the names of the principal subdivisions (e.g., provinces or states) of all countries coded in ISO 3166-1.

Currently for Peru, ISO 3166-2 codes are defined for 25 regions and one municipality. The Metropolitan Municipality of Lima contains the capital of the country Lima and has special status equal to the regions.

Each code consists of two parts separated by a hyphen. The first part is PE, the ISO 3166-1 alpha-2 code of Peru. The second part is three letters.

== Current codes ==
Subdivision names are listed as in the ISO 3166-2 standard published by the ISO 3166 Maintenance Agency (ISO 3166/MA).

ISO 639-1 codes are used to represent subdivision names in the following administrative languages:

- (es): Spanish
- (qu): Quechua
- (ay): Aymara

Click on the button in the header to sort each column.

Code	Subdivision name (es)	Subdivision name (qu)	Subdivision name (ay)	Subdivision category
PE-AMA	Amazonas	Amarumayu	Amasunu	region
PE-ANC	Ancash	Anqash	Ankashu	region
PE-APU	Apurímac	Apurimaq	Apurimaq	region
PE-ARE	Arequipa	Ariqipa	Arikipa	region
PE-AYA	Ayacucho	Ayakuchu	Ayaquchu	region
PE-CAJ	Cajamarca	Kashamarka	Qajamarka	region
PE-CUS	Cusco (local variant: Cuzco)	Qusqu	Kusku	region
PE-CAL	El Callao	Qallaw	Kallao	region
PE-HUV	Huancavelica	Wankawillka	Wankawelika	region
PE-HUC	Huánuco	Wanuku	Wanuku	region
PE-ICA	Ica	Ika	Ika	region
PE-JUN	Junín	Hunin	Junin	region
PE-LAL	La Libertad	Qispi kay	La Libertad	region
PE-LAM	Lambayeque	Lampalliqi	Lambayeque	region
PE-LIM	Lima	Lima	Lima	region
PE-LOR	Loreto	Luritu	Luritu	region
PE-MDD	Madre de Dios	Mayutata	Madre de Dios	region
PE-MOQ	Moquegua	Muqiwa	Moqwegwa	region
PE-LMA	Municipalidad Metropolitana de Lima	Lima llaqta suyu	Lima hatun llaqta	municipality
PE-PAS	Pasco	Pasqu	Pasqu	region
PE-PIU	Piura	Piwra	Piura	region
PE-PUN	Puno	Punu	Puno	region
PE-SAM	San Martín	San Martin	San Martín	region
PE-TAC	Tacna	Taqna	Takna	region
PE-TUM	Tumbes	Tumpis	Tumbes	region
PE-UCA	Ucayali	Ukayali	Ukayali	region

== Changes ==
The following changes to the entry have been announced by the ISO 3166/MA since the first publication of ISO 3166-2 in 1998. ISO stopped issuing newsletters in 2013.

Newsletter/OBP	Date issued	Description of change	Code/Subdivision change
Newsletter II-2	2010-06-30	Update of the administrative structure and languages and update of the list source	Subdivision added: PE-LMA Municipalidad Metropolitana de Lima
Platform (OBP)	2014-11-03	Change Subdivision categories from department and constitutional province to region; update List Source	

== See also ==
- Subdivisions of Peru
- FIPS region codes of Peru
- Neighbouring countries: BO, BR, CL, CO, EC
