= ISO 3166-2:AR =

Entry for Argentina in ISO 3166-2

ISO 3166-2:AR is the entry for Argentina in ISO 3166-2, part of the ISO 3166 standard published by the International Organization for Standardization (ISO), which defines codes for the names of the principal subdivisions (e.g., provinces or states) of all countries coded in ISO 3166-1.

Currently for Argentina, ISO 3166-2 codes are defined for one city and 23 provinces. The city Buenos Aires is the capital of the country and has special status similar to the provinces.

Each code consists of two parts, separated by a hyphen. The first part is AR, the ISO 3166-1 alpha-2 code of Argentina. The second part is a letter, originally used in vehicle registration plates (the letters I and O are not used since they could be mistaken as 1 and 0 respectively and were left out of license plates), and currently used in postal codes.

== Current codes ==
Subdivision names are listed as in the ISO 3166-2 standard published by the ISO 3166 Maintenance Agency (ISO 3166/MA).

Click on the button in the header to sort each column.

Code	Subdivision name (es)	Subdivision category
AR-B	Buenos Aires	province
AR-K	Catamarca	province
AR-H	Chaco	province
AR-U	Chubut	province
AR-C	Ciudad Autónoma de Buenos Aires	city
AR-X	Córdoba	province
AR-W	Corrientes	province
AR-E	Entre Ríos	province
AR-P	Formosa	province
AR-Y	Jujuy	province
AR-L	La Pampa	province
AR-F	La Rioja	province
AR-M	Mendoza	province
AR-N	Misiones	province
AR-Q	Neuquén	province
AR-R	Río Negro	province
AR-A	Salta	province
AR-J	San Juan	province
AR-D	San Luis	province
AR-Z	Santa Cruz	province
AR-S	Santa Fe	province
AR-G	Santiago del Estero	province
AR-V	Tierra del Fuego	province
AR-T	Tucumán	province

== Changes ==
The following changes to the entry have been announced in newsletters by the ISO 3166/MA since the first publication of ISO 3166-2 in 1998:

Newsletter	Date issued	Description of change in newsletter
Newsletter II-2	2010-06-30	Typographical correction of a name and update of the list and code sources

== See also ==
- Subdivisions of Argentina
- FIPS region codes of Argentina
- UN/LOCODE:AR
- Neighbouring countries: BO, BR, CL, PY, UY
