= ISO 3166-2:VE =

Entry for Venezuela in ISO 3166-2

ISO 3166-2:VE is the entry for Venezuela in ISO 3166-2, part of the ISO 3166 standard published by the International Organization for Standardization (ISO), which defines codes for the names of the principal subdivisions (e.g., provinces or states) of all countries coded in ISO 3166-1.

Currently for Venezuela, ISO 3166-2 codes are defined for one capital district, one federal dependency and 23 states. The Venezuelan Capital District contains the central part of the capital of the country Caracas and has special status equal to the states.

Each code consists of two parts separated by a hyphen. The first part is VE, the ISO 3166-1 alpha-2 code of Venezuela. The second part is a letter:

- A: federal district
- B–V (except Q): states as of late 1980s
- W: federal dependency
- X: state created in 1998
- Y–Z: former federal territories given state status in early 1990s

== Current codes ==
Subdivision names are listed as in the ISO 3166-2 standard published by the ISO 3166 Maintenance Agency (ISO 3166/MA).

Click on the button in the header to sort each column.

Code	Subdivision name (es)	Subdivision name (en) (Note: For reference only, English name not included in the ISO 3166-2 standard.)	Subdivision category
VE-Z	Amazonas	Amazonia	state
VE-B	Anzoátegui	Anzoategui	state
VE-C	Apure	Apure	state
VE-D	Aragua	Aragua	state
VE-E	Barinas	Barinas	state
VE-F	Bolívar	Bolivar	state
VE-G	Carabobo	Carabobo	state
VE-H	Cojedes	Cojedes	state
VE-Y	Delta Amacuro	Amacuro Delta	state
VE-W	Dependencias Federales	Federal Dependencies	federal dependency
VE-A	Distrito Capital	Caracas	capital district
VE-I	Falcón	Falcon	state
VE-J	Guárico	Guarico	state
VE-X	La Guaira	La Guaira	state
VE-K	Lara	Lara	state
VE-L	Mérida	Merida	state
VE-M	Miranda	Miranda	state
VE-N	Monagas	Monagas	state
VE-O	Nueva Esparta	New Sparta	state
VE-P	Portuguesa	Portuguesa	state
VE-R	Sucre	Sucre	state
VE-S	Táchira	Tachira	state
VE-T	Trujillo	Trujillo	state
VE-U	Yaracuy	Yaracuy	state
VE-V	Zulia	Zulia	state

== Changes ==
The following changes to the entry have been announced by the ISO 3166/MA since the first publication of ISO 3166-2 in 1998:

Newsletter	Date issued	Description of change in newsletter	Code/Subdivision change
Newsletter I-4	2002-12-10	Addition of one state. Subdivision categories in header re-sorted	Subdivisions added: VE-X Vargas
Newsletter I-5	2003-09-05	Change of subdivision category of two Federal territories to States. List source updated	
Online Browsing Platform (OBP)	2009-03-03	Change of short name	
Newsletter II-1	2010-02-03 (corrected 2010-02-19)	Change of short form country name in accordance with ISO 3166-1 NL VI-5 (2009-03-03)	
Online Browsing Platform (OBP)	2010-02-19	Change of short form country name in accordance with ISO 3166-1 NL VI-5 (2009-03-03)	
Online Browsing Platform (OBP)	2014-12-18	Alignment of the English and French short names upper and lower case with UNTERM; update of the remarks in French	
Online Browsing Platform (OBP)	2015-11-27	Change of spelling of category name in fra and spa	
Online Browsing Platform (OBP)	2020-11-24	Change of subdivision name of VE-X; Update List Source; Correction of the Code Source	Subdivisions renamed: VE-X Vargas → La Guaira
Online Browsing Platform (OBP)	2024-02-29	Change of short name upper case: replace the parentheses with a comma	

== See also ==
- Subdivisions of Venezuela
- FIPS region codes of Venezuela
- Neighbouring countries: BR, CO, GY
