= UN/LOCODE:AR =

The UN/LOCODEs for Argentina start with AR, the ISO 3166-1 alpha-2 code for that country.

In edition 2006-1 24 codes were added. In edition 2007 3 codes were added.

== See also ==
- ISO 3166-2:AR
