= ISO 3166-2:BR =

Entry for Brazil in ISO 3166-2

ISO 3166-2:BR is the entry for Brazil in ISO 3166-2, part of the ISO 3166 standard published by the International Organization for Standardization (ISO), which defines codes for the names of the principal subdivisions (e.g. provinces or states) of all countries coded in ISO 3166-1.

Currently for Brazil, ISO 3166-2 codes are defined for 26 states and one federal district. The Federal District has a special status similar to the states.

Each code consists of two parts, separated by a hyphen. The first part is BR, the ISO 3166-1 alpha-2 code of Brazil. The second part is two letters, widely used in Brazil as abbreviations of the states and federal district.

== Current codes ==
Subdivision names are listed as in the ISO 3166-2 standard published by the ISO 3166 Maintenance Agency (ISO 3166/MA).

Click on the button in the header to sort each column.

Code	Subdivision name (pt)	Subdivision category
BR-AC	Acre	state
BR-AL	Alagoas	state
BR-AP	Amapá	state
BR-AM	Amazonas	state
BR-BA	Bahia	state
BR-CE	Ceará	state
BR-DF	Distrito Federal	federal district
BR-ES	Espírito Santo	state
BR-GO	Goiás	state
BR-MA	Maranhão	state
BR-MT	Mato Grosso	state
BR-MS	Mato Grosso do Sul	state
BR-MG	Minas Gerais	state
BR-PA	Pará	state
BR-PB	Paraíba	state
BR-PR	Paraná	state
BR-PE	Pernambuco	state
BR-PI	Piauí	state
BR-RJ	Rio de Janeiro	state
BR-RN	Rio Grande do Norte	state
BR-RS	Rio Grande do Sul	state
BR-RO	Rondônia	state
BR-RR	Roraima	state
BR-SC	Santa Catarina	state
BR-SP	São Paulo	state
BR-SE	Sergipe	state
BR-TO	Tocantins	state

== Previous codes ==
The following codes were used for previous states and territories:

- FN: Territory of Fernando de Noronha, split from Pernambuco (PE) in 1942, merged back into the state in 1988.
- GB: State of Guanabara, replaced the former Federal District (DF) in 1960, merged into the state of Rio de Janeiro (RJ) in 1975.
- GR: Territory of Guaporé, formed from parts of Amazonas (AM) and Mato Grosso (MT) in 1943, renamed Rondônia (RO) in 1956, became a state in 1981.
- IC: Territory of Iguaçu, formed from parts of Paraná (PR) and Santa Catarina (SC) in 1943, merged back into the states in 1946.
- PP: Territory of Ponta Porã, split from Mato Grosso (MT) in 1943, merged back into the state in 1946, part of Mato Grosso do Sul (MS) from its formation in 1977.
- RB: Territory of Rio Branco, split from Amazonas (AM) in 1943, renamed Roraima (RR) in 1962, became a state in 1988.

== Hierarchical numeric representation ==
IBGE conventions for numerical representation of each current federation unit, where the first digit is the region and the second digit its element:

Region	Federation units
Norte prefix 1	RO AC AM RR PA AP TO; 11 12 13 14 15 16 17
Nordeste prefix 2	MA PI CE RN PB PE AL SE BA; 21 22 23 24 25 26 27 28 29
Sudeste prefix 3	MG ES RJ SP; 31 32 33 35
Sul prefix 4	PR SC RS; 41 42 43
Centro-Oeste prefix 5	MS MT GO DF; 50 51 52 53

This is not part of the ISO standard but there is a direct mapping between ISO codes and IBGE numbers. IBGE is the authority for the ISO codes and defined both codes and numbers.

== See also ==
- FIPS region codes of Brazil
- Neighbouring countries: AR, BO, CO, FR (GF), GY, PE, PY, SR, UY, VE
