= ISO 3166-2:SR =

Entry for Suriname in ISO 3166-2

ISO 3166-2:SR is the entry for Suriname in ISO 3166-2, part of the ISO 3166 standard published by the International Organization for Standardization (ISO), which defines codes for the names of the principal subdivisions (e.g., provinces or states) of all countries coded in ISO 3166-1.

Currently for Suriname, ISO 3166-2 codes are defined for ten districts.

Each code consists of two parts separated by a hyphen. The first part is SR, the ISO 3166-1 alpha-2 code of Suriname. The second part is two letters.

== Current codes ==
Subdivision names are listed as in the ISO 3166-2 standard published by the ISO 3166 Maintenance Agency (ISO 3166/MA).

Click on the button in the header to sort each column.

Code	Subdivision name (nl)
SR-BR	Brokopondo
SR-CM	Commewijne
SR-CR	Coronie
SR-MA	Marowijne
SR-NI	Nickerie
SR-PR	Para
SR-PM	Paramaribo
SR-SA	Saramacca
SR-SI	Sipaliwini
SR-WA	Wanica

== See also ==
- Subdivisions of Suriname
- FIPS region codes of Suriname
- Neighbouring countries: BR, FR (GF), GY
