= ISO 3166-2:CL =

Entry for Chile in ISO 3166-2

ISO 3166-2:CL is the entry for Chile in ISO 3166-2, part of the ISO 3166 standard published by the International Organization for Standardization (ISO), which defines codes for the names of the principal subdivisions (e.g., provinces or states) of all countries coded in ISO 3166-1.

Currently for Chile, ISO 3166-2 codes are defined for 16 regions.

Each code consists of two parts, separated by a hyphen. The first part is CL, the ISO 3166-1 alpha-2 code of Chile. The second part is two letters.

== Current codes ==
Subdivision names are listed as in the ISO 3166-2 standard published by the ISO 3166 Maintenance Agency (ISO 3166/MA).

Click on the button in the header to sort each column.

Code	Subdivision name (es)	Local variant	Subdivision name (en)	Number
CL-AI	Aisén del General Carlos Ibañez del Campo	Aysén; Aisén	Aisen	XI
CL-AN	Antofagasta		Antofagasta	II
CL-AP	Arica y Parinacota		Arica and Parinacota	XV
CL-AT	Atacama		Atacama	III
CL-BI	Biobío		Biobio	VIII
CL-CO	Coquimbo		Coquimbo	IV
CL-AR	La Araucanía		La Araucania	IX
CL-LI	Libertador General Bernardo O'Higgins	O'Higgins	O'Higgins	VI
CL-LL	Los Lagos		The Lakes	X
CL-LR	Los Ríos		The Rivers	XIV
CL-MA	Magallanes		Magellan	XII
CL-ML	Maule		Maule	VII
CL-NB	Ñuble		Nuble	XVI
CL-RM	Región Metropolitana de Santiago		Santiago Metropolitan Region	XIII
CL-TA	Tarapacá		Tarapaca	I
CL-VS	Valparaíso		Valparaiso	V

== Changes ==
The following changes to the entry have been announced by the ISO 3166/MA since the first publication of ISO 3166-2 in 1998. ISO stopped issuing newsletters in 2013.

Newsletter	Date issued	Description of change in newsletter	Code/Subdivision change
Newsletter II-2	2010-06-30	Update of the administrative structure and of the list source	Subdivisions added: CL-AP Arica y Parinacota; CL-LR Los Ríos
Online Browsing; Platform (OBP)	2014-10-29	Change spelling of CL-AI and CL-BI; update List Source	Spelling changes: CL-AI, CL-BI
Online Browsing; Platform (OBP)	2016-11-15	Change of spelling of CL-AR, CL-AI; addition of local variation of CL-AI, CL-LI; update list source	Spelling changes: CL-AI, CL-AR
Online Browsing; Platform (OBP)	2018-11-26	Addition of region CL-NB; Update List Source	Subdivisions added: CL-NB Ñuble

== See also ==
- FIPS region codes of Chile
- Subdivisions of Chile
- Neighbouring countries: AR, BO, PE
