= ISO 3166-2:FR =

Entry for France in ISO 3166-2

ISO 3166-2:FR is the entry for France in ISO 3166-2, part of the ISO 3166 standard published by the International Organization for Standardization (ISO), which defines codes for the names of the principal subdivisions (e.g., provinces or states) of all countries coded in ISO 3166-1.

Currently for France, ISO 3166-2 codes are defined for the following subdivisions:

- Metropolitan France (three levels):
  - 12 metropolitan regions
  - three metropolitan collectivities with special status
  - 95 metropolitan departments
  - one European collectivity
- Overseas France:
  - one dependency
  - five overseas collectivities
  - one overseas collectivity with special status
  - three overseas departmental collectivities
  - one overseas territory
  - two overseas unique territorial collectivities

Each code consists of two parts, separated by a hyphen. The first part is FR, the ISO 3166-1 alpha-2 code of France. The second part is either of the following:

- one digit followed by two letters: European collectivity
- two digits: metropolitan departments
- two digits followed by a letter: metropolitan collectivities with special status
- two letters: overseas collectivities, overseas collectivity with special status, overseas territory (matching their ISO 3166-1 alpha-2 codes)
- three letters: metropolitan regions
- three digits: overseas departmental collectivities, overseas unique territorial collectivities

The metropolitan departments use their INSEE codes, which are currently used in postal codes, and used in vehicle registration plates until 2009. INSEE codes are assigned as follows:

- 01–89 except 20: departments created before the 20th century, assigned in alphabetical order (prefixes in the form of "Bas-" and "Haute-" are ignored at the primary sort level), except Paris and Yvelines, which replaced the former departments Seine and Seine-et-Oise respectively after the reorganization of the Paris region in 1968;
- 90: Territoire de Belfort, which was given department status in 1922;
- 91–95: departments created after the reorganization of the Paris region in 1968;
- 2A and 2B: Corse-du-Sud and Haute-Corse, which were created after the division of Corsica in 1975, whose INSEE code was 20.

== Current codes ==
Subdivision names are listed as in the ISO 3166-2 standard published by the ISO 3166 Maintenance Agency (ISO 3166/MA).

Click on the button in the header to sort each column.

=== First-level metropolitan subdivisions ===
Code	Subdivision name (fr)	Subdivision name (en) (Note: For reference only, English name not included in the ISO 3166-2 standard.)	Subdivision category
FR-ARA	Auvergne-Rhône-Alpes	Auvergne-Rhône-Alps	metropolitan region
FR-BFC	Bourgogne-Franche-Comté	Burgundy-Franche-Comté	metropolitan region
FR-BRE	Bretagne	Brittany	metropolitan region
FR-CVL	Centre-Val de Loire	Centre-Loire Valley	metropolitan region
FR-20R	Corse	Corsica	metropolitan collectivity with special status
FR-GES	Grand Est	Great East	metropolitan region
FR-HDF	Hauts-de-France	Upper France	metropolitan region
FR-IDF	Île-de-France	Paris	metropolitan region
FR-NOR	Normandie	Normandy	metropolitan region
FR-NAQ	Nouvelle-Aquitaine	New Aquitaine	metropolitan region
FR-OCC	Occitanie	Occitania	metropolitan region
FR-PDL	Pays-de-la-Loire	Loire Country	metropolitan region
FR-PAC	Provence-Alpes-Côte-d’Azur	Provence-Alps-French Riviera	metropolitan region

=== Second-level subdivisions ===
Code	Subdivision name (fr)	Subdivision name (en)	Subdivision category	In subdivision
FR-01	Ain	Ain (Note: The département is named after the eponymous river)	metropolitan department	ARA
FR-02	Aisne	Aisne	metropolitan department	HDF
FR-03	Allier	Allier	metropolitan department	ARA
FR-04	Alpes-de-Haute-Provence	Alps of Upper Provence	metropolitan department	PAC
FR-06	Alpes-Maritimes	Maritime Alps	metropolitan department	PAC
FR-6AE	Alsace	Alsace	European collectivity	GES
FR-07	Ardèche	Ardèche	metropolitan department	ARA
FR-08	Ardennes	Ardennes	metropolitan department	GES
FR-09	Ariège	Ariège	metropolitan department	OCC
FR-10	Aube	Aube	metropolitan department	GES
FR-11	Aude	Aude	metropolitan department	OCC
FR-12	Aveyron	Aveyron	metropolitan department	OCC
FR-13	Bouches-du-Rhône	Rhône Delta	metropolitan department	PAC
FR-14	Calvados	Calvados	metropolitan department	NOR
FR-15	Cantal	Cantal	metropolitan department	ARA
FR-16	Charente	Charente	metropolitan department	NAQ
FR-17	Charente-Maritime	Maritime Charente	metropolitan department	NAQ
FR-18	Cher	Cher	metropolitan department	CVL
FR-19	Corrèze	Corrèze	metropolitan department	NAQ
FR-2A	Corse-du-Sud	Southern Corsica	metropolitan department	20R
FR-21	Côte-d'Or	Gold Coast	metropolitan department	BFC
FR-22	Côtes-d'Armor	Armor Coast (Note: Armor is a Breton term which refers to the coast of Britanny)	metropolitan department	BRE
FR-23	Creuse	Creuse	metropolitan department	NAQ
FR-79	Deux-Sèvres	Two Sèvres (Note: Namely, the Sèvre Niortaise and the Sèvre Nantaise)	metropolitan department	NAQ
FR-24	Dordogne	Dordogne	metropolitan department	NAQ
FR-25	Doubs	Doubs	metropolitan department	BFC
FR-26	Drôme	Drôme	metropolitan department	ARA
FR-91	Essonne	Essonne	metropolitan department	IDF
FR-27	Eure	Eure	metropolitan department	NOR
FR-28	Eure-et-Loir	Eure and Loir	metropolitan department	CVL
FR-29	Finistère	Finisterre	metropolitan department	BRE
FR-30	Gard	Gard (Note: Named after the Gardon river)	metropolitan department	OCC
FR-32	Gers	Gers	metropolitan department	OCC
FR-33	Gironde	Gironde	metropolitan department	NAQ
FR-971	Guadeloupe	Guadeloupe	overseas departmental collectivity	-
FR-973	Guyane (française)	French Guiana	overseas unique territorial collectivity	-
FR-2B	Haute-Corse	Upper Corsica	metropolitan department	20R
FR-31	Haute-Garonne	Upper Garonne	metropolitan department	OCC
FR-43	Haute-Loire	Upper Loire	metropolitan department	ARA
FR-52	Haute-Marne	Upper Marne	metropolitan department	GES
FR-70	Haute-Saône	Upper Saône	metropolitan department	BFC
FR-74	Haute-Savoie	Upper Savoy	metropolitan department	ARA
FR-87	Haute-Vienne	Upper Vienne	metropolitan department	NAQ
FR-05	Hautes-Alpes	Upper Alps	metropolitan department	PAC
FR-65	Hautes-Pyrénées	Upper Pyrenees	metropolitan department	OCC
FR-92	Hauts-de-Seine	Upper Seine	metropolitan department	IDF
FR-34	Hérault	Herault	metropolitan department	OCC
FR-35	Ille-et-Vilaine	Ille and Vilaine	metropolitan department	BRE
FR-36	Indre	Indre	metropolitan department	CVL
FR-37	Indre-et-Loire	Indre and Loire	metropolitan department	CVL
FR-38	Isère	Isere	metropolitan department	ARA
FR-39	Jura	Jura	metropolitan department	BFC
FR-974	La Réunion	Reunion	overseas departmental collectivity	-
FR-40	Landes	Landes	metropolitan department	NAQ
FR-41	Loir-et-Cher	Loir and Cher	metropolitan department	CVL
FR-42	Loire	Loire	metropolitan department	ARA
FR-44	Loire-Atlantique	Atlantic Loire	metropolitan department	PDL
FR-45	Loiret	Loiret	metropolitan department	CVL
FR-46	Lot	Lot	metropolitan department	OCC
FR-47	Lot-et-Garonne	Lot and Garonne	metropolitan department	NAQ
FR-48	Lozère	Lozere	metropolitan department	OCC
FR-49	Maine-et-Loire	Maine and Loire	metropolitan department	PDL
FR-50	Manche	Channel (Note: See English Channel)	metropolitan department	NOR
FR-51	Marne	Marne	metropolitan department	GES
FR-972	Martinique	Martinique	overseas unique territorial collectivity	-
FR-53	Mayenne	Mayenne	metropolitan department	PDL
FR-976	Mayotte	Mayotte	overseas departmental collectivity	-
FR-69M	Métropole de Lyon	Greater Lyon	metropolitan collectivity with special status	ARA
FR-54	Meurthe-et-Moselle	Meurthe and Moselle	metropolitan department	GES
FR-55	Meuse	Meuse	metropolitan department	GES
FR-56	Morbihan	Morbihan	metropolitan department	BRE
FR-57	Moselle	Moselle	metropolitan department	GES
FR-58	Nièvre	Nievre	metropolitan department	BFC
FR-59	Nord	North	metropolitan department	HDF
FR-60	Oise	Oise	metropolitan department	HDF
FR-61	Orne	Orne	metropolitan department	NOR
FR-75C	Paris	City of Paris	metropolitan collectivity with special status	IDF
FR-62	Pas-de-Calais	Strait of Calais (Note: See Straits of Calais)	metropolitan department	HDF
FR-63	Puy-de-Dôme	Puy de Dome (Note: A volcano, see Puy de Dôme)	metropolitan department	ARA
FR-64	Pyrénées-Atlantiques	Atlantic Pyrenees	metropolitan department	NAQ
FR-66	Pyrénées-Orientales	Eastern Pyrenees	metropolitan department	OCC
FR-69	Rhône	Rhône	metropolitan department	ARA
FR-71	Saône-et-Loire	Saone and Loire	metropolitan department	BFC
FR-72	Sarthe	Sarthe	metropolitan department	PDL
FR-73	Savoie	Savoy	metropolitan department	ARA
FR-77	Seine-et-Marne	Seine and Marne	metropolitan department	IDF
FR-76	Seine-Maritime	Maritime Seine	metropolitan department	NOR
FR-93	Seine-Saint-Denis	Saint Denis Seine	metropolitan department	IDF
FR-80	Somme	Somme	metropolitan department	HDF
FR-81	Tarn	Tarn	metropolitan department	OCC
FR-82	Tarn-et-Garonne	Tarn and Garonne	metropolitan department	OCC
FR-90	Territoire de Belfort	Belfort Territory	metropolitan department	BFC
FR-95	Val-d'Oise	Oise Valley	metropolitan department	IDF
FR-94	Val-de-Marne	Marne Valley	metropolitan department	IDF
FR-83	Var	Var (Note: Although named after the Var River, this river is not actually located within the territory of the département)	metropolitan department	PAC
FR-84	Vaucluse	Vaucluse	metropolitan department	PAC
FR-85	Vendée	Vendee	metropolitan department	PDL
FR-86	Vienne	Vienne	metropolitan department	NAQ
FR-88	Vosges	Vosges	metropolitan department	GES
FR-89	Yonne	Yonne	metropolitan department	BFC
FR-78	Yvelines	Yvelines	metropolitan department	IDF

Explanatory note

=== Third-level subdivisions ===
Code	Subdivision name (fr)	Subdivision name (en)	Subdivision category	In subdivision
FR-67	Bas-Rhin	Lower Rhine	metropolitan department	6AE
FR-68	Haut-Rhin	Upper Rhine	metropolitan department	6AE

=== Dependency, overseas territory, and overseas collectivities ===
Code	Subdivision name (fr)	Subdivision name (en)	Subdivision category
FR-CP	Clipperton	Clipperton	dependency
FR-NC	Nouvelle-Calédonie	New Caledonia	overseas collectivity with special status
FR-PF	Polynésie française	French Polynesia	overseas collectivity
FR-BL	Saint-Barthélemy	Saint Barts	overseas collectivity
FR-MF	Saint-Martin	Saint Martin	overseas collectivity
FR-PM	Saint-Pierre-et-Miquelon	Saint Peter and Miquelon	overseas collectivity
FR-TF	Terres australes françaises	French Southern Territories	overseas territory
FR-WF	Wallis-et-Futuna	Wallis and Futuna	overseas collectivity

== Subdivisions included in ISO 3166-1 ==
Besides being included as subdivisions of France in ISO 3166-2, several subdivisions are also officially assigned their own country codes in ISO 3166-1.

Code	Subdivision name (fr)	ISO 3166-1 English name	ISO 3166-1 French name	ISO 3166-2 code
FR-971	Guadeloupe	Guadeloupe	Guadeloupe	ISO 3166-2:GP
FR-973	Guyane (française)	French Guiana	Guyane française	ISO 3166-2:GF
FR-974	La Réunion	Réunion	Réunion	ISO 3166-2:RE
FR-972	Martinique	Martinique	Martinique	ISO 3166-2:MQ
FR-976	Mayotte	Mayotte	Mayotte	ISO 3166-2:YT
FR-NC	Nouvelle-Calédonie	New Caledonia	Nouvelle-Calédonie	ISO 3166-2:NC
FR-PF	Polynésie française	French Polynesia	Polynésie française	ISO 3166-2:PF
FR-BL	Saint-Barthélemy	Saint Barthélemy	Saint-Barthélemy	ISO 3166-2:BL
FR-MF	Saint-Martin	Saint Martin (French part)	Saint-Martin (partie française)	ISO 3166-2:MF
FR-PM	Saint-Pierre-et-Miquelon	Saint Pierre and Miquelon	Saint-Pierre-et-Miquelon	ISO 3166-2:PM
FR-TF	Terres australes françaises	French Southern Territories	Terres australes françaises	ISO 3166-2:TF
FR-WF	Wallis-et-Futuna	Wallis and Futuna	Wallis-et-Futuna	ISO 3166-2:WF

The dependency Clipperton Island (FR-CP) is also exceptionally reserved the ISO 3166-1 alpha-2 code CP on the request of the International Telecommunication Union.

Metropolitan France (the part of France located in Europe) was previously officially assigned its own set of country codes in ISO 3166-1, with alpha-2 code FX, before it was deleted from ISO 3166-1. The code is now exceptionally reserved on the request of France.

Explanatory note

== Changes ==
The following changes to the entry have been announced by the ISO 3166/MA since the first publication of ISO 3166-2 in 1998. ISO stopped issuing newsletters in 2013.

Source	Date issued	Description of change	Code/Subdivision change
Newsletter I-2	2002-05-21	Correction of the Metropolitan region code in FR-79	
Newsletter I-9	2007-11-28	Addition of administrative subdivisions and of their code elements	Subdivisions added: FR-CP Clipperton; FR-BL Saint-Barthélemy; FR-MF Saint-Martin
Newsletter II-1	2010-02-03 (corrected 2010-02-19)	Addition of the country code prefix as the first code element, alphabetical re-ordering	
Newsletter II-3	2011-12-13 (corrected 2011-12-15)	NL II-2 correction for ultramarine administrative organisation change and alphabetical re-ordering.	Category change: FR-YT Mayotte overseas territorial collectivity → overseas department
Online Browsing Platform (OBP)	2016-11-15	Change of the delimitation of the regions, reducing their number from 22 to 13 in metropolitan France, change of parent subdivision of metropolitan departments; addition of overseas regions FR-GUA, FR-LRE, FR-MAY; change of subdivision category from overseas department to overseas territorial collectivity for FR-GF, FR-MQ; update List Source.	Subdivisions added: FR-GUA Guadeloupe; FR-LRE La Réunion; FR-MAY Mayotte; Category change: FR-GF overseas department → overseas territorial collectivity FR-MQ overseas department → overseas territorial collectivity
Online Browsing Platform (OBP)	2016-11-15	Correction of the OBP entry error as follows: deletion of Clipperton Island, France, Metropolitan in the name field for Territory.	
Online Browsing Platform (OBP)	2016-12-07	Correction of parent subdivision of FR-02, FR-60, FR-80 from FR-PDL to FR-HDF	Parent changes: FR-02 FR-PDL → FR-HDF; FR-60 FR-PDL → FR-HDF; FR-80 FR-PDL → FR-HDF
Online Browsing Platform (OBP)	2018-11-26	Addition of category name "collectivity" in eng/fra; Change of category name from metropolitan region to collectivity for FR-COR; Update List Source	Category change: FR-COR metropolitan region → collectivity
Online Browsing Platform (OBP)	2020-11-24	Change of category name from collectivity to metropolitan collectivity with special status for FR-COR; Change of category name from overseas department to overseas region for FR-GP, FR-RE, FR-YT; Deletion of parent subdivision of FR-GP, FR-RE, FR-YT; Change of category name from overseas region to overseas department for FR-GUA, FR-LRE, FR-MAY; Change of subdivision code from FR-COR to FR-20R, FR-GUA to FR-971, FR-LRE to FR-974, FR-MAY to FR-976; Assign parent subdivision to FR-971, FR-974, FR-976; Change of parent subdivision of FR-972, FR-973; Change of category name from overseas territorial collectivity to overseas collectivity for FR-BL, FR-MF, FR-PF, FR-PM, FR-WF; Addition of category overseas territory with specific status, overseas territory; Change of category name from overseas territorial collectivity to overseas collectivity with special status for FR-NC; Change of category name from overseas territorial collectivity to overseas territory for FR-TF; Update List Source and Code Source	Category changes: FR-COR collectivity → metropolitan collectivity with special status FR-GP overseas department → overseas region FR-RE overseas department → overseas region FR-YT overseas department → overseas region FR-GUA overseas region → overseas department FR-LRE overseas region → overseas department FR-MAY overseas region → overseas department FR-BL overseas territorial collectivity → overseas collectivity FR-MF overseas territorial collectivity → overseas collectivity FR-PF overseas territorial collectivity → overseas collectivity FR-PM overseas territorial collectivity → overseas collectivity FR-WF overseas territorial collectivity → overseas collectivity FR-NC overseas territorial collectivity → overseas collectivity with special status FR-TF overseas territorial collectivity → overseas territory Code changes: FR-COR → FR-20R; FR-GUA → FR-971; FR-LRE → FR-974; FR-MAY → FR-976; Subdivisions added: FR-972 Martinique (parent FR-MQ); FR-973 Guyane (française) (parent FR-GF)
Online Browsing Platform (OBP)	2021-11-25	Addition of category European collectivity in eng & fra; Addition of European collectivity FR-6AE; Addition of metropolitan collectivity with special status FR-69M; Change of category name from metropolitan department to metropolitan collectivity with special status for FR-75; Change of subdivision code from FR-75 to FR-75C; Addition of category overseas departmental collectivity in English & French; Change of category name from overseas department to overseas departmental collectivity for FR-971, FR-974, FR-976; Addition of category overseas unique territorial collectivity in eng & fra; Change of category name from overseas department to overseas unique territorial collectivity for FR-972, FR-973; Deletion of category name overseas department; Deletion of overseas region FR-GF, FR-GP, FR-MQ, FR-RE, FR-YT; Deletion of category name overseas region; Change of parent subdivision of FR-67, FR-68; Deletion of parent subdivision of FR-971, FR-972, FR-973, FR-974, FR-976; Modification of Remark part 2; Update List Source and Code Source	Codes added: FR-6AE Alsace; FR-69M Métropole de Lyon; Codes changed: FR-75 Paris (metropolitan department) → FR-75C Paris (metropolitan collectivity with special status); Codes removed: FR-GF Guyane (française); FR-GP Guadeloupe; FR-MQ Martinique; FR-RE La Réunion; FR-YT Mayotte; Category changes: FR-971 overseas department → overseas departmental collectivity FR-972 overseas department → overseas unique territorial collectivity FR-973 overseas department → overseas unique territorial collectivity FR-974 overseas department → overseas departmental collectivity FR-976 overseas department → overseas departmental collectivity Parent changes: FR-67 FR-GES → FR-6AE; FR-68 FR-GES → FR-6AE

Explanatory note

=== Former metropolitan regions (before 31 December 2015) ===
Former code	Subdivision name (fr)	Subdivision name (en)	Part of new region since 2016 (fr)
FR-A	Alsace	Alsace	Grand Est
FR-B	Aquitaine	Aquitaine	Nouvelle-Aquitaine
FR-C	Auvergne	Auvergne	Auvergne-Rhône-Alpes
FR-P	Basse-Normandie	Lower Normandy	Normandie
FR-D	Bourgogne	Burgundy	Bourgogne-Franche-Comté
FR-E	Bretagne	Brittany	Bretagne
FR-F	Centre-Val de Loire (Note: On 1 January 2015, the former region Centre was officially renamed to Centre-Val de Loire.)	Centre-Val de Loire	Centre-Val de Loire
FR-G	Champagne-Ardenne	Champagne-Ardenne	Grand Est
FR-H	Corse	Corsica	Corse
FR-I	Franche-Comté	Franche-Comté	Bourgogne-Franche-Comté
FR-Q	Haute-Normandie	Upper Normandy	Normandie
FR-J	Île-de-France	Île-de-France	Île-de-France
FR-K	Languedoc-Roussillon	Languedoc-Roussillon	Occitanie
FR-L	Limousin	Limousin	Nouvelle-Aquitaine
FR-M	Lorraine	Lorraine	Grand Est
FR-N	Midi-Pyrénées	Midi-Pyrénées	Occitanie
FR-O	Nord-Pas-de-Calais	Nord-Pas-de-Calais	Hauts-de-France
FR-R	Pays de la Loire	Pays de la Loire	Pays de la Loire
FR-S	Picardie	Picardy	Hauts-de-France
FR-T	Poitou-Charentes	Poitou-Charentes	Nouvelle-Aquitaine
FR-U	Provence-Alpes-Côte d'Azur	Provence-Alpes-Côte d'Azur	Provence-Alpes-Côte d'Azur
FR-V	Rhône-Alpes	Rhône-Alpes	Auvergne-Rhône-Alpes

== See also ==
- Subdivisions of France
- FIPS region codes of France
- NUTS codes of France
- Neighbouring countries: AD, BE, BR (via GF), CH, DE, ES, IT, LU, MC, NL (SX, via MF), SR (via GF)
