= Regions of Chile =

First-level national subdivision of Chile

Regions of Chile Regiones de Chile (Spanish)
- Category: Regional state
- Location: Chile
- Number: 16
- Populations: 100,745 (Aysén) – 7,400,741 (Metropolitan Santiago)
- Areas: 13,178.5 km^{2} (5,088.2 sq mi) (Ñuble) – 132,291 km^{2} (51,077.9 sq mi) (Magallanes and Chilean Antarctica)
- Government: Limited autonomous government
- Subdivisions: Province

Chile is divided into 16 regions (Spanish: regiones, singular región), which are the country's first-level administrative division. Each region is headed by a directly elected regional governor (gobernador regional) and a regional board (consejo regional).

The regions are divided into provinces (the second-level administrative division), each headed by a provincial presidential delegate (delegado presidencial provincial) appointed by the President. There are 56 provinces in total. Provinces are divided into communes (the third and lowest level administrative division), which are governed by municipal councils.

== Naming ==
Each region was given a Roman numeral, followed by a name (e.g. IV Región de Coquimbo, read as "fourth region of Coquimbo" in Spanish). When the regional structure was created, Roman numerals were assigned in ascending order from north to south, with the northernmost region designated as I (first) and the southernmost region as XII (twelfth). The Santiago Metropolitan Region, located in the center of the country and home to the country's capital Santiago, was excluded from this naming scheme and given instead the initials RM, standing for Región Metropolitana ("Metropolitan Region" in Spanish). With the creation of regions XIV (Los Ríos Region) and XVI (Ñuble Region) in the south and XV (Arica y Parinacota Region) in the north (XIII was not used) in 2007, the north-south Roman numeral order was broken.

In February 2018, the Strengthening of Regionalization Law (Law 21074) was enacted. Among other things, it removed the roman numerals from the designations.

== History of the regional structure ==
The administrative divisions of Chile were created in 1974 and limited to 13 regions (this limitation was eliminated in 2005 via a constitutional reform). Previously, Chile was divided into 25 provinces, which were further divided into departments, and then into communes. The new territorial organization was implemented in phases with some initial "pilot regions" beginning to operate in 1974, extending the process on January 1, 1976, to the rest of the country. The Santiago Metropolitan Region began to operate in April 1980.

In December 2006, two new regions were created: the northern Arica and Parinacota Region, by taking out the two northernmost provinces from the Tarapacá Region; and Los Ríos Region in the south, encompassing the provinces of Valdivia, formerly part of the Los Lagos Region, and Ranco, formerly part of Valdivia. Both regions became operative in October 2007.

In August 2017, the Ñuble Region was created from what was then the Ñuble Province of the Biobío Region. The old province was divided into three new provinces: Diguillín, Punilla and Itata. The new region's capital is Chillán. It became operational in September 2018.

== Administration ==
Since their creation, each region is headed by an intendant (intendente) appointed by the President of Chile, and a regional board (consejo regional). The intendants count with the direct collaboration of the SEREMI (Ministerial Regional secretary) in specific matters, such as public health, education, agriculture, among others. The SEREMI are appointed by the President. According to the Strengthening of Regionalization Law, since the 2020 municipal elections each intendant will be elected at the same date along with the mayors and municipal councillors, using a two-round system. If no candidate obtains the minimum threshold 40% of the valid votes, a runoff election is held between the two candidates with the most votes, and the winner is elected by a simple majority. Also the law will change the name Intendant to Regional Governor (Gobernador regional). The President will appoint a Regional presidential delegate (delegado presidencial regional), who will represent the national government in the region.

The board was elected among the members of the municipal councils (consejo municipal) of each commune of the respective region. Since the 2013 election the regional board members (Consejero regional) are directly elected using an open list proportional representation, with seats allocated using the D'Hondt method. Each of the 54 provinces are headed by a governor (gobernador) appointed by the President. In 2020, the provincial governors will change their name to Provincial presidential delegate' (delegado presidencial provincial), still appointed by the President.

== List of regions ==
Flag	Name (English/Spanish)	Capital	Area (km^{2})	Population (2024 census)	Density per km^{2}	Former number
Arica y Parinacota, Chile	Arica and Parinacota; Región de Arica y Parinacota	Arica	16,873.3	224,569	14.49	XV
Tarapaca, Chile	Tarapacá; Región de Tarapacá	Iquique	42,225.8	369,806	8.76	I
Antofagasta Region, Chile	Antofagasta; Región de Antofagasta	Antofagasta	126,049.1	635,416	5.04	II
Atacama, Chile	Atacama; Región de Atacama	Copiapó	75,176.2	299,180	3.98	III
Coquimbo Region, Chile	Coquimbo; Región de Coquimbo	La Serena	40,579.9	832,864	20.57	IV
Valparaiso Region, Chile	Valparaíso; Región de Valparaíso	Valparaíso	16,396.1	1,896,053	115.64	V
Metropolitan Region, Chile	Metropolitana; Región Metropolitana de Santiago	Santiago	15,403.2	7,400,741	480.47	RM (XIII)
O'Higgins Region, Chile	O'Higgins; Región del Libertador General Bernardo O'Higgins	Rancagua	16,387.0	987,228	60.24	VI
Maule, Chile	Maule; Región del Maule	Talca	30,296.1	1,123,008	37.07	VII
Ñuble Region, Chile	Ñuble; Región de Ñuble	Chillán	13,178.5	512,289	38.87	XVI
Biobío Region, Chile	Biobío; Región del Biobío	Concepción	23,890.2	1,613,059	67.52	VIII
La Araucanía Region	Araucanía; Región de La Araucanía	Temuco	31,842.3	1,010,423	31.73	IX
Los Ríos, Chile	Los Ríos; Región de Los Ríos	Valdivia	18,429.5	398,230	21.61	XIV
Los Lagos Region, Chile	Los Lagos; Región de Los Lagos	Puerto Montt	48,583.6	890,284	18.32	X
Aysen, Chile	Aysén; Región Aysén del General Carlos Ibáñez del Campo	Coyhaique	108,494.4	100,745	0.93	XI
Magallanes y la Antártica Chilena, Chile	Magallanes; Región de Magallanes y de la Antártica Chilena	Punta Arenas	132,291.1	166,537	1.26	XII

== See also ==
- Ranked lists of Chilean regions
- Administrative divisions of Chile
- Provinces of Chile
- Communes of Chile
- ISO 3166-2:CL
