= Vehicle registration plates of Ecuador =

Specifications for the current license plates from Ecuador since 2012

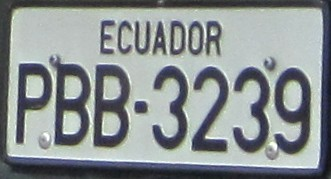
License plate from Ecuador

Vehicle registration in Ecuador is composed of two parts.

1. The vehicle registration document that describes the vehicle characteristics, such as the year of manufacture and vehicle identification number; and the vehicle owner's information, such as name and address. The registration must be renewed every four years.
2. The registration plates which display a unique registration letter-number combination. These must be placed on the front and rear of the vehicle. Two plates are issued for each vehicle, except motorcycles which receive one plate, and they should be inspected for serviceability every year. If the plates are damaged they should be replaced.

== Current plates ==
=== Plate characteristics ===
The plates are 154 mm high and 404 mm wide and are reflective in order to improve their visibility. The unique letter-number combination consists of three letters followed by three or four digits ranging from 000 to 9999. Formats in use are ABC-123 (old format) and ABC-1234 (new format). The word "Ecuador" appears in uppercase letters at the top of the plate. The plates are using FE-Schrift typeface for alphanumeric and Calibri typeface for ECUADOR text since 2022.

=== Letter codes ===
The first letter in the letter-number combination indicates the province of issue. The second letter, also called the "key letter", identifies the type of license plate (described below). Some plates have a small 'D' at the top right of the plate, meaning Duplicata or duplicate. The 'D' is used when the original plate is, for instance, lost or damaged.

List of Province Codes
Province	Letter	Province	Letter	Province	Letter
Azuay	A	Galápagos	W	Pastaza	S
Bolívar	B	Guayas	G	Pichincha	P
Cañar	U	Imbabura	I	Orellana	Q
Carchi	C	Loja	L	Sucumbíos	K
Cotopaxi	X	Los Ríos	R	Tungurahua	T
Chimborazo	H	Manabí	M	Zamora-Chinchipe	Z
El Oro	O	Morona Santiago	V	Santa Elena	Y
Esmeraldas	E	Napo	N	Santo Domingo de los Tsáchilas	J

=== Plate colors ===
Depending on the type of vehicle, license plates have different colors. Since June 2012, with the modification of the vehicle code, the form of the license plates was modified. Private vehicles continue with black characters on a white background. For non-private vehicles, the new license plates keep the same differentiating color as previously used, but the color is no longer applied to the entire license plate. These newer plates only have a colored upper border, and the rest of the license plate is white. This change was made in a way that improves the visibility of license plates, in particular to cameras and radars. All older style plates were expected to be replaced by 2019; however, the older style plates will remain valid until replaced.

== Vehicle types ==
=== Standard plates ===
The background color of license plates varies according to the second letter and identifies the type of vehicle as shown in the following table.

Image	Type	Second letter	Color	Format
	Private vehicle	Any except those shown below.	White-silver	EBA-0234
	Police vehicles but is being phased out. Changing to government vehicle.	W	White-silver	AWB-0123
	Commercial vehicles (such as taxis or buses)	A, U, Z	Orange	AAB-0123
	Government vehicles	E	Gold	PEB-0001
	Official use vehicles	X	Gold	GXA-0100
	Vehicles of the decentralized autonomous governments (regions, provinces, cantons, parishes)	M, S	Lime green	LMA-0010

Only in the Guyas province there is a light blue crest with the legend COMISION DE TRANSITO DE LA PROVINCIA DEL GUAYAS at the top left of the plate.

=== Diplomatic plates ===
The plates have a XX-0123 format with ECUADOR in black capital letters on top of the plates. The first two letters denote different types of plates based on the user of the vehicle.

Image	Type	Letters	Color	Example
	Diplomatic service vehicles	CC (Consular Corps); CD (Diplomatic Corps); OI (International Organization); AT (Administrative and Technical Personnel)	Blue	CC-0012

=== International organizations ===
Plates for vehicles belonging to International Organizations have white lettering on red background.

Image	Type	Letters	Color	Example
	International Organization	IT	Red	IT-0654

=== Military plates ===
The vehicles of the Armed Forces of Ecuador use plates that begin with the letter "F," and they have white writing on black background. These plates normally have the additional letter(s) "T" for Army vehicles, "N" for Naval vehicles, and "AE" for Air Force vehicles. Black on light blue colors are used for vehicles of military institutions. The registration consists of three letters followed by a hyphen and three numerals. DAC-### stands for Direccion General de Aviacion Civil.

=== Motorcycles ===
Bikes have black on yellow with X·#### or X·##### format.

=== Temporary plates ===
Temporary plates have white on black format with ECUADOR written in white capitals.

== Obsolete plates ==
The older style single color Ecuadorian license plates are in the process of being replaced, but it is possible that some may still be seen on vehicles.

Image	Type	Second letter	Color	Format
	Private vehicle	Any except those shown below.	White-silver	EBA-0234
	Police vehicles	W	White-silver	AWB-0123
	Commercial vehicles (such as taxis or buses)	A, U, Z	Orange	AAB-0123
	Government vehicles	E	Gold	PEB-0001
	Official use vehicles	X	Gold	GXA-0100
	Vehicles of the decentralized autonomous governments (regions, provinces, cantons, parishes)	M, S	Lime green	LMA-0010

The following plates that are in a different format are also being replaced.

Image	Type	Letters	Color	Example
	Diplomatic service vehicles	CC (Consular Corps); CD (Diplomatic Corps); OI (International Organization); AT (Administrative and Technical Personnel)	Blue	CC-0012
	International Organization	IT	Red	IT-0654
