= Vehicle registration plates of Bolivia =

Plurinational State of Bolivia
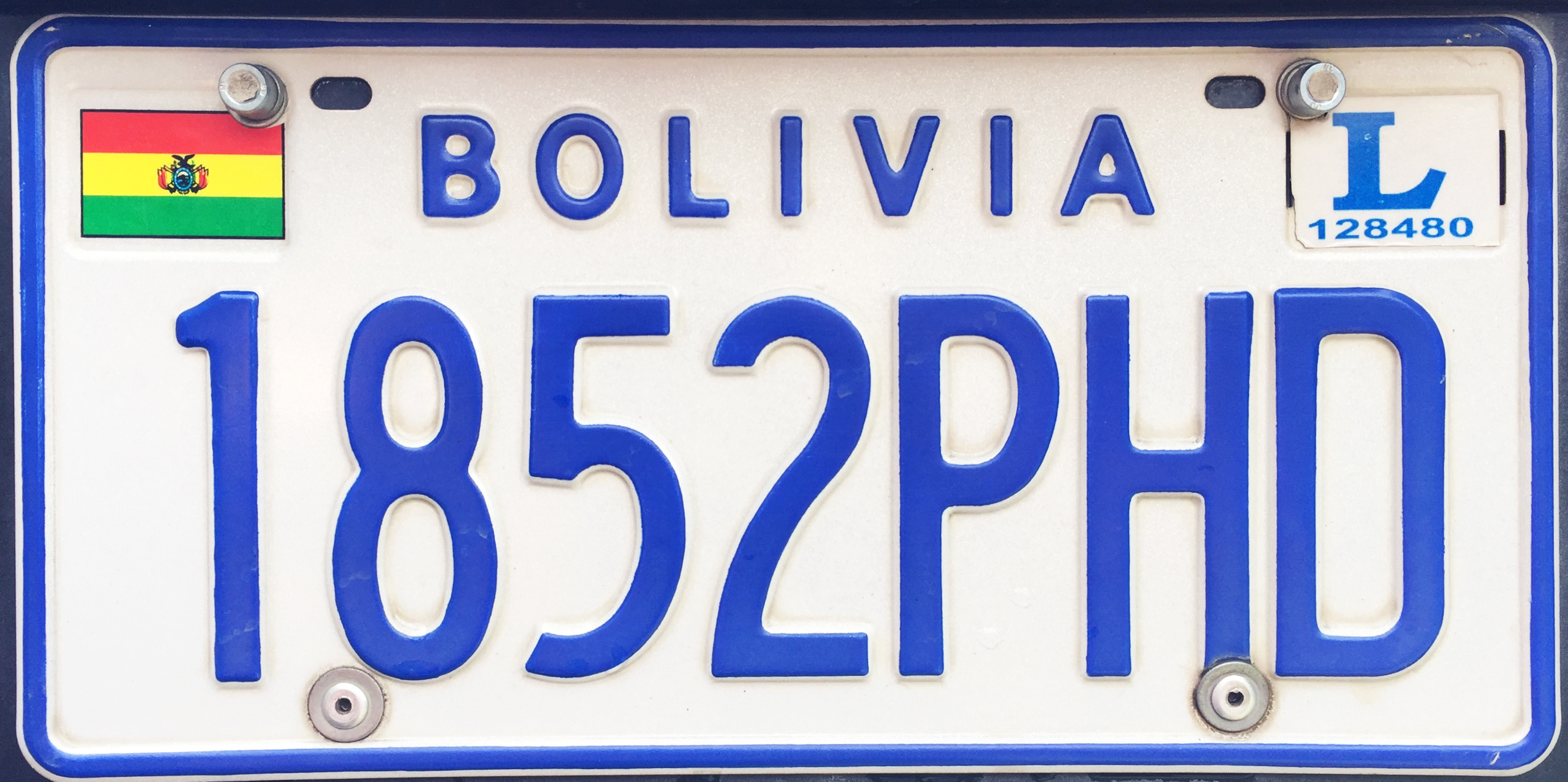
- Bolivian regular legal standard number plate.
- Country: Bolivia
- Country code: BOL

Current series
- Size: 300 mm × 152 mm 11.8 in × 6.0 in
- Serial format: 1234ABC
- Colour (front): Blue on white
- Colour (rear): Blue on white

Current motor vehicle registrations in Bolivia, commonly known as plate, are license plates with a unique combination of letters and numbers to individually identify each vehicle registered in the country.

== Formats ==
=== Old format (before 1987) ===
The previous Bolivian license plate system, used until January 1987, had an American format like the current one, with the name of the country; "BOLIVIA" at the bottom left of the license plate with a configuration of three numbers and three letters. The first letter indicated the department and the second letter indicated the type of vehicle (A-Car, C-Truck, T-Public car, etc.). The color of the license plate indicated the type of vehicle it was. Black characters on a white background for private vehicles, black on yellow for government vehicles, and white on red for public service vehicles.

=== Current format 1000AAA (1999-present) ===
Contains blue characters and boxes on a white background. It consists of the inscription "BOLIVIA" at the top, and a small box to its right indicates the vehicle's registration department. In the box there is a letter, which represents each department of the country as follows:

| Code | Department name |
|---|---|
| C | Cochabamba |
| H | Chuquisaca |
| B | El Beni |
| L | La Paz |
| O | Oruro |
| N | Pando |
| P | Potosí |
| S | Santa Cruz |
| T | Tarija |

In general, in the upper left box it bears the flag of Bolivia, although this is not evidenced in many current plates.

The type of service is described with the background of the box.

(Red: Public Service, White: Private Service, Yellow: Government Vehicle.)

The numbering consists of the PTA (Vehicle Titled Policy) that is issued for each vehicle only once. It consists of 3 or 4 numbers and 3 letters, starting the numbering in older vehicles 0XX AAA and ending in newer vehicles 64XX AAA (December 2024).

=== Standard format for Mercosur ===
Bolivian Mercosur license plate.

In October 2014, in the Libertador Hall of the Palacio San Martín in Buenos Aires, the new Unique Mercosur Patent was presented. It was expected that from January 1, 2016, this new license plate would be used in the member countries.

In Bolivia, the AB 12345 format will be used for the new patent.

== Special Formats ==
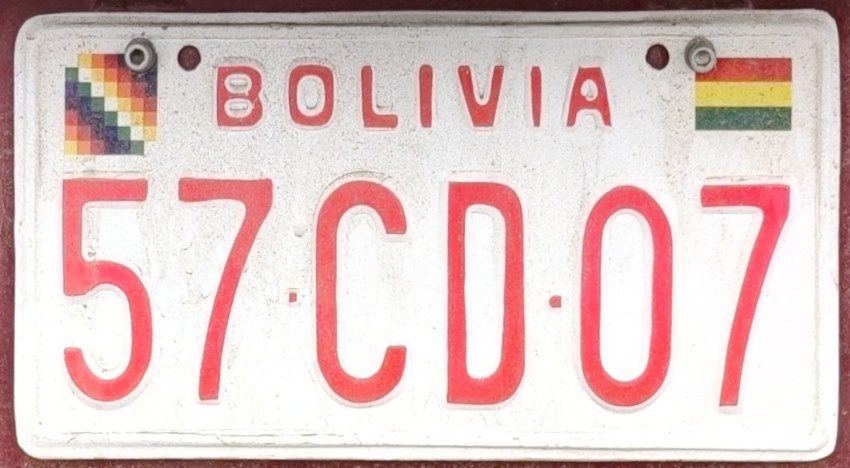
Diplomatic corps license plate.

The vehicles of the Diplomatic Corps, Consular Corps, Non-Governmental Organizations, International Mission, Departmental Government and some vehicles of the Police, Armed Forces and Emergency Services are exempt from the previous format.

| Type | | Colors | Serial format | Notes |
| English | Spanish | Colors | Serial format | Notes |
|---|---|---|---|---|
| Consular corps | Cuerpo consular | white on blue | 12-CC-34 | |
| Diplomatic corps | Cuerpo diplomático | red on white | 12-CD-34 | The first set of numbers indicates the country; the second set indicates the seniority rank. |
| International mission | Misión internacional | black on yellow | 12-MI-34 | |
| International organization | Organización internacional | white on green | 12-OI-34 | |

All these vehicles bear the inscription BOLIVIA on the top.

Some police and fire vehicles have the following format: PNX 123 and the inscription POLICÍA NACIONAL at the bottom (X referring to the department, example: PNL 456 which corresponds to a patrol car).

The armed forces carry two formats:

- The first corresponds to campaign vehicles, tanks and armored vehicles. It has the following format: EB 1234–56, FAB 1234-56 and ARB 1234-56 painted white on the body.
- The second format corresponds to utility and service vehicles with the following format: EBJ 123 (Army) and FAX 123 (X according to department) corresponding to the Air Force, both with the inscription BOLIVIA on the lower left side. Bolivian Navy vehicles use the PTA format.
