= Equivalisation =

Weighting technique in economics

Equivalisation is a technique in economics in which members of a household receive different weightings. Total household income is then divided by the sum of the weightings to yield a representative income. Equivalisation scales are used to adjust household income, taking into account household size and composition, mainly for comparative purposes.

== OECD equivalence scale ==
This is also called the "Oxford scale" and the "old OECD scale". Mentioned by the OECD in the 1980s for possible use in countries without an established scale.

- 1.0 to the first adult;
- 0.7 to the second and each subsequent person aged 14 and over;
- 0.5 to each child aged under 14.

== OECD-modified scale ==
The OECD-modified scale is widely used across Europe and used by the Statistical Office of the European Union (Eurostat). It adjusts household income to reflect the different resource needs of single adults, any additional adults in the household, and children in various age groups.

To calculate equivalised income using the modified OECD equivalence scale, each member of the household is first given an equivalence value:

- 1.0 to the first adult;
- 0.5 to the second and each subsequent person aged 14 and over;
- 0.3 to each child aged under 14.

Single adult households are taken as the reference group and are given a value of 1. For larger households, each additional adult is given a smaller value of 0.5 to reflect the economies of scale achieved when people live together, arising when households share resources such as water and electricity, which reduces living costs per person. Children under the age of 14 are given a value of 0.3 to take account of their lower living costs, while children aged 14 and over are given a value of 0.5 because their living costs are assumed to be the same as an adult.

The equivalence values for each household member are summed to give a total equivalence number for the household. For example, a household with a total equivalence value of 2 would show that the household needs twice the income of a single adult household in order to achieve a comparable standard of living.

== Square root scale ==
This has been adopted by more recent OECD publications. The household income is divided by the square root of household size.

- 1.0 for household of 1
- 1.414 for household of 2
- 1.732 for household of 3
- 2 for household of 4
- 2.236 for household of 5
- and so on
