= List of ISO 3166 country codes =

Two or three letter codes that represent each country

The International Organization for Standardization (ISO) created and maintains the ISO 3166 standard – Codes for the representation of names of countries and their subdivisions. The ISO 3166 standard contains three parts:

- ISO 3166-1 – Codes for the representation of names of countries and their subdivisions – Part 1: Country codes defines codes for the names of countries, dependent territories, and special areas of geographical interest. It defines three sets of country codes:
  - ISO 3166-1 alpha-2 – two-letter country codes which are also used to create the ISO 3166-2 country subdivision codes and the Internet country code top-level domains.
  - ISO 3166-1 alpha-3 – three-letter country codes which may allow a better visual association between the codes and the country names than the 3166-1 alpha-2 codes.
  - ISO 3166-1 numeric – three-digit country codes which are identical to those developed and maintained by the United Nations Statistics Division, with the advantage of script (writing system) independence, and hence useful for people or systems using non-Latin scripts.
- ISO 3166-2 – Codes for the representation of names of countries and their subdivisions – Part 2: Country subdivision code defines codes for the names of the principal subdivisions (e.g., provinces, states, departments, regions) of all countries coded in ISO 3166-1.
- ISO 3166-3 – Codes for the representation of names of countries and their subdivisions – Part 3: Code for formerly used names of countries defines codes for country names which have been deleted from ISO 3166-1 since its first publication in 1974.

The ISO 3166-1 standard currently comprises 249 countries, 193 of which are sovereign states that are members of the United Nations. Many dependent territories in the ISO 3166-1 standard are also listed as a subdivision of their administering state in the ISO 3166-2 standard, which is the case for China, Finland, France, the Kingdom of the Netherlands, Norway (Svalbard and Jan Mayen are listed, but Bouvet Island is not), and the United States of America, but not Australia, Denmark, New Zealand, or the United Kingdom of Great Britain and Northern Ireland.

== Current ISO 3166 country codes ==
The sortable table below contains the three sets of ISO 3166-1 country codes for each of its 249 countries, links to the ISO 3166-2 country subdivision codes, and the Internet country code top-level domains (ccTLD) which are based on the ISO 3166-1 alpha-2 standard with the few exceptions noted. See the ISO 3166-3 standard for former country codes.

ISO 3166 name	Sovereignty	ISO 3166-1			ISO 3166-2 subdivision codes link	TLD
ISO 3166 name	Sovereignty	A-2	A-3	Num.	ISO 3166-2 subdivision codes link	TLD
Afghanistan	UN member	AF	AFG	004	ISO 3166-2:AF	.af
Åland Islands	Finland	AX	ALA	248	ISO 3166-2:AX	.ax
Albania	UN member	AL	ALB	008	ISO 3166-2:AL	.al
Algeria	UN member	DZ	DZA	012	ISO 3166-2:DZ	.dz
American Samoa	United States	AS	ASM	016	ISO 3166-2:AS	.as
Andorra	UN member	AD	AND	020	ISO 3166-2:AD	.ad
Angola	UN member	AO	AGO	024	ISO 3166-2:AO	.ao
Anguilla	United Kingdom	AI	AIA	660	ISO 3166-2:AI	.ai
Antarctica (Note: The ISO 3166 country name Antarctica comprises the continent of Antarctica and all land and ice shelves south of the 60th parallel south.)	Antarctic Treaty	AQ	ATA	010	ISO 3166-2:AQ	.aq
Antigua and Barbuda	UN member	AG	ATG	028	ISO 3166-2:AG	.ag
Argentina	UN member	AR	ARG	032	ISO 3166-2:AR	.ar
Armenia	UN member	AM	ARM	051	ISO 3166-2:AM	.am
Aruba	Netherlands	AW	ABW	533	ISO 3166-2:AW	.aw
Australia (Note: The ISO 3166 country name Australia includes the Ashmore and Cartier Islands and the Coral Sea Islands.)	UN member	AU	AUS	036	ISO 3166-2:AU	.au
Austria	UN member	AT	AUT	040	ISO 3166-2:AT	.at
Azerbaijan	UN member	AZ	AZE	031	ISO 3166-2:AZ	.az
Bahamas (the)	UN member	BS	BHS	044	ISO 3166-2:BS	.bs
Bahrain	UN member	BH	BHR	048	ISO 3166-2:BH	.bh
Bangladesh	UN member	BD	BGD	050	ISO 3166-2:BD	.bd
Barbados	UN member	BB	BRB	052	ISO 3166-2:BB	.bb
Belarus	UN member	BY	BLR	112	ISO 3166-2:BY	.by
Belgium	UN member	BE	BEL	056	ISO 3166-2:BE	.be
Belize	UN member	BZ	BLZ	084	ISO 3166-2:BZ	.bz
Benin	UN member	BJ	BEN	204	ISO 3166-2:BJ	.bj
Bermuda	United Kingdom	BM	BMU	060	ISO 3166-2:BM	.bm
Bhutan	UN member	BT	BTN	064	ISO 3166-2:BT	.bt
Bolivia (Plurinational State of)	UN member	BO	BOL	068	ISO 3166-2:BO	.bo
Bonaire; Sint Eustatius; Saba	Netherlands	BQ	BES	535	ISO 3166-2:BQ	.bq; .nl (Note: Although the country code top-level domain .bq is reserved for the Caribbean Netherlands, these islands use the Netherlands country code top-level domain .nl instead.)
Bosnia and Herzegovina	UN member	BA	BIH	070	ISO 3166-2:BA	.ba
Botswana	UN member	BW	BWA	072	ISO 3166-2:BW	.bw
Bouvet Island	Norway	BV	BVT	074	ISO 3166-2:BV	(Note: The country code top-level domain .bv has not been implemented.)
Brazil	UN member	BR	BRA	076	ISO 3166-2:BR	.br
British Indian Ocean Territory (the)	United Kingdom	IO	IOT	086	ISO 3166-2:IO	.io
British Virgin Islands – See Virgin Islands (British).
Brunei Darussalam (Note: Both ISO and the United Nations use the country name Brunei Darussalam for Brunei.)	UN member	BN	BRN	096	ISO 3166-2:BN	.bn
Bulgaria	UN member	BG	BGR	100	ISO 3166-2:BG	.bg
Burkina Faso	UN member	BF	BFA	854	ISO 3166-2:BF	.bf
Burma – See Myanmar.
Burundi	UN member	BI	BDI	108	ISO 3166-2:BI	.bi
Cabo Verde (Note: Cabo Verde was previously known as Cape Verde.)	UN member	CV	CPV	132	ISO 3166-2:CV	.cv
Cambodia	UN member	KH	KHM	116	ISO 3166-2:KH	.kh
Cameroon	UN member	CM	CMR	120	ISO 3166-2:CM	.cm
Canada	UN member	CA	CAN	124	ISO 3166-2:CA	.ca
Cape Verde – See Cabo Verde.
Caribbean Netherlands – See Bonaire, Sint Eustatius and Saba.
Cayman Islands (the)	United Kingdom	KY	CYM	136	ISO 3166-2:KY	.ky
Central African Republic (the)	UN member	CF	CAF	140	ISO 3166-2:CF	.cf
Chad	UN member	TD	TCD	148	ISO 3166-2:TD	.td
Chile	UN member	CL	CHL	152	ISO 3166-2:CL	.cl
China	UN member	CN	CHN	156	ISO 3166-2:CN	.cn
China, The Republic of – See Taiwan (Province of China).
Christmas Island	Australia	CX	CXR	162	ISO 3166-2:CX	.cx
Cocos (Keeling) Islands (the)	Australia	CC	CCK	166	ISO 3166-2:CC	.cc
Colombia	UN member	CO	COL	170	ISO 3166-2:CO	.co
Comoros (the)	UN member	KM	COM	174	ISO 3166-2:KM	.km
Congo (the Democratic Republic of the)	UN member	CD	COD	180	ISO 3166-2:CD	.cd
Congo (the) (Note: ISO uses the United Nations country name the Congo for the Republic of the Congo.)	UN member	CG	COG	178	ISO 3166-2:CG	.cg
Cook Islands (the)	New Zealand	CK	COK	184	ISO 3166-2:CK	.ck
Costa Rica	UN member	CR	CRI	188	ISO 3166-2:CR	.cr
Côte d'Ivoire (Note: Côte d'Ivoire was previously known as Ivory Coast.)	UN member	CI	CIV	384	ISO 3166-2:CI	.ci
Croatia	UN member	HR	HRV	191	ISO 3166-2:HR	.hr
Cuba	UN member	CU	CUB	192	ISO 3166-2:CU	.cu
Curaçao	Netherlands	CW	CUW	531	ISO 3166-2:CW	.cw
Cyprus	UN member	CY	CYP	196	ISO 3166-2:CY	.cy
Czechia (Note: Czechia was previously known by its state name Czech Republic.)	UN member	CZ	CZE	203	ISO 3166-2:CZ	.cz
Democratic People's Republic of Korea – See Korea, The Democratic People's Republic of.
Democratic Republic of the Congo – See Congo, The Democratic Republic of the.
Denmark	UN member	DK	DNK	208	ISO 3166-2:DK	.dk
Djibouti	UN member	DJ	DJI	262	ISO 3166-2:DJ	.dj
Dominica	UN member	DM	DMA	212	ISO 3166-2:DM	.dm
Dominican Republic (the)	UN member	DO	DOM	214	ISO 3166-2:DO	.do
East Timor – See Timor-Leste.
Ecuador	UN member	EC	ECU	218	ISO 3166-2:EC	.ec
Egypt	UN member	EG	EGY	818	ISO 3166-2:EG	.eg
El Salvador	UN member	SV	SLV	222	ISO 3166-2:SV	.sv
Equatorial Guinea	UN member	GQ	GNQ	226	ISO 3166-2:GQ	.gq
Eritrea	UN member	ER	ERI	232	ISO 3166-2:ER	.er
Estonia	UN member	EE	EST	233	ISO 3166-2:EE	.ee
Eswatini (Note: Eswatini was previously known as Swaziland.)	UN member	SZ	SWZ	748	ISO 3166-2:SZ	.sz
Ethiopia	UN member	ET	ETH	231	ISO 3166-2:ET	.et
Falkland Islands (the) [Malvinas] (Note: ISO uses the country name the Falkland Islands [Malvinas] for the Falkland Islands.)	United Kingdom	FK	FLK	238	ISO 3166-2:FK	.fk
Faroe Islands (the)	Denmark	FO	FRO	234	ISO 3166-2:FO	.fo
Fiji	UN member	FJ	FJI	242	ISO 3166-2:FJ	.fj
Finland	UN member	FI	FIN	246	ISO 3166-2:FI	.fi
France (Note: The ISO 3166 country name France includes Clipperton Island.)	UN member	FR	FRA	250	ISO 3166-2:FR	.fr
French Guiana	France	GF	GUF	254	ISO 3166-2:GF	.gf
French Polynesia	France	PF	PYF	258	ISO 3166-2:PF	.pf
French Southern Territories (the) (Note: The ISO 3166 country name the French Southern Territories comprises all of the French Southern and Antarctic Lands except Adélie Land which is included in the ISO 3166 country name Antarctica.)	France	TF	ATF	260	ISO 3166-2:TF	.tf
Gabon	UN member	GA	GAB	266	ISO 3166-2:GA	.ga
Gambia (the)	UN member	GM	GMB	270	ISO 3166-2:GM	.gm
Georgia	UN member	GE	GEO	268	ISO 3166-2:GE	.ge
Germany	UN member	DE	DEU	276	ISO 3166-2:DE	.de
Ghana	UN member	GH	GHA	288	ISO 3166-2:GH	.gh
Gibraltar	United Kingdom	GI	GIB	292	ISO 3166-2:GI	.gi
Great Britain – See United Kingdom, The.
Greece	UN member	GR	GRC	300	ISO 3166-2:GR	.gr
Greenland	Denmark	GL	GRL	304	ISO 3166-2:GL	.gl
Grenada	UN member	GD	GRD	308	ISO 3166-2:GD	.gd
Guadeloupe	France	GP	GLP	312	ISO 3166-2:GP	.gp
Guam	United States	GU	GUM	316	ISO 3166-2:GU	.gu
Guatemala	UN member	GT	GTM	320	ISO 3166-2:GT	.gt
Guernsey	British Crown	GG	GGY	831	ISO 3166-2:GG	.gg
Guinea	UN member	GN	GIN	324	ISO 3166-2:GN	.gn
Guinea-Bissau	UN member	GW	GNB	624	ISO 3166-2:GW	.gw
Guyana	UN member	GY	GUY	328	ISO 3166-2:GY	.gy
Haiti	UN member	HT	HTI	332	ISO 3166-2:HT	.ht
Heard Island and McDonald Islands	Australia	HM	HMD	334	ISO 3166-2:HM	.hm
Holland – See Netherlands.
Holy See (the) (Note: The Holy See governs and represents the Vatican City State.)	UN observer	VA	VAT	336	ISO 3166-2:VA	.va
Honduras	UN member	HN	HND	340	ISO 3166-2:HN	.hn
Hong Kong	China	HK	HKG	344	ISO 3166-2:HK	.hk
Hungary	UN member	HU	HUN	348	ISO 3166-2:HU	.hu
Iceland	UN member	IS	ISL	352	ISO 3166-2:IS	.is
India	UN member	IN	IND	356	ISO 3166-2:IN	.in
Indonesia	UN member	ID	IDN	360	ISO 3166-2:ID	.id
Iran (Islamic Republic of) (Note: ISO uses the United Nations country name the Islamic Republic of Iran for Iran.)	UN member	IR	IRN	364	ISO 3166-2:IR	.ir
Iraq	UN member	IQ	IRQ	368	ISO 3166-2:IQ	.iq
Ireland	UN member	IE	IRL	372	ISO 3166-2:IE	.ie
Isle of Man	British Crown	IM	IMN	833	ISO 3166-2:IM	.im
Israel	UN member	IL	ISR	376	ISO 3166-2:IL	.il
Italy	UN member	IT	ITA	380	ISO 3166-2:IT	.it
Ivory Coast – See Côte d'Ivoire.
Jamaica	UN member	JM	JAM	388	ISO 3166-2:JM	.jm
Jan Mayen – See Svalbard and Jan Mayen.
Japan	UN member	JP	JPN	392	ISO 3166-2:JP	.jp
Jersey	British Crown	JE	JEY	832	ISO 3166-2:JE	.je
Jordan	UN member	JO	JOR	400	ISO 3166-2:JO	.jo
Kazakhstan	UN member	KZ	KAZ	398	ISO 3166-2:KZ	.kz
Kenya	UN member	KE	KEN	404	ISO 3166-2:KE	.ke
Kiribati	UN member	KI	KIR	296	ISO 3166-2:KI	.ki
Korea (the Democratic People's Republic of) (Note: Both ISO and the United Nations use the full state name the Democratic People's Republic of Korea for North Korea.)	UN member	KP	PRK	408	ISO 3166-2:KP	.kp
Korea (the Republic of) (Note: Both ISO and the United Nations use the full state name the Republic of Korea for South Korea.)	UN member	KR	KOR	410	ISO 3166-2:KR	.kr
Kuwait	UN member	KW	KWT	414	ISO 3166-2:KW	.kw
Kyrgyzstan	UN member	KG	KGZ	417	ISO 3166-2:KG	.kg
Lao People's Democratic Republic (the) (Note: Both ISO and the United Nations use the full state name the Lao People's Democratic Republic for Laos.)	UN member	LA	LAO	418	ISO 3166-2:LA	.la
Latvia	UN member	LV	LVA	428	ISO 3166-2:LV	.lv
Lebanon	UN member	LB	LBN	422	ISO 3166-2:LB	.lb
Lesotho	UN member	LS	LSO	426	ISO 3166-2:LS	.ls
Liberia	UN member	LR	LBR	430	ISO 3166-2:LR	.lr
Libya	UN member	LY	LBY	434	ISO 3166-2:LY	.ly
Liechtenstein	UN member	LI	LIE	438	ISO 3166-2:LI	.li
Lithuania	UN member	LT	LTU	440	ISO 3166-2:LT	.lt
Luxembourg	UN member	LU	LUX	442	ISO 3166-2:LU	.lu
Macao (Note: Macao may be spelt either Macao or Macau.)	China	MO	MAC	446	ISO 3166-2:MO	.mo
Madagascar	UN member	MG	MDG	450	ISO 3166-2:MG	.mg
Malawi	UN member	MW	MWI	454	ISO 3166-2:MW	.mw
Malaysia	UN member	MY	MYS	458	ISO 3166-2:MY	.my
Maldives	UN member	MV	MDV	462	ISO 3166-2:MV	.mv
Mali	UN member	ML	MLI	466	ISO 3166-2:ML	.ml
Malta	UN member	MT	MLT	470	ISO 3166-2:MT	.mt
Marshall Islands (the)	UN member	MH	MHL	584	ISO 3166-2:MH	.mh
Martinique	France	MQ	MTQ	474	ISO 3166-2:MQ	.mq
Mauritania	UN member	MR	MRT	478	ISO 3166-2:MR	.mr
Mauritius	UN member	MU	MUS	480	ISO 3166-2:MU	.mu
Mayotte	France	YT	MYT	175	ISO 3166-2:YT	.yt
Mexico	UN member	MX	MEX	484	ISO 3166-2:MX	.mx
Micronesia (Federated States of)	UN member	FM	FSM	583	ISO 3166-2:FM	.fm
Moldova (the Republic of)	UN member	MD	MDA	498	ISO 3166-2:MD	.md
Monaco	UN member	MC	MCO	492	ISO 3166-2:MC	.mc
Mongolia	UN member	MN	MNG	496	ISO 3166-2:MN	.mn
Montenegro	UN member	ME	MNE	499	ISO 3166-2:ME	.me
Montserrat	United Kingdom	MS	MSR	500	ISO 3166-2:MS	.ms
Morocco	UN member	MA	MAR	504	ISO 3166-2:MA	.ma
Mozambique	UN member	MZ	MOZ	508	ISO 3166-2:MZ	.mz
Myanmar (Note: Myanmar was previously known as Burma.)	UN member	MM	MMR	104	ISO 3166-2:MM	.mm
Namibia	UN member	NA	NAM	516	ISO 3166-2:NA	.na
Naoero	UN member	NR	NRU	520	ISO 3166-2:NR	.nr
Nepal	UN member	NP	NPL	524	ISO 3166-2:NP	.np
Netherlands (Kingdom of the)	UN member	NL	NLD	528	ISO 3166-2:NL	.nl
New Caledonia	France	NC	NCL	540	ISO 3166-2:NC	.nc
New Zealand	UN member	NZ	NZL	554	ISO 3166-2:NZ	.nz
Nicaragua	UN member	NI	NIC	558	ISO 3166-2:NI	.ni
Niger (the)	UN member	NE	NER	562	ISO 3166-2:NE	.ne
Nigeria	UN member	NG	NGA	566	ISO 3166-2:NG	.ng
Niue	New Zealand	NU	NIU	570	ISO 3166-2:NU	.nu
Norfolk Island	Australia	NF	NFK	574	ISO 3166-2:NF	.nf
North Korea – See Korea, The Democratic People's Republic of.
North Macedonia (Note: ISO used The former Yugoslav Republic of Macedonia as the country name prior to February 2019 when the naming dispute with Greece was settled.)	UN member	MK	MKD	807	ISO 3166-2:MK	.mk
Northern Mariana Islands (the)	United States	MP	MNP	580	ISO 3166-2:MP	.mp
Norway	UN member	NO	NOR	578	ISO 3166-2:NO	.no
Oman	UN member	OM	OMN	512	ISO 3166-2:OM	.om
Pakistan	UN member	PK	PAK	586	ISO 3166-2:PK	.pk
Palau	UN member	PW	PLW	585	ISO 3166-2:PW	.pw
Palestine, State of	UN observer	PS	PSE	275	ISO 3166-2:PS	.ps
Panama	UN member	PA	PAN	591	ISO 3166-2:PA	.pa
Papua New Guinea	UN member	PG	PNG	598	ISO 3166-2:PG	.pg
Paraguay	UN member	PY	PRY	600	ISO 3166-2:PY	.py
People's Republic of China – See China.
Peru	UN member	PE	PER	604	ISO 3166-2:PE	.pe
Philippines (the)	UN member	PH	PHL	608	ISO 3166-2:PH	.ph
Pitcairn (Note: ISO uses the United Nations country name Pitcairn for the Pitcairn, Henderson, Ducie and Oeno Islands.)	United Kingdom	PN	PCN	612	ISO 3166-2:PN	.pn
Poland	UN member	PL	POL	616	ISO 3166-2:PL	.pl
Portugal	UN member	PT	PRT	620	ISO 3166-2:PT	.pt
Puerto Rico	United States	PR	PRI	630	ISO 3166-2:PR	.pr
Qatar	UN member	QA	QAT	634	ISO 3166-2:QA	.qa
Republic of China – See Taiwan (Province of China).
Republic of Korea – See Korea, The Republic of.
Republic of the Congo – See Congo, The.
Réunion	France	RE	REU	638	ISO 3166-2:RE	.re
Romania	UN member	RO	ROU	642	ISO 3166-2:RO	.ro
Russian Federation (the) (Note: Both ISO and the United Nations use the full state name the Russian Federation for Russia.)	UN member	RU	RUS	643	ISO 3166-2:RU	.ru
Rwanda	UN member	RW	RWA	646	ISO 3166-2:RW	.rw
Saba – See Bonaire, Sint Eustatius and Saba.
Sahrawi Arab Democratic Republic – See Western Sahara.
Saint Barthélemy	France	BL	BLM	652	ISO 3166-2:BL	.bl
Saint Helena; Ascension Island; Tristan da Cunha	United Kingdom	SH	SHN	654	ISO 3166-2:SH	.sh
Saint Kitts and Nevis	UN member	KN	KNA	659	ISO 3166-2:KN	.kn
Saint Lucia	UN member	LC	LCA	662	ISO 3166-2:LC	.lc
Saint Martin (French part)	France	MF	MAF	663	ISO 3166-2:MF	.mf
Saint Pierre and Miquelon	France	PM	SPM	666	ISO 3166-2:PM	.pm
Saint Vincent and the Grenadines	UN member	VC	VCT	670	ISO 3166-2:VC	.vc
Samoa	UN member	WS	WSM	882	ISO 3166-2:WS	.ws
San Marino	UN member	SM	SMR	674	ISO 3166-2:SM	.sm
Sao Tome and Principe	UN member	ST	STP	678	ISO 3166-2:ST	.st
Saudi Arabia	UN member	SA	SAU	682	ISO 3166-2:SA	.sa
Senegal	UN member	SN	SEN	686	ISO 3166-2:SN	.sn
Serbia	UN member	RS	SRB	688	ISO 3166-2:RS	.rs
Seychelles	UN member	SC	SYC	690	ISO 3166-2:SC	.sc
Sierra Leone	UN member	SL	SLE	694	ISO 3166-2:SL	.sl
Singapore	UN member	SG	SGP	702	ISO 3166-2:SG	.sg
Sint Eustatius – See Bonaire, Sint Eustatius and Saba.
Sint Maarten (Dutch part)	Netherlands	SX	SXM	534	ISO 3166-2:SX	.sx
Slovakia	UN member	SK	SVK	703	ISO 3166-2:SK	.sk
Slovenia	UN member	SI	SVN	705	ISO 3166-2:SI	.si
Solomon Islands	UN member	SB	SLB	090	ISO 3166-2:SB	.sb
Somalia	UN member	SO	SOM	706	ISO 3166-2:SO	.so
South Africa	UN member	ZA	ZAF	710	ISO 3166-2:ZA	.za
South Georgia and the South Sandwich Islands	United Kingdom	GS	SGS	239	ISO 3166-2:GS	.gs
South Korea – See Korea, The Republic of.
South Sudan	UN member	SS	SSD	728	ISO 3166-2:SS	.ss
Spain	UN member	ES	ESP	724	ISO 3166-2:ES	.es
Sri Lanka	UN member	LK	LKA	144	ISO 3166-2:LK	.lk
Sudan (the)	UN member	SD	SDN	729	ISO 3166-2:SD	.sd
Suriname	UN member	SR	SUR	740	ISO 3166-2:SR	.sr
Svalbard; Jan Mayen	Norway	SJ	SJM	744	ISO 3166-2:SJ	(Note: The country code top-level domain .sj has not been implemented.)
Sweden	UN member	SE	SWE	752	ISO 3166-2:SE	.se
Switzerland	UN member	CH	CHE	756	ISO 3166-2:CH	.ch
Syrian Arab Republic (the) (Note: The Syrian Arab Republic is also known by its common country name Syria.)	UN member	SY	SYR	760	ISO 3166-2:SY	.sy
Taiwan (Province of China) (Note: ISO uses the country name Taiwan (Province of China) for Taiwan.)	Disputed (Note: The Republic of China controls Taiwan. The People's Republic of China claims Taiwan as its Taiwan Province. In deference to the People's Republic of China, UN M49 used by the United Nations for statistical purposes refers to Taiwan as Taiwan Province of China.)	TW	TWN	158	ISO 3166-2:TW	.tw
Tajikistan	UN member	TJ	TJK	762	ISO 3166-2:TJ	.tj
Tanzania, the United Republic of	UN member	TZ	TZA	834	ISO 3166-2:TZ	.tz
Thailand	UN member	TH	THA	764	ISO 3166-2:TH	.th
Timor-Leste (Note: Timor-Leste was previously known as East Timor.)	UN member	TL	TLS	626	ISO 3166-2:TL	.tl
Togo	UN member	TG	TGO	768	ISO 3166-2:TG	.tg
Tokelau	New Zealand	TK	TKL	772	ISO 3166-2:TK	.tk
Tonga	UN member	TO	TON	776	ISO 3166-2:TO	.to
Trinidad and Tobago	UN member	TT	TTO	780	ISO 3166-2:TT	.tt
Tunisia	UN member	TN	TUN	788	ISO 3166-2:TN	.tn
Türkiye (Note: Türkiye was previously known as Turkey.)	UN member	TR	TUR	792	ISO 3166-2:TR	.tr
Turkmenistan	UN member	TM	TKM	795	ISO 3166-2:TM	.tm
Turks and Caicos Islands (the)	United Kingdom	TC	TCA	796	ISO 3166-2:TC	.tc
Tuvalu	UN member	TV	TUV	798	ISO 3166-2:TV	.tv
Uganda	UN member	UG	UGA	800	ISO 3166-2:UG	.ug
Ukraine (Note: No full name in ISO 3166.)	UN member	UA	UKR	804	ISO 3166-2:UA	.ua
United Arab Emirates (the)	UN member	AE	ARE	784	ISO 3166-2:AE	.ae
United Kingdom of Great Britain and Northern Ireland (the)	UN member	GB	GBR	826	ISO 3166-2:GB	.gb; .uk (Note: Although the country code top-level domain .gb is reserved for the United Kingdom, the country uses the .uk country code top-level domain instead.)
United States Minor Outlying Islands (the) (Note: The ISO 3166 country name the United States Minor Outlying Islands comprises Baker Island, Howland Island, Jarvis Island, Johnston Atoll, Kingman Reef, Midway Atoll, Navassa Island, Palmyra Atoll, and Wake Island.)	United States	UM	UMI	581	ISO 3166-2:UM	(Note: The country code top-level domain .um has not been implemented.)
United States of America (the)	UN member	US	USA	840	ISO 3166-2:US	.us
United States Virgin Islands – See Virgin Islands (U.S.).
Uruguay	UN member	UY	URY	858	ISO 3166-2:UY	.uy
Uzbekistan	UN member	UZ	UZB	860	ISO 3166-2:UZ	.uz
Vanuatu	UN member	VU	VUT	548	ISO 3166-2:VU	.vu
Vatican City – See Holy See, The.
Venezuela (Bolivarian Republic of)	UN member	VE	VEN	862	ISO 3166-2:VE	.ve
Viet Nam (Note: ISO uses the United Nations country name "Viet Nam" for Vietnam.)	UN member	VN	VNM	704	ISO 3166-2:VN	.vn
Virgin Islands (British) (Note: ISO uses the country name Virgin Islands (British) for the Virgin Islands of the United Kingdom.)	United Kingdom	VG	VGB	092	ISO 3166-2:VG	.vg
Virgin Islands (U.S.) (Note: ISO uses the country name Virgin Islands (U.S.) for the Virgin Islands of the United States.)	United States	VI	VIR	850	ISO 3166-2:VI	.vi
Wallis and Futuna	France	WF	WLF	876	ISO 3166-2:WF	.wf
Western Sahara (Note: ISO has designated Western Sahara as the provisional country name for the region of the Maghreb claimed by both the Kingdom of Morocco and the Sahrawi Arab Democratic Republic.)	Disputed (Note: Both the Kingdom of Morocco and the Sahrawi Arab Democratic Republic claim the region known as Western Sahara. Morocco currently (2018) controls most of the coastal region while the Sahrawis control the interior.)	EH	ESH	732	ISO 3166-2:EH	(Note: The country code top-level domain .eh has not been implemented.)
Yemen	UN member	YE	YEM	887	ISO 3166-2:YE	.ye
Zambia	UN member	ZM	ZMB	894	ISO 3166-2:ZM	.zm
Zimbabwe	UN member	ZW	ZWE	716	ISO 3166-2:ZW	.zw

For user-assigned codes used by certain organizations, see ISO 3166-1 alpha-2 § User-assigned code elements and ISO 3166-1 alpha-3 § User-assigned code elements.

== See also ==
- Country code
  - Comparison of alphabetic country codes
  - Lists of country codes
- Country code top-level domain
  - Country code second-level domain
- Lists of countries and territories
  - Sovereign state
    - List of sovereign states
    - List of states with limited recognition
  - Dependent territory
