= Internationalized country code top-level domain =

Special type of top-level domain

An internationalized country code top-level domain (IDN ccTLD) is a top-level domain in the Domain Name System (DNS) of the Internet. IDN ccTLDs are specially encoded domain names that are displayed in an end user application, such as a web browser, in their language-native script or alphabet, such as the Arabic alphabet, or a non-alphabetic writing system, such as Chinese characters. IDN ccTLDs are an application of the internationalized domain name system to top-level Internet domains assigned to countries, or independent geographic regions.

Although the domain class uses the term code, some of these ccTLDs are not codes but full words. For example, السعودية (as-Suʻūdiyya) is not an abbreviation of "Saudi Arabia", but the commonwealth short-form name of the country in Arabic.

Countries with internationalized ccTLDs also retain their traditional ASCII-based ccTLDs.

As of August 2018 there are 59 approved internationalized country code top-level domains, of them at least 47 used. The most used are .рф (the Russian Federation) with over 900,000 domain names, .台灣 (Taiwan) with around 500,000 and .中国 (the People's Republic of China) with over 200,000 domains. As of 2018, around 20 countries using non-Latin script do not have an internationalized country code top-level domain, including Japan and Iran.

== History ==
The ICANN board approved the establishment of an internationalized top-level domain name working group within the Country Code Names Supporting Organization (ccNSO) in December 2006. They resolved in June 2007 inter alia to proceed and asked the IDNC Working Group to prepare a proposal, which the group delivered in June 2008, "to recommend mechanisms to introduce a limited number of non-contentious IDN ccTLDs, associated with the ISO 3166-1 two-letter codes in a short time frame to meet near term demand." The group proposed a methodology using ICANN's Fast Track Process based on the ICANN charter to work with the Internet Assigned Numbers Authority

1. Identify technical basis of the TLD strings and country code specific processes, select IDN ccTLD personnel and authorities, and prepare documentation;
2. Perform ICANN due diligence process for technical proposal and publish method;
3. Enter delegation process within established IANA procedures.

In October 2009, ICANN resolved to start accepting applications for top-level internationalized domain names from representatives of countries and territories in November. Starting 16 November 2009, nations and territories could apply for IDN ccTLDs. Egypt, Saudi Arabia, the United Arab Emirates, and the Russian Federation were among the first countries to apply for the new internationalized domain name country code top-level domains. In January 2010 ICANN announced that these countries' IDN ccTLDs were the first four new IDN ccTLDs to have passed the Fast Track String Evaluation within the domain application process. In May 2010, twenty-one countries representing eleven languages, including Chinese, Russian, Tamil, and Thai, had requested new IDN country codes.

On 5 May 2010, the first implementations, all in the Arabic alphabet, were activated. Egypt was assigned the مصر. country code, Saudi Arabia السعودية., and the United Arab Emirates امارات., (all reading right to left as is customary in Arabic). ICANN CEO Rod Beckstrom described the launch as "historic" and "a seismic shift that will forever change the online landscape." "This is the beginning of a transition that will make the Internet more accessible and user friendly to millions around the globe, regardless of where they live or what language they speak", he added. Senior director for internationalised domain names Tina Dam said it was "the most significant day" since the launch of the Internet. According to ICANN, Arabic was chosen for the initial roll out because it is one of the most widely used non-Latin languages on the Internet. There are problems entering a mixed left-to-right and right-to-left text string on a keyboard, making fully Arabic web addresses extra useful.

Additional IDN ccTLDs had been implemented by the end of June 2010: one using Cyrillic, .рф (for Russia), and five using Chinese characters (the first using a non-alphabetical writing system) approved by the ICANN board on 25 June 2010:

- .中国 (encoded as ".xn--fiqs8s") and .中國 (encoded as ".xn--fiqz9s"), delegated to China Internet Network Information Center (CNNIC), the registrar for ccTLD .cn;
- .香港 (encoded as ".xn--j6w193g"), delegated to Hong Kong Internet Registration Corporation (HKIRC), the registrar for ccTLD .hk;
- .台灣 (encoded as ".xn--kpry57d") and .台湾 (encoded as ".xn--kprw13d"), delegated to Taiwan Network Information Center (TWNIC), the registrar for ccTLD .tw.

The dual domains delegated to each of CNNIC and TWNIC are synonymous, being purely orthographical variations differing only in using simplified forms (国 and 國), as preferred in mainland China, versus traditional forms of the same characters ( 灣 and 湾), as used in Taiwan.

The new country codes were available for immediate use, although ICANN admit they may not work properly for all users initially. According to Egypt's communication and information technology minister, three Egyptian companies were the first to receive domain licenses on the new "masr" (transliteration of مصر) country code. Egypt's Ministry of Communications was possibly the first functional website with an entirely Arabic address. The ccTLD .рф for Russia launched on 13 May. Bulgaria's .бг was rejected by the ICANN due to its visual similarity with .br. .бг was eventually approved in 2014.

The Ukrainian string .укр was approved by the ICANN Board on 28 February 2013. The zone was added to the root servers on March 19, 2013. The Bulgarian string .бг was rejected a second time in March 2011 but was approved by the ICANN Board in 2014, and the Greek .ελ string in 2015, both after controversies about possibilities of confusion with existing Latin strings. India has applied for top-level domains in each of its local scripts, at first seven, later eight more. The first one, .भारत, was approved 2011 and became active in 2014. The general flow of applications has ceased after 2016.

The Pakistan string پاکستان. was approved by the ICANN BOARD on 7 January 2011 to represent Pakistan in Arabic script. On 4 February 2017, the IDN ccTLD was delegated to the National Telecommunication Corporation and the zone was added to the root servers on 15 February 2017.

The European Union applied in 2016 for the Cyrillic domain .ею and the Greek domain .ευ. ею was approved and put into operation, but ευ was rejected as being too similar to .eu also belonging to the European Union. In 2019 ευ was approved on the condition that the same registry organisation EURid own both, and makes sure two equal or equally looking second-level domains are not registered in both ccTLD. Second-level domains under eu, ею and ευ shall have same script as the ccTLD (older Greek or Cyrillic domains under .eu got cloned into the new domain, but kept under .eu)

== List ==
Internationalized country code top-level domains
DNS name	IDN ccTLD	Country/Region	Language	Script	Transliteration	Comments	Other ccTLD	DNSSEC
xn--lgbbat1ad8j	.الجزائر	Algeria	Arabic	Arabic (Arabic)	al-Jazā'ir		.dz	No
xn--y9a3aq	.հայ	Armenia	Armenian	Armenian	hay		.am	Yes
xn--mgbcpq6gpa1a	.البحرين	Bahrain	Arabic	Arabic	al-Baḥrain	Not in use	.bh	Yes
xn--54b7fta0cc	.বাংলা	Bangladesh	Bengali	Bengali	Bangla		.bd	No
xn--90ais	.бел	Belarus	Belarusian	Cyrillic	bel		.by	Yes
xn--90ae	.бг	Bulgaria	Bulgarian	Cyrillic	bg		.bg	Yes
xn--fiqs8s	.中国	China	Chinese	Chinese (Simplified)	Zhōngguó		.cn	Yes
xn--fiqz9s	.中國	China	Chinese	Chinese (Traditional)	Zhōngguó		.cn	Yes
xn--wgbh1c	.مصر	Egypt	Arabic	Arabic (Arabic)	Miṣr / Maṣr		.eg	Yes
xn--e1a4c	.ею	European Union	Bulgarian	Cyrillic	eyu		.eu	Yes
xn--qxa6a	.ευ	European Union	Greek	Greek	ey	In use since 2022	.eu	Yes
xn--node	.გე	Georgia	Georgian	Georgian (Mkhedruli)	GE		.ge	No
xn--qxam	.ελ	Greece	Greek	Greek	el	In use since July 2018	.gr	Yes
xn--j6w193g	.香港	Hong Kong	Chinese	Chinese (Simplified and Traditional)	Hoeng^{1} gong^{2} / Xiānggǎng		.hk	Yes
xn--h2brj9c	.भारत	India	Hindi	Devanagari	Bhārat	Became available 27 August 2014	.in	Yes
xn--mgbbh1a71e	.بھارت	India	Urdu	Arabic (Urdu)	Bhārat	Became available 2017	.in	Yes
xn--fpcrj9c3d	.భారత్	India	Telugu	Telugu	Bhārat	Became available 2017	.in	Yes
xn--gecrj9c	.ભારત	India	Gujarati	Gujarati	Bhārat	Became available 2017	.in	Yes
xn--s9brj9c	.ਭਾਰਤ	India	Punjabi	Gurmukhī	Bhārat	Became available 2017	.in	Yes
xn--xkc2dl3a5ee0h	.இந்தியா	India	Tamil	Tamil	Intiyā	Became available 2015	.in	Yes
xn--45brj9c	.ভারত	India	Bengali	Bengali	Bharôt	Became available 2017	.in	Yes
xn--2scrj9c	.ಭಾರತ	India	Kannada	Kannada	Bhārata	Became available 2020	.in	Yes
xn--rvc1e0am3e	.ഭാരതം	India	Malayalam	Malayalam	Bhāratam	Became available 2020	.in	Yes
xn--45br5cyl	.ভাৰত	India	Assamese	Bengali	Bharatam	Became available 2022	.in	Yes
xn--3hcrj9c	.ଭାରତ	India	Oriya	Oriya	Bhārat	Became available 2021	.in	Yes
xn--mgbbh1a	.بارت	India	Kashmiri	Arabic (Kashmiri)	Bārat	Became available 2022	.in	Yes
xn--h2breg3eve	.भारतम्	India	Sanskrit	Devanagari	Bhāratam	Became available 2022	.in	Yes
xn--h2brj9c8c	.भारोत	India	Santali	Devanagari	Bharot	Became available 2022	.in	Yes
xn--mgbgu82a	.ڀارت	India	Sindhi	Arabic (Sindhi)	Bhārat	Became available 2022	.in	Yes
xn--mgba3a4f16a	.ایران	Iran	Persian	Arabic (Persian)	Īrān		.ir	No
xn--mgbtx2b	.عراق	Iraq	Arabic	Arabic (Arabic)	ʿIrāq	Not in use	.iq	No
xn--4dbrk0ce	.ישראל	Israel	Hebrew	Hebrew	Israel	Became available 2022	.il	Yes
xn--mgbayh7gpa	.الاردن	Jordan	Arabic	Arabic (Arabic)	al-Urdun		.jo	No
xn--80ao21a	.қаз	Kazakhstan	Kazakh	Cyrillic (Kazakh)	qaz		.kz	No
xn--q7ce6a	.ລາວ	Laos	Lao	Lao	Lao	Became available 2020	.la	Yes
xn--mix082f	.澳门	Macao	Chinese	Chinese (Simplified)	Ou^{3} mun^{4} / Àomén	Not in use	.mo	No
xn--mix891f	.澳門	Macao	Chinese	Chinese (Traditional)	Ou^{3} mun^{4} / Àomén	Became available 2020	.mo	No
xn--mgbx4cd0ab	.مليسيا	Malaysia	Malay	Arabic (Jawi)	Malaysīyā		.my	Yes
xn--mgbah1a3hjkrd	.موريتانيا	Mauritania	Arabic	Arabic (Arabic)	Mūrītāniyā		.mr	Yes
xn--l1acc	.мон	Mongolia	Mongolian	Cyrillic (Mongolian)	mon		.mn	Yes
xn--mgbc0a9azcg	.المغرب	Morocco	Arabic	Arabic (Arabic)	al-Maġrib		.ma	No
xn--d1alf	.мкд	North Macedonia	Macedonian	Cyrillic (Macedonian)	mkd		.mk	No
xn--mgb9awbf	.عمان	Oman	Arabic	Arabic (Arabic)	ʿUmān		.om	No
xn--mgbai9azgqp6j	.پاکستان	Pakistan	Urdu	Arabic (Urdu)	Pākistān		.pk	Yes
xn--ygbi2ammx	.فلسطين	Palestinian Authority	Arabic	Arabic (Arabic)	Filasṭīn		.ps	No
xn--wgbl6a	.قطر	Qatar	Arabic	Arabic (Arabic)	Qaṭar		.qa	No
xn--p1ai	.рф	Russia	Russian	Cyrillic (Russian)	rf		.ru	Yes
xn--mgberp4a5d4ar	.السعودية	Saudi Arabia	Arabic	Arabic (Arabic)	as-Suʿūdīya		.sa	Yes
xn--90a3ac	.срб	Serbia	Serbian	Cyrillic (Serbian)	srb		.rs	Yes
xn--yfro4i67o	.新加坡	Singapore	Chinese	Chinese (Simplified and Traditional)	Xīnjiāpō		.sg	Yes
xn--clchc0ea0b2g2a9gcd	.சிங்கப்பூர்	Singapore	Tamil	Tamil	Cinkappūr		.sg	Yes
xn--3e0b707e	.한국	South Korea	Korean	Hangul	Han-guk		.kr	Yes
xn--fzc2c9e2c	.ලංකා	Sri Lanka	Sinhala	Sinhala	Lanka		.lk	No
xn--xkc2al3hye2a	.இலங்கை	Sri Lanka	Tamil	Tamil	Ilaṅkai		.lk	No
xn--mgbpl2fh	.سودان	Sudan	Arabic	Arabic (Arabic)	Sūdān		.sd	No
xn--ogbpf8fl	.سورية	Syria	Arabic	Arabic (Arabic)	Sūriyya		.sy	No
xn--kprw13d	.台湾	Taiwan	Chinese	Chinese (Simplified)	Táiwān		.tw	Yes
xn--kpry57d	.台灣	Taiwan	Chinese	Chinese (Traditional)	Táiwān		.tw	Yes
xn--o3cw4h	.ไทย	Thailand	Thai	Thai	Thai		.th	Yes
xn--pgbs0dh	.تونس	Tunisia	Arabic	Arabic (Arabic)	Tūnis		.tn	Yes
xn--j1amh	.укр	Ukraine	Ukrainian	Cyrillic (Ukrainian)	ukr		.ua	No
xn--mgbaam7a8h	.امارات	UAE	Arabic	Arabic (Arabic)	Imārāt		.ae	No
xn--mgb2ddes	.اليمن	Yemen	Arabic	Arabic (Arabic)	al-Yaman	Not delegated	.ye	No

Table notes

== See also ==
- List of Internet top-level domains
- Country code top-level domain#Internationalized ccTLDs
- Punycode
