= .қаз =

Internet internationalized country-code top level domain for Kazakhstan

- Introduced: 2012
- TLD type: Internationalised (Cyrillic) country code top-level domain
- Status: Active
- Registry: KazNIC
- Sponsor: Association of IT Companies of Kazakhstan
- Intended use: Entities connected with Kazakhstan in the Cyrillic script
- Actual use: Sees some use in Kazakhstan
- Registration restrictions: None for second-level names; some restrictions for third-level names depending on which second-level name they are under
- Structure: Registrations are made directly at the second level, or at the third level beneath second-level categories
- DNS name: xn--80ao21a
- Registry website: NIC.kz

.қаз (abbreviation of Kazakh: Қазақстан, romanized: Qazaqstan) is the Internet internationalized country code top-level domain for Kazakhstan. It is used with web addresses using Cyrillic letters. It was launched in March 2012, when the first site, a test site ("тест.қаз") was activated.

The .қаз domain exists as a symbol of national identity, but its popularity remains low compared to the Latin .kz and international domains. The main reasons are technical inconveniences and users' habit of using Latin addresses.

Own second level domains are allowed, but there are also the following standardized second-level domains:

- .мем.қаз – public sector organizations
- .біл.қаз – education institutions
- .ком.қаз – commercial organizations
- .қау.қаз – non-profit organizations and projects
- .қор.қаз – defense
- .бай.қаз – communications enterprises, networks

Some second-level domains have been reserved in a prioritized manner, such as президент.қаз ("prezident.qaz"). Between May 1, 2012 to July 31, 2012, companies and trademark holders could apply for their names.

== See also ==
- Communications in Kazakhstan
- Media of Kazakhstan
- Proposed top-level domain
- .kz
- .бг
- .бел
- .мкд
- .мон
- .рф
- .срб
- .укр
