= .рф =

Cyrillic top-level Internet domain for Russia

- Introduced: 13 May 2010; 15 years ago
- TLD type: Internationalised (Cyrillic) country code top-level domain
- Status: Active
- Registry: Coordination Center for TLD RU/РФ
- Intended use: Entities connected with Russia
- Actual use: Active / Limited registration
- Registered domains: 760,688 (May 2025)
- Registration restrictions: Intended for Cyrillic domain names only.
- DNS name: xn--p1ai
- DNSSEC: no
- Registry website: кц.рф

The domain name .рф (abbreviation of Russian: Росси́йская Федера́ция, romanized: Rossíyskaya Federátsiya, .rf) is the Cyrillic country code top-level domain for the Russian Federation, in the Domain Name System (DNS) of the Internet. In the Domain Name System it has the ASCII DNS name xn--p1ai. The domain accepts only Cyrillic subdomain applications, and is the first Cyrillic implementation of the Internationalizing Domain Names in Applications (IDNA) system. The domain became operational on 13 May 2010. As of 2014 it is the most used internationalized country code top-level domain, with around 900,000 domain names.

== Character set ==
The Cyrillic letters рф stand for Российская Федерация, romanized as Rossiyskaya Federatsiya, lit. 'Russian Federation'. The domain has an ASCII representation of xn--p1ai derived as Punycode for use in the Domain Name System.

The domain is intended for Internet resources with names in the Russian language using Cyrillic.

A principle in the approval process of ICANN Generic Names Supporting Organization (GNSO) states that Cyrillic two-character top-level domains should not exclusively use characters that could be confused with Latin characters of identical or similar shapes—not just those containing the seven letters а, е, о, р, с, у and х, but originally also proposed ccTLDs such as .бг (Bulgaria) due to its visual similarity to .br, although in 2016 the top-level domain .бг was launched. As such, GNSO sought to avoid the direct transcription of "ru" into Cyrillic, "ру", and common abbreviations for Russia (Russian: Россия), such as "ро", in order to avoid confusion with the Latin ccTLDs .py (Paraguay) and .po (currently unassigned). In English sources .рф can be romanized as .rf, but the latter is not a valid domain for Russia. Later, other countries have won approval of two or three letter Cyrillic ccTLDs such as .укр, .срб, .мон, .қаз, .бел, .мкд and .бг.

== Early preparations ==
The preparation, development, and technical testing of the domain started in 2007 by registrar RU Center. The domain delegation process started in November 2009 as an application to ICANN under the new Fast Track IDN ccTLD process. The domain is expected to be launched in 2010. In preparation for a launch, RU Center opened a sunrise registration period for Russian trademark owners from 25 November 2009 to 25 March 2010. General public registrations are planned starting 20 April 2010 through June 2010 using a Dutch auction process, and at a fixed price beginning in July 2010.

In January 2010 ICANN announced that the domain was one of the first four new non-Latin ccTLDs to have passed the Fast Track String Evaluation within the domain application process.

In a press release in December 2007, Alexei Lesnikov of RU-Center suggested that an auction for domain names could be highly successful, as was the case with a similar domain name auction on the .su ccTLD.

With comparisons being made with an equivalent Chinese TLD of .中国, it was anticipated that take-up of a Russian Cyrillic TLD could outstrip demand for the Latin alphabet equivalent, .ru. As of 2014 however, .ru has five times as many registrations as .рф.

== First use ==
The top-level domain became operational on the Internet on 13 May 2010. The first two accessible sites were президент.рф (president) and правительство.рф (government).

== Related domains ==
The traditional country code top-level domain (ccTLD) for Russia, based on the ISO country codes, is ru. There is no direct mapping of subdomains between рф and ru, they are independent domains hosting potentially different resources. However, many resources may use URL redirection or DNS pointers to provide mapping between the name spaces. For example, the URLs президент.рф (prezident) redirects to kremlin.ru, and яндекс.рф (Yandex) redirects to yandex.ru.

== Second-level domains ==
The second-level domain names are registered directly with user-defined names, such as company names. There are no standardized category names (such as com or org) used on the second level. The second-level domain names are only intended to have Cyrillic characters, but some have Latin characters, or digits instead. For the third-level names, it is fairly common that "www" (Latin characters) are used, but most main company addresses do not use any third-level name.

== See also ==
- .ru
- .su domain (permits registration in Cyrillic)
- .eu domain (permits registration in Cyrillic)
- .бг
- .қаз
- .мкд
- .срб
- .укр
- Punycode
- Technical Center of Internet
- .рус (permits registration in Cyrillic)
