= .бел =

Cyrillic Internet country code top-level domain for Belarus

- Introduced: 2014
- TLD type: Internationalised (Cyrillic) country code top-level domain
- Status: active
- Intended use: Entities connected with Belarus
- Registered domains: 14,338 (28 September 2020)
- Registration restrictions: Intended for Cyrillic domain names; no policy is defined.
- DNS name: .xn--90ais
- Registry website: https://cctld.by/?site=bel

.бел (abbreviation of Belarusian: Беларусь, romanized: Belarus) is an approved internationalized country code top-level domain (IDN ccTLD) for Belarus. Activation of the domain was finished in late 2014. The Latin script domain for Belarus is .by.

== See also ==
- .by
- top-level domain
- .бг
- .қаз
- .мкд
- .рф
- .срб
- .укр
