= .срб =

Internet internationalized country code top-level domain for Serbia

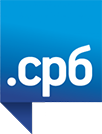
- Introduced: 2012
- TLD type: Internationalised (Cyrillic) country code top-level domain
- Status: Active
- Registry: RNIDS
- Sponsor: RNIDS
- Intended use: Entities connected with Serbia in the Cyrillic script
- Actual use: Limited use in Serbia
- Registered domains: 3,242 (May 2026)
- Registration restrictions: No policy defined
- Documents: General Terms and Conditions for Registration
- Dispute policies: Disputes
- IDN: Yes
- Registry website: рнидс.срб

.срб (romanized as .srb; abbreviation of Serbian: Србија, romanized: Srbija) is the Internationalised (Cyrillic) Internet country code top-level domain (IDN ccTLD) for Serbia. It has been active since May 3, 2011 while the process of registering has started on 27 January 2012.

The Serbian National Internet Domain Registry (RNIDS) has initiated on its forum (www.forum.rnids.rs) a public discussion on the Proposal of rules and processes for registering the Cyrillic domain ".срб".

The Proposal of rules and processes for registering the Cyrillic domain ".срб" is available on the forum of RNIDS. It regulates the registration of the sub-domain ".срб" and the reservation of other domains for the needs of RNIDS, the reservation of the ".срб" domain for the needs of the state, the reservation of the ".срб" domain based on the current .rs domain names and the allocation of the unique code to each and every reserved ".срб" domain.

The Rule book also determines the period for assigning the ".срб" domain according to the priority right, after which the period of free registration of the ".срб" domain will commence, based on the same or similar rules now applicable for the .rs domain.

".срб" has, in many fonts, a very similar appearance to the Latin alphanumeric .cp6, which is not registered as a TLD. Similarly proposed TLDs .бг (for Bulgaria) and .ελ (for the Greece) have been rejected or stalled because of this problem, but ".срб" has not. The general policy for internationalized TLDs is to require at least one of the letters in a TLD to not resemble a Latin letter; 6 is a numeric digit (not a Latin letter) and is not used in any TLDs. Furthermore, though б appears similar to a 6 in most Cyrillic alphabets, it does not in Serbian, where it more closely resembles Greek lowercase delta (δ), see the relevant section in the article on the letter б.

== See also ==
- .rs, a Latin top-level domain for Serbia.
- Country codes of Serbia
- National symbols of Serbia
- .бг
- .қаз
- .мкд
- .рф
- .укр
- .бел
