= .lk =

Internet country code top-level domain for Sri Lanka

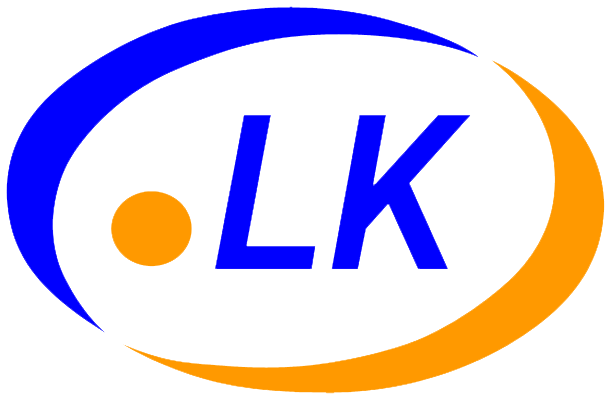
- Introduced: 15 June 1990; 36 years ago
- TLD type: Country code top-level domain
- Status: Active
- Registry: LK Domain Registry
- Sponsor: LK Domain Registry
- Intended use: Entities connected with Sri Lanka
- Actual use: Popular in Sri Lanka
- Registration restrictions: Registrants must provide clear justification for registering particular name; some third-level names restricted by category
- Structure: Registrations are made directly at the second level, or at the third level beneath second-level names
- Documents: Policy
- DNSSEC: Yes
- Registry website: www.domains.lk

.lk is the Internet country code top-level domain (ccTLD) for Sri Lanka. Foreign companies who do not have a local presence can only reserve their top-level and corresponding open second-level domains (either through the LK Domain Registry or agents). In order to register and use a name they must have a contact address in Sri Lanka (which may be obtained through an agent or law firm).

In October 2026, Domgate became the first registrar to connect to the LK Domain Registry via the Extensible Provisioning Protocol (EPP).

== Second-level domains ==
Registrations are taken at the second level and also at the third level beneath various categorised second level names. A second-level registration automatically blocks the name from registration by anybody else under any of the third-level names.

These second-level names are available for registrations within them:

Restricted registration:

- .gov.lk: Governmental departments of Sri Lanka (automatically reserves name at second level and under all other second level names)
- .ac.lk: Research and higher education institutions in Sri Lanka
- .sch.lk: Registered schools in Sri Lanka
- .net.lk: Licensed internet service providers in Sri Lanka
- .int.lk: International treaty organisations

Open registration:

- .com.lk: Commercial entities
- .org.lk: Noncommercial organisations
- .edu.lk: Educational sites
- .ngo.lk: Non-governmental organisations
- .soc.lk: Registered societies
- .web.lk: Web sites
- .ltd.lk: Limited liability companies
- .assn.lk: Associations
- .grp.lk: Groups of companies
- .hotel.lk: Hotels

== Internationalised top-level domains ==
.ලංකා
- Introduced: 19 August 2010; 16 years ago
- TLD type: Internationalised country code top-level domain
- Status: Active
- Registry: LK Domain Registry
- Sponsor: LK Domain Registry
- Intended use: Entities connected with Sri Lanka
- Actual use: Sees rare use in Sri Lanka
- Registration restrictions: Website must be in the Sinhala language.
- DNS name: xn--fzc2c9e2c

.இலங்கை
- Introduced: 19 August 2010; 16 years ago
- TLD type: Internationalised country code top-level domain
- Status: Active
- Registry: LK Domain Registry
- Sponsor: LK Domain Registry
- Intended use: Entities connected with Sri Lanka
- Actual use: Sees rare use in Sri Lanka
- Registration restrictions: Website must be in Tamil language.
- DNS name: xn--xkc2al3hye2a

In September 2010 two new internationalised top-level domains were registered for Sri Lanka. They became active during 2011.

- .ලංකා (for domain names in the Sinhala language)
- .இலங்கை (for domain names in the Tamil language)
