= Masr (domain name) =

Internet country-code top level domain for Egypt

مصر
- Introduced: 2010
- TLD type: Internationalized country code top-level domain
- Status: Active
- Registry: TE Data, InTouch, Vodafone Data and the Egyptian Universities Network (EUN)
- Intended use: Entities connected with Egypt
- Actual use: Limited use in Egypt. First site is موقع.وزارة-الاتصالات.مصر
- Dispute policies: Dispute Resolution
- DNS name: xn--wgbh1c
- Registry website: www.dotmasr.eg

مصر (lit. 'Egypt', romanized as masr) is the internationalized country code top-level domain (IDN ccTLD) in the Domain Name System (DNS) of the Internet for Egypt. Its ASCII DNS name is xn--wgbh1c, obtained by the Internationalizing Domain Names in Applications (IDNA) transcription method.

The domain was one of the first IDN ccTLDs installed in the DNS on 5 May 2010.

Egypt's traditional ccTLD is .eg.

The first website of this top-level domain was a site of the Egyptian Ministry of Communication and Information Technology. After the 2011 Egyptian Revolution, a website for a referendum was set up using this domain (استفتاء.مصر — literally, referendum[of].egypt).

== See also ==
- Top-level domain
- Punycode
