= .hk =

Top-level Internet domain for Hong Kong

- Introduced: 3 January 1990
- TLD type: Country code top-level domain
- Status: Active
- Registry: Hong Kong Internet Registration Corporation Ltd.
- Intended use: Entities connected with: British Hong Kong; (1990–1997): Hong Kong SAR; (1997–present)
- Actual use: Popular in Hong Kong
- Registration restrictions: Second-level registrations open to all Generic '.hk' domain categories; Specific third-level registrations require identity documents depending on varying rules for each sector; DNSSEC is not available on most local registries.
- Documents: Eligibility & required documents Registration policies & procedures Registration agreement
- Dispute policies: Dispute resolution policies & procedures (HKIRC); How to raise a dispute (HKDNR)
- Registry website: hkdnr.hk

.香港
- Introduced: 2011
- TLD type: Internationalised country code top-level domain
- Status: Active
- Registry: Hong Kong Internet Registration Corporation Ltd.
- Intended use: Entities connected with Hong Kong SAR
- Actual use: Used in Hong Kong
- Documents: See .hk
- Dispute policies: See .hk
- Registry website: hkdnr.hk

.hk is the country code top-level domain (ccTLD) for the Hong Kong Special Administrative Region. Introduced on 3 January 1990, it is administered by the Hong Kong Internet Registration Corporation (HKIRC).

== History ==
From the introduction of the domain in 1990 to 2002, the domain was administered by the Joint University Computer Centre (JUCC), which was incorporated in 1970 as a cooperative consortium of the information technology service centers of the eight government-funded tertiary institutions in Hong Kong. During this period, the Chinese University of Hong Kong was responsible for technical support, the University of Hong Kong coordinated fees, and the Hong Kong Polytechnic University was responsible for maintaining the accounts.

In 2002, by a Memorandum of Understanding with the government of Hong Kong, the Hong Kong Internet Registration Corporation (HKIRC) took over the administration of .hk from the Joint University Computer Centre. The Hong Kong Domain Name Registration Corporation Limited (HKDNR), a wholly owned subsidiary of HKIRC, is responsible for the day-to-day management of the domain registration service.

== Domains ==
".hk" domain names can be registered at both the second and third level. All domain names could contain alphanumeric characters and hyphens.

English	Chinese	Eligibility
.hk	.香港	Anyone (open registration)
.com.hk	.公司.香港	Commercial entities (licensed by IRD) in Hong Kong
.org.hk	.組織.香港	Societies (approved by HKPF), non-profit organisations and charitable organisation (approved by IRD), or statutory bodies (incorporated by LegCo) in Hong Kong
.net.hk	.網絡.香港	Network service providers licensed by the Communications Authority
.edu.hk	.教育.香港	Educational institutions registered with the Education Bureau
.gov.hk	.政府.香港	Government agencies of Hong Kong
.idv.hk	.個人.香港	Hong Kong identity card bearers

== Internationalised domains ==
A Chinese domain name must include at least one Chinese character but may also contain English letters. In contrast, an English domain name cannot contain any Chinese characters. Since mid-January 2011, Chinese domain names with the ".hk" extension (but not those ending in ".香港") have been unavailable for registration. Domains already registered under these categories can still be used and renewed.

On 25 June 2010, ICANN approved the use of the internationalised country code top-level domain .香港 (.xn--j6w193g) by HKIRC. This TLD was added to the DNS on 12 July 2010.

The pre-launch priority registration for .香港 was started on 22 February 2011. The first .香港 domain was activated on 23 March 2011. 香港 domain categories were opened for public registration since 31 May 2011.

== See also ==
- .mo (ccTLD for Macau)
- .cn (Mainland China)
- .tw (Taiwan also known as the Republic of China)
- Communications in Hong Kong
- Internationalized domain name
- Telecommunications industry in Hong Kong
