= .kz =

Internet country-code top level domain for Kazakhstan

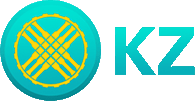
- Introduced: September 19, 1994; 32 years ago
- TLD type: Country code top-level domain
- Status: Active
- Registry: Kazakhstan Network Information Center (KazNIC) (Казахский центр сетевой информации)
- Sponsor: Association of IT Companies of Kazakhstan
- Intended use: Entities connected with Kazakhstan
- Actual use: Popular in Kazakhstan
- Registered domains: 168,530 (2022-09-30)
- Registration restrictions: None for second-level names; some restrictions for third-level names depending on which second-level name they are under
- Structure: Registrations are made directly at the second level, or at the third level beneath second-level categories
- Documents: Rules
- Dispute policies: Dispute resolution policy
- DNSSEC: Yes (since 2023)
- Registry website: NIC.kz

.kz is the Internet country code top-level domain (ccTLD) for Kazakhstan.

Registrations can be made directly at the second level or at the third level beneath categories which have specific restrictions, and are generally limited to Kazakhstan-related entities.

== .kz ==
=== Second-level domains ===
- .com.kz – Commercial organizations; registered trademark protection.
- .edu.kz – Licensed educational organizations.
- .gov.kz – Governmental organizations.
- .mil.kz – Ministry of Defense.
- .net.kz – Licensed networks of data communications.
- .org.kz – Nonprofit organizations.

==== Enforcement of Internet resources on hardware and software complexes ====
In March 2018, new Rules went into effect and since at least 2021, these rules are being enforced. Especially Rule 16 subsection 6 is being enforced:

16. Use of a domain name in the space of the Kazakhstan segment of the Internet is suspended when:

/.../
6) placement of Internet resources on hardware and software complexes outside territory of the Republic of Kazakhstan.

Footnote. Point 16 in the editorial office order of the Minister of Digital Development, Innovations and Aerospace Industry of the Republic of Kazakhstan of 28.09.2020 No. 354/HҚ (put into effect upon expiry of ten calendar days after the day of its first official publication).

Example: DNS for domain www.EXAMPLE.kz cannot point to a web page being hosted in a member country of the EU. In such a case, the registry for EXAMPLE.kz will be suspended a short period and then deleted.

==== Google ====
In June 2011, Google redirected all traffic from google.kz to google.com in response to a demand issued by the Kazakh Ministry of Communications and Information that requires all .kz domain names to operate on physical servers within the borders of Kazakhstan. Senior Vice President Bill Coughran said "creating borders on the web raises important questions for us not only about network efficiency but also about user privacy and free expression." By hosting google.kz only on servers inside Kazakhstan, "we would be helping to create a fractured Internet."

During the first half of 2017, google.kz has returned to be generally available.

== .қаз ==
A second country code top-level domain, .қаз ("qaz") for Kazakhstan is now active. It is used with web addresses using Cyrillic letters. It was launched in March 2012, when the first site, a test site (тест.қаз, "test.qaz"), was activated.

== See also ==
- Communications in Kazakhstan
- Internet in Kazakhstan
- Media of Kazakhstan
- Proposed top-level domain
- .бг
- .рф
- .срб
- .укр
