= .бг =

Internationalized country code top-level domain for Bulgaria

- Introduced: 12 July 2016
- TLD type: Internationalised (Cyrillic) country code top-level domain
- Status: Active
- Intended use: Entities connected with Bulgaria
- Actual use: Not yet widely used in Bulgaria
- Registration restrictions: Intended for Cyrillic domain names only; no firm policy yet defined
- DNS name: xn--90ae
- Registry website: http://имена.бг

.бг (abbreviation of Bulgarian: България, romanized: Bŭlgariya) is an internationalized country code top-level domain (IDN ccTLD) for Bulgaria. The ASCII DNS name of the domain would be xn--90ae, according to rules of the Internationalizing Domain Names in Applications procedures.

It has previously been rejected by ICANN twice, due to its visual similarity to Brazil's .br, but in 2014 an ICANN panel determined that .бг is not confusingly similar to ISO 3166-1 country codes. The panel compared the two Cyrillic characters in several fonts to the Latin br, bt, bs, BT and BF.

== History ==
- On 24 October 2007, UNINET, a Bulgarian association announced the intent to submit an application for creation of the .бг domain.
- On 23 June 2008, the government of Bulgaria officially announced its intent to operate the domain in a letter from Plamen Vachkov, chairman of the Bulgarian State Agency for Information Technology and Communication, to Paul Twomey, president and CEO of ICANN, after several months of discussions within the Internet Society – Bulgaria involving senior government ministers.
- On 18 May 2010 ICANN rejected the proposed domain on the grounds of visual similarities with the Brazilian ccTLD domain br. In June 2010 the Minister of Transport, Information Technology and Communications Aleksandar Tsvetkov confirmed in a radio interview that Bulgaria would file a second request for the same domain. Disapproval of the domain would mean lower interest and usage of Bulgaria's alternative IDNs than currently expected.
- On 10 January 2011 the Minister of Transport, Information Technology and Communications organized a round-table between all interested parties, where all agreed to continue with the application for .бг A poll has shown that .бгр has the second highest support, after .бг.
- In March 2011 ICANN rejected .бг a second time. Bulgarian authorities have gone ahead discussing other Cyrillic domains.
- In 2014 ICANN's Extended Process Similarity Review Panel (EPSRP) approved .бг.
- On 5 March 2016, the .бг domain was added to the Root Zone.
- On 25 June 2016 the ICANN board delegated the domain to Imena.BG Plc.
- As of 12 July 2016, the first Cyrillic domain http://имена.бг is accessible online.

== See also ==
- Proposed top-level domain
- .bg - Bulgaria's Latin top-level domain
- .қаз
- .мкд
- .рф
- .срб
- .укр
