= .укр =

Internationalized country code top-level domain

- Introduced: 2013
- TLD type: Internationalised (Cyrillic) country code top-level domain
- Status: Active
- Registry: UANIC
- Sponsor: UANIC
- Intended use: Entities connected with Ukraine (Cyrillic script)
- Registered domains: 13,923 (2024-02-27)
- Documents: Rules
- Dispute policies: Provisions on the Commission for Pretrial Resolution of Domain Disputes; Procedure for resolving domain disputes
- Registry website: UANIC

The domain name .укр (romanized as .ukr; abbreviation of Ukrainian: Україна, romanized: Ukrayina; Punycode .xn--j1amh) is an approved internationalized country code top-level domain (IDN ccTLD) for Ukraine. It is a common abbreviation used in Ukraine, as in Ukrbank and Ukrnafta.

== History ==
In June 2008 the ICANN approved a document that foresees the introduction of high-level domain names in Cyrillic and other national non-Latin alphabets.

On 17 November 2009, Ukraine initiated an application to ICANN for assignment of the Cyrillic top-level domain name 'укр'. Already in December 2008 the Company Center for Internet names of Ukraine had announced the registration of domain names in two new top-level domains 'укр' and 'блог' (transliterated: bloh). The full set of required documents was submitted to ICANN on 26 November 2009 by the Ukrainian Network Information Center (UNIC). Ukraine was one of the first countries that applied for the creation of domains in their native writing system, following Russia, Egypt and China.

The domain was expected to be available in the first half of 2010 since assignment of top-level domain takes about a month. In November 2009 UNIC Director Yuriy Honcharuk expected the new domain to start operating on the Internet in February–March 2010.

On 1 March 2011, ICANN announced that the .укр domain had passed string evaluation, the step before delegation.

.укр was approved by the ICANN Board on 28 February 2013. The zone was added to the root servers on 19 March 2013. The very first two domains were тест.укр (xn--e1aybc.xn--j1amh) and уміц.укр (xn--l1ank7d.xn--j1amh). In Ukrainian "тест" stands for "test", and "уміц" stands for "Український Мережевий Інформаційний Центр", Ukrainian Network Informational Centre. According to UNIC Director Honcharuk, registration of .укр domain names could begin in the summer of 2013. Registration is allowed both in Russian and in Ukrainian. The .укр registration of domains of Ukrainian government agencies in the Ukrainian language began on 22 August 2013. On 21 August 2013 the first such site got active — президент.укр (president.ukr). Before the end of 2013, many sites were active.

=== Doubts about registration ===
In June 2008 President Oleksandr Olshansky of the Ukrainian Internet company Internet Invest considered it unlikely that .укр would be assigned by ICANN. According to Olshansky the existing rules for non-Latin domain names stipulate that at least one letter should differ in the shape from the corresponding Latin character. The country name Україна (Ukraine) does not contain any letter whose shape does not exist in any Latin language. In November 2009 UNIC Director Yuriy Honcharuk had stated there were no technical issues preventing the assignment of this Cyrillic domain. Latin ccTLDs contain two letters, whereas .укр contains three, which makes it recognizably distinct, especially with the lack of any such suffix as ".ykp".

== See also ==
- .бел
- .ua
- Proposed top-level domain
- .бг
- .қаз
- .мкд
- .рф
- .срб
