= .jo =

Internet country code top-level domain for Jordan

- Introduced: 23 November 1994 (in root zone)
- TLD type: Country code top-level domain
- Status: Active
- Registry: Ministry of Digital Economy And Entrepreneurship
- Sponsor: NITC
- Intended use: Entities connected with Jordan
- Actual use: Used by Jordanian companies and organizations
- Registered domains: 5,686 (2022-12-17)
- Registration restrictions: Must submit official documents
- Structure: Registrations are at second level or at third level beneath second level labels
- Documents: Registration policy
- Dispute policies: Resolved by Jordanian Law
- Registry website: DNS

.jo is the country code top-level domain (ccTLD) for Jordan. A local contact is required to register a domain name under .jo. It used to be administered by the NITC and is now administered by Jordan's Ministry of Digital Economy and Entrepreneurship.

Jordan also has an internationalized country code top-level domain, الاردن.

== Structure ==
Registration directly at second level, under .jo is possible, but there is a number of second level domains used for registrations as well. Registration under the IDN الاردن. is open for all public and private organisations and companies.

List of second level domains
Second level domain	Intended use
.com.jo	Commercial organizations
.edu.jo	Universities and educational institutions
.sch.jo	Public and private schools
.net.jo	Networks and Internet service providers
.org.jo	Non-commercial or not-for-profit organisations
.gov.jo	Governmental entities
.mil.jo	Military entities
.per.jo	Individuals and personal use
.phd.jo	PhD holders
