= .mr =

Internet country code top-level domain for Mauritania

- Introduced: 24 April 1996
- TLD type: Country code top-level domain
- Status: Active
- Registry: NIC-Mauritanie
- Sponsor: University of Nouakchott
- Intended use: Entities connected with Mauritania
- Actual use: Popular in Mauritania
- Registration restrictions: Open to Mauritanian citizens and residents, as well as legal entities with local representation.
- Structure: Registrations are taken directly at second level; some second level domains available for registration at third level
- Registry website: nic.mr

.mr is the Internet country code top-level domain (ccTLD) for Mauritania.

.mr domains can be registered by Mauritanian citizens, residents, and legal entities with a local representation.

== History ==
The management of the Internet Top-Level-Domain Names in Mauritania was delegated by ICANN to the Faculty of Science and Technology (FST) of the University of Nouakchott in April 1996. As the country was not connected to the internet at that time, IRD (Montpellier, France) hosted the .mr name servers.

Once the required infrastructure is established by April 2000, Network Information Center was created within the Faculty of Science and Technology and started hosting the .mr name servers.

== Structure ==
Registrations are taken directly at the second level, under .mr. However, a number of second level domains exists for different purposes.

List of second level domains
Second level domain	Intended use
gov.mr	Governmental entities
org.mr	Non-profit and non-governmental organisations
edu.mr	Public or private educational institutions
perso.mr	Individuals

== Internationalized domain name ==
On 27 January 2019, ICANN approved a request for delegation of the موريتانيا. internationalised country-code top-level domain representing Mauritania in Arabic script to Université de Nouakchott Al Aasriya. As of December 2022, no information regarding the registration under this TLD is available on the registry website.
