= .dz =

Top-level Internet domain for Algeria

- Introduced: 3 January 1994
- TLD type: Country code top-level domain
- Status: Active
- Registry: DZ NIC
- Sponsor: CERIST
- Intended use: Entities connected with Algeria
- Actual use: Fairly popular in Algeria
- Registered domains: 20,573 (2026-06-08)
- Registration restrictions: Must have Algerian presence; name must be related to company or organization name or trademark
- Structure: Registrations are taken directly at second level or at third level beneath some second-level labels
- Documents: www.nic.dz/docs
- Dispute policies: UDRP
- Registry website: www.nic.dz

.dz is the country code top-level domain (ccTLD) for Algeria (from Dzayer, the local name for Algeria).

== Management ==
It is administered by the DZ Network Internet Center, a subdivision of CERIST (Centre de Recherche sur l'Information Scientifique et Technique).

To apply for a .dz domain name, one must be an entity established in Algeria, have legal representation in Algeria, or possess a document justifying the name ownership rights in the country.

Currently, NIC.DZ charges 1000 Algerian dinars per year for a domain (about US$7.4).

== Second-level domains ==
Registrations are taken directly at the second level, or at the third level beneath these names:

Domain	Intended users
.com.dz	Commercial entities
.gov.dz	Governmental entities
.org.dz	Non-governmental organizations
.edu.dz	Education associations
.asso.dz	Approved associations
.pol.dz	Political parties
.art.dz	Arts
.net.dz	Network providers/operators and entities operating in other back-end internet services
.tm.dz	Entities, residing abroad, which possess protected trademarks covered in Algeria and having no document justifying an activity or presence in Algeria.
.soc.dz	Natural persons, residing in Algeria, who possess protected trademarks in Algeria and do not exercise a commercial activity (not having Algerian Trade certificate)

== Second top-level domain ==
الجزائر.
- Introduced: 2011
- TLD type: Internationalized country code top-level domain
- Status: Active
- Intended use: Entities connected with Algeria (Arabic script)
- Actual use: Rare use in Algeria.
- Registered domains: 59 (2024-12-14)
- Documents: مركزأسماءالنطاقات.الجزائر/docs
- DNS name: .xn--lgbbat1ad8j
- Registry website: مركزأسماءالنطاقات.الجزائر

A second, internationalised top-level domain is used for Algeria, intended for domain names in the local language, using Arabic characters: الجزائر. It was registered in 2011 and is represented as .xn--lgbbat1ad8j for the DNS name.

== See also ==
- Internet in Algeria
