= .na =

Internet country code top-level domain for Namibia

- Introduced: 8 May 1991
- TLD type: Country code top-level domain
- Status: Active
- Registry: Omadhina Internet Services (cc)
- Sponsor: Namibian Network Information Centre (cc) (NA-NiC)
- Intended use: Entities connected with Namibia
- Actual use: Fairly popular in Namibia
- Registration restrictions: None
- Structure: Registrations are taken at the second level and at the third level beneath various second-level labels
- Documents: Draft Registrar Accreditation Agreement; Acceptable Use Policy
- Dispute policies: CoCCA Complaint Resolution Service
- DNSSEC: yes
- Registry website: NA-NiC; Omadhina (Registry Operator)

.na is the Internet country code top-level domain (ccTLD) for Namibia corresponding to the two letter code from the ISO-3166 standard.

The registry accredits both Namibian and foreign registrars. Registrars access the Registry and register domains using either a web-based GUI or the industry standard EPP protocol.

The domain was established on 8 May 1991. The ccTLD manager is NA-NiC (Namibian Network Information Centre). The Namibian Parliament passed a Communications Act in 2009 containing various provisions regarding the ccTLD; however, as of the end of 2017, they had not yet entered into force.

Registrations are available at both the second level or at the third level beneath various names that include some apparently redundant choices (e.g., both .co.na and .com.na for commercial entities).

== Domain registration costs ==
Domain registration prices to the end-user are now set by registrars in competition with each other. Wholesale prices (the cost to the registrars) depend on the level at which a registration is made (i.e. whether at second-level or a third-level registration) and also whether the registrant is domestic or foreign. The second-level is considered 'premium', so the cheapest domains would be a registration by a local organisation at third-level (such as the NamNumbers telephone directory at TELECOM.COM.NA) whilst the highest prices are paid by non-Namibian entities registering at the second-level (such as BRITISHCOUNCIL.NA).

NA-NiC is a member of the Council of Country Code Administrators and uses their Dispute Resolution.

== Secure DNS ==
.na is an early adopter of the Domain Name System Security Extensions, with the .na root zone having been signed with DNSSEC since 1 September 2009.
