= Paul Twomey =

Australian businessman and public policy executive

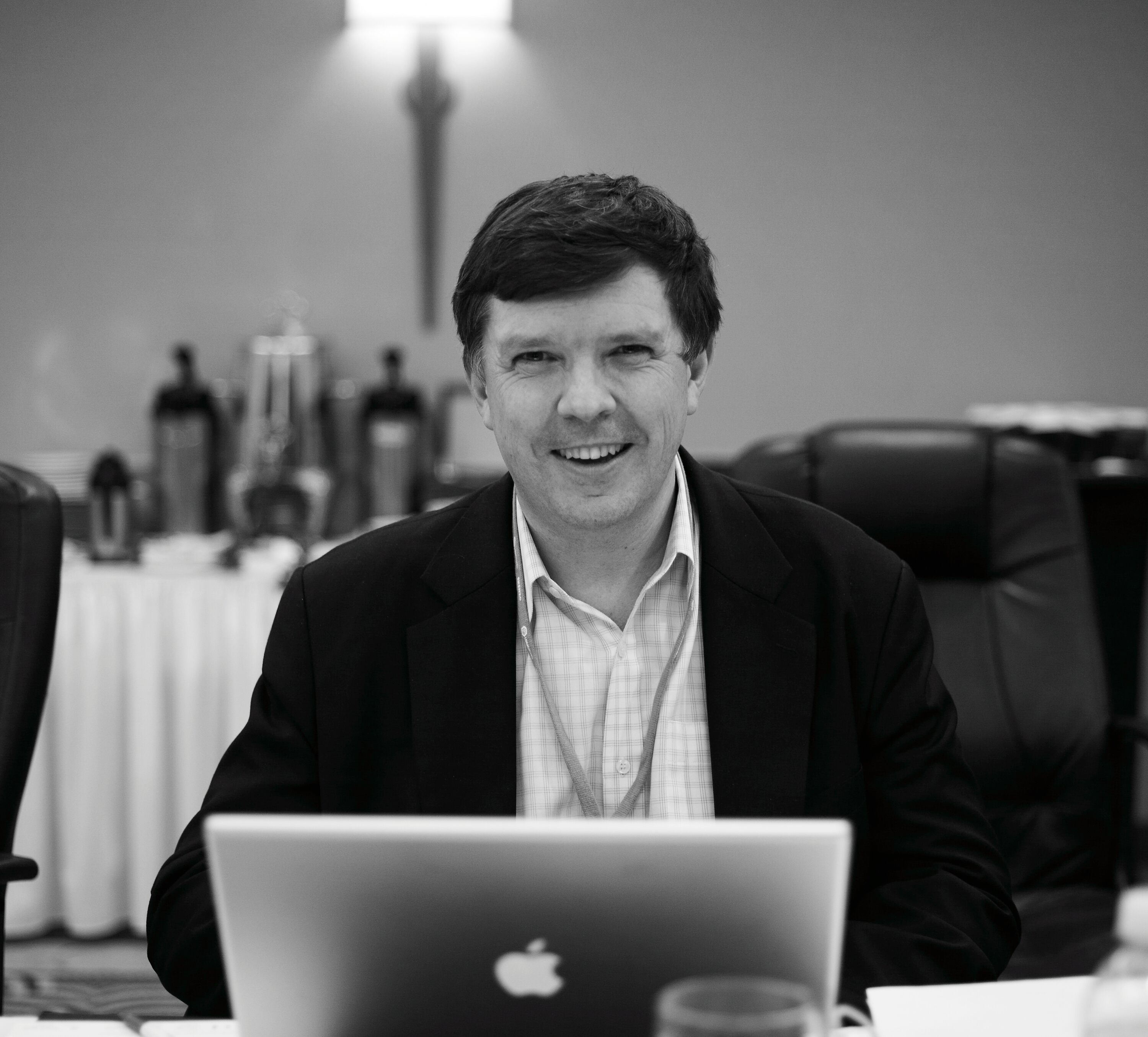
- Occupations: Businessman; public policy executive
- Known for: Co-founder of STASH

Paul Twomey is an Australian businessman and public policy executive. Twomey is co-founder of STASH, the secure digital storage and content sharing company. He is one of the founding figures of the Internet Corporation for Assigned Names and Numbers (ICANN), the international non-profit organization that coordinates many of the key functions of the global Internet. Twomey was the original chair of its Governmental Advisory Committee (1998–2003) and CEO (2003–10). A former McKinsey & Company consultant (1989–94) he was a senior executive at the Australian Trade Commission (Austrade 1994–97) and the chief executive of the Australian National Office for the Information Economy (NOIE 1998–2000), and CEO of Argo Pacific, a high-level Internet and cybersecurity advisory firm. He serves as the founding chairman of the Cybergreen Institute, a global non-profit organization that helps improve the health of the global cyber ecosystem.

Twomey was appointed chief executive officer of the National Office for the Information Economy (NOIE) in 1997, a Commonwealth Government unit responsible for developing Internet policy. His involvement with ICANN began at this time. Subsequently, he chaired the ICANN Government Advisory Committee, which served as the organisation's liaison with world governments. Following his departure from NOIE, Twomey created a consultancy with Ira Magaziner (Domestic Policy Adviser to former US President Bill Clinton) called Argo P@cific. He continued to serve on the ICANN GAC until November 2002, through an ongoing posting as external advisor to Australia's Commonwealth Government.

On 27 March 2003 he was elected to the position of CEO at ICANN. In an indication of the importance of ICANN's role, the International Herald Tribune and the New York Times have described Twomey as “The Internet’s Chief Operating Officer.” On 2 March 2009, during the opening ceremony of ICANN's 34th international meeting in Mexico City, Twomey mentioned that he would be leaving ICANN in June while remaining as Senior President until the end of the year. His name has recently been mentioned in relation to the Australian Government's proposed National Broadband Network.

He is a board member of the Atlantic Council of the United States; the founding chair of the World Economic Forum's Global Agenda Council on the Future of the Internet; a commissioner of the Global Information Infrastructure Commission; and was a member of the advisory board of the United Nations’ Digital He@lth Initiative. He serves as the founding chairman of the Cybergreen Institute, a global non-profit organization that helps improve the health of the global cyber ecosystem. Paul Twomey is also a distinguished fellow at the Centre for International Governance Innovation where he focuses on Internet governance, e-commerce and cyber security.

Twomey received the 2017 Communications Quality & Reliability (CQR) Chairman's Award from IEEE's technical committee.

Twomey holds a Bachelor of Arts degree from University of Queensland, a Master of Arts from Pennsylvania State University (Political Science and International Relations) and a PhD from Cambridge University (International Relations).
