= .eg =

Latin alphabet Internet country code top-level domain for Egypt

- Introduced: 30 November 1990
- TLD type: Country code top-level domain
- Status: Active
- Registry: Egyptian Universities Network
- Sponsor: Egyptian Universities Network
- Intended use: Entities connected with Egypt
- Actual use: Popular in Egypt
- Structure: Registrations are at the second level, and at the third level beneath various second-level labels
- DNSSEC: No
- Registry website: domain.eg

.eg is the Latin alphabet country code top-level domain (ccTLD) for Egypt. Any entity who wants to register a domain name ending with .eg must have a local representative or the domain name has to be hosted on Egyptian DNS servers. Egypt's Arabic alphabet ccTLD is .مصر.

== Second-level domains ==
There are several second-level domains. Registrations are possible at the second level (directly under .eg) or at the third level beneath these names, with required documents sometimes differing depending on the one selected.

- .ac.eg: Academic sites.
- .com.eg: Commercial sites.
- .edu.eg: Educational sites.
- .egregistry.eg: top-level domain services
- .eun.eg: Egyptian Universities Network.
- .gov.eg: Governmental sites.
- .info.eg: Information sector.
- .mil.eg: Military sites.
- .name.eg: Personal "name" websites.
- .net.eg: Networking and IT services.
- .org.eg: Egyptian non-governmental organizations.
- .sci.eg: Scientific sites.
- .sport.eg: Sports sites.
- .tv.eg: Visual media.

== Historical event ==
During the 2011 Egyptian protests, the domain was shut down by the government.
