= .kr =

Top-level Internet domain for South Korea

- Introduced: 29 September 1986; 40 years ago
- TLD type: Country code top-level domain
- Status: Active
- Registry: KRNIC (KISA)
- Sponsor: KISA
- Intended use: Entities connected with South Korea
- Actual use: Popular in South Korea
- Registered domains: 1,080,682 (2024-05-31)
- Registration restrictions: Registrants must have a local presence within South Korea; varying restrictions exist for registration under different second-level names.
- Structure: Registrations are only allowed at the third level beneath second-level domains (.co.kr, .or.kr, ...) for standard domain names while internationalized domain names must be registered at the second level.
- Documents: Policies
- IDN: Yes
- Registry website: krnic.or.kr

.한국
- Introduced: 2011
- TLD type: Internationalized country code top-level domain
- Status: Active
- Intended use: Entities connected with South Korea in the Hangul script
- Actual use: Fairly popular in South Korea
- Registered domains: 14,706 (2024-05-31)
- Registration restrictions: Registrants must have a local presence within South Korea
- Structure: Domain names contain Korean Hangul syllables, basic Latin alphabet, numbers or hyphens, and are registered at the second level.
- DNS name: xn--3e0b707e
- IDN: Only

.kr is the Internet country code top-level domain (ccTLD) for South Korea. Registrations are processed via registration agents.

== History ==
From September 2006, it became possible to register domain names directly under .kr (although this is currently only possible for internationalized domain names).

Trademark holders and public bodies benefited from an "early registration period", after which the owners of .kr third-level domains had priority to get the corresponding second-level domains.

Period	Time	Eligibility
Sunrise I	18 September – 20 November 2006	Governmental Bodies only
Sunrise II	21 November 2006 – 27 February 2007	A holder of 3rd level .kr domain; The registered 3rd level domain and the 3rd level domain should be registered before 13 March 2006; The full name of registered trademark using same alphabetical order
Landrush	28 March – 1 April 2007	Anyone or any business entity who has an address in the territory
General Registration	From 19 April 2007	First-come first-served basis

In 2011 a new top-level domain was registered for South Korea, intended for domain names in the local language. The top-level domain is 대한민국 domain names and working sites became active during 2011.

== Domains and subdomains ==
Domains and Subdomains	Areas	Registration qualifications
.kr	Commercial	Organizations or individuals
.co.kr	Commercial	Organizations or individuals
.ne.kr	Network	Organizations or individuals
.or.kr	Non-commercial	Organizations or individuals
.re.kr	Research	Organizations or individuals
.pe.kr	Personal	Individuals
.go.kr	Government	Administration, Legislation and Judicature
.mil.kr	Military	Military organizations
.ac.kr	Colleges or universities (academy)	Colleges or universities
.hs.kr	High schools	High schools
.ms.kr	Middle schools	Middle schools
.es.kr	Elementary schools	Elementary schools
.sc.kr	Schools	Other education organizations
.kg.kr	Kindergartens	Kindergartens
.seoul.kr	Seoul	Organizations or individuals that have a connection with the relevant areas (Note: Two-syllable short names of upper level local autonomies (provinces or provincial-level cities).)
.busan.kr	Busan	Organizations or individuals that have a connection with the relevant areas
.daegu.kr	Daegu	Organizations or individuals that have a connection with the relevant areas
.incheon.kr	Incheon	Organizations or individuals that have a connection with the relevant areas
.gwangju.kr	Gwangju	Organizations or individuals that have a connection with the relevant areas
.daejeon.kr	Daejeon	Organizations or individuals that have a connection with the relevant areas
.ulsan.kr	Ulsan	Organizations or individuals that have a connection with the relevant areas
.gyeonggi.kr	Gyeonggi Province	Organizations or individuals that have a connection with the relevant areas
.gangwon.kr	Gangwon Province	Organizations or individuals that have a connection with the relevant areas
.chungbuk.kr	North Chungcheong Province (Chungbuk)	Organizations or individuals that have a connection with the relevant areas
.chungnam.kr	South Chungcheong Province (Chungnam)	Organizations or individuals that have a connection with the relevant areas
.jeonbuk.kr	North Jeolla Province (Jeonbuk) (Note: Jeolla's Hangul spelling is 전라 (Jeon-la) but the current romanization of Korean transcribes actual pronunciation, so the region is romanized as Jeolla. In the Korean phonology, the /nl/ sequence should be assimilated to [ll] or [nn]. However, the original [n] phoneme is preserved in Jeonbuk and Jeonnam, the short names for the North and South Jeolla Provinces.)	Organizations or individuals that have a connection with the relevant areas
.jeonnam.kr	South Jeolla Province (Jeonnam)	Organizations or individuals that have a connection with the relevant areas
.gyeongbuk.kr	North Gyeongsang Province (Gyeongbuk)	Organizations or individuals that have a connection with the relevant areas
.gyeongnam.kr	South Gyeongsang Province (Gyeongnam)	Organizations or individuals that have a connection with the relevant areas
.jeju.kr	Jeju Province	Organizations or individuals that have a connection with the relevant areas
한글.kr (Note: Internationalized domain names (IDNs) under .kr. IDNs contains Korean Hangul only plus optional numbers and hyphens.)	unlimited	Organizations or individuals
.한국 (Note: Internationalized domain names (IDNs) under .한국 (Punycode: .xn--3e0b707e; Revised Romanization of Korean: .Hanguk). IDNs contains Korean Hangul only plus optional numbers and hyphens.)	unlimited	Organizations or individuals

=== Defunct domains and subdomains ===
Domains and Subdomains	Areas	Reasons for cessation
.pusan.kr	Busan (Pusan)	Revision of the Korean romanization (Note: The government has changed the official Korean romanization from its own variant of McCune–Reischauer to the current scheme in 2000. Hyphens (-), apostrophes (') and breves (˘) were omitted in defunct subdomains for autonomous regions.)
.taegu.kr	Daegu (Taegu)	Revision of the Korean romanization
.inchon.kr	Incheon (Inch'ŏn)	Revision of the Korean romanization
.kwangju.kr	Gwangju (Kwangju)	Revision of the Korean romanization
.taejon.kr	Daejeon (Taejŏn)	Revision of the Korean romanization
.kyonggi.kr	Gyeonggi-do (Kyŏnggi)	Revision of the Korean romanization
.kangwon.kr	Gangwon-do (Kangwon)	Revision of the Korean romanization
.chonbuk.kr	Jeollabuk-do (Chŏnbuk)	Revision of the Korean romanization
.chonnam.kr	Jeollanam-do (Chŏnnam)	Revision of the Korean romanization
.kyongbuk.kr	Gyeongsangbuk-do (Kyŏngbuk)	Revision of the Korean romanization
.kyongnam.kr	Gyeongsangnam-do (Kyŏngnam)	Revision of the Korean romanization
.cheju.kr	Jeju-do (Cheju)	Revision of the Korean romanization
.nm.kr	Network	Changed to the .ne.kr

== Domain hacks ==
.kr domains are sometimes used as domain hacks such as flic.kr, an alternative address for Flickr.

== New generic top level domains registered by South Korean organizations or individuals ==
- .doosan: A new brand gTLD for the Doosan Group.
- .hyundai: A new brand gTLD for the Hyundai Motor Group.
- .kia: A new brand gTLD for Kia Motors.
- .samsung: A new brand gTLD for the Samsung Group.
- .lotte: A new brand gTLD for the Lotte Group.
- .닷넷 (.xn--t60b56a; .dat-net): A new technology gTLD. Korean Hangul transliteration of English "dotnet."
- .닷컴 (.xn--mk1bu44c; .dat-keom): A new technology gTLD. Korean Hangul transliteration of English "dotcom."
- .삼성 (.xn--cg4bki; .Samseong): A new brand gTLD for the Samsung Group.

== See also ==
- .kp: The top-level domain for North Korea
- Communications in South Korea
