= .qa =

Internet country-code top level domain for Qatar

- Introduced: 12 June 1996
- TLD type: Country code top-level domain
- Status: Active
- Registry: Qatar Domains Registry
- Sponsor: Communications Regulatory Authority
- Intended use: Entities connected with Qatar
- Actual use: Fairly popular in Qatar
- Registered domains: 21,612 (July 2019)
- Registration restrictions: Registration must occur through an accredited registrar
- Structure: Country code top-level domain and second-level domains are available
- Dispute policies: Complaints
- Registry website: www.domains.qa/en

.qa is the Internet country code top-level domain (ccTLD) for State of Qatar.

== History ==
The .qa country code top-level domain (ccTLD) for Qatar has been managed by the Qatar Domains Registry (QDR), under the oversight of the Communications Regulatory Authority (CRA). Initially, the registry held a "sunrise" period prior to public availability, which allowed trademark holders and government entities to secure their Qatar-specific domain names.

Public registration of .qa domains began in September 2011, with domain names offered through a mix of local and international accredited registrars. By 2014, thirteen registrars had been accredited by the QDR, including both international and local entities such as Qtel, IP Mirror, MarkMonitor, and DomainMonster.

However, a significant policy shift occurred at the end of 2024, when the CRA discontinued the renewal and issuance of registrar licenses to international companies. The regulatory framework was amended to ensure that only companies legally registered within the State of Qatar are eligible to become accredited domain registrars.

In October 2026, the CRA informed registrars that, from the launch of a new registry system planned for 22 October 2026, new registrations under .qa would be subject to the same eligibility rules as .com.qa, such as holding a Qatari trade licence or a trademark registered in Qatar; until then, .qa had been open to any applicant. Names registered before the launch would continue to be renewed without the new check, but any later change to their registration details, including contact or nameserver updates, would bring them under the new rules.

The Qatar Domains Registry manages a variety of domain extensions under the .qa namespace, including:

- Publicly available through registrars: .qa, .com.qa, .net.qa, .name.qa, and the Arabic IDN .قطر (represented in Punycode as .xn--wgbl6a).
- Reserved and managed directly by QDR: .gov.qa, .mil.qa, .org.qa, .edu.qa, and .sch.qa.

Qatar was among the first countries globally to offer domain names in the Arabic script.

== Second-level domains ==
- .com.qa – Commercial organisations; registered trademarks.
- .edu.qa – Licensed higher educational organisations in Qatar.
- .sch.qa – Licensed private and public schools in Qatar.
- .gov.qa – Governmental organisations.
- .mil.qa – Ministry of State for Defense Affairs and Qatar Armed Forces.
- .net.qa – Licensed networks of data communications.
- .org.qa – Nonprofit organisations.
