= .py =

Internet country-code top level domain for Paraguay

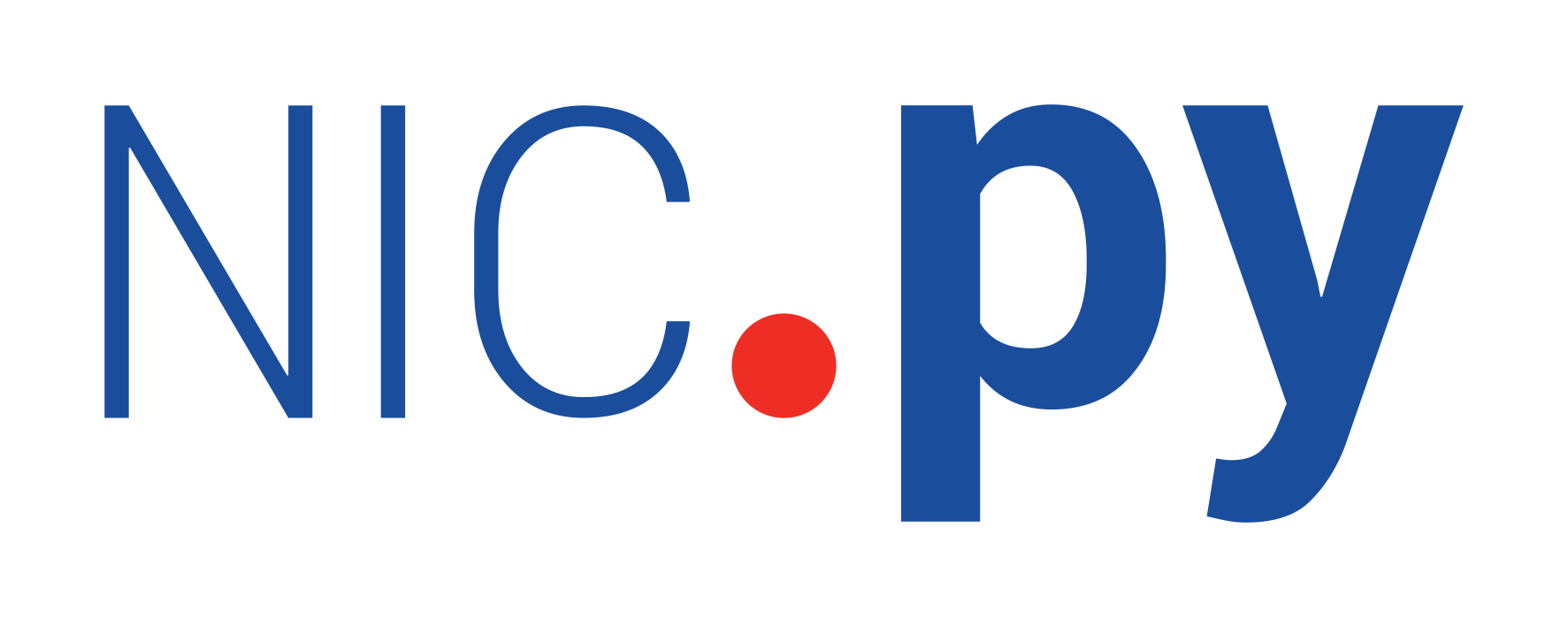
- Introduced: 9 September 1991
- TLD type: Country code top-level domain
- Status: Active
- Registry: Network Information Center - Paraguay (NIC-PY)
- Sponsor: Centro Nacional de Computación, Universidad Nacional de Asunción
- Intended use: Entities connected with Paraguay
- Actual use: Fairly popular in Paraguay; Some websites relating to the Python programming language.
- Registration restrictions: Second-level registrations prohibited; must have a contact in Paraguay; subdomains have various restrictions; all applications subject to approval by registry
- Structure: Registrations are at third level beneath second-level labels
- Registry website: NIC.py

.py is the Internet country code top-level domain (ccTLD) for Paraguay.

== Second-level domains ==
- com.py
- coop.py
- edu.py
- mil.py
- gov.py
- org.py
- net.py
- una.py
