= .dm =

Top-level Internet domain for Dominica

- Introduced: 3 September 1991
- TLD type: Country code top-level domain
- Status: Active
- Registry: Uniregistry
- Sponsor: DotDM Corporation
- Intended use: Entities connected with Dominica
- Actual use: Gets a little bit of use in Dominica
- Registered domains: 986 (31 December 2021)
- Registration restrictions: None
- Structure: Registrations are taken directly at second level; third-level names in .com.dm, .net.dm and .org.dm are included automatically upon registration
- Documents: Registration agreement
- Dispute policies: Dispute policy
- DNSSEC: Yes
- Registry website: nic.dm

.dm is the Internet country code top-level domain (ccTLD) for the Commonwealth of Dominica in the eastern Caribbean. Registrants of a second-level .dm domain get the corresponding third-level names within .com.dm, .net.dm and .org.dm automatically included. There are no restrictions on who can register these names, but they are not very heavily used.

One example of a ".dm" web property is a URL shortener, play.dm, used exclusively by Playdom, which is an example of domain hacking.

== See also ==
- Internet in Dominica
