= .lv =

Internet country code top-level domain for Latvia

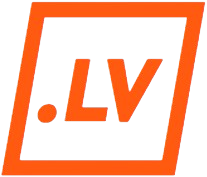
- Introduced: April 29, 1993; 33 years ago
- TLD type: Country code top-level domain
- Status: Active
- Registry: Institute of Mathematics and Computer Science
- Sponsor: University of Latvia
- Intended use: Entities connected with Latvia
- Actual use: Popular in Latvia
- Registration restrictions: None (some subdomains may have restrictions)
- Structure: Registrations are accepted directly at the second level and also at the third level beneath various second-level labels
- Documents: Policies
- Dispute policies: Dispute resolution policy
- DNSSEC: Yes
- Registry website: NIC.lv

Logo of the Latvian NIC

.lv is the Internet country code top-level domain (ccTLD) for Latvia. It was introduced on 29 April 1993, two years after the country's restoration of full independence.

Registration is permitted at the second level, and this is the form of registration currently encouraged by the registry; however, registrations are also accepted at the third level beneath a number of subdomains:

- .com.lv - commercial entities
- .edu.lv - educational institutions
- .gov.lv - government and semi-government entities.
- .org.lv - various forms of affiliation groups
- .mil.lv - defense/military entities of Latvia
- .id.lv - individuals
- .net.lv - network infrastructure providers
- .asn.lv - associations
- .conf.lv - conferences and exhibitions requiring short duration Internet connectivity

Registration is open to foreigners, though the dispute policy says that precedence is generally given to domestic users. There does not appear to be much non-Latvian use of this TLD; exceptions include a few sites apparently using it to suggest Las Vegas—much as .la is used for Los Angeles—or "love"—as in "my.lv", "we.lv", or "true.lv"—and "live"—as in "xbx.lv" used by Microsoft for shortening links to their Xbox Live service—but these types of uses are not widespread.

Internationalized domain names may also be registered.
