= .sy =

Internet country code top-level domain for Syria

- Introduced: 20 February 1996
- TLD type: Country code top-level domain
- Status: Active
- Registry: National Authority for IT Services
- Sponsor: Ministry of Communications and Information Technology
- Intended use: Entities connected with Syria
- Registration restrictions: None
- Structure: Registrations are directly at second level, or at third level beneath various second-level names
- Documents: Rules
- Registry website: naits.gov.sy/category/4

.sy is the Internet country code top-level domain (ccTLD) for Syria. The registry is operated by the National Authority for IT Services (NAITS).

== Second-level domains ==
There are several reserved second-level domains. They are:

- .edu.sy (educational institutions)
- .gov.sy (Government of Syria and government agencies)
- .net.sy (network operator/providers)
- .mil.sy (Syrian Armed Forces)
- .com.sy (commercial entities)
- .org.sy (nonprofit organisations)
- .news.sy (news agencies)
