= .mk =

Internet country-code top-level domain for North Macedonia

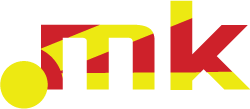
- Introduced: 23 September 1993
- TLD type: Country code top-level domain
- Status: Active
- Registry: MARnet
- Sponsor: MARnet
- Intended use: Entities connected with North Macedonia
- Actual use: Popular in North Macedonia
- Registered domains: 29,938 (2022-12-17)
- Registration restrictions: Generally None; Macedonian Local Presence not required; Some specific subdomains have varying restrictions
- Structure: Names are usually at third level beneath names like .com.mk and .org.mk, since 2008 MARnet started registering .mk domains
- Registry website: MARnet; marCOM

Logo of MARnet, which administers the domain

.mk is the Internet country code top-level domain (ccTLD) for North Macedonia. It is administered by the Macedonian Academic Research Network (MARnet).

== Registering .mk domains ==
Anyone can register a .mk domain. Registration is possible directly at the second level without any restrictions. Registrations under a number of second level domains are also possible, however those use of those domains are restricted to certain entities.

== Structure ==
List of second level domains
Second level domain	Intended use
.com.mk	Commercial and professional entities
.net.mk	Commercial and professional entities
.inf.mk	Commercial and professional entities
.gov.mk	Government entities
.edu.mk	Educational and research institutions
.org.mk	nonprofit organizations, civic associations and foundations, political parties, trade unions, public health institutions, funds and foreign embassies

== Cyrillic domain ==
The Internationalized Cyrillic country code top-level domain .мкд was officially approved and registered on March 20, 2014.

== See also ==
- Telecommunications in North Macedonia
