= .my =

Internet country code top-level domain for Malaysia

- Introduced: 8 June 1987
- TLD type: Country code top-level domain
- Status: Active
- Registry: Malaysia Network Information Centre (MYNIC Berhad)
- Sponsor: Malaysia Network Information Centre
- Intended use: Entities connected with Malaysia
- Actual use: Popular in Malaysia
- Registered domains: 585,296 (2026-10-31)
- Registration restrictions: Malaysian presence required; various restrictions specific to different subdomains
- Structure: Registrations are available at third level beneath some second-level labels
- Documents: Registration; FAQs; Agreement for registration of domain name
- Dispute policies: Dispute Resolution Policy
- DNSSEC: yes
- Registry website: MYNIC

.my is the Internet country code top-level domain (ccTLD) for Malaysia. MYNIC is the agency responsible for the domain, and is under the Ministry of Digital and regulated by the Malaysian Communication and Multimedia Commission (MCMC).

MYNIC administers the name space for .my, as well as its subdomains: .com.my, .org.my, .net.my, .biz.my, .coop.my, .edu.my, .gov.my, .mil.my, and .name.my. This involves the registration of domain names as well as the maintenance and operation of a domain name registry (a central database for .my domain names).

== Second-level global relaunch ==
On 20 June 2024, the .my TLD relaunched, now being available for any natural or legal person worldwide, dropping the Malaysian presence requirement. MYNIC partnered with Tucows Registry Services for technical operation of the TLD and Internet Naming Co. for marketing the TLD. For this relaunch, the domain lifecycle and registration agreement was updated to align more with generic TLDs. All SLDs will be unaffected by this and thus continue to have a local presence requirement.

== Responsibilities ==
In addition, MYNIC holds the responsibility of developing top level domain policies, and carries out research projects such as:

- IPv6 (Internet Protocol version 6)
- DNSSEC (Domain Name Server Security Extensions)
- ENUM (Telephone Number Mapping)
- Anycast and IDN (Internationalised Domain Names)
- Promoting and training activities for the usage of the technologies above

== Services ==
- Registering a .my domain name
- Modifying a record of a domain name already registered with MYNIC
- Deleting a domain name already registered with MYNIC
- Transferring a domain name already registered with MYNIC
- Searching for a domain name already registered with MYNIC
- News and information on the latest MYNIC policies for the .my domain
- Provision of a platform for dispute resolution between the registrant of a .my domain name and a third party

== Chief executive officer ==
The following have been CEOs of MYNIC:

- Shariya Haniz Binti Zulkifli (1 August 2006 – 30 October 2010)
- Tengku Intan Narqiah Binti Tengku Othman (1 February – 21 December 2011)
- Muhammad Ikmaluddin Bin Ismail (3 September 2012 – 4 February 2013)
- YBhg. Datuk Hasnul Fadhly Bin Hasan (8 October 2013 – present)

== Domain name categories ==
MYNIC administers nine (9) domain name categories, namely:

1) .my	for Malaysian individuals and organizations
2) .com.my	for commercial organisation/activities
3) .net.my	for network-related organisations/activities
4) .org.my	for organisations/activities which do not qualify for other categories
5) .edu.my	for Malaysian educational organisations only
6) .gov.my	for Malaysian government organisations only
7) .mil.my	for Malaysian military organisations only
8) .name.my	for Malaysian individuals' personal use only
9) .biz.my	for Micro, Small and Medium Enterprises
10) coop.my	for Malaysian co-operatives only
