= .lt =

Internet country code top-level domain for Lithuania

- Introduced: 3 June 1992
- TLD type: Country code top-level domain
- Status: Active
- Registry: Kaunas University of Technology
- Sponsor: Kaunas University of Technology
- Intended use: Entities connected with Lithuania
- Actual use: Popular in Lithuania
- Registered domains: 263,102 (2026-10-13)
- Registration restrictions: None
- Structure: Registrations are made directly at the second level
- Documents: Regulations
- Dispute policies: An independent commission of lawyers resolves disputes
- DNSSEC: yes
- IDN: yes
- Registry website: .LT domain registry

.lt is the Internet country code top-level domain (ccTLD) for Lithuania.

Following the University of Oslo's request to the Norwegian government that a Lithuanian Internet ccTLD be established, .lt was launched on 3 June 1992. Domain name registration was initially limited to the academic community, state institutions and companies, with the first second-level domains—mii.lt, ktu.lt, and vu.lt—being registered in 1993. In 1994 administration of the .lt ccTLD was transferred from Oslo University to the Kaunas University of Technology.
