= .pe =

Internet country code top-level domain for Peru

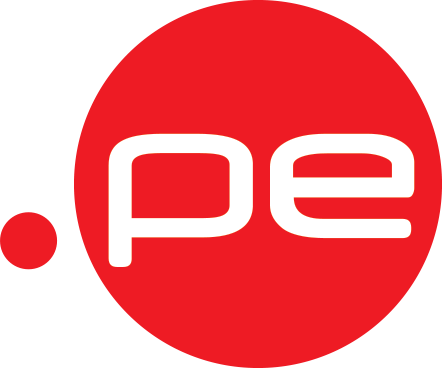
- Introduced: November 25, 1991
- TLD type: Country code top-level domain
- Status: Active
- Registry: NIC PE
- Sponsor: Red Científica Peruana
- Intended use: Entities connected with Peru
- Actual use: Very popular in Peru
- Registered domains: 140,210 (February 3, 2022).pe Registry
- Registration restrictions: Generally none, some words are prohibited from use as a second level domain
- Structure: Second-level domain registration, and third level beneath several second-level domains.
- Documents: Policy (in English); Rules and Procedures (in Spanish)
- Registry website: punto.pe

.pe is the Internet country code top-level domain (ccTLD) for Peru. It was created on 25 November 1991.

It is managed since its creation by the Red Científica Peruana (RCP).

== Structure ==
=== Second-level domains ===
Starting from December 8, 2007, the registry accepts registrations directly at the second level. Prior to this change in policy, registrations were limited to third level domains under second level domains.

=== Third-level domains ===
The third-level domain names that can be registered are:

- com.pe
- net.pe
- org.pe
- mil.pe: Peruvian Armed Forces units
- gob.pe: Peruvian government agencies or institutions
- edu.pe: institutional or educational bodies
- nom.pe
