= .мон =

Top-level domain for Mongolia

- Introduced: 2012
- TLD type: Internationalised (Cyrillic) country code top-level domain
- Status: Active
- Registry: Datacom Co, Ltd
- Intended use: Entities connected with Mongolia in the Cyrillic script
- Registration restrictions: Datacom
- DNS name: xn--l1acc
- DNSSEC: yes
- Registry website: мон.мон

.мон is the internationalised (Cyrillic) internet country code top-level domain (ccTLD) for Mongolia. It is administered by .MN Registry, Datacom. The domain name is composed of the consonants in the three first letters of the country name. The .МОН registry is operated under the thick registry model. Administrative, billing, technical and registrant contacts are required. In 2012 a new top domain was registered for Mongolia, intended for domain names in the Mongolian language. Registrations for the domain opened in May 2014. The first site http://мон.мон became active during that month.

== See also ==
- .mn
