= .ua =

Top-level Internet domain for Ukraine

- Introduced: 1 December 1992
- TLD type: Country code top-level domain
- Status: Active
- Registry: Hostmaster Ltd.
- Intended use: Entities connected with Ukraine
- Actual use: Popular in Ukraine
- Registered domains: 549,180 (January 2021)
- Registration restrictions: Must be the owner of a trade mark registered in Ukraine for second-level domains (and may only register if the domain name is the same as the trade mark); no restrictions for third-level domains
- Documents: Policy documents
- Dispute policies: Domain dispute resolution policy
- DNSSEC: Yes
- Registry website: hostmaster.ua

.ua is the Internet country code top-level domain (ccTLD) for Ukraine. To register at the second-level (example) domainname.ua, possession of the exact trademark (matching the domain name) is required. It is not required for third-level domains (.com.ua, .net.ua, etc.).

== History ==
- 1 December 1992: Registered in root zone
- 13 April 2012: DNSSEC enabled in root zone
- 26 February 2022: Domain servers transferred out of Kyiv for continuity reasons amid the 2022 Russian invasion of Ukraine

== Third-level & second-level domains ==
To remove the risk of cybersquatting, registration of second-level domains directly below .ua is restricted to owners of registered trade marks, who may register a domain name similar to that of the trade mark in question.

However, third-level domains can be registered beneath some of the following:

=== Generic domains ===
- .com.ua: paid, commercial organizations
- .in.ua: paid, domains for individuals
- .org.ua: paid, other organizations (non-commercial)
- .net.ua: paid, network service providers

=== Special domains ===
- .edu.ua: free, available only to proved educational organisations.
- .gov.ua: free, available only to governmental organizations
- .mil.ua: free, available only to armed forces
- .dod.ua

=== Geographical domains ===
There are also second-level domains which are region-specific. These are less popular than the above list (making domain names more available) but they are sometimes restricted to organisations exclusively from within the region.

- .cherkasy.ua, .cherkassy.ua, .ck.ua: Cherkasy Oblast
- .chernihiv.ua, .chernigov.ua, .cn.ua: Chernihiv Oblast
- .chernivtsi.ua, .chernovtsy.ua, .cv.ua: Chernivtsi Oblast
- .crimea.ua, .sebastopol.ua, .yalta.ua: Crimea, Sevastopol, Yalta
- .dnipropetrovsk.ua, .dnepropetrovsk.ua, .dp.ua: Dnipropetrovsk Oblast
- .donetsk.ua, .dn.ua: Donetsk Oblast
- .ivano-frankivsk.ua, .if.ua: Ivano-Frankivsk Oblast
- .kharkiv.ua, .kharkov.ua, .kh.ua: Kharkiv Oblast
- .kherson.ua, .ks.ua: Kherson Oblast
- .khmelnytskyi.ua, .khmelnitskiy.ua, .km.ua: Khmelnytskyi Oblast
- .kropyvnytskyi.ua, .kirovograd.ua, .kr.ua: Kirovohrad Oblast
- .kyiv.ua, .kiev.ua: Kyiv
- .luhansk, .lugansk.ua, .lg.ua: Luhansk Oblast
- .lutsk.ua, .volyn.ua, .lt.ua: Lutsk, Volyn Oblast
- .lviv.ua: Lviv Oblast
- .mykolaiv.ua, .nikolaev.ua, .mk.ua: Mykolaiv Oblast
- .odesa.ua, .odessa.ua, .od.ua: Odesa Oblast
- .poltava.ua, .pl.ua: Poltava Oblast
- .rivne.ua, .rovno.ua, .rv.ua: Rivne Oblast
- .sumy.ua, .sm.ua: Sumy Oblast
- .ternopil.ua, .te.ua: Ternopil Oblast
- .uzhhorod.ua, .uzhgorod.ua, .uz.ua, zakarpattia.ua: Uzhhorod
- .vinnytsia.ua, .vinnica.ua, .vn.ua: Vinnytsia Oblast
- .zaporizhzhia.ua, .zaporizhzhe.ua, .zp.ua: Zaporizhzhia Oblast
- .zhytomyr.ua, .zhitomir.ua, .zt.ua: Zhytomyr Oblast

=== Mirror domains ===
When registering a domain name in one of the mirror domains, a domain name of the same name in the second (other) mirror domain will automatically be reserved for the registrant.

- cherkasy.ua — cherkassy.ua: Cherkasy Oblast
- chernihiv.ua — chernigov.ua: Chernihiv Oblast
- chernivtsi.ua — chernovtsy.ua: Chernivtsi Oblast
- khmelnytskyi.ua — khmelnitskiy.ua: Khmelnytskyi Oblast
- kropyvnytskyi.ua — kirovograd.ua: Kirovohrad Oblast
- kyiv.ua — kiev.ua: Kyiv
- luhansk.ua — lugansk.ua: Luhansk Oblast
- mykolaiv.ua — nikolaev.ua — mk.ua: Mykolaiv Oblast
- odesa.ua — odessa.ua — od.ua: Odesa Oblast
- rivne.ua — rovno.ua: Rivne Oblast
- uzhhorod.ua — uzhgorod.ua: Uzhhorod
- vinnytsia.ua — vinnica.ua: Vinnytsia Oblast
- zaporizhzhia.ua — zaporizhzhe.ua: Zaporizhzhia Oblast
- zhytomyr.ua — zhitomir.ua: Zhytomyr Oblast

=== Geographic domains where new registrations have been terminated ===
- chernovtsy.ua: Chernivtsi Oblast
- chernigov.ua: Chernihiv Oblast
- dnepropetrovsk.ua: Dnipropetrovsk Oblast
- dnipropetrovsk.ua: Dnipropetrovsk Oblast
- kirovograd.ua: Kirovohrad Oblast
- khmelnitskiy.ua: Khmelnytskyi Oblast
- rovno.ua: Rivne Oblast

=== Reserved domain names ===
The administrators of the .UA ccTLD have decided to reserve public domains with transliterations of Ukrainian names for most Ukrainian geographical domains. Geographical public domains, initially based on phone area codes, were allocated during a conference of Ukrainian internet specialists in Slavsko in January 1993, following the delegation of the .UA country code top-level domain. Initially, these domains were mostly transliterations of Russian city names (e.g., kiev.ua, kirovograd.ua, sebastopol.ua). As the Internet transitioned from experimental to mainstream technology, new requirements and discussions for alternative names emerged. In December 1997, shorter, easier-to-remember two-letter names were introduced (e.g., ivano-frankivsk.ua became if.ua). The introduction of these new names aimed to address inherent flaws without replacing old names, allowing parallel registration in both traditional and new domains. These changes, led by domain administrators Dmytro Kohmanyuk, Ihor Svyrydon, and Hostmaster LLC, will ensure Ukrainian transliterations are reserved and mirrored to existing geographical domains, available to administrators by autumn 2008, contingent on compliance with .UA domain rules.

- .cr.ua: Crimea
- .krym.ua: Crimea
- .kv.ua: Kyiv
- .lv.ua: Lviv Oblast
- .sb.ua: Sevastopol
- .sevastopol.ua: Sevastopol
- .sicheslav.ua: Dnipropetrovsk Oblast

=== Technological domains ===
- admin.ua
- ipv6.ua
- ns.ua
- ua.ua
- www.ua
- xn--mqa.ua
- dnssec.ua
- rdap.ua
- epp1.ua
- epp2.ua

== Statistics ==
As of March 2017, around 10.78% of all the .ua domains were served via secured HTTPS protocol, with the Let's Encrypt Authority X3 being the most popular SSL certificate. Nginx is the most popular web server, serving 68.97% of the .ua domains, followed by Apache serving 17.75% of the total .ua domains.

== See also ==
- .укр, a second top domain for Ukraine, active from 2013, which has domains with Cyrillic characters.
- Internet in Ukraine
