= .tw =

Top-level Internet domain for Taiwan

- Introduced: 31 July 1989
- TLD type: Country code top-level domain
- Status: Active
- Registry: TWNIC
- Sponsor: TWNIC
- Intended use: Entities connected with Taiwan
- Actual use: Popular in Taiwan
- Registration restrictions: Requirements vary depending on which second-level name registration is within; foreigners allowed in several categories
- Structure: Registrations are at second level or at third level beneath some second-level labels
- Documents: Guidelines for administration of domain name registration
- Dispute policies: Taiwan Network Information Center Domain Name Dispute Resolution Policy
- DNSSEC: yes
- Registry website: twnic.tw

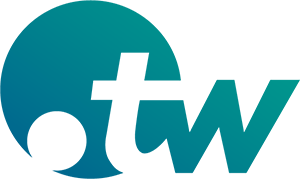
Old logo used to represent the domain

.tw is the country code top-level domain (ccTLD) for Taiwan. The domain name is based on the ISO 3166-1 alpha-2 country code TW. The registry is maintained by the Taiwan Network Information Center (TWNIC), a Taiwanese non-profit organization appointed by the National Communications Commission (NCC) and the Ministry of Transportation and Communication. Since 1 March 2001, TWNIC has stopped allowing itself to sign up new domain names directly, instead allowing new registration through its contracted reseller registrars. As of May 2023, there are 17 registrars.

== Domains ==
.tw domain names can be registered at both the second and third level. Applicants are required to provide an email address for verification.

=== Open registration ===
- tw : intended for general use
- club.tw : intended for clubs or groups
- com.tw : intended for commercial entities
- ebiz.tw : intended for online business-related content
- game.tw : intended for gaming-related content
- idv.tw : intended for individuals

=== Eligibility expected ===
- edu.tw : for educational and academic institutions
- gov.tw : for authorities of Taiwan
- mil.tw : for the military of Taiwan
- net.tw : for network or telecommunications license holders
- org.tw : for non-profit organizations, domestic or overseas

== Statistics ==
As of March 2017, around 8.31% of the .tw domains are served via secured HTTPS protocol, with the cPanel, Inc. Certification Authority being the most popular SSL certificate. Apache is the most popular web server, serving 47.60% of the .tw domains, followed by Microsoft-IIS serving 20.31% of the total .tw domains.

== Internationalized domains ==
Domain names in Chinese characters may also be registered at the second level. Furthermore, any registrant of a standard domain name who has chosen a domestic registrar may automatically get two more domain names in Chinese characters in the following second-level domains: 網路.tw, 組織.tw and 商業.tw. These second-level domains correspond to net.tw, org.tw and com.tw, respectively.

ICANN assigned two internationalized country code top-level domains (IDN ccTLDs) for Taiwan on 25 June 2010:

- .台灣 : Taiwan in traditional Chinese characters (DNS name: .xn--kpry57d)
- .台湾 : Taiwan in simplified Chinese characters (DNS name: .xn--kprw13d)

Since at least November 2015, the simplified suffix is a DNAME alias for the traditional suffix. As a result, any subdomain of the traditional .xn--kpry57d TLD automatically has a CNAME alias from the simplified .xn--kprw13d TLD. The traditional suffix is in active use.

== See also ==
- .cn (China)
- .jp (Japan)
- .kr (South Korea)
