= .gr =

Internet country code top-level domain for Greece

- Introduced: 19 February 1989
- TLD type: Country code top-level domain
- Status: Active
- Registry: [FORTH-ICS]
- Sponsor: FORTH
- Intended use: Entities connected with Greece
- Actual use: Very popular in Greece
- Registration restrictions: second-level domains and .com.gr domain names may be registered without restrictions; some restrictions apply on some of the specific subdomains
- Structure: Registrations are taken directly at the second level or at the third level beneath various second-level subdomains
- Documents: Rules & regulations
- DNSSEC: yes
- Registry website: .gr Registry

.ελ
- Introduced: 2015
- TLD type: Internationalized country code top-level domain
- Status: Active
- Intended use: Entities connected with Greece for content in the Greek alphabet
- Actual use: Sometimes used in Greece
- Registration restrictions: Should be used with subdomains in the Greek alphabet
- DNS name: .xn--qxam

.gr is the country code top-level domain (ccTLD) for Greece. Registrations are processed via accredited registrars and domain names in Greek characters may also be registered.

== Second level domains ==
There are five official second level domains:

Domain	Intended users
.com.gr	For those engaging in commercial activities
.org.gr	Non-commercial organizations
.gov.gr	Government
.edu.gr	Educational institutions
.sch.gr	Educational institutions
.net.gr	Internet Service Providers (ISPs) and network providers
.mil.gr	Exclusively for military purposes
.mod.gr	Ministry of Defence
.co.gr	Commercial use (generally not as widely used as .com.gr).

== Alternative top domain ==
Greece applied for the internationalised country code top-level domain (IDN ccTLD) .ελ (.ΕΛ in capital letters) for domain names composed of letters of the Greek alphabet.

This was turned down by ICANN in April 2011 because it was too visually similar to .EA in Latin letters should ICANN ever implement such a TLD (EA is an exceptionally reserved ISO 3166-1 alpha-2 code element for Ceuta & Melilla).

In 2014, ICANN decided to allow Greece to have the domain .ελ.

The right to this top-level domain was handed over to Greece in October 2015, and it became operational on the Internet on 10 July 2018.

For the first three months, domains already held under .gr as they already were in Latin or Greek letters or transcribed into Greek characters could be obtained for .ελ only by the holder of that .gr domain. Those restrictions ceased to exist in October 2018.
