= .мкд =

Internationalized Internet country code top-level domain for North Macedonia

- Introduced: 2013
- TLD type: Internationalised (Cyrillic) country code top-level domain
- Status: Active
- Registry: MARnet, Macedonian Academic Research Network
- Sponsor: MARnet
- Intended use: Entities connected with North Macedonia in the Cyrillic script
- Actual use: Sees some use in North Macedonia
- Registered domains: 424 (October 2021)
- Registry website: marnet.mk

.мкд (romanized as .mkd; abbreviation of Macedonian: Македонија, romanized: Makedonija; Punycode .xn--d1alf) is the internationalized Internet country code top-level domain (ccTLD) for North Macedonia. It is administered by The Macedonian Academic Research Network (MARnet). In November 2012, MARnet announced that the agency was planning to introduce a national Cyrillic domain. Additionally, the agency started with the process of gathering proposals from the Macedonian citizens about the form of the domain which will be applied for official registration.

The call started on 19 November 2012 and ended on 3 December 2012. The Cyrillic domain proposal had to contain letters of the country's name. On 3 December, MarNet chose six proposals (.мкд, .мак, .македонија, .рмкд, .рм and .рмак). In the second phase of the process, citizens voted for the final Macedonian Cyrillic domain. The winning proposal was officially announced in January 2013.

This also relates to the .mk domain, which is also owned by MARnet.

== Final results ==
In the final phase of choosing the national Cyrillic domain, there were six domains. During the voting period, 2,288 votes were registered and the final results were announced on the official MARnet website.

The final results
Cyrillic domain	votes	%
.мкд	1,670	73
.мак	324	14
.рм	155	7
.македонија	122	5
.рмкд	10	0
.рмак	7	0

The domain .мкд was officially approved and registered on 20 March 2014.
