= Country code top-level domains with commercial licenses =

Country code top-level domains with commercial licenses are Internet country code top-level domain that have adopted a policy for worldwide commercial use.

Some of the world's smallest countries have opened their country code domain to worldwide registrations for commercial purposes. For example, Tuvalu and the Federated States of Micronesia, small island-states in the Pacific, have partnered with VeriSign and FSM Telecommunications respectively, to sell domain name registrations using the .tv and .fm TLDs to television and radio stations.

Some commercially available ccTLDs are in demand for use outside their home countries because their name can provide a component of a meaningful word or phrase. These are sometimes referred to as vanity ccTLDs.

== List of ccTLDs permitting worldwide commercial use ==
- ac (Ascension Island) is sometimes used to stand for "Access Connection" or "Access Card". It is occasionally used by universities to stand for "academic", for example by the University of Kurdistan – Hawler (ukh.ac) or Ralston College (ralston.ac),
- ad (Andorra) has recently been increasingly used by advertising agencies or classified advertising.
- ag (Antigua and Barbuda) is sometimes used for agricultural sites. In Germany and German-speaking countries, AG (short for Aktiengesellschaft) is appended to the name of a stock-based company, similar to Inc. in USA.
- ai (Anguilla) is sometimes used for ai softwares, see .ai.
- am (Armenia) is often used for AM radio stations, or for domain hacks.
- as (American Samoa) In Estonia, Denmark and Norway, AS is appended to the name of a stock-based company, similar to Inc. in USA. In Czech Republic and Slovakia, the joint stock corporation a.s. abbreviation stands for cs:Akciová společnost.
- at (Austria) is used for English words ending in "at".
- be (Belgium) is sometimes used for the literal term "be". It is also used in some download sites as the end of the word "tube" such as downloadyoutu.be, a site for the downloading of YouTube videos. YouTube site is accessible through youtu.be domain, registered by Google itself.
- by (Belarus) is sometimes used in Germany, as "BY" is the official abbreviation of the state Bayern.
- ca (Canada) is occasionally used to create domain hacks like histori.ca, the web domain of The Historica Dominion Institute. This type of use is limited by the .ca domain's Canadian residence requirements.
- cc (Cocos (Keeling) Islands) is used for a wide variety of sites such as community colleges, especially before such institutions were allowed to use .edu. It is also used by some churches as an abbreviation of Christian church. For example, www.gracechurch.cc, www.bible.cc, www.saintjohns.cc. It is also used by a number of cycling-related websites (for example rapha.cc, road.cc), where it stands for the acronym of "cycling club" (even if the websites are not of actual cycling clubs).
- cd (Democratic Republic of Congo) is used for CD merchants and file sharing sites.
- ch (Switzerland) is used for a number of church websites.
- ck (Cook Islands) was used in Chris Morris's Nathan Barley by preceding it with ".co" in order to spell out the word "cock" (.co.ck as in trashbat.co.ck).
- co (Colombia) is marketed as commercial, corporation, or company.
- dj (Djibouti) is used for CD merchants and disc jockies (DJs, as in deejay).
- es (Spain) is used for forming plural words (e.g. in English beach.es).
- fi (Finland) is used as a domain hack by Eye-Fi (eye.fi), a maker of memory cards with Wi-Fi capabilities.
- fm (the Federated States of Micronesia) is often used for FM radio stations (and even non-FM stations, such as internet radio stations).
- gl (Greenland) is often used for Galician or Galicia-related sites, in waiting for the gal domain. This TLD is also used by Google's link shortening and analytics service Goo.gl.
- gg (Guernsey) is often used by the gaming and gambling industry, particularly in relation to horse racing and online poker. "GG" is popularly used in online video games as an acronym of "good game".
- im (the Isle of Man) is often used by instant messaging programs and services.
- in (India) is widely used in the internet industry.
- io (the British Indian Ocean Territory). Notable examples are online storage site Drop.io and task list site Done.io. Commonly used by tech companies or individuals for its relation to Input/Output.
- is (Iceland) is used as the English verb, "to be" in conjunction with a directory name suffix to complete a linguistically correct sentence (for example, "<noun>.is/<verb>" or "<noun>.is/<adjective>).
- ir (Iran) is used in domain hacks (e.g. .has.ir).
- it (Italy) is the third-person neuter pronoun in English and is used for domains such as win.at.it.
- je (Jersey) is often used in Dutch as a diminutive (e.g. "huis.je" = "little house") or as "your" ("zoek.je" = "search your"), and as "I" in French (e.g. "moi.je").
- la (Laos) is marketed as suggesting Los Angeles or Latin America.
- li (Liechtenstein) is marketed as meaning Long Island.
- lv (Latvia) is also used to abbreviate Las Vegas or less frequently, love.
- ly (Libya) is also used for words ending with suffix "ly".
- md (Moldova) is marketed to the medical industry (as in "medical domain" or "medical doctor").
- me (Montenegro) was opened in 2008, and has quickly become one of the most used ccTLDs for vanity. It is used worldwide by individuals, and companies offering services, because of the meaning in English and more languages. It is widely used as well in the Middle East for its abbreviation.
- mn (Mongolia) is used to abbreviate Minnesota.
- ms (Montserrat) is also used for some Microsoft-related projects.
- mu (Mauritius) is used within the music industry.
- ni (Nicaragua) is occasionally adopted by companies from Northern Ireland, particularly to distinguish from the more usual .uk within all parts of the United Kingdom.
- nu (Niue) is marketed as resembling "new" in English and "now" in Scandinavian/Dutch. Also means "nude" in French and Portuguese.
- pr (Puerto Rico) can be used in the meaning of "Public Relations".
- rs (Serbia) is marketed in English words ending with the letters "rs" such as www.blogge.rs.
- sc (Seychelles) is often used as .Source .
- sh (Saint Helena) is also sometimes used for entities connected to the German Bundesland of Schleswig-Holstein or the Swiss Canton of Schaffhausen, or to Shanghai or Shenzhen in China. It also sees use among tech circles: .sh is the file extension for Shell scripts.
- si (Slovenia) is also used by Hispanic sites as "yes" ("sí"). Mexican mayor candidate Jorge Arana, for example, had his web site registered as www.jorgearana.si (i.e. "Jorge Arana, sí", meaning "Jorge Arana, yes").
- sr (Suriname) is marketed in the US as being for "seniors".
- st (São Tomé and Príncipe) is being marketed worldwide as an abbreviation for various things including "street".
- tc (Turks and Caicos Islands) is marketed as "abbreviation of Türkiye Cumhuriyeti".
- tm (Turkmenistan) can be used as "trade mark".
- to (Tonga) is often used as the English word "to", like go.to. Also is marketed as the TLD for Toronto and for the Italian city and province of Turin (Torino in Italian).
- tv (Tuvalu) is used for the television/entertainment industry purposes. It is also used for local businesses in the province of Treviso, Italy.
- vc (Saint Vincent and the Grenadines) is sometimes used to abbreviate "Venture Capital" "Vacation Club" or "Virtual Casino".
- vg (British Virgin Islands) is sometimes used to abbreviate Video games.
- vu (Vanuatu) means "seen" in French as well as an abbreviation for the English language word "view".
- ws (Samoa, earlier Western Samoa) is marketed as .Website.

== See also ==
- Country code top-level domain
