= Nigel Roberts (computer scientist) =

British computer scientist

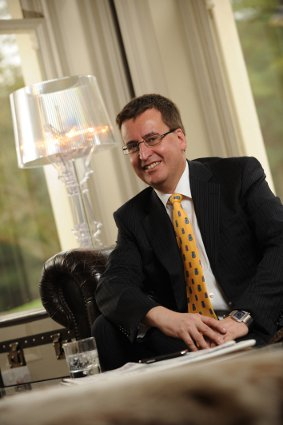
- Born: Liverpool, UK
- Website: https://about.me/nigel.roberts

Nigel Roberts is a British computer scientist.

== Early life and education ==
Roberts was born in Liverpool and grew up in Lancashire.

Educated at Wigan and Prescot Grammar Schools, he received his first degree in Computer Science from Essex University. In 2008 he was awarded a First in law from the Open University and the College of Law of England and Wales (now known as the University of Law).

Whilst still an undergraduate at Essex, Roberts was one of the group of students who conceived and developed the world's first multi-user computer game (MUD) along with Roy Trubshaw and Richard Bartle.

== Career ==
His first job was with Digital Equipment Corporation (DEC) as a software engineer, where (among other projects) he subsequently worked on the pioneering ALL-IN-1 email and office automation system.

In 1996 he founded the Island Networks group of companies, including CHANNELISLES.NET, the registry operator of the .GG and .JE top level domains for Guernsey and Jersey. Co-incidentally, in the early 2020s .GG became popular with esports players and gamers.

In 2005 he became the first person in the UK to obtain damages in court in a lawsuit against a sender of unsolicited email.

== ICANN ==
In 1999, Roberts was one of the original members of the ICANN DNSO Names Council, representing the ccTLD constituency. and has been an active participant at ICANN since its foundation. He was one of the participants in the US Government's International Forum on the White Paper (IFWP) in 1997–1998, which led to ICANN's creation.

He served as one of three elected councillors representing Europe on ICANN's ccNSO Council, one of the two successor bodies to the Names Council between 2013 and the end of June 2018 and again from 2025 onwards.

In September 2017 he was nominated as a candidate for ICANN board of directors by .pr (Puerto Rico), .ci (Côte d'Ivoire) and .be (Belgium). In the subsequent world-wide poll, he was elected receiving 67% of the vote. He served as a director on the ICANN board between October 2018 and October 2021

On 16 April 2025 it was announced that he would be returned unopposed to the ccNSO Council in a Special Election.

== Politics ==
He ran as a Liberal Democrat for the UK Parliament in the Ipswich Constituency in the 1997 general election and later served as an elected member of the Alderney legislature (the States of Alderney) during 2002–2003.

== Radio ==
He was a board director and council member of the Radio Society of Great Britain between 1991 and 1996. He holds the amateur radio callsign GU4IJF. He presents an occasional music programme on Channel Island local FM and DAB community radio station QUAY-FM and serves as a director of its parent, Alderney Broadcasting, which is a Registered Charity. Between November 2021 and February 2024 he served on as one of the directors of the Royal Connaught Residential Home, a local Island charity.

== Professional societies ==
He has been a Chartered Fellow of the British Computer Society since 2005.

He was awarded Fellowship of the Royal Society of Arts in 2016 and became a Fellow of the Institute of Directors in 2019. He is a Chartered Engineer, a European Engineer and a Chartered IT Professional. He is a member of the British Computer Society's Fellows' Technical Advisory Group (F-TAG) He is also a member of BAFTA.

== Honours ==
On 7 June 2022 it was announced that he would be awarded an honorary doctorate by the University of Essex in recognition of his work with ICANN and on the creation of multi-user computer gaming. The degree of Doctor of the University was conferred at the University's commencement ceremony on 18 July 2022.
