= .as =

Top-level Internet domain for American Samoa

- Introduced: June 12, 1997
- TLD type: Country code top-level domain
- Status: Active
- Registry: American Samoan Network Information Center
- Sponsor: American Samoan Network Information Center
- Intended use: Entities connected with American Samoa
- Actual use: Used for a variety of purposes, including applications unconnected to American Samoa; also used for domain hacks and by companies where AS has a special meaning in company names
- Registration restrictions: Domains should not be used for pornographic or racist material; registry has right of refusal for applications
- Structure: Registrations are directly at second level
- Documents: Registry policy
- Dispute policies: UDRP
- DNSSEC: Yes
- Registry website: American Samoan Network Information Center

.as is the Internet country code top-level domain (ccTLD) for American Samoa.

== Registration ==
Domain names are free of charge for businesses and individuals resident in or associated with American Samoa.

It is administered by AS Domain Registry. Island Networks, the operator of .gg and .je provided registry services for .as until November 2025. It is now operated by GDNS, LLC, a company associated with the AS registry.

There is no restriction on registrants, and the domain is also popular outside of Samoa.

== International use ==
A number of .as names have been registered to and used by people, companies and organizations with no connection to American Samoa (for example, people and organizations related to Asturias, a Spanish region).

In Australia, McDonalds uses the .as subdomain for their macc.as short URLS for their regional nickname "Maccas".

"AS" or "A/S" is a suffix indicating a joint stock company in some countries including Norway, Denmark, Estonia and Czech Republic, so this TLD may be of use by companies of this sort.

Also, some autonomous systems or websites providing information about autonomous systems or BGP, such as bgp4.as, have registered domain names.

=== Domain hacks ===
The .as domain is, sometimes, used as a domain hack, since the suffix "-s" means plural in some languages like English, Spanish, and Portuguese, thus "-as" would be the end of the plural of a word that ends with an "a".

Examples of such usage include the Brazilian website escol.as, meaning "schools", or macc.as/feedback for the public food service feedback form for McDonald's in Australia, stemming from the colloquial use of 'Maccas' to describe the restaurant chain in the country.

== 2016 legacy registrar vulnerability ==
In April 2016, a security blog publicized a vulnerability in a .AS legacy registrar system which was claimed might have led to exposure of plain-text passwords of domain contacts associated with domains that did not have a registrar.

This could have potentially allowed an attacker to make modifications to those domains, or even delete them.

However, following publication, the AS Domain Registry confirmed to the reporter that legacy managed domains were subject to human oversight and authentication of all changes. No attempts had been made to take advantage of this apparent vulnerability, and the potential exploit was confirmed to have been closed.

== See also ==
- Internet in American Samoa
- Internet in the United States
- .us
- .um
