= .uk =

Top-level Internet domain for the UK

- Introduced: 24 July 1985; 41 years ago
- TLD type: Country code top-level domain
- Status: Active
- Registry: Nominet UK
- Sponsor: Nominet UK
- Intended use: Entities connected with the United Kingdom
- Actual use: Very popular in the United Kingdom
- Registered domains: 10,508,932 (9,314,572 third level and 1,374,360 second level) (January 2024)
- Registration restrictions: No general restrictions. Some second-level domains have specific restrictions.
- Structure: [name].uk; [name].[generic domain].uk
- Dispute policies: .UK Domain Disputes
- DNSSEC: Yes
- Registry website: theukdomain.uk

.uk is the country code top-level domain (ccTLD) for the United Kingdom. It was first registered in July 1985, seven months after the original generic top-level domains such as .com and the first country code after .us; it was initially meant to be .gb, following the same naming scheme as other countries, but .uk went live so early in the history of the DNS system that .gb fell into disuse. .uk has used OpenDNSSEC since March 2010. As of April 2021, it is the fifth most popular top-level domain worldwide (after .com, .cn, .de and .net), with over 10 million registrations.

== History ==
In October 1984, RFC 920 set out the creation of ccTLDs using country codes derived from the corresponding two-letter code in the ISO 3166-1 list. "GB" is the UK's ISO 3166 country code. However, the UK academic network Name Registration Scheme, JANET NRS, had defined "UK" as the top-level domain a few months before the compilation of the ISO-derived list. Consequently, .uk was chosen and registered on 24 July 1985. .gb was reserved but never widely used and it is no longer possible to register domains under that ccTLD.

As with other ccTLDs in the early days it was originally delegated by Jon Postel to a "trusted person" to manage. Andrew McDowell at UCL was assigned .uk, the first country code delegation. In time, he passed it to Willie Black at the UK Education and Research Networking Association (UKERNA). Originally, domain requests were emailed, manually screened by and then forwarded to the UK Naming Committee before being processed by UKERNA. Membership of this committee was restricted to a group of high-end ISPs who were part of a formal peering arrangement.

The Naming Committee was organised as a mailing list to which all proposed names were circulated. The members would consider the proposals under a ruleset that insisted that all domain names should be very close if not identical to a registered business name of the registrant. Members of the Naming Committee could object to any name, and if at least a small number of objections were received, the name was refused.

By the mid-1990s the growth of the Internet, and particularly the advent of the World Wide Web was pushing requests for domain name registrations up to levels that were not manageable by a group of part-time volunteers. Oliver Smith of Demon Internet forced the issue by providing the committee with a series of automated tools, called the "automaton", which formalised and automated the naming process end to end. This allowed many more registrations to be processed far more reliably and rapidly, and inspired individuals such as Ivan Pope to explore more entrepreneurial approaches to registration.

Various plans were put forward for the possible management of the domain, mostly Internet service providers seeking to stake a claim, each of which were naturally unacceptable to the rest of the committee. In response to this Black, as the .uk Name, stepped up with a bold proposal for a not-for-profit commercial entity to deal with the .uk domain properly. Commercial interests initially balked at this, but with widespread support Nominet UK was formed in 1996 to be the .uk Network Information Centre, a role which it continues to this day.

The general form of the rules (i.e. which domains can be registered and whether to allow second level domains) was set by the Naming Committee. Nominet has not made major changes to the rules, although it has introduced a new second level domain .me.uk for individuals.

Until 10 June 2014 it was not possible to register a domain name directly under .uk (such as internet.uk); it was only possible as a third-level domain (such as internet.co.uk).

However, some domains delegated before the creation of Nominet UK were in existence even before 10 June 2014, for example mod.uk (Ministry of Defence), parliament.uk (Parliament), bl.uk and british-library.uk (the British Library), nls.uk (the National Library of Scotland), nhs.uk (The National Health Service), and jet.uk (UKAEA as operator of the Joint European Torus experimental fusion tokamak).

Currently, management of the .uk domain name is delegated by IANA to Nominet UK. It is possible to directly register a domain name with Nominet UK at £80+VAT as of 2021, but it is faster and cheaper to do it via a Nominet-accredited domain registrar costing in the region of £10+VAT in 2021.

== .uk right of registration ==
New registrations directly under .uk have been accepted by Nominet since 10 June 2014 08:00 BST; however, there was a reservation period for existing customers who already had a .co.uk, .org.uk, .me.uk, .net.uk, .ltd.uk or .plc.uk domain to claim the corresponding .uk domain, which ran until 06:00 BST on 25 June 2019.

If a domain was registered before 23:59 UTC on 28 October 2013 the user had the rights to the equivalent .uk domain (providing there was no other corresponding .co.uk, .org.uk, me.uk, .ltd.uk, .plc.uk or .net.uk registered). For example, if "your-company.co.uk" was held since 2 October 2013, the registrant of 'your-company.co.uk' had the reserved right of registering "your-company.uk", up until 06:00 BST on 25 June 2019. 123-reg and NamesCo both created such domains for their customers for free but then began demanding payment in September 2019.

== Second-level domains ==
=== Active ===
- .ac.uk – academic (tertiary education, further education colleges, research establishments (such as the British Antarctic Survey) and learned societies)
- .co.uk – commercial entities and purposes (the most popular second-level domain for .uk, majority of .uk registrations are on .co.uk domain)
- .gov.uk – government (central, devolved and local)
- .ltd.uk – limited companies
- .me.uk – personal names
- .mod.uk – armed forces and Ministry of Defence establishments and systems
- .mil.uk – internal networks of armed forces and Ministry of Defence establishments and systems
- .net.uk – ISPs and network companies (unlike .net, use is restricted to these users)
- .nhs.uk – NHS organisations and trusts
- .nic.uk – network use only (reserved exclusively for Nominet UK)
- .org.uk – not-for-profit entities
- .parliament.uk – Parliament of the United Kingdom and the devolved national parliaments and assemblies
- .plc.uk – public limited companies
- .sch.uk – local education authorities, schools, primary and secondary education, community education

.co.uk, .ltd.uk, .me.uk, .net.uk, .nic.uk, .org.uk, .plc.uk and .sch.uk are managed by Nominet UK and except for .nic.uk are available for registration by the public (though they all carry various degrees of restrictions). Other second-level domains are managed by various government agencies, and generally more strongly controlled.

=== Inactive ===
- .govt.uk – former government domain, now deleted and replaced by .gov.uk.
- .orgn.uk – former non-profit organisations domain, now deleted and replaced by .org.uk.
- .lea.uk – local education authorities; since fallen out of use.

=== Rejected ===
- .cym.uk – A second-level domain for Wales; it did not have support of the Welsh Internet community, with a .cym domain being proposed, though later rejected. Top-level domains of .cymru and .wales have since been delegated to the root in 2014.
- .scot.uk – A second level domain for Scotland; it was rejected by Nominet. A top-level domain of .scot approved on 10 June 2014 and been delegated to the root since 13 June 2014.
- .sco.uk – A second level domain for Scotland.
- .soc.uk – proposed for Social and Society use.

== Allocation of domain names ==
Allocations are on a strict first-come, first-served basis to qualified applicants. There are no territorial restrictions: applicants need not have any connection to the UK other than those outlined below for .ltd.uk and other restricted domains.

.co.uk is by far the most used of the domains, followed by .org.uk then .me.uk. .plc.uk and .ltd.uk are only rarely used. The number of new registrations for each of the different .uk domains on a month by month basis can be seen on the Nominet UK website.

The intended restriction of .co.uk to companies is purely nominal; in practice it is open to any and all applicants. Likewise, whilst .org.uk is for organisations, there are no restrictions on registering domains. While .me.uk originally had no restrictions on registrants it has since been tightened up to require registrants to be natural persons (i.e. not companies, etc.).

However, registrants in .ltd.uk must be, and remain, private limited companies incorporated under the UK Companies Acts. In addition, names can only be registered if they correspond (in accordance with the algorithm in the rules of registration) with the exact company name, as recorded at the companies registry at Companies House. The same conditions apply for public limited companies which wish to use a .plc.uk domain name. Neither of these domains is widely used.

.net.uk is more open, but the Nominet regulations still mean that a registrant must be an ISP, or a similar body, and that the domain is not used for providing services to end-users. .nic.uk, however, is limited solely to domains operated by Nominet.

.ac.uk domains are intended for the use of higher education institutions and further education colleges, and are also used by some academic support bodies such as the Universities and Colleges Admissions Service public research establishments, and learned societies such as the Royal Society. Primary and secondary education uses .sch.uk.

== sch.uk ==
Unusually, .sch.uk domains are allocated at the fourth level, with the third level being taken up by the name of the local authority (LA, previously LEA or local education authority) e.g. schoolname.leaname.sch.uk. For example, the Little Ilford School in Newham has the domain name littleilford.newham.sch.uk and the West Exe School in Exeter, Devon has the domain name westexe.devon.sch.uk. Previously applications were made in the normal way, but after Nominet came to an arrangement with the education authorities, one domain per school was issued automatically. Those that had already used another domain were still given one and were able to redirect it to their main domain.

== United Kingdom-related top level domains (TLDs) ==
=== Country-Code TLDs (ccTLDs) ===
Domain	Territory
.ac	Ascension Island
.ai	Anguilla
.aq	British Antarctic Territory
.bm	Bermuda
.fk	Falkland Islands
.gb	United Kingdom (formerly)
.gg	Bailiwick of Guernsey
.gi	Gibraltar
.gs	South Georgia and the South Sandwich Islands
.im	Isle of Man
.io	British Indian Ocean Territory
.je	Bailiwick of Jersey
.ky	Cayman Islands
.ms	Montserrat
.pn	Pitcairn Islands
.sh	Saint Helena
.tc	Turks and Caicos Islands
.vg	British Virgin Islands

=== GeoTLDs ===
Domain	Territory
.cymru	Wales (Welsh: Cymru)
.wales	Wales (Welsh: Cymru)
.london	London
.scot	Scotland

== See also ==
- Internet in the United Kingdom
- Internet Provider Security (IPS) tags
- .ac (second-level domain)
- .edu (second-level domain)
- .eng
- .eu
- .gb
