= .bl =

Reserved Internet country-code top level domain for Saint Barthélemy

- Introduced: 21 September 2007
- TLD type: Country code top-level domain (ccTLD)
- Status: Reserved / Unassigned
- Registry: None
- Sponsor: None
- Intended use: Entities connected with Saint Barthélemy
- Actual use: Not available for use
- Registration restrictions: Not available for registration
- DNSSEC: No

.bl is an unused Internet country code top-level domain reserved for Saint Barthélemy, an overseas collectivity of France located in the Leeward Islands of the northeastern Caribbean.

In September 2007, a decision by the ISO 3166 Maintenance Agency assigned BL as the ISO 3166-1 alpha-2 code for Saint Barthélemy which resulted in the domain being allocated. This domain has been officially recognized by the Internet Assigned Numbers Authority since October 2007, yet it remains inactive within the Domain Name System root zone and has never been delegated to a registry operator. Local entities instead rely on France's national domain, .fr, and Guadeloupe's domain, .gp.

== History ==
Saint Barthélemy was part of the French overseas department of Guadeloupe prior to 2007. A local referendum in 2003 resulted in the French Parliament passing Organic Law n° 2007-223 on 21 February 2007, which granted the island, situated among the northern Leeward Islands in the Caribbean, the status of an overseas collectivity (or COM (Note: 'collectivité d'outre-mer' in French)). This political restructuring officially took effect on 15 July 2007.

As a result of its separation from Guadeloupe, Saint Barthélemy required its own independent international identification code. On 21 September 2007, the ISO 3166 Maintenance Agency formally designated BL as the ISO 3166-1 alpha-2 country code for Saint Barthélemy. The allocation of an alpha-2 code automatically qualified the territory for a corresponding country code top-level domain (ccTLD) string, which ultimately resulted in the Internet Assigned Numbers Authority (IANA) adding .bl to its root zone repository on 11 October 2007.

== Status ==
As of 2026, .bl is still a reserved domain. IANA's WHOIS database registers its organizational status as "not assigned", with no technical or administrative contacts specified, and no regional registry or sponsor appointed to manage the suffix. Because no name servers are assigned to the extension within the global Domain Name System, no second-level domain can be resolved online.

The lack of delegation is governed by French national policy regarding its overseas territories. The French network registry Association française pour le nommage Internet en coopération (AFNIC) manages registrations under .fr and extends the eligibility rules covering entities residing in the European Union and also French COMs including Saint Barthélemy. .bl remains unassigned, meaning local entities use .fr, the primary ccTLD for France and its territories along with .gp, the ccTLD for Guadeloupe.

== See also ==
- ISO 3166-2:BL
- Internet in France
- .mf – A reserved and unassigned ccTLD for Saint Martin.
