= .cv =

Top-level Internet domain for Cape Verde

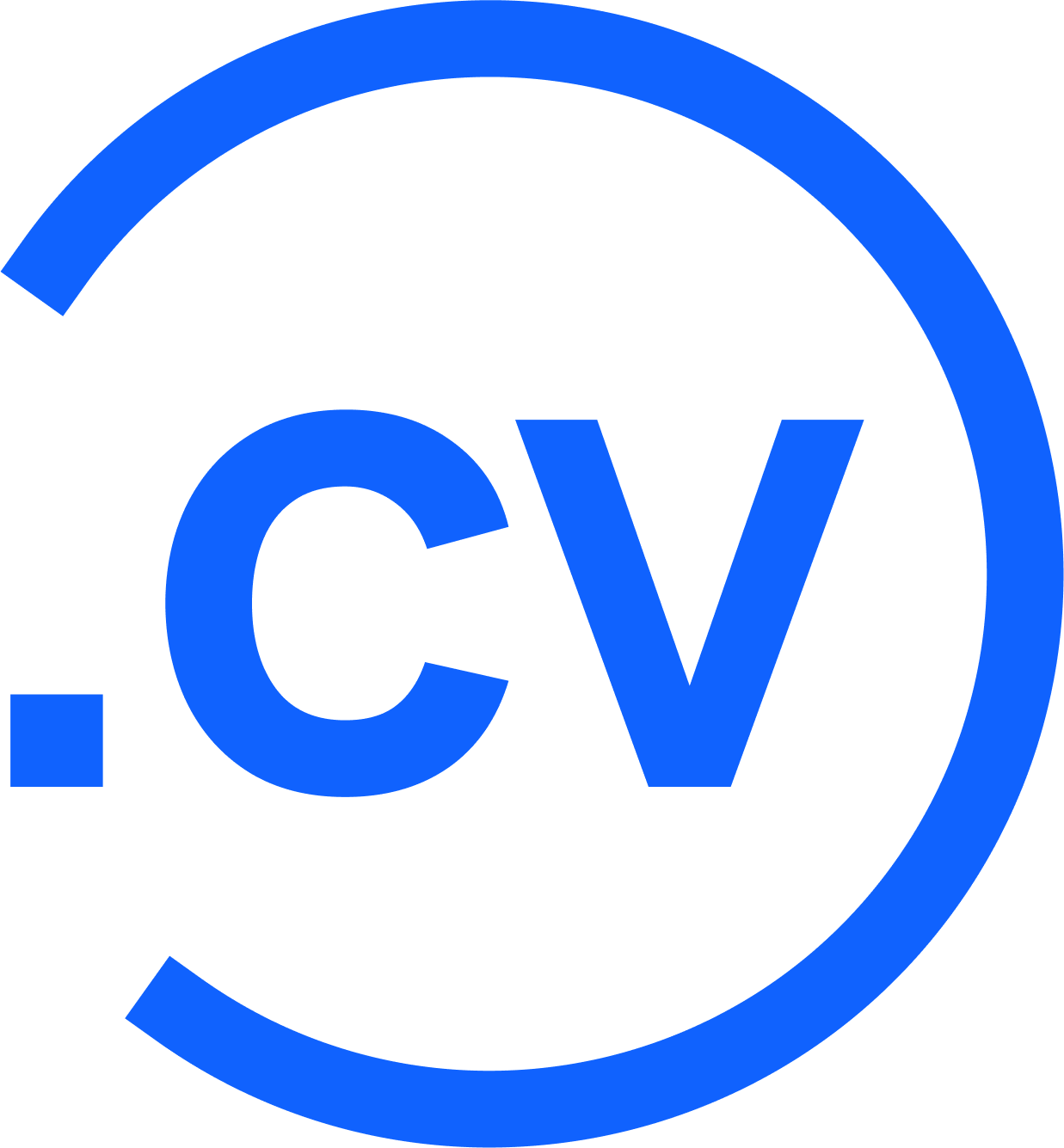
- Introduced: 21 October 1996
- TLD type: Country code top-level domain
- Status: Active
- Registry: Agência Reguladora Multissectorial da Economia (ARME)
- Intended use: Entities connected with Cape Verde
- Actual use: Positions itself for global use like a personal namespace or résumé-style website; can be registered and used for any purpose. Gets some use in Cape Verde.
- Registration restrictions: None
- Structure: Registrations are taken directly at second level
- Dispute policies: UDRP
- Registry website: ola.cv

.cv is the country code top-level domain (ccTLD) for Cape Verde. It is managed by the National Communications Agency (Portuguese: Agência Reguladora Multissectorial da Economia, ARME). In 2024, ARME made the .cv domain available globally and it is now being used and marketed outside of Cape Verde for websites related to curriculum vitae, computer vision, and other general purposes.

== History ==
It was introduced on 21 October 1996 and initially it was managed by the Instituto Superior de Engenharia e Ciências do Mar (ISECMAR), later the School of Maritime Sciences, and finally a campus of the University of Cape Verde, until its redelegation in August 2009 by the current National Communications Agency.

The technical manager, originally the Foundation for the National Scientific Information of Portugal (Fundação para a Computação Científica Nacional, FCCN), a non-profit organisation who managed the .pt domain name, transferred the rights and obligations managing the top level domains to DNS.PT in 2014. The transfer of management rights by the IANA was published for .cv in June of that year.

ARME is part of the group LusNIC, an entity which includes top-level domains of other lusophone countries including .br (Brazil), .gw (Guinea-Bissau), .pt (Portugal), .st (São Tomé and Príncipe) and .ao (Angola). This is why the .cv domain shares a part of the .pt network infrastructure (notably for a part of its DNS servers), and its technical management is delegated to the DNS.PT association.

In 2024 the registry awarded a five year contract to OlaCV to manage the TLD. With this relaunch there was a change in registration procedure, the earlier exclusive registrar was discontinued and instead international registrars can accredit themselves and use a fully automated system. The relaunch also sees a new marketing strategy using .cv as curricula vitae.

== Structure ==
Registrations are possible in the second level. ARME has additionally defined the following third-level TLDs, each with specific target users:

- .net.cv: communication and network services
- .gov.cv: governmental institutions
- .org.cv: nonprofit organizations
- .edu.cv: schools and universities (both public and private)
- .int.cv: international organizations and diplomatic missions
- .publ.cv: periodical magazines registered with the Directorate General of Social Communication
- .com.cv: not restricted, intended for commercial entities
- .nome.cv: Cape Verde nationals and legal residents.
