= .ax =

Top-level Internet domain for Åland

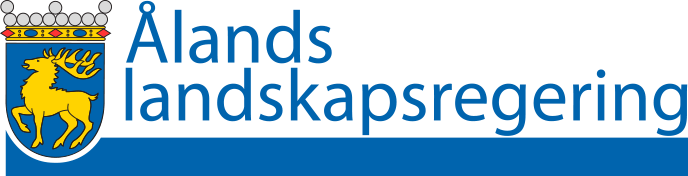
- Introduced: 21 June 2006
- TLD type: Country code top-level domain
- Status: Active
- Registry: Government of Åland
- Sponsor: Government of Åland
- Intended use: Entities connected with the Åland Islands
- Actual use: Popular on the Åland Islands
- Documents: IANA delegation report
- Registry website: whois.ax

.ax is the Internet country code top-level domain (ccTLD) of Åland, Finland, introduced in 2006.

== History ==
Previously, most Åland websites were under the .aland.fi subdomain.

On 17 February 2006, the Finnish parliament approved a modification of the laws regulating Finnish domain names to include the .ax top-level domain.

During a three-year period, the aland.fi subdomain was phased out while .ax was used in parallel; no new registrations under the aland.fi subdomain were to be accepted, and all owners of domains under the aland.fi subdomain would receive registrations for the corresponding .ax domain.

On 17 March 2006, Finnish president Tarja Halonen signed the bill into law, effective as of 27 March. The government of Åland began accepting registrations immediately following the changing of the law.

On 9 June 2006, ICANN approved delegating the .ax top-level domain to the government of Åland. The .ax domain was added to the root zone on 21 June 2006, and became active on 15 August 2006.

The code ax itself comes from the ISO 3166 standard, and was assigned to Åland in 2004.

The letter X is not included in any major or locally used language, but other possible codes were already taken, e.g. .al by Albania, .ad by Andorra, and .an by what was at the time the Netherlands Antilles.

Since 5 September 2016, anyone worldwide is permitted to register domain names under the .ax TLD.
