= .sb =

Internet domain code for Solomon Islands

- Introduced: 19 April 1994
- TLD type: Country code top-level domain
- Status: Active
- Registry: Solomon Islands Network Information Centre
- Sponsor: Solomon Telekom Company Limited
- Intended use: Entities connected with Solomon Islands
- Actual use: Used in Solomon Islands
- Registration restrictions: com.sb and net.sb are unrestricted; names directly under sb need to be manually approved by the registry
- Structure: Registrations are at second-level
- Dispute policies: CoCCA Complaint Resolution Service
- Registry website: www.nic.net.sb

.sb is the Internet country code top-level domain (ccTLD) for Solomon Islands. It is administered through the Council of Country Code Administrators (CoCCA).

The country code derives from the name of the country prior to independence according to the ISO 3166 standard (Solomon Islands, British).

The Principality of Seborga sometimes uses this domain name for its websites.

== Second-level domains ==
As of 12 February 2016 registering domains directly at the second level is allowed. Second-level domains are manually reviewed and must be approved by the NIC before they're added to the zone.

Unrestricted global registration:

- com.sb
- net.sb

Restricted registration:

- edu.sb (educational institutions)
- org.sb (nonprofit organisations)
- gov.sb (government agencies or departments)
