= Data2map =

Presentation mapping service provider

data2map
- Company type: Private
- Founded: 2003
- Headquarters: Saalfelden, Salzburg; Austria
- Area served: worldwide
- Website: data2map

data2map is a presentation mapping service provider based in Saalfelden am Steinernen Meer, Salzburg, Austria.

== Company history ==
The privately owned company is owner managed and was founded in 1999 in Frankfurt, Germany by Manfred Guntz as meridian consult. In 2003 the company was renamed to data2map. In 2007 its head office moved to Salzburg, Austria.

data2map was registered by Deutsches Patent- und Markenamt, Munich, and became a Registered Trademark on October 20, 2005 (Reg. No. 304 59 255, Akz.: 304 59 255.2/42).

== Product history ==
In the early 1990s, when desktop mapping and presentation graphics became accessible to the average office user, data2map hired software engineers and GIS-specialists to develop several vector-map series for easy customization by the end user. The prime objective was to enable office users and professional graphics artists to visualize geo-referenced information on pre-designed country- and world-maps within their favorite standard off-the-shelf software.

== Modern Company ==
Today data2map offers specially optimized digital maps for customization by a wide range of clients in industries such as education, travel, television and gas and water. These maps allow the unrestricted use of all relevant functions of standard software for the creation and design of individual mapping presentations.

=== Product Range ===
- Maps for PowerPoint: vector maps in the file format ppt or pptx, ready made Microsoft PowerPoint slides enabling customization of colours, text, symbols etc.;
- Business Series: vector graphic maps in the file format .ai or fully editable pdf, recommended software Adobe Illustrator, Inkscape;
- Professional Series: vector maps with cartographically very detailed borderlines, including topographic, infrastructural and population content. File formats .ai or fully editable pdf, recommended Software Adobe Illustrator, Inkscape. Topographic- and raster-maps, including satellite images, seamlessly fitting the respecting vector maps;
- Digital flags of all countries and major international organizations, file format ppt, pptx, .ai or fully editable pdf, optimized for PowerPoint and Adobe Illustrator. This includes an add-on to Adobe Illustrator's Symbols Palette making the fully editable vector flags permanently available on Illustrator's desktop panel.

Standard map projections include Miller-, Robinson- and Mercator projection also Gall–Peters- or Hobo-Dyer projection. The digital maps and flags are available for immediate download through the Online-Map-Shop, e.g. world maps, continent- or country maps, post code- as well as topographic maps. All raster- and vector maps are fully editable. They can be customized and redesigned to suit individual requirements using standard software like MS PowerPoint or Adobe Illustrator and Photoshop.
