= .nf =

Internet country code top-level domain for Norfolk Island

- Introduced: 18 March 1996
- TLD type: Country code top-level domain
- Status: Active
- Registry: Norfolk Island Internet Registry
- Sponsor: Norfolk Island Data Services
- Intended use: Entities connected with Norfolk Island
- Actual use: Gets some use related to Norfolk Island
- Registration restrictions: None
- Structure: Registrations are taken directly at second level or at third level beneath some second-level labels
- Dispute policies: CoCCA Complaint Resolution Service
- Registry website: nic.nf

.nf is the Internet country code top-level domain (ccTLD) for Norfolk Island. While there is no rule requiring a local presence to register domains in this TLD, the pricing is significantly higher than most other domains, which has discouraged its use. Although registrations at the second level are the most expensive, they are still more common than third-level registrations, and most names in use are for sites relating to Norfolk Island.

.nf is a member of CoCCA, a group of country-code domains making use of common registry and/or dispute resolution services.

== Second-level domains ==
These second-level domains are available for third-level registrations, with no restriction on who can register them. .com.nf and .net.nf parallel the .com and .net TLDs, while some of the others appear to be based on proposed new TLDs from the late 1990s which were never implemented (other than the eventual use of .info and com.nf).

- .com.nf
- .net.nf
- .arts.nf
- .store.nf
- .web.nf

Norfolk Island Data Services has also reserved:

- .firm.nf
- .info.nf
- .other.nf
- .per.nf
- .rec.nf

== .co.nf ==
A .co.nf second-level domain exists which is commonly misinterpreted as the real commercial second-level domain for the island. The domain is run by a web-hosting provider called biz.nf.

As of 2 September 2019, .co.nf was unavailable and a notice was posted on the control panel of the website hosting stating that the registry has suspended the domain, and replaced it with the .c1.biz subdomain.
