= .sch =

Second-level domain name

In the domain name system (DNS), .sch is a second-level domain used by several countries, including Iran (.ir), Saudi Arabia (.sa), and the United Kingdom (.uk), as a subdomain to represent primary and secondary schools. In the United Kingdom, these are linked with area names, such that schools have a domain name of the form www.<schoolname>.<areaname>.sch.uk. It is up to the individual countries whether to use this classification system, and whether a given organization qualifies as a school.
