= .gs =

Internet country-code top level domain for South Georgia and the South Sandwich Islands

- Introduced: 31 July 1997
- TLD type: Country code top-level domain
- Status: Active
- Registry: Atlantis North Ltd
- Sponsor: Government of South Georgia and the South Sandwich Islands
- Intended use: Entities connected with South Georgia and the South Sandwich Islands
- Actual use: Some use, often unconnected with South Georgia and the South Sandwich Islands
- Registration restrictions: None
- Structure: Registrations can be made directly at second level
- Dispute policies: CoCCA dispute policy CoCCA Complaint Resolution Service
- Registry website: nic.gs

.gs is the Internet country code top-level domain (ccTLD) for South Georgia and the South Sandwich Islands.

.gs is a member of the Council of Country Code Administrators (CoCCA), a group of country-code domains making use of common registry and/or dispute resolution services.

== Usages ==
.gs is a common domain for URL shortening services or general URL shortening. Examples of use include:

- brook.gs (Brookings Institution)
- redwn.gs (Detroit Red Wings)
- lakin.gs (Los Angeles Kings)
- goza.gs (Gonzaga Bulldogs)
- gado.gs (Georgia Bulldogs)
- hvd.gs (The Harvard Gazette)
- brd.gs (Bord Gáis Energy)
- eurowin.gs (Eurowings)
- coralsprin.gs (Coral Springs, Florida)
- win.gs (Red Bull GmbH)
