= .kg =

Internet country-code top level domain for Kyrgyzstan

- Introduced: 12 July 1995
- TLD type: Country code top-level domain
- Status: Active
- Registry: AsiaInfo Telecommunication Enterprise
- Sponsor: AsiaInfo Telecommunication Enterprise
- Intended use: Entities connected with Kyrgyzstan
- Actual use: Used in Kyrgyzstan
- Registration restrictions: Registrant must provide correct contact information
- Structure: Registrations are directly at second level; there are some special third-level registrations such as those under gov.kg
- Documents: Regulations
- Dispute policies: Registry reserves right to suspend or cancel names in cases of infringement of others' rights
- DNSSEC: Yes
- Registry website: www.cctld.kg

.kg is the Internet country code top-level domain (ccTLD) for Kyrgyzstan. Although registrations are normally at the second level, there are some specialized third-level registrations such as those under gov.kg and mil.kg.

== Second-level domain names ==
- .org.kg
- .net.kg
- .com.kg
- .edu.kg
- .gov.kg
- .mil.kg
