= .gh =

Internet country code top-level domain for Ghana

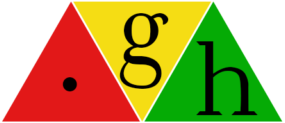
- Introduced: 19 January 1995
- TLD type: Country code top-level domain
- Status: Active
- Registry: Ghana Network Information Center
- Sponsor: Network Computer Systems
- Intended use: Entities connected with Ghana
- Actual use: Popular in Ghana; Gets some other uses
- Registration restrictions: Company must be registered in Ghana, and website domain administrator must be located there
- Structure: Registrations are at third level beneath second-level labels; second-level registrations were formerly taken
- Dispute policies: UDRP
- DNSSEC: No
- Registry website: GhNIC

.gh is the country code top-level domain (ccTLD) for Ghana.

== Second level domains ==
Domain	Intended purpose
.com.gh	Companies
.edu.gh	Schools
.gov.gh	Government
.parliament.gh	Parliament of Ghana
.isoc.gh	ISOC Ghana Chapter
.nic.gh	Ghana Network Information Center
.cocobod.gh	Ghana Cocoa Board
.techgov.gh	Techgov
.yellowpages.gh	Yellow Pages Ghana Directory
