= .ps =

Internet country code top-level domain for Palestine

- Introduced: 22 March 2000
- TLD type: Country code top-level domain
- Status: Active
- Registry: PNINA
- Sponsor: PITA
- Intended use: Entities connected with Palestine
- Actual use: Fairly popular in Palestine
- Registration restrictions: 2nd-level registrations unrestricted; 3rd-level registrations may have limitations based on which 2nd-level domain they are within
- Structure: May register at second level or beneath generic 2nd-level categories at 3rd level
- Documents: IANA reports: Delegation (2000), Redelegation (2004); ICANN MoU
- Dispute policies: DRS Policy
- Registry website: pnina.ps

.ps is the Internet country code top-level domain officially assigned to the State of Palestine. It is administered by the Palestinian National Internet Naming Authority (PNINA).

The Internationalized country code top-level domain for the State of Palestine is .فلسطين, which is represented as .xn--ygbi2ammx in Punycode.

== History ==
=== Telecommunications in Palestine ===
Following the Oslo Accords, the Palestinian telecommunications sector has expanded, under the condition that certain supplies would be temporarily supplied by israeli companies, such as Bezeq, until the Palestinian Authority developed an independent telephone network. Under the same agreement, Palestinian authorities would be allowed to adopt its own standards, and infrastructure, import and use any type of telephone, fax and answering machines, in addition to modems and data terminals. To compete with Israeli influence within the sector, the Palestinian Authority supported the use of Palestinian companies including Paltel.

Israel opposed Palestine's membership to the International Telecommunication Union (ITU), as Palestine was not a UN member state. With the 1998 resolution 52/250 of the UNGA, Palestine was granted wider access to rights within the UN. On this basis, the ITU passed resolution 99, granting Palestine observer status.

=== Creation of the country code ===
The Palestinian Authority made their first attempt at receiving their own country code in 1997. ICAAN rejected the request on the basis that Palestine was not among the UN-recognized countries and territories, in the ISO 3166-1 list. As an interim solution, the second-level "Palestine.int" was used.

The situation changed in 1999, when, after two years of discussions, the United Nations Statistics Division told the ISO 3166 Maintenance Agency that it had included "Occupied Palestinian Territory" on the UN list of Standard Country and Area Codes for Statistical Use. The agency announced that from 1 October 1999, it would add "ps" to the ISO 3166-1 list to designate "Occupied Palestinian Territory". The precedent of other non-independent territories gaining country codes, such as Puerto Rico or the Netherlands Antilles, was referenced. This opened the way for an application the same year, which was then granted in 2000.

== Second level domains ==
Registrations can be made at the second-level as well as at several third-level domain names:

- .ps: open to anyone (not required to be Palestinian)
- com.ps, net.ps, org.ps: unrestricted
- edu.ps: Educational institutions.
- gov.ps: institutions of the PNA and government.
- sch.ps: Palestinian schools

== Domain hacks ==
It has also been used in domain hacks, for example meetu.ps for meetups on the website Meetup, grou.ps, and by the University of Maryland as ter.ps (from "Terps", a nickname for the Maryland Terrapins).
