= .cu =

Top-level Internet domain for Cuba

- Introduced: 3 June 1992
- TLD type: Country code top-level domain
- Status: Active
- Registry: Cuba-NIC
- Sponsor: CENIA Internet (CITMATEL)
- Intended use: Entities connected with Cuba
- Actual use: Some usage in Cuba
- Registered domains: 8,479 (17 November 2026)
- Registration restrictions: Entities outside Cuba may only register .cu and .com.cu, and are subject to USD pricing rather than the CUP rate
- Structure: May register at second level or beneath generic 2nd-level categories at 3rd level
- Dispute policies: None
- Registry website: CUBANIC

.cu is the country code top-level domain (ccTLD) for Cuba.

== Registration ==
Cuban and foreign legal entities, as well as natural persons residing in the country, may request the granting of a domain name.

Entities present in Cuba are charged fees in Cuban peso, while entities outside of Cuba are charged in United States dollars and are only permitted to register .cu and .com.cu domains.

== Second-level domain names ==
Domain	Delegation	Intended sector
.com.cu	Internal	Commercial
.edu.cu	Internal	Educational institutes
.gob.cu	Internal	Government-related websites only
.net.cu	Internal	Internet Service Providers
.org.cu	Internal	Non-governmental organizations and nonprofit organizations
.inf.cu	Internal	Scientific information and providers of information or content
.nat.cu	Internal	Natural persons residing in Cuba
.co.cu	External	Commercial
.sld.cu	External	Health
.tur.cu	External	Tourism
.cult.cu	External	Culture

== See also ==
- List of Internet top-level domains
- Internet in Cuba
- ISO 3166-2:CU
