= .mc =

Internet country code top-level domain for Monaco

- Introduced: 20 January 1995
- TLD type: Country code top-level domain
- Status: Active
- Registry: Direction des Telecommunications
- Sponsor: Direction des Telecommunications
- Intended use: Entities connected with Monaco
- Actual use: Popular in Monaco as well as websites related to Minecraft
- Registration restrictions: Must show registration of company, organization, or trademark in Monaco
- Structure: Registrations are made directly at the second level
- Dispute policies: Disputes are dealt with between parties involved; registry stays out of them
- Registry website: www.nic.mc

.mc is the Internet country code top-level domain (ccTLD) for the Principality of Monaco. Registrations are made directly at the second level and require a company registration in Monaco. Registration for individuals is not allowed. Domains need to have a minimum length of 3 characters and no Unicode domains are possible.

== History ==
On 28 January 2022 a new domain name charter was published; since then all SLDs are retired and no new registrations are allowed for:

- .tm.mc
- .asso.mc
- .dentiste.mc
- .consul.mc
- .experts-comptables.mc
- .comptables-agrees.mc
- .architectes.mc
- .avocat.mc
- .notaire.mc.

Existing domains in these zones continue to function.

On 1 March 2022 the registry introduced a registrar model and domains can only be registered by registrars since then.
