= .th =

Internet country code top-level domain for Thailand

- Introduced: 7 September 1988
- TLD type: Country code top-level domain
- Status: Active
- Registry: THNIC
- Sponsor: THNIC
- Intended use: Entities connected with Thailand
- Actual use: Popular in Thailand
- Registered domains: 68,036 (22 April 2018)
- Registration restrictions: Varying restrictions based on which second-level name registration is within
- Structure: Registrations are at third level beneath various categories
- DNSSEC: Yes
- Registry website: thnic.co.th

.th is the Internet country code top-level domain (ccTLD) for Thailand.

It is administered by T.H.NIC Co., Ltd. (THNIC), the corporate entity of Thai Network Information Center Foundation.

== Registration ==
Registration of a .co.th domain name is a complicated procedure; for this reason most Thai websites prefer to use a .com name. In order to register a .co.th domain name the registrar in Thailand requires copies of company documents in the same name as the required domain name, so for example if an entity required acme.co.th the entity would need to have a registered company called Acme Co., Ltd.

A company can only register a single .co.th domain with the company name or initial name of company, and/or one .co.th domain name per trademark.

In 2018, the foundation advance to the registration for authentic using of persons (natural persons and juristic persons); therefore, the foundation reserves the right to consider and decide the number of domain names of each person on a case-by-case basis. The person who registered more than one domain name from all categories must comply with the following conditions:

- All domain name registrations must comply with the criteria of domain naming and conditions as provided specified policy by categories of domain name.
- The registration of domain names shall be effected in good faith by a holder of the domain name and a contact person who having a residential address or an office address in Thailand which can be contacted by THNIC.
- In the case THNIC detects any unusual act in domain name registration, specifically, registration of more than one domain name, THNIC reserves the right to refuse the request or revoke the domain name immediately.

== Second-level domains ==
THNIC admits regular .th registration for third-level domain under seven groups of predefined second-level domains:

For English domain names	For Thai domain names	Eligible applicant
.ac.th	.ศึกษา.ไทย	Academic
.co.th	.ธุรกิจ.ไทย	Commercial
.go.th	.รัฐบาล.ไทย	Governmental
.mi.th	.ทหาร.ไทย	Military
.or.th	.องค์กร.ไทย	Non-profit organizations
.net.th	.เน็ต.ไทย	Internet service provider
.in.th	.ไทย	Individuals, companies or organizations

In 2014 THNIC opens registration for second-level domain name. They are typically available for new registration in three rounds annually. Each domain name must be the English name of an organization, trademark or natural person, except in the case of a project name. Each domain is subjected to a 10,000 baht application fee and 100,000 baht annual fee for the first 10 years.

== Internationalised domain ==
.ไทย
- Introduced: 2010
- TLD type: Country code top-level domain
- Status: Active
- Registry: THNIC
- Sponsor: THNIC
- Intended use: Entities connected with Thailand
- Actual use: secondary domain name
- Registered domains: 18,633 (April 22, 2018)
- DNS name: .xn--o3cw4h
- DNSSEC: yes
- Registry website: THNIC

In 2010, an internationalised top-level domain name was registered and introduced for Thailand, intended for domain names in the local language. This top domain is .ไทย (.thai). As of 2011, thousands of sites with this domain are active.

It appears that the Thai second-level .ไทย domains are assigned directly to sites with English .in.th domain names. Other groups of .th domains must use third-level .ไทย domains, as in the table above.
