= .sn =

Top-level Internet domain for Senegal

- Introduced: 19 March 1993
- TLD type: Country code top-level domain
- Status: Active
- Registry: NIC Senegal
- Sponsor: Université Cheikh Anta Diop
- Intended use: Entities connected with Senegal
- Actual use: Used in Senegal
- Registration restrictions: None
- Structure: Registrations are made directly at the second level, or at the third level beneath second-level names
- Registry website: NIC Senegal

.sn is the Internet country code top-level domain (ccTLD) for Senegal. Technical operation of the TLD is handled by AFNIC. Domains are sold through 68 accredited registrars.

The following 2nd level domains are available for third-level domain name registration:

- art.sn
- com.sn
- edu.sn
- gouv.sn
- org.sn
- perso.sn
- univ.sn

Some companies like Epson use the TLD as a domain hack for "Setup Navi" in the user manual.
