= .gg =

Internet country-code top level domain for Guernsey

- Introduced: 7 August 1996; 30 years ago
- TLD type: Country code top-level domain
- Status: Active
- Registry: Island Networks
- Sponsor: Island Networks
- Intended use: Entities connected with Guernsey
- Actual use: Websites in Guernsey, as well as gaming, esports and gambling websites
- Registration restrictions: None
- Structure: Registrations are directly at second level or under second level generic categories
- Documents: T&C
- Dispute policies: DRS
- DNSSEC: Yes
- Registry website: Island Networks

The letters "gg" in the Press Start font

.gg is the country code top-level domain for the Bailiwick of Guernsey.

== Administration ==
The domain is administered by Island Networks, who also administer the .je domain for neighbouring territory Jersey.

== History ==
The domain was chosen as other possible codes were already allocated.

Nigel Roberts and Laurie Brown, co-founders of Island Networks, created the .gg and .je domains in 1996 by proposing them to Jon Postel of the Internet Assigned Numbers Authority.

In the late 2000s, there was an increase in usage of the domains by local companies, with there being about 10,000 .gg and .je domain names by 2009.

== Domain hacks ==
Multiple video games, streamers and esports websites use Guernsey's domain (.gg) because "gg" is a common initialism used in multiplayer video games as an abbreviation for the phrase "good game", usually said at the end of a match.

For example, the VoIP application Discord, commonly used with multiplayer games, uses the domain discord.gg as a redirect to their main website, discord.com, as well as for Discord server invite links.

== Second-level domains ==
Names have been registered principally directly at second level, but the following legacy sub-domains are still open for registration:

Domain	Intended users
.co.gg	Commercial / personal
.net.gg	Internet service providers / commercial
.org.gg	Organisations (free to local good causes)

== See also ==
- .gb
- .me
- .tv
- .uk
