= .mo =

Top-level Internet domain for Macau

- Introduced: 17 September 1992
- TLD type: Country code top-level domain
- Status: Active
- Registry: Macao Network Information Centre
- Sponsor: Government of Macau
- Intended use: Entities connected with: Portuguese Macau (1992–1999); Macau SAR, China (1999–present)
- Actual use: Gets limited use in Macau
- Registration restrictions: Limited to local businesses and organizations in Macau
- Structure: Second-level registrations are now available to registrants who already have the same name at third level
- Documents: Regulations
- Registry website: monic.mo

.mo is the Internet country code top-level domain (ccTLD) for the Macau Special Administrative Region. It was introduced on 17 September 1992.

== History ==
The registry for this domain name is operated by the Macao Network Information Centre (MONIC). Operated by the University of Macau since 1992, MONIC administers the registration of the country-code domain names ccTLD.

To further promote the development of services, the Government of Macau changed the operation entity of MONIC. Effective from 12 March 2011, HNET Asia Limited appointed by the Macau government, is responsible for operating MONIC.

== Registration ==
".mo" domain names can be registered at both the second and third level, with registration restrictions apply.

Domain	Domain 2	Domain 3	Eligibility
.mo		.澳門	Legal entities in Macau
.com.mo	.公司.mo	.公司.澳門	Legal entities in Macau
.edu.mo	.教育.mo	.教育.澳門	Educational institutions in Macau
.gov.mo	.政府.mo	.政府.澳門	Government agencies in Macau
.net.mo	.網絡.mo	.網絡.澳門	Network service providers in Macau
.org.mo	.組織.mo	.組織.澳門	Non-profit organisations in Macau

== Internationalized domains ==
In early 2015, two new top level domains were reserved for Macau. They are .澳门 (in simplified Chinese) and .澳門 (in traditional Chinese). MONIC has requested these domains.

== See also ==
- .hk (Hong Kong)
- .cn (Mainland China)
