= .tg =

Internet country code top-level domain for Togo

- Introduced: 5 September 1996
- TLD type: Country code top-level domain
- Status: Active
- Registry: C.A.F.E. Informatique et Telecommunications
- Sponsor: C.A.F.E. Informatique et Telecommunications
- Intended use: Entities connected with Togo
- Actual use: Used mostly related to Togo
- Registration restrictions: None
- Structure: Registrations can be made directly at second level or at third level beneath various second level labels
- Registry website: NIC.tg

.tg is the Internet country code top-level domain (ccTLD) for Togo. Although there are no restrictions on who can register domains in this TLD, it is not often used outside Togo.

As of 2008, no online registration and domain maintenance features were available on the registry site, although a basic web-based whois capability is provided.
