= .az =

Top-level Internet domain for Azerbaijan

- Introduced: 25 August 1993
- TLD type: Country code top-level domain
- Status: Active
- Registry: IntraNS
- Sponsor: IntraNS
- Intended use: Entities connected with Azerbaijan
- Actual use: Popular in Azerbaijan. Some use in Arizona and the Azores.
- Registered domains: 48,250 (2025-09-29)
- Registration restrictions: Pornography is not allowed.
- Structure: Registrations are directly at second level, or at third level beneath some second-level labels
- Documents: Regulations
- Registry website: Whois.az

.az is the Internet country code top-level domain (ccTLD) for Azerbaijan. It is administered by IntraNS.

== Second-level domains ==
Second-level domains under .az are:

- com.az
- net.az
- int.az
- gov.az
- org.az
- edu.az
- info.az
- pp.az
- mil.az
- name.az
- pro.az
- biz.az
- co.az
