= .lb =

Internet country-code top level domain for Lebanon

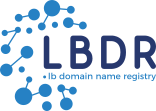
- Introduced: 25 August 1993
- TLD type: Country code top-level domain
- Status: Active
- Registry: Internet Society Lebanon
- Sponsor: Internet Society Lebanon
- Intended use: Entities connected with Lebanon
- Actual use: Reasonably popular in Lebanon
- Registered domains: 4166 (2017)
- Registration restrictions: Registrant must have a Lebanese address; specific restrictions enforced for each second-level subdomain
- Structure: Registrations are at third level beneath second-level categories
- Documents: Registration Policy
- Registry website: Lebanese Domain Registry

.lb is the Internet country code top-level domain (ccTLD) for Lebanon.

== History ==
The Lebanese Domain Registry (LBDR) was established in 1993. It offered domains free of charge directly to registrants, without the use of a registrar model. Since 1 February 2021, they introduced a registrar model and registrants can not directly register their domains at the registry anymore. At the same time the registry also introduced a yearly fee for domains and removed the trademark requirement for registrants. On 13 July 2023, ICANN took over the registry management of .lb in a caretaker role due to the death of the registry manager. On 21 January 2024, ICANN approved the transfer of .lb to the new registry Internet Society Lebanon.

== Second-level domains ==
- com.lb – commercial
- edu.lb – educational
- gov.lb – government
- net.lb – network infrastructure
- org.lb – organizations
