= .mf =

Reserved Internet country-code top level domain for Saint Martin

- Introduced: 21 September 2007
- TLD type: Country code top-level domain (ccTLD)
- Status: Reserved / Unassigned
- Registry: None
- Sponsor: None
- Intended use: Entities connected with Saint Martin
- Actual use: Not available for use
- Registration restrictions: Not available for registration
- DNSSEC: No

.mf is an unused Internet country code top-level domain (ccTLD) reserved for Saint Martin, an overseas collectivity of France located in the Leeward Islands of the northeastern Caribbean. MF was assigned as the ISO 3166-1 alpha-2 code for Saint Martin in 2007, but it remains inactive within the Domain Name System (DNS) root zone and has never been delegated to a registry operator. Local entities instead rely on France's national domain, .fr, and Guadeloupe's domain, .gp.

== History ==
Saint Martin was part of the French overseas department of Guadeloupe prior to 2007. A local referendum in 2003 resulted in the French Parliament passing Organic Law n° 2007-223 on 21 February 2007, which granted the island the status of an overseas collectivity (or COM (Note: 'collectivité d'outre-mer' in French)). This political restructuring officially took effect on 15 July 2007.

As a result of its separation from Guadeloupe, Saint Martin required its own independent international identification code. On 21 September 2007, the ISO 3166 Maintenance Agency formally designated MF as the official country code, which also allowed for the creation of a corresponding ISO 3166-2:MF regional code. The allocation of this alpha-2 code automatically qualified the territory for a corresponding ccTLD string, which ultimately resulted in the Internet Assigned Numbers Authority (IANA) adding .mf to its global root zone repository, the authoritative database governing top-level domains, on 11 October 2007.

== Status ==
As of 2026, .mf is still a reserved domain. IANA's WHOIS database registers its organizational status as "not assigned", with no technical or administrative contacts specified, and no regional registry or sponsor appointed to manage the suffix. Because no authoritative name servers are assigned to the extension within the global DNS root, no second-level domains under .mf can be looked up or resolved online.

The lack of delegation is governed by French national policy regarding its overseas territories. Instead of maintaining a separate registry infrastructure for Saint Martin, the French network registry Association française pour le nommage Internet en coopération (AFNIC) manages internet registrations under France's primary .fr domain. AFNIC allows residents and entities located within French overseas collectivities, including Saint Martin, to register domains under the main .fr namespace directly. As long as this policy remains in place, local entities continue to utilize .fr, along with .gp, the ccTLD for Guadeloupe.

== See also ==
- List of Internet top-level domains
- Geographic top-level domain
- Internationalized country code top-level domain
- ISO 3166-1
