= .um =

Former internet country code domain for the U.S. Minor Outlying Islands

- Introduced: 1997
- Removed: April 20, 2008
- TLD type: Country code top-level domain
- Status: Changed to unassigned by ICANN action in 2007, since deleted from root zone
- Registry: United States Minor Outlying Islands Registry
- Sponsor: University of Southern California (Information Sciences Institute)
- Intended use: Entities connected with United States Minor Outlying Islands
- Actual use: For experimental use
- Registry website: www.nic.um

.um was the Internet country code top-level domain for the United States Minor Outlying Islands. It was administered by the United States Minor Outlying Islands Registry. Until late 2006 USMIR was housed at the University of Southern California Information Sciences Institute (USC-ISI), which was the original administrator of .us prior to NeuStar absorbing that role.

In January 2007, the Internet Corporation for Assigned Names and Numbers reportedly dropped the .um domain from the master list of domain names in response to the domain's being unused and USC-ISI's desire to divest itself of responsibility for the domain. In November 2007 at the registry website of www.nic.um a message stated "Registration is CLOSED at this time. We are only accepting Registrar Accounts." Links to a brief description of each of the individual American islands were also given. In December 2007, registration was opened on an experimental basis with an "Annual Account Maintenance" fee of $1,200 and a $30 annual domain registration.

Since the USC-ISI divested itself of this registry, in late 2006, EP.NET hosted USMIR and continued to administer it. According to the www.nic.um site at that time, the TLD was no longer affiliated with USC-ISI and had spun off the venture into an independent company, USMIR, which has the same contact information as that of the limited liability company EP.net. Accessing the website without the "www" subdomain returned a copy of the main site for EP.net.

Some .um websites, like 'hotel.um' and 'co.um' appeared after the TLD registry opened; however, as of April 20, 2008, the .um domain has been removed from the DNS root zone. It appears ICANN took the action of removing .um from the root since USC-ISI requested this. Whether USMIR will refund domain owners is not known. According to the revocation report on the IANA website, the United States Department of Commerce has approved the removal and has also instructed ICANN not to reassign the domain without prior approval from the United States Department of Commerce.

== See also ==
- Internet in the United States
- .us
