= .ci =

Top-level Internet domain for Ivory Coast

- Introduced: 14 February 1995
- TLD type: Country code top-level domain
- Status: Active
- Registry: Network Information Center - Côte d'Ivoire
- Sponsor: Institut National Polytechnique Felix Houphouet Boigny
- Intended use: Entities connected with Côte d'Ivoire
- Actual use: Gets some use in Côte d'Ivoire
- Registered domains: 17,220 (December 12, 2022)
- Registration restrictions: Name must match official name of company, organization, or trademark
- Structure: Registrations are made directly at the second level, or at the third level beneath some second-level labels
- Documents: Charte de nommage
- DNSSEC: Yes
- Registry website: nic.ci

.ci is the Internet country code top-level domain (ccTLD) for Côte d'Ivoire.

== Domain names ==
In most situations, specific registrations are done using a second level domain name.

Côte d'Ivoire also makes use of a special convention with an introductory name such as chu- instead of the second level domain name.

Domain	Level	Intended purpose
amb-name.ci	Special	Embassies
chu-name.ci	Special	Hospitals
ot-name.ci	Special	Tourism offices
univ-name.ci	Special	Universities
cci-name.ci	Special	Companies House
mairie-name.ci	Special	City halls
.org.ci	Second	International organizations
or.ci	Second	International organizations
.com.ci	Second	Commercial organizations
co.ci	Second	Commercial organizations
.edu.ci	Second	Education, schools, universities, academies
.ed.ci	Second	Education, schools, universities, academies
ac.ci	Second	Education, schools, universities, academies
.net.ci	Second	Network related businesses
.gouv.ci	Second	Governmental organizations
