= .ao =

Top-level Internet domain for Angola

- Introduced: November 15, 1995
- TLD type: Country code top-level domain
- Status: Active
- Registry: DNS.AO
- Sponsor: Ministry of Telecommunications and Information Technologies
- Intended use: Entities connected with Angola
- Actual use: Gets some use in Angola
- Registered domains: ≈5,900 (March 2024)
- Registration restrictions: Limited to registrants within Angola
- Structure: Registrations are at third level beneath second level labels; there appear to also be some direct second-level registrations
- DNSSEC: No
- Registry website: www.dns.ao

.ao is the Internet country code top-level domain (ccTLD) for Angola. It was originally administered by the college of engineering of the University of Agostinho Neto before being redelegated to the Ministry of Telecommunications and Information Technologies.

== History ==
=== New Registry (DNS.AO) ===
On 17 June 2019, commercial registration of domains was relaunched, with a single registrar approved for issuance, the government-run Serviços Públicos Electrónicos do Governo de Angola. Registration cost was reduced to 8000 Kwanzas per year. By January 2020, 2500 new registrations were received, six times more than in the previous five years. Registrations from outside Angola are not yet permitted.

=== Original Registry (Reg.AO) ===
As of January 2019, the old registry's website had not been modified since December 2001, and consisted of a single page in Portuguese. One of the few links on the page was to a document in Microsoft Word format, in English, which gave registration rules for the domain; they stated that registration by entities outside Angola was to be done only in the .it.ao subdomain. The search engine Google seems to be the first .it.ao entity using the subdomain. It also said that registrations were only taken at the third level. Registration cost was US$300.
