= .gb =

Reserved Internet country-code top level domain for the United Kingdom

- Introduced: 24 July 1985
- TLD type: Country code top-level domain
- Status: Unused (reserved)
- Registry: JANET (Jisc)
- Intended use: Entities connected with Great Britain (the United Kingdom)
- Actual use: Fallen into disuse in favour of .uk
- Registration restrictions: No registrations presently being taken
- Structure: name.gb, Government Websites assigned as .hmg.gb

.gb is a reserved Internet country code top-level domain (ccTLD) for the United Kingdom, derived from Great Britain.

== History ==
The domain was introduced with RFC 920 in October 1984 that set out the creation of ccTLD generally using country codes derived from the corresponding two-letter code in the ISO 3166-1 list. However, the .uk domain had been created separately a few months before the compilation of this list. Consequently, .gb was never widely used. It is no longer possible to register under this domain.

.gb was used for a number of years, mainly by British government organisations and commercial e-mail services using X.400-based e-mail infrastructure. This simplified translating between DNS domains and X.400 addresses, which used "GB" as a country code.

With the end of X.400 e-mail and IANA's general aim of one TLD per country, use of .gb declined; the domain remains in existence, but it is not currently open to new domain registrations.

As of 2026, there are at least three subdomains resolving through DNS (although none serve a web page or use): hermes.dra.hmg.gb, delos.dra.hmg.gb, and dfhnet.dra.hmg.gb. They were originally owned by the Defence Research Agency, which became the Defence Evaluation and Research Agency in 1995 and was split into QinetiQ and the Defence Science and Technology Laboratory in 2001; the websites became defunct some time thereafter.

As of November 2022, Central Digital and Data Office's intention was to inform ICANN early in 2023 that the UK wishes to retire the .gb ccTLD.

== See also ==
- Internet in the United Kingdom
