= .it =

Top-level Internet domain for Italy

- Introduced: 23 December 1987 (in root zone); 1 January 1988 (fully active)
- TLD type: Country code top-level domain
- Status: Active
- Registry: IT-NIC
- Sponsor: IIT-CNR
- Intended use: Entities connected with Italy
- Actual use: Very popular in Italy; Commonly used as a domain hack in English-speaking countries (such as by Reddit)
- Registered domains: 3,472,839 (2022-01-31)
- Registration restrictions: The individual/organisation must be a citizen or resident of/headquartered in the countries of the European Economic Area (EEA), the Vatican State, the Republic of San Marino, the Swiss Confederation or the United Kingdom.
- Structure: Registration is permitted at second level; there are some third-level names beneath second-level labels, but these are not much used
- Documents: How to register .it domain.
- Dispute policies: Dispute procedure
- Registry website: Italy NIC

.it is the national top-level domain (ccTLD) assigned to Italy. Registration is open to organisations and individuals of legal age who are citizens or residents of/headquartered in the countries of the European Economic Area (EEA), the Vatican State, the Republic of San Marino and the Swiss Confederation. Since 11 July 2012, .it has also supported internationalised domain names.

== History ==
The first .it domain requested was that of the CNR (National Research Council: cnuce.cnr.it); the request was sent on 23 December 1987, and the domain became active on 1 January 1988. On 23 December 1987, IANA assigned the .it ccTLD to CNUCE, an institute of the CNR in Pisa, and the first name registered was that of the CNR's CNUCE. In 1997, the task was passed on to the Institute for Telematic Applications (Istituto per le Applicazioni Telematiche, IAT), also at the CNR in Pisa, which was born out of the necessary expansion of the 'Research Network Infrastructure Department' (Reparto Infrastrutture Reti per la Ricerca, RIRR) of the CNUCE.

Policies and rules were agreed with operators in the sector using a variety of forms. After the setting-up of the initial group, called MAIL-ITA, followed by ITA-PE 162 (which held its meetings at the CSELT) in 1994, 1998 saw the establishment of the Italian Naming Authority, which was responsible for drafting the rules for assigning '.it' domains until 2005. This structure differed from the Italian Registration Authority, which was responsible for keeping the Registry of names and made available the technical infrastructure needed to maintain it, thereby also including the management of authoritative DNS delegations. In 1999, the Naming Authority carried out a 'liberalisation' of the ccTLD by removing the limit on the number of domain names that could be registered for organisations of any kind. In the same year, management of the Registry passed to the Institute's Director Franco Denoth.

In 2001, a merger of several institutes of the CNR gave rise to the Institute of Informatics and Telematics, which consequently took over responsibility. In 2004, the limit on the number of registrations was also removed for natural persons. As of 2005, the Registry took over both regulatory and implementation functions with the establishment of an internal committee (the Steering Committee) that included representatives of the sector's operators. In 2009, the .it ccTLD Registry changed its name to Registro .it, the registry of Italian domains. Following Denoth's death in April 2006, the direction of the Institute (and thus of Registro) was temporarily taken over by Enrico Gregori on 17 May 2006, followed by Domenico Laforenza in 2008 and Marco Conti in 2019. Currently, the Institute is directed by Andrea Passarella. Since 11 July 2012, it has also been possible to register .it domains with non-ASCII characters (IDN), i.e., special characters, accented letters, etc.

== Reserved and/or special-use second-level domains ==
Second-level domains are the ones 'before' the .it, and can be of different types:

- .gov.it is the official second-level domain for the Government and Public Administration.
- .edu.it is the official second-level domain for educational institutions (schools, universities, etc.).
- .difesa.it is the official second-level domain for the Italian Armed Forces (excluding the Carabinieri).
- .esteri.it is the official second-level domain for the Italian Ministry of Foreign Affairs and Italian diplomatic and consular representatives.
- Domain names corresponding to provinces (e.g., palermo.it) and their acronyms (pa.it), municipalities, regions, etc. cannot be assigned; they are defined as geographical domains. It is possible to register third-level domains within them, e.g., comune.palermo.it is the domain assigned to the municipality of Palermo, while regione.lazio.it is the domain assigned to the regional government of Lazio. The second-level domain .co.it does not refer to business activities (as is often the case in other countries) but to the regional extension of the province of Como.
- There are domains reserved exclusively for government bodies, such as italia.it, italy.it, italie.it, etc.
