= .to =

Internet country-code top level domain for Tonga

- Introduced: 18 December 1995
- TLD type: Country code top-level domain
- Status: Active
- Registry: Tonga Network Information Center (Tonic)
- Sponsor: Government of Tonga
- Intended use: Entities connected with Tonga
- Actual use: Frequently for a varied assortment of sites, with a few related to Tonga. Often to illegal torrent platforms or services, technology startups in Toronto, domain hacks, and unlicensed digital streaming or online piracy websites.
- Registration restrictions: Open to everyone, but use for spam as well as some vulgar words are prohibited.
- Structure: Registrations permitted at second level; some Tonga-related entities have domains at third level under labels like .gov.to
- Documents: FAQ
- Dispute policies: Some trademarked names reserved; no other dispute policy
- Registry website: Tonic

Tonic logo

.to is the Internet country code top-level domain (ccTLD) of the Kingdom of Tonga.

The government of Tonga sells domains in its ccTLD to any interested party. The .to ccTLD is administered by the Tonga Network Information Center (Tonic).

== Background ==
The .to top-level domain was widely commercialized in 1997 by the San Francisco company Tonic Corp. (founded by Eric Gullichsen and Eric Lyons) which would sell domains at $100 each. They operated with the approval of Prince Siaosi, the then-Crown Prince of Tonga in response to controversy over Network Solutions, LLC's .to ccTLD registration practices. Domain requests were processed by the Tongan consulate in San Francisco.

The top-level domain to itself had an A record and an HTTP server since at least 1998.

== Description ==
To being a common English preposition has allowed the ccTLD to be used in memorable URLs known as domain hacks. URL shorteners, redirection services, and torrent aggregators (e.g. isohunt.to) are popular uses of the domain. Other domain hacks use to as a syllable inside a word, such as Daniel J. Bernstein's website cr.yp.to, or p.ota.to for the former London web development company Potato.

"T.O." is also a common nickname for Toronto, and is used as a city domain there and elsewhere in cities like Torino (Turin), Italy. It is also a domain hack in Slavic languages (to meaning it or that) – such as the uploading service uloz.to ("ulož to" means "save it" in Czech and Slovak).

All normal DNS operations are available for .to websites and registered sites are not required to display ads on behalf of the registrar. Some domains such as .edu.to or .gov.to are restricted to legitimate Tongan institutions. At this moment businesses registered in Tonga can also get free domains. People who sell on .to domains can claim a commission.

Tonic provides a WHOIS service at whois.tonicregistry.to.

The .to registry allows the creation of emoji domain names. A former .to registrar, Register.TO, did support the search and registration of .to emoji domain names. Register.TO is no longer an authorized registrar for .to domain names, following the death of its owner in early 2023 as stated by the NIC of Tonga.
