= .fi =

Internet country code top-level domain for Finland

- Introduced: 17 December 1986
- TLD type: Country code top-level domain
- Status: Active
- Registry: TRAFICOM
- Sponsor: TRAFICOM
- Intended use: Entities connected with Finland
- Actual use: Very popular in Finland
- Registered domains: 554,434 (2025-03-21)
- Structure: Registrations are taken directly at second level
- Documents: 1986 delegation application
- Dispute policies: Dispute policies
- DNSSEC: Yes
- Registry website: www.traficom.fi/en/fi-domains

Logo under the administration of FICORA

.fi is the Internet country code top-level domain (ccTLD) for Finland. It is operated by TRAFICOM, the Finnish Transport and Communications Agency.

On 4 December 1986, an application to register a top-level domain for Finland was sent by the Finnish Unix Users Group from Tampere. The application was accepted and the administration of .fi TLD was granted to Tampere University of Technology. Later the administration was transferred first to FICIX and later to TRAFICOM.

In the past TRAFICOM regulated .fi domains very strictly. Domain names were only admitted to company names or companies that owned trademarks. This policy led to Finnish companies applying for domains under other top-level domains. The policy was changed on 1 September 2003. Since September 2016 anyone worldwide is permitted to register domain names under the .fi TLD.

.fi was once best known among non-Finnish internet users as the TLD of the Penet remailer (anon.penet.fi), a privately operated server which enabled users to post e-mail and Usenet messages anonymously in the early 1990s. Another popular .fi address in the early 1990s was nic.funet.fi, one of the largest public file servers at the time which made Finland the only country outside the US that sent out more data than it received.

Since 1 September 2005, .fi domains may contain letters from the Finnish alphabet (ä, å, ö), though they are not recommended to be used as the primary domain. Since 1 March 2006, private persons have also been able to apply for a domain name. Some restrictions still apply, for example, company names or trademarks can only be applied for by the companies concerned.

It can also be (although not popular) be used for domain hacking as well. Examples like Spotify who has a domain hack called Spoti.fi.

FICORA began supporting Domain Name System Security (DNSSEC) on .fi domain names in late 2010.

== See also ==
- .ax, the top-level domain of Åland.
