= .mn =

Internet country code top-level domain for Mongolia

- Introduced: 2 March 1995
- TLD type: Country code top-level domain
- Status: Active
- Registry: .MN Registry
- Sponsor: .MN Registry, Datacom
- Intended use: Entities connected with Mongolia
- Actual use: Gets a good deal of use in Mongolia and some elsewhere (including Minnesota)
- Registration restrictions: Individual registrants must be over 18 years old; no other restrictions
- Structure: Registrations are directly at second level
- Documents: Registration Agreement
- Dispute policies: UDRP
- DNSSEC: yes
- Registry website: domain.mn

.mn is the Internet country code top-level domain (ccTLD) for Mongolia. It is administered by .MN Registry, Datacom. The .MN registry is operated under the thick registry model. Administrative, Billing, Technical and Registrant contacts are required. The Redemption Grace Period (RGP) is available for .MN domains.

The following second-level domains registration for free to qualifying entities:

- .gov.mn – government institutions
- .edu.mn – educational institutions
- .org.mn – non-profit organizations

.MN Registry signed the .mn zone with DNSSEC on 18 November 2010.

== Use outside Mongolia ==
The .mn domain name has been used to represent the U.S. state of Minnesota, such as by the Minnesota Legislature (senate.mn and house.mn), but such use is not official in the state. Technically, Minnesota is assigned .mn.us under the .us locality namespace.

The .mn domain elsewhere outside Mongolia is used primarily as a domain hack, for example vita.mn (a play on vitamin). Another example is cart.mn (a play on the South Park character Eric Cartman, which redirects to www.southparkstudios.com, the official website of this animated series).
