= Council of Country Code Administrators =

Non-profit organisation

The Council of Country Code Administrators (CoCCA), officially CoCCA Registry Services (NZ) Limited, is an Auckland, New Zealand-based company. Originally incorporated in Australia in 2003, CoCCA moved to New Zealand in January 2009. In addition to developing Shared Registry System software used by domain name registries of country code top-level domains (ccTLDs), CoCCA also acts as a forum for collaboration and harmonised policy development among member ccTLDs, has a Complaint Resolution Service, and offers purchasable support for TLD managers that includes training, data escrow, and failover sites. As of 2025, of the 308 ccTLDs that have been delegated by the Internet Assigned Numbers Authority, CoCCA software is used to manage 56, as well as being used by one non-country top-level domains.

In 2023, a security incident occurred where a local file disclosure vulnerability in their software that could be exploited to obtain any file on the local system was used to gain access to backups of the entire .ai registry. The software was later patched to fix the issue.
