= .ad =

Top-level Internet domain for Andorra

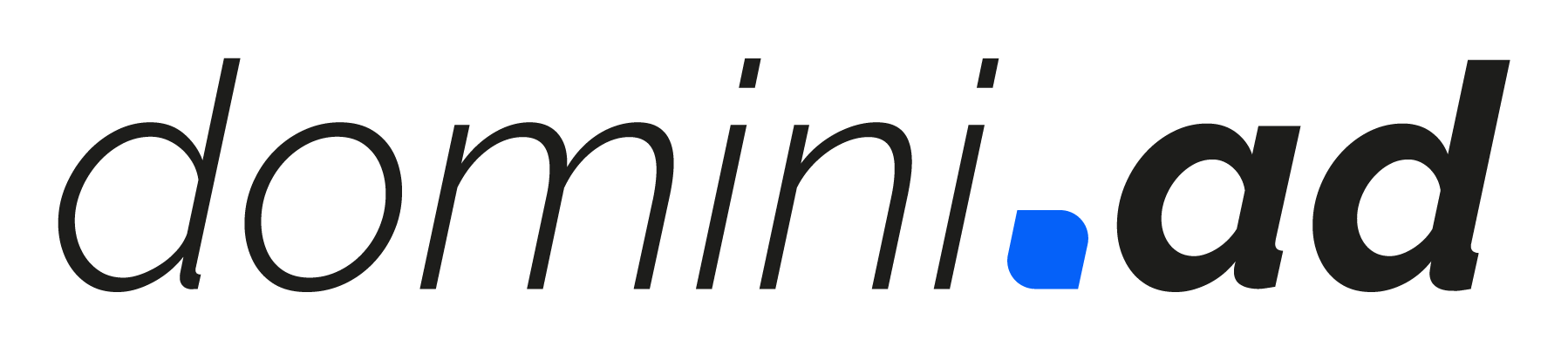
- Introduced: 9 January 1996
- TLD type: Country code top-level domain
- Status: Active
- Registry: Nic.ad
- Sponsor: Andorra Telecom
- Intended use: Entities connected with Andorra
- Actual use: Gets some use in Andorra
- Registration restrictions: None
- Structure: Names can be registered directly at the second level
- Documents: Legislation
- Registry website: domini.ad

.ad is the Internet country code top-level domain (ccTLD) for Andorra. It is administered by Andorra Telecom.

== History ==
.ad was originally only for Andorran registrants or trademark holders and each registration had to be pre-approved.

In 2024 the registry relaunched the TLD and revised all policies. Since 22 May 2024 it is a requirement to use an accredited registrar.

Before that date, registrants could buy domains directly from the registry, which was discontinued.

Since 22 October 2024 the registration policies were changed so that any natural or legal person worldwide can register a domain name under .ad.

Additionally, domains are not subject to prior validation anymore and are instead processed immediately. Registrars outside of Andorra are also able to accredit themselves since then.

== Domain hack ==
Because .ad is an abbreviation for the word advertisement or advert, .ad has also been used in an unconventional manner as a domain hack by some advertising media.

== See also ==
- .cat
