= Country code top-level domain =

Internet top-level domain generally used by or reserved for a country

A country code top-level domain (ccTLD) is an internet top-level domain generally used or reserved for a country, sovereign state, or dependent territory identified with a country code. All ASCII ccTLD identifiers are two letters long, and all two-letter top-level domains are ccTLDs.

Country code extension applications began in 1985. The registered country code extensions in that year included .il (Israel), .uk (United Kingdom) and .us (United States). The registered country code extensions in 1986 included .au (Australia), .de (Germany), .fi (Finland), .fr (France), .is (Iceland), .jp (Japan), .kr (South Korea), .nl (Netherlands) and .se (Sweden). The registered country code extensions in 1987 included .ar (Argentina), .ca (Canada), .ch (Switzerland), .cl (Chile), .dk (Denmark), .my (Malaysia), .nz (New Zealand) and .no (Norway). The registered country code extensions in 1988 included .at (Austria), .be (Belgium), .es (Spain), .ie (Ireland), .it (Italy), .pt (Portugal), .sg (Singapore) and .th (Thailand). The registered country code extensions in 1989 included .br (Brazil), .in (India), .mx (Mexico) and .tw (Taiwan). In the 1990s, .ae (United Arab Emirates), .cn (People's Republic of China), .cz (Czech Republic), .hk (Hong Kong), .pl (Poland), .ru (Russian Federation), .tr (Turkey) and .za (South Africa) were first registered.

In 2018, the Internet Assigned Numbers Authority (IANA) began implementing internationalized country code top-level domains, consisting of language-native characters when displayed in an end-user application. Creation and delegation of ccTLDs is described in RFC 1591, corresponding to ISO 3166-1 alpha-2 country codes. While gTLDs have to obey international regulations, ccTLDs are subjected to requirements that are determined by each country's domain name regulation corporation. With over 150 million domain name registrations in 2020, ccTLDs make up about 40% of the total domain name industry.

By the late 2010s, ccTLDs were widely used across the web, including on sites built with hosted website builders and domain services such as Wix, IONOS and Bluehost, which support registering or connecting a range of domain extensions, including country-code domains.

There are over 300 delegated ccTLDs. The .cn, .tk, .de, .uk, .nl and .ru ccTLDs contain the highest number of domains. The top ten ccTLDs account for more than five-eighths of registered ccTLD domains. There were about 153 million ccTLD domains registered at the end of March 2022.

== Delegation and management ==
IANA is responsible for determining an appropriate trustee for each ccTLD. Administration and control are then delegated to that trustee, which is responsible for the policies and operation of the domain. The current delegation can be determined from IANA's list of ccTLDs. Individual ccTLDs may have varying requirements and fees for registering subdomains. There may be a local-presence requirement (for instance, citizenship or other connection to the ccTLD), as, for example, the United States (us), Japanese (jp), Canadian (ca), French (fr) and German (de) domains, or registration may be open.

== Lists ==
As of 20 May 2017, there were 255 country-code top-level domains, purely in the Latin alphabet, using two-character codes. The number was 316 as of June 2020, with the addition of internationalized domains.

=== Latin Character ccTLDs ===
Overview of Latin-character country-code TLDs
Name	Entity	Explanation	Year Registered	Notes	Registry	IDN	DNSSEC	SLD	IPv6
.ac	Ascension Island (United Kingdom)	Ascension Island		Commonly used for academic websites, such as universities. However, .ac is not to be confused with the official academic domains used by several countries such as the United Kingdom (.ac.uk), India (.ac.in) or Indonesia (.ac.id). Also used in the accounting, consulting, and air-conditioning industries.	Ascension Island Network Information Centre (run by Internet Computer Bureau)	Yes	Yes	Yes	Yes
.ad	Andorra	Andorra		Local trademark, trade name or citizenship required. TLD commonly used for advertisement based websites.	Nic.ad	No	Yes	Yes	
.ae	UAE	UAE	1990+		.aeDA	No	No	Yes	
.af	Afghanistan	Afghanistan				No	Yes	Yes	
.ag	Antigua and Barbuda	Antigua		Also unofficially used by German businesses (where AG is an abbreviation of Aktiengesellschaft).		No	Yes	Yes	
.ai	Anguilla (United Kingdom)	Anguilla		Also unofficially used by tech companies specializing in AI (Artificial Intelligence).		No	Yes	Yes	
.al	Albania	Albania		Citizenship no longer required.		No	Yes	Yes	
.am	Armenia	Armenia		Also unofficially used by AM radio stations, podcasts or related business.		No	Yes	Yes	Yes
.an	Netherlands Antilles (Kingdom of the Netherlands)	Nederlandse Antillen		Restricted to registered Dutch companies, organisations and citizens		No	Yes	Yes	Yes
.ao	Angola	Angola				No	No	Unknown	
.aq	Antarctica	Antarctique		Defined by the Antarctic Treaty as everything south of latitude 60°S. AQ domain names are available to government organizations who are signatories to the Antarctic Treaty and to other registrants who have a physical presence in Antarctica. Domain names can be registered and renewed free of charge.		?	No	Yes	?
.ar	Argentina	Argentina	1987		nic.ar	Spanish (Note: 17 November 2009, Spanish-Portuguese specific characters (á, â, ã, à, é, ê, í, ó, ô, õ, ú, ü, ñ, ç) allowed, as approved by law.)	Yes	Yes	Yes
.as	American Samoa (United States)	American Samoa		In some countries, like Norway and Denmark, "AS" or "A/S" is used as an abbreviation for stock-based or limited companies. Such companies will often make use of the domain. Also unofficially used by the Principality of Asturias, Spain. Also used for the short URLs of McDonald's in Australia (e.g. food service feedback form "macc.as/feedback"), after the colloquial name "Maccas" used in the region.		Yes	Yes	Yes	
.at	Austria	Austria	1988		Nic.at	Yes (Note: Mostly latin characters (à á â ã ä å æ ç è é ê ë ì í î ï ð ñ ò ó ô õ ö ø ù ú û ü ý þ ÿ œ š ž), see)	Yes	Yes	Yes
.au	Australia	Australia	1986	Restrictions apply. In general, registrants must have an "Australian presence", and can be registered anywhere between 1 and 5 years. Includes Ashmore and Cartier Islands and Coral Sea Islands. Direct second-level domain registration (marketed as ".au Direct") has been made available commencing 24 March 2022.	auDA	No	Yes	Yes (*From 24 Mar 2022)	Yes
.aw	Aruba (Kingdom of the Netherlands)	Aruba, West Indies		Restricted to registered Aruban companies, organisations and citizens		No	Yes	Yes	
.ax	Åland (Finland)	.al and .ad already allocated				No	Yes	Yes	
.az	Azerbaijan	Azərbaycan		Only for Residents. Has no WHOIS-Server.		No	Yes	Yes	Yes
.ba	Bosnia and Herzegovina	Bosnia and Herzegovina			University of Sarajevo - University tele-informatic Centre	No	No	Yes	
.bb	Barbados	Barbados				No	No	Yes	
.bd	Bangladesh	Bangladesh		For individuals, registrant must have a valid NID. For companies, registrant must have company or trademark registered in Bangladesh.		Yes	Yes	Yes	Yes
.be	Belgium	Belgium	1988	Used for YouTube-related domains. Also unofficially used in the Canton of Bern, Switzerland.	DNS Belgium	Latin	Yes	Yes	Yes
.bf	Burkina Faso	Burkina Faso				No	No	Yes	
.bg	Bulgaria	Bulgaria		See also .бг (.bg in Cyrillic) for IDN ccTLD		Yes	Yes	Yes	
.bh	Bahrain	Bahrain				No	Yes	Yes	
.bi	Burundi	Burundi				No	Yes	Yes	
.bj	Benin	.be, .bn, and .bi already allocated				No	Yes	Yes	
.bl	Saint Barthélemy (France)	St. Barthélemy				No	No		
.bm	Bermuda (United Kingdom)	Bermuda		Local corporate registration required		No	Yes	Yes	
.bn	Brunei	Brunei				No	Yes	No	
.bo	Bolivia	Bolivia				No	No	Yes	
.bq	Caribbean Netherlands (Bonaire, Saba, and Sint Eustatius)	.be and .bs already allocated							
.br	Brasil	Brasil	1989	Restricted. Registration is done under several categories (i.e.: .edu.br for higher education institutions, .gov.br for government agencies, etc.).		Yes	Yes	No (Note: Currently not allowed, but some higher-learning institutions were grandfathered-in.)	
.bs	Bahamas	Bahamas				No	No	Yes	
.bt	Bhutan	Bhutan		Must have local presence in Bhutan, and valid trade license		No	Yes	No	
.bu	Socialist Republic of the Union of Burma	Burma					No	No	
.bv	Bouvet Island	Bouvet	1987		Norid	Yes	Yes	Yes	Yes
.bw	Botswana	Botswana		May also be used for the Province of Walloon Brabant, Wallonia, Belgium		No	Yes	Yes	
.by	Belarus	Byelorussia		Also unofficially used to denote Bayern (Bavaria), Germany		No	Yes	Yes	
.bz	Belize	Belize		Also unofficially used in the province of Bozen (or South Tyrol, see .st)		No	Yes	Yes	
.ca	Canada	Canada	1987	Subject to Canadian Presence Requirements. Also unofficially used by some websites in the U.S. state of California.	CIRA	French	Yes	Yes	Yes
.cc	Cocos (Keeling) Islands	Cocos Islands		Australian territory: not to be confused with Cocos Island in Guam. Currently marketed as global domain, registration allowed worldwide, local presence not required; the domain is currently operated by eNIC, a VeriSign company.		Yes	Yes	Yes	
.cd	DRC	Congolese Democratic Republic		Also unofficially used for Compact disc-related domains.		No	No	Yes	
.cf	Central African Republic	Central Africa		Also used as a free domain service to the public.	Freenom (for free domains)	Yes	No	Yes	
.cg	Congo	Congo				No	No	Yes	
.ch	Switzerland	Confoederatio Helvetica	1987		SWITCH	Yes (Note: Since March 2004, see)	Yes	Yes	
.ci	Ivory Coast	Côte d'Ivoire				No	Yes	Yes	
.ck	Cook Islands	Cook Islands				No	No	Yes	
.cl	Chile	Chile	1987		NIC Chile	Yes	Yes	Yes	Yes
.cm	Cameroon	Cameroon		A local entity / company in Cameroon is required to register a domain name.		No	Yes	Yes	
.cn	PRC	China	1990+	A local company in China is required to register a domain name, or for personal registrations a valid Resident Identity Card. See ICP license for more information regarding registrations. Hong Kong and Macau also maintain TLDs. Also unofficially used for Cartoon Network-related domains.	CNNIC	Yes	Yes	Yes	Yes
.co	Colombia	Colombia		Marketed as a global domain. Anyone can register.		No	Yes	Yes	
.cr	Costa Rica	Costa Rica				No	Yes	Yes	
.cs	Serbia and Montenegro / Czechoslovakia	Crna Gora, Srbija / Československo		Still in use. Also unofficially used by Student Unions.		Yes (Note: (28 April 2008))	Yes	Yes	Yes
.cu	Cuba	Cuba				No	No	Yes	
.cv	Cape Verde	Cape Verde		Also unofficially used for curriculum vitae-related domains.		No	No	Yes	
.cw	Curaçao (Kingdom of the Netherlands)	Curaçao, West Indies					No	Unknown	
.cx	Christmas Island	Christmas Xmas		Made infamous from Goatse.cx Also unofficially used for customer experience related domains.		No	Yes	Yes	
.cy	Cyprus	Cyprus				No	Yes	Yes	
.cz	Czech Republic	Czechia	1990+			No (Note: IDN not adopted due to lack of public and corporate interest)	Yes	Yes	
.de	Germany	Deutschland (The native name for Germany)	1986	German postal address for administrative contact (admin-c) required. Proxy registrations are allowed.	DENIC	Yes (Note: 93 non-ASCII characters, see)	Yes	Yes	Yes
.dg	Diego Garcia (United Kingdom)	Diego Garcia				Yes	Yes	Yes	
.dj	Djibouti	Djibouti		Also unofficially used by disc jockeys.		No	No	Yes	
.dk	Denmark	Danmark	1987		DK Hostmaster	Yes (Note: 1 January 2004, support æ, ø, å, ö, ä, ü, & é: see)	Yes	Yes	Yes
.dm	Dominica	Dominica				No	Yes	Yes	
.do	Dominican Republic	República Dominicana				No	No	Yes	
.dz	Algeria	El Djazair / Dzayer				No	Yes	Yes	
.ec	Ecuador	Ecuador		In Japan, "EC" is used as an acronym for "electronic commerce". Because of that, it's used unofficially by companies dedicated to provide online stores like BASE, a company that has two domains related to e-commerce: "base.in" and "official.ec".	Nic.ec	No	Yes	Yes	
.ee	Estonia	Eesti Vabariik				Yes (Note: Estonian domain names to incorporate diacritics (IDN) starting from 13 June 2011)	Yes	Yes	
.eg	Egypt	Egypt				No	No	Yes	
.eh	Western Sahara	Español Sahara		Unassigned		No	No	No	
.er	Eritrea	Eritrea					Yes	Yes	
.es	Spain	España	1988		Red.es	Yes	Yes	Yes	
.et	Ethiopia	Ethiopia				No	Yes	No	
.eu	European Union	European Union		Restricted to legal and natural persons in European Union member states. Previously unofficially used for sites in the Basque language, but now .eus is in official use.	EURid	Yes (Note: Supported characters: Latin, Greek, & Cyrillic; see)	Yes	Yes	Yes
.fi	Finland	Finland	1986	Registration allowed worldwide, local presence not required.	TRAFICOM	Yes (Note: September 2005, supported characters: š, ž, å, ä, ö and Sami language; see)	Yes	Yes	Yes
.fj	Fiji	Fiji				No	Yes	Yes	
.fk	Falkland Islands (United Kingdom)	Falkland				No	No	No	
.fl	Principality of Liechtenstein	Fürstentum Liechtenstein				No	No	No	
.fm	FSM	FSM		Also unofficially used by FM radio stations, podcasts or related business.		Yes	Yes	Yes	
.fo	Faroe Islands (Kingdom of Denmark)	Føroyar			FO Council	No	Yes	Yes	
.fr	France	France	1986	Restricted to individuals and companies in European Union, Switzerland, Norway, Iceland and Liechtenstein. (Note: (6 December 2011))	AFNIC	Yes	Yes	Yes	
.fx	Metropolitan France	.fr, .mf, and .tr already allocated	1986			Yes	Yes		
.ga	Gabon	Gabon				Yes	Yes	Yes	
.gb	Great Britain	Great Britain				Yes	Yes	Yes	
.gd	Grenada	Grenada				No	Yes	Yes	
.ge	Georgia	Georgia		Available for registration for resident and non-resident natural person or legal entity.		No	Yes	Yes	
.gf	French Guiana (France)	Guyane Française				No	No		
.gg	Guernsey	.gu, .gs, and .gy already allocated		Also unofficially used by video game-related websites (see GG (gaming))	Island Networks Ltd.	Yes	Yes	Yes	
.gh	Ghana	Ghana				No	No	No	
.gi	Gibraltar (United Kingdom)	Gibraltar				No	Yes	Yes	
.gl	Greenland (Kingdom of Denmark)	Greenland		Previously also unofficially used in Galicia, Spain, but now .gal has been approved for such use and was implemented in mid-2014		No	Yes	Yes	
.gm	The Gambia	Gambia		Domain name should match the domain owner's name or trademarks. Common nouns are blocked.		No	No	Yes	
.gn	Guinea	Guinea		A local contact is required		No	Yes	No	
.gp	Guadeloupe (France)	Guadeloupe		Still used for Saint-Barthélemy and Saint-Martin		No	No	Yes	
.gq	Equatorial Guinea	Guinée équatoriale		Also used as a free domain service to the public.		Yes	No		
.gr	Greece	Greece				Yes (Note: Support for Greek characters since July 2005; see)	Yes	Yes	
.gs	South Georgia and the South Sandwich Islands (United Kingdom)	South Georgia and the South Sandwich Islands				No	Yes	Yes	
.gt	Guatemala	Guatemala				Yes	No	Yes	Yes
.gu	Guam (United States)	Guam				No	No	No	
.gw	Guinea-Bissau	Gine-Bisaawo				No	Yes	Yes	
.gy	Guyana	Guyana				No	Yes	Yes	
.hk	Hong Kong	Hong Kong	1990+		Hong Kong Internet Registration Corporation Ltd.	Yes	Yes	Yes	Yes
.hm	Heard Island and McDonald Islands	Heard Island and McDonald Islands		Unused for its intended purposes (islands are uninhabited and government sites instead use .aq); registry open to the public.		No	No	Yes	
.hn	Honduras	Honduras				No	Yes	Yes	
.hr	Croatia	Hrvatska				No	Yes	Yes	
.ht	Haiti	Haiti				Yes	No	Yes	
.hu	Hungary	Hungary		Citizens of the European Union or entities established by law within the territory of the EU		Yes	Yes	Yes	
.ic	Canary Islands	Las Islas Canarias	1988			Yes	Yes	Yes	
.id	Indonesia	Indonesia		Restricted to Indonesian companies (co.id), organisations (or.id), academic (ac.id & sch.id) and citizens (biz.id, my.id & web.id). Second-level domains are becoming available now and opened to general registration on 17 August 2014.	PANDI	Yes	Yes	Yes	
.ie	Ireland	Ireland	1988	In 2002, registration was expanded to include persons or businesses with a "real and substantive" connection with the island of Ireland (including Northern Ireland).		Yes	Yes	Yes	Yes
.il	Israel	Israel	1985	Some use in Illinois		Yes	Yes	Yes	
.im	Isle of Man	Isle of Man				No	No	Yes	
.in	India	India	1989	Under INRegistry since April 2005 (except for gov.in, nic.in, mil.in, ac.in, edu.in, res.in).	NIXI	Yes	Yes	Yes	Yes
.io	British Indian Ocean Territory (United Kingdom)	Indian Ocean		Used unofficially by technology companies, startups, and web applications because IO can be an acronym for input / output that is useful for domain hacks.	NIC.IO (run by Internet Computer Bureau)	Yes	Yes	Yes	
.iq	Iraq	Iraq				No	Partial (Note: Delegation Signer (DS) record in a root zone has not yet been published.)	Yes	
.ir	Iran	Iran			IRNIC	Yes	No	Yes	
.is	Iceland	Ísland	1986	Also unofficially used and marketed as a domain hack (for example it.is, that.is, etc.).	ISNIC	Yes	Yes	Yes	
.it	Italy	Italy	1988	Restricted to companies and individuals in the European Union.		Yes	Yes	Yes	Yes
.ja	Jamaica	Jamaica				No	No	No	
.je	Jersey	Jersey			Island Networks Ltd.	Yes	No	Yes	
.jm	Jamaica	Jamaica				No	No	No	
.jo	Jordan	Jordan					No	Yes	
.jp	Japan	Japan	1986	Restricted to individuals or companies with a physical address in Japan.	Japan Registry Services	Yes	Yes	Yes	Yes
.ke	Kenya	Kenya				No	No	No	
.kg	Kyrgyzstan	Kyrgyz				No	Yes	Yes	
.kh	Cambodia	Khmer				No	No	No	
.ki	Kiribati	Kiribati				No	Yes	Yes	
.km	Comoros	Komori				No	No	Yes	
.kn	SKN	SKN				No	No	Yes	
.kp	DPRK	Korean Democratic People’s Republic		Restricted to companies, organizations, or government entities based in North Korea. Despite this, few domains are actually registered because of internet censorship in North Korea.		No	No	No	No
.kr	ROK	Korean Republic	1986			Yes	Yes	Yes	
.kw	Kuwait	Kuwait					Yes	No	
.ky	Cayman Islands (United Kingdom)	.ci and .cy already allocated				No	Yes	Yes	
.kz	Kazakhstan	Kazakhstan				Yes	No	Yes	
.la	Laos	Lao People’s Democratic Republic		Currently being marketed as the unofficial domain for Los Angeles.			Yes	Yes	
.lb	Lebanon	Lebanon		Restricted to registration with a company in Lebanon			Yes	No	
.lc	Saint Lucia	St. Lucia					Yes	Yes	
.li	Liechtenstein	Liechtenstein		Also unofficially used by entities on Long Island, New York or people with the last name Li. In Russian, li can be used to create domain names that mean a verb with a past tense plural ending li .	SWITCH	Yes	Yes	Yes	
.lk	Sri Lanka	Sri Lanka				Yes	Yes	Yes	
.lr	Liberia	Liberia					Partial	No	
.ls	Lesotho	Lesotho					No	No	
.lt	Lithuania	Lietuvos Respublika				Yes	Yes	Yes	
.lu	Luxembourg	Lëtzebuerg		Also unofficially used in Lucerne, Switzerland		Yes	Yes	Yes	
.lv	Latvia	Latvijas Republika		Currently being marketed as the unofficial domain for Las Vegas.	IMCS UL	Yes	Yes	Yes	
.ly	Libya	Libya		Used unofficially as a domain hack for words ending in -ly.			Yes	Yes	
.ma	Morocco	Maroc / Al-Maghrib	1992	The registrar must be based in Morocco or have a legal representative in the country. WHOIS privacy is prohibited by the national regulator.	ANRT (Agence nationale de réglementation des télécommunications)	Partial (Note: Only supports Accented Latin, no support for Arabic script as of July 2026.)	Yes	Yes	Yes
.mc	Monaco	Monaco		Only for companies with a trademark registered in Monaco.			Yes	Yes	
.md	Moldova	Moldova		Restricted to individuals or companies with a physical address in Moldova.			Yes	Yes	
.me	Montenegro	Montenegro		Also unofficially used and marketed as a domain hack (for example love.me, plstag.me, etc.).			Yes	Yes	
.mf	Saint Martin (France)	Saint Martin, French				Yes	Yes	Yes	
.mg	Madagascar	Madagascar		Restricted to registration with a company in Madagascar	NIC-MG		No	Yes	
.mh	Marshall Islands	Marshall		Inactive			No		
.mk	North Macedonia	Makedonija		Restricted to individuals and companies in European Union.			No	Yes	
.ml	Mali	Mali		Also used as a free domain service to the public.	Freenom (for free domains)	Yes	No	Yes	
.mm	Myanmar	Myanmar					No	No	
.mn	Mongolia	Mongolia		The second-level domains .gov.mn, .org.mn, and .edu.mn are reserved for special use. See .mn for more information.			Yes	Yes	
.mo	Macao	Macao		Registrants must have a registered business in Macau, with the same name as the domain they wish to register.	Macao Post and Telecommunications Bureau (CTT)	Yes	No	Yes	Yes
.mp	NMI (United States)	Mariana's Pacific					No	Yes	
.mq	Martinique (France)	Martinique					No	No	
.mr	Mauritania	Mauritania					Yes	Yes	
.ms	Montserrat (United Kingdom)	Montserrat		Also unofficially used for Microsoft-related domains.			No	Yes	
.mt	Malta	Malta					No	No	
.mu	Mauritius	Mauritius					No	Yes	
.mv	Maldives	Maldive					No	Yes	
.mw	Malawi	Malawi					No	Yes	
.mx	Mexico	México	1989				Yes	Yes	
.my	Malaysia	Malaysia	1987	Restricted to registration by an individual or company in Malaysia	MYNIC	Yes	Yes	Yes	
.mz	Mozambique	Mozambique					No	No	
.na	Namibia	Namibia					Yes	Yes	
.nc	New Caledonia (France)	New Caledonia		Restricted to companies that have a New Caledonian Business Registration Certificate or individuals living in New Caledonia for at least 6 months.			Yes	Yes	
.ne	Niger	Niger					No	Yes	
.nf	Norfolk Island	Norfolk					Yes	Yes	
.ng	Nigeria	Nigeria					No	Yes	
.ni	Nicaragua	Nicaragua					No	No	
.nl	The Netherlands	Nederland	1986	First active country-code domain outside the US.		No	Yes	Yes	Yes
.no	Norway	Norge	1987	Businesses and professionals must be registered as an approved type of organization in the Brønnøysund Register Centre. Individual applicants must be of age (18 years) and be registered in Folkeregisteret. All applicants must have a Norwegian postal address.	Norid	Yes	Yes	Yes	Yes
.np	Nepal	Nepal		All .np domains are free to register for individuals and registered businesses. Foreign businesses must provide proof of local presence in Nepal.			No	No	
.nr	Nauru	Nauru		Was previously used as a free domain service to the public as co.nr.			No	Yes	
.nu	Niue	Niue		Commonly used by Danish, Dutch, and Swedish websites, because in their languages "nu" means "now".	The Swedish Internet Foundation	Yes	Yes	Yes	Yes
.nz	New Zealand	New Zealand	1987			Māori	Yes	Yes	Yes
.om	Oman	Oman		Registrant must have company or trademark registered in Oman as well as a local administrative contact.			No	No	
.pa	Panama	Panamá		Some use in Pennsylvania			No	No	
.pe	Peru	Peru		Also unofficially used for Private Equity-related businesses.		Yes	Yes	Yes	
.pf	French Polynesia (France)	Polynésie française		With Clipperton Island			No	Yes	
.pg	Papua New Guinea	Papua New Guinea					No	No	
.ph	Philippines	Philippine Islands					Yes	Yes	
.pk	Pakistan	Pakistan		Operated by PKNIC since 1992			No	Yes	
.pl	Poland	Polska	1990+			Yes	Yes	Yes	
.pm	Saint Pierre and Miquelon (France)	Saint Pierre and Miquelon		Restricted to individuals and companies in European Union, Switzerland, Norway, Iceland, and Liechtenstein.	AFNIC	Yes	Yes		
.pn	Pitcairn Islands (United Kingdom)	Pitcairn		As a part of a marketing campaign, Lionsgate used the TLD for some (now defunct) sites related to The Hunger Games franchise, presenting it as the "official" country code of the fictional nation of Panem; notable sites included thecapitol.pn and revolution.pn.			No	Yes	
.pr	Puerto Rico (United States)	Puerto Rico					Yes	Yes	
.ps	Palestine	Palestine		Jerusalem, West Bank and Gaza Strip.			No	Yes	
.pt	Portugal	Portugal	1988		Associação DNS.PT	Portuguese	Yes	Yes	Yes
.pw	Palau	Pelew				Yes	Yes	Yes	Yes
.py	Paraguay	Paraguay					No	No	
.qa	Qatar	Qatar					No	No	
.re	Réunion (France)	Réunion		Restricted to individuals and companies in European Union, Switzerland, Norway, Iceland, and Liechtenstein.	AFNIC	Yes	Yes	Yes	
.rh	Haiti	Republic of Haiti				Yes	No	Yes	
.ri	Indonesia	Republic of Indonesia				Yes	No	Yes	
.ro	Romania	Romania				Yes	Yes	Yes	Yes
.rs	Serbia	Republika Srbija		See also .срб (.srb in Cyrillic). Also unofficially used for Rust (programming language)-related domains.		Yes	Yes	Yes	Yes
.ru	Russia	Russia	1990+	See also .su, still in use, and .рф, for IDN.		No	Yes	Yes	Yes
.rw	Rwanda	Rwanda			RICTA		No	Yes	
.sa	KSA	KSA		Registrant must have a registered trademark in Saudi Arabia matching the domain name to register or provide company incorporation documents of a company in Saudi Arabia or for personal registrations a copy of valid ID. A letter on the official letterhead of your organization addressed to SaudiNIC requesting the domain name registration is also required. Local administrative contact required. 2LD registrations rolled out in 2011.		Arabic	Yes	Yes	Yes
.sb	Solomon Islands	Solomon Islands of Britain					Yes	No	
.sc	Seychelles	Seychelles		Also unofficially used for Snapchat-related domains.			Yes	Yes	
.sd	Sudan	Sudan					No	Yes	
.se	Sweden	Sverige	1986		The Swedish Internet Foundation	Yes (Note: October 2003, for Swedish characters, summer 2007 also for Finnish, Meänkieli, Romani, Sami, and Yiddish; see)	Yes	Yes	Yes
.sg	Singapore	Singapore	1988	Also unofficially used in the Canton of St. Gallen, Switzerland			Yes	Yes	
.sh	Saint Helena (United Kingdom)	St. Helena			NIC.SH (run by Internet Computer Bureau)	Yes	Yes	Yes	
.si	Slovenia	Slovenia				Yes (Note: Since October 2010, see)	Yes	Yes	
.sj	SJM	SJM	1987		Norid	Yes	Yes	Yes	Yes
.sk	Slovakia	Slovensko		Restricted to individuals and companies in European Union, Switzerland, Norway, Iceland, and Liechtenstein.			Yes	Yes	Yes
.sl	Sierra Leone	Sierra Leone					No	Yes	
.sm	San Marino	San Marino		Domain name must be same as company name or trademark.			No	Yes	
.sn	Senegal	Senegal		Registration allowed for companies only. Individuals are not allowed to register.			Yes	Yes	
.so	Somalia	Somalia		Relaunched on 1 November 2010.	SONIC	No	No	Yes	
.sr	Suriname	Suriname					No	Yes	
.ss	South Sudan	South Sudan					Yes		
.st	São Tomé and Príncipe	São Tomé		Also unofficially used in South Tyrol (or province of Bozen, see .bz).		Yes	No	Yes	
.su	Soviet Union	Soviet Union		Still in use. Also unofficially used by Student Unions.		Yes (Note: (28 April 2008) see)	Yes	Yes	Yes
.sv	El Salvador	Salvador					No	No	
.sx	Sint Maarten (Kingdom of the Netherlands)	.sm, .ma, and .mt already allocated; airport code is SXM					Yes	No	
.sy	Syria	Syria					No	Yes	
.sz	Swaziland	Swaziland		Registration is restricted to Eswatini organizations with Eswatini Trading Licenses.			No	No	
.tc	Turks and Caicos Islands (United Kingdom)	Turks and Caicos		Also marketed in Turkey. The official abbreviation of 'Türkiye Cumhuriyeti' (Republic of Turkey) is TC.			No	Yes	
.td	Chad	Tchad		Available for registration to entities connected with Chad only.			No	Yes	
.tf	French Southern Territories	Terres australes et antarctiques françaises		Seldom used. Restricted to individuals and companies in European Union, Switzerland, Norway, Iceland, and Liechtenstein. The domain also sees frequent use for community-run sites related to the video game Team Fortress 2.	AFNIC	Yes	Yes	Yes	
.tg	Togo	Togo					No	Yes	
.th	Thailand	Thai	1988			Yes	Yes	No	
.tj	Tajikistan	Tajik					No	Yes	
.tk	Tokelau	Tokelau		Also used as a free domain service to the public.	Freenom (for free domains)	Yes	No	Yes	
.tl	Timor Leste	Timor Leste		Old code .tp has been deactivated since 2015.			Yes	Yes	
.tm	Turkmenistan	Türkmen				Yes	Yes	Yes	
.tn	Tunisia	Tunisia		Currently being marketed as the unofficial domain for Tamil Nadu		Yes	Yes	Yes	Yes
.to	Tonga	Tonga		Often used unofficially for Torrent, Turin (Torino in Italian), Toronto, Tokyo, or Tocantins, and also as a domain hack in Slavic languages (to meaning it).		Yes	No	Yes	
.tr	Turkey	Turkey	1990+	.ct.tr and .nc.tr used by Northern Cyprus		Yes (Note: 14 November 2006; see)	Yes (Note: 14 March 2023; see)	Yes	Yes (Note: 21 July 2015; see)
.tt	Tobago	Trinidad & Tobago					Yes	Yes	
.tv	Tuvalu	Tuvalu		Used as an abbreviation of television, the domain is currently operated by dotTV, a VeriSign company; the Tuvalu government owns twenty percent of the company.			Yes	Yes	
.tw	Taiwan	Taiwan	1989	Registration allowed worldwide, local presence not required. In line with ISO 3166-1, IANA's official position is that "TW" is "designated for use to represent Taiwan, Province of China".	TWNIC	Yes (Note: Traditional Chinese characters: see)	Yes	Yes	Yes
.tz	Tanzania	Tanzania		TLD registrations allowed as of July 2022, no local presence in Tanzania required.	TCRA		Yes	No	
.ua	Ukraine	Ukraina			Hostmaster Ltd.		Yes	Yes	
.ug	Uganda	Uganda			Uganda Online Ltd.		Yes	Yes	
.um	United States Minor Outlying Islands (United States)	U.S. Minor Outlying Islands	1985	Registrants must be United States citizens, residents, or organizations, or a foreign entity with a presence in the United States. Formerly commonly used by U.S. State and local governments, see also .gov TLD.	Go Daddy		Yes	Yes	
.un	United Nations	United Nations				No	Yes	Yes	
.uk	UK	UK	1985	The ISO 3166-1 code for the United Kingdom is GB (for Great Britain). UK is a specially reserved ISO 3166-1 code. However, the creation of the .uk TLD predates the ISO 3166-1 list of ccTLD and is the primary TLD for the United Kingdom.	Nominet UK		Yes	Yes	Yes
.us	USA	U.S.	1985	Registrants must be United States citizens, residents, or organizations, or a foreign entity with a presence in the United States. Formerly commonly used by U.S. State and local governments, see also .gov TLD.	Go Daddy		Yes	Yes	
.uy	Uruguay	Uruguay		2LD rollout began on 10 July 2012.			Yes	Yes	
.uz	Uzbekistan	Uzbek			Uzinfocom		Yes	Yes	
.va	Vatican	Vatican City		Limited to the official sites of the Holy See (including those of the Vatican City State).			No	No	
.vc	SVG	St. Vincent					Partial	Yes	
.ve	Venezuela	Venezuela		Registration is at the third level.			Yes	No	
.vg	BVI (United Kingdom)	Virgin Islands					No	Yes	
.vi	USVI (United States)	Virgin Islands					No	Yes	
.vn	Việt Nam	Việt Nam				Yes	Yes	Yes	
.vu	Vanuatu	Vanuatu					Yes	Yes	
.wf	WAF	Wallis & Futuna		Restricted to individuals and companies in European Union, Switzerland, Norway, Iceland, and Liechtenstein.	AFNIC	Yes	Yes	Yes	
.ws	Samoa	Western Samoa		Marketed for use in general Websites		Yes	Yes	Yes	
.xk	Kosovo			Not a real TLD in the root zone - not official UN nation so no official TLD		Yes	Yes	Yes	
.ye	Yemen	Yemen					No	No	
.yt	Mayotte	Mayotte		Restricted to individuals and companies in European Union, Switzerland, Norway, Iceland and Liechtenstein. Also unofficially used for YouTube-related domains.	AFNIC	Yes	Yes	Yes	
.yu	Yugoslavia	Yugoslavia		Still in use.		Yes (Note: (28 April 2008))	Yes	Yes	Yes
.za	RSA	Zuid-Afrika	1990+	.za derives from the Dutch name of the country, even though Dutch is no longer an official language.	ZA Domain Name Authority		Yes	Yes	
.zm	Zambia	Zambia					No	Yes (Note: Restricted to ISPs and other undefined entities. See .zm .)	
.zr	Zaire	Zaire				No	No	Yes	
.zw	Zimbabwe	Zimbabwe					No	No	
Name	Entity	Explanation	Year Registered	Notes	Registry	IDN	DNSSEC	SLD	IPv6

==== Table notes ====
Table columns – legend
- Name: DNS name of the two-letter country-code top-level domain. (Note: They follow ISO 3166-1 alpha-2, with some exceptions such as ".ac" for Ascension Island, ".eu" for the European Union, or ".uk" for United Kingdom of Great Britain and Northern Ireland instead of ".gb". ISO codes bl, mf, gb, and um are not used for country code top-level domains.)
- Entity: Country, dependency, or region
- Explanation: Explanation of the code when it is not self-evident from the English name of the country. These are usually domains that arise from native name of the country. (Note: e.g. .de for Deutschland, German language name for Germany.)
- Notes: General remarks
- Registry: Domain name registry operator, sometimes called a network information center (NIC)
- IDN: Support for internationalized domain names (IDN)
- DNSSEC: Presence of DS records for Domain Name System Security Extensions
- SLD: Second level domain
- IPv6: Registry fully supports IPv6 access

=== Internationalized ccTLDs ===
Internationalized country code top-level domains
DNS name	IDN ccTLD	Country/Region	Language	Script	Transliteration	Comments	Other ccTLD	DNSSEC
xn--lgbbat1ad8j	.الجزائر	Algeria	Arabic	Arabic (Arabic)	al-Jazā'ir		.dz	No
xn--y9a3aq	.հայ	Armenia	Armenian	Armenian	hay		.am	Yes
xn--mgbcpq6gpa1a	.البحرين	Bahrain	Arabic	Arabic	al-Baḥrain	Not in use	.bh	Yes
xn--54b7fta0cc	.বাংলা	Bangladesh	Bengali	Bengali	Bangla		.bd	No
xn--90ais	.бел	Belarus	Belarusian	Cyrillic	bel		.by	Yes
xn--90ae	.бг	Bulgaria	Bulgarian	Cyrillic	bg		.bg	Yes
xn--fiqs8s	.中国	China	Chinese	Chinese (Simplified)	Zhōngguó		.cn	Yes
xn--fiqz9s	.中國	China	Chinese	Chinese (Traditional)	Zhōngguó		.cn	Yes
xn--wgbh1c	.مصر	Egypt	Arabic	Arabic (Arabic)	Miṣr / Maṣr		.eg	Yes
xn--e1a4c	.ею	European Union	Bulgarian	Cyrillic	eyu		.eu	Yes
xn--qxa6a	.ευ	European Union	Greek	Greek	ey	In use since 2022	.eu	Yes
xn--node	.გე	Georgia	Georgian	Georgian (Mkhedruli)	GE		.ge	No
xn--qxam	.ελ	Greece	Greek	Greek	el	In use since July 2018	.gr	Yes
xn--j6w193g	.香港	Hong Kong	Chinese	Chinese (Simplified and Traditional)	Hoeng^{1} gong^{2} / Xiānggǎng		.hk	Yes
xn--h2brj9c	.भारत	India	Hindi	Devanagari	Bhārat	Became available 27 August 2014	.in	Yes
xn--mgbbh1a71e	.بھارت	India	Urdu	Arabic (Urdu)	Bhārat	Became available 2017	.in	Yes
xn--fpcrj9c3d	.భారత్	India	Telugu	Telugu	Bhārat	Became available 2017	.in	Yes
xn--gecrj9c	.ભારત	India	Gujarati	Gujarati	Bhārat	Became available 2017	.in	Yes
xn--s9brj9c	.ਭਾਰਤ	India	Punjabi	Gurmukhī	Bhārat	Became available 2017	.in	Yes
xn--xkc2dl3a5ee0h	.இந்தியா	India	Tamil	Tamil	Intiyā	Became available 2015	.in	Yes
xn--45brj9c	.ভারত	India	Bengali	Bengali	Bharôt	Became available 2017	.in	Yes
xn--2scrj9c	.ಭಾರತ	India	Kannada	Kannada	Bhārata	Became available 2020	.in	Yes
xn--rvc1e0am3e	.ഭാരതം	India	Malayalam	Malayalam	Bhāratam	Became available 2020	.in	Yes
xn--45br5cyl	.ভাৰত	India	Assamese	Bengali	Bharatam	Became available 2022	.in	Yes
xn--3hcrj9c	.ଭାରତ	India	Oriya	Oriya	Bhārat	Became available 2021	.in	Yes
xn--mgbbh1a	.بارت	India	Kashmiri	Arabic (Kashmiri)	Bārat	Became available 2022	.in	Yes
xn--h2breg3eve	.भारतम्	India	Sanskrit	Devanagari	Bhāratam	Became available 2022	.in	Yes
xn--h2brj9c8c	.भारोत	India	Santali	Devanagari	Bharot	Became available 2022	.in	Yes
xn--mgbgu82a	.ڀارت	India	Sindhi	Arabic (Sindhi)	Bhārat	Became available 2022	.in	Yes
xn--mgba3a4f16a	.ایران	Iran	Persian	Arabic (Persian)	Īrān		.ir	No
xn--mgbtx2b	.عراق	Iraq	Arabic	Arabic (Arabic)	ʿIrāq	Not in use	.iq	No
xn--4dbrk0ce	.ישראל	Israel	Hebrew	Hebrew	Israel	Became available 2022	.il	Yes
xn--mgbayh7gpa	.الاردن	Jordan	Arabic	Arabic (Arabic)	al-Urdun		.jo	No
xn--80ao21a	.қаз	Kazakhstan	Kazakh	Cyrillic (Kazakh)	qaz		.kz	No
xn--q7ce6a	.ລາວ	Laos	Lao	Lao	Lao	Became available 2020	.la	Yes
xn--mix082f	.澳门	Macao	Chinese	Chinese (Simplified)	Ou^{3} mun^{4} / Àomén	Not in use	.mo	No
xn--mix891f	.澳門	Macao	Chinese	Chinese (Traditional)	Ou^{3} mun^{4} / Àomén	Became available 2020	.mo	No
xn--mgbx4cd0ab	.مليسيا	Malaysia	Malay	Arabic (Jawi)	Malaysīyā		.my	Yes
xn--mgbah1a3hjkrd	.موريتانيا	Mauritania	Arabic	Arabic (Arabic)	Mūrītāniyā		.mr	Yes
xn--l1acc	.мон	Mongolia	Mongolian	Cyrillic (Mongolian)	mon		.mn	Yes
xn--mgbc0a9azcg	.المغرب	Morocco	Arabic	Arabic (Arabic)	al-Maġrib		.ma	No
xn--d1alf	.мкд	North Macedonia	Macedonian	Cyrillic (Macedonian)	mkd		.mk	No
xn--mgb9awbf	.عمان	Oman	Arabic	Arabic (Arabic)	ʿUmān		.om	No
xn--mgbai9azgqp6j	.پاکستان	Pakistan	Urdu	Arabic (Urdu)	Pākistān		.pk	Yes
xn--ygbi2ammx	.فلسطين	Palestinian Authority	Arabic	Arabic (Arabic)	Filasṭīn		.ps	No
xn--wgbl6a	.قطر	Qatar	Arabic	Arabic (Arabic)	Qaṭar		.qa	No
xn--p1ai	.рф	Russia	Russian	Cyrillic (Russian)	rf		.ru	Yes
xn--mgberp4a5d4ar	.السعودية	Saudi Arabia	Arabic	Arabic (Arabic)	as-Suʿūdīya		.sa	Yes
xn--90a3ac	.срб	Serbia	Serbian	Cyrillic (Serbian)	srb		.rs	Yes
xn--yfro4i67o	.新加坡	Singapore	Chinese	Chinese (Simplified and Traditional)	Xīnjiāpō		.sg	Yes
xn--clchc0ea0b2g2a9gcd	.சிங்கப்பூர்	Singapore	Tamil	Tamil	Cinkappūr		.sg	Yes
xn--3e0b707e	.한국	South Korea	Korean	Hangul	Han-guk		.kr	Yes
xn--fzc2c9e2c	.ලංකා	Sri Lanka	Sinhala	Sinhala	Lanka		.lk	No
xn--xkc2al3hye2a	.இலங்கை	Sri Lanka	Tamil	Tamil	Ilaṅkai		.lk	No
xn--mgbpl2fh	.سودان	Sudan	Arabic	Arabic (Arabic)	Sūdān		.sd	No
xn--ogbpf8fl	.سورية	Syria	Arabic	Arabic (Arabic)	Sūriyya		.sy	No
xn--kprw13d	.台湾	Taiwan	Chinese	Chinese (Simplified)	Táiwān		.tw	Yes
xn--kpry57d	.台灣	Taiwan	Chinese	Chinese (Traditional)	Táiwān		.tw	Yes
xn--o3cw4h	.ไทย	Thailand	Thai	Thai	Thai		.th	Yes
xn--pgbs0dh	.تونس	Tunisia	Arabic	Arabic (Arabic)	Tūnis		.tn	Yes
xn--j1amh	.укр	Ukraine	Ukrainian	Cyrillic (Ukrainian)	ukr		.ua	No
xn--mgbaam7a8h	.امارات	UAE	Arabic	Arabic (Arabic)	Imārāt		.ae	No
xn--mgb2ddes	.اليمن	Yemen	Arabic	Arabic (Arabic)	al-Yaman	Not delegated	.ye	No

Table notes

=== Proposed internationalized ccTLDs ===
Internationalised domain names have been proposed for Japan and Libya.

== Relation to ISO 3166-1 ==
The IANA is not in the business of deciding what is and what is not a country. The selection of the ISO 3166 list as a basis for country code top-level domain names was made with the knowledge that ISO has a procedure for determining which entities should be and should not be on that list.

— Jon Postel, RFC 1591

=== Unused ISO 3166-1 codes ===
Almost all current ISO 3166-1 codes have been assigned and do exist in DNS. However, some of these are effectively unused. In particular, the ccTLDs for the Norwegian dependency Bouvet Island (bv) and the designation Svalbard and Jan Mayen (sj) do exist in DNS, but no subdomains have been assigned, and it is Norid policy to not assign any at present. Two French territories—bl (Saint Barthélemy) and mf (Saint Martin)—still await local assignment by France's government.

The code eh, although eligible as ccTLD for Western Sahara, has never been assigned and does not exist in DNS. Only one subdomain is still registered in gb (ISO 3166-1 for the United Kingdom), and no new registrations are being accepted for it. Sites in the United Kingdom generally use uk (see below).

The former .um ccTLD for the U.S. Minor Outlying Islands was removed in April 2008. Under RFC 1591 rules, .um is eligible as a ccTLD on request by the relevant governmental agency and local Internet user community.

=== ASCII ccTLDs not in ISO 3166-1 ===
Several ASCII ccTLDs are in use that are not ISO 3166-1 two-letter codes. Some of these codes were specified in older versions of the ISO list.

- uk (United Kingdom): The ISO 3166-1 code for the United Kingdom is GB. However, the JANET network had already selected uk as a top-level identifier for its pre-existing Name Registration Scheme, and this was incorporated into the DNS root. gb was assigned with the intention of a transition, but this never occurred and the use of uk is now entrenched.
- su This obsolete ISO 3166 code for the Soviet Union was assigned when the Soviet Union still existed; moreover, new su registrations are accepted.
- ac (Ascension Island): This code is a vestige of IANA's decision in 1996 to allow the use of codes reserved in the ISO 3166-1 alpha-2 reserve list for use by the Universal Postal Union. The decision was later reversed, with Ascension Island now the sole outlier. (Three other ccTLDs, gg (Guernsey), im (Isle of Man) and je (Jersey) also fell under this category from 1996 until they received corresponding ISO 3166 codes in March 2006.)
- eu (European Union): On September 25, 2000, ICANN decided to allow the use of any two-letter code in the ISO 3166-1 reserve list that is reserved for all purposes. Only EU currently meets this criterion. Following a decision by the EU's Council of Telecommunications Ministers in March 2002, progress was slow, but a registry (named EURid) was chosen by the European Commission, and criteria for allocation set: ICANN approved eu as a ccTLD, and it opened for registration on 7 December 2005 for the holders of prior rights. Since 7 April 2006, registration is open to all in the European Economic Area.

=== Historical ccTLDs ===
ccTLDs may be removed if that country ceases to exist. There are three ccTLDs that have been deleted after the corresponding 2-letter code was withdrawn from ISO 3166-1: cs (for Czechoslovakia), zr (for Zaire) and tp (for East Timor). There may be a significant delay between withdrawal from ISO 3166-1 and deletion from the DNS; for example, ZR ceased to be an ISO 3166-1 code in 1997, but the zr ccTLD was not deleted until 2001. Other ccTLDs corresponding to obsolete ISO 3166-1 codes have not yet been deleted. In some cases they may never be deleted due to the amount of disruption this would cause for a heavily used ccTLD. In particular, the Soviet Union's ccTLD su remains in use more than twenty years after SU was removed from ISO 3166-1.

The historical country codes .dd for the German Democratic Republic and yd for South Yemen were eligible for a ccTLD, but not allocated; see also .de and ye.

The temporary reassignment of country code cs (Serbia and Montenegro) until its split into rs and me (Serbia and Montenegro, respectively) led to some controversies about the stability of ISO 3166-1 country codes, resulting in a second edition of ISO 3166-1 in 2007 with a guarantee that retired codes will not be reassigned for at least 50 years, and the replacement of RFC 3066 by RFC 4646 for country codes used in language tags in 2006.

The previous ISO 3166-1 code for Yugoslavia, YU, was removed by ISO on 23 July 2003, but the yu ccTLD remained in operation. Finally, after a two-year transition to Serbian rs and Montenegrin me, the .yu domain was phased out in March 2010.

Australia was originally assigned the oz country code, which was later changed to au with the .oz domains moved to .oz.au.

== Internationalized ccTLDs ==
An internationalized country code top-level domain (IDN ccTLD) is a top-level domain with a specially encoded domain name that is displayed in an end user application, such as a web browser, in its native language script or a non-alphabetic writing system, such as Latin script (.us, .uk and .br), Indic script (.भारत) and Korean script (.한국), etc. IDN ccTLDs are an application of the internationalized domain name (IDN) system to top-level Internet domains assigned to countries, including the United Kingdom, or independent geographic regions.

ICANN started to accept applications for IDN ccTLDs in November 2009, and installed the first set into the Domain Names System in May 2010. The first set was a group of Arabic names for the countries of Egypt, Saudi Arabia, and the United Arab Emirates. By May 2010, 21 countries had submitted applications to ICANN, representing 11 languages.

ICANN requires all potential international TLDs to use at least one letter that does not resemble a Latin letter, or have at least three letters, in an effort to avoid IDN homograph attacks. Nor shall the international domain name look like another domain name, even if they have different alphabets. Between Cyrillic and Greek alphabets, for example, this could happen.

== Generic ccTLDs ==
Generic Country Code Top-Level Domain or gccTLD refers to those TLDs which are technically "non-restricted ccTLDs" but used like traditional generic TLDs (gTLDs) rather than "country"-targeted ones. Most of the gccTLDs are primarily used as domain hacks:

gccTLD	Country/Region	Domain hacks
.ac	Ascension Island	academic; accounting; acknowledge; Air conditioning; alternating-current
.ad	Andorra	advertising
.ag	Antigua and Barbuda	Aktiengesellschaft (German type of corporation)
.ai	Anguilla	Artificial intelligence
.am	Armenia	AM broadcasting
.as	American Samoa	Asturias; autonomous system; aktieselskab/aksjeselskap
.az	Azerbaijan	Arizona
.bz	Belize	Bolzano; business; biz alike
.cc	Cocos (Keeling) Islands	cricket club; Credit Card; Cycling club; Christian Church; Catholic Church; Creative Commons; Cape Cod; company; com alike
.cd	Congo	Compact disc
.co	Colombia	company; com alike; Colorado
.cu	Cuba	see you
.cv	Cape Verde	curriculum vitae
.dj	Djibouti	Disc jockey
.fm	Federated States of Micronesia	FM broadcasting; radio and podcasts
.ga	Gabon	Georgia
.gg	Bailiwick of Guernsey	Good Game; Google
.hr	Croatia	Human resources
.io	British Indian Ocean Territory	Input/Output; info alike
.is	Iceland	it.is, that.is, etc.
.it	Italy	Information technology
.kg	Kyrgyzstan	Keygen
.la	Laos	Los Angeles; Louisiana; Mozilla; Tesla; Digikala; Latin America
.ly	Libya	words ending in -ly
.md	Moldova	Medicine; Markdown
.me	Montenegro	me (personal homepage); Maine; Middle East
.ms	Montserrat	Microsoft; Mississippi; Mato Grosso do Sul; Münster; master
.mv	Maldives	music video
.nu	Niue	new; now; nude
.pe	Peru	Private Equity
.pn	Pitcairn	Phone number
.ps	Palestine	PostScript; Photoshop; PlayStation
.pw	Palau	Pwned (leet speak)
.re	Réunion	Reverse engineering
.rs	Serbia	Rust; Rio Grande do Sul
.sc	Seychelles	Santa Catarina; South Carolina; SoundCloud; Snapchat; Security
.sh	Saint Helena	Shell
.sk	Slovakia	Saskatchewan
.sx	Sint Maarten	sex
.tf	French Southern and Antarctic Lands	Team Fortress; Terraform
.tk	Tokelau	tech; Hi-tech
.tm	Turkmenistan	Trademark
.to	Tonga	link-to
.tv	Tuvalu	television and broadcasts
.ws	Western Samoa	website; websocket; world site; west
.yt	Mayotte	YouTube

== Unconventional usage ==
Lenient registration restrictions on certain ccTLDs have resulted in various domain hacks. Domain names such as I.am, tip.it, start.at and go.to form well-known English phrases, whereas others combine the second-level domain and ccTLD to form one word or one title, creating domains such as blo.gs of South Georgia and the South Sandwich Islands (gs), youtu.be of Belgium (be), del.icio.us of the United States (us), and cr.yp.to of Tonga (to). The .co domain of Colombia has been cited since 2010 as a potential competitor to generic TLDs for commercial use, because it may be an abbreviation for company.

Several ccTLDs allow the creation of emoji domains.

Some ccTLDs may also be used for typosquatting. The domain cm for Cameroon has generated interest due to the possibility that people might miss typing the letter o for sites in the com.

=== Commercial use ===
Some of the world's smallest countries and non-sovereign or colonial entities with their own country codes have opened their TLDs for worldwide commercial use. Some of them, such as .tk, are free.

== See also ==
- List of ccTLDs
- Country code top-level domains with commercial licenses
- Country code second-level domain
- ISO 3166-1 alpha-2 assigned codes
- Geographic top-level domain, a type of generic top-level domain
