= .tv =

Internet domain code for Tuvalu

- Introduced: 1996; 30 years ago
- TLD type: Country code top-level domain
- Status: Active
- Registry: GoDaddy Registry
- Sponsor: Government of Tuvalu
- Intended use: Entities connected with Tuvalu
- Actual use: Marketed commercially for use in television (TV) or video-related sites; can be registered and used for any purpose; little use in Tuvalu
- Registration restrictions: None
- Structure: Direct second-level registrations are allowed; some second-level domains such as gov.tv are reserved for third-level domains representing entities in Tuvalu
- Dispute policies: UDRP
- Registry website: turnon.tv

.tv is the Internet country code top-level domain (ccTLD) for Tuvalu. The domain name is popular, and thus economically valuable, because TV also happens to be an abbreviation of the word television.

In 1998, the government of Tuvalu sought to capitalise on the .tv suffix, later signing with the International Telecommunication Union, Information.CA, Idealab, Verisign, and currently GoDaddy to expand the domain. Except for reserved names like com.tv, net.tv, org.tv and others, anyone may register second-level domains under .tv. By 2019, 8.4% of the revenue of the government of Tuvalu came from .tv royalties, with hundreds of thousands of websites registered under the domain. Google treats .tv as a generic top-level domain (gTLD) because "users and website owners frequently see [the domain] as being more generic than country targeted."

== History ==
=== Background and creation ===
As a small island-nation, Tuvalu used to have a low yearly income, which would eventually change with the local government's creation of the .tv domain.

The domain was implemented and issued in the 1980s, after which the government of Tuvalu cooperated with the International Telecommunication Union to find a marketing partner for the domain. In 1998, the .tv Corporation was established as the exclusive .tv domain registrar under the management of Information.CA of Toronto, which agreed to pay US$50 million upfront to manage and market .tv registrations until 2048.

Following delays in payment, in 1999, the contract was reassigned to the California-based Idealab, which agreed to pay $12.5 million of the $50 million upfront and the remainder in $1 million quarterly payments over a 10-year licensing contract. After a $5 million quarterly payment in January 2000, the company's subsequent poor financial performance resulted in the transfer of $3 million in preferred .tv stock to the government of Tuvalu in exchange for waiving three quarterly payments.

=== Marketing and use ===
Logo of the domain under Verisign

On 31 December 2001, the company was acquired by Verisign for $45 million, including $10 million for Tuvalu's $3 million stake in the company. Quarterly payments were renegotiated from $1 million to $550,000 and extended to last until 2011. On 19 March 2010, Verisign reduced .tv registration fees to encourage widespread adoption of the domain. In 2011, Verisign renewed its contract with the government of Tuvalu to manage .tv registrations through 2021.

In 2014, Amazon acquired Twitch for $1 billion, making it the first .tv website to achieve unicorn status. The government of Tuvalu subsequently renegotiated its contract with Verisign, resulting in an increase in yearly payments to Tuvalu around $5 million, a 1/12th of the nation's annual gross national income (GNI) at the time.

As Verisign opted not to renew its contract, on 14 December 2021, GoDaddy signed a contract with the government of Tuvalu to manage .tv registrations, increasing yearly payments to the government of Tuvalu to $10 million. In 2023, an agreement between the Government of Tuvalu and the GoDaddy Company outsourced the marketing, sales, promotion and branding of the .tv domain to the Tuvalu Telecommunications Corporation, which established a .tv Unit.

== Content stations ==
Websites with the .tv domain often feature video content for specific brands or firms. The domain contains the sites of news services, including Fox News and MSNBC. It also includes streaming services such as Amazon Prime, Netflix, Hulu, YouTube, and Dropout. The domain also contains the website Twitch, and the Eurovision Song Contest.

== .co.tv ==
In July 2011, Google removed .co.tv websites from its search results due to their extensive use by website scammers. This had no impact on other .tv websites. According to Lucian Constantin at Softpedia, "CO.TV is a free domain provider that is obviously being abused by the people behind this campaign. All of the rogue domains used are hosted on the same IP address."

== Impact on Tuvalu's economy ==
In 2019, the island of Tuvalu gained an estimated $5.5 million from the domain, along with other business practices like fishing. Proceedings from .tv domain registrations are used to fund the Tuvaluan government's Future Now Project (Tuvaluan: Te Ataeao Nei), which provides mitigation plans for infrastructure and maritime boundaries affected by climate change, digitisation of cultural heritage and maintenance of the domain and related intellectual property's active status.

== Future ==
Tuvalu's long-term habitability is threatened by climate change, with the island being barely above sea level. In response to the question of what would happen if a nation-state would cease to exist, the ICANN board stated: "If the code element is removed, the ccTLD would be eligible for retirement. Reason for removal is not of relevance." This means that the top-level domain would be dissolved if the country were to disappear, eventually needing to be recreated as a gTLD for television and video media (thus making its actual use official), maintained elsewhere—such as in the United States, like .com, .org, .net, and other generic-use domains.

== See also ==
- .ai
