= .st =

Internet country-code top level domain for São Tomé and Príncipe

- Introduced: 7 November 1997
- TLD type: Country code top-level domain
- Status: Active
- Registry: Bahnhof ST Registry
- Sponsor: Tecnisys
- Intended use: Entities connected with São Tomé and Príncipe
- Actual use: Used in São Tomé and Príncipe, but marketed worldwide for various purposes
- Registration restrictions: None
- Structure: Registrations are made directly at the second level
- Documents: Terms and Conditions
- Dispute policies: The registry obeys court orders, and judges disputes themselves for a fee
- Registry website: .ST registry

.st is the Internet country code top-level domain (ccTLD) for São Tomé and Príncipe. The code is marketed worldwide as an abbreviation for various entities.

== Second-level domains ==
Registrations are taken directly at the second level, but some names have been reserved for use in specialized third-level registrations (though not all of these are actually in use at present):

- nic.st: Official ST domain registry (older: registry.st)
- gov.st: Government of São Tomé and Príncipe
- saotome.st: Island of São Tomé
- principe.st: Island of Príncipe
- consulado.st: São Tomé and Príncipe consulates
- embaixada.st: São Tomé and Príncipe embassies
- org.st: non-profit organisations
- edu.st: educational institutions
- net.st: network providers/operators, ISPs
- com.st: commercial entities
- store.st
- mil.st: Armed Forces of São Tomé and Príncipe
- co.st

== Other uses ==
The .st domain is being marketed as a general-use domain, with a number of meanings suggested, including the abbreviation of "street", "state", short for "Star Trek" and more. The .st domain is also commonly used to create domain names that spell words ending in st, such as toa.st or ho.st. It is used for URL shortening domains like The Washington Post's wapo.st, and PlayStation's play.st.
