= .gp =

Internet country code top-level domain for Guadeloupe

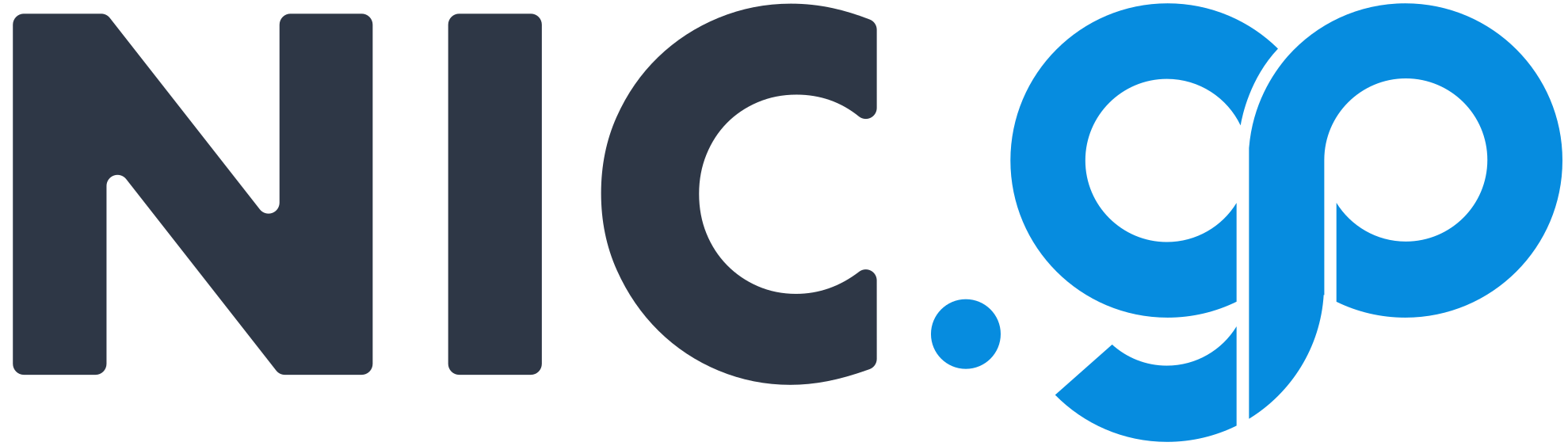
- Introduced: 21 October 1996
- TLD type: Country code top-level domain
- Status: Active
- Registry: Networking Technologies Group
- Sponsor: Networking Technologies Group
- Intended use: Entities connected with Guadeloupe
- Actual use: Not very heavily used
- Registration restrictions: Available worldwide but less expensive for Guadeloupe residents
- Structure: Registrations are directly at second level, or at third level beneath second-level categories
- Documents: Terms of use
- Registry website: nic.gp

.gp is the country code top-level domain (ccTLD) for Guadeloupe. Pricing differs for Guadeloupians compared to other Internet users.

Registrations can be made directly at the second level, or at the third level beneath .com.gp, .net.gp, .edu.gp, .asso.gp, or .org.gp. Two digits numbers are accepted for registration.

NIC.GP has been a member of LACTLD since August 2019.

== See also ==
- Internet in Guadeloupe
- Internet in France
- ISO 3166-2:GP
- .fr –CC TLD for the Republic of France
- .eu –CC TLD for the European Union
