= .ir =

Internet country code top-level domain for Iran

- Introduced: 6 April 1994
- TLD type: Country code top-level domain
- Status: Active
- Registry: Institute for Research in Fundamental Sciences
- Intended use: Entities connected with Iran
- Registered domains: 1,636,568 (2024-7-12)
- Registration restrictions: Generally open for Iranians and non-Iranians; 3rd-level registrations under subdomains have varied restrictions and are restricted to Iranian-related entities
- Structure: May register at second level or at third level beneath generic-category 2nd level domains
- Dispute policies: IRNIC Dispute Resolution Policy
- Registry website: nic.ir

.ir is the Internet country code top-level domain (ccTLD) for Iran. It is managed by the Institute for Research in Fundamental Sciences.

== Pricing ==
Purchasing a domain name is done through the IRNIC website, but reselling is also allowed. As of May 2024, the price of registration is 200,000 IRR (US$4.76).

== List of domains ==
- .ir - Public domain
- .ac.ir - Academic institutions and learned societies.
- .sch.ir - Schools, primary and secondary education
- .co.ir - Commercial purpose
- .gov.ir - Iran government
- .id.ir - Personal, one per unique national identity number
- .net.ir - Service providers and companies approved by the CRA
- .org.ir - Non-profit organisations

=== Persian domains ===
Persian internationalized domain names are available for registration under .ایران .ir for public, in the Persian script.

In 2010, ICANN approved the domain ایران. (the Persian spelling of "Iran") after it passed a review to ensure it was technically safe and correctly represented the country's name. It then became eligible to be added to the internet's official list of country domains.

== Testbeds ==
- .dnssec.ir – limited term testbed for DNSSEC support
