= .je =

Internet country-code top level domain for Jersey

- Introduced: 8 August 1996; 30 years ago
- TLD type: Country code top-level domain
- Status: Active
- Registry: Island Networks
- Sponsor: Island Networks
- Intended use: Entities connected with Jersey
- Actual use: Popular in Jersey
- Registration restrictions: None
- Structure: Registrations are directly at second level or under second level generic categories
- Documents: T&C
- Dispute policies: DRS
- DNSSEC: Yes
- Registry website: Island Networks

.je is the country code top-level domain for Jersey. The domain is administered by Island Networks, who also administer the .gg domain for neighbouring territory Guernsey. In 2003, a Google Search website was made available for Jersey, which uses the .je domain.

== History ==
Alderney hosts the domain name registry for both bailiwicks of the Channel Islands. The country-code top-level domains of .je and .gg first appeared on the Internet in August 1996 after Jon Postel agreed with Nigel Roberts to add four codes (GG and JE, and IM and AC) to the IANA list of TLDs. The codes for the Channel Islands and for the Isle of Man were entered on to the official United Nations ISO-3166 list in 2006.

== Second-level domains ==
Since 2000, names have been registered principally directly under the country code.

However the following legacy sub-domain are still open for registration

- .co.je: commercial/personal domains
- .net.je: Internet service providers and commercial
- .org.je: organisations (free to local good causes)
- .sch.je: schools, primary and secondary education
