= .ai =

Top-level Internet domain for Anguilla

- Introduced: 16 February 1995
- TLD type: Country code top-level domain
- Status: Active
- Registry: Identity Digital
- Sponsor: Government of Anguilla
- Intended use: Entities connected with Anguilla
- Actual use: Some use in Anguilla; very popular with companies and websites related to artificial intelligence (AI).
- Registered domains: 1,277,727 (June 2026)
- Registration restrictions: None
- Structure: Registrations possible at third level, beneath several second-level labels, are available to anybody; second-level registrations are now available to anybody as well (as of 26 June 2006).
- Dispute policies: UDRP
- DNSSEC: Yes
- Registry website: www.nic.ai

.ai is the Internet country code top-level domain (ccTLD) for Anguilla, a British Overseas Territory in the Caribbean. It is administered by the government of Anguilla.

It is a popular domain hack with companies and projects related to the artificial intelligence industry (AI).

In 2021, Google Search analyst Gary Illyes announced that ".ai" had been added to Google’s list of generic country-code top-level domains, meaning that Google would no longer infer Anguilla-specific targeting from the ccTLD. Google's ad targeting treats .ai as a generic top-level domain (gTLD) because "users and website owners frequently see [the domain] as being more generic than country-targeted."

Identity Digital began managing the domain as of January 2025.

== Second and third level registrations ==
Registrations within off.ai, com.ai, net.ai, and org.ai are available worldwide without restriction. From 15 September 2009, second level registrations within .ai are available to everyone worldwide.

== Registration ==
The minimum registration term allowed for .ai domains is 2 through 10 years for registration and renewal, and a 2-year renewal for domain transfer. Identity Digital is the authority in charge of managing this extension. Registrations began on 16 February 1995. The limits on the number of characters used for the domain name are, at a minimum, from 1 to 3, depending on the registrar, and always at most 63 characters. (Note: Examples: OpenSRS: 3–63 characters; GoDaddy: 1–63; EuroDNS: 2–63; TrueHost: 3–63) The character set supported for .ai domain names includes A–Z, a–z, 0–9, and hyphen. As of November 2022, .ai domains cannot accommodate IDN characters. There are no requirements for registering a domain, including local and foreign residents.

A .ai domain can be suspended or revoked, if the domain is involved in illegal activity such as violating trademarks or copyrights. Usage must not violate the laws of Anguilla.

Anguilla uses the UDRP. Filing a UDRP challenge requires using one of the ICANN Approved Dispute Resolution Service Providers. If the domain is with an ICANN accredited registrar, they should work with the arbitrator. Usually this means either doing nothing or transferring a domain. .ai domains are transferable to any desired registrars as the registration of domain is done maintaining EPP.

There used to be a whois.ai-based platform of expired domains in which those could be procured and auctioned every ten days through a standard online process. The last auctions of such kind closed there in December 2024; the platform had been scheduled for shutdown on 30 June 2025, but remained online in the months following that date.

== Valuation ==
Domains cost depends on the registrar, with yearly fees ranging from US$140 (the base fee, as established by Anguilla) to $200. As of July 2025, the highest-valued .ai domain is an undisclosed one sold on 8 November 2023, on Escrow.com, for US$1,500,000—months after an initial $300,000 sale to the same buyer. Among the publicly disclosed ones, the most valued, fin.ai, was sold for $1,000,000 in March 2025.

On 16 December 2017, the .ai registry started supporting the Extensible Provisioning Protocol (EPP) and migrated all of its domains onto an EPP system. Consequently, many registrars are allowed to sell .ai domains. Since that date, the .ai ccTLD has also been popular with artificial intelligence companies and organisations. Though such trends are primarily seen among new AI based companies or startups, many established AI and Tech companies preferred not to opt for .ai domains. For example, DeepMind has its domain retained at .com; Meta has redirected its facebook.ai domain to ai.meta.com.

== Impact on Anguilla's economy ==
The registration fees earned from the .ai domains go to the treasury of the Government of Anguilla. As per a 2018 New York Times report, the total revenue generated out of selling .ai domains was $2.9 million.

In 2023, Anguilla's government made about US$32 million from fees collected for registering .ai domains; that amounted to over 10% of gross domestic product for the territory.

"In the years before the real breakthrough of AI, revenue from .ai domains made up less than 1% of our state income, by 2025 it will be around 47%," explained Jose Vanterpool, Minister of Infrastructure and Communications (MICUHITES), in an interview with BBC.

The high 90% renewal rate of .ai domains and the 2025 renewal wave of domains registered in 2023 are driving another surge in state revenues, according to Domaintechnik.

== See also ==
- .fm – Country-code top level domain of the Federated States of Micronesia
- .tv – Internet domain code for Tuvalu
- AI washing – Deceptive marketing tactic
