= ISO 3166-2:CS =

Former entry for Serbia and Montenegro in ISO 3166-2

ISO 3166-2:CS was the entry for Serbia and Montenegro in ISO 3166-2, part of the ISO 3166 standard published by the International Organization for Standardization (ISO), which defines codes for the names of the principal subdivisions (e.g., provinces or states) of all countries coded in ISO 3166-1.

Serbia and Montenegro was officially assigned the ISO 3166-1 alpha-2 code CS before it was dissolved in 2006, and the entry was deleted from ISO 3166-2 as a result. The two republics, Montenegro (Montenegrin: Crna Gora) and Serbia (Serbian: Srbija), became independent and are now officially assigned the ISO 3166-1 alpha-2 codes ME and RS respectively.

Before 2003, the name of the country was Yugoslavia, and it was officially assigned the ISO 3166-1 alpha-2 code YU.

While the ISO 3166-1 alpha-2 code CS was used to represent Czechoslovakia before it was dissolved in 1993, this predated the first publication of ISO 3166–2 in 1998.

== Changes ==
The following changes to the entry had been announced in newsletters by the ISO 3166/MA since the first publication of ISO 3166–2 in 1998:

Newsletter	Date issued	Description of change in newsletter	Code/Subdivision change
Newsletter I-1	2000-06-21	Update of the source information	
Newsletter I-5	2003-09-05	Change of ISO 3166-1 country code element and country name (in accordance with ISO 3166-1 Newsletter V-8)	Codes: YU- → CS-
Newsletter I-8	2007-04-17	Deletion of a former country (in accordance with ISO 3166-1 Newsletter V-12)	Subdivisions deleted: 2 republics, 2 autonomous provinces (see below)

=== Codes deleted in Newsletter I-8 ===
==== Republics ====
Former code	Subdivision name (sr) (UN III/11 1977)	Subdivision name (sr) (Note: For reference only, Serbian name in Cyrillic script was not included in the ISO 3166-2 standard.)	Subdivision category
CS-CG	Crna Gora	Црна Гора	republic
CS-SR	Srbija	Србија	republic

==== Autonomous provinces ====
Former code	Subdivision name (sr) (UN III/11 1977)	Subdivision name (sr)	Subdivision category	In republic
CS-KM	Kosovo i Metohija	Косово и Метохија	autonomous province	SR
CS-VO	Vojvodina	Војводина	autonomous province	SR

== See also ==
- Country codes of Serbia
- ISO 3166-2:ME (current code for Montenegro)
- ISO 3166-2:RS (current code for Serbia)
- Neighbouring countries: AL, BA, BG, HR, HU, MK, RO
