= Slovenia (disambiguation) =

Slovenia is a country in southeastern Europe.

Slovenia may also refer to:

== Places ==
- Slovenia (European Parliament constituency), covering Slovenia
- Socialist Republic of Slovenia, a federal unit of former Yugoslavia
- Eastern Slovenia, one of the two statistical regions of Slovenia
- Western Slovenia, the other of two statistical regions of Slovenia
- Friulian Slovenia, a region in Italy and Slovenia

== Other uses ==
- United Slovenia, projected (1848) political entity

== See also ==
- Slovenians (disambiguation)
- Slovene (disambiguation)
- Slavonia (disambiguation)
- Slavia (disambiguation)
