= ISO 3166-2:SI =

Entry for Slovenia in ISO 3166-2

ISO 3166-2:SI is the entry for Slovenia in ISO 3166-2, part of the ISO 3166 standard published by the International Organization for Standardization (ISO), which defines codes for the names of the principal subdivisions (e.g., provinces or states) of all countries coded in ISO 3166-1.

Currently for Slovenia, ISO 3166-2 codes are defined for 200 municipalities and 12 urban municipalities.

Each code consists of two parts, separated by a hyphen. The first part is SI, the ISO 3166-1 alpha-2 code of Slovenia. The second part is three digits, which is the municipality code used by the Statistical Office of the Republic of Slovenia:

- 001–147 (except 145): communes as from 1995 to 1998
- 148–193: communes created in 1998
- 194: municipality created in 2002
- 195–206: communes created in March 2006
- 207–211: communes created in June 2006
- 212–213: communes created in 2011

The codes for all groups of communes are assigned in Slovenian alphabetical order, except Tišina and Šalovci (whose codes are assigned based on their former names, Cankova-Tišina and Hodoš Šalovci respectively) as well as Rogašovci (of which the former spelling was Rogačovci). Žalec, whose municipality code was 145, uses 190 after splitting into multiple municipalities in 1998. Ankaran was added in 2016.

== Current codes ==
Subdivision names are listed as in the ISO 3166-2 standard published by the ISO 3166 Maintenance Agency (ISO 3166/MA).

Subdivision names are sorted in Slovenian alphabetical order: a-c, č, d-s, š, t-z, ž.

Click on the button in the header to sort each column.

Code	Subdivision name (sl)	Local variant	Subdivision category
SI-001	Ajdovščina		municipality
SI-213	Ankaran	Ancarano	municipality
SI-195	Apače		municipality
SI-002	Beltinci		municipality
SI-148	Benedikt		municipality
SI-149	Bistrica ob Sotli		municipality
SI-003	Bled		municipality
SI-150	Bloke		municipality
SI-004	Bohinj		municipality
SI-005	Borovnica		municipality
SI-006	Bovec		municipality
SI-151	Braslovče		municipality
SI-007	Brda		municipality
SI-008	Brezovica		municipality
SI-009	Brežice		municipality
SI-152	Cankova		municipality
SI-011	Celje		urban municipality
SI-012	Cerklje na Gorenjskem		municipality
SI-013	Cerknica		municipality
SI-014	Cerkno		municipality
SI-153	Cerkvenjak		municipality
SI-196	Cirkulane		municipality
SI-015	Črenšovci		municipality
SI-016	Črna na Koroškem		municipality
SI-017	Črnomelj		municipality
SI-018	Destrnik		municipality
SI-019	Divača		municipality
SI-154	Dobje		municipality
SI-020	Dobrepolje		municipality
SI-155	Dobrna		municipality
SI-021	Dobrova-Polhov Gradec		municipality
SI-156	Dobrovnik	Dobronak	municipality
SI-022	Dol pri Ljubljani		municipality
SI-157	Dolenjske Toplice		municipality
SI-023	Domžale		municipality
SI-024	Dornava		municipality
SI-025	Dravograd		municipality
SI-026	Duplek		municipality
SI-027	Gorenja vas-Poljane		municipality
SI-028	Gorišnica		municipality
SI-207	Gorje		municipality
SI-029	Gornja Radgona		municipality
SI-030	Gornji Grad		municipality
SI-031	Gornji Petrovci		municipality
SI-158	Grad		municipality
SI-032	Grosuplje		municipality
SI-159	Hajdina		municipality
SI-160	Hoče-Slivnica		municipality
SI-161	Hodoš	Hodos	municipality
SI-162	Horjul		municipality
SI-034	Hrastnik		municipality
SI-035	Hrpelje-Kozina		municipality
SI-036	Idrija		municipality
SI-037	Ig		municipality
SI-038	Ilirska Bistrica		municipality
SI-039	Ivančna Gorica		municipality
SI-040	Izola	Isola	municipality
SI-041	Jesenice		municipality
SI-163	Jezersko		municipality
SI-042	Juršinci		municipality
SI-043	Kamnik		municipality
SI-044	Kanal ob Soči		municipality
SI-045	Kidričevo		municipality
SI-046	Kobarid		municipality
SI-047	Kobilje		municipality
SI-048	Kočevje		municipality
SI-049	Komen		municipality
SI-164	Komenda		municipality
SI-050	Koper	Capodistria	urban municipality
SI-197	Kostanjevica na Krki		municipality
SI-165	Kostel		municipality
SI-051	Kozje		municipality
SI-052	Kranj		urban municipality
SI-053	Kranjska Gora		municipality
SI-166	Križevci		municipality
SI-054	Krško		urban municipality
SI-055	Kungota		municipality
SI-056	Kuzma		municipality
SI-057	Laško		municipality
SI-058	Lenart		municipality
SI-059	Lendava	Lendva	municipality
SI-060	Litija		municipality
SI-061	Ljubljana		urban municipality
SI-062	Ljubno		municipality
SI-063	Ljutomer		municipality
SI-208	Log-Dragomer		municipality
SI-064	Logatec		municipality
SI-065	Loška dolina		municipality
SI-066	Loški Potok		municipality
SI-167	Lovrenc na Pohorju		municipality
SI-067	Luče		municipality
SI-068	Lukovica		municipality
SI-069	Majšperk		municipality
SI-198	Makole		municipality
SI-070	Maribor		urban municipality
SI-168	Markovci		municipality
SI-071	Medvode		municipality
SI-072	Mengeš		municipality
SI-073	Metlika		municipality
SI-074	Mežica		municipality
SI-169	Miklavž na Dravskem polju		municipality
SI-075	Miren-Kostanjevica		municipality
SI-212	Mirna		municipality
SI-170	Mirna Peč		municipality
SI-076	Mislinja		municipality
SI-199	Mokronog-Trebelno		municipality
SI-077	Moravče		municipality
SI-078	Moravske Toplice		municipality
SI-079	Mozirje		municipality
SI-080	Murska Sobota		urban municipality
SI-081	Muta		municipality
SI-082	Naklo		municipality
SI-083	Nazarje		municipality
SI-084	Nova Gorica		urban municipality
SI-085	Novo Mesto		urban municipality
SI-086	Odranci		municipality
SI-171	Oplotnica		municipality
SI-087	Ormož		municipality
SI-088	Osilnica		municipality
SI-089	Pesnica		municipality
SI-090	Piran	Pirano	municipality
SI-091	Pivka		municipality
SI-092	Podčetrtek		municipality
SI-172	Podlehnik		municipality
SI-093	Podvelka		municipality
SI-200	Poljčane		municipality
SI-173	Polzela		municipality
SI-094	Postojna		municipality
SI-174	Prebold		municipality
SI-095	Preddvor		municipality
SI-175	Prevalje		municipality
SI-096	Ptuj		urban municipality
SI-097	Puconci		municipality
SI-098	Rače-Fram		municipality
SI-099	Radeče		municipality
SI-100	Radenci		municipality
SI-101	Radlje ob Dravi		municipality
SI-102	Radovljica		municipality
SI-103	Ravne na Koroškem		municipality
SI-176	Razkrižje		municipality
SI-209	Rečica ob Savinji		municipality
SI-201	Renče-Vogrsko		municipality
SI-104	Ribnica		municipality
SI-177	Ribnica na Pohorju		municipality
SI-106	Rogaška Slatina		municipality
SI-105	Rogašovci		municipality
SI-107	Rogatec		municipality
SI-108	Ruše		municipality
SI-178	Selnica ob Dravi		municipality
SI-109	Semič		municipality
SI-110	Sevnica		municipality
SI-111	Sežana		municipality
SI-112	Slovenj Gradec		urban municipality
SI-113	Slovenska Bistrica		municipality
SI-114	Slovenske Konjice		municipality
SI-179	Sodražica		municipality
SI-180	Solčava		municipality
SI-202	Središče ob Dravi		municipality
SI-115	Starše		municipality
SI-203	Straža		municipality
SI-181	Sveta Ana		municipality
SI-204	Sveta Trojica v Slovenskih goricah		municipality
SI-182	Sveti Andraž v Slovenskih goricah		municipality
SI-116	Sveti Jurij ob Ščavnici		municipality
SI-210	Sveti Jurij v Slovenskih goricah		municipality
SI-205	Sveti Tomaž		municipality
SI-033	Šalovci		municipality
SI-183	Šempeter-Vrtojba		municipality
SI-117	Šenčur		municipality
SI-118	Šentilj		municipality
SI-119	Šentjernej		municipality
SI-120	Šentjur		municipality
SI-211	Šentrupert		municipality
SI-121	Škocjan		municipality
SI-122	Škofja Loka		municipality
SI-123	Škofljica		municipality
SI-124	Šmarje pri Jelšah		municipality
SI-206	Šmarješke Toplice		municipality
SI-125	Šmartno ob Paki		municipality
SI-194	Šmartno pri Litiji		municipality
SI-126	Šoštanj		municipality
SI-127	Štore		municipality
SI-184	Tabor		municipality
SI-010	Tišina		municipality
SI-128	Tolmin		municipality
SI-129	Trbovlje		municipality
SI-130	Trebnje		municipality
SI-185	Trnovska Vas		municipality
SI-186	Trzin		municipality
SI-131	Tržič		municipality
SI-132	Turnišče		municipality
SI-133	Velenje		urban municipality
SI-187	Velika Polana		municipality
SI-134	Velike Lašče		municipality
SI-188	Veržej		municipality
SI-135	Videm		municipality
SI-136	Vipava		municipality
SI-137	Vitanje		municipality
SI-138	Vodice		municipality
SI-139	Vojnik		municipality
SI-189	Vransko		municipality
SI-140	Vrhnika		municipality
SI-141	Vuzenica		municipality
SI-142	Zagorje ob Savi		municipality
SI-143	Zavrč		municipality
SI-144	Zreče		municipality
SI-190	Žalec		municipality
SI-146	Železniki		municipality
SI-191	Žetale		municipality
SI-147	Žiri		municipality
SI-192	Žirovnica		municipality
SI-193	Žužemberk		municipality

== Changes ==
The following changes to the entry are listed on ISO's online catalogue, the Online Browsing Platform:

Effective date of change	Short description of change (en)
2022-11-29	Change of spelling of SI-044, SI-197; Addition of category urban municipality; Change of category name from municipality to urban municipality for SI-011, SI-050, SI-052, SI-054, SI-061, SI-070, SI-080, SI-084, SI-085, SI-096, SI-112, SI-133; Update List Source
2020-11-24	Correction of spelling for SI-065, SI-116, SI-169, SI-182, SI-204, SI-210; Deletion of asterisk from SI-212; Update List Source
2016-11-15	Change of subdivision category from commune to municipality; addition of municipality SI-213
2010-06-30	Update of the administrative structure and languages and update of the list source
2014-11-03	Add 1 commune SI-212; update List Source

The following changes to the entry have been announced in newsletters by the ISO 3166/MA since the first publication of ISO 3166-2 in 1998. ISO stopped issuing newsletters in 2013.

Newsletter	Date issued	Description of change in newsletter	Code/Subdivision change
Newsletter II-2	2010-06-30	Update of the administrative structure and languages and update of the list source	Subdivisions added: SI-195 Apače; SI-196 Cirkulane; SI-207 Gorje; SI-197 Kostanjevica na Krki; SI-208 Log-Dragomer; SI-198 Makole; SI-199 Mokronog-Trebelno; SI-200 Poljčane; SI-209 Rečica ob Savinji; SI-201 Renče-Vogrsko; SI-202 Središče ob Dravi; SI-203 Straža; SI-204 Sveta Trojica v Slovenskih goricah SI-210 Sveti Jurij v Slovenskih goricah SI-205 Sveti Tomaž; SI-211 Šentrupert; SI-206 Šmarješke Toplice
Newsletter I-7	2005-09-13	Addition of official language names for some municipalities	
Newsletter I-4	2002-12-10	Replacement of statistical regions with 193 municipalities	Subdivision layout: 12 statistical regions (see below) → 193 municipalities

=== Codes before Newsletter I-4 ===
Former code	Subdivision name (sl)
SI-07	Dolenjska
SI-09	Gorenjska
SI-11	Goriška
SI-03	Koroška
SI-10	Notranjsko-kraška
SI-12	Obalno-kraška
SI-08	Osrednjeslovenska
SI-02	Podravska
SI-01	Pomurska
SI-04	Savinjska
SI-06	Spodnjeposavska
SI-05	Zasavska

== See also ==
- Subdivisions of Slovenia
- FIPS region codes of Slovenia
- NUTS codes of Slovenia
- Neighbouring countries: AT, HR, HU, IT
