= NUTS statistical regions of Slovenia =

Statistical regions of Slovenia

In the NUTS (Nomenclature of Territorial Units for Statistics) codes of Slovenia (SI), the three levels are:

Level	Subdivisions	#
NUTS 1	—	1
NUTS 2	Macroregions (kohezijske regije)	2
NUTS 3	Statistical regions (statistične regije)	12

== NUTS codes ==
SI0 Slovenia

SI03 Eastern Slovenia (Vzhodna Slovenija)

SI031 Mura Statistical Region (pomurska statistična regija)
SI032 Drava Statistical Region (podravska statistična regija)
SI033 Carinthia Statistical Region (koroška statistična regija)
SI034 Savinja Statistical Region (savinjska statistična regija)
SI035 Central Sava Statistical Region (zasavska statistična regija)
SI036 Lower Sava Statistical Region (spodnjeposavska statistična regija)
SI037 Southeast Slovenia Statistical Region (jugovzhodna Slovenija)
SI038 Littoral–Inner Carniola Statistical Region (primorsko-notranjska statistična regija)

SI04 Western Slovenia (Zahodna Slovenija)

SI041 Central Slovenia Statistical Region (osrednjeslovenska statistična regija)
SI042 Upper Carniola Statistical Region (gorenjska statistična regija)
SI043 Gorizia Statistical Region (goriška statistična regija)
SI044 Coastal–Karst Statistical Region (obalno-kraška statistična regija)

In the 2003 version, the codes were as follows:

SI0 Slovenia

SI00 Slovenia

SI001 Mura Statistical Region (pomurska statistična regija)
SI002 Drava Statistical Region (podravska statistična regija)
SI003 Carinthia Statistical Region (koroška statistična regija)
SI004 Savinja Statistical Region (savinjska statistična regija)
SI005 Central Sava Statistical Region (zasavska statistična regija)
SI006 Lower Sava Statistical Region (spodnjeposavska statistična regija)
SI009 Upper Carniola Statistical Region (gorenjska statistična regija)
SI00A Inner Carniola–Karst Statistical Region (notranjsko-kraška statistična regija)
SI00B Gorizia Statistical Region (goriška statistična regija)
SI00C Coastal–Karst Statistical Region (obalno-kraška statistična regija)
SI00D Southeast Slovenia Statistical Region (jugovzhodna Slovenija)
SI00E Central Slovenia Statistical Region (osrednjeslovenska statistična regija)

== Local administrative units ==
Below the NUTS levels, the two LAU (Local Administrative Units) levels are:

Level	Subdivisions	#
LAU 1	Administrative units (upravne enote)	58
LAU 2	Municipalities (občine)	210

The LAU codes of Slovenia can be downloaded here:

== See also ==
- Subdivisions of Slovenia
- ISO 3166-2 codes of Slovenia
- FIPS region codes of Slovenia

== Sources ==
- Hierarchical list of the Nomenclature of territorial units for statistics - NUTS and the Statistical regions of Europe
- Overview map of EU Countries - NUTS level 1
  - SLOVENIJA - NUTS level 2
  - SLOVENIJA - NUTS level 3
- Correspondence between the NUTS levels and the national administrative units
- List of current NUTS codes
  - Download current NUTS codes (ODS format)
- Regions of Slovenia, Statoids.com
- Eurostat, Regions in the European Union, Nomenclature of territorial units for statistics NUTS 2013/EU-28, ISSN 2363-197X
