= Spodnji Porčič =

- Location in Slovenia
- Coordinates: 46°35′15.63″N 15°50′59.77″E
- Country: Slovenia
- Traditional region: Styria
- Statistical region: Drava
- Municipality: Lenart

Area
  - Total: 2.11 km^{2} (0.81 sq mi)
- Elevation: 271.8 m (892 ft)

Population (2002)
  - Total: 126

Spodnji Porčič (pronounced [ˈspoːdnji ˈpoːɾtʃitʃ]) is a settlement in the Slovene Hills (Slovene: Slovenske gorice) in the Municipality of Lenart in northeastern Slovenia. The southern part of the settlement is part of the Lenart industrial zone. The area is part of the traditional region of Styria. It is now included in the Drava Statistical Region.

== Name ==
The name Spodnji Porčič literally means 'lower Porčič', differentiating the settlement from neighboring Zgornji Porčič (literally, 'upper Porčič') and Stari Porčič (literally, 'old Porčič', a hamlet of Zgornji Porčič). The name Porčič was first attested in written sources in 1338 as Purchstal (and as Purkstal in 1419, Purckstall and Purgstal in 1445, and Purgstoll and Burgstall in 1763–87). The name is believed to derive from Middle High German burcstal (cf. modern German Burgstall), meaning '(elevated) fortification'. This may refer to a manor owned by the Stubenberg noble family that formerly stood in Spodnji Porčič, or to prehistoric fortifications. The Slovenian name Porčič may be derived from the German name as a diminutized hypocorism (Purg- > *Porgec > *Porgčič > Porčič).

== Cultural heritage ==
An Eneolithic settlement has been identified near the settlement. It has yet to be investigated further and its extent has not been determined. It is a relatively rare site from this period in Slovenia and the archaeological level is relatively undisturbed.

== Notable people ==
Notable people that were born or lived in Spodnji Porčič include:

- Leopold Perko (1848–1918), sculptor and woodcarver
