= Ranked list of Hungarian counties =

Counties of Hungary

The following article is a ranked list of Hungarian counties.

== By area ==
County areas within Hungary
1. Borsod-Abaúj-Zemplén (7.79%)
2. Heves (3.91%)
3. Nógrád (2.74%)
4. Hajdú-Bihar (6.68%)
5. Jász-Nagykun-Szolnok (6%)
6. Szabolcs-Szatmár-Bereg (6.38%)
7. Bács-Kiskun (9.08%)
8. Békés (6.05%)
9. Csongrád (4.58%)
10. Budapest (0.56%)
11. Pest (6.87%)
12. Fejér (4.69%)
13. Komárom-Esztergom (2.43%)
14. Veszprém (4.8%)
15. Győr-Moson-Sopron (4.52%)
16. Vas (3.59%)
17. Zala (4.07%)
18. Baranya (4.76%)
19. Somogy (6.52%)
20. Tolna (3.98%)

The following table presents a listing of Hungarian 19 counties ranked in order of their surface area.

Rank	County	Area (km^{2})	% of total
1	Bács-Kiskun	8,444.90	9.08
2	Borsod-Abaúj-Zemplén	7,247.21	7.79
3	Pest	6,391.13	6.87
4	Hajdú-Bihar	6,210.45	6.68
5	Somogy	6,065.49	6.52
6	Szabolcs-Szatmár-Bereg	5,936.15	6.38
7	Békés	5,629.71	6.05
8	Jász-Nagykun-Szolnok	5,581.63	6.00
9	Veszprém	4,463.64	4.80
10	Baranya	4,429.60	4.76
11	Fejér	4,358.48	4.69
12	Csongrád	4,262.80	4.58
13	Győr-Moson-Sopron	4,207.86	4.52
14	Zala	3,783.84	4.07
15	Tolna	3,703.23	3.98
16	Heves	3,637.17	3.91
17	Vas	3,336.11	3.59
18	Nógrád	2,544.48	2.74
19	Komárom-Esztergom	2,264.36	2.43
(Note: Budapest is not a county, but a municipality that has an identical administrative status to all the other 19 counties.)	Budapest	525.14	0.56
Hungary		93,023.38	100.00

== Population ==
=== By population ===
**County list by population within Hungary** (1/2)
County	Population (2018 est.)
Budapest (capital city)	1,749,734(17.93%)
Pest	1,261,864(13%)
Borsod-Abaúj-Zemplén	648,216(6.64%)
Szabolcs-Szatmár-Bereg	558,361(5.72%)
Hajdú-Bihar	530,463(5.44%)
Bács-Kiskun	505,602(5.18%)
Győr-Moson-Sopron	461,581(4.73%)
Fejér	416,691(4.27%)
Csongrád	400,238(4.10%)
Jász-Nagykun-Szolnok	371,271(3.81%)

**County list by population within Hungary** (2/2)
County	Population (2018 est.)
Baranya	363,721(3.73%)
Veszprém	341,425(3.46%)
Békés	338,025(3.50%)
Somogy	303,802(3.11%)
Komárom-Esztergom	297,454(3.03%)
Heves	295,792(3.05%)
Zala	270,634(2.77%)
Vas	253,305(2.60%)
Tolna	219,317(2.25%)
Nógrád	190,937(1.96%)

The following table presents a listing of Hungarian 19 counties ranked in order of their total population (based on 2011 census). The data is taken from the Hungarian Central Statistical Office (KSH) censuses results, as well as from the Gazetteer of Hungary.

Rank in 2011	County	Population					
Rank in 2011	County	1949	1960	1980	1990	2001	2011
	Budapest	1,590,316	1,804,606	**2,059,347**	2,016,774	1,777,921	1,729,040 ▼
1	Pest	686,953	781,501	973,830	949,842	1,083,877	**1,217,476** ▲
2	Borsod-Abaúj-Zemplén	630,621	725,303	**809,468**	761,963	744,404	686,266 ▼
3	Szabolcs-Szatmár-Bereg	558,098	586,451	**593,829**	572,301	582,256	559,272 ▼
4	Hajdú-Bihar	498,271	522,787	551,448	548,728	**552,998**	546,721 ▼
5	Bács-Kiskun	**591,482**	589,744	571,448	546,898	546,517	520,331 ▼
6	Győr-Moson-Sopron	374,987	401,861	437,857	432,126	438,773	**447,985** ▲
7	Fejér	295,750	357,897	420,317	418,852	**434,317**	425,847 ▼
8	Csongrád	429,083	434,046	**456,300**	438,842	433,344	417,456 ▼
9	Jász-Nagykun-Szolnok	449,551	**461,307**	445,624	425,583	415,917	386,594 ▼
10	Baranya	356,533	395,342	**432,617**	417,400	407,448	386,441 ▼
11	Békés	471,561	467,861	436,910	411,887	397,791	359,948 ▼
12	Veszprém	294,289	337,836	**377,746**	374,466	369,727	353,068 ▼
13	Somogy	361,213	**368,183**	360,270	344,708	335,237	316,137 ▼
14	Heves	316,273	347,856	**350,360**	334,408	325,727	308,882 ▼
15	Komárom-Esztergom	220,914	270,810	**322,893**	316,984	316,590	304,568 ▼
16	Zala	305,433	317,145	**317,298**	306,398	297,404	282,179 ▼
17	Vas	283,070	282,728	285,498	275,944	268,123	256,629 ▼
18	Tolna	275,644	272,101	266,273	253,675	249,683	230,361 ▼
19	Nógrád	214,757	235,675	**240,251**	227,137	220,261	202,427 ▼
**Hungary**		9,204,799	9,961,044	**10,709,463**	10,374,823	10,200,298	9,937,628 ▼

Bold: record number of the population

=== By population density ===
The following table presents a listing of Hungarian 19 counties ranked in order of their population density (based on 2011 census).

Rank	County	Population	Area (km^{2})	Density (pop./km^{2})
	Budapest	1,729,040	525.14	3293
1	Pest	1,217,476	6,391.13	190
2	Komárom-Esztergom	304,568	2,264.36	135
3	Győr-Moson-Sopron	447,985	4,207.86	106
4	Fejér	425,847	4,358.48	98
4	Csongrád	417,456	4,262.80	98
6	Borsod-Abaúj-Zemplén	686,266	7,247.21	95
7	Szabolcs-Szatmár-Bereg	559,272	5,936.15	94
8	Hajdú-Bihar	546,721	6,210.45	88
9	Baranya	386,441	4,429.60	87
10	Heves	308,882	3,637.17	85
11	Nógrád	202,427	2,544.48	80
12	Veszprém	353,068	4,463.64	79
13	Vas	256,629	3,336.11	77
14	Zala	282,179	3,783.84	75
15	Jász-Nagykun-Szolnok	386,594	5,581.63	69
16	Békés	359,948	5,629.71	64
17	Bács-Kiskun	520,331	8,444.90	62
17	Tolna	230,361	3,703.23	62
19	Somogy	316,137	6,065.49	52
**Hungary**		9,937,628	93,023.38	107

=== By urban and rural population ===
Hungarian counties by their urban and rural population as of 2015.

County	Urban	Rural	% Urban	% Rural
Baranya	243,528	130,456	65.1	34.9
Bács-Kiskun	351,187	165,705	67.9	32.1
Békés	272,184	83,015	76.6	23.4
Borsod-Abaúj-Zemplén	396,686	278,313	58.8	41.2
Budapest	1,744,665	–	100.0	0.0
Csongrád	305,622	101,767	75.0	25.0
Fejér	254,922	164,584	60.8	39.2
Győr-Moson-Sopron	270,429	179,889	60.1	39.9
Hajdú-Bihar	430,963	108,544	79.9	20.1
Heves	144,373	159,130	47.6	52.4
Jász-Nagykun-Szolnok	281,089	102,400	73.3	26.7
Komárom-Esztergom	201,802	98,875	67.1	32.9
Nógrád	83,124	115,268	41.9	58.1
Pest	846,329	374,419	69.3	30.7
Somogy	163,995	151,517	52.0	48.0
Szabolcs-Szatmár-Bereg	305,397	255,982	54.4	45.6
Tolna	128,036	99,924	56.2	43.8
Vas	156,316	98,264	61.4	38.6
Veszprém	215,374	133,633	61.7	38.3
Zala	158,094	121,529	56.5	43.5
**Hungary**	6,954,115	2,923,250	70.4	29.6

== Health ==
=== By life expectancy ===
Hungarian counties by life expectancy at birth, by sex, in 2017.

Region	Men (years)	Women (years)
Baranya	72.84	78.56
Bács-Kiskun	71.37	78.93
Békés	71.34	77.78
Budapest	74.27	80.06
Borsod-Abaúj-Zemplén	70.05	77.58
Csongrád	72.91	79.04
Fejér	72.00	78.89
Győr-Moson-Sopron	73.29	79.89
Hajdú-Bihar	72.90	79.80
Heves	71.82	78.46
Jász-Nagykun-Szolnok	71.15	77.89
Komárom-Esztergom	71.71	78.32
Nógrád	69.99	78.80
Pest	73.03	78.69
Somogy	71.74	78.67
Szabolcs-Szatmár-Bereg	71.37	78.11
Tolna	72.26	78.98
Vas	71.40	79.76
Veszprém	72.85	79.45
Zala	72.99	79.96
Hungary	72.40	78.99

Source: "6.1.7. Születéskor várható átlagos élettartam (2001–)," National Statistics Office.

=== By median age ===
Hungarian counties by median age, by sex, in 2018.

Region	Men (years)	Women (years)
Baranya	41.2	45.4
Bács-Kiskun	40.8	45.2
Békés	42.2	46.5
Budapest	40.7	45.1
Borsod-Abaúj-Zemplén	39.2	43.9
Csongrád	41.0	45.2
Fejér	40.4	44.4
Győr-Moson-Sopron	39.9	43.5
Hajdú-Bihar	39.5	43.6
Heves	40.8	45.6
Jász-Nagykun-Szolnok	40.7	44.9
Komárom-Esztergom	40.1	44.3
Nógrád	41.2	45.9
Pest	38.9	42.6
Somogy	41.8	45.9
Szabolcs-Szatmár-Bereg	38.4	42.5
Tolna	41.5	45.9
Vas	41.5	45.4
Veszprém	41.4	45.3
Zala	42.6	47.0
Hungary	40.3	44.5

Source: "6.1.7. Átlagéletkor (2001–)," National Statistics Office.

=== Number of hospital beds ===
Hungarian counties by number of hospital beds, in 2017.

County	Number of beds			Number of beds per 10,000 inhabitants		
County	2000	2010	2017	2000	2010	2017
Baranya	3,741	3,177	2,915 ▼	91.7	81.2	80.1 ▼
Bács-Kiskun	3,800	3,010	2,879 ▼	69.3	57.4	56.9 ▼
Békés	2,839	2,479	2,429 ▼	70.6	68.5	71.9 ▲
Budapest	23,659	18,580	17,905 ▼	134.5	107.2	102.3 ▼
Borsod-Abaúj-Zemplén	5,505	5,151	4,693 ▼	73.1	75.2	72.4 ▼
Csongrád	3,586	3,014	2,999 ▼	83.3	71.5	74.9 ▲
Fejér	2,908	2,579	2,401 ▼	67.9	60.5	57.6 ▼
Győr-Moson-Sopron	3,662	3,202	3,204 ▲	84.4	71.2	69.4 ▼
Hajdú-Bihar	4,292	3,738	3,524 ▼	77.6	69.3	66.4 ▼
Heves	2,614	2,165	2,212 ▲	79.8	70.3	74.8 ▲
Jász-Nagykun-Szolnok	2,930	2,514	2,421 ▼	69.7	65.0	65.2 ▲
Komárom-Esztergom	2,031	1,926	1,833 ▼	64.1	61.8	61.6 ▼
Nógrád	1,533	1,455	1,459 ▲	69.2	72.1	76.4 ▲
Pest	4,227	3,620	3,398 ▼	39.4	29.3	26.9 ▼
Somogy	2,424	2,242	2,015 ▼	71.7	70.5	66.3 ▼
Szabolcs-Szatmár-Bereg	4,077	3,908	3,563 ▼	69.1	70.4	63.8 ▼
Tolna	1,677	1,572	1,525 ▼	66.7	68.0	69.5 ▲
Vas	1,995	1,814	1,874 ▲	74.1	70.4	74.0 ▲
Veszprém	3,208	3,037	3,012 ▼	85.4	85.2	88.2 ▲
Zala	2,721	2,033	2,002 ▼	90.6	70.8	74.0 ▲
Hungary	83,430	71,216	68,263 ▼	81.8	71.3	69.8 ▼

Source: "6.2.3.3. Kórházi ellátás (2000–)*," National Statistics Office.

== Economy ==
Source: Knoema

Name	GDP, million of EUR (2012)	GDP, per capita EUR (2012)	GDP per cap., % of EU average	Unemployment rate (age 15 or over), %
Baranya	2,477	6,500	25	8,3
Bács-Kiskun	3,621	7,000	26	7,4
Békés	2,039	5,600	21	7,5
Borsod-Abaúj-Zemplén	4,215	6,100	23	7,2
Budapest	37,633	21,700	82	4,9
Csongrád	3,059	7,400	28	6,4
Fejér	3,931	9,300	35	3,4
Győr-Moson-Sopron	5,141	11,500	44	3,3
Hajdú-Bihar	3,979	7,300	28	9,3
Heves	2,010	6,500	25	6,0
Jász-Nagykun-Szolnok	2,489	6,400	24	8,0
Komárom-Esztergom	3,059	10,100	38	4,9
Nógrád	880	4,400	16	8,9
Pest	10,062	8,300	31	4,4
Somogy	2,002	6,300	24	8,4
Szabolcs-Szatmár-Bereg	3,050	5,400	20	12,6
Tolna	1,777	7,700	29	7,3
Vas	2,399	9,400	35	3,7
Veszprém	2,484	7,000	27	3,7
Zala	2,393	8,500	32	3,6

=== Agriculture ===
==== By fruitage ====
Hungarian counties by fruitage, by tonnes, in 2016.

Rank	County	All harvested fruits		
Rank	County	2000	2010	2016
1	Szabolcs-Szatmár-Bereg	484,688	331,983	346,471
2	Bács-Kiskun	66,180	94,967	76,206
3	Borsod-Abaúj-Zemplén	55,182	59,298	60,780
4	Pest	105,538	44,424	53,091
5	Hajdú-Bihar	42,625	44,262	49,305
6	Csongrád	25,305	32,168	23,673
7	Zala	38,045	39,774	18,267
8	Heves	13,954	20,971	17,915
9	Somogy	316,137	16,403	17,231
10	Fejér	20,308	13,868	14,035
11	Győr-Moson-Sopron	24,364	9,573	13,583
12	Baranya	12,520	8,109	11,949
	Budapest	23,343	3,846	10,208
13	Tolna	230,361	6,179	9,474
14	Békés	359,948	7,092	8,288
15	Vas	14,429	9,036	7,159
16	Veszprém	27,787	9,742	7,133
17	Jász-Nagykun-Szolnok	386,594	4,745	5,772
18	Nógrád	17,641	5,202	3,574
19	Komárom-Esztergom	7,487	4,133	2,604
Hungary		1,038,139	765,775	755,410

Source: "6.4.1.18. Gyümölcstermelés (2000–)," National Statistics Office.

Rank	County	All harvested fruit harvested			Type of fruits						
Rank	County	2000	2010	2016	Apple	Sour cherry	Plum	Peach	Pear	Armenian plum	Cherry

===== Diagrams =====
Baranya
1. Apple (42%)
2. Plum (15%)
3. Sour cherry (10%)
4. Peach (9%)
5. Armenian plum (7%)
6. Pear (4%)
7. Cherry (3%)
8. Other fruits (10%)

== By number and type of municipalities ==
Hungarian counties by their population living in urban counties (megyei jogú városok), towns (városok), large villages (nagyközségek) and villages (falvak), according to the 2017 Gazetteer of Hungary.

County	Number of				
County	Urban county	Town	Large village	Village	Municipalities
Baranya	1	13	3	284	301
Bács-Kiskun	1	21	9	88	119
Békés	1	21	8	45	75
Borsod-Abaúj-Zemplén	1	28	9	320	358
Csongrád	2	8	8	42	60
Fejér	2	15	12	79	108
Győr-Moson-Sopron	2	10	4	167	183
Hajdú-Bihar	1	20	10	51	82
Heves	1	10	5	105	121
Jász-Nagykun-Szolnok	1	21	4	52	78
Komárom-Esztergom	1	11	2	62	76
Nógrád	1	5	0	125	131
Pest	1	53	24	109	187
Somogy	1	15	2	228	246
Szabolcs-Szatmár-Bereg	1	27	16	185	229
Tolna	1	10	5	93	109
Vas	1	12	0	203	216
Veszprém	1	14	3	199	217
Zala	2	8	3	245	258

== By largest cities ==
Largest cities within a county, according to the 2017 Gazetteer of Hungary (according to the number of inhabitants). In all counties, the largest city is also the county seat, except Pest county where the county seat is Budapest, which does not belong any county but has a unique status (capital city).

County	Largest city	2nd Largest	3rd Largest
Baranya	Pécs	Komló	Mohács
Bács-Kiskun	Kecskemét	**Baja**	Kiskunfélegyháza
Békés	Békéscsaba	Gyula	Orosháza
Borsod-Abaúj-Zemplén	Miskolc	Ózd	Kazincbarcika
Csongrád	Szeged	**Hódmezővásárhely**	Szentes
Fejér	Székesfehérvár	**Dunaújváros**	Mór
Győr-Moson-Sopron	Győr	**Sopron**	Mosonmagyaróvár
Hajdú-Bihar	Debrecen	Hajdúböszörmény	Hajdúszoboszló
Heves	Eger	Gyöngyös	Hatvan
Jász-Nagykun-Szolnok	Szolnok	Jászberény	Törökszentmiklós
Komárom-Esztergom	Tatabánya	**Esztergom**	Tata
Nógrád	Salgótarján	Balassagyarmat	Bátonyterenye
Pest	Érd	Dunakeszi	Szigetszentmiklós
Somogy	Kaposvár	Siófok	Marcali
Szabolcs-Szatmár-Bereg	Nyíregyháza	Mátészalka	Kisvárda
Tolna	Szekszárd	Paks	Dombóvár
Vas	Szombathely	Sárvár	Kőszeg
Veszprém	Veszprém	Pápa	Ajka
Zala	Zalaegerszeg	**Nagykanizsa**	Keszthely
**Hungary**	Budapest	**Debrecen**	**Szeged**

Bold: Cities with county rights

== See also ==
- Regions of Hungary
- Districts of Hungary
- List of cities and towns of Hungary
- Populated places of Hungary
- ISO 3166-2:HU

== Notes and references ==
Notes
