= Spodnje Verjane =

- Location in Slovenia
- Coordinates: 46°33′5.14″N 15°54′25.24″E
- Country: Slovenia
- Traditional region: Styria
- Statistical region: Drava
- Municipality: Sveta Trojica v Slovenskih Goricah

Area
  - Total: 1.11 km^{2} (0.43 sq mi)
- Elevation: 228.2 m (749 ft)

Population (2002)
  - Total: 28

Spodnje Verjane (pronounced [ˈspoːdnjɛ ʋɛˈɾjaːnɛ]) is a small settlement in the Municipality of Sveta Trojica v Slovenskih Goricah in northeastern Slovenia. The area is part of the traditional region of Styria. It is now included with the rest of the municipality in the Drava Statistical Region.

A small roadside chapel in the settlement dates to 1880.
