= Regions of Serbia (disambiguation) =

Regions of Serbia may refer to:

- List of regions of Serbia
- Statistical regions of Serbia
  - NUTS statistical regions of Serbia
