= Administrative divisions of North Macedonia =

The Republic of North Macedonia is currently divided into 8 statistical regions, 80 municipalities and 1783 settlements (34 cities and 1749 villages) as of July 2021.

As the Socialist Republic of Macedonia, a constituent country of the former Socialist Federal Republic of Yugoslavia, North Macedonia was first divided into regions in 1945. Later, the regions were abolished, and North Macedonia was divided into municipalities. Before its independence, North Macedonia was divided into 34 municipalities. After its independence, from 1996 to 2004, the then Republic of Macedonia was divided into 123 municipalities.

== See also ==
- ISO 3166-2:MK, ISO 3166-2 codes of North Macedonia
- List of FIPS region codes (M–O)#MK: North Macedonia, FIPS region codes of North Macedonia (standard withdrawn in 2008)
- NUTS statistical regions of North Macedonia
- Administrative divisions of Yugoslavia
