= XKK =

XKK can mean:

- the ISO-639 code of the Kacoʼ language of Vietnam
- an ISO 3166-1 alpha-3 equivalent user-assigned code element for Kosovo in the Unicode standard, similarly to the shorter XK (user assigned code). XKX is used in the European Union.
