= Zgornje Verjane =

- Location in Slovenia
- Coordinates: 46°34′50.34″N 15°53′11.84″E
- Country: Slovenia
- Traditional region: Styria
- Statistical region: Drava
- Municipality: Sveta Trojica v Slovenskih Goricah

Area
  - Total: 2.72 km^{2} (1.05 sq mi)
- Elevation: 265.3 m (870 ft)

Population (2002)
  - Total: 155

Zgornje Verjane (pronounced [ˈzɡoːɾnjɛ ʋɛˈɾjaːnɛ]) is a settlement in the Municipality of Sveta Trojica v Slovenskih Goricah in the Slovene Hills, northeastern Slovenia. The area is part of the traditional region of Styria and is now included in the Drava Statistical Region.

A small chapel with a belfry in the settlement was built in 1870.
