= Slovenians (disambiguation) =

Slovenians may refer to:

- Slovenians, inhabitants of Slovenia, citizens of Slovenia
- Ethnic Slovenians, variant term for ethnic Slovenes

== See also ==
- Slovenia (disambiguation)
- Slovene (disambiguation)
