= Postal codes in Hungary =

Postal codes in Hungary are four-digit numeric postcodes administered by Magyar Posta, the postal service of Hungary. The current system was introduced on 1 January 1973.

== Structure ==
The first digit of the code is the postal region number, each of which has a major city as its postal centre:

- 1xxx Budapest
- 2xxx Szentendre
- 3xxx Hatvan
- 4xxx Debrecen
- 5xxx Szolnok
- 6xxx Kecskemét
- 7xxx Sárbogárd
- 8xxx Székesfehérvár
- 9xxx Győr

Not all of the above are county capitals: Hatvan, Sárbogárd and Szentendre are major cities, but not county capitals. They are, however, all well communicated cities with big junctions.

In Budapest postal codes are in the format 1XYZ, where X and Y are the two digits of the district number (from 01 to 23) and the last digit is the identification number of the post office in the district (there is more than one in each district).

A special system exists for PO box deliveries, which do not follow the district system. These special postal codes refer to a specific post office rather than an area. The "1000" postal code designates the Countrywide Logistics Centre, which is currently located outside the 1000 region, in Budaörs, which is in the 2000 region.

The rest of the country is structured as follows:

- County capitals are always designated a postcode ending with "00". Some other cities also have postal codes ending "00" without being a county capital.
- Cities generally have postcodes ending with "0".
- Smaller towns and villages have any other number.

Bigger cities were formerly divided into districts, which often lives on in postcodes. This can be confusing, as 3000 designates Hatvan, but 3001 does not designate District 1, but it is actually a PO Box postal code.

=== Postcode search ===
Customers can search the Hungarian Postal Service website for postal codes or download the entire list as a spreadsheet.

== See also ==
- ISO 3166-2:HU
- Counties of Hungary
