= Gočova =

- Location in Slovenia
- Coordinates: 46°32′49.05″N 15°52′7.43″E
- Country: Slovenia
- Traditional region: Styria
- Statistical region: Drava
- Municipality: Sveta Trojica v Slovenskih Goricah

Area
  - Total: 4.2 km^{2} (1.6 sq mi)
- Elevation: 229.4 m (753 ft)

Population (2002)
  - Total: 279

Gočova (pronounced [ˈɡoːtʃɔʋa]) is a settlement in the Municipality of Sveta Trojica v Slovenskih Goricah in northeastern Slovenia. The area is part of the traditional region of Styria and is now included in the Drava Statistical Region.

A number of Roman period burial mounds have been identified and some partly excavated near the settlement.
