= Zgornja Senarska =

- Location in Slovenia
- Coordinates: 46°33′49.83″N 15°52′21.55″E
- Country: Slovenia
- Traditional region: Styria
- Statistical region: Drava
- Municipality: Sveta Trojica v Slovenskih Goricah

Area
  - Total: 2.27 km^{2} (0.88 sq mi)
- Elevation: 233.3 m (765 ft)

Population (2002)
  - Total: 323

Zgornja Senarska (pronounced [ˈzɡoːɾnja sɛˈnaːɾska]) is a settlement in the Municipality of Sveta Trojica v Slovenskih Goricah in northeastern Slovenia. The area is part of the traditional region of Styria and is now included in the Drava Statistical Region.

There are two small chapels in the settlement. One dates to the early 19th century and the other was built in 1922.
