= Osek, Sveta Trojica v Slovenskih Goricah =

Osek
- Location in Slovenia
- Coordinates: 46°35′1.77″N 15°54′21.55″E
- Country: Slovenia
- Traditional region: Styria
- Statistical region: Drava
- Municipality: Sveta Trojica v Slovenskih Goricah

Area
  - Total: 5.96 km^{2} (2.30 sq mi)
- Elevation: 280.1 m (919 ft)

Population (2002)
  - Total: 367

Osek (pronounced [ˈoːsɛk]) is a settlement in the Municipality of Sveta Trojica v Slovenskih Goricah in northeastern Slovenia. The area is part of the traditional region of Styria and is now included in the Drava Statistical Region.

Traces of a Roman period settlement, a quarry, and a burial ground have been identified and partly excavated near the settlement.
