= Spodnja Senarska =

- Location in Slovenia
- Coordinates: 46°33′17.99″N 15°53′16.44″E
- Country: Slovenia
- Traditional region: Styria
- Statistical region: Drava
- Municipality: Sveta Trojica v Slovenskih Goricah

Area
  - Total: 3.26 km^{2} (1.26 sq mi)
- Elevation: 230.7 m (757 ft)

Population (2002)
  - Total: 114

Spodnja Senarska (pronounced [ˈspoːdnja sɛˈnaːɾska]) is a village in the Municipality of Sveta Trojica v Slovenskih Goricah in northeastern Slovenia. It lies on the edge of the Pesnica Valley. The area is part of the traditional region of Styria and is now included in the Drava Statistical Region.

Archaeological evidence points to Roman-era settlement of the area with burial mounds and remains of other contemporary structures.
