= Zgornji Porčič =

- Location in Slovenia
- Coordinates: 46°35′32.89″N 15°51′31.52″E
- Country: Slovenia
- Traditional region: Styria
- Statistical region: Drava
- Municipality: Sveta Trojica v Slovenskih Goricah

Area
  - Total: 5.51 km^{2} (2.13 sq mi)
- Elevation: 335.8 m (1,102 ft)

Population (2002)
  - Total: 463

Zgornji Porčič (pronounced [ˈzɡoːɾnji ˈpoːɾtʃitʃ]) is a settlement in the Municipality of Sveta Trojica v Slovenskih Goricah in northeastern Slovenia. The area is part of the traditional region of Styria. It is now included in the Drava Statistical Region.

== Name ==
The name Zgornji Porčič literally means 'upper Porčič', differentiating the settlement from neighboring Spodnji Porčič (literally, 'lower Porčič') and Stari Porčič (literally, 'old Porčič', a hamlet of Zgornji Porčič). The name Porčič was first attested in written sources in 1338 as Purchstal (and as Purkstal in 1419, Purckstall and Purgstal in 1445, and Purgstoll and Burgstall in 1763–87). The name is believed to derive from Middle High German burcstal (cf. modern German Burgstall), meaning '(elevated) fortification'. This may refer to a manor owned by the Stubenberg noble family that formerly stood in Spodnji Porčič, or to prehistoric fortifications. The Slovenian name Porčič may be derived from the German name as a diminutized hypocorism (Purg- > *Porgec > *Porgčič > Porčič).

== Religious heritage ==
A Neo-Gothic chapel in the village was built in the second half of the 19th century.
