= ISO 3166-2:GR =

Entry for Greece in ISO 3166-2

ISO 3166-2:GR is the entry for Greece in ISO 3166-2, part of the ISO 3166 standard published by the International Organization for Standardization (ISO) which defines codes for the names of the principal subdivisions (e.g., provinces or states) of all countries coded in ISO 3166-1.

Currently for Greece, ISO 3166-2 codes are defined for two categories of subdivisions:

- 13 administrative regions
- one self-governed part

The departments (also called prefectures) were abolished in 2011, and were replaced approximately by regional units. The regional units were deleted from the entry in 2016.

Each code consists of two parts, separated by a hyphen. The first part is GR, the ISO 3166-1 alpha-2 code of Greece. The second part is either of the following:

- one letter (A–M): administrative regions
- two digits: self-governed part

== Current codes ==
Subdivision names are listed as in the ISO 3166-2 standard published by the ISO 3166 Maintenance Agency (ISO 3166/MA).

Click on the button in the header to sort each column.

=== Administrative regions ===
Code	Subdivision name (el) (ELOT 743:1982 = ISO 843:1997 = UN V/19 1987)	Subdivision name (el) (Note: For reference only, Greek name in Greek alphabet not included in the ISO 3166-2 standard.)	Subdivision name (en) (Note: For reference only, English name not included in the ISO 3166-2 standard.)	Subdivision category
GR-69	Ágion Óros	Άγιο Όρος	Mount Athos	self-governed part
GR-A	Anatolikí Makedonía kai Thráki	Ανατολική Μακεδονία και Θράκη	Eastern Macedonia and Thrace	administrative region
GR-I	Attikí	Αττική	Attica	administrative region
GR-G	Dytikí Elláda	Δυτική Ελλάδα	Western Greece	administrative region
GR-C	Dytikí Makedonía	Δυτική Μακεδονία	Western Macedonia	administrative region
GR-F	Ionía Nísia	Ιόνια Νησιά	Ionian Islands	administrative region
GR-D	Ípeiros	Ήπειρος	Epirus	administrative region
GR-B	Kentrikí Makedonía	Κεντρική Μακεδονία	Central Macedonia	administrative region
GR-M	Kríti	Κρήτη	Crete	administrative region
GR-L	Nótio Aigaío	Νότιο Αιγαίο	South Aegean region	administrative region
GR-J	Pelopónnisos	Πελοπόννησος	The Peloponnese	administrative region
GR-H	Stereá Elláda	Στερεά Ελλάδα	Central Greece	administrative region
GR-E	Thessalía	Θεσσαλία	Thessaly	administrative region
GR-K	Vóreio Aigaío	Βόρειο Αιγαίο	North Aegean region	administrative region

== Changes ==
The following changes to the entry have been announced in newsletters by the ISO 3166/MA since the first publication of ISO 3166-2 in 1998:

Newsletter	Date issued	Description of change in newsletter	Code/Subdivision change
Newsletter II-1	2010-02-03 (corrected 2010-02-19)	Addition of the country code prefix as the first code element, reallocation of 3166-2 alpha-2 codes to avoid duplication, addition of names in administrative languages	Codes: format changed (see below)

The following changes to the entry are listed on ISO's online catalogue, the Online Browsing Platform:

Effective date of change	Short description of change (en)
2019-11-22	Grammar correction of GR-J, GR-K, GR-L
2018-11-26	Correction of the romanization system label
2016-11-15	Change of spelling of GR-M; deletion of subdivision category department; deletion of departments GR-01, GR-11, GR-12, GR-31, GR-A1, GR-64, GR-94, GR-85, GR-81, GR-52, GR-71, GR-05, GR-04, GR-63, GR-07, GR-06, GR-51, GR-14, GR-53, GR-33, GR-91, GR-41, GR-56, GR-55, GR-23, GR-22, GR-57, GR-15, GR-58, GR-82, GR-16, GR-42, GR-92, GR-24, GR-83, GR-43, GR-07, GR-59, GR-61, GR-34, GR-93, GR-73, GR-84, GR-62, GR-32, GR-54, GR-44, GR-03, GR-72, GR-21; update list source
2015-11-27	Change of the local short name
2014-10-30	Correct spelling of GR-01, GR-81, GR-23, GR-93, GR-69; correct diacritic marks; update List Source
2010-02-19	Addition of the country code prefix as the first code element, reallocation of 3166-2 alpha-2 codes to avoid duplication, addition of names in administrative languages
2020-03-02	Typographical correction of subdivision name of GR-J

=== Codes changed in Newsletter II-1 ===
Before	After	Subdivision name
GR-I	GR-A	Anatoliki Makedonia kai Thraki
GR-IX	GR-I	Attiki
GR-VII	GR-G	Dytiki Ellada
GR-III	GR-C	Dytiki Makedonia
GR-VI	GR-F	Ionia Nisia
GR-IV	GR-D	Ipeiros
GR-II	GR-B	Kentriki Makedonia
GR-XIII	GR-M	Kriti
GR-XII	GR-L	Notio Aigaio
GR-X	GR-J	Peloponnisos
GR-VIII	GR-H	Sterea Ellada
GR-V	GR-E	Thessalia
GR-XI	GR-K	Voreio Aigaio

=== Codes removed on 15 November 2016 ===
Former code	Subdivision name	Subdivision category	In administrative region
GR-13	Achaḯa	department	G
GR-01	Aitoloakarnanía	department	G
GR-11	Argolída	department	J
GR-12	Arkadía	department	J
GR-31	Árta	department	D
GR-A1	Attikí	department	I
GR-64	Chalkidikí	department	B
GR-94	Chaniá	department	M
GR-85	Chíos	department	K
GR-81	Dodekánisa	department	L
GR-52	Dráma	department	A
GR-71	Évros	department	A
GR-05	Evrytanía	department	H
GR-04	Évvoia	department	H
GR-63	Flórina	department	C
GR-07	Fokída	department	H
GR-06	Fthiótida	department	H
GR-51	Grevená	department	C
GR-14	Ileía	department	G
GR-53	Imathía	department	B
GR-33	Ioánnina	department	D
GR-91	Irakleío	department	M
GR-41	Kardítsa	department	E
GR-56	Kastoriá	department	C
GR-55	Kavála	department	A
GR-23	Kefallinía	department	F
GR-22	Kérkyra	department	F
GR-57	Kilkís	department	B
GR-15	Korinthía	department	J
GR-58	Kozáni	department	C
GR-82	Kykládes	department	L
GR-16	Lakonía	department	J
GR-42	Lárisa	department	E
GR-92	Lasíthi	department	M
GR-24	Lefkáda	department	F
GR-83	Lésvos	department	K
GR-43	Magnisía	department	E
GR-17	Messinía	department	J
GR-59	Pélla	department	B
GR-61	Piería	department	B
GR-34	Préveza	department	D
GR-93	Rethýmnis	department	M
GR-73	Rodópi	department	A
GR-84	Sámos	department	K
GR-62	Sérres	department	B
GR-32	Thesprotía	department	D
GR-54	Thessaloníki	department	B
GR-44	Tríkala	department	E
GR-03	Voiotía	department	H
GR-72	Xánthi	department	A
GR-21	Zákynthos	department	F

== See also ==
- Subdivisions of Greece
- FIPS region codes of Greece
- NUTS codes of Greece
- Neighbouring countries: AL, BG, MK, TR
