= .xk =

Proposed top-level domain for Kosovo

- TLD type: Temporary country code top-level domain
- Status: Temporary (not in root)
- Registry: None
- Sponsor: None
- Intended use: Entities connected with Kosovo
- Registry website: None

.xk is a temporary, unofficial country code top-level domain for Kosovo, assigned under the United Nations Security Council Resolution 1244 in 1999.

XK falls under the ISO 3166-1 "alpha-2 user-assigned codes", which include AA, ZZ, QM to QZ and XA to XZ. This means it is reserved for private use and will not be permanently assigned to any entity – nor used as a country code top-level domain. Thus, its use is unofficial and temporary, until Kosovo is assigned its own alpha-2 country code, with possible options including .ka, .ks, .kv, and .ko (although the latter may not be chosen due to its possible use for a reunified Korea, if North and South Korea's current domains, .kp and .kr respectively, are superseded).

== See also ==
- XK (user assigned code)
- ISO 3166-1 alpha-2
- Proposed top-level domain
