= ISO 3166-2:RS =

Entry for Serbia in ISO 3166-2

ISO 3166-2:RS is the entry for Serbia in ISO 3166-2, part of the ISO 3166 standard published by the International Organization for Standardization (ISO), which defines codes for the names of the principal subdivisions (e.g., provinces or states) of all countries coded in ISO 3166-1.

Currently for Serbia, ISO 3166-2 codes are defined for two levels of subdivisions:

- two autonomous provinces
- one city and 29 districts

The city Belgrade is the capital of the country and has special status equal to the districts.

Each code consists of two parts separated by a hyphen. The first part is RS, the ISO 3166-1 alpha-2 code of Serbia. The second part is either of the following:

- two letters: autonomous provinces
- two digits: city and districts

The digits for the city and districts are assigned as follows:

- 00: city
- 01–07: districts in the autonomous province Vojvodina
- 08–24: districts in Central Serbia
- 25–29: districts in the claimed autonomous province Kosovo-Metohija (different from the districts established by the de facto independent Republic of Kosovo)

Before the dissolution of Serbia and Montenegro in 2006, Serbia was assigned the ISO 3166-2 code CS-SR under the entry for Serbia and Montenegro.

== Current codes ==
Subdivision names are listed as in the ISO 3166-2 standard published by the ISO 3166 Maintenance Agency (ISO 3166/MA).

Click on the button in the header to sort each column.

=== Autonomous provinces ===
Code	Subdivision name (sr) (UN III/11 1977)	Subdivision name (sr) (Note: For reference only, Serbian name in Cyrillic script not included in the ISO 3166-2 standard.)	Subdivision name (en) (Note: For reference only, English name not included in the ISO 3166-2 standard.)
RS-KM	Kosovo-Metohija	Косово и Метохија	Kosovo and Metohija
RS-VO	Vojvodina	Војводина	Vojvodina

=== City and districts ===
Code	Subdivision name (sr) (UN III/11 1977)	Subdivision name (sr)	Subdivision name (en)	Subdivision category	Parent subdivision
RS-00	Beograd	Београд	Belgrade	city	—
RS-14	Borski okrug	Борски округ	Bor	district	—
RS-11	Braničevski okrug	Браничевски округ	Braničevo	district	—
RS-23	Jablanički okrug	Јабланички округ	Jablanica	district	—
RS-06	Južnobački okrug	Јужнобачки округ	South Bačka	district	RS-VO
RS-04	Južnobanatski okrug	Јужнобанатски округ	South Banat	district	RS-VO
RS-09	Kolubarski okrug	Колубарски округ	Kolubara	district	—
RS-25	Kosovski okrug	Косовски округ	Kosovo	district	RS-KM
RS-28	Kosovsko-Mitrovački okrug	Косовскомитровачки округ	Kosovska Mitrovica	district	RS-KM
RS-29	Kosovsko-Pomoravski okrug	Косовскопоморавски округ	Kosovo-Pomoravlje	district	RS-KM
RS-08	Mačvanski okrug	Мачвански округ	Mačva	district	—
RS-17	Moravički okrug	Моравички округ	Moravica	district	—
RS-20	Nišavski okrug	Нишавски округ	Nišava	district	—
RS-24	Pčinjski okrug	Пчињски округ	Pčinja	district	—
RS-26	Pećki okrug	Пећки округ	Peć	district	RS-KM
RS-22	Pirotski okrug	Пиротски округ	Pirot	district	—
RS-10	Podunavski okrug	Подунавски округ	Podunavlje	district	—
RS-13	Pomoravski okrug	Поморавски округ	Pomoravlje	district	—
RS-27	Prizrenski okrug	Призренски округ	Prizren	district	RS-KM
RS-19	Rasinski okrug	Расински округ	Rasina	district	—
RS-18	Raški okrug	Рашки округ	Raška	district	—
RS-01	Severnobački okrug	Севернобачки округ	North Bačka	district	RS-VO
RS-03	Severnobanatski okrug	Севернобанатски округ	North Banat	district	RS-VO
RS-02	Srednjebanatski okrug	Средњобанатски округ	Central Banat	district	RS-VO
RS-07	Sremski okrug	Сремски округ	Srem	district	RS-VO
RS-12	Šumadijski okrug	Шумадијски округ	Šumadija	district	—
RS-21	Toplički okrug	Топлички округ	Toplica	district	—
RS-15	Zaječarski okrug	Зајечарски округ	Zaječar	district	—
RS-05	Zapadnobački okrug	Западнобачки округ	West Bačka	district	RS-VO
RS-16	Zlatiborski okrug	Златиборски округ	Zlatibor	district	—

== Changes ==
The following changes to the entry have been announced in newsletters by the ISO 3166/MA since the first publication of ISO 3166–2 in 1998. ISO stopped issuing newsletters in 2013.

Newsletter	Date issued	Description of change in newsletter	Code/Subdivision change
Newsletter I-8	2007-04-17	Addition of a new country (in accordance with ISO 3166-1 Newsletter V-12)	Subdivisions added: 1 city, 2 autonomous republics, 29 districts
Newsletter II-1	2010-02-03 (corrected 2010-02-19)	Addition of the country code prefix as the first code element, administrative update	

The following changes to the entry are listed on ISO's online catalogue, the Online Browsing Platform:

Effective date of change	Short description of change (en)
2014-12-18	Alignment of the French short name lower case with UNTERM
2010-02-19	Addition of the country code prefix as the first code element, administrative update

== See also ==
- Country codes of Serbia
- Subdivisions of Serbia
- NUTS codes of Serbia
- Neighbouring countries: AL (via XK), BA, BG, HR, HU, ME, MK, RO
