= Western Slovenia =

Coordinates: 46°06′00″N 14°09′00″E

Western Slovenia Zahodna Slovenija (Slovene)
- Region
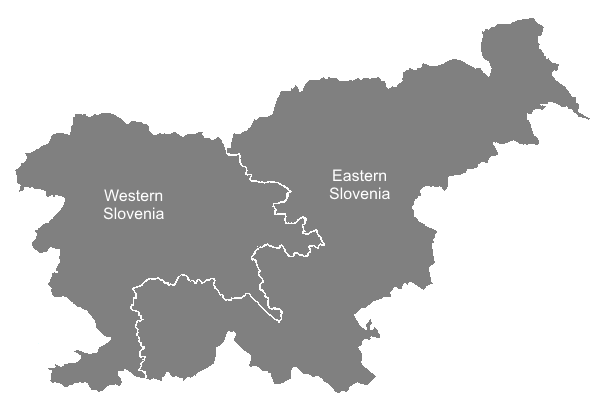
- Country: Slovenia

Area
  - Total: 7,839.9 km^{2} (3,027.0 sq mi)

Population (2021)
  - Total: 1,001,829
  - Density: 128/km^{2} (330/sq mi)

GDP
  - Total: €39.245 billion (2024)
  - Per capita: €38,589 (2024)
- NUTS code: SI04
- HDI (2022): 0.942 very high

Western Slovenia (Zahodna Slovenija) is a subdivision of Slovenia as defined by the Nomenclature of Territorial Units for Statistics (NUTS). It is classified as a NUTS-2 statistical region of Slovenia. The region forms the western part of the country, encompassing an area of 7,839.9 km^{2} (3,027.0 sq mi). It incorporates four statistical regions–Central Slovenia, Upper Carniola, Gorizia, and Coastal–Karst. It has a population of more than a million, and includes the capital and largest city of Ljubljana.

== Classification ==
The country of Slovenia is organized into 12 statistical regions for the purpose of the Regional policy of the European Union. These serve no administrative function, and the country is organized into 62 administrative divisions and 212 municipalities for administrative purposes. The Nomenclature of Territorial Units for Statistics (NUTS) organizes the country into two broader level sub-divisions based on cardinal directions. These are classified as a NUTS-2 statistical regions of Slovenia, and incorporate various statistical regions within it.

== Geography ==
Western Slovenia forms the western part of the country, encompassing an area of 7,839.9 km^{2} (3,027.0 sq mi). The region is located in Central Europe, towards the borders of Southern Europe and South Eastern Europe. It shares land borders with Austria in the north, Italy in the west, Croatia in the south, and is bound by Eastern Slovenia towards the east. The region is mostly hilly, with the Alps dominating the northern region towards Austria. Most of the areas are located at least 200 m (660 ft) above the mean sea level. The region has a coastline of 48 km (30 mi) along the Adriatic Sea between Italy and Croatia, which is the only Slovenian access to the sea.

It had a population of over one million in 2024, housing roughly half of the population of the country. It includes the capital and largest city of Ljubljana, and the cities of Kranj and Koper. Most of the population is made up of Slovene people, who speak Slovene language and practice Christianity. Minorities include Italians and Hungarians. The region has a high Human Development Index, and is more developed than the other region of Slovenia.

=== Sub-divisions ===
Western Slovenia incorporates four statistical regions–Central Slovenia, Upper Carniola, Gorizia, and Coastal–Karst.

Sub-divisions
Name	Official name	NUTS code	Area	Population (2021)	Density (per km^{2})
Central Slovenia	Osrednjeslovenska	SI041	2,333.9 km^{2} (901.1 sq mi)	564,527	238.7
Upper Carniola	Gorenjska	SI042	2,136.5 km^{2} (824.9 sq mi)	204,670	98.3
Gorizia	Goriška	SI043	2,325.1 km^{2} (897.7 sq mi)	117,616	51.1
Coastal–Karst	Obalno-Kraška	SI044	1,044.4 km^{2} (403.2 sq mi)	115,016	112.3
Western Slovenia	Zahodna Slovenija	SI04	7,839.9 km^{2} (3,027.0 sq mi)	1,001,829	128

== See also ==
- Eastern Slovenia
