= ISO 3166-2:ME =

Entry for Montenegro in ISO 3166-2

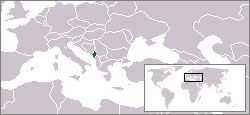
Location of Montenegro in Europe

ISO 3166-2:ME is the entry for Montenegro in ISO 3166-2, part of the ISO 3166 standard published by the International Organization for Standardization (ISO), which defines codes for the names of the principal subdivisions (e.g., provinces or states) of all countries coded in ISO 3166-1.

Currently for Montenegro, ISO 3166-2 codes are defined for 25 municipalities.

Each code consists of two parts, separated by a hyphen. The first part is ME, the ISO 3166-1 alpha-2 code of Montenegro. The second part is two digits (01–25).

Before the dissolution of Serbia and Montenegro in 2006, Montenegro was assigned the ISO 3166-2 code CS-CG under the entry for Serbia and Montenegro.

== Current codes ==
Subdivision names are listed as in the ISO 3166-2 standard published by the ISO 3166 Maintenance Agency (ISO 3166/MA).

Click on the button in the header to sort each column.

Code	Subdivision name (cnr)	Subdivision name (cnr) (Note: For reference only, Montenegrin name in Cyrillic script not included in the ISO 3166-2 standard.)
ME-01	Andrijevica	Андријевица
ME-02	Bar	Бар
ME-03	Berane	Беране
ME-04	Bijelo Polje	Бијело Поље
ME-05	Budva	Будва
ME-06	Cetinje	Цетиње
ME-07	Danilovgrad	Даниловград
ME-22	Gusinje	Гусиње
ME-08	Herceg-Novi	Херцег Нови
ME-09	Kolašin	Колашин
ME-10	Kotor	Котор
ME-11	Mojkovac	Мојковац
ME-12	Nikšić	Никшић
ME-23	Petnjica	Петњица
ME-13	Plav	Плав
ME-14	Pljevlja	Пљевља
ME-15	Plužine	Плужине
ME-16	Podgorica	Подгорица
ME-17	Rožaje	Рожаје
ME-18	Šavnik	Шавник
ME-19	Tivat	Тиват
ME-24	Tuzi	Тузи
ME-20	Ulcinj	Улцињ
ME-21	Žabljak	Жабљак
ME-25	Zeta	Зета

== Changes ==
The following changes to the entry have been announced in newsletters by the ISO 3166/MA since the first publication of ISO 3166-2 in 1998. ISO stopped issuing newsletters in 2013.

Newsletter	Date issued	Description of change in newsletter	Code/Subdivision change
Newsletter I-8	2007-04-17	Addition of a new country (in accordance with ISO 3166-1 Newsletter V-12)	Subdivisions added: 21 municipalities
Newsletter II-3	2011-12-13 (corrected 2011-12-15)	Local generic administrative term addition and suppression of the comment.	

The following changes to the entry are listed on ISO's online catalogue, the Online Browsing Platform:

Effective date of change	Short description of change (en)
2023-11-23	Addition of municipality ME-25; Update List Source
2019-11-22	Addition of municipality ME-24; Update List Source
2018-03-26	Addition of the alpha 3 administrative language code cnr. Modification of remark part 1.
2018-03-26	Deletion of remark part 2.
2015-11-27	Correction of quotation marks in the remark
2015-02-26	Correction of the Remarks to Parts 1 and 2 concerning the language code "001" to read "The language code "001" refers to the administrative language "Montenegrin" that has not been assigned an ISO 639 language code."
2014-11-03	Add two municipalities ME-22 and ME-23
2011-12-13	Local generic administrative term addition and suppression of the comment.
2008-04-08	Change of full name

== See also ==
- Subdivisions of Montenegro
- Neighbouring countries: AL, BA, HR, RS (also XK)
