= Subdivisions of Greece =

This is a list of the subdivisions of Greece.

== Administrative divisions ==
- Mount Athos
- Municipalities and communities of Greece
  - LAU 1 Municipalities/Communities (Dimoi/Koinotites) until 2010: 1034
  - LAU 2 Municipal Districts/Community Districts (Demotiko Diamerisma/Koinotiko Diamerisma): 6130
  - List of municipalities and communities in Greece (1997–2010)
  - List of municipalities of Greece (2011)
- Prefectures of Greece (first existed in 1833, abolished in 2010, by 2010 there were 51) / Greek: νομοί, sing. νομός, called departments in ISO 3166-2:GR
- Provinces of Greece 147, last abolished in 2006 / Greek: επαρχία, "eparchy"
- Regional units of Greece / 74 / Περιφερειακή ενότητα / NUTS 3
- Regions of Greece / 13, περιφέρειες / NUTS 2
- Super-prefectures of Greece, there were three

== Others ==
- Geographic regions of Greece / nine regions, six with land on the mainland and three only including islands / Greek: γεωγραφικά διαμερίσματα, romanized: geografika diamerísmata, lit. 'geographic departments'
- NUTS statistical regions of Greece
  - NUTS1 Groups of Development Regions
- Parliamentary constituencies of Greece
