= Eastern Slovenia =

Coordinates: 46°05′00″N 15°27′00″E

Eastern Slovenia Vzhodna Slovenija (Slovene)
- Region
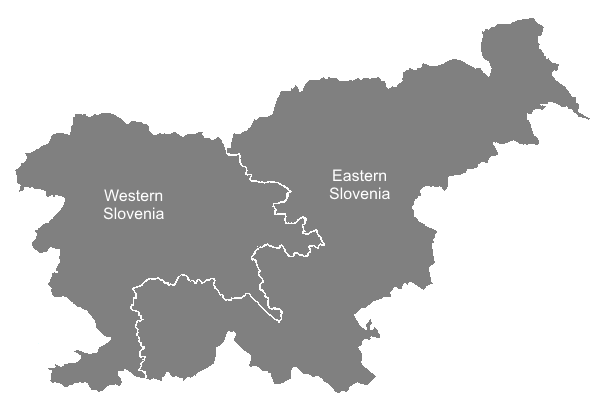
- Country: Slovenia

Area
  - Total: 12,433.1 km^{2} (4,800.4 sq mi)

Population (2021)
  - Total: 1,105,046
  - Density: 88.1/km^{2} (228/sq mi)

GDP
  - Total: €28.173 billion (2024)
  - Per capita: €25,313 (2024)
- NUTS code: SI04
- HDI (2022): 0.888 very high

Eastern Slovenia (Vzhodna Slovenija) is a subdivision of Slovenia as defined by the Nomenclature of Territorial Units for Statistics (NUTS). It is classified as a NUTS-2 statistical region of Slovenia. The region forms the eastern part of the country, encompassing an area of 12,433.1 km^{2} (4,800.4 sq mi). It incorporates eight statistical regions–Mura, Drava, Carinthia, Savinja, Central Sava, Lower Sava, Southeast Slovenia, and Littoral–Inner Carniola. It has a population of more than a million, and the largest cities include Maribor and Celje.

== Classification ==
The country of Slovenia is organized into 12 statistical regions for the purpose of the Regional policy of the European Union. These serve no administrative function, and the country is organized into 62 administrative divisions and 212 municipalities for administrative purposes. The Nomenclature of Territorial Units for Statistics (NUTS) organizes the country into two broader level sub-divisions based on cardinal directions. These are classified as a NUTS-2 statistical regions of Slovenia, and incorporate various statistical regions within it.

== Geography ==
Eastern Slovenia forms the eastern part of the country, encompassing an area of 12,433.1 km^{2} (4,800.4 sq mi). The region is located in Central Europe, towards the borders of Southern Europe and South Eastern Europe. It shares land borders with Austria in the north, Hungary to the north-east, Croatia to the east and south, and is bound by Western Slovenia towards the west. The region is mostly hilly, with most of the areas are located at least 200 m (660 ft) above the mean sea level. The region is landlocked and does not have access to sea. The only Slovenian coastline along the Adriatic Sea is located in the Western part of the country.

It had a population of over one million in 2024, housing roughly half of the population of the country. It includes the cities of Maribor and Celje. Most of the population is made up of Slovenes, who speak Slovene and practice Christianity. Minorities include Italians and Hungarians. Although the region has a high Human Development Index, it is comparatively less developed than the other region of Slovenia.

=== Sub-divisions ===
Eastern Slovenia incorporates eight statistical regions–Mura, Drava, Carinthia, Savinja, Central Sava, Lower Sava, Southeast Slovenia, and Littoral–Inner Carniola.

Sub-divisions
Name	Slovene name	NUTS code	Largest city	Area	Population (2021)	Density (per km^{2})	HDI
Mura	Pomurska	SI031	Murska Sobota	1,337.2 km^{2} (516.3 sq mi)	114,287	85.5	0.868
Drava	Podravska	SI032	Maribor	2,169.7 km^{2} (837.7 sq mi)	324,104	149.4	0.898
Carinthia	Koroška	SI033	Slovenj Gradec	1,040.8 km^{2} (401.9 sq mi)	70,588	67.8	0.892
Savinja	Savinjska	SI034	Celje	2,301 km^{2} (888 sq mi)	261,851	113.8	0.903
Central Sava	Zasavska	SI035	Trbovlje	485.1 km^{2} (187.3 sq mi)	57,533	118.6	0.848
Lower Sava	Posavska	SI036	Krško	968.2 km^{2} (373.8 sq mi)	70,067	72.4	0.889
Southeast Slovenia	Jugovzhodna Slovenija	SI037	Novo Mesto	2,675 km^{2} (1,033 sq mi)	144,032	53.8	0.905
Littoral–Inner Carniola	Primorsko-Notranjska	SI038	Postojna	1,456.1 km^{2} (562.2 sq mi)	52,544	36.1	0.888
Eastern Slovenia	Vzhodna Slovenija	SI03		12,433.1 km^{2} (4,800.4 sq mi)	1,105,046	88.1	0.888

== See also ==
- Western Slovenia
