= Counties of Hungary =

First-level administrative divisions of Hungary

Counties of Hungary Magyarország megyéi (Hungarian)
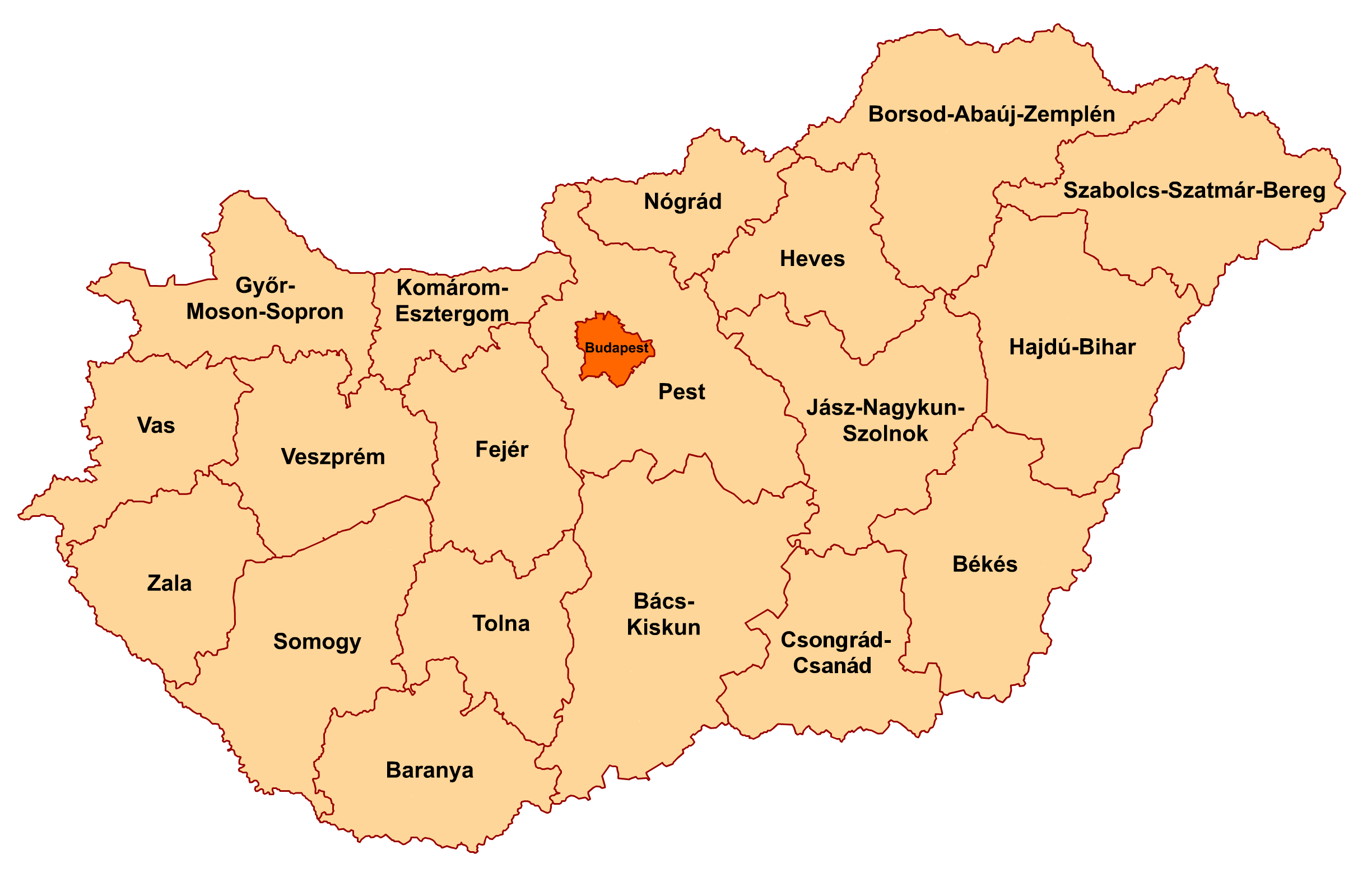
- Category: Unitary state
- Location: Hungary
- Created: 1950 (current form, 19 + Budapest)
- Number: 19 (as of 1950)
- Additional status: Electoral constituency
- Populations: 189,304 (Nógrád) – 1,278,874 (Pest)
- Areas: 2,265 km^{2} (875 sq mi) (Komárom-Esztergom) – 8,445 km^{2} (3,261 sq mi) (Bács-Kiskun)
- Government: County, national
- Subdivisions: District; Municipality/town/commune/sector

Hungary is subdivided administratively into 19 counties (megyék, singular: megye) and the capital city (főváros) Budapest. The counties are further subdivided into 174 districts (járások, singular: járás). The capital Budapest is subdivided into 23 districts (kerületek, singular: kerület).

There are 25 cities with county rights (megyei jogú városok, singular: megyei jogú város), sometimes called urban counties. The local authorities of these towns have extended powers but they are not independent territorial units.

The current system of counties has evolved from medieval fiefdoms of the Kingdom of Hungary; each fiefdom was ruled from a castle (Hungarian: vár). Between 2023 and 2026, the counties of Hungary were officially called vármegye, the original historical name.

== List of counties ==
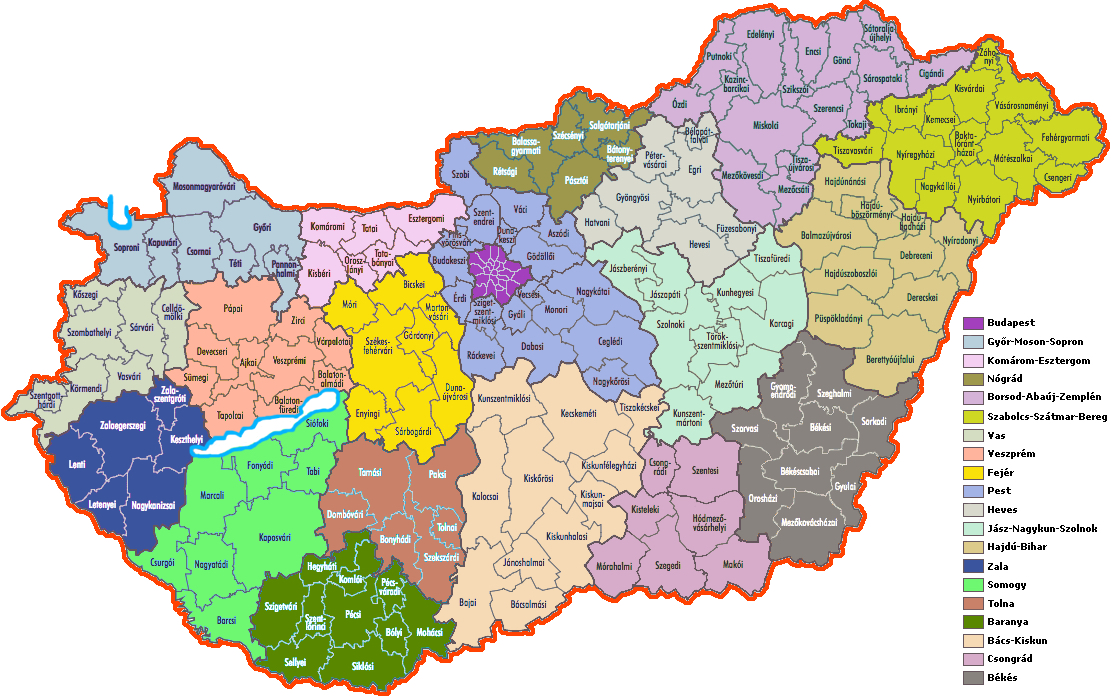
Hungarian counties with the 174 districts (járások) and the 23 districts of Budapest (kerületek).

Hungarian counties
County	Coat of arms	County seat	Region	Area (km²)	Population (2019)	Population density (people/km², 2019)	Map	No. of districts	No. of municipalities
Baranya		Pécs	Southern Transdanubia	4429.60	360,704	81	Map of Hungary highlighting Baranya County	10	301
Bács-Kiskun		Kecskemét	Southern Great Plain	8444.89	503,825	60	Map of Hungary highlighting Bács-Kiskun County	11	119
Békés		Békéscsaba	Southern Great Plain	5629.71	334,264	59	Map of Hungary highlighting Békés County	9	75
Borsod-Abaúj-Zemplén		Miskolc	Northern Hungary	7247.19	642,447	89	Map of Hungary highlighting Borsod-Abaúj-Zemplén County	16	358
Budapest		Municipality of Budapest (Note: Budapest is not a county, but a municipality that has an identical administrative status to all the other 19 counties.)	Central Hungary	525.14	1,752,286	3337	Map of Hungary highlighting Budapest	23	–
Csongrád-Csanád		Szeged	Southern Great Plain	4262.79	399,012	94	Map of Hungary highlighting Csongrád County	7	60
Fejér		Székesfehérvár	Central Transdanubia	4358.48	417,712	96	Map of Hungary highlighting Fejér County	8	108
Győr-Moson-Sopron		Győr	Western Transdanubia	4207.79	467,144	111	Map of Hungary highlighting Győr-Moson-Sopron County	7	183
Hajdú-Bihar		Debrecen	Northern Great Plain	6210.39	527,989	85	Map of Hungary highlighting Hajdú-Bihar County	10	82
Heves		Eger	Northern Hungary	3637.17	294,609	81	Map of Hungary highlighting Heves County	7	121
Jász-Nagykun-Szolnok		Szolnok	Northern Great Plain	5581.63	370,007	66	Map of Hungary highlighting Jász-Nagykun-Szolnok County	9	78
Komárom-Esztergom		Tatabánya	Central Transdanubia	2264.35	299,207	132	Map of Hungary highlighting Komárom-Esztergom County	6	76
Nógrád		Salgótarján	Northern Hungary	2544.48	189,304	74	Map of Hungary highlighting Nógrád County	6	131
Pest		Budapest	Central Hungary	6391.18	1,278,874	200	Map of Hungary highlighting Pest County	18	187
Somogy		Kaposvár	Southern Transdanubia	6065.06	301,429	50	Map of Hungary highlighting Somogy County	8	245
Szabolcs-Szatmár-Bereg		Nyíregyháza	Northern Great Plain	5935.92	552,964	93	Map of Hungary highlighting Szabolcs-Szatmár-Bereg County	13	229
Tolna		Szekszárd	Southern Transdanubia	3703.20	217,463	59	Map of Hungary highlighting Tolna County	6	109
Vas		Szombathely	Western Transdanubia	3336.11	253,551	76	Map of Hungary highlighting Vas County	7	216
Veszprém		Veszprém	Central Transdanubia	4463.64	341,317	76	Map of Hungary highlighting Veszprém County	10	217
Zala		Zalaegerszeg	Western Transdanubia	3783.84	268,648	71	Map of Hungary highlighting Zala County	6	258
Hungary		Budapest		93,023	9,772,756	105	Map of Hungary	174	3176

There are seven towns with county's rights in addition to the county seats:

- Baja (Bács-Kiskun county)
- Dunaújváros (Fejér county)
- Esztergom (Komárom-Esztergom county)
- Érd (Pest county)
- Hódmezővásárhely (Csongrád-Csanád county)
- Nagykanizsa (Zala county)
- Sopron (Győr-Moson-Sopron county)

=== Codes of the counties ===
County	ISO 3166-2	NUTS	Phone prefix	Postal code
Baranya	HU-BA	HU231	69, 72, 73	73xx, 75xx – 79xx
Bács-Kiskun	HU-BK	HU331	76, 77, 78, 79	60xx – 65xx
Békés	HU-BE	HU332	66, 68	55xx – 59xx
Borsod-Abaúj-Zemplén	HU-BZ	HU311	46, 47, 48, 49	34xx – 39xx
Budapest	HU-BU	HU101	1	1xxx
Csongrád-Csanád	HU-CS	HU333	62, 63	66xx – 69xx
Fejér	HU-FE	HU211	22, 25	206x, 209x, 24xx, 700x – 701x, 7041, 80xx, 811x – 815x
Győr-Moson-Sopron	HU-GS	HU221	96, 99	90xx – 94xx
Hajdú-Bihar	HU-HB	HU321	52, 54	40xx – 422x, 4241 – 4243, 425x – 429x
Heves	HU-HE	HU312	36, 37	300x – 304x, 32xx – 33xx
Jász-Nagykun-Szolnok	HU-JN	HU322	56, 57, 59	50xx – 54xx
Komárom-Esztergom	HU-KE	HU212	33, 34	2027 – 2028, 2067, 25xx, 28xx – 29xx
Nógrád	HU-NO	HU313	32, 35	2175 – 2179, 2610, 2611, 2616 – 2619, 264x – 269x, 304x – 31xx
Pest	HU-PE	HU102	23, 24, 26, 27, 28, 29, 53	20xx – 23xx, 2440, 2461, 260x – 263x, 2680 – 2683, 27xx
Somogy	HU-SO	HU232	82, 84, 85	7253 – 729x, 74xx – 75xx, 7918, 7977 – 7979, 86xx – 873x, 884x – 885x
Szabolcs-Szatmár-Bereg	HU-SZ	HU323	42, 44, 45	423x, 4244 – 4246, 4267, 43xx – 49xx
Tolna	HU-TO	HU233	74, 75	702x – 7252, 7352 – 7361
Vas	HU-VA	HU222	94, 95	95xx – 99xx
Veszprém	HU-VE	HU213	87, 88, 89	810x, 816x – 819x, 830x – 8352, 84xx – 85xx
Zala	HU-ZA	HU223	83, 92, 93	8353 – 839x, 874x – 879x, 880x – 883x, 8855, 8856, 886x – 889x, 89xx

== See also ==
- Regions of Hungary
- Districts of Hungary (from 2013) – Subregions of Hungary (until 2013)
- Ranked list of Hungarian counties
- List of cities and towns of Hungary
- NUTS:HU
- Administrative divisions of the Kingdom of Hungary (until 1918)
  - Counties of the Kingdom of Hungary
- Administrative divisions of the Kingdom of Hungary (1941–44)
