= Sveta Trojica v Slovenskih Goricah =

Locality of Slovenia

Sveta Trojica v Slovenskih Goricah Gradišče (v Slovenskih Goricah) (1952–1992)
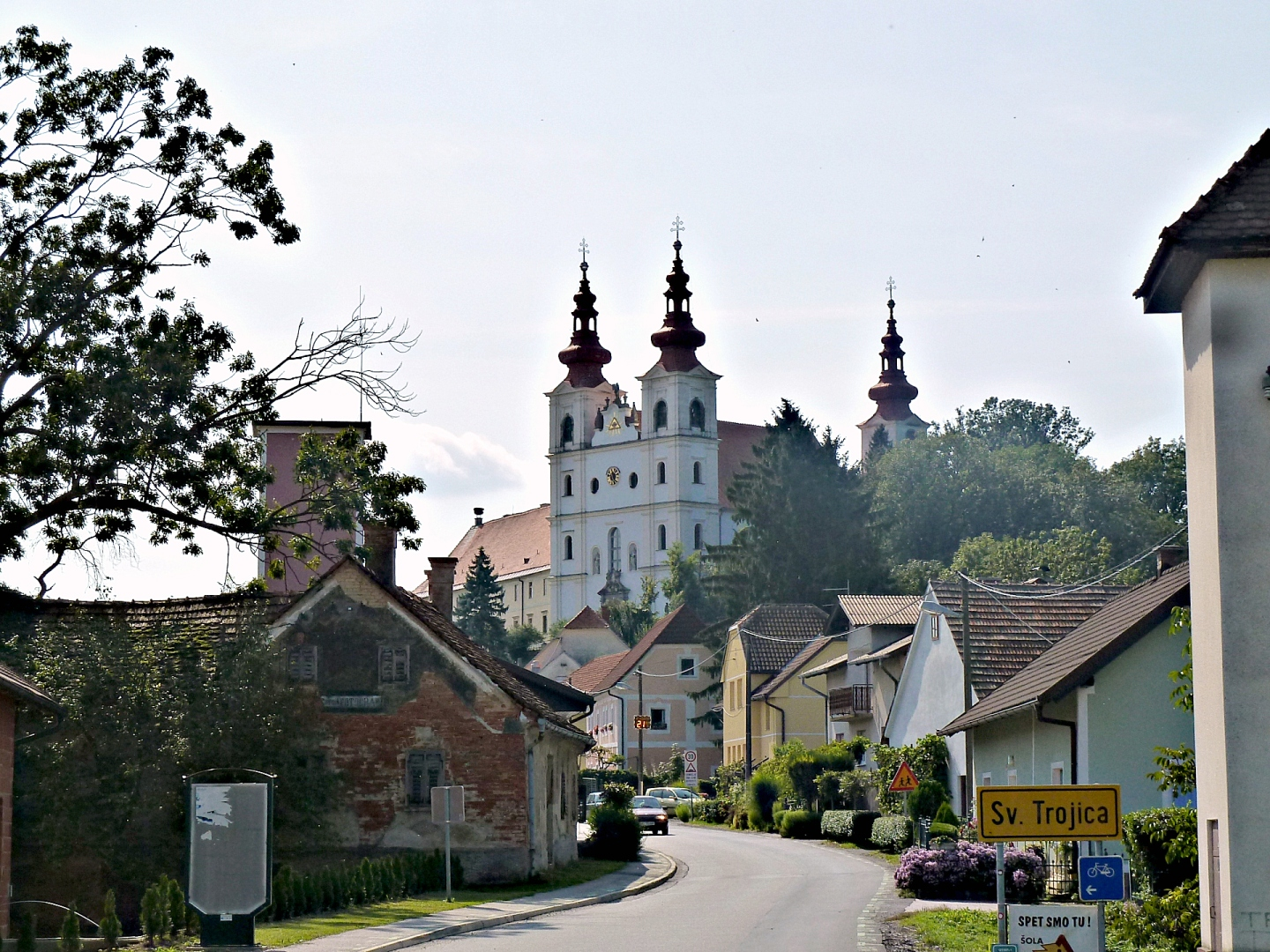

- Flag Coat of arms

- Location in Slovenia
- Coordinates: 46°34′32″N 15°52′37″E
- Country: Slovenia
- Traditional region: Styria
- Statistical region: Drava
- Municipality: Sveta Trojica v Slovenskih Goricah

Area
  - Total: 2.49 km^{2} (0.96 sq mi)
- Elevation: 284.5 m (933 ft)

Population (2019)
  - Total: 754

Sveta Trojica v Slovenskih Goricah (pronounced [ˈsʋeːta tɾɔˈjiːtsa ʍ slɔˈʋeːnskiɣ ɡɔˈɾiːtsax]; Slovene: Sveta Trojica v Slovenskih goricah) is a settlement in northeastern Slovenia. It is the seat of the Municipality of Sveta Trojica v Slovenskih Goricah. It lies in the Slovene Hills (Slovenske gorice). The area is part of the traditional region of Lower Styria. It is now included in the Drava Statistical Region.

== Name ==
The name of the settlement was changed from Sveta Trojica v Slovenskih Goricah (literally, 'Holy Trinity in the Slovene Hills') to Gradišče (literally, 'fortified hillfort') in 1952. The name was changed on the basis of the 1948 Law on Names of Settlements and Designations of Squares, Streets, and Buildings as part of efforts by Slovenia's postwar communist government to remove religious elements from toponyms. The name was then changed from Gradišče to Gradišče v Slovenskih Goricah in 1953. The name Sveta Trojica v Slovenskih Goricah was restored in 1992.

== Church ==
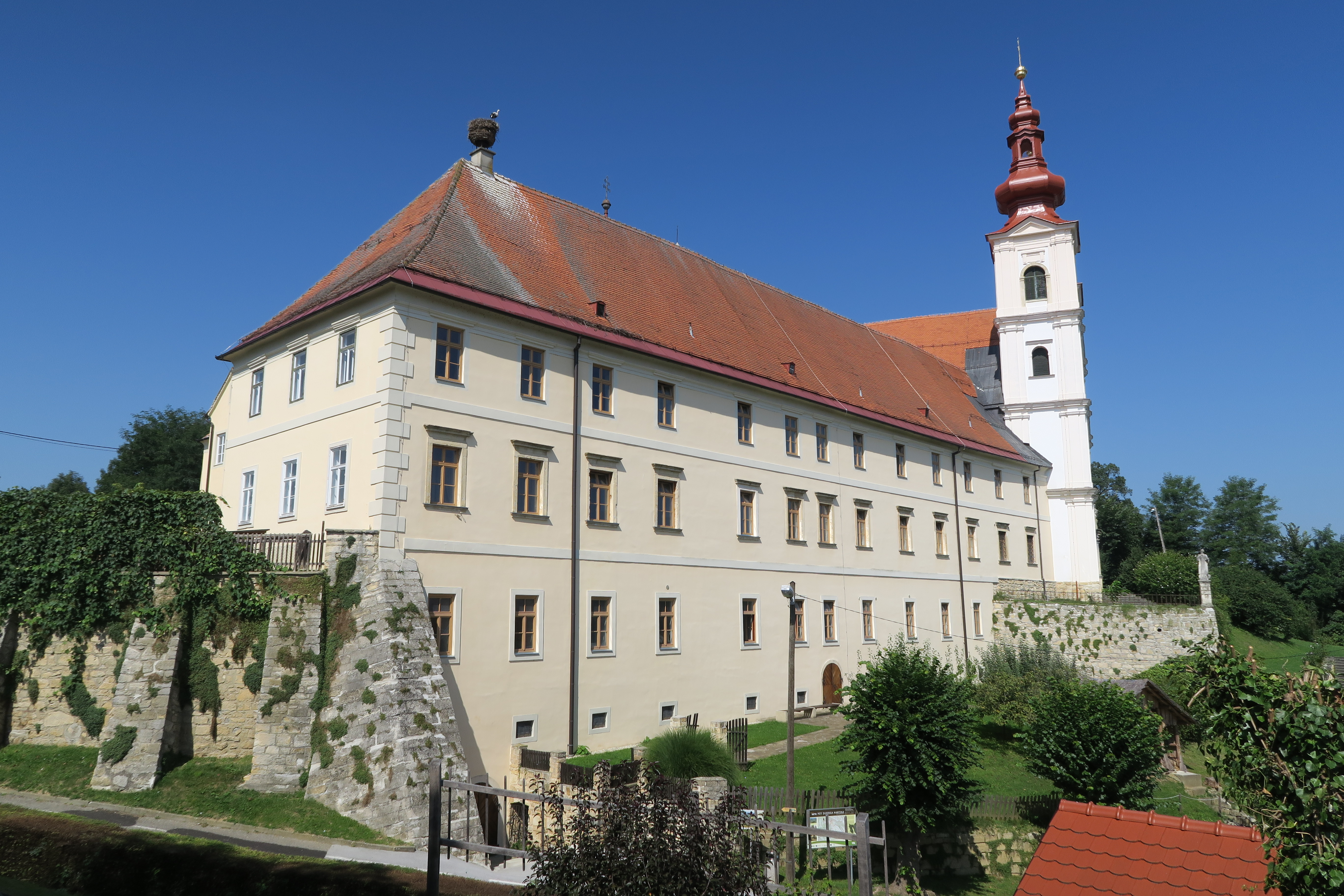
Holy Trinity Church

The local landmark is the parish church in the settlement, from which the village gets its name. It is dedicated to the Holy Trinity (Slovene: sveta Trojica) and belongs to the Slovenian province of the Franciscan order (OFM). It is a large Baroque church with three belfries that also appear in the municipality's coat of arms. It was built between 1636 and 1643 and expanded between 1735 and 1740. There is also a Franciscan monastery in the village.

== Notable people ==
Notable people that were born or lived in Sveta Trojica v Slovenskih Goricah include:

- Ivo Brnčić (1912–1943), writer
- Boris Kraigher (1914–1967), politician, president of the Executive Council of the Socialist Republic of Slovenia
- Emerik Landergott (1872–1959), monk and author
- Nikolaj Meznarič (1847–1920), monk and author
- Rajko Slapernik (1896–1975), painter
- Vilko Veixl (1878–1950), merchant
- Benedikt Vogrin (between 1661 and 1662–1712), monk and preacher
