= NUTS statistical regions of Serbia =

Statistical regions of Serbia

As a candidate country of the European Union, Serbia (RS) is in the process of being included in the Nomenclature of Territorial Units for Statistics (NUTS). However, due to the ongoing dispute with Kosovo, it has not yet agreed with the European Commission and Eurostat. The proposed three NUTS levels are:

Level	Subdivisions	#
NUTS 1	Groups of Regions (Групе региона / Grupe regiona)	2
NUTS 2	Regions (Региони / Regioni)	5; 4 (de facto)
NUTS 3	Districts (Окрузи / Okruzi)	29; 24 (de facto)

== Local administrative units ==
Below the NUTS levels, the two LAU (Local Administrative Units) levels are:

Level	Subdivisions	#
LAU 1	Municipalities and cities (Општине и градови / Opštine i gradovi)	117+28
LAU 2	Settlements (Насеља / Naselja)	

== See also ==
- Administrative divisions of Serbia
- ISO 3166-2 codes of Serbia
