= ISO 3166-2:MK =

Entry for North Macedonia in ISO 3166-2

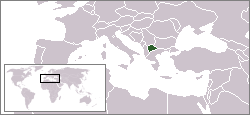
Map of the Republic of Macedonia

ISO 3166-2:MK is the entry for North Macedonia in ISO 3166-2, part of the ISO 3166 standard published by the International Organization for Standardization (ISO), which defines codes for the names of the principal subdivisions (e.g., provinces or states) of all countries coded in ISO 3166-1.

Currently for North Macedonia, ISO 3166-2 codes are defined for 80 municipalities.

Each code consists of two parts, separated by a hyphen. The first part is MK, the ISO 3166-1 alpha-2 code of North Macedonia. The second part is 3 digits.

== Current codes ==
Subdivision names are listed as in the ISO 3166-2 standard published by the ISO 3166 Maintenance Agency (ISO 3166/MA).

Subdivision names are sorted in Macedonian alphabetical order after romanization (different from the original Cyrillic order used to assign codes): a-c, č, d-s, š, t-z, ž.

Click on the button in the header to sort each column.

Code	Subdivision name (mk) (BGN/PCGN 2013)	Subdivision name (mk) (Note: For reference only, Macedonian name in Cyrillic script not included in the ISO 3166-2 standard.)
MK-801	Aerodrom	Аеродром
MK-802	Aračinovo	Арачиново
MK-201	Berovo	Берово
MK-501	Bitola	Битола
MK-401	Bogdanci	Богданци
MK-601	Bogovinje	Боговиње
MK-402	Bosilovo	Босилово
MK-602	Brvenica	Брвеница
MK-803	Butel	Бутел
MK-814	Centar	Центар
MK-313	Centar Župa	Центар Жупа
MK-815	Čair	Чаир
MK-109	Čaška	Чашка
MK-210	Češinovo-Obleševo	Чешиново-Облешево
MK-816	Čučer-Sandevo	Чучер-Сандево
MK-303	Debar	Дебар
MK-304	Debrca	Дебрца
MK-203	Delčevo	Делчево
MK-502	Demir Hisar	Демир Хисар
MK-103	Demir Kapija	Демир Капија
MK-406	Dojran	Дојран
MK-503	Dolneni	Долнени
MK-804	Gazi Baba	Гази Баба
MK-405	Gevgelija	Гевгелија
MK-805	Gjorče Petrov	Ѓорче Петров
MK-604	Gostivar	Гостивар
MK-102	Gradsko	Градско
MK-807	Ilinden	Илинден
MK-606	Jegunovce	Јегуновце
MK-205	Karbinci	Карбинци
MK-808	Karpoš	Карпош
MK-104	Kavadarci	Кавадарци
MK-307	Kičevo	Кичево
MK-809	Kisela Voda	Кисела Вода
MK-206	Kočani	Кочани
MK-407	Konče	Конче
MK-701	Kratovo	Кратово
MK-702	Kriva Palanka	Крива Паланка
MK-504	Krivogaštani	Кривогаштани
MK-505	Kruševo	Крушево
MK-703	Kumanovo	Куманово
MK-704	Lipkovo	Липково
MK-105	Lozovo	Лозово
MK-207	Makedonska Kamenica	Македонска Каменица
MK-308	Makedonski Brod	Македонски Брод
MK-607	Mavrovo i Rostuše	Маврово и Ростуше
MK-506	Mogila	Могила
MK-106	Negotino	Неготино
MK-507	Novaci	Новаци
MK-408	Novo Selo	Ново Село
MK-310	Ohrid	Охрид
MK-208	Pehčevo	Пехчево
MK-810	Petrovec	Петровец
MK-311	Plasnica	Пласница
MK-508	Prilep	Прилеп
MK-209	Probištip	Пробиштип
MK-409	Radoviš	Радовиш
MK-705	Rankovce	Ранковце
MK-509	Resen	Ресен
MK-107	Rosoman	Росоман
MK-811	Saraj	Сарај
MK-812	Sopište	Сопиште
MK-706	Staro Nagoričane	Старо Нагоричане
MK-312	Struga	Струга
MK-410	Strumica	Струмица
MK-813	Studeničani	Студеничани
MK-108	Sveti Nikole	Свети Николе
MK-211	Štip	Штип
MK-817	Šuto Orizari	Шуто Оризари
MK-608	Tearce	Теарце
MK-609	Tetovo	Тетово
MK-403	Valandovo	Валандово
MK-404	Vasilevo	Василево
MK-101	Veles	Велес
MK-301	Vevčani	Вевчани
MK-202	Vinica	Виница
MK-603	Vrapčište	Врапчиште
MK-806	Zelenikovo	Зелениково
MK-204	Zrnovci	Зрновци
MK-605	Želino	Желино

== Changes ==
The following changes to the entry have been announced in newsletters by the ISO 3166/MA since the first publication of ISO 3166-2 in 1998. ISO stopped issuing newsletters in 2013.

Newsletter	Date issued	Description of change in newsletter	Code/Subdivision change
Newsletter I-8	2007-04-17	Addition of the administrative subdivisions and of their code elements	Subdivisions added: 84 municipalities
Newsletter I-9	2007-11-28	Addition of numeric code elements	Codes: format changed (see below)
Newsletter II-3	2011-12-13 (corrected 2011-12-15)	Alphabetical re-ordering.	

The following changes to the entry are listed on ISO's online catalogue, the Online Browsing Platform:

Effective date of change	Short description of change (en)
2011-12-13	Alphabetical re-ordering.
2015-11-27	Deletion of municipalities MK-01, MK-09, MK-15, MK-17, MK-28, MK-29, MK-31, MK-38, MK-39, MK-57, MK-68, MK-77, MK-79, MK-84; deletion of remark; change romanization system; addition of municipality MK-85; update List Source
2019-03-13	Change of the short and full name: Macedonia (the former Yugoslav Republic of) → North Macedonia; the former Yugoslav Republic of Macedonia → Republic of North Macedonia
2020-03-02	Deletion of municipality MK-85; Change of subdivision code from MK-02 to MK-802, MK-03 to MK-201, MK-04 to MK-501, MK-05 to MK-401, MK-06 to MK-601, MK-07 to MK-402, MK-08 to MK-602, MK-10 to MK-403, MK-11 to MK-404, MK-12 to MK-301, MK-13 to MK-101, MK-14 to MK-202, MK-16 to MK-603, MK-18 to MK-405, MK-19 to MK-604, MK-20 to MK-102, MK-21 to MK-303, MK-22 to MK-304, MK-23 to MK-203, MK-24 to MK-103, MK-25 to MK-502, MK-26 to MK-406, MK-27 to MK-503, MK-30 to MK-605, MK-32 to MK-806, MK-33 to MK-204, MK-34 to MK-807, MK-35 to MK-606, MK-36 to MK-104, MK-37 to MK-205, MK-40 to MK-307, MK-41 to MK-407, MK-42 to MK-206, MK-43 to MK-701, MK-44 to MK-702, MK-45 to MK-504, MK-46 to MK-505, MK-47 to MK-703, MK-48 to MK-704, MK-49 to MK-105, MK-50 to MK-607, MK-51 to MK-207, MK-52 to MK-308, MK-53 to MK-506, MK-54 to MK-106, MK-55 to MK-507, MK-56 to MK-408, MK-58 to MK-310, MK-59 to MK-810, MK-60 to MK-208, MK-61 to MK-311, MK-62 to MK-508, MK-63 to MK-209, MK-64 to MK-409, MK-65 to MK-705, MK-66 to MK-509, MK-67 to MK-107, MK-69 to MK-108, MK-70 to MK-812, MK-71 to MK-706, MK-72 to MK-312, MK-73 to MK-410, MK-74 to MK-813, MK-75 to MK-608, MK-76 to MK-609, MK-78 to MK-313, MK-80 to MK-109, MK-81 to MK-210, MK-82 to MK-816, MK-83 to MK-211; Typographical correction of subdivision name of MK-816, addition of municipality MK-801, MK-803, MK-804, MK-805, MK-808, MK-809, MK-811, MK-814, MK-815, MK-817; Update List Source; Update Code Source

=== Codes changed in Newsletter I-9 ===
Before	After	Subdivision name
MK-AD	MK-01	Aerodrom
MK-AR	MK-02	Aračinovo
MK-BR	MK-03	Berovo
MK-TL	MK-04	Bitola
MK-BG	MK-05	Bogdanci
MK-VJ	MK-06	Bogovinje
MK-BS	MK-07	Bosilovo
MK-BN	MK-08	Brvenica
MK-BU	MK-09	Butel
MK-CE	MK-77	Centar
MK-CZ	MK-78	Centar Župa
MK-CI	MK-79	Čair
MK-CA	MK-80	Čaška
MK-CH	MK-81	Češinovo-Obleševo
MK-CS	MK-82	Čučer Sandevo
MK-DB	MK-21	Debar
MK-DA	MK-22	Debarca
MK-DL	MK-23	Delčevo
MK-DM	MK-25	Demir Hisar
MK-DK	MK-24	Demir Kapija
MK-SD	MK-26	Dojran
MK-DE	MK-27	Dolneni
MK-DR	MK-28	Drugovo
MK-GB	MK-17	Gazi Baba
MK-GV	MK-18	Gevgelija
MK-GP	MK-29	Gjorče Petrov
MK-GT	MK-19	Gostivar
MK-GR	MK-20	Gradsko
MK-IL	MK-34	Ilinden
MK-JG	MK-35	Jegunovce
MK-KB	MK-37	Karbinci
MK-KX	MK-38	Karpoš
MK-AV	MK-36	Kavadarci
MK-KH	MK-40	Kičevo
MK-VD	MK-39	Kisela Voda
MK-OC	MK-42	Kočani
MK-KN	MK-41	Konče
MK-KY	MK-43	Kratovo
MK-KZ	MK-44	Kriva Palanka
MK-KG	MK-45	Krivogaštani
MK-KS	MK-46	Kruševo
MK-UM	MK-47	Kumanovo
MK-LI	MK-48	Lipkovo
MK-LO	MK-49	Lozovo
MK-MK	MK-51	Makedonska Kamenica
MK-MD	MK-52	Makedonski Brod
MK-MR	MK-50	Mavrovo i Rostuša
MK-MG	MK-53	Mogila
MK-NG	MK-54	Negotino
MK-NV	MK-55	Novaci
MK-NS	MK-56	Novo Selo
MK-OD	MK-58	Ohrid
MK-OS	MK-57	Oslomej
MK-PH	MK-60	Pehčevo
MK-PE	MK-59	Petrovec
MK-PN	MK-61	Plasnica
MK-PP	MK-62	Prilep
MK-PT	MK-63	Probištip
MK-RV	MK-64	Radoviš
MK-RN	MK-65	Rankovce
MK-RE	MK-66	Resen
MK-RM	MK-67	Rosoman
MK-AJ	MK-68	Saraj
MK-SS	MK-70	Sopište
MK-NA	MK-71	Staro Nagoričane
MK-UG	MK-72	Struga
MK-RU	MK-73	Strumica
MK-SU	MK-74	Studeničani
MK-SL	MK-69	Sveti Nikole
MK-ST	MK-83	Štip
MK-SO	MK-84	Šuto Orizari
MK-TR	MK-75	Tearce
MK-ET	MK-76	Tetovo
MK-VA	MK-10	Valandovo
MK-VL	MK-11	Vasilevo
MK-VE	MK-13	Veles
MK-VV	MK-12	Vevčani
MK-NI	MK-14	Vinica
MK-VC	MK-15	Vraneštica
MK-VH	MK-16	Vrapčište
MK-ZA	MK-31	Zajas
MK-ZK	MK-32	Zelenikovo
MK-ZR	MK-33	Zrnovci
MK-ZE	MK-30	Želino

=== Codes deleted on 27 November 2015 ===
Former code	Subdivision name	Notes
MK-01	Aerodrom	Subsumed into Greater Skopje Municipality
MK-09	Butel	Subsumed into Greater Skopje Municipality
MK-77	Centar	Subsumed into Greater Skopje Municipality
MK-79	Čair	Subsumed into Greater Skopje Municipality
MK-28	Drugovo	Merged with Kičevo Municipality
MK-17	Gazi Baba	Subsumed into Greater Skopje Municipality
MK-29	Gjorče Petrov	Subsumed into Greater Skopje Municipality
MK-38	Karpoš	Subsumed into Greater Skopje Municipality
MK-39	Kisela Voda	Subsumed into Greater Skopje Municipality
MK-57	Oslomej	Merged with Kičevo Municipality
MK-68	Saraj	Subsumed into Greater Skopje Municipality
MK-84	Šuto Orizari	Subsumed into Greater Skopje Municipality
MK-15	Vraneštica	Merged with Kičevo Municipality
MK-31	Zajas	Merged with Kičevo Municipality

== See also ==
- Subdivisions of North Macedonia
- FIPS region codes of North Macedonia
- NUTS codes of North Macedonia
- Neighbouring countries: AL, BG, GR, RS (also XK)
