= XK (user assigned code) =

ISO 3166-1 alpha-2 equivalent user-assigned code element for Kosovo

XK is an ISO 3166-1 alpha-2 equivalent user-assigned code element. It is de facto used to represent Kosovo. Similarly, XKX is an ISO 3166-1 alpha-3 equivalent user-assigned code element for Kosovo in the European Union, and XKK is used in the Unicode standard.

== Use ==
The following organizations have been known to have used the code XK to represent Kosovo:

- European Commission and in line with that many institutions in EU countries such as Deutsche Bundesbank, Ireland, Malta, Cyprus and France
- United Kingdom
- Canada
- Switzerland
- International Monetary Fund
- Society for Worldwide Interbank Financial Telecommunication
- Common Locale Data Repository
- Unicode Regional indicator symbol
- United States Department of State

== Potential assignment of an official ISO 3166-1 code for Kosovo ==
According to rules of procedure followed by the ISO 3166 Maintenance Agency, a new ISO 3166-1 code for Kosovo will be issued once it appears in the UN Terminology Bulletin "Country Names" or in the UN Statistics Division's "list of Country and Region Codes for Statistical Use". To appear in the terminology bulletin, Kosovo must either (a) be admitted into the United Nations, (b) join a UN Specialised Agency or (c) become a state party to the Statute of the International Court of Justice. Criterion (b) was met when Kosovo joined the International Monetary Fund and World Bank in June 2009, but a terminology bulletin has yet to be circulated.

ISO affirms that no code beginning with "X" will ever be standardised as a country code. ("XK" for Kosovo is a unilateral "user assigned code" and not an ISO 3166 standard country code.) Consequently if/when Kosovo is recognised, this XK code will need to be replaced with one beginning with another letter.

== See also ==
- .xk
- Neighbouring countries: AL, ME, MK, RS
