= ISO 3166-2:BA =

Entry for Bosnia and Herzegovina in ISO 3166-2

ISO 3166-2:BA is the entry for Bosnia and Herzegovina in ISO 3166-2, part of the ISO 3166 standard published by the International Organization for Standardization (ISO), which defines codes for the names of the principal subdivisions (e.g., provinces or states) of all countries coded in ISO 3166-1.

Currently for Bosnia and Herzegovina, ISO 3166-2 codes are defined for two entities and one district with special status. The Brčko District has special status, formally belonging to both entities but effectively self-governing.

Each code consists of two parts, separated by a hyphen. The first part is BA, the ISO 3166-1 alpha-2 code of Bosnia and Herzegovina. The second part is three letters.

== Current codes ==
Subdivision names are listed as in the ISO 3166-2 standard published by the ISO 3166 Maintenance Agency (ISO 3166/MA).

ISO 639-1 codes are used to represent subdivision names in the following administrative languages:

- (bs): Bosnian
- (hr): Croatian
- (sr): Serbian using UN III/11 1977 romanization

Click on the button in the header to sort each column.

Code	Subdivision name (bs), (hr), (sr)	Subdivision name (sr) (Note: For reference only, Serbian name in Cyrillic script not included in the ISO 3166-2 standard.)	Subdivision name (en) (Note: For reference only, English name not included in the ISO 3166-2 standard.)	Subdivision category
BA-BIH	Federacija Bosne i Hercegovine	Федерације Босне и Херцеговине	Federation of Bosnia and Herzegovina	entity
BA-SRP	Republika Srpska	Република Српска	Republika Srpska	entity
BA-BRC	Brčko Distrikt	Брчко Дистрикт	Brčko District	district with special status

== Changes ==
The following changes to the entry have been announced in newsletters by the ISO 3166/MA since the first publication of ISO 3166-2 in 1998. ISO stopped issuing newsletters in 2013.

Edition/Newsletter	Date issued	Description of change in newsletter	Code/Subdivision change
ISO 3166-2:2007	2007-12-13	Second edition of ISO 3166-2 (this change was not announced in a newsletter)	Subdivisions added: 10 cantons
Newsletter II-2	2010-06-30	Addition of the country code prefix as the first code element, addition of names in administrative languages, update of the administrative structure and of the list source	Subdivisions added: BA-BRC Brčko Distrikt

The following changes to the entry are listed on ISO's online catalogue, the Online Browsing Platform:

Effective date of change	Short description of change (en)
2010-06-30	Addition of the country code prefix as the first code element, addition of names in administrative languages, update of the administrative structure and of the list source
2010-12-15	Correct typographic error for the language code for Croatian
2015-11-27	Deletion of all cantons BA-01 to BA-10
2018-11-26	Correction of the romanization system label

=== Canton codes ===
Map of Bosnia and Herzegovina with each canton labelled with the second part of its ISO 3166-2 code (with leading digit 0 omitted).

Codes for the ten cantons of the Federation of Bosnia and Herzegovina were included until 27 November 2015.

Former code	Subdivision name (bs)	Subdivision name (hr)	Subdivision name (sr)	In entity
BA-05	Bosansko-podrinjski kanton	Bosansko-podrinjska županija	Bosansko-podrinjski kanton	BIH
BA-07	Hercegovačko-neretvanski kanton	Hercegovačko-neretvanska županija	Hercegovačko-neretvanski kanton	BIH
BA-10	Kanton br. 10 (Livanjski kanton)	Županija br. 10 (Hercegbosanska županija)	Kanton br. 10	BIH
BA-09	Kanton Sarajevo	Sarajevska županija	Kanton Sarajevo	BIH
BA-02	Posavski kanton	Posavska županija	Posavski kanton	BIH
BA-06	Srednjobosanski kanton	Srednjobosanska županija	Srednjobosanski kanton	BIH
BA-03	Tuzlanski kanton	Tuzlanska županija	Tuzlanski kanton	BIH
BA-01	Unsko-sanski kanton	Unsko-sanska županija	Unsko-sanski kanton	BIH
BA-08	Zapadnohercegovački kanton	Zapadnohercegovačka županija	Zapadnohercegovački kanton	BIH
BA-04	Zeničko-dobojski kanton	Zeničko-dobojska županija	Zeničko-dobojski kanton	BIH

== See also ==
- Subdivisions of Bosnia and Herzegovina
- FIPS region codes of Bosnia and Herzegovina
- Neighbouring countries: HR, ME, RS
