= Municipality of Sveta Trojica v Slovenskih Goricah =

Municipality of Slovenia

Municipality of Sveta Trojica v Slovenskih Goricah Občina Sveta Trojica v Slovenskih goricah
- Municipality
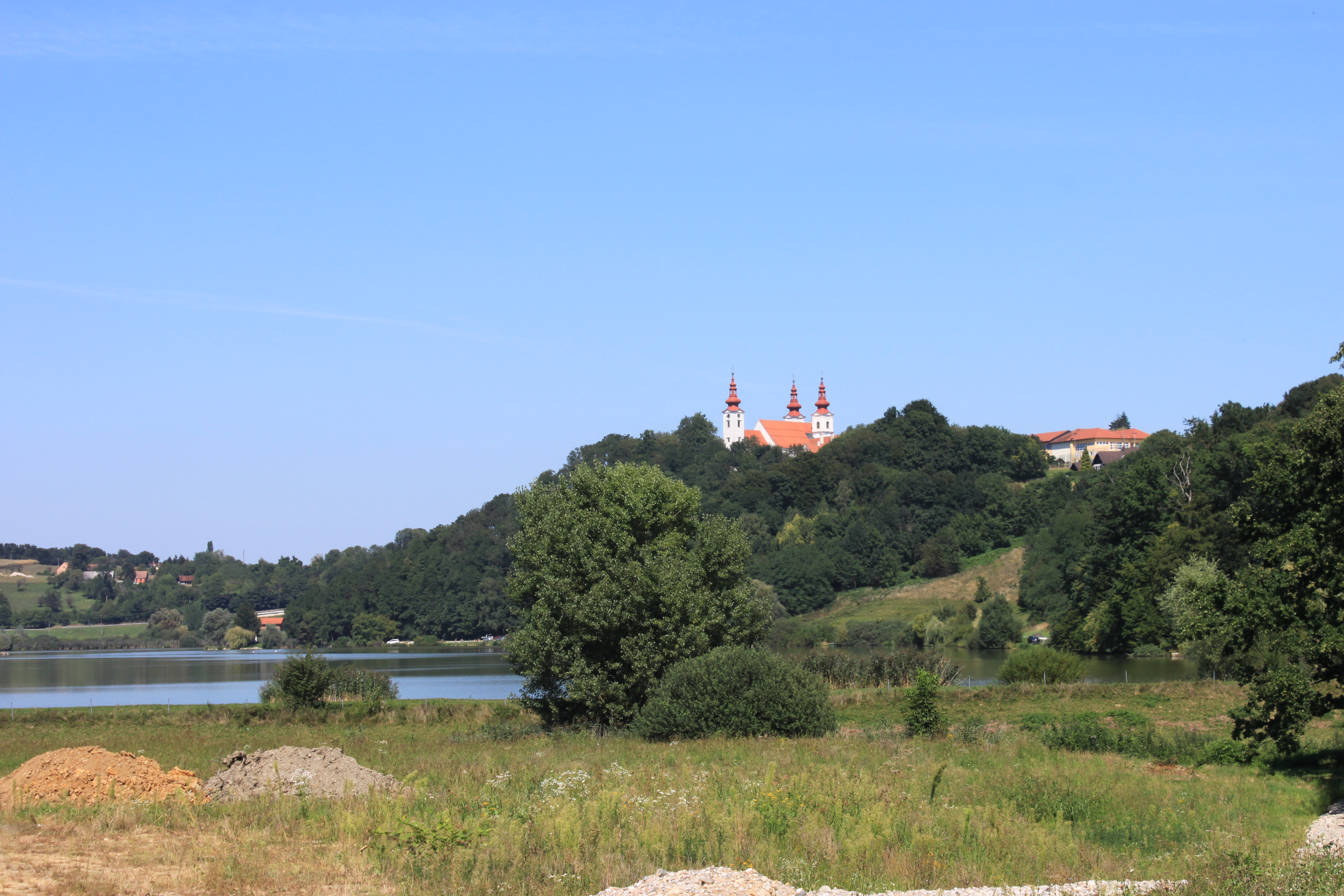

- Location of the Municipality of Sveta Trojica v Slovenskih Goricah in Slovenia
- Coordinates: 46°34′N 15°53′E
- Country: Slovenia

Government
  - Mayor: David Klobasa

Area
  - Total: 26.3 km^{2} (10.2 sq mi)

Population (July 1, 2018)
  - Total: 2,054
  - Density: 78.1/km^{2} (202/sq mi)
- Time zone: UTC+01 (CET)
  - Summer (DST): UTC+02 (CEST)
- Website: www.sv-trojica.si

The Municipality of Sveta Trojica v Slovenskih Goricah (pronounced [ˈsʋeːta tɾɔˈjiːtsa ʍ slɔˈʋeːnskiɣ ɡɔˈɾiːtsax]; Slovene: Občina Sveta Trojica v Slovenskih goricah) is a municipality in the traditional region of Styria in northeastern Slovenia. The seat of the municipality is the town of Sveta Trojica v Slovenskih Goricah.

Sveta Trojica v Slovenskih Goricah became a municipality in 2006.

== Settlements ==
In addition to the municipal seat of Sveta Trojica v Slovenskih Goricah, the municipality also includes the following settlements:

- Gočova
- Osek
- Spodnja Senarska
- Spodnje Verjane
- Zgornja Senarska
- Zgornje Verjane
- Zgornji Porčič
