= ISO 3166-2:HR =

Entry for Croatia in ISO 3166-2

ISO 3166-2:HR is the entry for Croatia in ISO 3166-2, part of the ISO 3166 standard published by the International Organization for Standardization (ISO), which defines codes for the names of the principal subdivisions (e.g., provinces or states) of all countries coded in ISO 3166-1.

Currently for Croatia, ISO 3166-2 codes are defined for one city and 20 counties. The city Zagreb is the capital of the country and has special status equal to the counties.

Each code consists of two parts, separated by a hyphen. The first part is HR, the ISO 3166-1 alpha-2 code of Croatia. The second part is two digits:

- 01–20: counties
- 21: city

== Current codes ==
Subdivision names are listed as in the ISO 3166-2 standard published by the ISO 3166 Maintenance Agency (ISO 3166/MA).

Subdivision names are sorted in Croatian alphabetical order: a-c, č, ć, d, dž, đ, e-l, lj, m-n, nj, o-s, š, t-z, ž.

Click on the button in the header to sort each column.

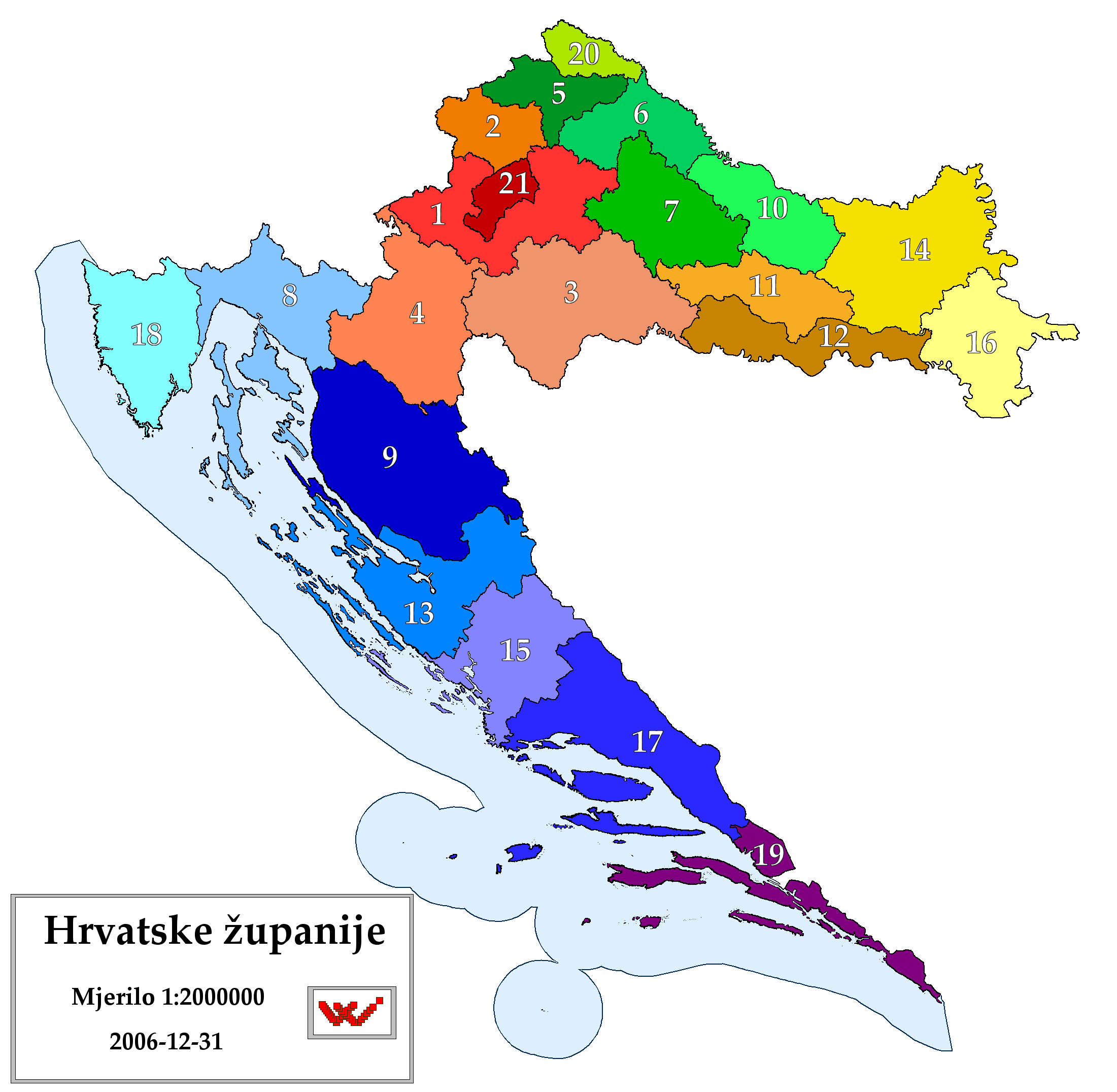
Map of Croatia with each county and the city Grad Zagreb labelled with the second part of its ISO 3166-2 code (with leading digit 0 omitted).

Code	Subdivision name (hr)	Subdivision name (en) (Note: For reference only, English name not included in the ISO 3166-2 standard.)	Subdivision category
HR-07	Bjelovarsko-bilogorska županija	Bjelovar-Bilogora	county
HR-12	Brodsko-posavska županija	Brod-Posavina	county
HR-19	Dubrovačko-neretvanska županija	Dubrovnik-Neretva	county
HR-21	Grad Zagreb	Zagreb City	city
HR-18	Istarska županija	Istria	county
HR-04	Karlovačka županija	Karlovac	county
HR-06	Koprivničko-križevačka županija	Koprivnica-Križevci	county
HR-02	Krapinsko-zagorska županija	Krapina-Zagorje	county
HR-09	Ličko-senjska županija	Lika-Senj	county
HR-20	Međimurska županija	Međimurje	county
HR-14	Osječko-baranjska županija	Osijek-Baranja	county
HR-11	Požeško-slavonska županija	Požega-Slavonia	county
HR-08	Primorsko-goranska županija	Primorje-Gorski Kotar	county
HR-03	Sisačko-moslavačka županija	Sisak-Moslavina	county
HR-17	Splitsko-dalmatinska županija	Split-Dalmatia	county
HR-15	Šibensko-kninska županija	Šibenik-Knin	county
HR-05	Varaždinska županija	Varaždin	county
HR-10	Virovitičko-podravska županija	Virovitica-Podravina	county
HR-16	Vukovarsko-srijemska županija	Vukovar-Srijem	county
HR-13	Zadarska županija	Zadar	county
HR-01	Zagrebačka županija	Zagreb County	county

== Changes ==
The following changes to the entry have been announced in newsletters by the ISO 3166/MA since the first publication of ISO 3166-2 in 1998:

Newsletter	Date issued	Description of change in newsletter	Code/Subdivision change
Newsletter I-2	2002-05-21	Addition of one city subdivision. Three spelling corrections	Subdivisions added: HR-21 Grad Zagreb
Newsletter II-3	2011-12-13 (corrected 2011-12-15)	Alphabetical re-ordering.	

== See also ==
- Administrative divisions of Croatia
- FIPS region codes of Croatia
- NUTS codes of Croatia
- Neighbouring countries: BA, HU, ME, RS, SI
