= Subdivisions of Slovenia =

Subdivisions of Slovenia:

- Cadastral community
- Municipalities of Slovenia
- Administrative divisions of Slovenia
- NUTS of Slovenia
- Statistical regions of Slovenia
- ISO 3166-2:SI
- Six telephone areas: see Telephone numbers in Slovenia

== See also ==
- Administrative divisions of Yugoslavia
