= Country codes of Serbia =

Identification codes

Country codes of Serbia are short alphanumeric identification codes with primary use in data processing and communications.

As Serbia and Montenegro dissolved in 2006, Serbia restored its independence and dealt with the issue of assignment of country codes.

== List of codes ==
Type	Registry	Code
ISO 3166-1 alpha-2 code	ISO	RS
ISO 3166-1 alpha-3 code	ISO	SRB
ISO 4217 currency code	ISO	RSD
International licence plate code	UNECE	SRB
Country code	ITU	+381
Country TLD code	ICANN	.rs

== Two-letter ISO 3166-1 alpha-2 ==
The task of assigning a two-letter ISO 3166-1 alpha-2 code for Serbia, which could seem trivial, was made hugely complex by the number of countries having names which begin with the letter S. All combinations of S as a first letter and any other letter in word Serbia, or even Srbija (in Serbian), were already taken by other states. As SB is a historic code for Serbia, it was hinted that the country could pursue talks with Solomon Islands, the current owner of that code. However, it is worth noting that since ISO 3166-1 requires that a code is unused for five years before it can be re-used, this may not be possible even with the consent of the ISO and the previous holder, as users of the standard may object. Some proposed solutions could have been "generic" SS or SX (although SS was likely to be avoided for its association with the Nazi Schutzstaffel), SS being later assigned to South Sudan and SX to Sint Maarten.

As this code is also to be used as Internet top-level domain for the country, there had been rumours of approaching either International Organization for Standardization, United Nations or one of the countries having names which begin with the letter S in order to switch the codes. Negotiating the purchase or usage of the .sj Internet domain reserved for Svalbard and Jan Mayen was not a plausible option as Norway, which administers this (through UNINETT Norid), has a policy of not commercializing or disposing of this domain.

The Government of Serbia made an official request that the alpha-2 code for Serbia should be RS (Republic of Serbia), but there was an ISO recommendation against any reference to the form of government in these codes. There are at least four examples where the rule against inclusion of government form was broken (Democratic Republic of the Congo has the code CD, Federated States of Micronesia has the code FM, Switzerland has the code CH that stems from country's official Latin name Confoederatio Helvetica, and the Democratic People's Republic of Korea has the code KP, despite the fact that the code KO is available). RS is also frequently used as an acronym for Republika Srpska, an entity of nearby Bosnia and Herzegovina; this is not a conflict but adds the potential for confusion. RS could also be an abbreviation for the historical name of today's Serbia, Raška or Rascia which would be in full compliance with this rule. The proposal, after an initial rejection by ISO, was accepted in September 2006.

== Three-letter ISO 3166-1 alpha-3 ==
The task of assigning an alpha-3 code was a somewhat less complex task than that of the alpha-2 code, the main issue being the choice between the English mnemonic SER or the Serbian SRB. A possible compromise between the two, SBA, was also mentioned.

The Institute for Standardisation of Serbia, in line with the proposed alpha-2 code (SP), decided that SPA should be the alpha-3 code for Serbia. The logic of this proposal was unclear, since this decision had not been elaborated by the Institute resulting in a public outcry and was amended by the Government of Serbia, which proposed SRB that is immediately recognizable and relatable to country itself by speakers of most European languages, including English. This was accepted by the ISO in September 2006.

== ISO 4217 ==
ISO 4217 code is used for national currency, in this case the Serbian dinar. This three-letter code is composed of, by rule, first two letters of the ISO 3166-1 alpha-2 and a third letter is initial of the currency itself: RSD. Exceptions from the rule are made only in the third letter, if that suits the country better, that is however not the Serbia's case.

== International licence plate code ==
Countries generally take on the shortest licence plate code possible. Abbreviation S was taken by Sweden the same year, making it unavailable for Serbia, while the "attractive" SR and SB were available, as Suriname uses SME, while the Solomon Islands are identified by SLB. The Kingdom of Serbia used SB from 1911 to 1919, when it was replaced by SHS, followed by Y, YU and SCG.

Government of Serbia, however, have decided that the international license plate code for Serbia should (and could only) be its ISO-3166-1 alpha-3 code, SRB.

== Telephone country code ==
Serbia kept the telephone country code previously assigned to Serbia and Montenegro, 381. Serbia and Montenegro received the code of 381 following the breakup of the Yugoslavia in 1992 (which had the country code 38). Montenegro switched to 382 after its independence in 2006, while previous Yugoslav country code 38 was divided as follows: 380 for Ukraine, 383 for Kosovo, 385 for Croatia, 386 for Slovenia, 387 for Bosnia and Herzegovina and 389 for North Macedonia.

== Country TLD code ==
Serbia and Montenegro used the .yu country code top-level domain when still called the Federal Republic of Yugoslavia. In September 2006 IANA assigned .rs as the top-level domain for Serbia.

Since 2011, there has been active .срб (abbreviation of Serbian: Србија; romanized as .srb), the internationalised (Cyrillic) country code TLD for Serbia.

== See also ==
- ISO 3166-2:RS
- Serbian dinar
- Vehicle license plates of Serbia
- Telephone numbers in Serbia
- .rs
- .срб
- National symbols of Serbia
