= NUTS statistical regions of North Macedonia =

Statistical regions of North Macedonia

As a candidate country of the European Union, North Macedonia (MK) is included in the Nomenclature of Territorial Units for Statistics (NUTS). The three NUTS levels are:

- NUTS-1: MK0 North Macedonia
- NUTS-2: MK00 North Macedonia
- NUTS-3: 8 Statistical regions
  - MK001 Vardarski
  - MK002 Istočen
  - MK003 Jugozapaden
  - MK004 Jugoistočen
  - MK005 Pelagoniski
  - MK006 Pološki
  - MK007 Severoistočen
  - MK008 Skopski

Below the NUTS levels, there are two LAU levels (LAU-1: municipalities; LAU-2: settlements).

== See also ==
- ISO 3166-2 codes of North Macedonia
- FIPS region codes of North Macedonia

== Sources ==
- Hierarchical list of the Nomenclature of territorial units for statistics - NUTS and the Statistical regions of Europe
- Overview map of CC (Candidate countries) - Statistical regions at level 1
  - Macedonia - Statistical regions at level 2
  - Macedonia - Statistical regions at level 3
- Correspondence between the regional levels and the national administrative units
- Municipalities of Macedonia, Statoids.com
