= Slovene =

Slovene or Slovenian may refer to:

- Something of, from, or related to Slovenia, a country in Central Europe
- Slovene language, a South Slavic language mainly spoken in Slovenia
- Slovenes, an ethno-linguistic group mainly living in Slovenia
- Slavic peoples, an Indo-European ethno-linguistic group
- Ilmen Slavs, the northernmost tribe of the Early East Slavs
