= ISO 3166-2:HU =

Entry for Hungary in ISO 3166-2

ISO 3166-2:HU is the entry for Hungary in ISO 3166-2, part of the ISO 3166 standard published by the International Organization for Standardization (ISO), which defines codes for the names of the principal subdivisions (e.g., provinces or states) of all countries coded in ISO 3166-1.

Currently for Hungary, ISO 3166-2 codes are defined for one capital city, 19 counties and 23 cities with county rights. The capital of the country Budapest has special status equal to the counties, while the cities with county rights, often called urban counties, have extended powers but are technically not independent of the counties.

Each code consists of two parts, separated by a hyphen. The first part is HU, the ISO 3166-1 alpha-2 code of Hungary. The second part is two letters.

== Current codes ==
Subdivision names are listed as in the ISO 3166-2 standard published by the ISO 3166 Maintenance Agency (ISO 3166/MA).

Click on the button in the header to sort each column.

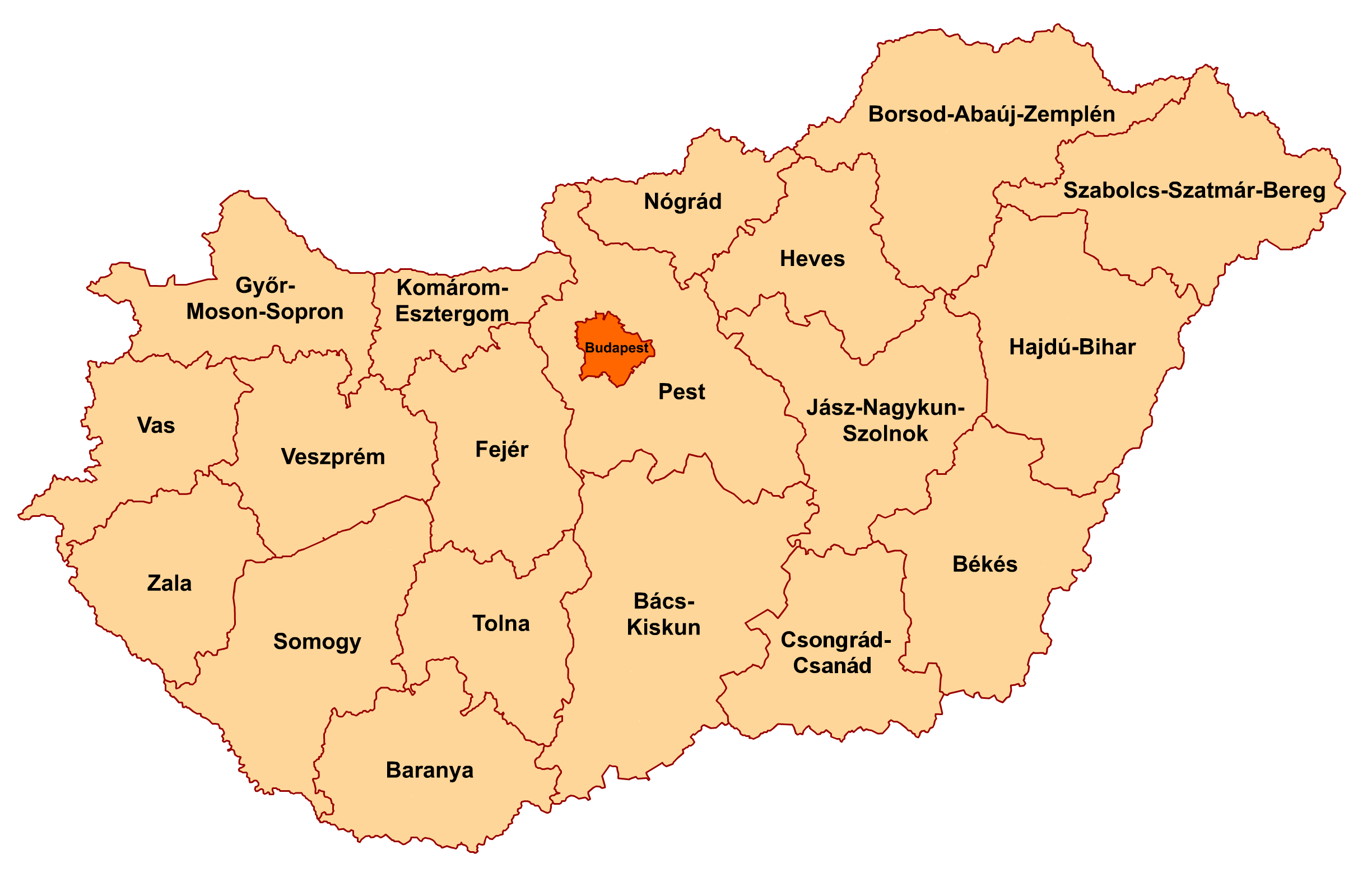
Map of the Hungarian counties.

Code	Subdivision name (hu)	Subdivision category
HU-BK	Bács-Kiskun	county
HU-BA	Baranya	county
HU-BE	Békés	county
HU-BC	Békéscsaba	city with county rights
HU-BZ	Borsod-Abaúj-Zemplén	county
HU-BU	Budapest	capital city
HU-CS	Csongrád-Csanád	county
HU-DE	Debrecen	city with county rights
HU-DU	Dunaújváros	city with county rights
HU-EG	Eger	city with county rights
HU-ER	Érd	city with county rights
HU-FE	Fejér	county
HU-GY	Győr	city with county rights
HU-GS	Győr-Moson-Sopron	county
HU-HB	Hajdú-Bihar	county
HU-HE	Heves	county
HU-HV	Hódmezővásárhely	city with county rights
HU-JN	Jász-Nagykun-Szolnok	county
HU-KV	Kaposvár	city with county rights
HU-KM	Kecskemét	city with county rights
HU-KE	Komárom-Esztergom	county
HU-MI	Miskolc	city with county rights
HU-NK	Nagykanizsa	city with county rights
HU-NO	Nógrád	county
HU-NY	Nyíregyháza	city with county rights
HU-PS	Pécs	city with county rights
HU-PE	Pest	county
HU-ST	Salgótarján	city with county rights
HU-SO	Somogy	county
HU-SN	Sopron	city with county rights
HU-SZ	Szabolcs-Szatmár-Bereg	county
HU-SD	Szeged	city with county rights
HU-SF	Székesfehérvár	city with county rights
HU-SS	Szekszárd	city with county rights
HU-SK	Szolnok	city with county rights
HU-SH	Szombathely	city with county rights
HU-TB	Tatabánya	city with county rights
HU-TO	Tolna	county
HU-VA	Vas	county
HU-VM	Veszprém	city with county rights
HU-VE	Veszprém	county
HU-ZA	Zala	county
HU-ZE	Zalaegerszeg	city with county rights

== Changes ==
The following changes to the entry have been announced by the ISO 3166/MA since the first publication of ISO 3166-2 in 1998:

Newsletter	Date issued	Description of change in newsletter	Code/Subdivision change
Newsletter II-2	2010-06-30	Update of the administrative structure and of the list source	Subdivisions added: HU-ER Érd
Online Browsing; Platform (OBP)	2021-11-25	Change of name of HU-CS; Update List Source	Subdivision renamed: HU-CS Csongrád → Csongrád-Csanád

== See also ==
- Subdivisions of Hungary
- FIPS region codes of Hungary
- NUTS codes of Hungary
- Neighbouring countries: AT, HR, RO, RS, SI, SK, UA
