= Statistical regions of Slovenia =

Administrative territorial regions of Slovenia

Statistical regions of Slovenia Statistične regije Slovenije (Slovene)
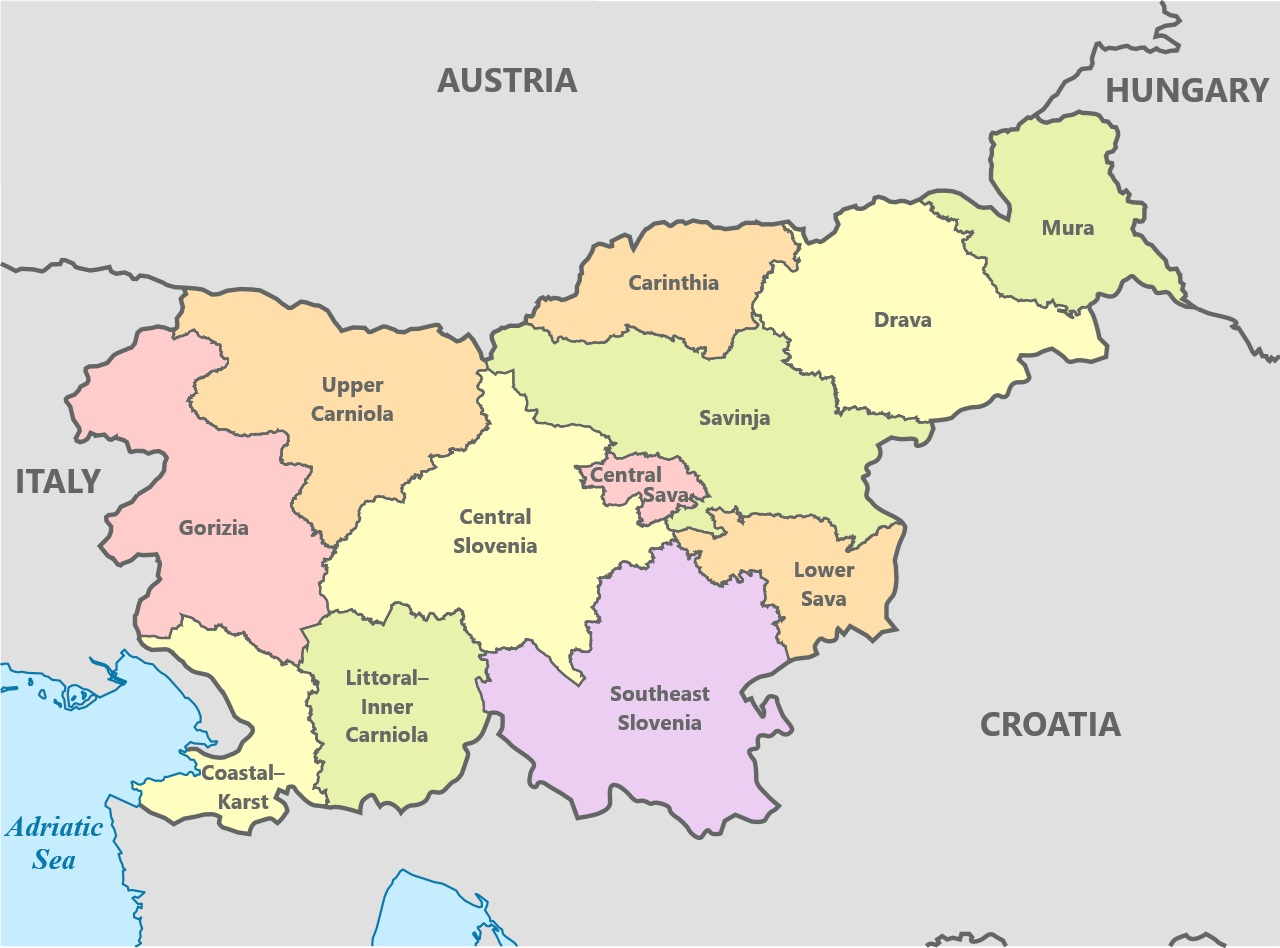
- Category: Unitary state
- Location: Slovenia
- Number: 12 statistical regions
- Populations: 57,083 (Central Sava) – 569,475 (Central Slovenia)
- Areas: 485 km^{2} (187 sq mi) (Central Sava) – 2,334 km^{2} (901 sq mi) (Southeast Slovenia)
- Government: Regional government, national government
- Subdivisions: Municipality

The statistical regions of Slovenia are 12 administrative entities created in 2000 for legal and statistical purposes.

== Division ==
By a decree in 2000, Slovenia has been divided into 12 statistical regions (NUTS-3 level), which are grouped in two cohesion regions (NUTS-2 level).

The statistical regions have been grouped into two cohesion regions are:

- Eastern Slovenia (Vzhodna Slovenija – SI01), which groups the Mura, Drava, Carinthia, Savinja, Central Sava, Lower Sava, Southeast Slovenia, and Littoral–Inner Carniola regions.
- Western Slovenia (Zahodna Slovenija – SI02), which groups the Central Slovenia, Upper Carniola, Gorizia, and Coastal–Karst regions.

Statistical regions
English name	Slovenian name	Code	Largest city	Area (km^{2})	Population (2025)
Mura	pomurska	SI011	Murska Sobota	1,337	113,172
Drava	podravska	SI012	Maribor	2,170	331,815
Carinthia	koroška	SI013	Slovenj Gradec	1,041	70,358
Savinja	savinjska	SI014	Celje	2,301	262,814
Central Sava	zasavska	SI015	Trbovlje	485	57,083
Lower Sava	posavska	SI016	Krško	968	75,993
Southeast Slovenia	jugovzhodna Slovenija	SI017	Novo Mesto	2,675	148,670
Littoral–Inner Carniola	primorsko-notranjska	SI018	Postojna	1,456	53,826
Central Slovenia	osrednjeslovenska	SI021	Ljubljana	2,334	569,475
Upper Carniola	gorenjska	SI022	Kranj	2,137	209,921
Gorizia	goriška	SI023	Nova Gorica	2,325	118,096
Coastal–Karst	obalno-kraška	SI024	Koper	1,044	119,627

== Sources ==
- Slovenian regions in figures 2014

== See also ==
- List of Slovenian regions by Human Development Index
- Municipalities of Slovenia
- Traditional regions of Slovenia
