= List of features on X =

X (formerly Twitter) is an American microblogging and social networking platform where registered users can share short messages in short posts, called tweets; like posts and repost (retweet) them, as well as read and respond to other user's public posts.

== Structure ==
=== Posts ===
Short posts, often called as tweets are publicly visible by default, but senders can restrict message delivery to only their followers. Users can also mute users they do not wish to interact with, block accounts from viewing their tweets and remove accounts from their followers list. Users can post via the X website, and may also subscribe other users known as "following" and subscribers are known as "followers" Individual posts can be forwarded by other users to their own feed, a process known as a repost─often called as a retweet. In 2015, Twitter launched "quote tweet" (originally called "retweet with comment"): a feature that allows users to add a comment to their retweets/reposts, nesting one post in the other. Users can also "like" (formerly "favorite") individual posts.

The counters for likes, reposts, and replies appear next to the respective buttons in news feeds, called timelines, such as on profile pages and search results. Counters for likes and reposts exist on a post's standalone page too. Since September 2020, quote post, formerly known as "quote tweets" and "retweet with comment" , have an own counter on their posts page. Until the legacy desktop front end that was discontinued in 2020, a row with miniature profile pictures of up to ten liking or reposting users was displayed (earliest documented implementation in December 2011 overhaul), as well as a reply counter next to the according button on a post's page.

X allows users to update their profile via their mobile phone either by text messaging or by apps released for certain smartphones and tablets. X has been compared to a web-based Internet Relay Chat (IRC) client. In a 2009 Time magazine essay, technology author Steven Johnson described the basic mechanics of Twitter as "remarkably simple":

As a social network, Twitter revolves around the principle of followers. When you choose to follow another user, that user's posts appear in reverse chronological order on your main Twitter page. If you follow 20 people, you'll see a mix of tweets scrolling down the page: breakfast-cereal updates, interesting new links, music recommendations, even musings on the future of education.

According to research published in April 2014, around 44% of user accounts had never tweeted.

The first tweet was created by Jack Dorsey, one of Twitter's co-founders, at 12:50 pm PST on March 21, 2006, and reads "just setting up my twttr". In 2009, the first tweet was sent from space. US astronauts Nicola Stott and Jeff Williams took part in a live 'tweetup' from the International Space Station with around 35 members of the public at the NASA Headquarters in Washington, D.C.

In March 2021, Jack Dorsey listed his first tweet for sale. The tweet was sold for $2.5 million, it was sold to a Malaysian businessman, Sina Estavi. Along with the metadata of the original post, the buyer was to receive a certificate that was digitally signed and verified by Dorsey.

==== Content ====
Content of tweets according to Pear Analytics: News (3.6%) Spam (3.8%) Self-promotion (5.9%) Pointless babble (40.1%) Conversational (37.6%) Pass-along value (8.7%)

San Antonio-based market-research firm Pear Analytics analyzed 2,000 tweets (originating from the United States and in English) over a two-week period in August 2009 from 11:00 am to 5:00 pm (CST) and separated them into six categories. Pointless babble made up 40%, with 38% being conversational. Pass-along value had 9%, self-promotion 6% with spam and news each making 4%.

Despite Jack Dorsey's own open contention that a message on Twitter is "a short burst of inconsequential information", social networking researcher Danah Boyd responded to the Pear Analytics survey by arguing that what the Pear researchers labeled "pointless babble" is better characterized as "social grooming" or "peripheral awareness" (which she justifies as persons "want[ing] to know what the people around them are thinking and doing and feeling, even when co-presence isn't viable"). Similarly, a survey of Twitter users found that a more specific social role of passing along messages that include a hyperlink is an expectation of reciprocal linking by followers.

==== Formats ====
===== Hashtags, usernames, retweets and replies =====
Users can group posts together by topic or type by use of hashtags – words or phrases prefixed with a "#" sign. Similarly, the "@" sign followed by a username is used for mentioning or replying to other users.

In 2014, in anticipation for the FIFA World Cup, Twitter introduced hashflags, special hashtags that automatically generate a custom emoji next to them for a certain period of time, following the success of a similar campaign during the 2010 World Cup. Hashflags may be generated by Twitter themselves (such as to raise awareness for social issues) or be purchased by corporations (such as to promote products and events).

To repost a message from another user and share it with one's own followers, a user can click the repost (formerly retweet) button within the post. Users can reply to other accounts' replies, Since November 2019, users can hide replies to their messages. Since May 2020, users can select who can reply each of their tweets before sending them: anyone, accounts who follow the poster, specific accounts, and none. This ability was upgraded in July 2021 to make the feature retroactively applicable to tweets after they have been sent out.

===== Using SMS =====
Through SMS, users can communicate with Twitter through five gateway numbers: short codes for the United States, Canada, India, New Zealand, and an Isle of Man-based number for international use. There is also a short code in the United Kingdom which is only accessible to those on the Vodafone, O2 and Orange networks. In India, since Twitter only supports posts from Bharti Airtel, an alternative platform called smsTweet was set up by a user to work on all networks. A similar platform called GladlyCast exists for mobile phone users in Singapore and Malaysia.

Tweets were set to a largely constrictive 140-character limit for compatibility with SMS messaging, introducing the shorthand notation and slang commonly used in SMS messages. The 140-character limit also increased the usage of URL shortening services such as bit.ly, goo.gl, tinyurl.com, tr.im, and other content-hosting services such as TwitPic, memozu.com and NotePub to accommodate multimedia content and text longer than 140 characters. Since June 2011, Twitter has used its own t.co domain for automatic shortening of all URLs posted on its site, making other link shorteners unnecessary for staying within Twitter's 140 character limit.

In August 2019, Jack Dorsey's account was hacked by using the Twitter SMS to post feature to send crude messages. Days later, the ability to send a tweet via SMS was temporarily turned off.

In April 2020, Twitter discontinued the ability to receive SMS messages containing the text of new tweets in most countries.

===== Character limits =====
In 2016, Twitter announced that media such as photos, videos, and the person's handle, would not count against the already constrictive 140 character limit. A user photo post used to count for a large chunk of a tweet, about 24 characters. Attachments and links would also no longer be part of the character limit.

On March 29, 2016, Twitter introduced the ability to add a caption of up to 480 characters to each image attached to a tweet. This caption can be accessed by screen reading software or by hovering the mouse above a picture inside TweetDeck.

Since March 30, 2017, Twitter handles are outside the tweet itself, therefore they no longer count towards the character limit. Only new Twitter handles added to the conversation count towards the limit.

In 2017, Twitter doubled their historical 140-character-limitation to 280. Under the new limit, glyphs are counted as a variable number of characters, depending upon the script they are from: most European letters and punctuation forms count as one character, while each CJK glyph counts as two so that only 140 such glyphs can be used in a .

===== URL shortener =====
t.co is a URL shortening service created by Twitter. It is only available for links posted to Twitter and not available for general use. All links posted to Twitter use a t.co wrapper. Twitter created the service to try to protect users from malicious sites by warning users if a URL is potentially malicious before redirecting them, and uses the shortener to track clicks on links within tweets.

Having used the services of third parties TinyURL and bit.ly, Twitter began experimenting with its own URL shortening service for private messages in March 2010 using the twt.tl domain, before it purchased the t.co domain. The service was tested on the main site using the accounts @TwitterAPI, @rsarver and @raffi. On September 2, 2010, an email from Twitter to users said they would be expanding the roll-out of the service to users. On June 7, 2011, Twitter announced that it was rolling out the feature.

t.co faced controversy under the ownership of Elon Musk, as Twitter began blocking new tweets from containing links to other social networks, such as Facebook, Instagram, and Mastodon. Tweets containing the networks could not be shared, and existing tweets with links to the restricted sites would give an error upon attempting to visit the page via Twitter. The policy was soon reversed after extreme controversy.

==== Trending topics ====
A word, phrase, or topic that is mentioned at a greater rate than others is said to be a "trending topic". Trending topics become popular either through a concerted effort by users or because of an event that prompts people to talk about a specific topic. These topics help Twitter and their users to understand what is happening in the world and what people's opinions are about it. Websites that track and display trending topics, like TwitterTrend.co, provide real-time information on the most discussed topics worldwide, offering users insights into regional and global trends.

Trending topics are sometimes the result of concerted efforts and manipulations by fans of certain celebrities or cultural phenomena, particularly musicians like Lady Gaga (known as Little Monsters), Justin Bieber (Beliebers), Rihanna (Rih Navy) and One Direction (Directioners), and novel series Twilight (Twihards) and Harry Potter (Potterheads). Twitter has altered the trend algorithm in the past to prevent manipulation of this type with limited success.

The Twitter web interface displays a list of trending topics on a sidebar on the home page, along with sponsored content (see image).

Twitter often censors trending hashtags that are claimed to be abusive or offensive. Twitter censored the #Thatsafrican and #thingsdarkiessay hashtags after users complained that they found the hashtags offensive. There are allegations that Twitter removed #NaMOinHyd from the trending list and added an Indian National Congress-sponsored hashtag. President Donald Trump protested trends calling them "unfair, disgusting, illegal, ridiculous" claiming the ones that are bad about him are blown up.

Examples of high-impact topics include the wildfires in San Diego, the earthquake in Japan, popular sporting events, and political uprisings in Iran and Egypt.

In 2019, 20% of the global trends were found to be fake, created automatically using fake and compromised accounts originating from Turkey. It is reported that 108,000 accounts were employed since 2015 to push 19,000 keywords such as advertisements and political campaigns, to top trends in Turkey by bulk tweeting.

==== Moments ====
In October 2015, Twitter introduced "Moments": a feature that allows users to curate tweets from other users into a larger collection. Twitter initially intended the feature to be used by its in-house editorial team and other partners; they populated a dedicated tab in Twitter's apps, chronicling news headlines, sporting events, and other content. In September 2016, creation of moments became available to all Twitter users.

On December 7, 2022, Twitter announced that it would be removing the ability to create new moments to focus on other experiences.

=== Adding and following content ===
There are numerous tools for adding content, monitoring content and conversations including Twitter's own TweetDeck, Salesforce.com, HootSuite, and Twitterfeed.com. As of 2009, fewer than half of tweets posted were posted using the web user interface with most users using third-party applications (based on an analysis of 500 million tweets by Sysomos).

=== Verified accounts ===
In June 2009, after being criticized by Kanye West and sued by Tony La Russa over unauthorized accounts run by impersonators, the company launched their "Verified Accounts" program. Twitter stated that an account with a "blue tick" verification badge indicates "we've been in contact with the person or entity the account is representing and verified that it is approved". In July 2016, Twitter announced a public application process to grant verified status to an account "if it is determined to be of public interest" and that verification "does not imply an endorsement". Verified status allows access to some features unavailable to other users, such as only seeing mentions from other verified accounts.

In November 2020, Twitter announced a relaunch of its verification system in 2021. According to the new policy, Twitter verifies six different types of accounts; for three of them (companies, brands, and influential individuals like activists), the existence of a Wikipedia page will be one criterion for showing that the account has "Off Twitter Notability". Twitter states that it will re-open public verification applications at some point in "early 2021".

=== Mobile ===
Twitter has mobile apps for iPhone, iPad, Android, Windows 10, Windows Phone, BlackBerry, and Nokia S40. Users can also tweet by sending SMS. In April 2017, Twitter introduced Twitter Lite, a progressive web app designed for regions with unreliable and slow Internet connections, with a size of less than one megabyte, designed for devices with limited storage capacity.

This has been released in countries with slow internet connection such as the Philippines.

Twitter Lite has evolved into the main Twitter web interface, see section "interface".

=== Third-party applications ===
For many years, Twitter has limited the use of third-party applications accessing the service by implementing a 100,000 user limit per application. Since August 2010, third-party Twitter applications have been required to use OAuth, an authentication method that does not require users to enter their password into the authenticating application. This was done to increase security and improve the user experience. As of 2023, third-party applications are prohibited under the Twitter API terms of service, with prohibit the use of the API to "create or attempt to create a substitute or similar service or product to the Twitter Applications".

=== Related headlines feature ===
This feature adds websites to the bottom of a tweet's permalink page. If a website embedded a tweet onto one of their stories, the tweet will show the websites that mentioned the tweet. This feature was added onto Twitter so if the viewer does not understand what the tweet means, they can click on the sites to read more about what the person is talking about.

=== Polls ===
In October 2015, Twitter began to roll out the ability to attach poll questions to tweets. Polls are open for up to 7 days, and voters are not personally identified.

Initially, polls could have only two options with a maximum of twenty characters per option. Later, in the following month of November 2015, the ability to add four options with up to 25 characters per option, was added.

=== Integrated photo-sharing service ===
On June 1, 2011, Twitter announced its own integrated photo-sharing service that enables users to upload a photo and attach it to a Tweet right from Twitter.com. Users now also have the ability to add pictures to Twitter's search by adding hashtags to the tweet. Twitter also plans to provide photo galleries designed to gather and syndicate all photos that a user has uploaded on Twitter and third-party services such as TwitPic.

=== Streaming video ===
In 2016, Twitter began to place a larger focus on live streaming video programming, hosting various events including streams of the Republican and Democratic conventions during the U.S. presidential campaign as part of a partnership with CBS News, Dreamhack and ESL esports events, and winning a bid for non-exclusive streaming rights to ten NFL Thursday Night Football games in the 2016 season.

During an event in New York in May 2017, Twitter announced that it planned to construct a 24-hour streaming video channel hosted within the service, featuring content from various partners. CEO Jack Dorsey stated that the digital video strategy was part of a goal for Twitter to be "the first place that anyone hears of anything going on that matters to them"; as of the first quarter of 2017, Twitter had over 200 content partners, who streamed over 800 hours of video over 450 events.

Twitter announced a number of new and expanded partnerships for its streaming video services at the event, including Bloomberg, BuzzFeed, Cheddar (Opening Bell and Closing Bell shows; the latter was introduced in October 2016) IMG Fashion (coverage of fashion events), Live Nation Entertainment (streaming concert events), Major League Baseball (weekly online game stream, plus a weekly program with live look-ins and coverage of trending stories), MTV and BET (red carpet coverage for their MTV Video Music Awards, MTV Movie & TV Awards, and BET Awards), NFL Network (the Monday-Thursday news program NFL Blitz Live, and Sunday Fantasy Gameday), the PGA Tour (PGA Tour Live coverage of early tournament rounds preceding television coverage), The Players' Tribune, Ben Silverman and Howard T. Owens' Propagate (daily entertainment show #WhatsHappening), The Verge (weekly technology show Circuit Breaker: The Verge's Gadget Show), Stadium (a new digital sports network being formed by Silver Chalice and Sinclair Broadcast Group) and the WNBA (weekly game).

=== Account archival ===
Twitter has offered two different methods of archiving one's own Twitter account data. Those methods have their individual benefits and disadvantages. As of September 2019, only the latter archival method is available.

==== Browsable legacy Twitter archive format ====
In December 2012, Twitter introduced a "Tweet archival" feature, which created a ZIP file that contains an offline-browsable archive of all tweets. Those exported tweets could be browsed and searched offline by using the bundled user-interface accessible through a web browser, which used client-side, JavaScript-powered pagination. The user interface of the tweet archive browser had a design similar to Twitter's 2010–2014 desktop user interface, even until the feature's removal. The tweet text contents, ID's, time data and source labels are located in the file called "tweets.csv". It was possible to request at least one archive per day. The ability to export this type of tweet archive, which never existed on the new layout, has been removed entirely in August 2019^{[when exactly?]}, after co-existing with the new 2018 data archival method. Even when accessing the legacy Twitter desktop website layout using the user-agent of an older browser version, the option has disappeared from the account settings.

=== Spaces ===
Twitter Spaces is a social audio feature that enables users to host or participate in a live-audio virtual environment called space for conversation. Spaces can accommodate an unlimited number of listeners. A maximum of 13 people (1 host, 2 co-hosts and 10 speakers) are allowed onstage. The feature was initially limited to users with at least 600 followers. Since October 21, 2021, any Twitter user can create a Space from the Android or iOS app.

=== Fleets ===
In March 2020, Twitter began to test a stories feature known as "fleets" in some markets, which officially launched on November 17, 2020. Similarly to equivalent features, fleets can contain text and media, are only accessible for 24 hours after they are posted, and are accessed within the Twitter app via an area above the timeline.

In June 2021, Twitter announced it would start implementing advertising into fleets, integrating full-screen ads among user-created content. On July 14, 2021, Twitter stated that it would remove Fleets by August 3. Twitter had intended for fleets to encourage more users to tweet regularly, rather than simply consume other folks' tweets, but instead fleets were generally used by users who already tweeted a lot. The company stated that their spot at the top of the screen would now be occupied by currently active Spaces from the user's feed.

=== X Premium (formerly Twitter Blue) ===
On June 3, 2021, Twitter announced a service known as Twitter Blue, which provides features exclusive to those who are subscribers to the Twitter Blue service. They include:

- Undo Tweet, which allows users to withdraw a tweet within a short time frame before it is posted.
- Bookmarks, which allows users to save individual tweets into folders.
- Reader mode, which converts threads of tweets into an article-like view.
- Color themes for the Twitter mobile app.
- Dedicated customer support.

The service was initially released in Australia and Canada. On November 9, 2021, Twitter Blue was launched for US customers.

With Twitter's rebranding to X in 2023, Twitter Blue was later renamed as X Premium.

=== Twitter Zero ===
Twitter Zero is an initiative undertaken by Twitter in collaboration with mobile phone-based Internet providers, whereby the providers waive data (bandwidth) charges—so-called "zero-rate"—for accessing Twitter on phones when using a stripped-down text-only version of the website. The images could be loaded by using the Twitter app. The stripped-down version is available only through providers who have entered the agreement with Twitter. Partners include:

- Nepal with Ncell.
- India with Reliance Communications.
- Uzbekistan with Ucell.
- Turkey with Turkcell.
- Philippines with Vodafone and Smart Communications.
- Indonesia with XL Axiata.

=== Tip Jar ===
In May 2021, Twitter began testing a Tip Jar feature on its iOS and Android clients. The feature allows users to send monetary tips to certain accounts, providing a financial incentive for content creators on the platform. The Tip Jar is optional and users can choose whether or not to enable tips for their account. The day the feature was launched, a user discovered that sending a tip through PayPal would reveal the sender's address to the recipient.

On September 23, 2021, Twitter announced that it will allow users to tip users on the social network with bitcoin. The feature will be available for iOS users. Previously, users could tip with fiat currency using services such as Square's Cash app and PayPal's Venmo. Twitter will integrate the Strike bitcoin lightning wallet service. It was noted that at this current time, Twitter will not take a cut of any money sent through the tips feature.

=== The Shop Module ===
In July 2021, Twitter launched a test of The Shop Module, a shopping extension that directs customers to a brand's products from its official Twitter account. The feature initially launched for US-based users only and only on iOS.

=== Safety Mode ===
On September 1, 2021, Twitter began to roll out Safety Mode, allowing users to reduce disruptive interactions. The rollout began with a small beta-feedback group on iOS, Android, and Twitter's web application.

The functionality allows users to temporarily block accounts for seven days when potentially harmful language is detected. If a user has Safety Mode enabled, authors of tweets that are identified by Twitter's technology as being harmful or exercising uninvited behavior will be temporarily unable to follow the account, send direct messages, or see tweets from the user with the enabled functionality during the temporary block period. Jarrod Doherty, senior product manager at Twitter, stated that the technology in place within Safety mode assesses existing relationships to prevent blocking accounts that the user frequently interacts with.

Twitter first revealed Safety Mode in February 2021 within the Analyst Day slide deck.

=== NFT digital assets ===
On September 23, 2021, Twitter revealed that it was experimenting with a feature that would allow users to authenticate and showcase their collections of NFT digital assets on the platform. The feature was added on January 20, 2022, allowing Twitter Blue subscribers to connect their cryptocurrency wallet to display an NFT they own as a hexagon-shaped profile picture.

The ability to set new NFT profile pictures was silently removed in January 2024.

=== Live shopping ===
On November 22, 2021, Twitter announced live shopping feature on its platform. Walmart will be the first retailer to test Twitter's new livestream shopping platform. The company stated that it is part of their continuing efforts to bring engaging experiences to customers that allow them to shop seamlessly while also being entertained.

=== Shops ===
Twitter allow companies to showcase up to 50 products for sale on their profiles, as part of new feature testing. Shops will help Twitter to gain a piece of the $45 billion US market for social commerce.

=== Community Notes ===
Logo of Community Notes

Community Notes (formerly known as Birdwatch) is a feature on X (formerly Twitter) where contributors can add context such as fact-checks under a post, image or video. It is a community-driven content moderation program, intended to provide helpful and informative context, based on a crowd-sourced system. Notes are applied to potentially misleading content by a bridging-based algorithm not based on majority rule, but instead agreement from users on different sides of the political spectrum.

The program launched on the platform in 2021 and became widespread in 2023. Initially shown to U.S. users only, notes were popularized in March 2022 over misinformation in the Russian invasion of Ukraine followed by COVID-19 misinformation in October. Birdwatch was then rebranded to Community Notes and expanded in November 2022. As of November 2023, it had approximately 133,000 contributors; notes reportedly receive tens of millions of views per day, with its goal being to counter propaganda and misinformation. According to investigation and studies, the vast majority of users do not see notes correcting content. In May 2024, a study of COVID-19 vaccine notes were deemed accurate 97% of the time.

=== Grok ===
Grok is a series of generative AI large language models developed by SpaceX Super Intelligence. It was launched in November 2023 by Elon Musk as an initiative based on the large language model (LLM) of the same name. Grok has apps for iOS and Android and is integrated with the X social network and Tesla's Optimus robot where it has chatbot functionality. Grok is named after the verb to grok, created by the American science fiction author Robert A. Heinlein to convey a form of deep, intuitive understanding.

SpaceX Super Intelligence has released several Grok models. Grok-1 was open-sourced in 2024, followed by Grok-2, Grok 3, and Grok 4 model families, with Grok 4.5 released in 2026. Different versions added capabilities including image generation, web search, "Think" mode to simulate reasoning,, agentic coding tool called Grok Build, and AI teammates called Grok Bot. Musk admitted in 2026 that Grok was partially distilled from OpenAI's GPT models. Starting with Grok 4.5, the models are co-developed with SpaceXSI subsidiary Cursor.

Grok also generates articles for the encyclopedia website Grokipedia, launched in October 2025 by Musk as an alternative to Wikipedia, which he described as "woke" and politically biased.

== See also ==
- Twitter usage: How various people and organizations use Twitter
