= Domain hack =

Domain name suggesting a word or phrase

A domain hack is a domain name that suggests a word, phrase, or name when concatenating two or more adjacent levels of that domain. For example, ro.bot and examp.le, using the domains .bot and .le, suggest the words robot and example respectively. In this context, the word hack denotes a clever trick (as in programming), not an exploit or break-in (as in security).

Domain hacks offer the ability to produce short domain names. This makes them potentially valuable as redirectors, pastebins and base domains from which to delegate subdomains and URL shortening services.

== History ==
On November 23, 1992, inter.net was registered. By the 1990s, several hostnames ending in pla.net were active. The concept of spelling out a phrase with the parts of a hostname to form a domain hack was well established by the mid-1990s. On Friday, May 3, 2002, Delicious registered icio.us to create del.icio.us. Delicious would later gain control of the delicio.us domain, which had been parked since April 24, 2002, the day the .us ccTLD (country code top-level domain) was opened to second-level registrations.

Who.is is a whois lookup service, indicating the registered ownership information of a domain. It was established June 12, 2002, and registered to an address in Reykjavík, Iceland.

The term domain hack was coined by Matthew Doucette on November 3, 2004, to mean "an unconventional domain name that uses parts other than the SLD (second level domain) or third level domain to create the title of the domain name."

== Examples ==
On January 14, 2004, the Christmas Island Internet Administration revoked .cx domain registration for shock site goatse.cx, a domain which used "se.cx" to approximate the word "sex" prior to the introduction of the .sex domain. The domain was originally registered in 1999. Similar names had been used for parody sites such as oralse.cx or analse.cx; in some cases, .cz (Czech Republic) or .kz (Kazakhstan) are substituted for .cx.

Yahoo! acquired blo.gs on June 14, 2005, and del.icio.us on December 9, 2005.

On September 11, 2007, name servers for .me were delegated by IANA to the Government of Montenegro, with a two-year transition period for existing .yu names to be transferred to .me. One of the first steps taken in deploying .me online was to create .its.me as a domain space for personal sites. Many potential domain hacks, such as love.me and buy.me, were held back by the registry as premium names for later auction.

On December 15, 2009, Google launched its now discontinued Google URL Shortener under the domain goo.gl using the ccTLD of Greenland. YouTube subsequently launched youtu.be using the ccTLD of Belgium. In 2015 Google used the domain hack abc.xyz for their newly launched Alphabet Inc.

Working with Bit.ly, The New York Times launched an URL shortener in late 2009 under the domain nyti.ms using the ccTLD of Montserrat. The need to serve shorter URLs for Twitter was cited as a reason for the shortener.

In March 2010, National Public Radio launched its own URL shortener under the domain n.pr using the ccTLD of Puerto Rico. The n.pr domain is currently used to link to an NPR story page by its ID and is one of the shortest possible domain hacks.

In late 2010, Apple launched a URL shortener at the domain itun.es, using the ccTLD of Spain, in a similar move to Google's goo.gl. Unlike goo.gl, which was public and could be used for any web address, itun.es is used only for iTunes Ping URL shortening.

Spotify also uses the URL Shortener spoti.fi, using the ccTLD of Finland, to link to artist, partners, playlists, albums and songs. Flickr uses flic.kr for their URL shortening, using the ccTLD of South Korea. ta.co redirects to Taco Bell's official website. In 2006, Red Bull GmbH registered the domain win.gs to use for shortened URLs. English words that end in ch can be hosted on the Swiss TLD (e.g., codesear.ch ("search"); freshte.ch ("tech"); swit.ch).

=== International examples ===
In most cases, registration of these short domain names relies on the use of country code top-level domains (ccTLDs), each of which has a unique two-letter identifier.

Some notable examples that include ccTLDs are:

- blo.gs makes use of the ccTLD .gs (South Georgia and the South Sandwich Islands) to spell "blogs"
- fa.st makes use of the ccTLD .st (São Tomé and Príncipe) to spell "fast"
- everyo.ne uses the ccTLD .ne (Niger) to spell "everyone" (and redirects to every.one as a double domain hack)
- instagr.am makes use of the ccTLD .am (Armenia) to spell the name of photo-sharing service "Instagram"
- darkvir.us uses ccTLD .us (United States) and sharing it for subdomains with free hosting
- Cityne.ws makes use of the ccTLD .ws (West Samoa) to spell the name of Italian newspaper "Citynews"
- tel.ly uses ccTLD .ly (Libya) to spell "telly" (a popular British colloquial term for television)
- some of Danbooru-style imageboards (booru) that end their name with '-booru' suffix may use the ccTLD .ru (Russia) to spell their own name.
- UNIVER.SArL - Domain hack for the word "UNIVERSAL". It uses the .sarl gTLD for limited liability companies in France.

Many people use domain hacks for their name to serve their personal website. Some prominent examples include: rome.ro (John Romero), melan.ie (Melanie C), sive.rs (Derek Sivers) and nav.al (Naval Ravikant). The Black Eyed Peas member will.i.am notably used his own stage name as the domain name itself, registering the domain i.am and using the subdomain will to form the complete domain name.

Domain hacking is not limited to single words. For example, helpmelearn.it uses the ccTLD for Italy to write out "help me learn it". While there is technically no restriction, these domain hacks tend to limit themselves to using only ccTLDs that are words, such as the aforementioned Italy as well as Iceland (.is) and Montenegro (.me).

The third-level domains del.icio.us, cr.yp.to and e.xplo.it make use of the SLDs icio.us, yp.to and xplo.it from the ccTLDs .us (United States), .to (Tonga) and .it (Italy) to spell "delicious", "crypto" and "exploit" respectively.

In some cases, an entire ccTLD has been re-purposed in its international marketing, such as .ai (Anguilla), .am (Armenia), .fm (Federated States of Micronesia), .cd (Democratic Republic of the Congo), .dj (Djibouti), and .tv (Tuvalu) for sites delivering various forms of audiovisual content.

Some feline-related websites, such as nyan.cat have used the .cat domain, which is meant for the Catalan linguistical community.

Libya's ccTLD (.ly) has been used for English words that end with suffix "ly", such as sil.ly or former musical.ly. Popular URL shortening services bit.ly, brief.ly, name.ly and ow.ly use this hack. In 2010, the Libyan registry suspended vb.ly, an adult oriented .ly link shortener.

After a legal fight to allow so, the Moldovan ccTLD (.md) has been used by doctors and medical companies due to its resemblance to the abbreviation MD, used by those holding a Doctor of Medicine degree. It has also been used by websites relating to the Markdown markup language (such as Obsidian, obsidian.md) which uses .md as its file extension.

=== Other languages ===
In Germany, Austria, and Switzerland, the domain .ag for Antigua and Barbuda is used by corporations in the legal form of Aktiengesellschaft (commonly abbreviated as AG).

The American Samoa domain .as is popular in countries where AS or A/S (Aktieselskab/Aksjeselskap) is the legal suffix for stock-based corporations, such as in Denmark and Norway, where such companies frequently employ it.

Some organisations situated in Switzerland use TLDs to specifically refer to their canton, such as the Belgian TLD .be for the Canton of Bern.

In a similar way, some organizations in the German state of Schleswig-Holstein use the .sh TLD from Saint Helena.

In Turkish, "biz" means "we", and can be used for emphasis at the end of "we are" sentences.

Family names in many Slavic languages written in internationalized variant end with -ch (i.e., -ich, -vich, -vych, -ovich). Therefore, the Swiss .ch ccTLD is an option.

Since the introduction of .eu domains (eu meaning "I" in Romanian, Galician and Portuguese), these domains have become popular in Romania, with people registering their names with the .eu extension. Before the .eus domain was introduced, .eu was also widely used by websites from the Basque Country, as it resembled the word Euskadi (meaning Basque Country).

In French, Italian and Portuguese, là or lá mean "there". As the .la domain (Laos) is available for second-level registration worldwide, this can be an easy way to get a short, catchy name such as "go there".

In Italy some TLDs are identical to Italian Provinces' identifier, such as .to (Turin) or .tv (Treviso) and are thus extensively used for web domains in the area. The Canadian domain .ca is also trivial to use as cá or cà ("here") respectively in Portuguese and Neapolitan, or ça ("that") in French; however, unlike some countries, Canada's .ca registrar requires local Canadian presence to use this domain.

Hungarian domains sometimes use the Moroccan top level domain .ma (ma meaning "today" in Hungarian).

A fad amongst French speakers was to register their domains in the Niue TLD .nu, which in French and Portuguese means "nude" or "naked"; however, as of 2007, Niue authorities have revoked many of these domain names. The handful that remain are joke domains without actual nudity. French speakers often use the Jersey TLD .je, since "je" means "I" in French. In addition, .je is used in the Netherlands, where it can mean both "you" or "your". The addition of -je to most nouns also produces a diminutive form (e.g., huis.je, or the defunct iPhone app feest.je (feestje meaning "party").

Likewise, Dutch, Swedish, and Danish speakers sometimes use .nu, because it means "now" in these languages. The TLD is still used by many Swedish sites, as prior to 2003 it was impossible for individuals (and difficult for organizations) to register arbitrary domains under the .se TLD.

English words that end with -rs (e.g., cars, fixers, powers) provide means for another popular domain hack which utilizes the Serbian .rs ccTLD.

In Russian, net (as нет, or nyet when transliterated character for character) means "no" or "there isn't," so there are many domains in the format something.net (e.g., redaktora.net meaning "[there is] no editor/redaktora").

Additionally in Russian, there are many words ending with -ga (Cyrillic: -га), including some that are highly popular (i.e., книга/kniga, meaning "book"; дорога/doroga, meaning "road"). Gabon's .ga domain is free for registration, which has led to wide adoption of such domain hacks.

In Czech, Polish and Slovak, to means "it", so there are many domains using Tonga's .to in the format do-something.to (e.g., zrobie.to, meaning "I will do it" in Polish; prestahujeme.to, meaning "We will move it" in Slovak). Notably, Czech file sharing service uloz.to was founded in 2007, and its name ulož to means "save it".

In Czech as well, se and si are particles marking reflexive verbs, and therefore Sweden's .se and Slovenia's .si have been used for domain hacks (e.g., svez.se, meaning "have a ride"; hraj.si, meaning "to play"), though the .si registry ARNES now restricts registration of domains by non-Slovenian entities.

In Slovenian, si is a dative form of the reciprocal personal pronoun and a second person form of the verb to be. As .si is a Slovenian ccTLD, domain hacks are abundant. Additionally, the domain is attractive to speakers of Romance languages, because it is a conjunction, pronoun or an affirmative interjection in many. ARNES limits the use of the domain to residents and entities of Slovenia.

In Spanish and Portuguese, -ar is the ending of the infinitive of many verbs, so hacks with Argentina's TLD .ar are common (e.g., educ.ar, meaning "to educate"). Similarly, another such verb suffix is -ir, TLD of Iran (see .ir).

One of the earliest commercial ISPs in Finland used the ccTLD .fi as sci.fi, a reference to science fiction.

In Kurdish, im means "I am", so it's possible to make meaningful domains for personal purposes with the Isle of Man TLD .im (e.g., rebaz.im, meaning "I am Rêbaz").

Some registries allow Emoji in domains, permitting the creation of emoji domains. Many browsers display these domains as punycode for security reasons.

With the rise of new TLDs, some companies have registered entire TLDs in order to create a hack for their name. Most prominent is .gle, created for Google to be used as goo.gle.

== See also ==
- Country code top-level domain
- Domain Name Hack Club (a listing of people with personal domain hacks)
- Generic top-level domain
