= .si =

Internet country code top-level domain for Slovenia

- Introduced: 1 April 1992
- TLD type: Country code top-level domain
- Status: Active
- Registry: ARNES
- Sponsor: Republic of Slovenia
- Intended use: Entities connected with Slovenia
- Actual use: Slovenian sites; Domain hacks; AI rebranded as "super intelligence"
- Registered domains: 186,159 (June 2026)
- Registration restrictions: None
- Structure: Registrations are taken directly at second level.
- Documents: SI TLD regulations
- Dispute policies: ADR
- Registry website: registry.si

.si is the Internet country code top-level domain (ccTLD) for Slovenia. It is administered by the ARNES, the Academic and Research Network of Slovenia. In 2010, the registry hosted 80,000 domain names. In 2012, that number increased to 100,000. In 2022 this number crossed 150,000.

== History ==
After becoming an independent country in the early 1990s, Slovenia sought its own country code top-level domain. The nation wanted .sl, but it had already been assigned to Sierra Leone.

== Domain hacks ==
Domain hacks for the .si TLD are quite popular, since si is second person singular of the verb 'to be' in Slovene and some other Slavic languages. As such, many domains have been created that are using such domain hacks, one of the most popular being zadovoljna.si ('You are pleased', feminine form).

Sí also translates from Spanish as yes, so the TLD has been used by some Spanish-language websites. A notable example of this is the Mexican political party MORENA, whose website is found at morena.si.

Italian party Sinistra Italiana (abbreviation: SI) also uses Slovenian domain for its website (sinistraitaliana.si).

Pepsi uses the URL shortening pep.si.

The video conferencing software Jitsi is hosted on jit.si.

In September 2026, the Trump administration in the United States announced it would replace the term artificial intelligence (AI) with super intelligence (SI). This led to a massive spike in .si domain registrations, amounting to over 6,000 new registrations in two days' time.

== Risk ==
According to a 2010 research by McAfee, the Slovenian TLD is the tenth most secure.
