= .ly =

Internet country-code top-level domain for Libya

- Introduced: 23 April 1997
- TLD type: Country code top-level domain
- Status: Active
- Registry: NIC.LY
- Sponsor: Libyan Post, Telecommunications and Information Technology Company
- Intended use: Entities connected with Libya
- Actual use: A smattering of sites with various connections, both Libyan and foreign; URL shortening e.g., bit.ly
- Registered domains: 15,156 (16 October 2017)
- Registration restrictions: Third-level sub-domains have varying restrictions
- Structure: Registrations have been made directly at the second level as well as at the third level beneath various second level labels
- Documents: Regulations
- DNSSEC: Yes (since 2021)
- Registry website: www.nic.ly

.ly is the Internet country code top-level domain (ccTLD) for Libya.

== Registration ==
A .ly registration is the process of registering a user domain name within the ccTLD for Libya. The .ly domain, introduced in 1997, is administered by the registry LYNIC on behalf of the Libyan Post, Telecommunications and Information Technology Company (formerly the General Post and Telecommunication Company). This domain is mainly for the use of the general public of Libya.

LYNIC appoints recognized registrars to offer .ly domain names, and these registrars perform all the domain registration tasks on behalf of LYNIC. Libya Telecom & Technology (ltt.ly) is one of those that offer .ly domains to companies and organizations. Sub-domains are also provided within the .ly domain, at the second and third levels beneath various second levels.

According to the registration site, registered .ly domain names must not be "obscene, scandalous, indecent, or contrary to Libyan law or Islamic morality".

LYNIC registers domain names on a first-come, first-served basis. Applicants may apply for domains with a registration fee of $75 for each domain. Before registration, the domain name, company name, trademark registration, and other legal documents must be provided. In addition, the .ly domain names being registered should not violate any rules set forth by the registrar. Domain names may be registered for a minimum of one year.

Applicants may register domains online or through the official registrars list. After completing the registration process, an email is sent to the applicant's billing contact address. The .ly domain name becomes active within a few minutes of that email notification.

=== Second-level domains ===
The second-level domains which are open to third-level registrations are:

- .com.ly — commercial services
- .net.ly — Internet-related services
- .gov.ly — government and ministries
- .plc.ly — state-owned companies
- .edu.ly — educational and training institutions
- .sch.ly — schools
- .med.ly — health-related services
- .org.ly — non-profit organizations
- .id.ly — individuals.

Strings shorter than four symbols long are to be registered only through Libya Telecom and Technology to guarantee that registrants have local presence.

== History ==
IANA delegated registration authority for .ly to Khalil Elwiheishi at the Alshaeen for Information Technology in April 1997.

During the weekend of 20 August 2011 at the start of the Battle of Tripoli, the main nic.ly registration site appeared to have been defaced by hackers on the side of the National Liberation Army, though other sites such as bit.ly remained unaffected.

== Domain hacks ==
Many Libyan domains were reserved for English words that end with the suffix "-ly", such as name.ly, musical.ly (now TikTok) and sincere.ly, so-called domain hacks. As the annual fee for .ly domains remains high ($75 a year), many domain names remain available on the domain prime market, and some popular ones can be bought on the domain secondary market, the result of the domain name speculation.

In May 17, 2008 until 2011. Bitly registered the site: bit.ly, Then in September 13, 2009, Bitly was launched as a URL shortening service.

In October 2010, the domain of "sex-positive" URL shortening service vb.ly, which had been registered in 2009 by American journalist Violet Blue and Ben Metcalfe, was seized by the Libyan web authorities for not being compliant with the law of Libya. A Libya Telecom spokesman stated to Blue: "Pornography and adult material aren't allowed under Libyan Law ... Therefore, we removed the domain." According to one blogger, as of 2014 this was the only known domain seized by nic.ly, and it was seized only after several failed attempts to contact the registrant.
