= Violet Blue =

American writer

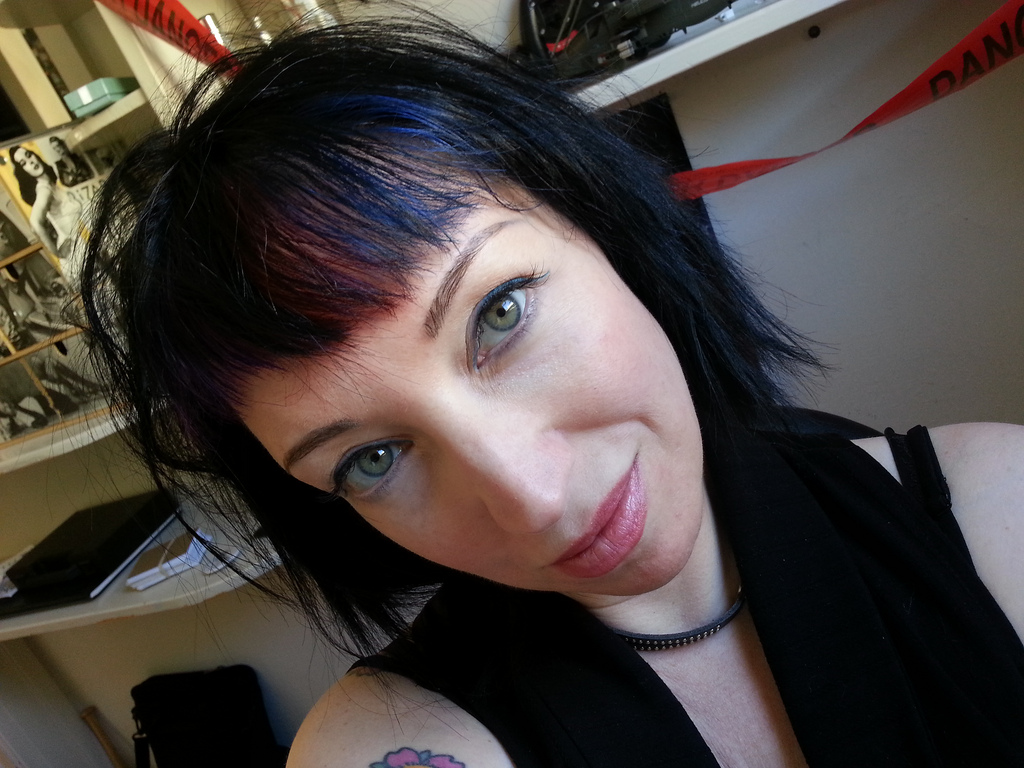
- Violet Blue
- Born: September 22
- Occupations: Journalist for CBS Interactive and blogger
- Writing career
- Genres: Technology, harm reduction, sex education, erotica
- Notable awards: IPPY Erotica category, 2006 and 2007 (twice)
- Website: tinynibbles.com

Violet Blue is an American journalist, author, editor, advisor, and educator.

Blue wrote a weekly sex column for the San Francisco Chronicle until 2010. In her podcast, Open Source Sex, she reads erotica and discusses topics such as fetishes and oral sex.

== Awards ==
- In January 2007, Forbes named her one of The Web Celeb 25.
- Blue was named "Best Sex Educator" in 2013 by the San Francisco Weekly.

== Name ==
Violet Blue is the author's legal name. In an online article, she has stated:

My name really is Violet Blue. Despite any rubbish you’ve seen by my harassers and detractors, Violet Blue is the name on my passport, social security card, all my ID, and it is who I am.

On August 19, 2011, Blue's Google+ account was suspended for failing to comply with the Google+ real name policy, but this decision was reversed three days later.

== Litigation ==
In October 2007, Blue filed a lawsuit against adult actress Ada Mae Johnson, who had performed as "Violet Blue" since 2000, alleging that Johnson had adopted Blue's persona, and her recently trademarked (in 2007) name, "Violet Blue." She said she had been using the name in writings since 1999. The lawsuit alleged trademark violation and dilution, as well as unfair business practices. Pursuant to a preliminary injunction and court order granted in 2007 to cease using "names, trademarks and Internet domains confusingly similar to, or identical to, Plaintiff's trademark VIOLET BLUE," Johnson changed her stage name to Noname Jane. The lawsuit was settled in October 2008.

In July 2008, Blue sought restraining orders against online critics David Burch (aka Ben Burch) and Nina Alter to prohibit them from e-mailing her, editing her Wikipedia page, or writing unkindly about her online. Both motions were dismissed but she is allowed to file again.

== Boing Boing deletions ==
Around June 2008, Blue stated on her blog that the blog Boing Boing had removed all posts referring to her (estimated by a Los Angeles Times blogger to number at least 70) from the site. A heated debate ensued after a brief statement on the Boing Boing site regarding this action stated: "Violet behaved in a way that made us reconsider whether we wanted to lend her any credibility or associate with her. It's our blog and so we made an editorial decision, like we do every single day". Boing Boing editor Xeni Jardin said that she hoped she would not have to make the reasons public.

== vb.ly URL shortener ==
In August 2009, Violet Blue and Ben Metcalfe launched a URL shortening service with the domain name vb.ly, which was described as "the Internet's first and only sex-positive URL shortener." The site was hosted on the .ly top-level domain, and the main page showed Violet Blue holding a bottle of beer. In October 2010, the site was shut down following a letter to Violet Blue from Libya Telecom & Technology, saying that the site was contrary to the principles of Sharia law and stating: "The issue of offensive imagery is quite subjective, as what I may deem as offensive you might not, but I think you'll agree that a picture of a scantily clad lady with some bottle in her hand isn't exactly what most would consider decent or family friendly at the least." Ben Metcalfe responded by stating, "We're very clear that the site did not have pornographic or adult content hosted on it; but even if it did, my bigger concern is that the domain registry is trying to regulate against the content of a website. A domain and a website are two extricably decoupled and separate entities."

== Selected works ==
=== Authored ===
- A Fish Has No Word For Water: A Punk Homeless San Francisco Memoir, Digita Publications, 2023, ISBN 978-0-9862266-7-0
- How to Be a Digital Revolutionary, Violet Blue (self-published), 2017, ISBN 978-1-52133-828-5
- The Smart Girls Guide to Privacy, Digita Publications, 2014, ISBN 0-9799019-9-5
- The Ultimate Guide to Cunnilingus: How to Go Down on a Woman and Give Her Exquisite Pleasure, 2nd Edition, Cleis Press, 2010, ISBN 1-57344-387-5
- The Ultimate Guide to Fellatio: How to Go Down on a Man and Give Him Mind-Blowing Pleasure, 2nd Edition, Cleis Press, 2010, ISBN 1-57344-398-0
- The Adventurous Couple's Guide to Strap-On Sex, Cleis Press, 2007, ISBN 1-57344-278-X
- The Smart Girl's Guide to the G-Spot, Cleis Press, 2007, ISBN 1-57344-273-9
- Fetish Sex: An Erotic Guide for Couples, Daedalus Publishing Company, 2006, ISBN 1-881943-23-2 - with Thomas Roche
- The Adventurous Couple's Guide to Sex Toys, Cleis Press, 2006, ISBN 1-57344-254-2
- The Smart Girl's Guide to Porn, Cleis Press, 2006, ISBN 1-57344-247-X (IPPY Bronze award winner for erotica)
- The Ultimate Guide to Sexual Fantasy: How to Turn Your Fantasies into Reality, Cleis Press, 2004, ISBN 1-57344-190-2
- The Ultimate Guide to Adult Videos: How to Watch Adult Videos and Make Your Sex Life Sizzle, Cleis Press, 2003, ISBN 1-57344-172-4
- The Ultimate Guide to Cunnilingus: How to Go Down on a Woman and Give Her Exquisite Pleasure, Cleis Press, 2002 ISBN 1-57344-144-9
- The Ultimate Guide to Fellatio: How to Go Down on a Man and Give Him Mind-Blowing Pleasure, Cleis Press, 2002, ISBN 1-57344-151-1

=== Edited ===
- Sweet Life: Erotic Fantasies for Couples, Cleis Press, 2001, ISBN 978-1-57344-133-9
- Sweet Life 2: Erotic Fantasies for Couples, Cleis Press, 2003, ISBN 978-1-57344-167-4
- Taboo: Forbidden Fantasies for Couples, Cleis Press, 2004, ISBN 978-1-57344-186-5
- Best Sex Writing 2005, Cleis Press, 2005, ISBN 978-1-57344-217-6
- Best Women's Erotica 2006, Cleis Press, 2005, ISBN 978-1-57344-223-7 (IPPY winner for Erotica)
- Best Women's Erotica 2007, Cleis Press, 2006, ISBN 978-1-57344-258-9 (IPPY Gold winner for Erotica)
- Lust: Erotic Fantasies for Women, Cleis Press, 2007, ISBN 978-1-57344-280-0
- Lips Like Sugar: Women's Erotic Fantasies, Cleis Press, 2007, ISBN 978-1-57344-232-9
- Best Women's Erotica 2008, Cleis Press, 2007, ISBN 978-1-57344-299-2
- Best Women's Erotica 2009, Cleis Press, 2008, ISBN 978-1-57344-338-8
- Girls on Top: Explicit Erotica for Women, Cleis Press, 2009, ISBN 978-1-57344-340-1
- Best Women's Erotica 2010, Cleis Press, 2009, ISBN 978-1-57344-373-9
- Best Women's Erotica 2011, Cleis Press, 2010, ISBN 978-1-57344-423-1

=== Digital releases ===
- Sweet Heat (erotica), Digita Publications, 2008 (audiobook), ISBN 978-0-9799019-6-6
- Erotic Role Play: A Guide For Couples, Digita Publications, 2007 (audiobook, ebook), ISBN 978-0-9799019-5-9
- How To Kiss, Digita Publications, 2007 (audiobook, ebook, and Amazon Kindle versions), ISBN 978-0-9799019-2-8
- The Modern Safer Sex Guide, Digita Publications, 2007 (ebook and Amazon Kindle versions), ISBN 978-0-9799019-4-2
- Creatures of the Night (erotica), Digita Publications, 2007 (audiobook and ebook and Amazon Kindle versions), ISBN 978-0-9799019-3-5
- Pleasure Zone Basics, Digita Publications, 2007 (audiobook), ISBN 978-0-9799019-1-1

== See also ==
- Sex-positive feminism
