= Proposed top-level domains =

Generic top-level domains

The Domain Name System of the Internet consists of a set of top-level domains that constitute the root domain of the hierarchical name space and database. Due to the growth of the Internet, it became desirable to expand the initial set of six generic top-level domains in 1984. As a result, new top-level domain names have been proposed for implementation by ICANN. Such proposals included a variety of models ranging from the adoption of policies for unrestricted gTLDs that could be registered by anyone for any purpose, to chartered gTLDs for specialized uses by specialized organizations. In October 2000, ICANN published a list of proposals for top-level domain strings it had received.

== Geographic proposals ==
- .geo – Generic geographical locations.
- .toronto – was proposed by City of Toronto officials.

== Internationalized country code top-level domains ==
The following ccTLDs (country code top-level domains) have been requested using a procedure known as the Internationalized Domain Name (or IDN) ccTLD Fast Track Process.

DNS name	IDN ccTLD	Country	Transliteration	Script	ccTLD	Year of application
xn--wgv71a	.日本	Japan	Nippon or Nihon	Kanji (both Kyūjitai and Shinjitai)	.jp	2008
xn--vcst06ab2a	.日本国	Japan	Nippon-koku or Nihon-koku	Kanji (Shinjitai)	.jp	2012
xn--mgbb7fyab	ليبيا.	Libya	Lībyā	Arabic	.ly	

The following countries have national languages that use other scripts than Latin but have no internationalized country code top-level domain, and none proposed in the above list:

- Afghanistan
- Bhutan
- Cambodia
- Cyprus
- Eritrea
- Ethiopia
- North Korea
- Kyrgyzstan
- Lebanon
- Maldives
- Myanmar
- Nepal
- Tajikistan

== Language and community ==
These proposals are centered on creating an independent Internet identity for linguistic and cultural communities. They are mostly inspired by the success of the .cat domain created for websites in the Catalan language or about the Catalan culture.

Domain name	Intended use	Sponsor	Year of Proposal	Comments
~~.cym~~	Welsh language and Wales	dotCYM Cyf	2006	It was proposed by dotCYM for Welsh language and Wales, but ICANN has reserved this for eventual assignment to the Cayman Islands. See also .cymru and .wales.
.eng	England	DotEng	2008	The DotEng.org website was set up by John Sewell of Maidenhead in Berkshire. Mentioned in PC Pro Online: Campaign begins for .eng domain, Stuart Turton, 23 April 2008
.ker	Cornish language and Cornwall	Cornish World Magazine	2008	Proposed domain name derived from "Kernow"
.lli	Leonese language and culture	puntuLLI	2007	Several companies, associations, organizations, and institutions are involved in this campaign.
.nai	Native, Aboriginal, and Indigenous peoples of the Americas	nai	1999	The original proposal for a Native American managed TLD predates ICANN, and its form was adopted by ICANN as the "sponsored" type of application and eventual contract in the 2001 new gTLD round. .nai's mission is to implement a top-level name space with an indigenous policy, provide an alternative to the several thousand indigenous public administrations, and the larger numbers of indigenous non-governmental, linguistic and cultural institutional, public and private economic enterprises, bands and individuals in the Western Hemisphere currently using name spaces operated under for-profit or colonial policies, and promote the economic development of Indian Country.
~~.sco~~	Scotland	dotSCO	2005	dotSCO began in late 2005 and has been campaigning to build support for a new TLD from among the Scots community around the world. The campaign now appears to be defunct, effectively replaced by now-approved .scot.
.sic	Székely Land	Pontsic Foundation	2009	pontSIC began in late 2008 and has been campaigning to build support for a new TLD from among the Székely community around the world. The campaign was started by the Szekler National Council, and now are involved several companies and institutions. As of September 2009 there are over 33,200 signatories.

- Note: The dotCYMRU, dotEUS, dotSCOT and dotBZH formed the ECLID, the European Cultural and Linguistic Internet Domains umbrella group to lobby for the successful and speedy application for the bids. It is no longer active.

== Technical domain name themes ==
- .mail – A domain for e-mail networks, proposed to facilitate fighting e-mail spam.
- .web – A domain for general use on the World Wide Web.

== Blockchain and Web3 domain systems ==
In addition to traditional ICANN-regulated proposals, several projects have introduced top-level domains that operate on decentralized networks rather than the Domain Name System (DNS). These so-called Web3 or blockchain domains use distributed ledgers or smart contracts to register and resolve names, independent of ICANN governance.

Several Web3 registrars, such as Freename, Unstoppable Domains, and the Ethereum Name Service, have marketed blockchain-based top-level domains that mimic or extend conventional naming conventions. One example is the proposed .prompt domain, associated with Freename, which was mentioned in industry press following a United States intent-to-use trademark filing in August 2025. Although such Web3 domains function outside the DNS root, their growing visibility has prompted discussion about potential coexistence or conflict between decentralized naming systems and ICANN-governed namespaces.

== See also ==
- List of Internet top-level domains
- Generic top-level domain – New top-level domains
