= Address =

Information that locates a structure

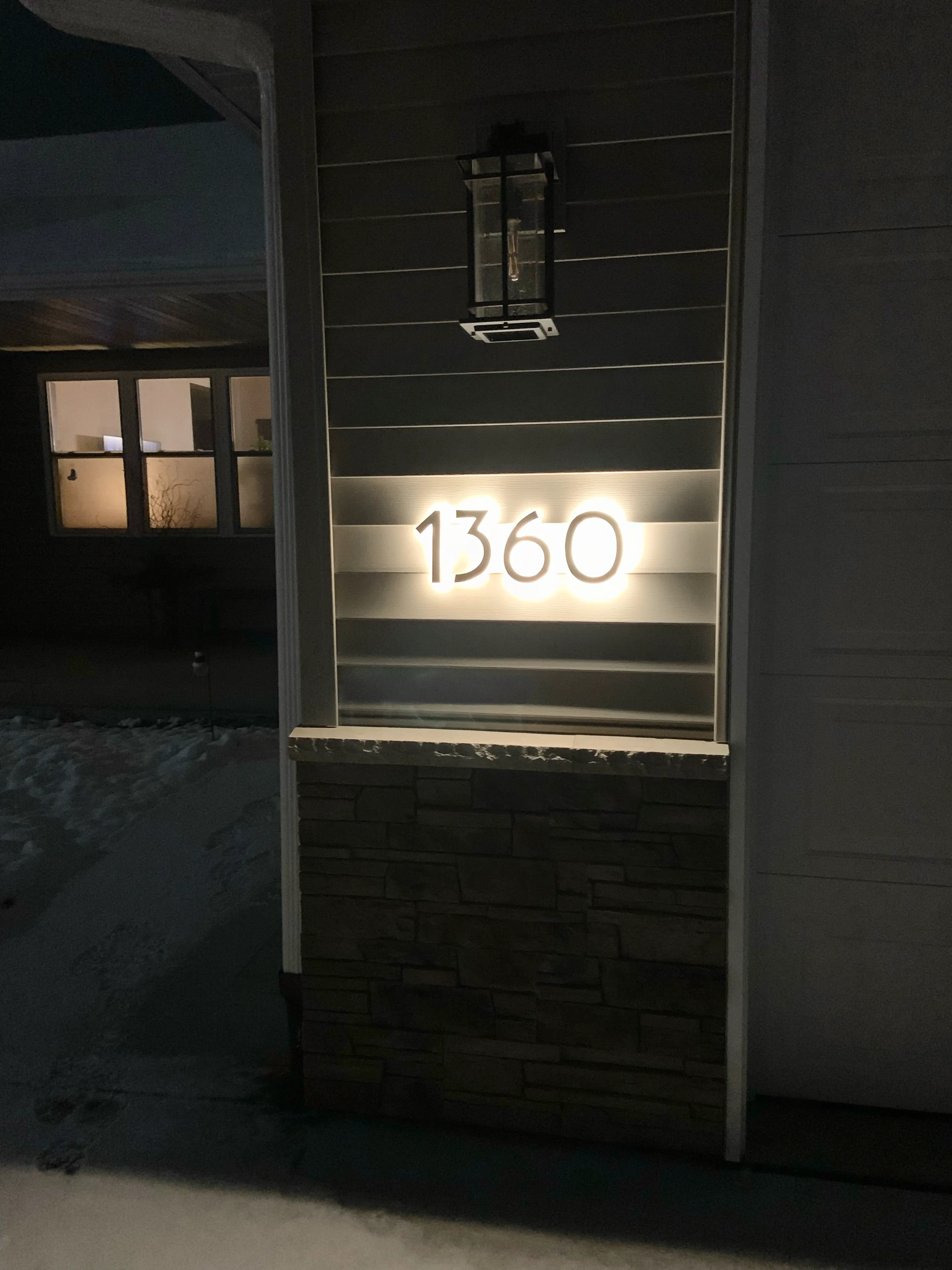
Illuminated address

An address is a collection of information, presented in a mostly fixed format, used to give the location of a building, apartment, or other structure or a plot of land, generally using political boundaries and street names as references, along with other identifiers such as house or apartment numbers and organization name. Some addresses also contain special codes, such as a postal code, to make identification easier and aid in the routing of mail.

Addresses provide a means of physically locating a building. They are used in identifying buildings as the end points of a postal system and as parameters in statistics collection, especially in census-taking and the insurance industry. Address formats are different in different places, and unlike latitude and longitude coordinates, there is no simple mapping from an address to a location.

== History ==
Until the 18th and 19th centuries, most houses and buildings were not numbered. In London, one of the first recorded instances of a street being numbered was Prescot Street in Goodman's Fields in 1708. Street naming and numbering began under the age of Enlightenment, also as part of campaigns for census and military conscription, such as in the dominions of Maria Theresa in the mid 18th century. Numbering allowed the efficient delivery of mail, as the postal system evolved in the 18th and 19th centuries to reach widespread usage.

In London, house numbering was not regulated until the Metropolis Management Act 1855, which granted the newly formed Metropolitan Board of Works the power to control street naming and numbering. Under pressure from the Post Office, the board began simplifying addresses in 1857, tackling the most confusing streets and assigning district codes, like EC (Eastern Central) and WC (Western Central), which laid the foundation for the postcode system. Postcodes, as we know them, were only introduced in the 1960s-1970s. Despite some public resistance to changing street names and numbers, by 1871, over 4,800 street names had been altered, and 100,000 houses renumbered in London. Though house numbering took time to become widely accepted, it eventually became firmly established.

Comprehensive addressing of all buildings is still incomplete, even in developed countries. For example, the Navajo Nation in the United States was still assigning rural addresses as of 2015 and the lack of addresses can be used for voter disenfranchisement in the USA. In many cities in Asia, most minor streets were never named, and this is still the case today in much of Japan. Over a third of addresses in Ireland shared their address with at least one other property at the time of the Eircode's introduction in 2015.

Land registration systems, known as cadastres, helped manage property ownership in Ancient Rome, especially as Rome expanded. The city was divided into 14 regions (regiones) by Emperor Augustus to streamline administration, which became the foundation for locating properties.

== Current addressing schemes ==
=== House numbering or naming ===
In most English-speaking countries, the usual method of house numbering is an alternating numbering scheme progressing in each direction along a street, with odd numbers on one side (often west or south or the left-hand side leading away from a main road) and even numbers on the other side, although there is significant variation on this basic pattern. Many older towns and cities in the UK have "up and down" numbering where the numbers progress sequentially along one side of the road, and then sequentially back down the other side. Cities in North America, particularly those planned on a grid plan, often incorporate block numbers, quadrants (explained below), and cardinal directions into their street numbers, so that in many such cities, addresses roughly follow a Cartesian coordinate system. Some other cities around the world have their own schemes.

Although house numbering is the principal identification scheme in many parts of the world, it is also common for houses in the United Kingdom and Ireland to be identified by name, rather than number, especially in villages. In these cases, the street name will usually follow the house name. Such an address might read: "Smith Cottage, Frog Lane, Barchester, Barsetshire, BZ9 9BA" or "Dunroamin, Emo, Co. Laois, Ireland" (fictional examples).

=== Quadrants ===
In cities with Cartesian-coordinate-based addressing systems, the streets that form the north–south and east–west dividing lines constitute the x and y axes of a Cartesian coordinate plane and thus divide the city into quadrants. The quadrants are typically identified in the street names, although the manner of doing so varies from city to city. For example, in one city, all streets in the northeast quadrant may have "NE" prefixed or suffixed to their street names, while in another, the intersection of North Calvert Street and East 27th Street can only be in the northeast quadrant.

=== Street-naming conventions ===
Street names may follow a variety of themes. In many North American cities, such as San Francisco, USA, and Edmonton, Alberta and Vancouver, British Columbia, streets are simply numbered sequentially across the street grid. Numbered streets originated in the United States in Philadelphia by Thomas Holme, who laid out the original plan for the city in 1683. Washington, D.C. has its numbered streets running north–south and lettered or alphabetically named streets running east–west, while diagonal avenues are typically named after states. In Salt Lake City, and many other Utah cities, streets are in a large grid and are numbered in increments of 100 based on their location relative to the center of the city in blocks. A similar system is in use in Detroit with the Mile Road System. In some housing developments in North America and elsewhere, street names may all follow the same theme (for example, bird species), or start with the same letter. Streets in Continental Europe, the Middle East, and Latin America are often named after famous people or significant dates.

=== Postal codes ===
Postal codes are a relatively recent development in addressing, designed to speed the sorting and processing of mail by assigning unique numeric or alphanumeric codes to each geographical locality.

=== Postal alternatives to physical addresses ===
For privacy and other purposes, postal services have made it possible to receive mail without revealing one's physical address or even having a fixed physical address. Examples are post office boxes, service addresses and poste restante (general delivery).

== Address format ==
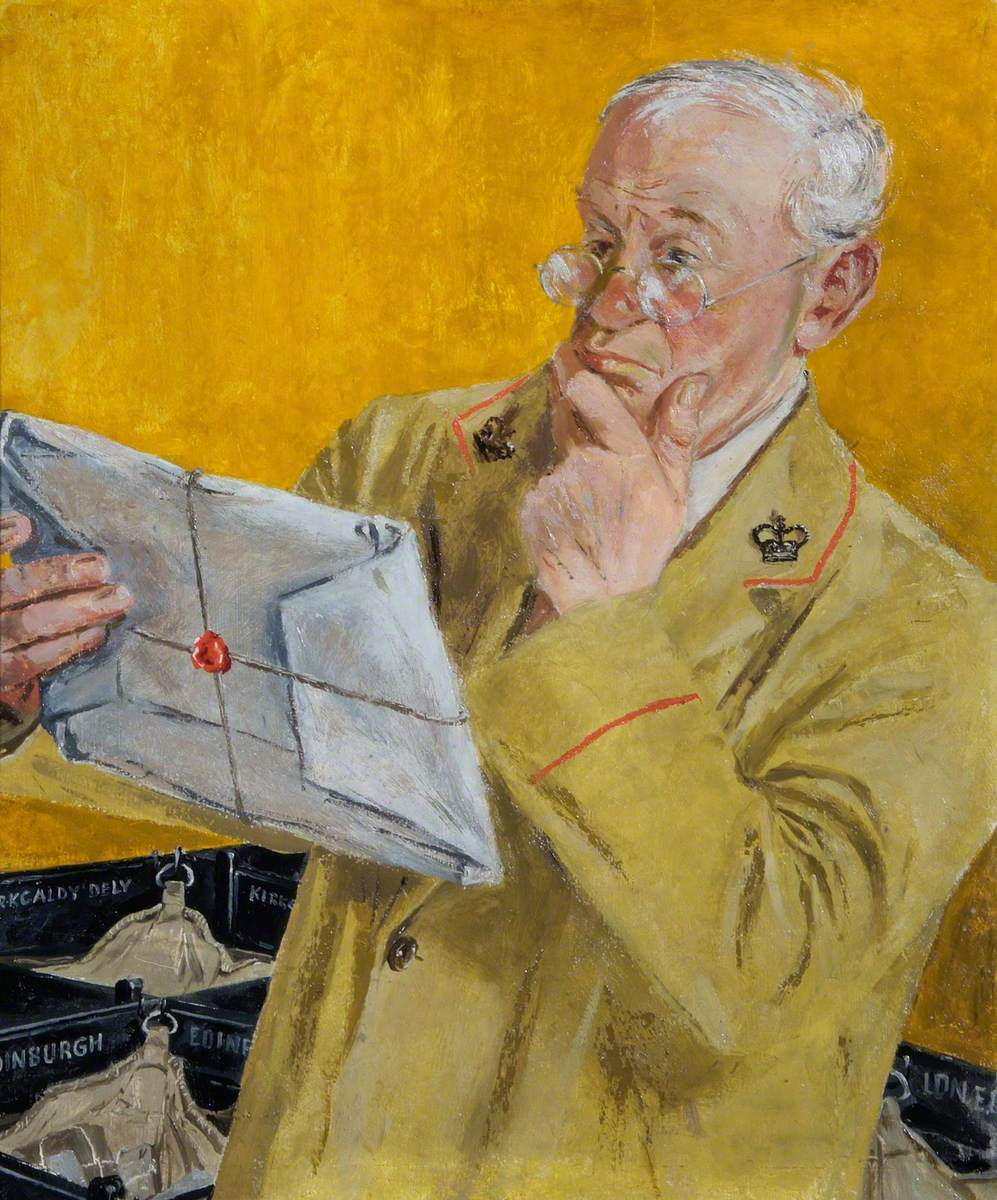
Write Your Address Clearly, public service poster, James Fitton (1958)

In most of the world, addresses are written in order from most specific to general, i.e. finest to coarsest information, starting with the addressee and ending with the largest geographical unit. For example:

Format	Example
Name of recipient Company name Street number, name City area/District; City/Town/Village; County; Postal code Country (in French or English)	Mr A. Payne; ARAMARK Ltd. 30 Commercial Road; Fratton; PORTSMOUTH; Hampshire; PO1 1AA; UNITED KINGDOM

In English-speaking countries, the postal code usually comes last. In much of Europe, the code precedes the town name, thus: "1010 Lausanne". Sometimes, the ISO 3166 country code is placed in front of the postal code: "CH-1010 Lausanne".

If a house number is provided, it is written on the same line as the street name; a house name is written on the previous line. When addresses are written inline, line breaks are replaced by commas. Conventions on the placing of house numbers differ: either before or after the street name. Similarly, there are differences in the placement of postal codes: in the UK, they are written on a separate line at the end of the address; in Australia, Canada and the United States, they usually appear immediately after the state or province, on the same line; in Austria, Belgium, France, Germany and The Netherlands they appear before the city, on the same line.

East Asian addressing systems, including Chinese, Japanese, Korean, and Taiwanese addressing systems, when written in their native scripts, use the big-endian order, from the largest geographical area to the smallest geographical area, followed by the recipient's name. However, both have the same order as Western countries when written in the Latin script. The Hungarian system also goes from large to small units, except that the name of the addressee is put into the first line.

The Universal Postal Convention strongly recommends the following:

"The addressee's address shall be worded in a precise and complete manner. It shall be written very legibly in roman letters and Arabic numerals. If other letters and numerals are used in the country of destination, it shall be recommended that the address be given also in these letters and numerals. The name of the place of destination and the name of the country of destination shall be written in capital letters together with the correct postcode number or delivery zone number or post office box number, if any. The name of the country of destination shall be written preferably in the language of the country of origin. To avoid any difficulty in the countries of transit, it is desirable for the name of the country of destination to be added in an internationally known language. Designated operators may recommend that, on items addressed to countries where the recommended position of the postcode is in front of the name of the location of destination, the postcode should be preceded by the EN ISO 3166-1 alpha-2 country code followed by a hyphen. This shall in no way detract from the requirement for the name of the destination country to be printed in full."

== See also ==
- Delivery point
- Fire sign (address)
- Geocode
- Handwritten Address Interpretation (HWAI)
- Human geography
- Japanese addressing system
- National Land and Property Gazetteer
- service d'adresse mondial (sedamo) or worldwide address service
