= Kevin Gilbertson =

American web developer

Kevin Gilbertson is an American web developer best known as the creator of TinyURL, launched in January 2002. TinyURL is a URL shortener, a web service that provides short aliases for redirection of long URLs.

According to Wired, Gilbertson had been riding unicycles since childhood, and created TinyURL to convert postings on unicycling newsgroups into Web pages (since fewer people know their way around newsgroups than the Web). Google's AdSense links covered operating costs.

Gilbertson, known by friends as "Gilby," lives in Mexico with his wife. He learned about computers from his father, a software engineer, with whom he also rides unicycles as part of the Twin Cities Unicycle Club.
