= .li =

Internet country code top-level domain for Liechtenstein

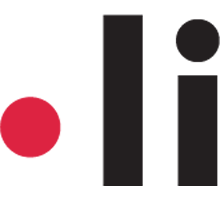
- Introduced: 26 February 1993
- TLD type: Country code top-level domain
- Status: Active
- Registry: SWITCH Teleinformatics Services
- Sponsor: University of Liechtenstein
- Intended use: Entities connected with Liechtenstein
- Actual use: Popular in Liechtenstein; gets some other uses on websites about lithium
- Registered domains: 70,587 (2022-12-15)
- Registration restrictions: None
- Structure: Registrations are made directly at second level
- DNSSEC: yes
- Registry website: www.nic.li

.li is the Internet country code top-level domain (ccTLD) for Liechtenstein. The .li TLD was created in 1993. The domain is sponsored and administered by the University of Liechtenstein in Vaduz. Registration of .li domain names used to be managed by SWITCH, administrator of Switzerland's .ch ccTLD. In February 2013, SWITCH discontinued its .li registration service for private customers, delegating it to a number of recognized partner firms.

There are no requirements to apply for the extension. Registrations of internationalized domain names have been accepted since March 2004. Domain names under 3 characters are reserved for the state and its institutions.

== Domain hacks and vanity usage ==
Some Long Island organizations and companies have adopted the .li TLD as a domain hack.

As -li is a diminutive ending in Swiss German (Standard German -lein), many Swiss companies register an additional, or alternative, .li domain for their businesses and services.

In Russian, -li is a verbal ending of past tense plural form. That is why some Russian-oriented sites use it as a part of the site name with the verbal stem before the dot.

Li is also a Romanization of the second most common Chinese surname. Some people with this last name register .li domains for personal use.

In Toki Pona, the word li marks the following word as a verb, resulting in some Toki Pona websites using the domain, such as nimi.li, an online dictionary.
