= G.co =

URL shortener used by Google for its websites

g.co is the top-level domain URL shortcut for Google, as announced on July 18, 2011. According to Gary Briggs, Google's Vice President of consumer marketing, the .co purchase was to help users of the shortened domain, "always end up at a page for a Google product or service."
