= Slovenian Internet Exchange =

Internet exchange point in Slovenia

- Full name: Slovenian Internet Exchange
- Abbreviation: SIX
- Location: Ljubljana, Slovenia
- Website: https://www.six.si/en/home
- Members: 35
- Peak: 180 Gbit/s
- Daily (avg.): 53 Gbit/s

Slovenian Internet Exchange (SIX) is a Slovenian internet exchange point.

As of January 2025, the SIX interconnects 35 Internet service providers in two locations in Ljubljana, one being in Jožef Stefan Institute and secondary in Ljubljana Technology Park. They are managed by the Academic and Research Network of Slovenia. SIX's average weekly traffic is 52 Gbit/s reaching peaks over 100 Gbit/s making it the most significant exchange point in Slovenia.

== See also ==
- List of Internet exchange points by size
