= Noname Jane =

American pornographic film actress

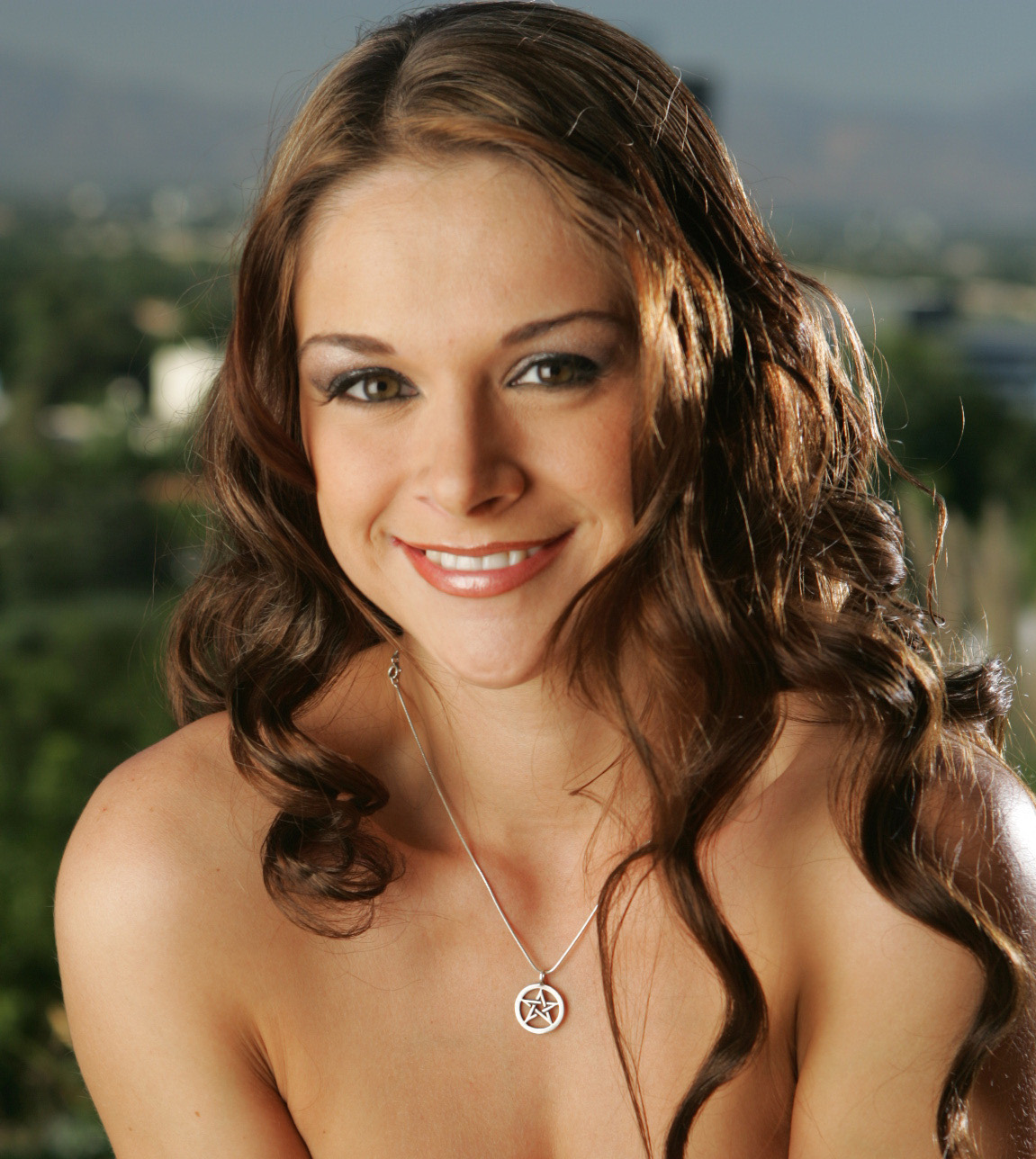
- Jane in 2006
- Other name: Violet Blue
- Occupation: Pornographic film actress

Noname Jane is an American pornographic film actress.

In the majority of the pornographic films in which she appeared, she used the stage name Violet Blue. In October 2007, a lawsuit brought by the author Violet Blue charged that Jane had adopted the author's name and persona, prompting Jane to change her stage name to Noname Jane, in response to an injunction in the case.

== Early life ==
Jane began studying magick and witchcraft at the age of 16 and was initiated into Ordo Templi Orientis, a Thelemic religious organization, at age 21.

== Career ==
In January 2009, Jane announced on her Myspace blog that she would resume working with male talent. In August 2010, Jane announced on her MySpace blog that she would only be performing with one male actor, Dick Danger, and that, in spite of her earlier announcement, she had not subsequently worked with any other male talent.

== Trademark infringement issue ==
In October 2007, author Violet Blue filed a federal lawsuit charging that Jane had adopted her name and persona. The court issued a preliminary injunction that forced Jane to stop using the name "Violet Blue" or anything confusingly similar; the stage name Noname Jane was adopted instead.

== Awards and nominations ==
- 2002 AVN Award winner - Best New Starlet

== See also ==
- List of Thelemites
- Members of Ordo Templi Orientis
