= .swiss =

Internet top-level domain for Switzerland

- Introduced: 2015
- TLD type: Generic top-level domain
- Status: Active
- Registry: dot.swiss
- Sponsor: Federal Office of Communications (OFCOM)
- Intended use: Swiss institutions and businesses
- Registration restrictions: Requires a "registered place of business and a physical administrative base in Switzerland"
- Structure: Registrations at second level (ie. domain.swiss)
- Documents: https://www.icann.org/resources/agreement/swiss-2014-10-16-en
- DNSSEC: TBA
- Registry website: https://dot.swiss/en/

.swiss is a top-level domain (TLD) for Switzerland. It was approved by ICANN as a TLD on 16 Oct 2014. This is meant to supplement the traditional .ch TLD.

The Federal Office of Communications (OFCOM) began registering .swiss domains as of 7 September 2015. Open registration to other legal entities begins from 11 January 2016.
