= Libyan Post, Telecommunications and Information Technology Company =

Libyan state-owned holding company

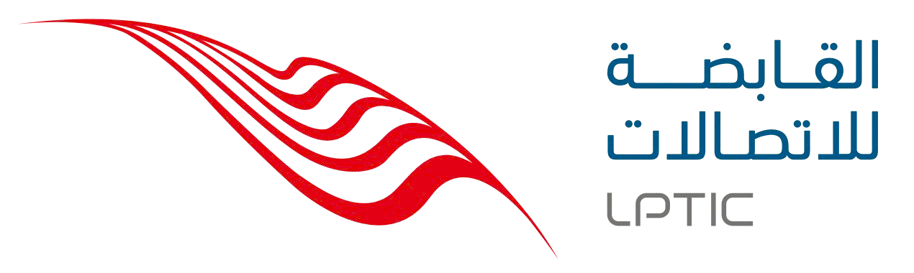
- Native name: الشركة القابضة للاتصالات
- Type: State-owned enterprise
- Industry: Telecommunication; Mail; Technology
- Predecessor: General Posts and Telecommunications Company
- Founded: 2005 in Tripoli, Libya
- Founder: Cabinet of Libya
- Headquarters: Tripoli, Libya
- Areas served: Argentina; Canada; Cote D'Ivoire; Italy; Libya; Mauritius; United Arab Emirates; United Kingdom; Saudi Arabia
- Subsidiaries: Al-Bunya Investment & Services Company; Libya Post; Hatif Libya; The Libyan International Telecom Company; Aljeel Aljadeed; Almadar Aljadid; Libya Telecom & Technology; Libyana
- Website: lptic.ly

The Libyan Post, Telecommunications and Information Technology Company (LPTIC; Arabic: الشركة القابضة للاتصالات) is a Libyan state-owned holding company established in accordance with the Prime Minister's resolution number (63) for the year 2005 to be the owner of major communications companies.

== Subsidiaries ==
=== Al-Bunya Investment & Services Company ===
The company has been established upon a decision from the Secretary of the Board of Directors of LPTIC. The Company activities are investment, building, construction, own, maintain and operate the infrastructure facilities of the main and branch networks for the provision of telecommunications services.

=== Libya Post ===
Libya Post Company is a Libyan joint stock company having its legal personality and independent financial liability. In 2019 it was given permission to start the first phase of Libya's postcode project that has been decades in the making. It is affiliated to the LPITC. Libya Post was admitted into Universal Postal Union membership on 24 October 2013.

=== Hatif Libya ===
The company has been established upon a decision from the Secretary of the Board of Directors of LPTIC, No. (4) for year 2008, for purposes of operation and maintenance of the State systems and the development of a national phone network. In 2016 Hatif Libya had 1,374,408 subscribers.

=== Libyan International Telecom Company ===
The Libyan International Telecom Company is one of LPTIC subsidiaries, established in 2008 to take over the management of all ports, international contacts in Libya and to meet the needs of the international communications of the other subsidiaries, whether telephony or data services.

=== Aljeel Aljadeed ===
The establishment of Aljeel Aljadeed Company was to contribute in improvement and development of the telecommunications local market, transfer & resettlement of modern technologies in the field of communications and to enable the company to compete locally and internationally, by providing all services integrated communications services, fixed line and mobile and internet services, television broadcasting and next generation network services.

=== Libya Telecom & Technology (LTT) ===
Libya Telecom & Technology (LTT) is a Libyan government-owned company based in Tripoli, Libya. As the country's most used service provider, LTT accounts for much of Libya's internet penetration, largely thanks to its DSL, Fiber, FWA and 4G services.

=== AlMadar AlJadid ===
AlMadar AlJadid is a government owned mobile network operator and data provider based in Tripoli, Libya.

=== Libyana Mobile Phone ===
Libyana Mobile Phone is a government owned mobile network operator and a data provider based in Tripoli, Libya.
