= Libyana =

Libyana Mobile Phone
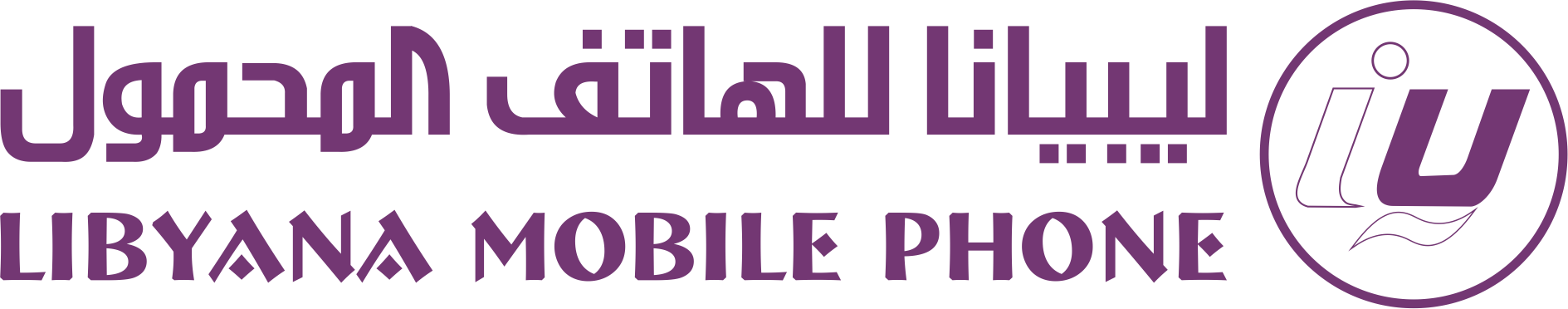
- Company type: Public
- Industry: Prepaid mobile phone operator
- Founded: September 2004
- Headquarters: Tripoli, Libya
- Key people: CEO Mohamed Ibrahim Ben Ayad
- Products: 2G, 3G, 4G, VoLTE, 5G(testing)
- Number of employees: 800+
- Parent: State-owned via LPTIC
- Website: www.libyana.ly

Libyana Mobile Phone (Arabic: ليبيانا للهاتف المحمول) is a Libyan mobile phone company established in 2004. It is one of the two major mobile phone operators State-owned via LPTIC. The company holds the largest share of the market, with over 6.3 million subscribers across government institutions, businesses, and individuals. It recently expanded its services to include 4G+ and VoLTE coverage in most Libyan cities and is currently testing 5G technology.

== Libyana Network Technology ==
- GSM-900, GSM-1800
- 2G (GPRS, EDGE)
- 3G (HSPA, HSPA+)
- 4G (LTE, LTE-A, VoLTE)
