= Addresses in South Korea =

South Korean address system based on street names

Addresses in South Korea are used to identify specific locations within the country. South Korea has replaced its land lot-based address system with one based on street names.

The switching of the address system is to make it easier for foreigners as well as Koreans to find their destinations.

The current official system, the Road Name Address system rolled out on July 29, 2011, uses street names and building numbers, and is similar to the systems used by the United States, Canada, Australia and Europe. The previous system was the land-lot based address, which is also used in Japan, but not within the Mandarin-speaking world.

The old land-lot addressing system has been officially decommissioned since December 31, 2013.

== Street address system ==
The current system used in South Korea is similar to that used by most countries around the world.

=== Street names ===
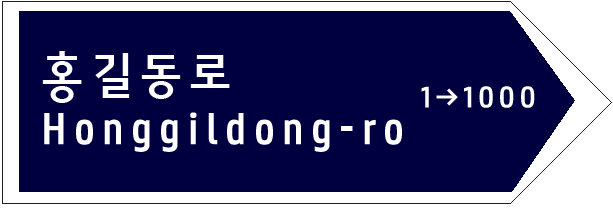

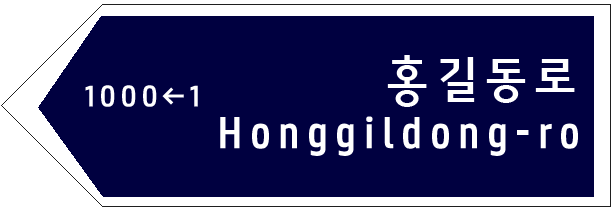

Starting point/Ending point

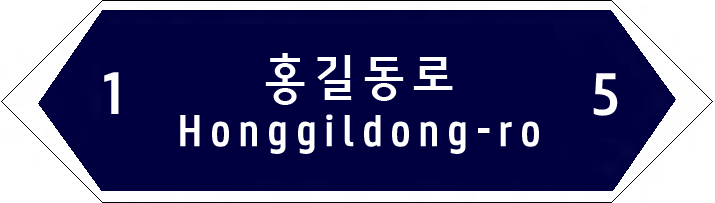

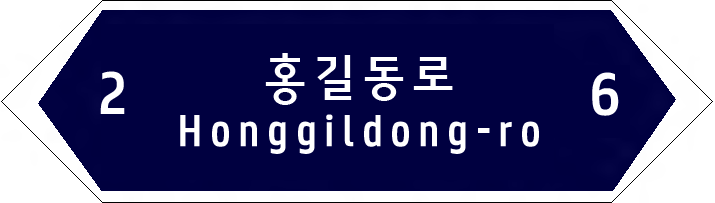

Crossing (left and right)

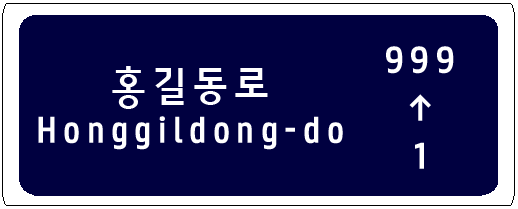

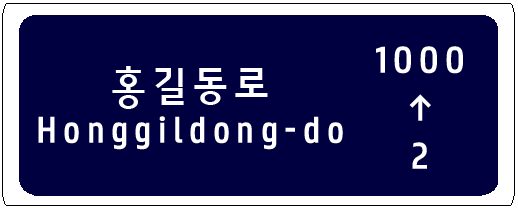

Forward

Korean streets have names typically ending in -daero (대로, 大路, Blvd.), -ro (로, 路, Rd.) or -gil (길, 街, St.) and they are distinguished by width: -daero (over 8 lanes), -ro (2~7 lanes) and -gil (others).

Some streets, mainly -daero and -ro, may be named after a feature in the area such as Daehak-ro (대학로, University Street) near a university, or after the neighborhood (dong) in which they lie such as Hyehwa-ro (혜화로, Hyehwa Street) which lies in Hyehwa-dong. Street names may be unique, or, in a convention which may seem confusing to foreigners, the same name can be re-used for several streets in the same area, with each street having a unique number.

Other streets, mainly -gil, may be named after the street name it diverges from with a systematic number. There are three different types of numbering rules: basic numbering, serial numbering, and other numbering. The purpose of numbering streets is to make their geographic location easier to predict.

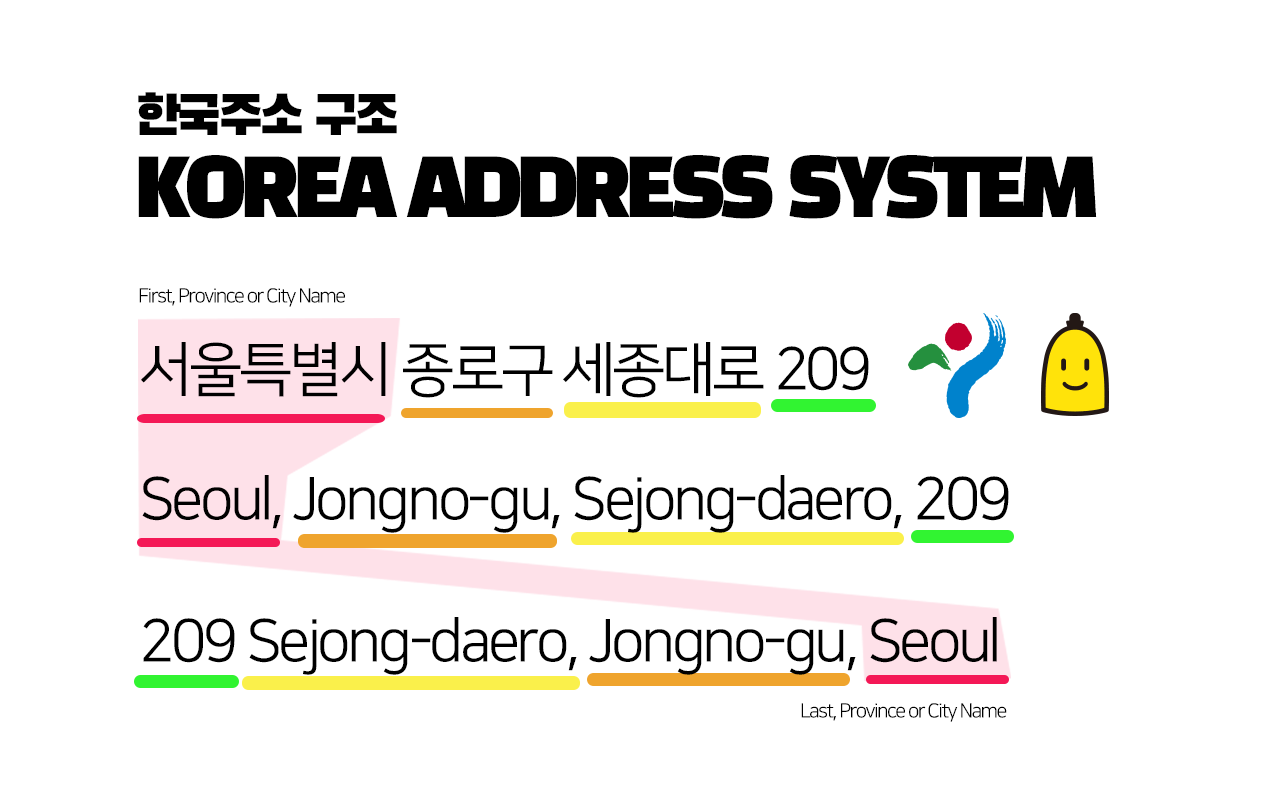
Korea Address System

First, by basic numbering, which is used in most of Gyeonggi Province, a number is assigned to -gil diverging from -daero or -ro based on the basic number of the position diverging from -daero or -ro. Since the basic number increases by 2 every 20 meters, the basic number multiplied by 10 meters comes to the distance from the start point of the street to the current position. For example, Nongol-ro 10beon-gil (논골로10번길) indicates that the street diverges from Nongol-ro (논골로) and the diverging position is about 100 meters away from the start point of Nongol-ro. Since 10 is an even number, the street is on the right side of Nongol-ro. Note that basic numbered street names have beon-gil (번길) after their numbers, which indicates basic number.

Second, by serial numbering, which is used in Seoul, a serial number is assigned to -gil diverging from -daero or -ro, based on -daero or -ro number order. For example, if a street is the first one among streets diverging from Daehak-ro, it becomes Daehak-ro 1-gil (대학로1길). If a street is fourth among streets diverging from Daehak-ro, it becomes Daehak-ro 4-gil (대학로4길). Since 4 is even number, the street towards right side of Daehak-ro. Note that serial numbered street names do not have beon after their numbers, which indicates serial number.

Third, by other numbering, a serial number is assigned to -ro or -gil reflecting local characteristics.

Streets diverging from -gil are named after -gil with the diverging -gil with the additional number in Korean alphabet: ga (가), na (나), da (다), ra (라), ma (마) ... For example, the third diverging street of Daehak-ro 4-gil (대학로4길) would be Daehak-ro 4da-gil (대학로4다길). This secondary diverging numbering is applied to all of the numbering rules.

=== Building number ===
Building number is based on basic number, a virtual number that increases by 2 every 20 meters along a street with odd numbers on the left side and even numbers on the right side, as in most European countries. The building number is assigned to the basic number of a position of the main gate adjacent to the street. For example, if a building has three entrances and the main one is adjacent to Sejong-ro 2-gil, and its position is about 30m away from the start point of the left side of Sejong-ro 2-gil, the building number would be 3, and the road name address of the building will be 3, Sejong-ro 2-gil (세종로2길 3).

Hyphenated building numbers indicate that the house or building is on a street or alley that is too small or too short to receive a name of its own. Instead all buildings on this street or alley (or network of small alleys) share the same building number, followed by a hyphen, followed by a unique number afterwards. For example, if a network of small alleys branched off from basic number 12, then the buildings in that network of alleys would have addresses such as 12-1, 12-2, 12-3, 12-4 etc. Hyphenated building numbers also are used, in the case of several buildings in one basic interval (see 11, 11-1 and 11-2).

General building
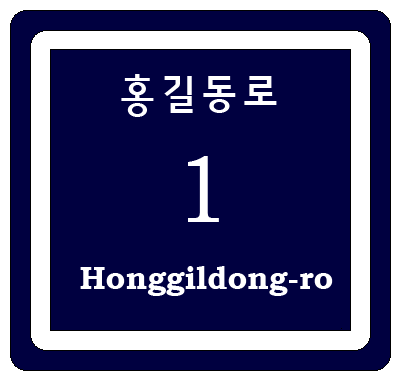
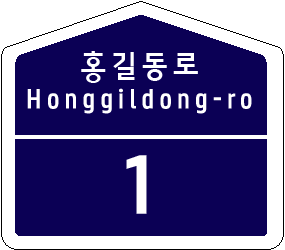
Building number plate (1 digit)

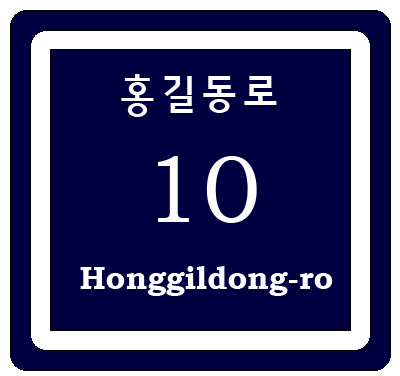
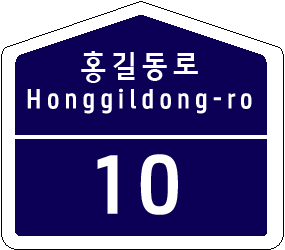
Building number plate (2 digits)

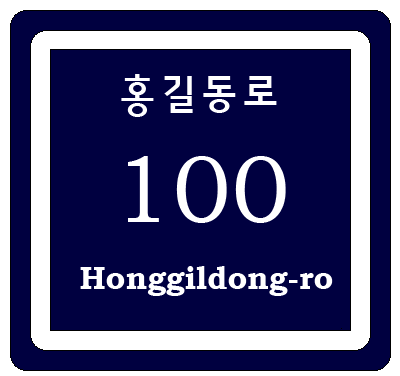
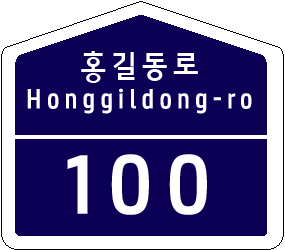
Building number plate (3 digits)

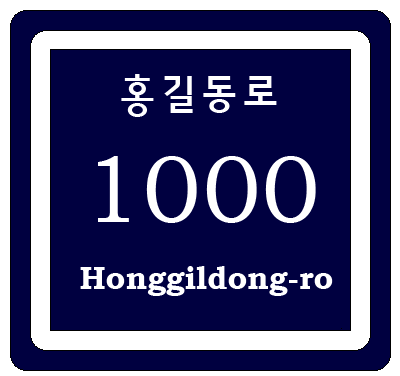
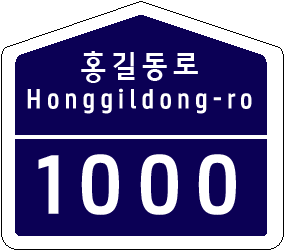
Building number plate (4 digits)

Historical sites and tourist attractions

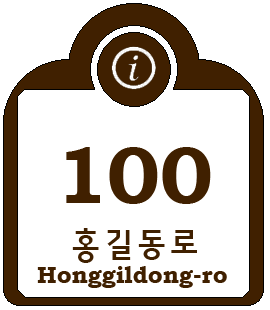

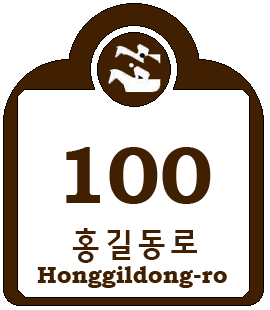

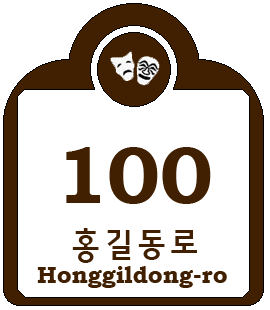

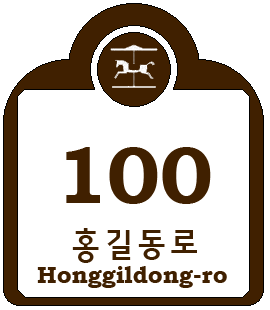

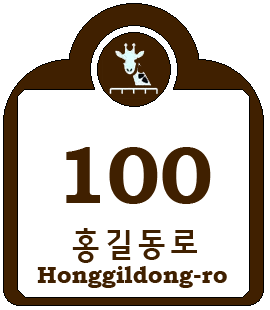

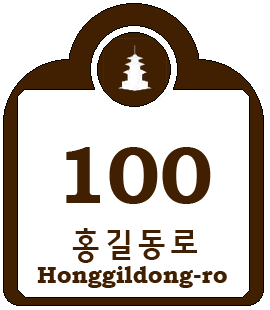

Tourist Information
Racetrack
Theater
Playground
Zoo
Temple

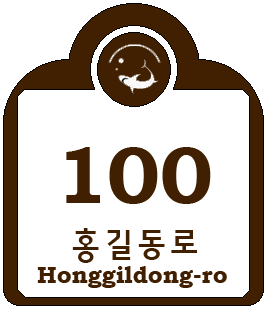

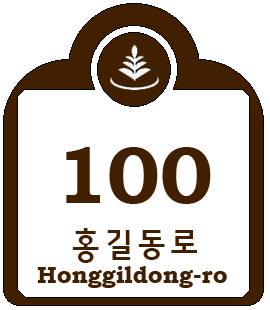

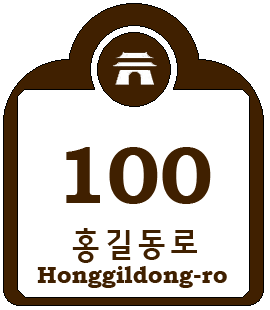

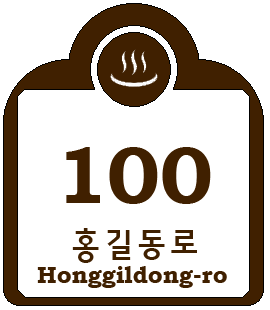

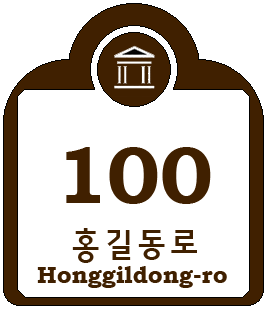

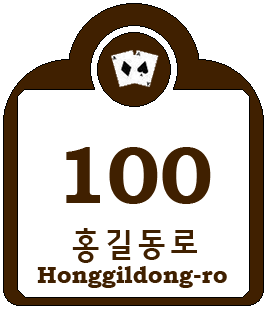

Aquarium
Botanical gardens
Historical building
Hot spring
Museum
Casino

Public office

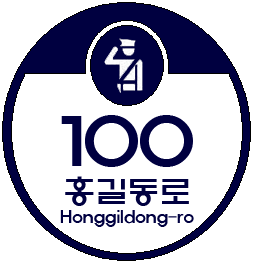

Police station

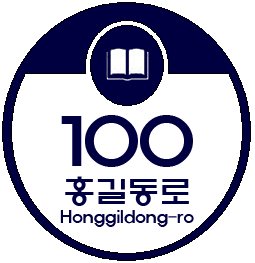

Library

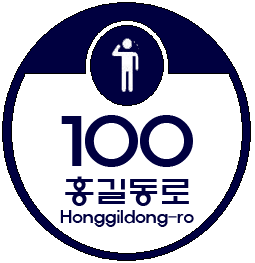

Shelter for lost children

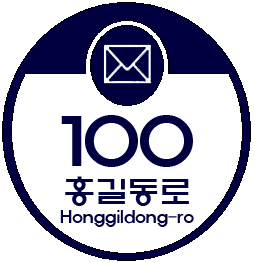

Post office

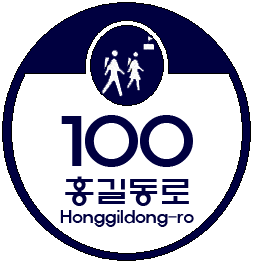

School

== Sample postal address ==
An address written using this street address is similar to the previous system when it is written in Korean in that the largest entity is written first, and the recipient is written last. The district (gu) is generally included before the street name, and the neighborhood, city block, and building number (within the city block) are not included.

Example in Korean	Romanized, in Korean order	
(대한민국) 서울특별시 종로구 사직로3길 23, 102동 304호 홍길동 귀하; 30174	(Daehan-minguk); Seoul-teukbyeolsi, Jongno-gu, Sajik-ro-3-gil 23, 102-dong 304-ho Hong Gildong gwiha 30174	Country name (South Korea); Address line (From larger to smaller division); Recipient; Postal code
Anglicized, in Western order	Anglicized, alternative	
Mr. Gildong Hong; Bldg. 102 Unit 304; 23 Sajik-ro-3-gil; Jongno-gu, Seoul 30174 (South Korea)	Mr. Gildong Hong; Apt. 102-304; 23 Sajik-ro-3-gil; Jongno-gu, Seoul 30174 (South Korea)	Recipient; Address line (secondary unit); Address line (street level); City, province names and postal code Country name (South Korea)

	Korean	Romanized	Anglicized
Provincial- or metropolitan-level division	서울특별시	Seoul-teukbyeolsi	Seoul (Special City)
County- or district-level subdivision	종로구	Jongno-gu	Jongno (District)
Street name and number	사직로3길 23	Sajik-ro-3-gil 23	23 Sajik-ro-3-gil (Street)
Secondary unit	102동 304호	102-dong 304-ho	Apt. 102-304 (or, Bldg. 102 Unit 304)
Name of the recipient	홍길동 (귀하)	Hong Gildong (gwiha)	(Mr.) Gildong Hong
Postal code	30174		

Just as in the East Asian system, different administrative divisions may be listed before the street name to make the location clear (for example, the province and city). If problems may arise with the Road Name Address system due to its relative newness, the traditional address may be included in parentheses afterwards. For example, Korea Post gives its address as 서울특별시 종로구 종로 6 (서린동 154-1) (Seoul Special City, Jongno-gu, Jong-no 6 (Seorin-dong 154-1)).

=== Older land-lot number addressing system ===
The older land-lot addressing system, which is based directly on the Japanese addressing system, was adopted by Korea under Japanese rule (1910-1945). The new system replacing it was introduced on July 29, 2011, and the land-lot system was officially decommissioned on December 31, 2013.

In the old system, a typical building in South Korea was described by the administrative divisions in which it lies. If the address was written in Korean, the largest division was written first, followed by the smaller divisions, and finally the building and the recipient. If the recipient was in a multi-unit building, the floor and apartment or suite number may follow.

A typical building in Seoul, for example, belonged to Seoul, a particular ward (gu, 구, 區), and a neighborhood (dong, 동, 洞) within that ward. (Neighborhood names that include numbers, such as Seocho 2-dong (서초2동) in the example below, indicate that the neighborhood was once part of a larger neighborhood that was divided for administrative purposes, possibly because the original neighborhood's population grew too large for a single neighborhood.) Each neighborhood was divided into city blocks (beonji, 번지, 番地), which ranged from several dozen to several thousand per neighborhood. The building itself was given a building number (ho, 호, 戶) within the city block. (Usually, the words "번지" and "호" are not included in the written address; instead, only their numbers, separated by a hyphen, are written.) As in Japan, these building numbers were assigned by order of construction and did not increment in a logical sequence, causing confusion.

If the building had a name, then the city block and building numbers were in some cases omitted, or the name may have followed these numbers. After the building name or number, the floor (cheung, 층, 層) may have been written, followed by the apartment or suite number (ho, 호, 號) and, finally, the recipient.

Below is a fictitious example of a land-lot style address in Seoul. Note that the neighborhood, Seocho 2-dong, includes a number and was probably split from Seocho-dong. Also, the words "번지" and "호" are omitted, and only their numbers are written, separated by a hyphen. There is no line convention for addresses written in Korean, and the entire address may be written in one line on the envelope.

Example in Korean	Romanized, Korean order
(대한민국) 서울특별시 종로구 내수2동 199번지 1호 신라아파트 102동 304호 홍길동 귀하; 103-531	(Daehan-minguk); Seoul-teukbyeolsi, Jongno-gu, Naesu-2-dong 199-beonji 1-ho, Silla Apateu 102-dong 304-ho Hong Gildong gwiha 103-531
Anglicized, in Western order	Anglicized, alternative
Mr. Gildong Hong; Silla Apt. Bldg. 102 Unit 304; 199-1 Naesu-2-dong; Jongno-gu, Seoul 103-531 (South Korea)	Mr. Gildong Hong; Silla Apt. 102-304; 199-1 Naesu-2-dong; Jongno-gu, Seoul 103-531 (South Korea)

	Korean	Romanized	Anglicized
Provincial- or metropolitan-level division	서울특별시	Seoul-teukbyeolsi	Seoul (Special City)
County- or district-level subdivision	종로구	Jongno-gu	Jongno (District)
Neighborhood name and land-lot number	내수2동 199번지 1호 (내수2동 199-1)	Naesu-2-dong 199-beonji 1-ho	199-1 of 2nd Naesu Neighborhood
Secondary unit with complex name	신라아파트 102동 304호	Silla Apateu 102-dong 304-ho	Silla Apt. 102-304 (or, Bldg. 102 Unit 304)
Name of the recipient	홍길동 (귀하)	Hong Gildong (gwiha)	(Mr.) Gildong Hong
Postal code	103-531		

Other administrative divisions found in South Korean addresses are provinces, metropolitan cities, cities, counties, towns, townships, and villages. A Korean address written using the East Asian system uses between two and four of the aforementioned administrative divisions, in addition to the city block and building numbers, to describe the building's location (the example above uses three: special city, ward, and neighborhood).

When written in the Latin alphabet, the order is reversed so that the recipient is first and the city is last. Note that "gu" and "dong" are written in lower-case and connected with a hyphen, and that they are not translated into English. Also, SOUTH KOREA is added afterwards (always in English) for international mail. The recipient's family name may be capitalized to avoid ambiguity. It should also be noted that there is no official convention for South Korean addresses written in the Latin alphabet, and addresses are written in many ways. Mail carriers, however, are trained to interpret various formats, and should have little trouble delivering mail, especially if the postal code is included.

== See also ==
- Address (geography)
- Administrative divisions of South Korea
- building numbering
