= TinyURL =

URL shortening service

- Website type: URL shortening
- Owner: TinyURL LLC
- Creator: Kevin Gilbertson
- Revenue: Subscription, Advertising
- Website: www.tinyurl.com
- Registration: Yes
- Launched: January 2002; 24 years ago
- Current status: Active

TinyURL is a URL shortening web service, which provides short aliases for redirection of long URLs. Kevin Gilbertson, a web developer, launched the service in January 2002 as a way to post links in newsgroup postings which frequently had long, cumbersome addresses. TinyURL was the first notable URL shortening service and is one of the oldest still currently operating.

== Service ==
The TinyURL homepage includes a form which is used to submit a long URL for shortening. For each URL entered, the server adds a new alias in its hashed database and returns a short URL. According to the website, the shortened URLs will never expire.

TinyURL offers an API which allows applications to automatically create short URLs.

Short URL aliases are seen as useful because they are easier to write down, remember or distribute. They also fit in text boxes with a limited number of characters allowed. Some examples of limited text boxes are IRC channel topics, email signatures, microblogs (such as X, which notably limited all posts to 140 characters at first, and later 280 characters), certain printed newspapers (such as .net magazine or even Nature), and email clients that impose line breaks on messages at a certain length.

Starting in 2008, TinyURL allowed users to create custom, more meaningful aliases. This means that a user can create descriptive URLs rather than a randomly generated address. For example, https://tinyurl.com/wp-tinyurl leads to the Wikipedia article about the website.

=== Preview short URLs ===
To preview the full URL from the short TinyURL, the user can visit TinyURL first and enable previews as a default browser cookie setting or copy and paste the short URL into the browser address bar, and prepend the short tinyurl.com/x with preview.tinyurl.com/x. Another preview feature is not well documented at the TinyURL site, but the alternative shortened URL with preview capability is also offered to shortcut creators as an option at the time of the creation of the link.

== Impact ==
=== Similar services ===
The popularity of TinyURLs influenced the creation of at least 100 similar websites. Most are simply domain alternatives while some offer additional features.

=== X (formerly Twitter) ===
People posting on X (formerly Twitter) often made extensive use of shortened URLs to keep their tweets within the service-imposed 140-character limit. Twitter used TinyURL until 2009, before switching to Bit.ly. Currently, X uses its own t.co domain for this purpose, automatically shortening links longer than 31 characters using its t.co domain.

== TinyURL-whacking ==
The TinyURL method of allocating shorter web addresses has inspired an exploration activity known as TinyURL-whacking. Random letters and numbers can be appended after the first forward slash tinyurl.com/, in an attempt to find and reveal interesting sites without finding and copying a previously known referrer's link.

== See also ==
- URL redirection
- URL shortening
- Bitly
