= .geo =

Generic top-level domain

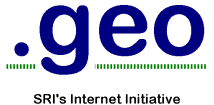
- Introduced: Not officially introduced; proposed in 2000
- TLD type: Proposed top-level domain
- Status: Unofficial proposal
- Registry: None yet
- Sponsor: SRI International
- Intended use: To associate Internet resources with geographical locations
- Actual use: Not available for use
- Registration restrictions: To be used only to publish geographical data in specified system
- Structure: Would have structure based on geographical coordinates to give addresses to "georegistries", like acme.2e5n.10e30n.geo
- Documents: Proposal to ICANN
- Dispute policies: Normal sorts of "cybersquatting" are not possible given structure
- Registry website: DotGeo

.geo was a generic top-level domain proposed by SRI International to be used to associate Internet resources with geographical locations, via a system of "georegistrars" and "georegistries" with hierarchical addresses representing locations in a grid encircling the Earth. These addresses are not intended to be typed in directly by end-users (and hence are "messy" strings like acme.2e5n.10e30n.geo) but rather, would be used "behind the scenes" by software looking things up by location (possibly driven by GPS positioning in mobile devices).

A number of schemes have been proposed or implemented in an attempt to classify Internet sites geographically; many of them do not require anything special in DNS (e.g., the GeoURL initiative). The .geo proposal can, hence, be criticized as making unnecessary use of a top-level domain where it might have been implemented using subdomains elsewhere (perhaps within .arpa, the domain allocated for infrastructure lookups), or with non-DNS methods such as "meta" tags in Web sites.

.geo was proposed to ICANN as part of the first round of new top-level domains in 2000, but failed to gain approval, and there has not been any noticeable activity regarding this proposal for several years.
