= Bitly =

American link management platform

- Website type: URL shortening, bookmarks, QR Codes, analytics, and (link‑in‑bio) landing pages
- Available in: English
- Owner: Spectrum Equity
- Key people: Peter Krivkovich (CEO)
- Employees: 234 (2020)
- Website: bitly.com
- Registration: Required
- Launched: September 13, 2009; 17 years ago
- Current status: Active

Bitly is a URL shortening service and a link management platform. The company Bitly, Inc. was established in 2008. It is privately held and based in New York City. Bitly shortens 600 million links per month, for use in social networking, SMS, and email. Bitly makes money by charging for access to aggregate data created as a result of many people using the shortened URLs.

In 2017, Spectrum Equity acquired a majority stake in Bitly for $63 million.

From November 2023, guest users can no longer create short links; an account is required.

== Products ==
The Bitly URL shortening service became popular on Twitter after it became the default URL shortening service on the website on May 6, 2009. It was subsequently replaced by Twitter's own t.co service.

The company behind Bitly launched a similar service, but for online videos, to determine what videos are the most popular on the web.

The company offers a paid solution called Bitly Enterprise that provides advanced branding features, audience intel, omnichannel campaign tracking, custom QR codes and more. Companies can use their own custom domains to generate shortened links; for example, The New York Times uses nyti.ms and Pepsi uses pep.si. This allows the company to push brand awareness on services such as Twitter but use the Bitly engine to generate the shortened URLs and track marketing metrics. Bitly Enterprise also has advanced analytics features and uses Bitly data to provide advanced social insight tools for companies and brands.

In December 2021, Bitly acquired Egoditor GmbH, developer of QR Code Generator, as part of its expansion beyond link shortening.

== Technology ==
The company uses HTTP 301 redirects for its links. The shortcuts are intended to be permanent and cannot be changed once they are created. URLs that are shortened with the bitly service use the bit.ly domain or any other generic domain that the service offers.

Starting October 12, 2010, users could automatically generate QR codes that, when scanned with a mobile QR code reader, automatically directed users to shortened links.

On May 29, 2012, Bitly announced "Bitmarks", a new search feature, with enhanced public profiles and an iPhone app.

In 2025, Bitly announced that links made with the free plan would no longer be just redirects, but would instead feature an intermediate page with advertisements.

In 2025 and 2026, old Bitly links on X were the subject of a "dead link hijacking" scheme. The 2025 incident saw cryptocurrency scammers hijacking links in old tweets by Donald Trump to promote meme coins. The 2026 incident involved multiple accounts, including Trump, Justin Trudeau, McDonald's, Burger King and Nintendo. These links were hijacked to lead to sites both memetic and offensive. Examples of the more offensive redirects include Trump's account linking to the Wikipedia page to the Epstein files (among several other, more innocuous links) and Burger King linking to the List of Nazi concentration camps where a location finder formerly stood. Bitly suspended the accounts of involved parties, and X disabled automatic link embedding for Bitly links in response to the 2026 incident.

== Alternative domains ==
.ly is the country code top-level domain (ccTLD) for Libya. In 2011, the bit.ly address was set to redirect to bitly.com.

The .ly TLD is controlled by the Libyan government, which has previously removed one domain deemed incompatible with Islamic law.

Bitly users on paid plans can use a custom domain registered separately by the user and redirected to Bitly's servers via the DNS record.

Bitly used to offer additional domains: bitly.com and j.mp (using the top-level domain of the Northern Mariana Islands, a commonwealth of the United States). This functionality is no longer available.

== See also ==
- Google URL Shortener
- TinyURL
- URL redirection
