= .nai =

Proposed generic top-level domain

.nai was a proposed generic top-level domain (gTLD) for Native, Aboriginal & Indigenous communities of the Americas. This proposal was the successor to the 1999 .naa proposal to ICANN for "a gTLD jurisdictionally scoped to North America and the territories, trusts and treaty dependencies of the United States and Canada, and with a policy model of registry delegation to, and registry operation by, the Indigenous Nations and Peoples of North America."

== See also ==
- .cat
- .eus
- .gal
- .bzh
- .scot
