= .ch =

Top-level Internet domain for Switzerland

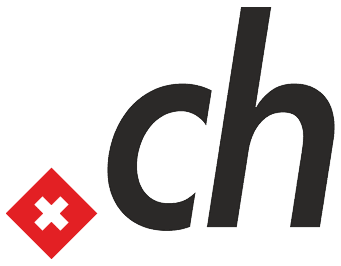
- Introduced: 20 May 1987
- TLD type: Country code top-level domain
- Status: Active
- Registry: SWITCH Information Technology Services
- Sponsor: SWITCH Information Technology Services
- Intended use: Entities connected with Switzerland
- Actual use: Very popular in Switzerland and also used around the world for domain hacks
- Registered domains: 2,564,228 (2024-01-15)
- Registration restrictions: Two letter domain names are restricted to cantons
- Structure: Registrations permitted at second level
- Documents: Terms and conditions
- Dispute policies: Dispute Resolution Proceedings
- DNSSEC: Yes
- Registry website: www.nic.ch

.ch is the country code top-level domain (ccTLD) for Switzerland in the Domain Name System of the Internet.

== Naming ==
The domain ch, as with other ccTLDs, is based on the ISO 3166-2 code for Switzerland derived from Confoederatio Helvetica (Helvetic Confederation), the Latin name for the country, which was used because of its neutrality with regard to the four official languages of Switzerland.

== Registration ==
Made available in 1987, only two years after .com, it is administered by SWITCH Information Technology Services.

Second-level domain names must be at least three letters long. Two-letter subdomain names are restricted to the Swiss cantons, as well as the domain ch.ch of the Federal Chancellery of Switzerland.

The only exception has been the former domain of the Expo.02 which was held in Switzerland, www.expo.02.ch.

Registrations of internationalized domain names have been accepted since March 2004.

=== In the Chinese domain market ===
.ch has been of a rising interest to Chinese domain investors for several reasons. According to EuropeID.com, the domain .ch still has many valuable English keywords and short letter and number combinations left.

A contributing factor may be because the majority of .ch registrations are in German, leaving many English words available.

In addition, with two million domains under .ch being registered, most of the reserved domains have the European market in mind, allowing valuable domains for other languages such as Chinese keywords in the Latin script being registered at a normal price.

== Domain hacks ==
The .ch domain is very popular in domain hacks, used to spell words and names that end in "ch".

For example, Techcrunch's tcrn.ch, as well as the University of Michigan's myumi.ch and umresear.ch.

This phenomenon is not limited to English; to take another example, the domain scha.ch (Schach, German for "chess") has been registered.

== .swiss ==
The Federal Office of Communications (OFCOM) has begun registering .swiss domains as of 7 September 2015 meant to augment the traditional .ch TLD.

Applicants must currently have a "registered place of business and a physical administrative base in Switzerland" to apply.
