= Service d'adresse mondial =

The Worldwide Address Service (French: service d'adresse mondial), abbreviated as Sedamo, is an Internet-based service for conveying addresses, especially those which include non-Latin characters (such as Chinese, Japanese, or Korean).

The system assigns a unique eight-letter code, the Sedamo, to each address, which can be used to retrieve the original address in native writing. It is operated by the Cross-Cultural Communication Club (CCCC), a British charity. Using sedamo via the website is free, and its upkeep is financed by donations.

== Background ==
The system was established to alleviate the language barrier encountered when Westerners need to reference postal addresses which use non-Latin scripts, especially those from Asia. Though workarounds exist, such as the use of romanisation systems, these were considered error-prone and slowed down postal delivery due to ambiguities in romanisation and a lack of proficiency in Latin script among postmen in destination countries.Sedamo was conceived as an easy way to ensure the easy and accurate communication of written addresses.

== Usage ==
Addresses can be retrieved from the sedamo web site as a bitmap image and can be printed directly onto an envelope or address label, and the end user does not have to install any special software or font. The sedamo system automatically generates a romanisation of any address. This romanisation can be used if a logistics company only accepts addresses written in Latin script. The code can be used to print out the foreign address in an international format, as recommended by the Universal Postal Union.

== The sedamo Address Code ==
Sedamo address codes consist of eight letters (e.g., CT-QP-ED-TP). (Note: This is the code for the Hall of Prayer for Good Harvests inside the Temple of Heaven in Beijing, China.) Dashes are included to increase readability, but can be omitted. The code may contain any Latin letter, but not the letters "I" (which can be mistaken for "1" or "J"), N (similar to "M"), "O" ("0"), "S" ("5"), "V" ("U" or "W"), and "Z" ("2").

The code contains a check digit to help combat simple errors such as a single mistyped letter; the permutation of two successive letters does not lead to a wrong address but an error message. Moreover, neighbouring addresses are assigned completely different codes to prevent confusion.

Sedamo codes describe an address or location, and not a receiver, such as a person or company. The only exception is the code AA-AA-AA-AA, which is assigned to the address of the sedamo division of the Cross-Cultural Communication Club.

To distinguish the sender's and receiver's codes, a pair of Angle brackets or greater-than signs are used before the receiver's code and after the sender's code (e.g. AA-AA-AA-AA >> CT-QP-ED-TP). For automation purposes, the CCCC suggests the code to be printed alongside a Code 39 barcode with a leading "%+" (percent sign followed by plus sign) for the receiver's code and a "%-" (percent sign followed by minus sign) for the sender's code without dashes (e.g. *%-AAAAAAAA%+CTQPEDTP* or *%+CTQPEDTP%-AAAAAAAA*).

== sedamo-based services ==
The Cross-Cultural Communication Club (CCCC), the operator of the sedamo system, licenses an API to software developers so that they can access the sedamo database. As such, software can be developed to retrieve addresses and to print address labels and waybills. Access to the sedamo database is requires the use of a username, password, and transaction authentication number (TAN), which are provided by the software developer who licensed the sedamo technology, and not by the CCCC itself.

The website email2address.com supports registering an e-mail address in conjunction with a sedamo address code. After registration, the e-mail address can be used to retrieve the sedamo address code, and thus the postal/physical address.

== Examples of application ==
Sedamo address codes have been used in the book "ChinaBridgeBUSINESS", a trilingual business guide for China and Europe. The addresses of government departments, trade organisations, etc. are given in Latin script, and readers can retrieve the native address using sedamo.

Using the corresponding sedamo codes and the "ChinaBridgeMOBILE"app, users can store addresses on their smartphones and display them offline in large characters for use in communication with foreigners.

== See also ==
- Romanization
- Universal Postal Union
- Internationalization and localization
- Language barrier
- Geocoding
- What3words
