= Postal addresses in Taiwan =

Postal addresses in Taiwan (Republic of China) when written in Chinese start from the largest administrative unit and continue to the smallest, although in English the order is often reversed.

== Format ==
Addresses start with a postal code, followed by administrative divisions in the following order:

1. Municipality (市 shì) or county (縣 xiàn)
2. City district (區 qū), urban township (鎮 zhèn) or rural township (鄉 xiāng)
3. Urban village (里 lǐ) or rural village (村 cūn)
4. Neighborhood (鄰 lín)

Villages and neighborhoods are optional. Next is the street address, also in order from larger to smaller:

1. Road (路 lù) or street (街 jiē)
2. Section (段 duàn), for longer roads
3. Lane (巷 xiàng)
4. Alley (弄 nòng)
5. Sub-Alley (衖 lòng)
6. House number (號 hào)
7. Floor (樓 lóu) or building (棟 dòng)
8. Apartment (之 zhi) (之 can also be a nearby independent house.)

House numbers are generally in geographic order with odd and even numbers on opposite sides of the street. However, numbering resets when a new road section starts, so that No. 295, Section 1 may be followed by No. 1, Sec. 2. It is also not uncommon for new numbers to be inserted, resulting in No. 5, No. 5-1, No. 7, etc.

== Examples ==
The main address of Chunghwa Post, which is located directly on a main street in Taipei, is written in Chinese as (old 3+2 postal code: 10603):

106409
臺北市大安區
金山南路2段55號

Reversing the order, the English address, also with 3+3 postal code:

No. 55, Sec. 2, Jinshan S. Rd., Da-an District, Taipei City 106409, Taiwan (R.O.C.)
