= General Posts and Telecommunications Company =

The General Posts and Telecommunications Company (GPTC) is the state-owned organisation responsible for overseeing all postal and telecommunication services in Libya. This includes fixed telephony, satellite communications, mobile telephony (in partnership with Al Madar and Libyana Mobile Phone) and other Libyan internet service providers.

The company was established in 1984 with 70 telecom offices and 340 postal offices and 8 postal distributions centers, with the main post office is located in Tripoli. Libya has been a UPU member since 1952.

The company is the main internet provider in Libya, and it cut internet connections between Libya and the rest of the world very shortly after the beginning of the protests against the Gaddafi regime that would result in the Libyan Civil War in progress. Internet was restored 21 August 2011.

== Internet censorship ==
In 2013, an 'Official' Court order was called in to bar users from browsing pornographic material. While the rule applies to censoring pornographic sites, it has been found that Internet filters have blocked other websites, including some that may have been omitted due to a political nature. There have been protests regarding the censorship; however, these protests appear to have been ignored. Due to lacking security and recent activist and journalist assassinations and kidnappings, people have found it to be unsafe to recite their rights of freedom of speech. This new filter system was implemented in 2013, and also filters proxy sites from being visited, adding to the controversial move by the telecommunications companies in Libya.

On 2 September 2018, GPTC issued a block on Facebook and barred users in Libya from using the service over suspected rumors about the current incursion carried out by Tarhuna militias in South Tripoli - Salah-Adin district on 1 September. This is not the first time the blocks were introduced; in fact, in 2011 during the initial days of the revolution, a total internet blackout was introduced by the Gaddafi regime. Currently, it appears that freedom of the flow of information was not included in GPTC's agenda in regulating the internet.

Websites such as Facebook may still be accessed through using free proxy sites.

== Infrastructure ==
While the GPTC company has been around since 1980's, most of Libya's cable infrastructure, wiring, telephone service and postal service are severely lacking in standard and quality. Residential areas in Central Tripoli are plagued by disorganized wiring and cable placing, making it a nightmare as well as an utter eyesore for the residents. Conditions have not improved since. Postal service is also severely lacking, with mail primarily having to go through Gaddafi-era government checks, until finally landing in one of the main publicly accessible government-controlled postal offices.

== See also ==
- Libya Telecom & Technology
- Postage stamps and postal history of Libya
