= ARNES =

Slovenian public institution

Academic and Research Network of Slovenia
- Abbreviation: ARNES
- Formation: May 1992
- Legal status: Public institution
- Headquarters: Ljubljana, Slovenia
- Region served: Slovenia
- Director: Marko Bonač
- Main organ: Board of Directors
- Website: www.arnes.si/en

The Academic and Research Network of Slovenia (Slovene: Akademska in raziskovalna mreža Slovenije) is a public institute in Slovenia, established in May 1992. Its main task is development, operation and management of the communication and information network for education and research. ARNES also operates the Slovenian Internet Exchange. The members of its management board are appointed by the Government of Slovenia.

Also a part of ARNES, is SI-CERT, the Slovenian Computer Emergency Response Team. It was established in 1994 and has been led by Gorazd Božič. SI-CERT was involved in the take-down of the recordings of the Government of Slovenia's closed session recordings leaked in December 2011 on YouTube. The recordings were taken down by YouTube after the copyright-related lawsuit threat by SI-CERT. It has not been involved in the investigation of the leak.
