= Libya Telecom & Technology =

Libyan telecommunications company

Libya Telecom & Technology (LTT)
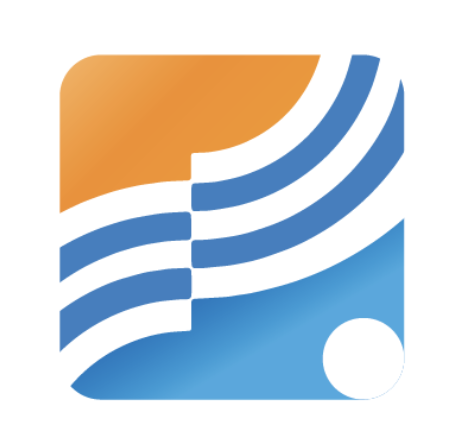
- Type: State-owned enterprise
- Industry: Telecommunications
- Founded: 1997
- Headquarters: Tripoli, Libya
- Services: Telephone; Internet Access; Mobile Telephony
- Parent: Libyan Post, Telecommunications and Information Technology Company
- Website: ltt.ly

Libya Telecom & Technology (LTT; Arabic: ليبيا للاتصالات والتقنية) is a Libyan government-owned company established in 1997 and based in Tripoli, Libya. As the country's most used service provider, LTT accounts for much of Libya's internet penetration, largely thanks to its DSL and 4G services. On 6 March 2018, LTT announced their new LTT4G network, which has been available to the public since then.

In March 2012, Saad Ksheer was appointed CEO of the company, following his previous posts with Microsoft and NCR in the US and UAE. Later Saad was sacked and replaced.

== Internet censorship and filtering ==
As of September 2013, Libya Telecom and Technology had implemented a filter system designed to omit pornographic media from viewing to the public. The move to omit pornographic material was reportedly started by the Local Islamic Judicial Court of Tripoli archived under article 421 of criminal Penalties. This move comes with the 2013 implementation of Islamic sharia law in the aftermath of the first civil war.

While it is true that pornographic material is being omitted by LTT's local filtering system, LTT's censorship filter affects any aspect regarding the reproductive system in humans, and or any words deemed "immoral", as the recognition software does not discriminate between educative websites and adult websites, barring users from accessing information regarding reproduction, pregnancy, and medical or educative websites. Any input into a search engine with inappropriate words are instantly flagged by the system and access is denied.

== Services ==
ADSL Services are deemed slower than the new 4G services due to disorganized cable infrastructure requiring adequate maintenance and repair providing consumers slower than expected internet speeds. Cable infrastructure especially in the Tripoli Residential capital area ( Omar Al-Mukhtar ) can be observed as being disorganized and damaged, with old copper wiring still serving the typical household and not providing the intended-advertised services. LTT Headquarters is near the capital - 'Al-Shat Road / Coastal Road' where Residential areas are most dense, hence cable infrastructure is inevitably disorganized and poorly maintained, bringing about poor service delivery to typical households in and out of the capital area.

=== Internet access solutions ===
- LTT4G (4G+)
- LTTADSL (ADSL2+)
- LTTVDSL (VDSL2)
- LTTFiber (Fiber to the home)
- LTTFWA (Fixed wireless access)
- LibyaPhone (MVNO Mobile)
- Satellite (DVB-RCS) Access
- LibyaMAX (WiMAX) (Discontinued)
- Dial-up Internet Access (Discontinued)

=== Data network connection solutions ===
- Data Network via Wireless
- Data Network via VSAT

=== Communication solutions ===
- VSAT
- Microwave
- GSM
- 3G
- HSPA+
- 4G
- FWA

=== Value-added services ===
- Webhosting and E-mail Services
- Network Security Services

=== Consultation services ===
- Technology and Communications
