= Google URL Shortener =

Discontinued URL shortening service

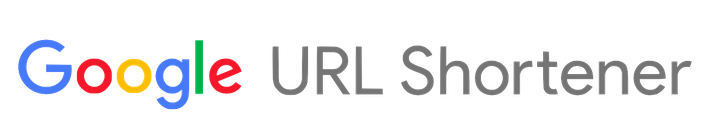
- The Google URL Shortener full wordmark logo
- Website type: URL shortening
- Successor: Firebase Dynamic Links
- Owner: Google LLC
- Website: goo.gl
- Launched: December 14, 2009; 16 years ago
- Current status: Discontinued as of March 30, 2019. Existing links stopped working on August 25, 2025.

Google URL Shortener, also known as goo.gl, was a URL shortening service owned by Google. It was launched in December 2009, initially used for Google Toolbar and Feedburner. The company launched a separate website, goo.gl, in September 2010.

== Access ==
Google replaced the service internally with Firebase Dynamic Links (FDLs), but discontinued the service in 2025. FDLs were used to shorten links for Google Maps and Google Workspace products.

The user could access a list of URLs that had been shortened in the past after logging in to their Google Account. Real-time analytics data, including traffic over time, top referrers, and visitor profiles was recorded. For security, Google added automatic spam system detection based on the same type of filtering technology used in Gmail.

== Discontinuation ==
The service has not been accepting new users since April 13, 2018 and Google discontinued the service for existing users on March 30, 2019. Existing links will no longer redirect to the intended destination, with the goo.gl links generated via Google apps. It was succeeded by Firebase Dynamic Links, but existing links did not become Dynamic Links automatically. As of August 25, 2025, Firebase Dynamic Links have been deprecated.

On July 18, 2024, Google announced that existing Google URL shortener URLs would stop working as of August 25, 2025 with the exception of goo.gl links generated via Google apps. Google added an interstitial page to warn users about this on August 23, 2024. As of August 2025, the Wayback Machine had archived approximately 1.3M goo.gl URLs, and at least 4,000 URLs indexed by Google Scholar will be completely deprecated. Deprecated short links return a different HTML 404 page than short link URLs that never existed.
