= América Móvil =

Mexican multinational telecommunications company

América Móvil, S.A.B. de C.V.

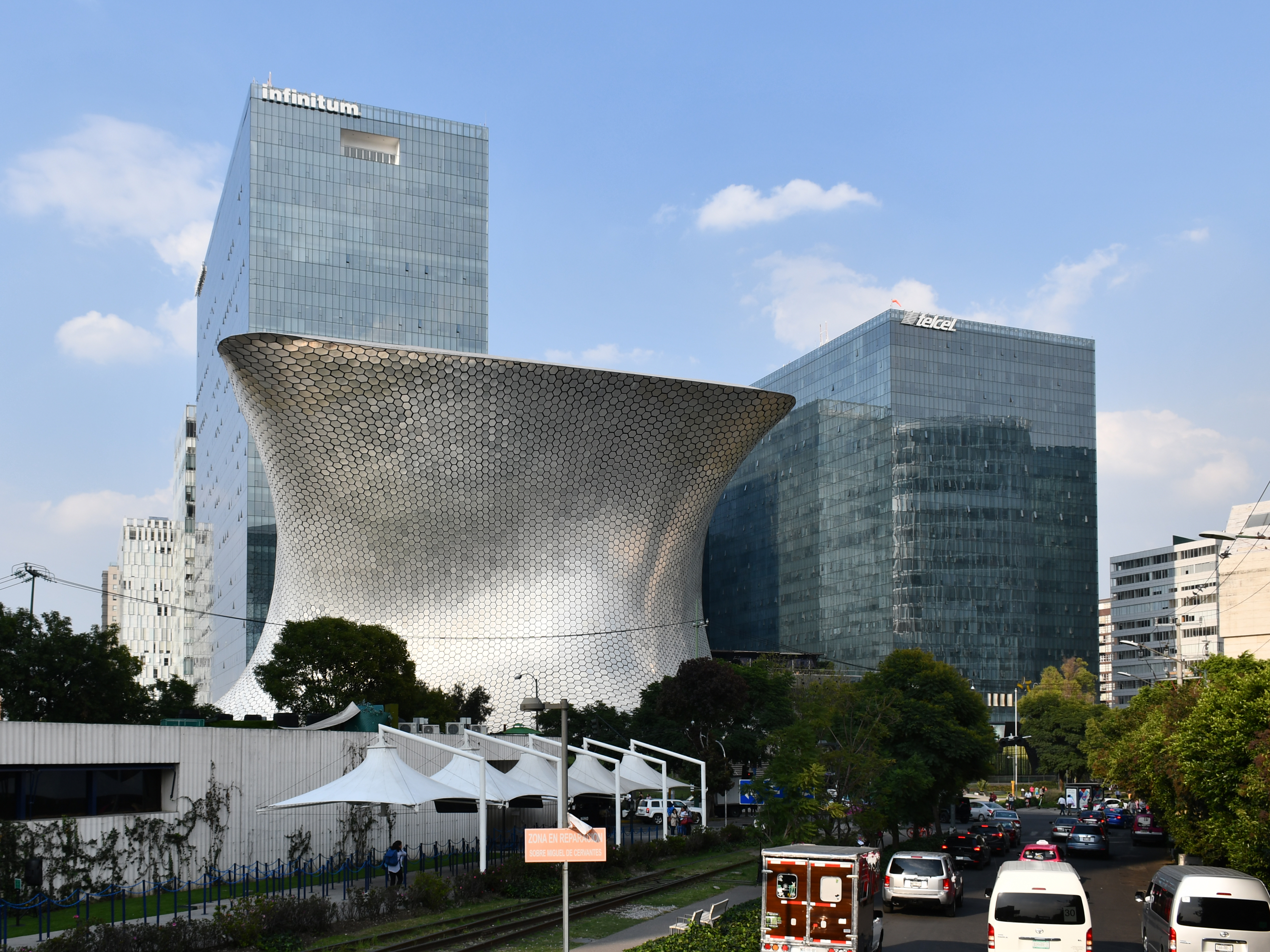
- Type: Public
- Traded as: BMV: AMX; NYSE: AMX (ADR); BMAD: XAMXL
- Industry: Telecommunications
- Founded: 25 September 2000; 26 years ago
- Headquarters: Plaza Carso, Mexico City, Mexico.
- Areas served: Americas; Europe
- Key people: (Chairman Emeritus); Carlos Slim Helú (Chairman); Carlos Slim Domit (CEO); Daniel Hajj Aboumrad
- Products: Fixed-line; Mobile phone Broadband, Digital television IPTV; Digital Media; Internet of things
- Brands: Claro; Claro TV+; Telcel
- Revenue: ▲MX$1.016 Trillion (Fiscal Year Ended 31 December 2020)
- Operating income: ▲MX$165.355 Billion (Fiscal Year Ended 31 December 2020)
- Net income: ▲MX$51.027 Billion (Fiscal Year Ended 31 December 2020)
- Total assets: ▲MX$1.625 Trillion (Fiscal Year Ended 31 December 2020)
- Total equity: ▲MX$315.118 Billion (Fiscal Year Ended 31 December 2020)
- Number of employees: 189,448 (2018)
- Divisions: Carso Global Telecom; Global Hitss
- Subsidiaries: Claro; Claro TV+ DLA Inc. Embratel; KPN (16.1%); Nextel Brazil; Nuestra Visión; Sección Amarilla; Sercotel; Speedy Movil; Telcel; A1 Group (59.1%); Telmex; Telnor; Telvista; Uno TV
- Website: www.americamovil.com

América Móvil, S.A.B. de C.V. is a Mexican telecommunications corporation headquartered in Mexico City, Mexico. It is the 7th largest mobile network operator in the world in terms of equity subscribers, as well as one of the largest corporations in the world. América Móvil is a Forbes Global 2000 company. As of 31 December 2023, América Móvil had 310.1 million wireless subscribers, and 73.7 million fixed revenue generating units ("RGUs", consisting of fixed voice, fixed data and Pay TV units).

== History ==
América Móvil was created when Telmex spun off its wireless mobile activities from its landline and internet activities. The company was founded in late 2000, while company shares were delivered to Telmex shareholders early the following year.

On 15 November 2005, the company signed an international pact with Ooredoo to jointly deliver various international services. In 2006, América Móvil made a bid to acquire Verizon's Latin American and Caribbean operations and unified its brands (Comcel Colombia, Porta in Ecuador, Telcel in México, Tracfone in the US and CTI Movil in Paraguay, Uruguay and Argentina) under the Claro umbrella. América Móvil acquired 100% of Jamaican mobile operator Oceanic Digital, under the brand name MiPhone in August 2007. By 2007, América Móvil's valuation was over $100 billion. In the US, its prepaid mobile subsidiary Tracfone had 8.6 million customers. 2007 was also the year América Movil's owner Carlos Slim became the richest person on the planet. In 2008, América Móvil launched the iPhone in Latin America. In 2009, América Móvil partnered with Nokia to use Nokia maps as its location-based service in Latin America. The group also launched the first Android phone in Latin America.

In January 2010, it made an offer to buy Carso Telecom and Telmex International ($21 billion for Telmex) in order to better compete against Spain's Telefonica and Malaysia's Telekom Malaysia. The acquisition was approved by the CFC (Comisión Federal de Competencia) Antitrust Office in Mexico on 11 February 2010. América Móvil had once been Telmex' mobile division, but had grown far larger than its former parent since its spinoff in 2001.

In early August 2013, América Móvil offered to take over the remaining 70% stake of the Dutch telecommunications company KPN for 7.2 billion Euros ($9.49 billion). América Móvil currently owns about 16% of KPN. The Dutch government has warned against this acquisition quoting it as a threat to national security. The Dutch government's intervention comes after the council representing employees of KPN urged authorities to halt América Móvil's planned bid.

In 2018, the company's chief executive Daniel Hajj announced that América Móvil is seeking a TV license in Mexico.

In January 2019, America Movil announces the acquisition of Telefonica's operations in Guatemala and El Salvador for $333 million and $315 million respectively. However, the agreement for Telefonica Moviles and Telefonica Multiservicios in El Salvador, under the Movistar brand, was cancelled by mutual agreement with Telefonica in 2020 due to the conditions imposed by the monitoring of competition in El Salvador.

== Monopoly issues ==
In 2012, the OECD estimated that lack of competition in telecommunications had cost the economy of Mexico $25 billion per year. The company was accused of charging especially high interconnectivity fees to thwart the competition. During the years before 2010, due to stricter regulations throughout Latin American countries, América Móvil's market shares shrunk and Telefónica gained grounds there. In 2013, América Móvil held 75% of the Mexican telecommunications market, which led the government to lead major antitrust reforms.

== Description ==
The company's world headquarters are located in Mexico City, Mexico. Its Mexican subsidiary Telcel is the largest mobile operator in that country, commanding a market share in excess of 70%. The company operates under its Claro subsidiaries in many countries in Latin America and the Caribbean, these include the Dominican Republic, Costa Rica, El Salvador, Guatemala, Honduras, Nicaragua, Peru, Argentina, Uruguay, Chile, Paraguay, Puerto Rico, Colombia and Ecuador. In Brazil it also operates Claro and other subsidiary Embratel. It owns 14,86% of KPN in the Netherlands and has done a bid on 100% of the shares. The group has also fully consolidated the Telekom Austria Group into its financial reporting, owning 51.0% of its shares and using the Austrian operator to expand América Móvil's European network.

As of December 2010, the company was one of the top four telecommunications companies in the world and boasted 290,000 kilometres of Fiber-optic cable, making it the largest in infrastructure.

As of April 2012, América Móvil registered an annual profit of $5 billion. With assets of over $67 billion (As of April 2012), the company is currently the largest company in Mexico by assets with Banorte very closely behind them with assets of over $59 billion (As of April 2012) It is highly likely that the company will buy a group of companies with at least $29 billion in assets in 2013 in the pension, insurance, payroll, currency exchange and mutual funds industries to secure their position as the most asset rich company in Mexico. And with a market value of over $93 billion (As of April 2012), the company is currently the most valuable in Mexico, more than the next three most valuable companies combined.

== América Móvil global wireless customers ==
Map of countries where América Móvil brands operate as of 2025 Telcel Claro A1

As of Q1 2019:

North America

- Mexico - Telcel 75.611 million

Central America and the Caribbean

- Costa Rica Dominican Republic El Salvador Guatemala Honduras Nicaragua Panama Puerto Rico - Claro 21.741 million

South America

- Colombia - Claro 29.887 million
- Peru - Claro 11.818 million
- Brazil - Claro 56.383 million
- Argentina Paraguay Uruguay - Claro 24.370 million
- Ecuador - Claro 8.308 million
- Chile - Claro 6.720 million

Austria and CEE 20.908 million

- Austria - A1
- Bulgaria - A1 Bulgaria
- Belarus - A1
- Croatia - A1 Hrvatska
- Slovenia - A1 Slovenija
- Serbia - A1 Srbija
- North Macedonia - A1 Macedonia
- Liechtenstein - Telecom Liechtenstein (sold in 2020)

Global wireless customers 277.425 million

=== Former assets ===
- United States - TracFone Wireless (TracFone, NET10 Wireless, Straight Talk, SafeLink Wireless, SIMPLE Mobile, Total Wireless and Telcel América) 21.599 million; acquired by Verizon Communications

== América Móvil wireless technology by country ==
=== South America ===
- (Argentina) CDMA ^{(800/1900MHZ)}, GSM/GPRS/EDGE ^{(850/1900MHZ)}, UMTS/HSDPA ^{(850/1900MHZ)} _{first UMTS live by América Móvil} LTE
- (Brazil) TDMA ^{(800MHZ, discontinued in 2009)}, GSM/GPRS/EDGE ^{(900/1800MHZ)}, UMTS/HSDPA ^{(850/2100MHZ)}, LTE ^{(700MHZ/1800MHZ/2100MHZ/2600MHZ)}
- (Colombia) TDMA ^{(800MHZ, discontinued in 2009)}, GSM/GPRS/EDGE ^{(850/1900MHZ)}, UMTS/HSDPA ^{(850MHZ, 1900MHZ)}, LTE ^{(2600MHZ, 700MHZ)}
- (Ecuador) TDMA ^{(800MHZ)}, GSM/GPRS/EDGE ^{(850MHZ soon 1900)}, UMTS/HSDPA ^{(850MHZ soon 1900)} LTE
- (Peru) GSM/GPRS/EDGE ^{(850/1900MHZ)}, UMTS/HSDPA ^{(850MHZ soon 1900)} LTE
- (Chile) CDMA ^{(1900MHZ)}, GSM/GPRS/EDGE ^{(850/1900MHZ)}, UMTS/HSDPA ^{(850MHZ soon} LTE

=== Caribbean ===
- (Puerto Rico) CDMA ^{(800/1900MHZ)}, GSM/GPRS/EDGE ^{(850/1900MHZ)}, UMTS/HSDPA ^{(850MHZ soon 1900)} LTE
- (Dominican Republic) GSM/GPRS/EDGE ^{(850/1900MHZ)}, UMTS/HSDPA ^{(850MHZ soon 1900)} LTE
- (Jamaica) CDMA ^{(800MHZ)}, GSM/GPRS/EDGE ^{(850MHZ)}, UMTS/HSDPA ^{(850MHZ)} LTE

=== Central America ===
- (Guatemala) CDMA ^{(1900MHZ)}, GSM/GPRS/EDGE ^{(900/1900MHZ)}, UMTS/HSPA ^{(1900MHZ)} _{first HSPA (High-Speed Packet Access) live by América Móvil} LTE
- (El Salvador) GSM/GPRS/EDGE ^{(1900MHZ)}, UMTS/HSDPA ^{(1900MHZ)} LTE
- (Honduras) GSM/GPRS/EDGE ^{(1900MHZ)}, UMTS/HSDPA ^{(1900MHZ)} LTE
- (Nicaragua) GSM/GPRS/EDGE ^{(1900MHZ)}, UMTS/HSDPA ^{(1900MHZ)} LTE
- (Panama) GSM/GPRS/EDGE ^{(1900MHZ)}, UMTS/HSDPA ^{(850MHZ)} LTE

=== North America ===
- (Mexico) TDMA ^{(800MHZ)}, GSM/GPRS/EDGE ^{(850/1900MHZ)}, UMTS/HSDPA ^{(850/1900MHZ)}, LTE ^{(1700MHZ)}

=== Europe ===
- (Austria) GSM/GPRS/EDGE ^{(900/1800MHZ)}, UMTS/HSDPA ^{(900/2100MHZ)}, LTE ^{(800/1800/2600MHZ)}
- (Belarus) GSM/GPRS/EDGE ^{(900/1800MHZ)}, UMTS/HSDPA ^{(900/2100MHZ)}, LTE ^{(800/1800/2600MHZ)}
- (Bulgaria) GSM/GPRS/EDGE ^{(900/1800MHZ)}, UMTS/HSDPA ^{(2100MHZ)}, LTE ^{(1800MHZ)}
- (Croatia) GSM/GPRS/EDGE ^{(900MHZ)}, UMTS/HSDPA ^{(2100MHZ)}, LTE ^{(800/1800MHZ)}
- (Slovenia) GSM/GPRS/EDGE ^{(900/1800MHZ)}, UMTS/HSDPA ^{(900/2100MHZ)}, LTE ^{(800/1800/2600MHZ)}
- (Serbia) GSM/GPRS/EDGE ^{(900/1800MHZ)}, UMTS/HSDPA ^{(900/2100MHZ)}, LTE ^{(800/1800MHZ)}
- (North Macedonia) GSM/GPRS/EDGE ^{(900/1800MHZ)}, UMTS/HSDPA ^{(2100MHZ)}, LTE ^{(800/1800/2600MHZ)}
- (Liechtenstein) GSM/GPRS/EDGE ^{(900/1800MHZ)}, UMTS/HSDPA ^{(2100MHZ)}, LTE ^{(800MHZ)} (sold in 2020)

== See also ==
- List of mobile network operators
- List of mobile network operators of the Americas
- List of telecommunications regulatory bodies
