= Telnor =

Mexican telecommunications company

Telnor, or Teléfonos del Noroeste ("Telephones of the Northwest") is a company providing telephone and internet services since 1981 (DSL through Prodigy and E1). It operates in the Mexican states of Baja California and part of the northwest of Sonora, It is part of América Móvil Telecom, which is owned by billionaire Carlos Slim.

== See also ==
- Telmex - sister telephone company within Grupo Carso
- Axtel - competition in the local telephone market
- Prodigy - its provider of DSL service
