= A1 Slovenija =

Slovenian telecommunications company

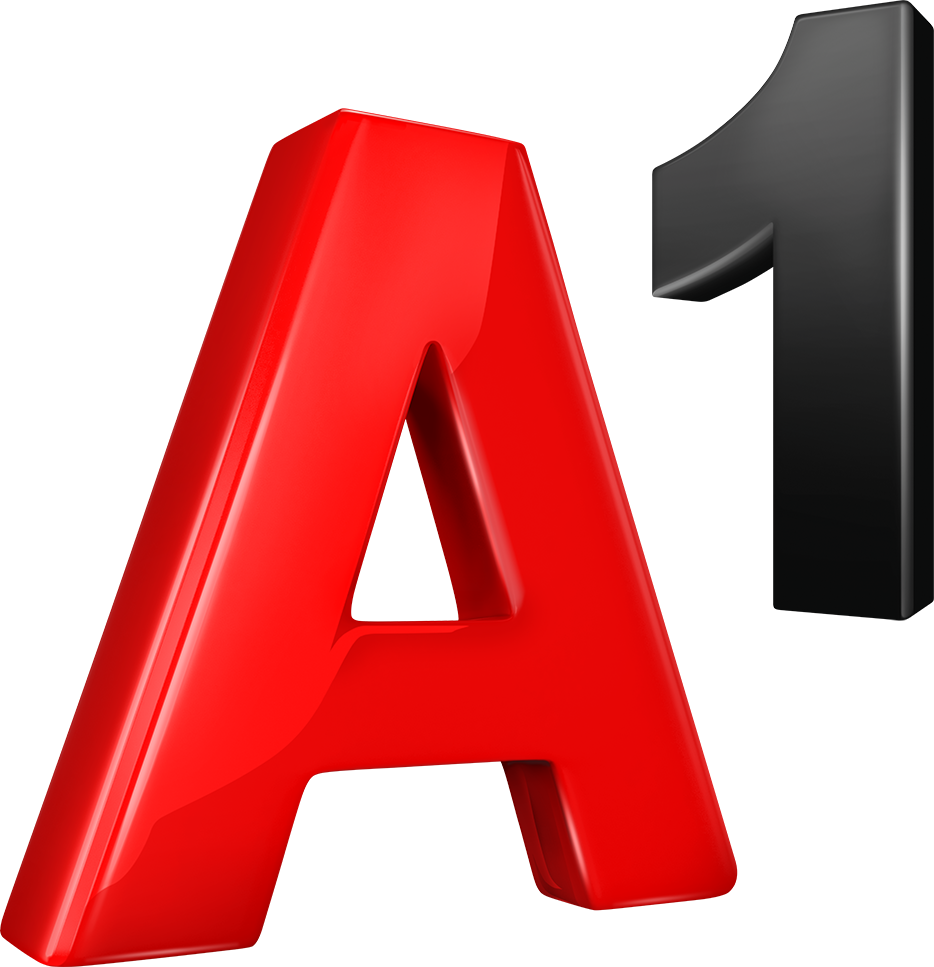
- Formerly: Si.mobil (1997–2017)
- Type: Subsidiary
- Industry: Telecommunications
- Founded: 1997; 29 years ago
- Headquarters: Ljubljana, Slovenia
- Key people: Dejan Turk, Larisa Grizzlo, Milan Zaletel
- Products: Fixed-line telephony; Mobile telephony; Broadband internet; Cable television; IPTV
- Revenue: ▲€209.9 million (2021)
- Net income: ▲€11.3 million (2021)
- Number of employees: 606 (2021)
- Parent: A1 Telekom Austria Group
- Website: www.a1.si

A1 Slovenija is a telecommunications company operating the second largest mobile network in Slovenia. Prior to April 2017, the company was known as Si.mobil.

== History ==
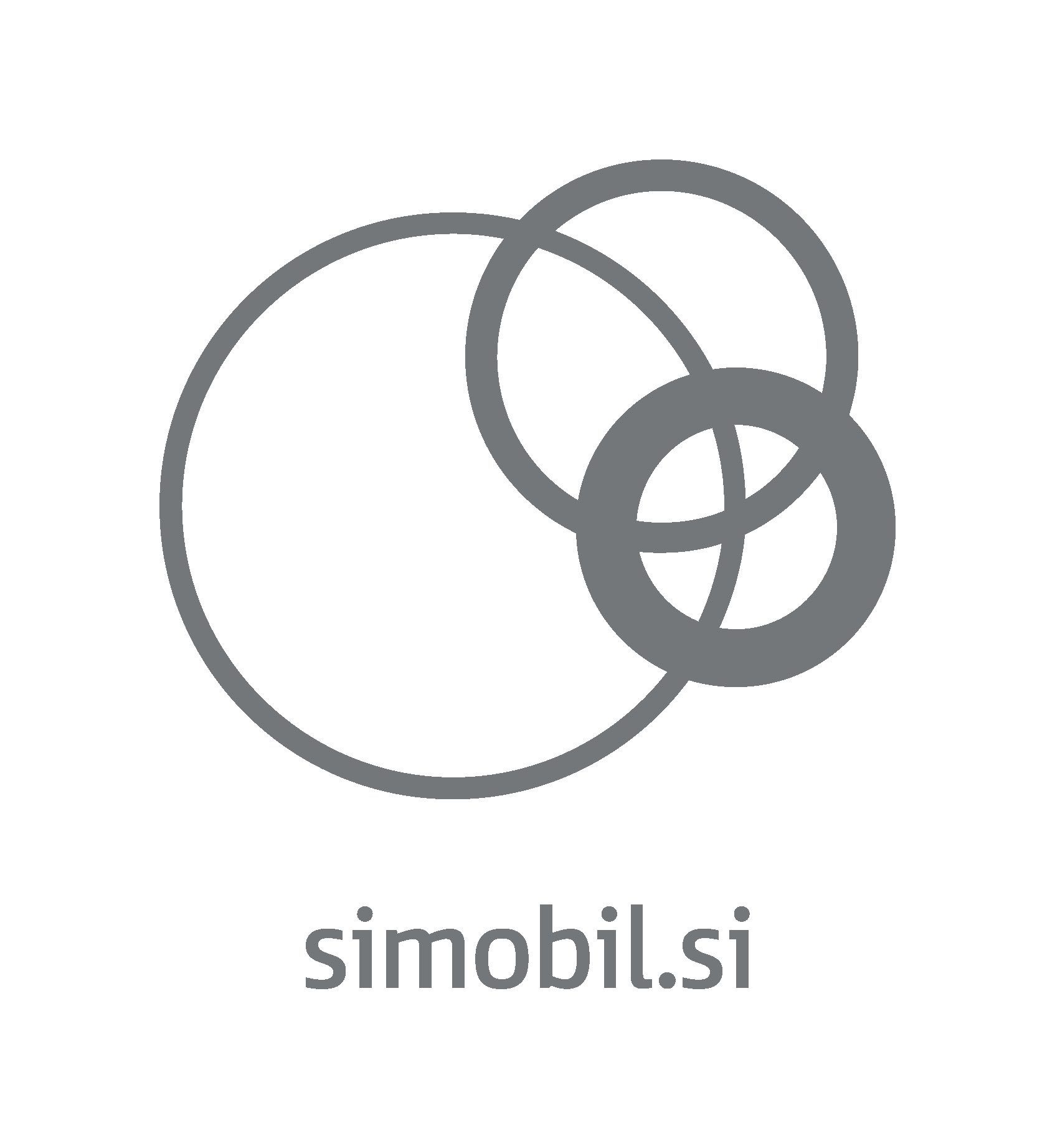
Logo as si.mobil (until April 2017)

The company was established in December 1997 and began operating in March 1999 as the first Slovenian private mobile operator. In 2000, the company was the second to market WAP, preceded by Mobitel.

After initial losses, the company's shares were in February 2001 purchased by Telekom Austria Group, making Si.mobil a part of a leading group of mobile service operators in Central and Eastern Europe. In June of that year, Si.mobil was the first in Slovenia and among the first in Europe to introduce GPRS to its customers. In 2002, it was the first company to market MMS.

An important step forward was signing a partnership agreement with Vodafone in January 2002. From September 2003, the company is presented under the dual brand Si.mobil - Vodafone [ˈsiːmɔbil ˈʋoːdafɔn].

In 2004, the company was one of the first operators worldwide to offer EDGE, and in 2006, they introduced its own UMTS/HSDPA network. In addition, Si.mobil offers other services like GPS on mobile phones, mobile office and mobile internet. In 2007, Si.mobil was the first Slovenian company to open its office in Second Life where they have built an island. In January 2008, it passed the milestone of 500,000 customers.

On July 8, 2010, mobilkom austria AG was merged with Telekom Austria TA AG. In the course of this merger, the non-Austrian subsidiaries of mobilkom austria AG were subordinated to the Telekom Austria Group. That is why Si.mobil has been a 100 percent subsidiary of the Telekom Austria Group since 2010. In 2017 the subsidiary was rebranded into A1 Slovenija. At the time of the takeover, it said it had over 700,000 customers. In June 2023, the company stopped using 3G network.
