= Prodigy (online service) =

Online service that operated from 1984 to 2001

Prodigy Communications, L.P.
- Type: Public
- Industry: Telecommunications
- Founded: February 13, 1984; 42 years ago (as Trintex)
- Fate: Defunct (part of AT&T Inc.)
- Headquarters: White Plains, New York, U.S. (earlier); Austin, Texas, U.S.
- Products: Telephone, Internet, television

Prodigy Communications Corporation was an online service from 1984 to 2001 that offered its subscribers access to a broad range of networked services. It was one of the major internet service providers of the 1990s.

The company claimed it was the first consumer online service, citing its graphical user interface and basic architecture as differentiation from CompuServe, which started in 1979 and used a command-line interface. Prodigy was described by the New York Times as "family-oriented" and one of "the Big Three information services" in 1994. By 1990, it was the second-largest online service provider with 465,000 subscribers, trailing only CompuServe's 600,000. In 1993 it was the largest.

In 2001, it was acquired by SBC Communications, which in 2005 became the present iteration of AT&T. The Mexican branch of Prodigy, however, was acquired by Telmex.

== Early history ==
The roots of Prodigy date to 1980 when broadcaster CBS and telecommunications firm AT&T Corporation formed a joint venture named Venture One in Fair Lawn, New Jersey. The company conducted a market test of 100 homes in Ridgewood, New Jersey to gauge consumer interest in a Videotex-based TV set-top device that would allow consumers to shop at home and receive news, sports and weather. After concluding the market test, CBS and AT&T took the data and went their separate ways in pursuit of developing and profiting from this market demand.

Prodigy was founded on February 13, 1984 as Trintex, a joint venture including CBS, computer manufacturer IBM and retailer Sears, Roebuck and Company. The company was headed by Theodore Papes, a career IBM executive, until his retirement in 1992. CBS left the venture in 1986 when CBS CEO Tom Wyman was divesting properties outside of CBS's core broadcasting business. The company's service was launched regionally in 1988 in Atlanta, Hartford and San Francisco under the name Prodigy. The marketing rollout plan closely followed IBM's Systems Network Architecture (SNA) network backbone. A nationwide launch developed by ad agency J. Walter Thompson and sister company JWT Direct followed on September 6, 1990.

Subscribers using personal computers initially accessed the Prodigy service over copper wire telephone "POTS" service or X.25 dialup. Prodigy employed 1,200 bit/s modem connections for its initial rollout and offered low-cost 2,400 bit/s internal modems to subscribers at a discount to provide faster service and stabilize the diverse modem market. The host systems used were regionally distributed IBM Series/1 minicomputers managed by central IBM mainframes located in Yorktown Heights, New York.

Thanks to an aggressive media marketing campaign, bundling with various consumer-oriented computers such as IBM's PS/1 and PS/2 as well as various clones and Hayes modems, the Prodigy service soon had more than one million subscribers. To handle the traffic, Prodigy built a national network of POP (points of presence) sites that made local access numbers available for most homes in the U.S. This significantly expanded the service because subscribers were not required to dial long distance to access the service. The subscribers paid only for the local call (usually free), while Prodigy paid for the connection to its national data center in Yorktown.

== Development ==
Under the guidance of Henry Heilbrunn, Prodigy developed a fully staffed 24/7 newsroom with editors, writers and graphic artists intent on building the world's first true online medium. The initial result was that Prodigy pioneered the concept of an online content portal—a single site offering news, weather, sports, communication with other members and shopping for goods and services such as groceries, general merchandise, brokerage services and airline reservations. The service provided several lifestyle features, including popular syndicated columnists, Zagat restaurant surveys, Consumer Reports articles and test reports, games for children and adults, in-depth original features called "Timely Topics", bulletin boards moderated by subject matter experts, movie reviews and email. Working with Heilbrunn in the early stages of Prodigy's design, Bob Bedard pioneered the business model for electronic commerce. Prodigy was the service that launched ESPN's online presence.

Prodigy quickly implemented application standard code modules loaded from diskette. These modules relied upon real-time tokenized data from Prodigy database servers to drive core Prodigy service functionality on local user PCs. This client-server design worked well; by staging application-specific and reusable common code modules on Prodigy end-user diskettes, millisecond "click-to-available-cursor" response times were achieved that were otherwise unachievable in 1986 over slow 1,200-to-2,400 bit/s modems.

The service was presented using a graphical user interface. The Data Object Architecture wrapped vector and incremental point graphics, encoded as per NAPLPS, along with interpretative programs written in the proprietary languages TBOL (Trintex Basic Object Language) and PAL (Prodigy Application Language). NAPLPS grew out of the Canadian Telidon project, becoming an international standard in 1983 after some extensions were added by AT&T Corporation. NAPLPS enabled the display of colors and graphics supporting electronic advertising, publishing and commerce. The initial emphasis was on DOS and later Microsoft Windows. After that, users could use the Apple Macintosh, but some Prodigy screens were not properly configured to the Mac standard, resulting in wasted space or partial graphics.

Prodigy's initial business model relied more on advertising and online shopping for cash flow than on monthly subscriptions. Subscribers were charged a flat monthly fee that provided unlimited access. Initially, a monthly rate was set for unlimited usage time and 30 personal messages. In addition, subscribers could purchase additional messages. Later, Prodigy divided its service into "Core" and "Plus" sections. Core section usage remained unlimited, but Plus sections were limited by usage time. Subscribers were afforded a monthly allotment of Plus time, but if that time was exceeded, the subscriber would incur additional charges based on usage time. A blue indicator in the bottom-right corner of the screen indicated the subscriber's section.

Prodigy's shopping applications initially underperformed relative to expectations. This was attributed to the company's misperception that online shoppers would pay a premium rather than expect discounts for merchandise and to the product's poor graphics that resulted from the limitations of current technology. Using the early NAPLPS graphic standard, rendering realistic images of products was impossible, presenting great difficulty for online merchants to market products.

Despite these challenges, Prodigy was primarily responsible for helping merchants such as PC Flowers become some of the earliest e-commerce success stories. However, revenue from advertising was limited.

By 1993, Prodigy was developing a network architecture now known as a content delivery network in which the network caches its most frequently accessed content as close as possible to the users. The company sold private versions of it within customers' private corporate networks.

== Price increases ==
Two of Prodigy's most popular services were its message boards and email. Because Prodigy's business model depended on rapidly growing advertising and online shopping revenue, email was initially developed primarily to aid shopping. However, it later found much greater usage as a means of general communication between users. The popularity of Prodigy's message boards caused users to remain connected to the service far longer than had been projected. This resulted in escalating expenses that adversely affected the service's cash flow and profitability.

To control costs and raise revenue, in January 1991, Prodigy modified its basic subscriber plans by allowing only 30 free email messages each month, while charging 25 cents for each additional email message, a policy that was later rescinded. In the summer of 1993, it began charging hourly rates for several of its most popular features, including its most popular feature, the message boards. This policy was later rescinded after tens of thousands of members left the service.

The price increases prompted an increase of "underground IDs" by which multiple users would share a single account and manipulate the email service to act as private bulletin boards. This was accomplished by sending emails to intentionally invalid addresses containing the name of the intended recipients. The service would return the emails, which were not billed, and users of the shared account would find the returned messages there. Replies were sent by entering the name of the first sender as the addressee, which would again trigger a return of the message.

Prodigy was slow to adopt features that made its rival AOL appealing, such as anonymous handles and real-time chat.

Eventually, the emergence of the Internet and the World Wide Web threatened to leave Prodigy behind.

== Conversion to a true ISP ==
In 1994, Prodigy became the first of the early-generation dialup services to offer full access to the World Wide Web and to offer Web page hosting to its members. However, since Prodigy was not an actual Internet service provider, programs that needed an Internet connection, such as Internet Explorer and the Quake multiplayer game, could not be used with the service. Prodigy developed its own web browser, but it compared poorly to other mainstream browsers in terms of features.

In 1995/1996, Prodigy hired Ed Bennett and Will Lansing. From 1995 through 1996, Prodigy unveiled several Internet-related products. It debuted its real-time chat area within the service, similar to AOL's. Access to Usenet newsgroups was made available and Prodigy's first web presence, Astranet, was released shortly afterward. Astranet was to be a web-based news and information service supported partly by advertising. However, the site was considered experimental and incomplete. Another innovation was Skimmer, a market trial ISP service that became the base for Prodigy Internet.

In 1996, with Gregory C. Carr as chair, the company retooled itself as a true Internet service provider, making its main offering Internet access branded as Prodigy Internet. This new service featured personalized web content, news alerts to pagers, and Java chat. At the same time, Prodigy deemphasized its antiquated proprietary interface and editorial content, which were relabeled as Prodigy Classic. Prodigy Classic was discontinued on October 1, 1999 because the aging software was not Y2K-compliant. The service had 209,000 members when it was discontinued.

== A public company ==
In 1996, Prodigy was acquired by the former founders of Boston Technology and their new firm International Wireless, with Mexican businessman Carlos Slim Helú, a principal owner of Telmex, as a minority investor. IBM and Sears sold their interests to the group for $200 million. It was estimated that IBM and Sears had invested more than $1 billion in the service since its founding.

Prodigy continued to operate as it had previously, while Telmex provided Internet access under the Prodigy brand in Mexico and other parts of Latin America, with some services provided by Prodigy Communications in the US.

Prodigy went public in 1999, trading on the NASDAQ under the symbol PRGY. Later that year, Prodigy entered a strategic partnership with SBC Communications by which Prodigy would provide Internet services and SBC would provide exclusive sales opportunities and network, particularly DSL, facilities. The strategic partnership also gave SBC a 43% ownership interest in Prodigy.

On November 6, 2001, SBC purchased 100% interest in Prodigy and brought it private. On November 14, 2001, SBC and Yahoo! announced the strategic alliance to create the cobranded SBC Yahoo!. Sometime after that, SBC ceased offering new Prodigy accounts, and customers were encouraged to migrate to the SBC Yahoo! product line while maintaining their existing Prodigy email addresses.

== Headquarters ==
Prodigy's first headquarters was in White Plains Plaza in White Plains, New York. Prodigy announced plans to renew its lease in August 1992, occupying all 340,000 square feet (32,000 m^{2}) of space in the building. In 1992, the facility had 1,000 employees.

In 2000, the company announced that it would move its headquarters to Austin, Texas in order to work more closely with SBC Communications. During that year, Prodigy leased 112,000 square feet (10,400 m^{2}) of space in the River Place Pointe building in northwest Austin; the building, then under construction, was scheduled to be completed in 2001. Prodigy moved its headquarters in December 2000.

== Innovation ==
Prodigy started with flat-rate pricing of $9.95. When Prodigy moved to per-hour charging for its most popular services in June 1993, tens of thousands of users left the service.

Prodigy, along with Quantum Link in 1986, was one of the first online services to offer a user-friendly GUI when competing services, such as CompuServe and GEnie, were still text-based. Prodigy used this graphical capability to deploy advertising, expecting it to result in a significant revenue stream.

Prodigy offered online banking, stock trading, advertising and online shopping before the World Wide Web became widely used, but was largely unable to capitalize on these first-mover advantages. Decades later, IBM, which now owns some of the original Prodigy patents, continues to sell licenses for basic ecommerce concepts.

Prodigy was a forerunner in caching data on and near users' personal computers to minimize networking and server expenses while improving the experience for users.

Prodigy's legacy architecture was novel at the time and anticipated much of current web-browser technology. It leveraged the power of the subscriber's PC to maintain the session state, handle the user interface and process applications formed from data and interpretative program objects largely pulled from the network when needed. At a time when distributed objects were handled by RPC equivalents, Prodigy pioneered the concept of returning interpretable, platform-independent objects to the caller for subsequent processing. This approach anticipated innovations such as Java applets and JavaScript. Prodigy also helped pioneer true distributed object-oriented client-server implementations as well as incidental innovations such as the equivalent of HTML frames and prefetching technology. Prodigy patented its inventions, which continue to be relevant and valuable.

== Growth ==
By 1994, Prodigy became a pioneer in selling "dial-up" connections to the World Wide Web and sold hosting services for web publishers.

Prodigy regularly became the focus of discussions on The Howard Stern Show in the mid-nineties.

As the company shifted from its focus on its exclusive "Prodigy Classic" content and started transitioning to "Prodigy Internet" as an ISP in the late 1990s, Prodigy found itself competing with many other lower-priced ISPs, and the price didn't support the value of the Prodigy Internet exclusive content available for members. In a letter to members, Prodigy explained that upgrades to Prodigy Classic to resolve its Y2K issues were just too expensive and that it felt investing in Prodigy Internet was the best long-term strategy, as many of the popular services offered by Prodigy Classic could be found elsewhere. This decision was consistent with what other online service providers (AOL, CompuServe, MSN) were doing at the time. Still, with these providers competing primarily on ease of ISP setup rather than exclusive content, the retention value was lost. Many members found more affordable ways to access the online content and services they were used to.

In 1999 the company, now led by a cadre of ex-MCI executives to turn the brand around, became Prodigy Internet, marketing a full range of services, applications, and content, including dial-up and DSL for consumers and small businesses, instant messaging, e-mail, and communities.

== Acquisition ==
In 2000, with subscriber growth exploding and brand attributes at an all-time high, Prodigy explored several partnership deals, including what would have been an unprecedented three-way merger with Earthlink and Mindspring. Ultimately, SBC bought a 43% interest in the company, and Prodigy became the exclusive provider to SBC's 77 million high-speed Internet customers. More than a year later after the launch of Prodigy Broadband (conceived and led by Chris Spanos), SBC bought controlling interest for $465 million when Prodigy was the fourth-largest Internet service provider behind America Online, Microsoft's MSN, and EarthLink. Prodigy in 2000 was reported to have 3.1 million subscribers, of which 1.3 million were DSL customers.

Attempts by SBC to sell the Prodigy brand became public knowledge on December 9, 2005.

In late 2006, SBC purchased AT&T Corporation and re-branded itself as AT&T Inc. As of early 2007, there remained within AT&T's Internet operations a small group of former Prodigy employees located in AT&T's Austin, Texas, and White Plains, New York, facilities. What had started 27 years earlier as an AT&T online experiment had come full circle.

Through 2009, the domain www.prodigy.net redirected to my.att.net, which appeared to be a Yahoo!-based content and search portal mainly linking to other online services.

AT&T stopped serving Prodigy-created webpages in 2011, severing yet another tie with the brand.

As of March 6, 2024, www.prodigy.net redirects to https://currently.att.yahoo.com.

== Prodigy in Mexico ==
In Mexico, Prodigy Internet is the main ISP with an estimated 92% of market share. It is also the leader in WiFi (hotspots) and broadband (DSL) access. The broadband service is called Prodigy Infinitum and is available in speeds of 512 kbit/s, 1024 kbit/s, 2048 kbit/s, 4096 kbit/s and 20480 kbit/s. The installation and DSL or fiber optic modem are free and it is no longer necessary to sign a two-year service contract. Prodigy Internet in Mexico is part of Telmex (Teléfonos de México) and its sister company Telnor (Teléfonos del Noroeste).

== The Prodigy Diaspora ==
The decline of Prodigy Services in the late-1990s created a corporate diaspora that heavily seeded the foundational layers of Silicon Alley. Prodigy was the first to bring together digital/internet engineering, design, media, and advertising talent in the New York City area. As Prodigy's market share declined, its executive leadership and product teams left to join or start early online efforts in New York City, accelerating the local commercial development of the early web.

This network of alumni was instrumental in establishing the consumer platforms, professional standards, and institutional funding mechanisms that defined New York's early tech sector:

- Pioneering Digital Media and Commerce: Scott Kurnit, who had led the team that integrated the first web browser into a consumer online service at Prodigy, applied these structural insights to found The Mining Company (later rebranded as About.com). Relying on human "Guides," it became one of early New York's most traffic-heavy and profitable web platforms. At the same time, content and community leaders like Lisa Simpson and Peter Glusker migrated to the CBS Internet Group to architect early digital properties, Chip Austin and Nick Gould brought their interactive expertise to Bertelsmann Online (BOL.com) in an early effort to challenge Amazon.
- Standardizing the Digital Advertising Industry: Having experimented with early versions of consumer targeted marketing inside Prodigy's closed network, alumni heavily drove New York's emergence as a global capital of digital media monetization. Scott Schiller went on to co-found the Interactive Advertising Bureau (IAB), establishing the standardized banner ad sizes and programmatic metrics that allowed early agencies and ad-tech firms—such as DoubleClick—to monetize web content at scale.
- Funding the Next Generation: The diaspora also fed the early venture capital ecosystem of Silicon Alley. Former Director of Finance Jerry Neumann joined Omnicom Group's Communicade, funding seminal New York digital agencies like Razorfish and Agency.com.

=== Key Alumni and Executive Careers ===
Prodigy Services Alumni in Early Silicon Alley (NYC)
Person	Role at Prodigy	Primary New York City Tech Destination	Role at Destination	Notable Historical Contribution
Scott Kurnit	Executive Vice President (1993–1995)	About.com (The Mining Company)	Founder, Chairman, and CEO	Led the team that integrated the first web browser into a consumer online service at Prodigy; built About.com into one of early NYC's most profitable web platforms.
Bill Day	Vice President, Internet (1987–1996)	Tremor Video	Founder & CEO	Founded Tremor Video, one of the earliest video ad networks. Tremor went public in 2013.
Jerry Neumann	Director of Finance (1995–1997)	Communicade (Omnicom Group) / Neu Venture Capital	Managing Director	Managed Omnicom's digital agency portfolio, providing vital early capital and strategic direction to foundational Silicon Alley agencies like Razorfish and Agency.com. Later founded Neu Venture Capital, backing New York City companies, including Datadog and BankSimple.
Lisa Simpson	VP, Content Strategy	CBS Internet Group / Sony Online Entertainment	Chief Operating Officer / President	Engineered some of the first major web-programming and content strategies for traditional media in New York.
Chip Austin	SVP, Sales and Business Development	Bertelsmann Online (BOL.com) / i-Hatch Ventures	President and CEO / Co-Founder and General Partner	Directed major e-commerce strategies before pivoting to early-stage venture capital, funding early Silicon Alley tech.
Peter Glusker	SVP, Content Programming and Business Development	CBS Internet Group / Gilt Groupe	Senior Vice President / Early Investor and Board Member	Scaled early content syndication models before backing high-growth luxury e-commerce platforms in Manhattan.
Nick Gould	Director of Online Communities	Bertelsmann Online (BOL.com) / Catalyst Group	Head of Business Development / Founder and CEO	Built early chat and user interaction models that heavily influenced user experience (UX) design agencies in the city.
Scott Schiller	VP, Advertising Sales	Interactive Advertising Bureau (IAB)	Co-Founder and Vice Chairman	Standardized the very first digital advertising formats and ad sizes, laying the foundation for NYC's dominant ad-tech ecosystem.
Inder Gopal	Chief Technology Officer	ReefEdge Inc. / Iptivia	Founder and CEO	Formed venture-backed businesses focused on local enterprise infrastructure, wireless routing, and deep corporate engineering.
Josh Grotstein	SVP, Content and Commerce	Citigroup E-Commerce / SAS Investors	Division Executive / Managing Partner and Co-Founder	Spearheaded early corporate online-banking integrations and co-founded institutional early-stage seed funds.

== Reception ==
Jerry Pournelle saw Prodigy demonstrated at the 1988 West Coast Computer Faire. He described the user interface as "pretty grim, simplified to the point of near imbecility ... No mouse support. It was all very slow". While acknowledging the potential for improvement, Pournelle said that "for $119.40 a year I'd rather have my local newspaper and the Wall Street Journal".

== See also ==
- AT&T Yahoo! – formerly SBC Yahoo!
- Stratton Oakmont, Inc. v. Prodigy Services Co.
- British Telecommunications plc v. Prodigy
