= A1 Telekom Austria Group =

Telecommunications company

Telekom Austria AG
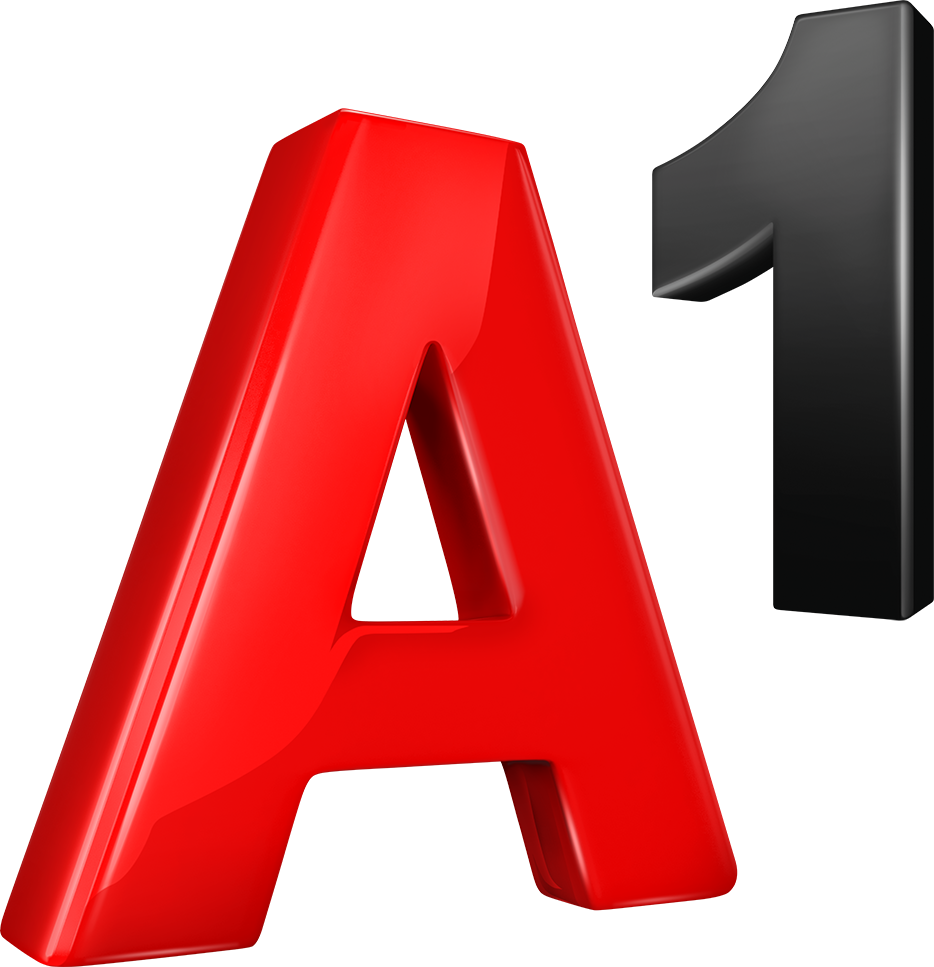
- Company type: Publicly traded subsidiary (Aktiengesellschaft)
- Traded as: WBAG: TKA
- Industry: Telecommunications
- Founded: 1998; 28 years ago
- Headquarters: Vienna, Austria
- Area served: Austria; Belarus; Bulgaria; Croatia; North Macedonia; Serbia; Slovenia
- Key people: Alejandro Plater (CEO); Thomas Arnoldner (Deputy CEO); Edith Hlawati (Chairman of the supervisory board)
- Products: Fixed-line telephony; Mobile telephony; Broadband internet; Digital television; IT services
- Revenue: ▲€4.74 billion (2021)
- Operating income: ▲€753.4 million (2021)
- Net income: ▲€455 million (2021)
- Total assets: ▲€8.572 billion (2021)
- Total equity: ▲€3.115 billion (2021)
- Owner: América Móvil (58%); ÖBAG (28.42%)
- Number of employees: 17,856 (2021)
- Parent: América Móvil (58%) (2014–present)
- Subsidiaries: A1 Telekom Austria; A1 Belarus; A1 Bulgaria; A1 Hrvatska; A1 Macedonia; A1 Srbija; A1 Slovenija
- Website: www.a1.group

Map of countries where the A1 Telekom Group operates as of 2025

A1 Telekom Austria Group is a provider of a range of fixed-line, broadband Internet, multimedia services, data, and IT systems, wholesale as well as mobile payment services. It is a subsidiary of Mexican telecommunications conglomerate América Móvil since 2014, and its headquarters are in Vienna. The company operates subsidiaries in seven European countries: Austria, Belarus, Bulgaria, Croatia, North Macedonia, Serbia, and Slovenia. Its largest subsidiary is the Austrian telecommunications provider A1 Telekom Austria.

== History ==
Previous logo (2013–2018)

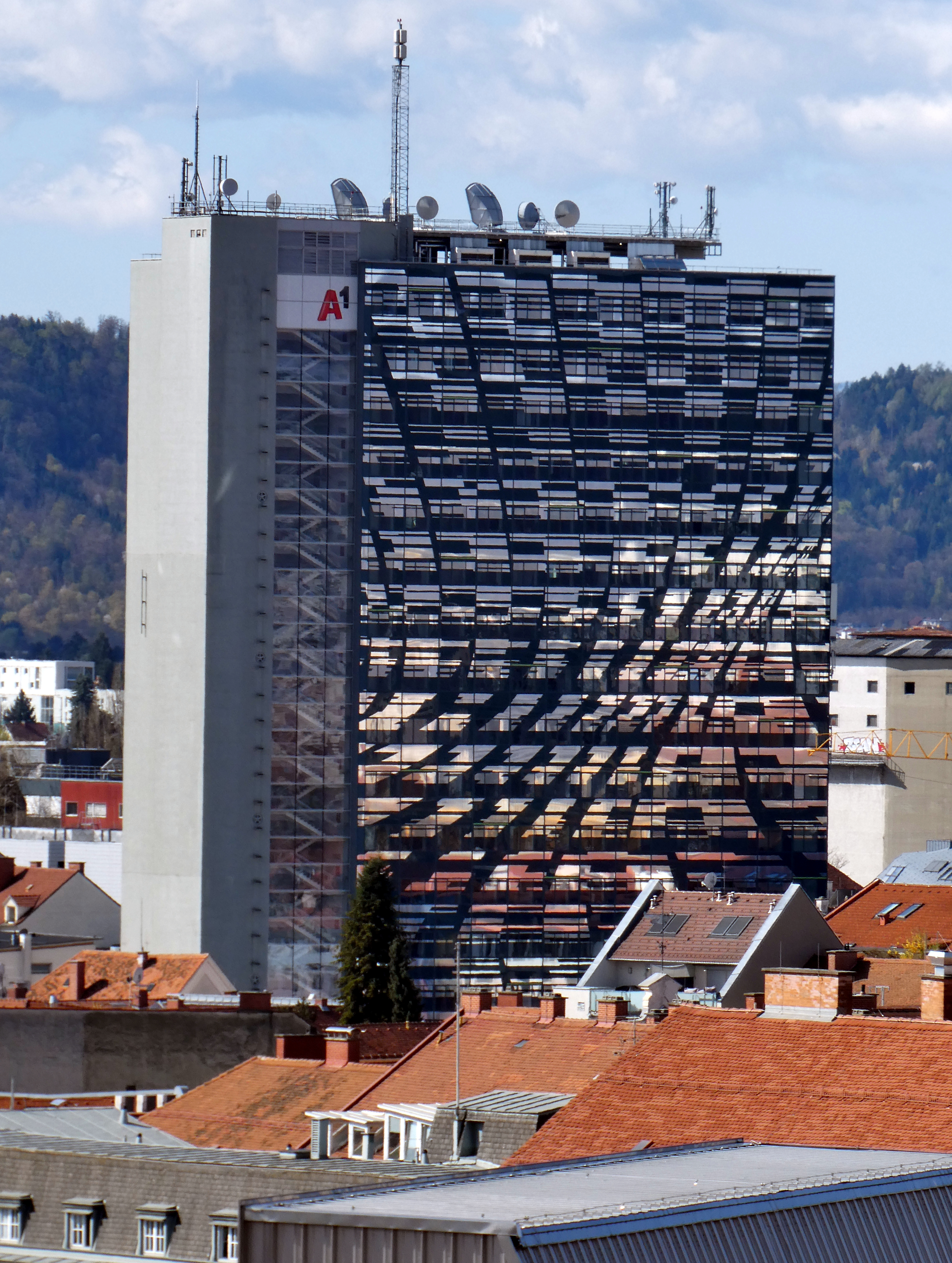
Premises in Graz

Telekom Austria's earliest predecessor, the state-owned PTT agency k.k Post- und Telegraphenverwaltung, was formed in 1887 when all telephone and mail services in Austria-Hungary were taken over by the state. After World War I, the Austrian portion of the company became simply Post- und Telegraphenverwaltung (PTV, ÖPT).

In 1996, with the passage of the Post Restructuring Act, PTV was restructured as a public corporation, Post-und Telekom Austria AG (PTA AG). Only two years later, the telecommunications sector was fully deregulated and PTA was split, with the telecom side becoming Telekom Austria. The company was fully privatised in 2000 and was listed on the Vienna Stock Exchange and the New York Stock Exchange (it delisted from the latter in 2007).

In June 2000, the company invested about 15 million euros to rebrand itself as Jet2Web. However, Jet2Web failed to succeed in the market, because it was perceived as unreliable. The use of the name was discontinued in 2002, and the company name Telekom Austria was revived as the brand name with a new logo.

In June 2006, the company was split into the holding company Telekom Austria Group, with the public switched telephone network becoming Telekom Austria FixNet AG, which was later renamed Telekom Austria TA AG. In doing so, Telekom Austria FixNet AG became a sister company of affiliate Mobilkom Austria AG.

Both merged in 2010 to form A1 Telekom Austria. Foreign subsidiaries of Mobilkom Austria were transferred to the holding company, so that A1 Telekom Austria would only deal with the Austrian market.

In 2011, misdemeanours by company directors between 2004 and 2006 became public, erupting into a scandal known as the Telekom Austria Affair.

As of the end of 2022, Telekom Austria Group had 17,906 employees and generated about €5 billion in revenues.

On 14 November 2017, Telekom Austria Group was rebranded to A1 Telekom Austria Group as part of adopting their one brand strategy. The legal entity Telekom Austria AG still remains.

In 2020, all shares of Telecom Liechtenstein (FL1) were sold to the Principality.

== Stakeholders ==
On 23 April 2014 Carlos Slim, owner of America Movil, took control of Telekom Austria by forming a syndicate agreement between ÖIAG and America Movil, spending as much as $2 billion to buy out minority shareholders and investing up to 1 billion euros ($1.38 billion) into the company. America Movil sees Telekom Austria as a "platform for expansion into Central and Eastern Europe". Labour representatives boycotted the decision on the syndicate agreement at the ÖIAG supervisory board meeting for 12 hours criticising lack of explicit job guarantees.

== Subsidiaries ==
A1 Telekom Austria Group operates the following subsidiaries:

- A1 Telekom Austria
- A1 Belarus
- A1 Bulgaria
- A1 Croatia
- A1 Macedonia
- A1 Serbia
- A1 Slovenia

== Controversy ==
A1 Telekom reduced mobile Internet bandwidth in Minsk during 2020 Belarusian protests at the request of Belarusian officials.

== See also ==
- TDO connector – the standard telephone plug type used in Austria
