= Ricardo Bueso =

Guatemalan businessman and politician

Ricardo Bueso is a Guatemalan businessman and politician.

== Biography ==
In the early 1990s, he served as Guatemalan Ambassador to Belize under President Jorge Serrano Elías. In 1996, he bought the newly privatized telecommunications firm TELGUA, now known as Claro Guatemala. In 2003, he ran for President as a member of the Democracia Cristiana Guatemalteca political party, but withdrew.
