= A1 Belarus =

Telecom, ICT & content service provider in Belarus

Unitary enterprise A1
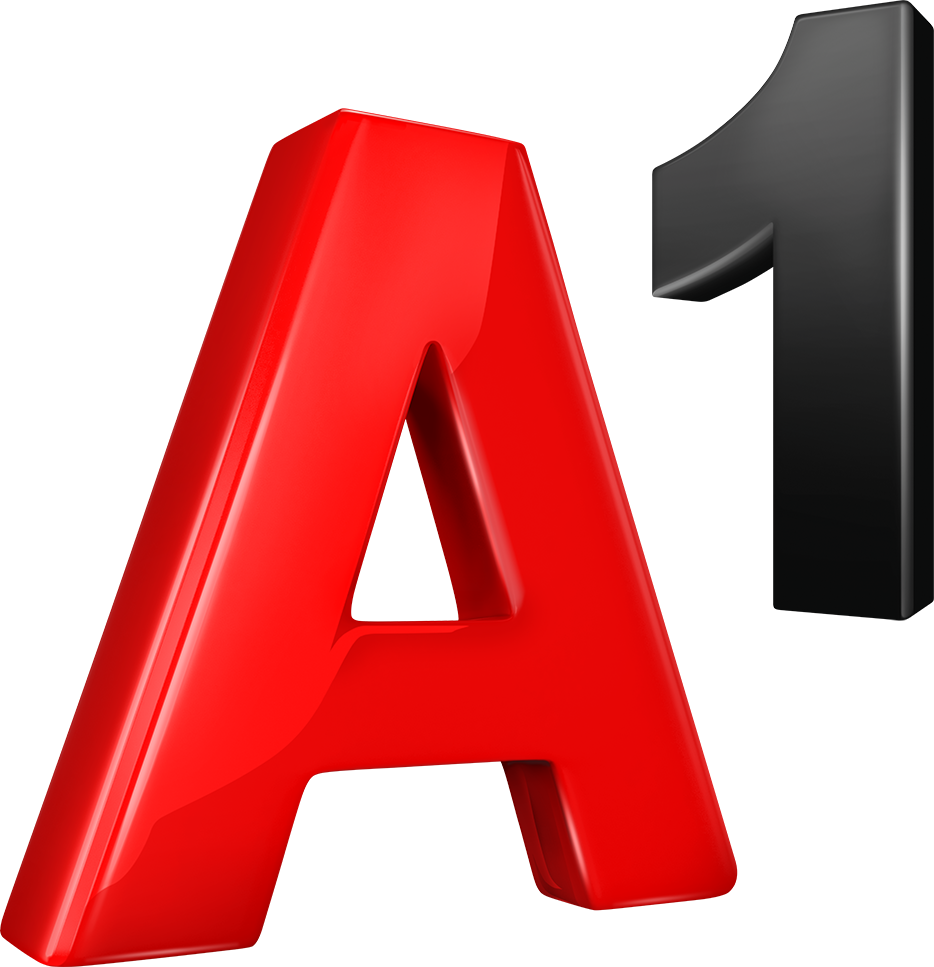
- Formerly: Mobile digital communication JV LLC, Unitary Enterprise velcom
- Type: Subsidiary
- Industry: Telecommunications
- Founded: 30 July 1998; 28 years ago (commercial activities from 16 April 1999)
- Headquarters: Minsk, Belarus
- Key people: Helmut Duhs (CEO)
- Products: Fixed-line telephony; Mobile telephony; Broadband; Internet services; Digital television (IPTV)
- Brands: A1, VOKA
- Revenue: ▲€419.5 million (2021)
- Operating income: ▲€122.3 million (2021)
- Net income: ▲€86.2 million (2021)
- Number of employees: 2,334 (2021)
- Parent: A1 Telekom Austria Group
- ASN: 42772
- Peering policy: Open
- Traffic Levels: Not disclosed
- Website: a1.by

Unitary enterprise A1 (Belarusian: Унiтарнае прадпрыемства «А1», A1) is the largest private telecom, ICT & content service provider in Belarus. The company provides GSM 900/1800, UMTS (WCDMA/HSDPA/HSUPA/HSPA+) and 4G (via beCloud) services. A1 is the second-largest mobile network operator in Belarus. A1 also provides ADSL, Ethernet and GPON Internet access services in all regional centers of Belarus, as well as in Babruysk, Zhlobin, Rechytsa, Svyetlahorsk and Dobrush, and IPTV digital television services under the VOKA brand. Until August 2019, the company conducted operations under the brand name velcom.

== History ==
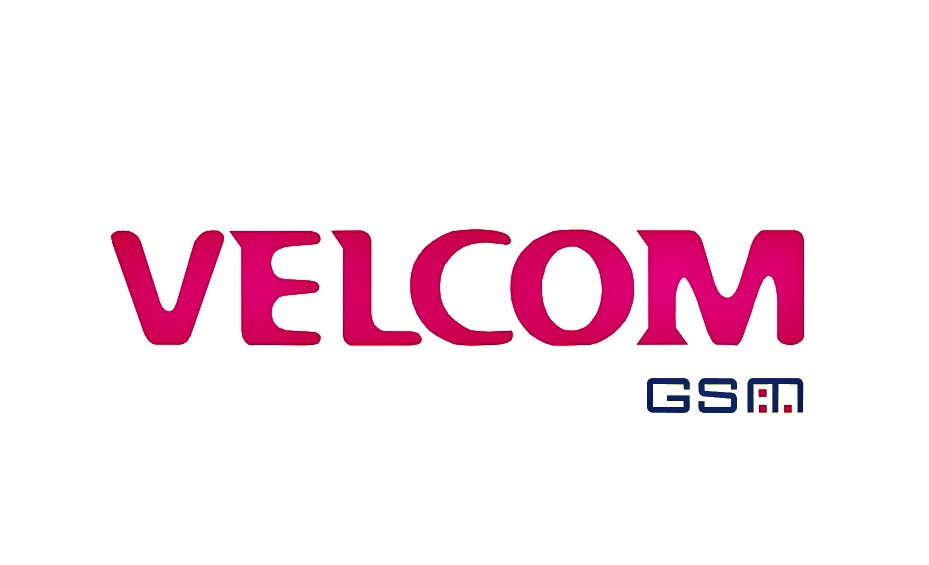
Company's logo before rebranding in 2008

The company began commercial operations to provide mobile communications services and sell mobile communications devices on 16 April 1999 under the brand name JV LLC Mobile digital communication, and became the first GSM carrier in Belarus (the country's first cellular operator was the NMT carrier BelCel).

Ten base stations (nine in Minsk and one in Arešniki on the way to the National Airport Minsk) had been launched by the time commercial operations started. By the summer of 2000, all regional cities of Belarus had been connected to the network. Mobile communications services were available on the Minsk-Brest-Orša highway and in settlements along the road. Since 23 April 2007, mobile communications have been available to 100% of Belarus's urban population. In April 2019, the operator launched the first GSM network in the Polesye State Radiation-Ecological Reserve.

On 15 March 2001, the operator subscribers were enabled to send and receive texts (SMS), and in 2005, Multimedia Messaging Service (MMS) became available.

On 2 June 2003, the carrier launched the GPRS service. In December 2005, EDGE technology became available in three regions of Belarus.

On 30 March 2006, the company became the country's first carrier to start testing the third generation of wireless mobile telecommunications technology. The 3G network was rolled out in only 27 days. The commercial operation of the 3G network in Minsk and Homieĺ started on 17 March 2010. In February 2016, the company became the country's first carrier to launch a 3G network in the 900 MHz band, and in May 2019, it further improved the capacity of its 3G network being the first operator to add a fourth RF carrier in the 2100 MHz band to its base stations.

velcom logo in 2008—2019

In November 2007, the company became part of A1 Group as a result of the acquisition of 70% (in November 2007) and then the remaining 30% (in October 2010) of shares. Starting in June 2019, A1 subscribers will be able to use the Internet at domestic prices in the networks of the A1 Group operators.

In May 2008, the company had a rebranding campaign, changing its logo and name to Unitary enterprise velcom.

In May 2009, the carrier signed an exclusive agreement with LLC JV BelCel on the provision of CDMA2000 broadband Internet access services (EV-DO Rev.A). The services were provided up until 16 May 2013.

In 2014, VOKA digital television was launched, construction of the company's proprietary data center began and the official online store was unveiled. In May, 2020 the company expanded online trade chains and opened the first online shop.

In 2017, the company was licensed to commercially launch Belarus's first Narrow Band Internet of Things (NB-IoT) network.

Since April 2018, velcom subscribers have benefited from making Wi-Fi calls using the VoWiFi (Voiceover Wi-Fi or Wi-Fi Calling) technology. In December 2019, А1 was the first in the country to implement the VoLTE (Voice over LTE) technology.

In the summer of 2018, velcom in partnership with JSC Reshenie Bank and Visa international payment system launched the virtual V-BANKING (rebranded A1 Banking in August 2019) card to pay for a broad range of services. In November 2020 А1 and Visa entered into a Strategic Partnership Agreement in order to develop digital financial services in the country, and to extend financial facilities of А1 banking application.

On 21 March 2019, A1 started to provide data services using 4G technology. By the end of 2019, 4G network has become available to A1 subscribers in all major cities in the 1800 MHz band. In December 2019, the company announced about three-year strategic partnership with infrastructure operator beCloud aiming to develop 4G mobile communications standard in Belarus. Starting from 2020, A1 will provide its infrastructure for base stations, as well as transport network based on hybrid communications lines, radio relays and fibre optic lines to make 4G network in the 800 MHz band available in rural areas. From August 2020 to March 2022, due to a new radio-frequency band, 4G network coverage expanded up: in Gomel Region to 96.4% in Mogilev Region to 81%, in Minsk Region to 89%, in Vitebsk Region to 75%, in Brest region to 67%, in Grodno region. In November 2022, A1 began using the new 2600 MHz frequency range for about 1.5 thousand LTE base stations of the infrastructure operator beCloud.

On 8 April 2019, the company announced a rebranding campaign. It had been using the dual brand velcom | A1 in communications between April and August 2019. The single brand A1 is used since 12 August 2019.

In April 2019, the company started providing free Wi-Fi Internet access in 18 electric trains of Belarusian Railway.

From April to May 2019 А1 provided mobile communication for all tunnels of the Maskoŭskaja and Aŭtazavodskaja lines of Minsk Metro, in November 2020 the communication became available on Zelenoluzhskaya line. As of December 2024, A1 has provided mobile communications at stations on the third line of the Minsk Metro.

On 12 August 2019, the company launched virtual eSIM cards and in the same November gave opportunity to transfer to online eSIM in the user account. In 2021, it became possible to become a subscriber of the company remotely through registration of an eSIM-card in the mobile application "My A1", including number porting from other networks.

In August 2019 А1 presented the first smartphone under its own trade mark — А1 Alpha, in July 2020 А1 Alpha 20+ went on sale.

On 12 November 2019, A1 took part in signing a joint Belarusian-Austrian Declaration on strengthening cooperation in the sphere of communications, IT technologies and 5G technology development. A1 has applied for frequency allocation subject to the international standards of 5G and is currently developing the architecture of the 5G network. On 22 May 2020 A1 brought in test mode the first 5G SA network in Belarus in operation, created on the basis of standalone architecture. On 25 May 2020 the first call in Belarus and the CIS was made on this network using the VoNR technology.

A1 was the second company in the country, which began to sell SIM cards for self-registration in the partner network stores on 12 May 2021.

In June 2023, A1 was the first company in the country to launch a second carrier frequency in the 900 MHz range. This made it possible to almost double the capacity of the existing 3G network within the coverage area of the second carrier in the Minsk, Vitebsk and Mogilev regions. As of the end of 2024, A1 specialists have commissioned 1,057 cells operating at a frequency of 900 MHz as part of the UMTS-900 coverage expansion.

In April 2024, A1 provided 4G connectivity in the Minsk metro (at all existing stations and in the stretches between them). The project was implemented in partnership with the infrastructure operator beCloud.

== Owners and management ==
Prior to January 2005, Cypriot SB Telecom controlled 69.9% of shares in velcom, CJSC Beltechexport and Republican Unitary Enterprise Beltelecom had 30% and 0.1%, respectively. In January 2005, the state bought into the company: it acquired a 30.9% stake, whereas SB Telecom had 49%, Beltechexport 20%, and Beltelecom 0.1%.

In August 2007, SB Telecom increased its shareholding to 100%, paying U.S. $556 million.

At the beginning of October 2007, Austria's A1 Telekom Austria Group signed a purchase agreement to buy 70% in the carrier from SB Telecom, and in October 2010, it bought the remaining stake of 30%.

Helmut Duhs is the CEO of A1 as of 2025.

== Operations ==
=== Mobile communications ===
A1 provides GSM 900/1800, UMTS (WCDMA/HSDPA/HSUPA/HSPA+) and 4G services in Belarus.

==== Subscriber numbers ====
- +375 29 1 xx xx xx, +375 29 3 xx xx xx, +375 29 6 xx xx xx, +375 29 9 xx xx xx
- +375 44 4 xx xx xx, +375 44 5 xx xx xx, +375 44 7 xx xx xx

Due to the introduction of the Mobile number portability (MNP) service in the Republic of Belarus, subscriber numbers can be as follows: +375 25 xxx xx xx, +375 29 xxx xx xx, +375 33 xxx xx xx.

=== Fixed-line communications ===
The company started building its own fiber-optic network for its corporate customers in September 2014.

In 2016–2018, velcom completed a series of transactions to acquire Belarusian Internet service providers – Atlant Telecom (Minsk), Aichyna Plus (Minsk), Belinfonet (Minsk), Garant (Gomel and Vitebsk), Ranak Media (Svetlogorsk). Furthermore, Business Network (Delovaya Set) Internet provider transferred most of its private and some corporate subscribers to velcom (Minsk).

As of 30 September 2024, A1's fixed-line subscriber base was approximately 945.9 users. Most of the operator's Internet access rates are package offers, i.e. they imply simultaneous subscription to digital television services under the VOKA brand.

=== Video service VOKA ===
Video service from A1 is available under the VOKA brand. A1's fixed-line Internet users benefit from the IPTV service and enjoy 142 channels (including 60 HD channels). VOKA is also available in the networks of other mobile and fixed-line operators with the use of the OTT technology and offers 130 television channels (including 60 HD channels). VOKA features diverse interactive functionality: pause, fast forward and reverse, archives of TV shows, as well as the function to continue watching on another device. Also available to all users are movies, cartoons and series provided by online streaming services START, more.tv, Premier, viju, The Walt Disney Studios, Warner, Marvel, Fox movies and cartoons. The service is accessible from Android and iOS mobile devices, Smart TV running on Tizen, WebOS, Android TV, on RedboxMini, Xiaomi Mi Box 3, Apple TV (via AirPlay) boxes. Desktop users can access the video service via the VOKA application for Windows or on the website.

In 2018, the VOKA service began to feature exclusive content of its own production: the VOKA local section with reviews, documentaries, mini-reality films and TV shows; the "Sports" section with broadcasts of matches involving Belarusian clubs and national teams; live broadcasts of concerts, music festivals, cybersports tournaments, conferences and forums. Also available to users is the "CINEVOKA" section, which contains well-known movies, cartoons, serials in professional voice-over in the Belarusian language. Some of them have been exclusively translated and dubbed at the request of the video service.

On 28 January 2019, the VOKA video service presented the country's largest Ultra-High-Definition (4K) content library[.

==== VOKA Smartfilm ====
Since 2010, A1 in conjunction with the Ministry of Culture of the Republic of Belarus has held the annual mobile film festival. In 2016, it became an international event. Every year, the film festival sees the number of entrants and countries grow consistently. In 2020, the ninth International Mobile Film Festival VOKA Smartfilm took place, with its competitive program encompassing 356 short-length films from 75 countries.

==== Esports ====
In February 2020, the Belarusian Esports Federation Republican Public Association was established and registered with the assistance of A1. On 17 April 2020 the Belarusian Computer Sport Association (BCSA) was registered. BCSA members are 11 companies representing the Belarusian Esports industry. Association was created to promote esports in Belarus, develop and support professional players, coaches and referees, hold competitions and further international contacts.

On 4 May 2020 the first cybersport mobile online games match was held on the A1's 5G SA test network. While testing, the data transfer speed was 1.2 Gbit/s, ping speed 10 milliseconds.

=== Data centre and ICT services ===
In September 2017, A1 launched one of the largest Belarusian data processing centers (DPC) in Minsk. Four DPC modules are designed for 800 server racks and have their own optical ring with a bandwidth of 1 Tbit/s. As of June 2018, the first module with 200 server racks was put into operation.

The A1 data center has an international Uptime Institute (UI) certificate for Tier III fault tolerance in the Design and Facility categories, as well as a PCI DSS certificate confirming the customer infrastructure security and payment card data protection.

In March 2019, the data center received a compliance certificate with national information security requirements. In August 2019, the company confirmed compliance with the international standard ISO 27001, and in May 2020 — with the state standard of the Republic of Belarus ISO/IEC 27001-2016. In September 2020, the company received an information security work and services license to provide information security for safety-critical systems (SCS). In October 2020, A1 received the status of a platinum partner of Kaspersky Lab.

Currently, the data center provides the following services: cloud solutions rental (IaaS, private clouds, "Oblako-62"), server and network equipment placement (Colocation, HaaS), ICT services and solutions (Baas, Veeam Cloud Connect, DRaaS, Oracle integrated technical support, etc.), IT consulting, Remote Office, as well as subscription-based use of Microsoft software products.

Since 1 April 2021, the A1 Unitary Enterprise has transferred the rights and obligations under a number of contracts for the provision of ICT services to the new company - A1 ICT Services. A1 ICT Services LLC operates under the A1 brand and is registered as a High-Tech Park resident.

=== Solar power plant ===
In 2016, A1 launched its own solar power plant in the Gomel Region, Solar II, connected to the Bragin substation. The plant covers an area of 41 hectares and has a nominal capacity of 18.48 MW and consists of 85 thousand solar panels. During 5 years of operation, the equipment of the solar park generated 129,360,452 kWh of clean electricity.

In October 2017, velcom launched the first solar-powered base communications station in Belarus in the Luban District of the Minsk Region.

== Statistics ==
As of 30 September 2024, the company had more than 4.959 million mobile subscribers. Some 945.9 users were subscribed to fixed-line Internet and TV services. The company's share in the country's mobile communications market stood at 41,6%.

2G is available on 97.7% of the territory of the country with 99.9% of the population (100% of urban residents). 3G is available on 97.1% of the country's territory. As of June 2010, the company operated 3,301 base stations and 28,754 transmitter receivers in 1,360 settlements across the country, as well as eight switches: three in Minsk and one in each regional center.

The company's subscribers benefit from international roaming services in 191 countries of the world in 382 carriers' networks. The A1 unitary enterprise has its own network of digital service centers, consisting of more than 80 stores. The dealer network includes more than 500 mobile shops throughout the country.

Year	2007	2008	2009	2010	2011	2012	2013
Wireless Subscribers, mln (Mobile Market Share)	3,059 (43,4%)	3,698 (44,8%)	4,102 (42,7%)	4,354 (41,9%)	4,620 (41,1%)	4,800 (43,5%)	4,947 (42,5%)
Mobile Penetration	71,5%	85,1%	99,4%	109,6%	118,8%	116,6%	123,0%
Year	2014	2015	2016	2017	2018	2019	2020
Wireless Subscribers, mln (Mobile Market Share)	4,950 (42,4%)	4,956 (42,5%)	4,945 (43,2%)	4,864 (42,5%)	4,873 (42%)	4,890 (41,8%)	4,916 (42,0%)
Mobile Penetration	123,3%	123,0%	120,3%	120,5%	122,4%	123,8%	
Fixed Access Lines (Internet and TV service users), mln	–	–	0,279	0,463	0,657	0,616	0,627
Year	2021	2022	2023				
Wireless Subscribers, mln (Mobile Market Share)	4,938 (42,2%)	4,895 (41,5%)	4,897				
Mobile Penetration							
Fixed Access Lines (Internet and TV service users), mln	0,651	0,790	0,891				

The company's revenue (according to international financial statements) for the third quarter of 2024 reached EUR 322.3 million, EBITDA was at EUR 122.5 million.

In 2023, the company's revenue amounted to EUR 442.2 million, EBITDA – EUR 191.9 million.

Year	Revenues, € mln	EBITDA, € mln	EBITDA Margin	Operating Income, € mln	Capex
2011	260,9	106,6	40,9%	−255,2	44,9
2012	301,2	124,4	41,3%	29,5	43,7
2013	331,7	155,9	47,0%	71,6	34,0
2014	355,0	172,4	48,6%	82,2	48,5
2015	332,2	163,7	49,3%	86,6	66,1
2016	321,0	151,5	47,2%	87,8	73,7
2017	390,5	181,3	46,4%	123,1	47,1
2018	389,3	163,8	42,1%	87,6	49,7
2019	426,1	190,9	44,8 %	100,7	105,1
2020	402,6	172,8	42,9 %	109,3	26,8
2021	419,6	180,5	43,02 %	122,4	40,4
2022	460,8	218,8	47,5 %	155,5	38,6
2023	442,2	191,9	43,4 %	138,7	25,3

== Corporate social responsibility ==
The list of A1 priorities as a socially responsible business includes assistance to children, support for national self-identification and the environment.

=== Helping children ===
A1 has supported people with autism since 2015. In 2016, the "i" Family Inclusive Theatre was established at the Pushkaryova Studio as a joint initiative of Children. Autism. Parents international charity and velcom | A1. The carrier provides financial and informational support for the project as its general partner. Since 2016, velcom | A1 has been involved in the annual international campaign Light It Up Blue held on 2 April to support people with autism.

In 2015-2019 the company held annual charity events #velcombegom. The aim of the project is to help children's medical institutions, promote healthy lifestyles, and popularize running. During its implementation to the beneficiaries of the action (various children's medical institutions) were transferred more than 700,000 Belarusian rubles of financial aid. In 2018, the campaign "Running Cities" #velcombegom won the International competition of communication projects Eventiada IPRA Golden World Awards 2018 in the category for the best project in the field of healthy lifestyles.

The I see! project has been implemented by company since 2016 till 2020 in cooperation with the Belarusian Children's Fund with the support of the Ministry of Health of the Republic of Belarus. The objective of the project is to assist in the timely diagnosis and detection of early visual impairments in school-age children residing in rural areas. Over the past four years, 35 ophthalmologists visited 693 schools in the Mogilev, Gomel, Brest and Vitebsk regions and tested 51,474 schoolchildren. When the project was close to its conclusion, the "I See!" graphic novel was prepared and published with the participation of the Modern Comics creative association.

In September 2019, А1 became a general sponsor of Junior football school. The sponsorship involves several directions for development of children and youth sport, including creation of the A1 Junior brand and purchase of the new equipment for the club's players.

On December 28, 2019 A1 was the general partner of the Viennese Ball held in the Palace of Independence. Following the results of the event, the company provided financial assistance to the civic association “SOS Children's Villages Belarus”.

On 23 June 2020 A1 started the charitable sport action “100 hours with А1”. Following the results of the action, A1 provided financial assistance to the Republican children palliative medicine clinical center. On June 1, 2021, the second season of “100 gadzin z A1” campaign, connected with the theme of ecology, was launched. As a result of the A1 action, 50,000 rubles were transferred to the International Public Organization SOS-Children's Villages. The allocated funds were used to install 300 solar panels and an air heat pump in the Mogilev SOS-Children's Village. Now it is expected to plant an alley with named trees of active participants of the action on the territory of the Borovlyany SOS-Children's Village.

On 20 August 2023, the A1 company held a sports and music charity festival "U adnym rytme z A1" at the Dynamo stadium in Minsk. Thanks to the participants in various sports activities following the event, A1 provided sponsorship to the Republican Center for the Rehabilitation of Disabled Children for the purchase of high-tech innovative diagnostic equipment.

=== Support for the Belarusian language and culture ===
In 2016–2019, the company conducted a joint project with Kinakong, entitled Belarusian Weekends. During that period, more than 20 movies were translated and dubbed into Belarusian. More than 50,000 viewers have enjoyed these movies in Belarusian in more than 60 movie theaters of the country.

In 2018-2019, A1 held a social and educational project velcom YOUTH for high school students with communication in Belarusian. More than 800 high school students from 230 educational institutions across the country took part in the project.

Since 2019, A1 has been holding a project "Pershyaya", in which high school students from all over Belarus present ideas on the topics of technology, culture, ecology, inclusion, and urbanism. There is also a special educational program for the participants. Every year the finalists of the competition are given the opportunity to prepare their ideas for presentation to a wider audience together with mentors.

In 2019–2020, A1 became the general partner of the 100th season of the Yanka Kupala National Academic Theatre. The partnership helped organize a free live broadcast of the theatre's iconic performances via the VOKA video service, including "Radio Prudok", "Two Souls", "The People of the Marsh","Paulinka"and other.

In October 2019, A1 together with the Belarusian-Jewish Cultural Heritage Center and the Museum of the History of the Vitebsk People’s Art College launched the project #UNOVIS100 in honor of the 100th anniversary of the UNOVIS art association. On 15 February 2020, the National Art Museum of Belarus opened Belarus’s first ever exhibition of the suprematist artist Lazar Khidekel "We Will Be Understood in 100 Years".

On 21 February 2020 A1 presented the project "LANGUAGE" ("МОВА"), in terms of which interactive art installations are being set up in the biggest cities of the country. From May till December, sculptures in form of letters which serve as street furniture and make up together the word МОВА were installed in Gomel, Brest, Mogilyov, Vitebsk and Grodno. The project is being implemented in liaison with the initiative "Native language nobility".

=== Ecology ===
In June–July, 2020, the competition "Sunlight energy for the Green schools" was held, an ecological project by A1 in cooperation with the Ministry of natural resources and environment protection of the Republic of Belarus, Ministry of education of the Republic of Belarus, and the UN Development Program in Belarus. As a result of this contest, 7 "Green schools" were chosen, one from each Belarusian region and form Minsk. By December 2020 the company completed installation of solar panels at education institutions, which won the contest.

In 2021, in accordance with the principles of sustainable environmental, social and corporate governance (ESG), A1 launched a large-scale initiative to achieve carbon neutrality: it introduced natural cooling technologies for base station equipment and upgraded power supply installations at technological facilities.

On 16 April 2021, the "А1garod" project was launched. The eco-friendly space (a vegetable garden) appeared on the roof of the A1 headquarters in Minsk. The company implements the concept of an energy-efficient "green office", minimizes the use of paper, introduces electronic document management and conducts separate collection and sorting of garbage.

In 2022, all A1 stores will organize their own collection system for electronic equipment for subsequent transfer for safe disposal, which will reduce the impact on the environment globally.

In May 2024, A1 released the first environmental comic for children and teenagers. An educational series of stories tells about how everyone can take care of the environment. In October 2024, a new part of the ecological comic was presented - "Eva and Seva. On the other side of the screen".

In November 2024, A1 took part in a charity event aimed at restoring forest areas affected by a natural hurricane. The company's employees have planted more than five thousand trees to help the forests of the Kalinkovichi region recover faster.

=== Digital literacy ===
In October 2020 А1 launched voluntary project #яонлайн (IAmOnline). The project goal is to help in teaching people, who want to become confident users of the mobile Internet.

In 2021, A1 and UNFPA (United Nations Fund for Population Activities) launched an educational program for improvement of digital literacy of older people. In June 2021, the #ionline mobile technology guide was launched. From July to September in all regions of Belarus there was #ionline-training for volunteers in offline and online format. In 2022, a new program was developed and launched with methodological recommendations for education, including people with disabilities.

In November 2024, A1 launched the nationwide information campaign #Think5seconds. The aim of the project is to inform and raise awareness of a large number of people about fraud problems, methods of protecting their data and Internet security. Since the launch of the A1 #Think5seconds campaign, more than 1,000 participants, including social workers, "silver" volunteers and older people, have successfully completed online training on how to avoid fraud when using a smartphone.

== Work of A1 during the COVID-19 pandemic ==
In March, 2020 A1 started the initiative #оставайсяонлайн (#stayonline) in order to support its subscribers and the population as COVID-19 spread.

Since the onset of the pandemic, the company provided financial assistance to several hospitals, provided medical professionals with smartphones and free on-duty mobile communication. The company has created a USSD-number and a short number for philanthropic contributions in favour of medical workers, free calls were made to the hotline of the Ministry of Health on issues of coronavirus infection.

== Criticism and security ==
Austrian investors have been accused of ingratiating themselves with "Europe's last dictator" for good business since 2007. The 2010 Belarusian presidential election resulted in the 2010 Belarusian protests, which were brutally suppressed, but it later emerged that protesters had been spied on by the authorities using their cell phone data. A1 has always emphasized that it had not actively passed on any customer data: "In contrast to most other countries, any access to personal and call data takes place without a court order and without the involvement of the mobile network operator," it said at the time.

In July 2016, the human rights organization Amnesty International accused A1 Belarus of involvement in spying on Belarusian citizens. According to a report by human rights activists, the company provides the Belarusian authorities with virtually unlimited access to its clients' conversations and their data. A1 Telekom Austria Group responded to the allegations by referring to the fact that it only complies with the country's law.

According to the son of Mikola Statkevich's wife, on the eve of the celebration of the 100th anniversary of the Belarusian People's Republic in March 2017, the operator blocked the smartphones of the Belarusian politician Mikola Statkevich and transferred his passwords for Facebook and Viber. A1 did not respond to the allegations.

On 23 August 2020, during a rally in Minsk, all Belarusian mobile operators had problems with mobile Internet. According to A1 it happened at the request of government bodies for national security purposes. Later on the same day data transmission services were restored to the fullest extent. On 26 August the company warned subscribers in advance of similar problems. The cyclic blackouts of the Internet continued in the following weeks and months. In the report of the Belarusian human rights organization "Human Constanta," such termination of work was equated with a violation of human rights, because it actually is “the dispersal of a peaceful demonstration, just online.”

On 21 September 2020 the European Telecommunication Network Operation Association (ETNO) made a statement with regard to cutting off the Internet access in Belarus. It also contains a public position of A1 Telekom Austria Group: "А1 in Belarus is unable to provide communication services without access to the external channel monopolised by the state — voice communication and data transmission both at national and international levels are controlled by authorised government bodies".

A prominent A1 critic is Veronika Tsepkalo. She worked for many years at "velcom" in sales and corporate customer departments and said in October 2020: "I don't think it's right that a company from the EU so obviously supports Lukashenko and his non-democratic values. There is no other way of calling their behavior when they turn off the mobile internet every Sunday. What is A1 doing to distance itself from this bloody regime?" In October 2020 the International coalition #KeepItOn published an open letter with an appeal to Belarusian suppliers of telecommunication services to counteract the cutting off the Internet access. The response from А1 was as follows: “Restriction of access to the Internet services is in the best interests of neither the company, nor its clients. However, as in any country, where A1 Telekom Austria Group operates, the company is obliged to comply with local legislative and regulatory requirements. In the event of non-compliance with such requirements, consequences of their implementation may be much more extensive”. The law "On Amendments to the Law of the Republic of Belarus 'On Telecommunications'" entered into force in May 2021. The failure of the operators to comply with the requirements of the Operational and Analytical Center on the suspension or restriction of the functioning of communication networks shall be considered a gross law violation, and the radio frequency spectrum application permit may be suspended.

== See also ==
- List of mobile network operators in Europe
