= Telmex =

Mexican telecommunications company

Teléfonos de México, S.A.B. de C.V.

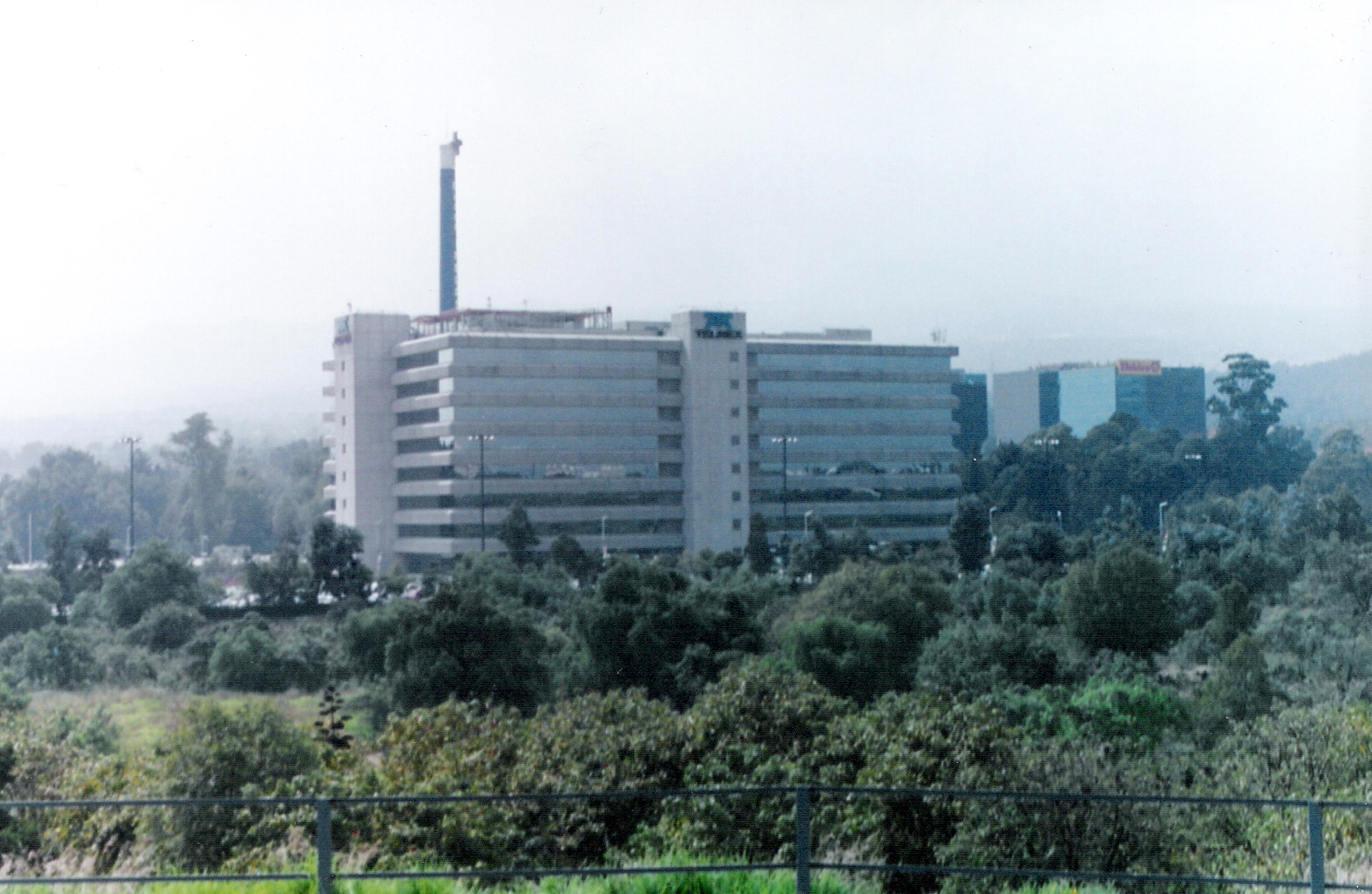
- Headquarters in Cuauhtémoc, Mexico City
- Formerly: Teléfonos de México, S.A. (1947–1980); Teléfonos de México, S.A. de C.V. (1980–2006)
- Type: Subsidiary
- Industry: Telecommunications
- Founded: January 1, 1947; 79 years ago
- Headquarters: Cuauhtémoc, Mexico City, Mexico
- Key people: Carlos Slim (chairman); Hector Slim Seade (CEO)
- Products: Telephone, internet, data, hosted services, television
- Number of employees: 52,346 (2010)
- Parent: América Móvil
- Website: www.telmex.com

Teléfonos de México, S.A.B. de C.V., known as Telmex is a Mexican telecommunications company headquartered in Mexico City that provides telecommunications products and services in Mexico. In 2014, Telmex was the dominant fixed-line phone carrier in Mexico. In addition to traditional fixed-line telephone service, Telmex offers Internet access through their Infinitum brand of Wi-Fi networks, data, hosted services and IT services. Telmex owns 90 percent of the telephone lines in Mexico City and 80 percent of the lines in the country. Telmex is a wholly owned subsidiary of América Móvil.

== History ==
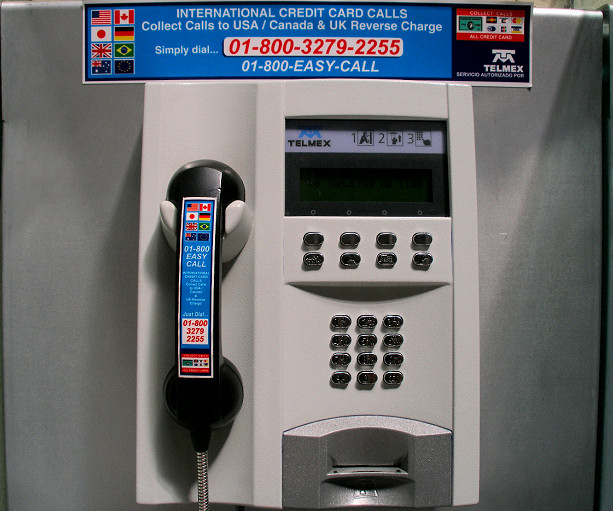
A Telmex public pay phone

Telmex was founded in Mexico the January 1, 1947; 79 years ago, when a group of Mexican investors bought Swedish Ericsson's Mexican branch. In 1950, the same investors bought the Mexican branch of the ITT Corporation, thus becoming the only telephone provider in the country. In 1972, the Mexican government bought the company.

In 1990, Telmex was bought by a group of investors formed principally by Carlos Slim Helú, France Télécom, and Southwestern Bell Corporation, whose tender was the largest. However, controversially, the payment itself took place over the course of the next several years, using revenues from the phone service.

After privatization, Telmex began investing in new modern infrastructure, creating a partial fiber optic network throughout the nation, thus offering service to 30% of the Mexican territory.

In 1991, the Mexican government sold its remaining stock in Telmex.

== Cellphone mobile unit ==
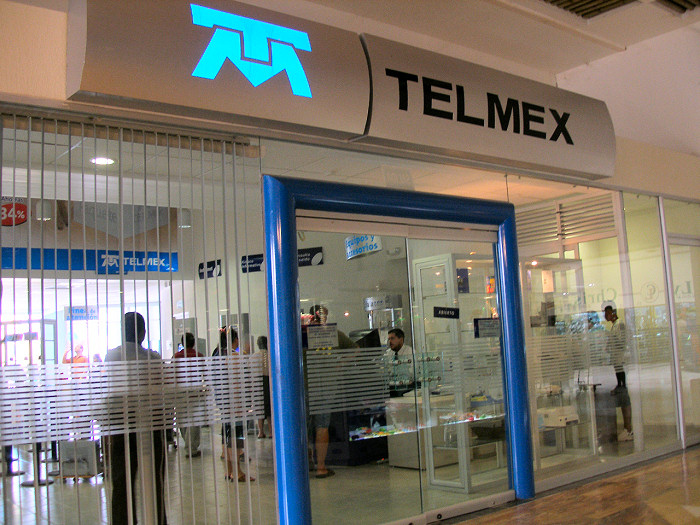
A Telmex retail store

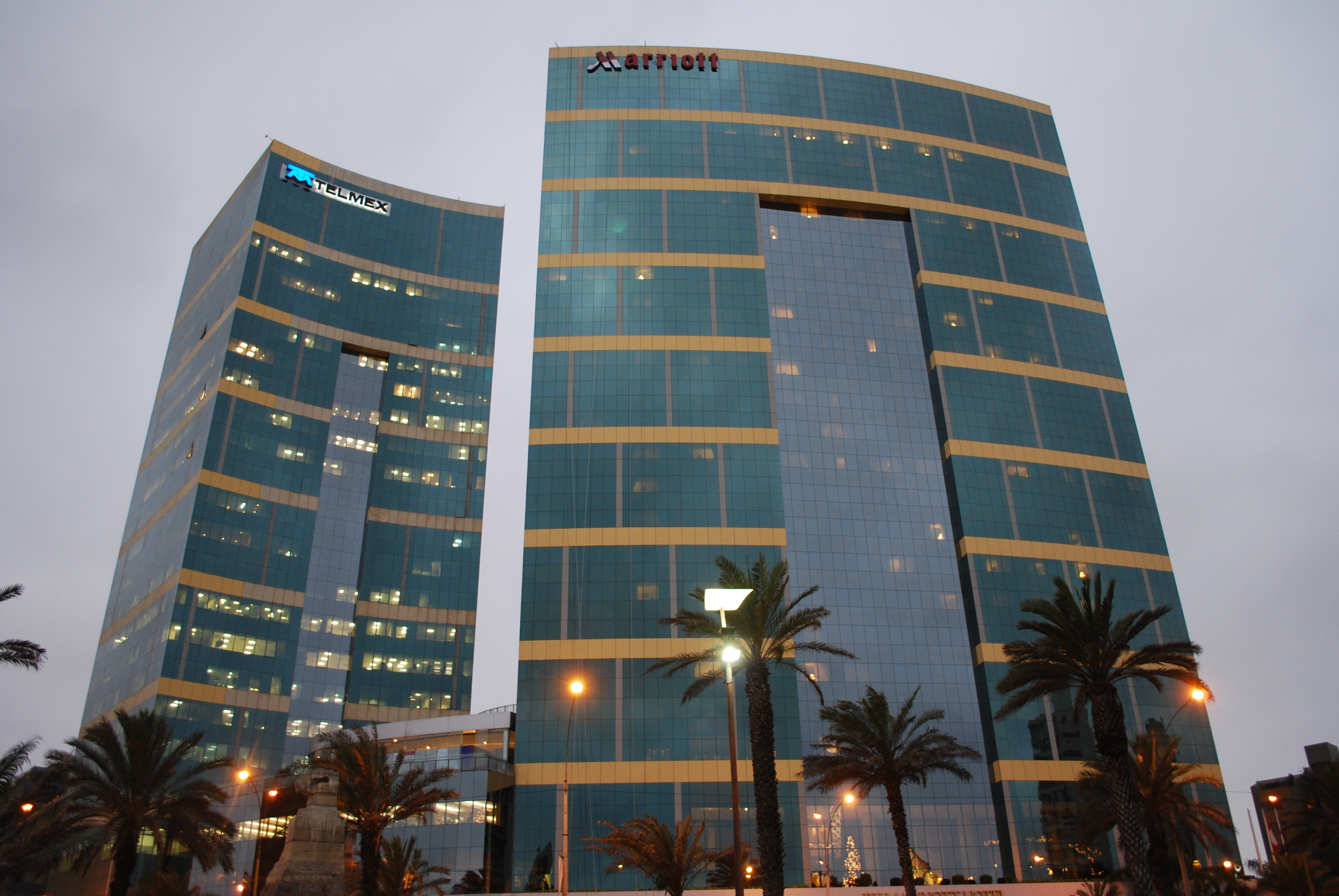
Telmex advertising - JW Marriott Hotel Lima

In the 1990s, Telmex formed a subsidiary Radio Móvil Dipsa to provide mobile communications under the brand Telcel.

In 2000, Telmex spun off their mobile unit, creating América Móvil, which controls Radio Móvil Dipsa. It started with 80% of the mobile market.

In 2010, America Móvil (an independent company from its former parent company, Telmex) bought 60% of Telmex, paying over 23 billion dollars. In 2011, America Móvil purchased the remaining 40% of Telmex. In August 2012, America Móvil started the process to de-list Telmex from the Mexican Stock Exchange.

== Internet ==
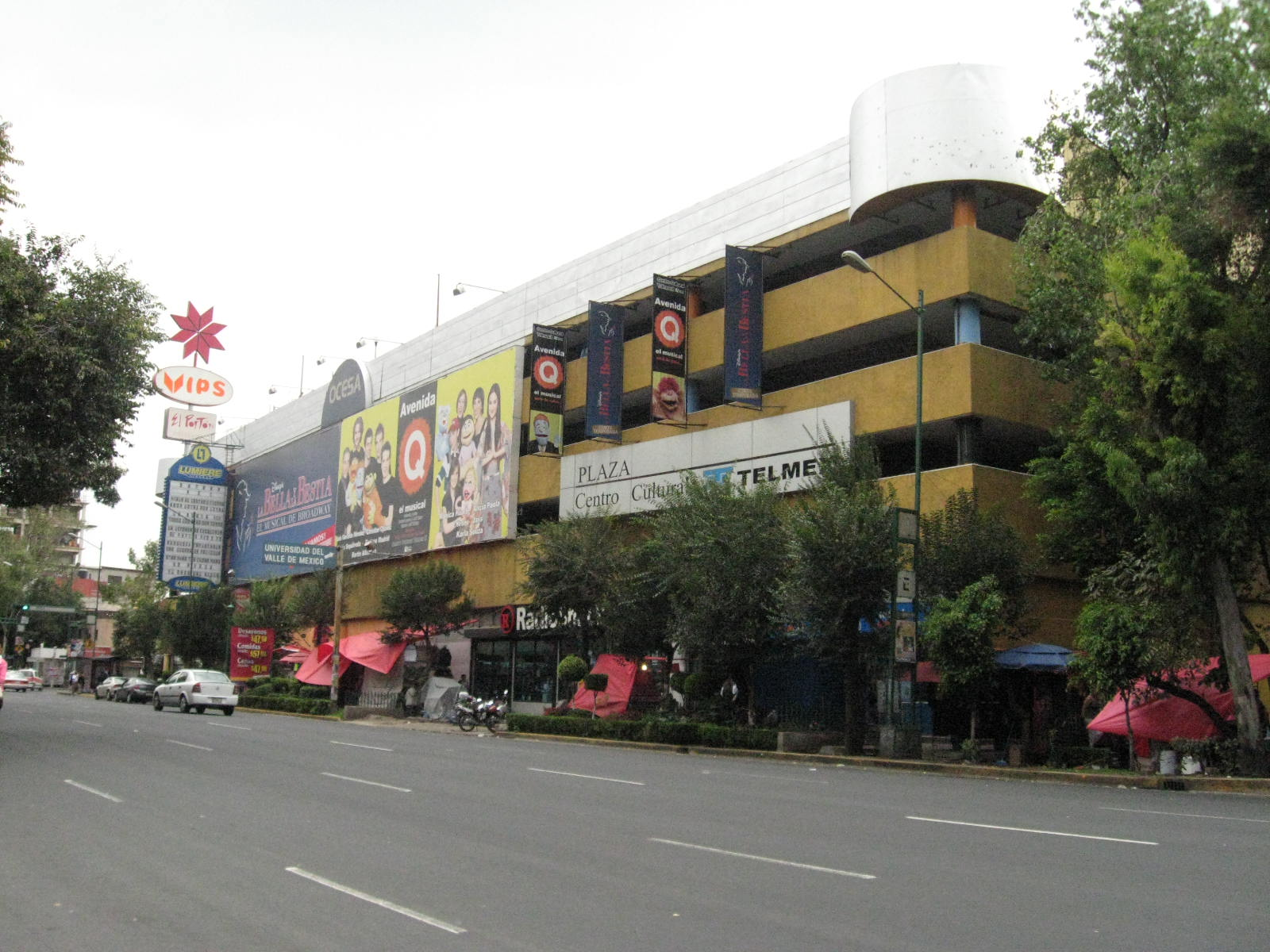
View of the Centro Cultural Telmex, located on Avenida Chapultepec near Metro station Cuauhtemoc in Mexico City

In the mid-1990s, Telmex began providing Internet access as an Internet service provider (ISP) with the brand Uninet. A year later, the brand was changed to Telmex Internet Directo Personal (Telmex Direct Personal Internet). In 1996, Telmex bought Prodigy Communications and took the brand to Mexico, renaming the service Prodigy Internet de Telmex. Thanks to their national coverage, Telmex rapidly became the leading national ISP. As of 2005, Telmex holds more than 80% of the market as an ISP, and is also the leader in broadband access with its brand Prodigy Infinitum (ADSL).

In 2001, Telmex sold the U.S. branch of Prodigy Communications to SBC, which was dubbed SBC Prodigy. However, Telmex continues to own and operate Prodigy in Mexico. In 2004, Telmex claimed that the number of users of Prodigy Internet grew by 190%.

Telmex dropped the Prodigy name from its advertising in 2009, replacing it with the "Infinitum" brand of Telmex internet services since that year. The name Prodigy is still used in the Mexican local site of MSN.

== Television ==
Telmex owns TV UNO and Claro Sports.

Over the past 25 years, Telmex has repeatedly sought regulatory authorization to enter the pay-TV market. However, in 2022, Mexico’s Federal Telecommunications Institute (IFT) rejected its application. The rejection reflected concerns that allowing Telmex to offer pay-TV services could further strengthen Telmex market power by giving it a competitive advantage over established television providers, and undermining competition in the Mexican telecommunications sector.

== Long-distance competition ==
In the mid-1990s, AT&T Corporation and WorldCom (MCI), among others, began operating in Mexico, representing for the first time serious competition to Telmex.

== Expansion ==
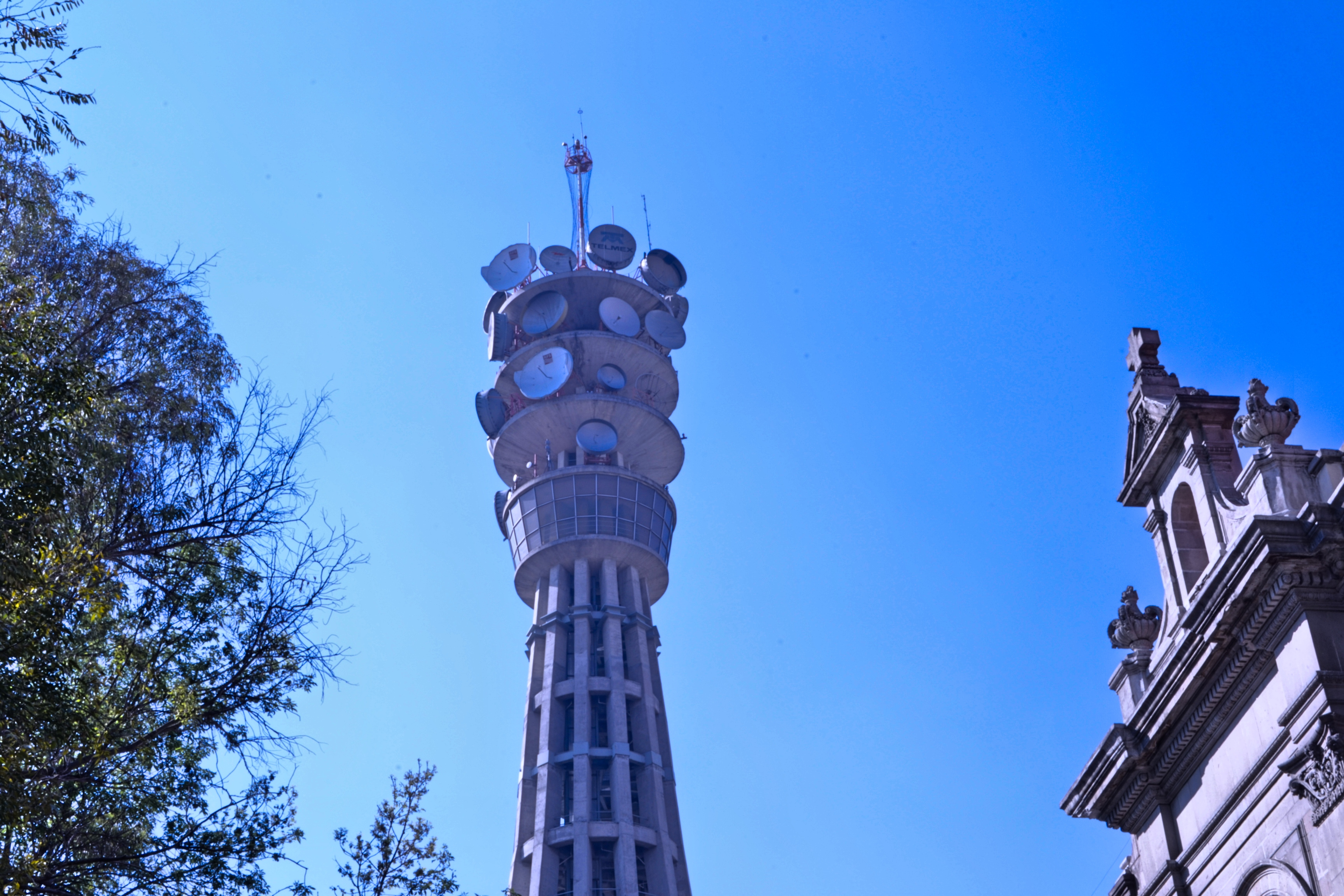
Telmex Tower, Mexico City.

After spinning off América Móvil, Telmex started an expansion plan, which started with the purchase of Guatemala's Telgua. Later, Telmex bought former state-owned phone companies in Central America, and began operations in the US with Telmex USA.

In 2004, Telmex went into a shopping spree for undervalued operators in South America, including the purchase of AT&T's Latin American operations, giving it presence in Colombia, Venezuela, Peru, Paraguay, Chile, Argentina, Brazil, and Uruguay, and increased reach in the United States. In the same year, Telmex bought from MCI Brazil's largest and most important long-distance operator, Embratel, acquired Chile's Chilesat, took control of Argentina's Techtel (operating in Argentina and Uruguay), of which it already owned 60%, by purchasing the remaining 40% from the Techint group, and purchased Argentina's Metrored. In the US, Telmex bought 13.4% of bankrupt MCI.

At the same time, sister company America Movil pursued a similar strategy by acquiring cellular operators CTI Movil in Argentina and Uruguay, Claro in Brazil and Peru, Porta in Ecuador and Comcel in Colombia.

In 2005, Telmex sold its holdings in MCI to Verizon.

As of January 2006, Telmex continued buying assets in Latin America and in the USA.

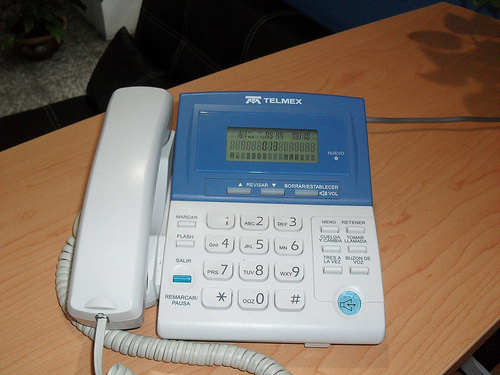
Telmex phone with display to identify calls and send messages.

In March 2006, there were rumors that Telmex was buying Verizon operations in the Caribbean. The reports said that the operation can include the wireless operation on each market. The total amount of this sale was estimated at nearly US$300 million.

In November 2006, an American embassy cable listed Telmex as among "Mexico's monopolists", with a 95% share of landlines. Its sister company Telcel was listed with a market share of 80% of cellular service.

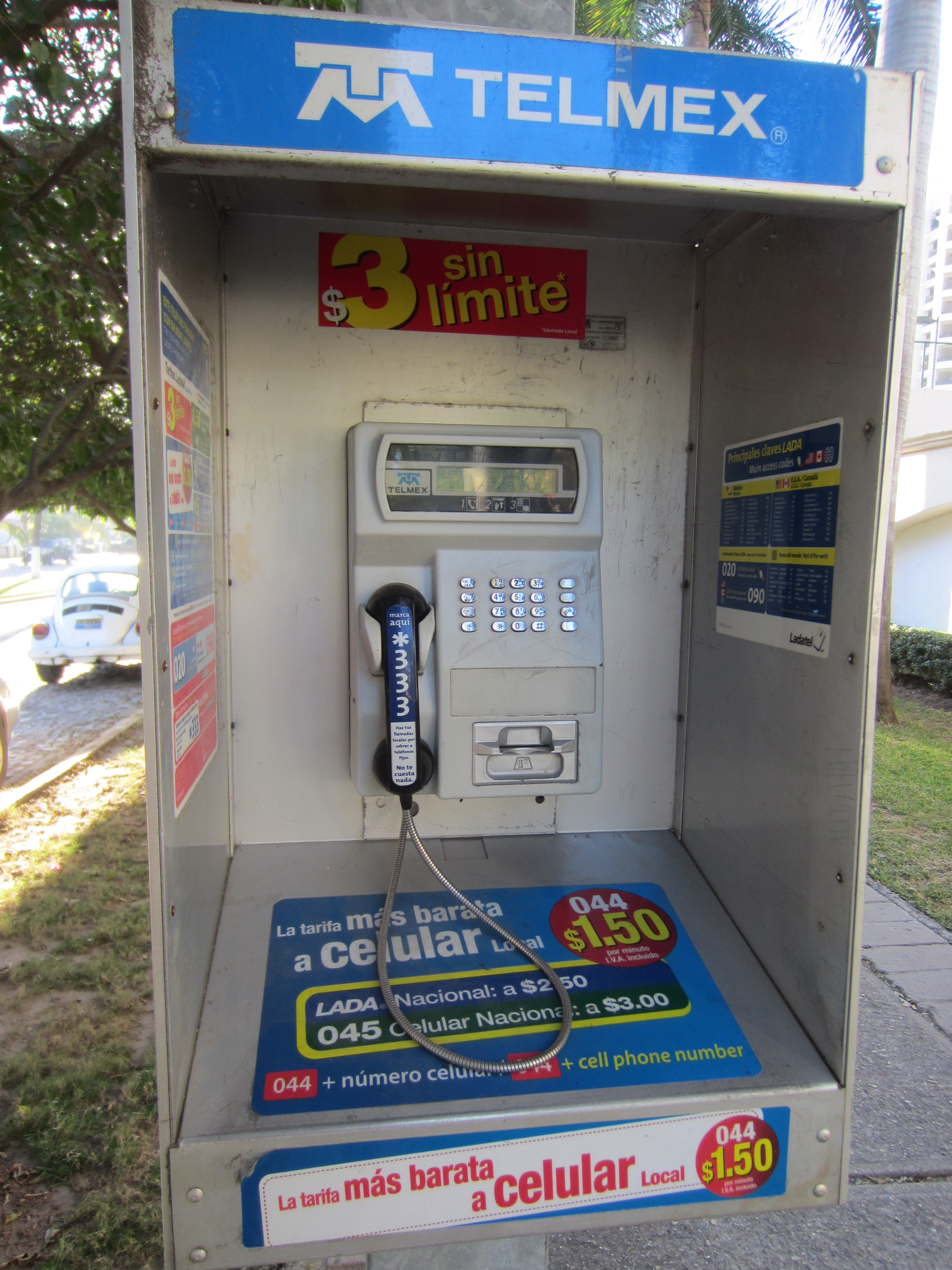
Telmex public telephone, which operates with smart cards prepaid.

In December 2006, Telmex announced agreement to acquire TV Cable and Cable Pacifico in Colombia. TV Cable offers cable television, Internet and Voice over IP services and has been in operation for 20 years. As of 2013, the company serves 164,000 homes in Bogotá and Cali. Cable Pacifico serves nine states and its main operation is in Medellín. As of 2013, Cable Pacifico has approximately 100,000 subscribers.

In January 2007, America Movil bought the Verizon operations in Puerto Rico, and days later Telmex and America Movil announced that their equally owned joint venture had agreed with Verizon Communications Inc. ("Verizon") to terminate the joint venture's agreement to acquire Verizon's indirect equity interests in Compañía Anónima Nacional Teléfonos de Venezuela (CANTV); subsequently, all of Verizon's holdings in CANTV were acquired in May 2007 by the Venezuelan government, reaching 86.2% of its total shares.

In January 2007, Telmex launched Prodigy Media, the first step to offer triple play services to the Mexican market. Days later, Telmex started the first Wi-Max network in Chile, offering local, long-distance and Internet services to 98% of the Chilean population.

In March 2007, Telmex bought Ecutel, a small telecommunications company in Ecuador that offers services to the corporate market.

In April 2007, Telmex announced agreement to acquire CABLECENTRO and SATELCARIBE in Colombia. CABLECENTRO offers cable TV and Internet access services and has been in operation for 7 years. Currently, the company operates in more than 50 cities in Colombia including Bogota, Cucuta, Bucaramanga, Ibague and Neiva, among others. SATELCARIBE offers cable TV and Internet access services and has been in operation for 7 years. Currently, the company operates in more than 15 cities in Colombia.

In December 2007, Telmex transferred its Latin American and yellow pages directory businesses to a new, separate entity, Telmex Internacional.

== América Móvil takeover ==
In January 2010, América Móvil, the largest mobile phone company in Latin America, made an offer to buy Telmex and Telmex International in order to better compete against Spain's Telefonica and Malaysia's Telekom Malaysia. The acquisition was approved by the CFC (Comisión Federal de Competencia) Antitrust Office in Mexico on February 11, 2010.

América Móvil was once the mobile arm of Telmex, but in 2001, América Móvil was split off and grew larger than the former parent company.

== See also ==
- List of telephone operating companies
- List of telecommunications regulatory bodies
