= British Telecommunications plc v. Prodigy =

British Telecommunications plc v. Prodigy Communications Corp.
- Court: United States District Court for the Southern District of New York
- Full case name: British Telecommunications plc v. Prodigy Communications Corporation
- Argued: December 13, 2000
- Decided: August 22, 2002
- Docket nos.: 7:00-cv-09451
- Citations: 189 F. Supp. 2d 101, 62 U.S.P.Q.2d 1879; 217 F. Supp. 2d 399 (2002).

Court membership
- Judge sitting: Colleen McMahon

British Telecommunications plc v. Prodigy Communications Corp. was a patent infringement case which determined whether a patent related to communications between central computers and their clients was infringed by Internet service providers through hyperlinks. Judge Colleen McMahon of the United States District Court for the Southern District of New York ruled that Prodigy Communications Corporation had not infringed the patent held by British Telecommunications plc through its use of hyperlinks. On summary judgment, McMahon held that there were substantial differences between British Telecommunications' patent and the method of operation of the Internet. The decision limited patent protection for Internet service providers' use of hyperlinks, protecting the providers from licensing fees related to this integral part of Internet technology.

== Background ==
British Telecommunications plc (BT) developed technology related to computer networking. BT was granted the "Sargent Patent (U.S. Patent No. 4,873,662)" by the United States Patent and Trademark Office on October 10, 1989. The patent application had been filed 12 years prior, in July 1977, and underwent many changes during the ensuing years. The patent described a system in which multiple users, each located at a remote terminal, could access data stored at a central computer. A user at a remote terminal would be able to access information stored in a central computer via telephone network. Information would be stored and transmitted in the form of blocks, with each block divided into two parts: a first portion including information to be displayed, and a second portion, not intended for display, which contained the complete addresses of other blocks of information linked to the current display page.

In June 2000, BT sent letters to Prodigy Communications Corporation ("Prodigy") and 16 other Internet service providers (ISPs), asking them to pay licensing fee for BT's hyperlink patent; all refused. BT sued Prodigy, the oldest ISP in the U.S., for patent infringement on December 13, 2000. In suing, BT claimed that the Sargent patent covered hyperlink technology, one of the building blocks of the World Wide Web. BT argued that not only had Prodigy directly infringed the Sargent patent, but that it was also liable for inducing its users to infringe BT's patent. Prodigy submitted a motion for summary judgment of non-infringement, arguing that the technology it used to provide Internet access to its consumers was not covered by the claims of the Sargent patent.

== Court analysis ==
To resolve this case, the US District court conducted through analysis on terms specified in claims of the Sargent patent and analyzed if the patent covered the hyperlink technology. The court decided that there were no disputed issues of material fact in this case, since the Sargent patent was by no means the same as internet and Web-based technology, and, therefore, granted Prodigy's request for summary judgement. British Telecom lost this case. In determining whether Prodigy had indeed infringed BT's Sargent patent, the court separated the patent trials into two phases: a Markman hearing constituted the first phase, with infringement analysis following. After issuing an opinion and order following the Markman hearing on March 13, 2002, the court conducted the infringement analysis to determine whether the claims of the patent, as interpreted by the Markman analysis, infringed upon the Sargent patent.

=== Markman hearing: patent claim analysis ===
A Markman hearing is a process in which the court translates the complicated words of a patent claim into plain English in order to clarify the facts upon which infringement and invalidity analysis hinge. Since BT had reduced the number of asserted claims in the Sargent patent from seven to five on June 22, 2001, and then from five to four on January 18, 2002, the court conducted the Markman hearing based only on claims 3, 5, 6 and 7 of the Sargent patent. The court ruled that central computer means a central computer fixed in one location in which every available piece of information accessible to users at a remote terminal is stored. Additionally, the meaning of the term blocks of information was clarified. The court ruled that each block was required to contain a first portion and a second portion which are stored together, stored next to one another in memory, and can be separated from one another. The first portion includes information component that is intended for display, while the second portion contains the complete address for each of the other blocks of information referenced in the first portion and other information to influence the display or reduce the complexity of communication. Lastly, the court concluded that a complete address in the Sargent patent is a physical (i.e.: in memory), non-virtual address from which requested blocks of information are called without reference to other information.

=== Patent infringement analysis ===
==== Does the Internet have a central computer? ====
The court held that Prodigy had not infringed the Sargent patent, because the Internet has no "central computer". The Sargent patent required that all information requested by users be stored in a single hub called the central computer and sent from the central computer to a remote terminal. However, the Internet is a networked system in which different computers are linked together so that one terminal can locate desired information from any of the other computers it is connected to. According to the court, the Internet functions in a manner which is antithetical to that of a digital information storage system having a central computer, as described by the Sargent patent.

==== Does the Internet implement hyperlinks using separate "blocks"? ====
The Sargent patent describes the target addresses of other pages as being stored in a second sub-block attached to the content for display. The court found no evidence that the Internet functions like this. For example, it analysed the following example of HTML code:

<A href="http://www.msnbc.com/modules/exports/ct_prodigy.asp?/news/736921.asp" target="_top">Yahoo! profits meet forecasts</A>

According to the Court, since the URL of the link is adjacent to the corresponding phase for display, the URL is not separable from the main document and is therefore not stored in the manner described by the patent.

==== Does Prodigy's Web service include "complete addresses?" ====
Once more, the court judged in favor of Prodigy, saying that Prodigy internet service did not include the complete address of a piece of information, as required by the Sargent patent. The Uniform Resource Locator ("URL") standard that uniquely names the location of resources requires additional information, in the form of a TCP/IP protocol, in order to access a web page from a web server. More specifically, when a user requests information, the web browser the user is using first obtains the IP address of the server where the corresponding information resides and then accesses the external Domain Name System (DNS) server to get the desired information. Thus, the way internet finds the location of requested information is not complete as specified in the Sargent patent.

== Holdings ==
The court held that the Sargent patent did not protect the hyperlink technology used by Prodigy and other ISPs. Additionally, since Prodigy had not directly infringed BT's patent, Prodigy could not be held liable for contributory infringement and active inducement of infringement. The court held that there were no disputed issues of material facts, since the Sargent patent was dissimilar to the Web technology used by ISPs including Prodigy. Thus, the court granted Prodigy's motion for summary judgement to dismiss the patent infringement claims.
