= A1 Telekom Austria =

Austrian telecommunications company

A1 Telekom Austria AG
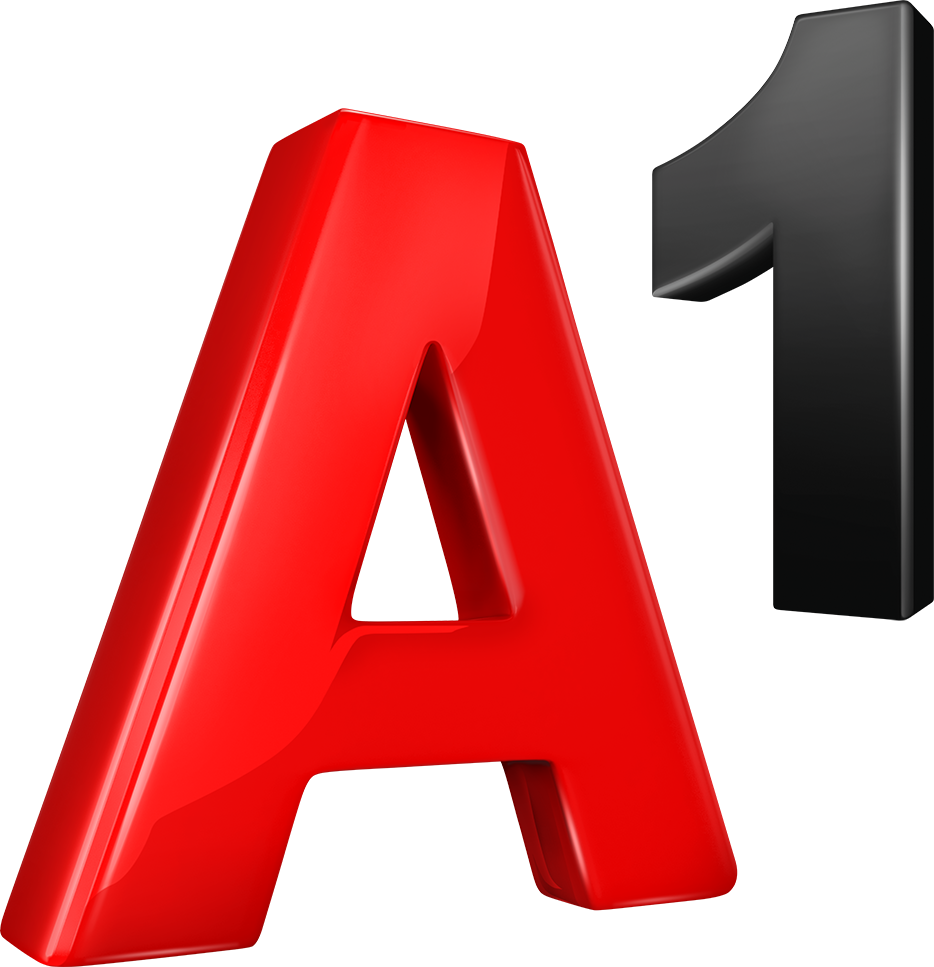
- Formerly: mobilkom austria (1996–2010)
- Company type: Subsidiary (Aktiengesellschaft)
- Industry: Telecommunications
- Founded: 1996; 30 years ago
- Headquarters: Vienna, Austria
- Area served: Austria
- Key people: Jiří Dvorjančanský (CEO); Sonja Wallner (CFO)
- Products: Fixed line and mobile telephony, internet, IT services, IPTV
- Brands: A1, bob, Yesss!, Red Bull Mobile
- Revenue: ▲€2.677 billion (2021)
- Operating income: ▲€441,3 (2021)
- Net income: ▲€299,6 (2021)
- Number of employees: 7,180 (2021)
- Parent: A1 Telekom Austria Group
- Website: www.a1.net

A1 Telekom Austria (A^{1}, A eins) is the leading fixed and mobile network operator in Austria, with 5.4 million mobile and 2.3 million fixed-line customers. A1 Telekom Austria traces its origins to Austria's first GSM mobile phone network which began testing in 1992 and commercial operations in 1994, under the name Mobilkom Austria, then part of the Austrian state-owned PTT agency Post- und Telegraphenverwaltung (PTV, ÖPT) until it was split off into its own company in 1996. After Mobilkom's merger with A1 Telekom Austria Group in July 2010 it operates under the new name of A1 Telekom Austria.

A1 Telekom Austria is a 100% subsidiary of A1 Telekom Austria Group. A1 Telekom Austria offers fixed–mobile convergence. The product portfolio includes Fixed line and mobile telephony, internet, IT services, IPTV, wholesale services as well as mobile payment services. It offers products under the brands A^{1} (complete services offer), Bob and Yesss! (No frills-mobile telephony flanker brands) as well as Red Bull MOBILE (co-operation with Red Bull).

A1 Telekom Austria Group currently has over 24 million users in 8 countries. It created more than 4 billion EUR and has over 17.500 employees. The group is the European unit of the company América Móvil, the 3rd biggest provider of wireless services in the world.

A1 Telekom Austria Group also operates in the following markets: Belarus, Bulgaria, Croatia, North Macedonia, Serbia and Slovenia.

== History ==
The company launched GPRS in 2000. Three years later A1 introduced 3G UMTS which was upgraded first to HSDPA in 2007 and afterwards to HSPA+ in March 2009; followed by 4G LTE in September 2010, DC-HSPA+ in December 2010, LTE-A in 2014, LTE-A Pro in December 2018 and 5G NR in January 2020. In October 2013 A1 Telekom Austria AG acquired 2 x 70 MHz in mobile frequencies in the Austrian multiband auction. The total expenses amounted to EUR 1.03 billion.

As a consequence of the acquisition of Orange Austria by Hutchison Drei, A1 acquired the discount flanker brand Yesss! from Orange for €390 million.

In December 2021, A1 had a market share of 49.2% in broadband and 38.6% in voice mobile. The company had around 5 million mobile and 3 million fixed line subscribers at year end 2021.

A1 Austria debuted its newly refreshed logo on 24 May 2018 after Telekom Austria's Bulgarian subsidiary was rebranded A1 Bulgaria.

== Sponsorship ==
A1 was the title sponsor of the A1-Ring racetrack from 1996 to 2003 and is a team sponsor of the Austrian Ski Association (ÖSV) since 1997.

== See also ==
- List of mobile network operators in Europe
