= Claro (telecommunications company) =

Mexican wireless operator

- Type: Subsidiary
- Industry: Wireless services
- Founded: 19 September 2003; 23 years ago São Paulo, Brazil
- Headquarters: Mexico City, Mexico (via América Móvil)
- Number of locations: List: Argentina; Brazil; Chile; Colombia; Costa Rica; Dominican Republic; Ecuador; El Salvador; Guatemala; Honduras; Jamaica; Mexico (Claro brand used by Telcel); Nicaragua; Panama; Paraguay; Peru; Puerto Rico; Uruguay
- Key people: Manola Ayala (CEO); Carlos J. García Moreno (CFO); Carlos Cárdenas (Executive Latin America Operations)
- Services: UMTS/HSDPA, CDMA, GSM, AMPS, Wireless Data Services, Push to Talk
- Revenue: 2018 R$49.2B BR; $9.1B USD
- Number of employees: +100,000
- Parent: América Móvil
- Subsidiaries: Cablenet S.A.; Claro TV; Embratel; Movistar Guatemala; Star One; Telecomoda
- Website: www.claro.com

Map of countries where the Claro brand operates as of 2025

Claro S.A., known simply as Claro, is a Brazilian-founded Latin American telecommunications company, part of América Móvil, a Mexican telecom group. Claro serves customers in Argentina, Brazil, Chile, Colombia, Costa Rica, the Dominican Republic, Ecuador, El Salvador, Guatemala, Honduras, Nicaragua, Panama, Paraguay, Peru, Puerto Rico and Uruguay. Its Mexican operations are branded as Claro Mexico. The company's name means "bright," "clear," and also "of course," in both Portuguese and Spanish.

== Markets ==
=== Central America & the Caribbean ===
==== Costa Rica ====
After the opening of telecommunications in Costa Rica when the monopoly of the ICE Group was dissolved, the government opened a tender for telecommunications companies wishing to enter Costa Rica. Superintendencia de Tele-Comunicaciones (SUTEL) of Costa Rica secured a license, and the company began offering lines on November 5, 2011 to users who had registered on their website or through social networks. Service began on November 11.

==== Dominican Republic ====
Claro was launched in the Dominican Republic on January 31, 2007 after its acquisition of Verizon Dominicana on April 3, 2006. Its Dominican Republic slogans have included "Claro que tienes más" ("Of Course you have more"), "La Red donde todo es posible" ("The network where everything is possible"), and recently, "Estamos para ti" ("We are for you").

==== El Salvador, Honduras and Nicaragua ====
Claro was introduced in El Salvador, Honduras and Nicaragua in September 2006.

In 2008, Claro introduced its satellite TV in El Salvador, also in Guatemala.

Claro (formerly CTE Telecom) is a mobile and fixed phone, broadband and television service provider in El Salvador. Formerly controlled by parent company CTE Telecom in El Salvador (owned by América Móvil of Mexico), the company started its wireless service as "Personal" around 1999, and later added "ALÓ" with the motto "Facil y Rapido" (Spanish for "Easy and Fast"). In 2009, America Movil unified the brand in Latin America under the name Claro.

On January 24, 2019, América Móvil announce that the company will acquire Movistar's operations in El Salvador. However, the proposed acquisition was scrapped due to strict requirements to approve the acquisition.

==== Guatemala ====
On November 16, 1996, the Guatemalan Congress passed the "Ley General de Telecomunicaciones" (General Telecommunications Law) that stipulated the privatization of Guatel, the former, state-owned, telecommunications company. It was purchased by LUCA S.A. and Ricardo Bueso became Telgua's first President and CEO until 2000. In 2000, it joined América Móvil and some time after it renamed the brands ALO and PCS Digital to Claro on Guatemala.

Claro was introduced in Guatemala on September 7, 2006 as a rebranding of Telgua-owned PCS Digital and Alo de PCS. As of March 31, 2007, Claro in Guatemala had more than 5.2 million subscribers, with CDMA/1XRTT, GSM/GPRS/EDGE and UMTS/HSDPA (some cities with HSPA) wireless technology.

On January 24, 2019, América Móvil acquired Movistar's operations in Guatemala, in addition to acquiring the Movistar's operations in El Salvador. Eventually, Movistar's and Tuenti's network in Guatemala would become integrated and merged with Claro in Guatemala.

==== Jamaica ====
Claro was introduced in Jamaica as a replacement for the MiPhone company. Oceanic Digital Jamaica Limited (ODJ) was a wholly owned subsidiary of América Móvil, providing service under the Claro name. The company built a GSM/UMTS/HSDPA network with the CDMA network, and plans included fixed wireless and broadband service on the CDMA network (competing with Digicel and LIME). The Jamaican company was acquired by Digicel in late 2011, and the network was closed (with permission from the outgoing Jamaica Labour Party government) in March 2012.

==== Panama ====
Claro was introduced in Panama in 2008, As of 2022 the company went through a merger with +Movil Panama (Cable and Wireless Panama.)

==== Puerto Rico ====
Claro was introduced in Puerto Rico on May 18, 2007 as a replacement for Verizon Wireless. It is the wireless arm of Puerto Rico Telephone, which offers landline telephone and data services, while Coqui.Net (bought by Puerto Rico Telephone) manages Claro's ISP and IPTV services on the island. One problem with the transition has been the non-portability of telephones to the contiguous United States (Puerto Rico is part of the United States), resulting in a preference for Liberty Puerto Rico (formerly AT&T).

=== South America ===
==== Argentina, Paraguay and Uruguay ====
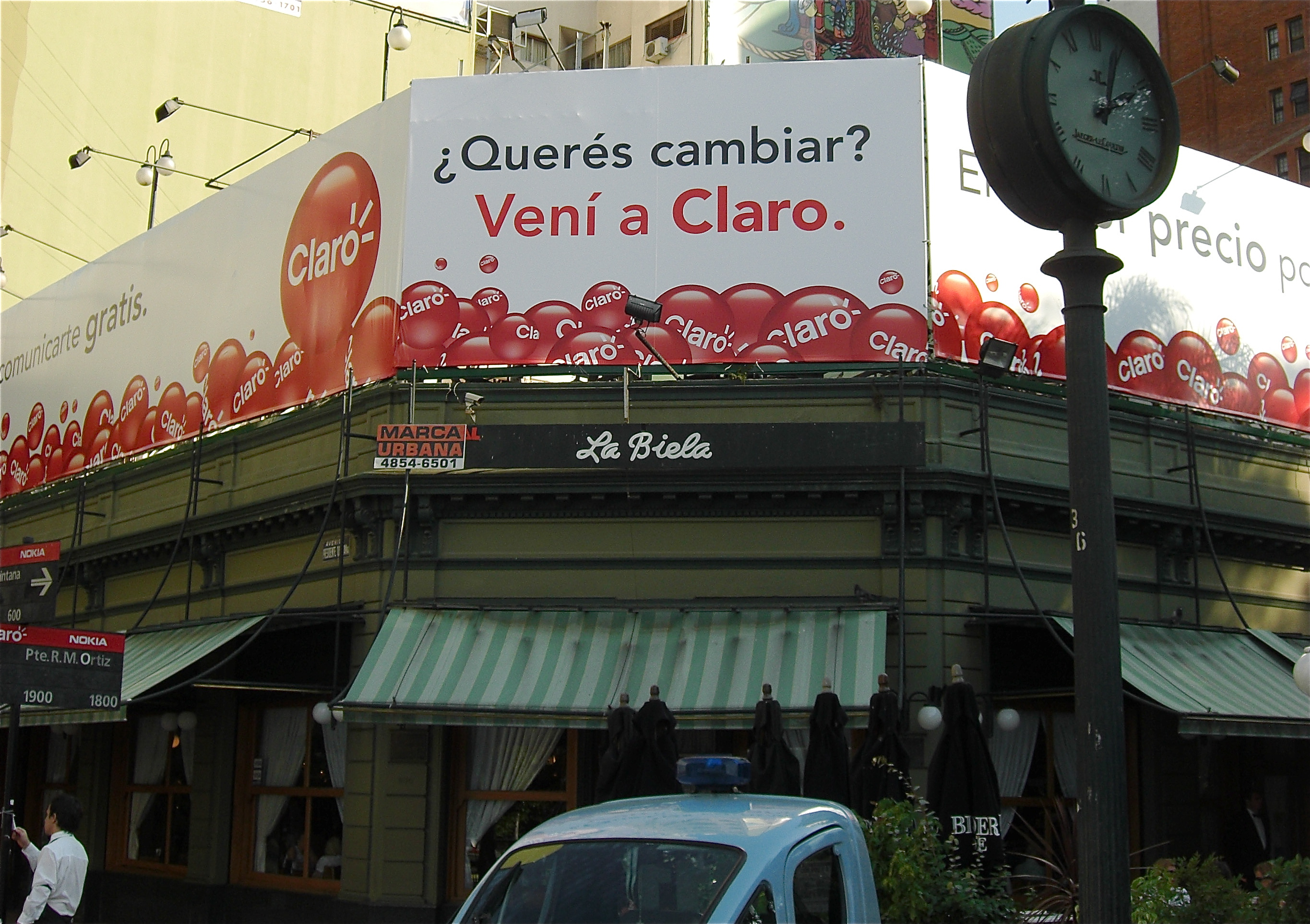
Claro billboard in the Recoleta district of Buenos Aires, Argentina

Headquartered in Córdoba, Argentina, Claro was launched in Argentina, Paraguay and Uruguay on March 25, 2008 in a rebranding of CTI Móvil. As of 31 March 2007 the former served more than 12.8 million subscribers on CDMA/1XRTT and GSM/GPRS/EDGE wireless.

CTI Móvil purchased Hutchison Telecom operation in Paraguay (which operated as "PortHable") in July 2005 to begin serving customers in that country. As of 2006, Claro competed with international operators such as Tigo (Millicom), Personal (Telecom Argentina-Telecom Italia) and VOX (formerly KDDI. VOX was acquired in 2011 by the state landline company, COPACO). In these countries, the company used slogans such as "Es simple. Es Claro." ("It's simple. It's clear") and "Claro es Internet móvil de alta velocidad." ("Claro is high-speed mobile Internet.")

==== Brazil ====
In Brazil, Claro was launched in 2003 with the merger of América Móvil-owned operators ATL (serving the states of Rio de Janeiro and Espírito Santo), BCP (with service in São Paulo metropolitan area, Pernambuco, Alagoas, Ceará, Paraíba, Piauí and Rio Grande do Norte), Americel (operating in Acre, Tocantins, Rondônia, the Distrito Federal, Goiás, Mato Grosso, Mato Grosso do Sul), Tess Celular (other areas of São Paulo state) and Claro Digital (serving Rio Grande do Sul).

Claro later expanded its service to the states of Bahia, Sergipe, Santa Catarina, Paraná and Minas Gerais. As of 2012, the provider has over 260 million active mobile telephony connections and a mobile penetration of over 130%. With competitor Vivo, Claro was one of two operators to introduce the iPhone 3G in Brazil, with TIM participating later. Claro Brazil also runs a pay-tv service, Claro TV. Slogans used by the Brazilian branch include "Nós escutamos" ("We listen") and "Escolha" ("Choose"). Artur Carvalho Caravante - CEO

==== Chile ====
Claro Chile was originally known as Chilesat PCS, which later renamed to Smartcom PCS. Claro was launched in Chile on August 6, 2006, after its acquisition of Smartcom PCS. Slogans such as "Yo soy Claro, y me gusta." ("I am Claro, and I like it.") have appeared in advertisements.

In the mobile operator segment, Claro is third in market share behind Movistar and Entel.

==== Colombia ====
While Claro has developed a large market share in Colombia, data for prepaid customers indicates that Claro has lost market share to competing providers Tigo and Movistar; this may be due to Claro's position as the most-expensive per-minute provider in the country's prepaid market. Tigo and Movistar offer prepaid customers flat-rate per-minute plans for calls placed to all mobile service providers and landlines within Colombia (229 and 199 pesos per minute, respectively). The cheapest per-minute rate for Claro prepaid customers is 249 pesos per minute, a rate valid for only nine "preferred Claro numbers". Per-minute rates increase for calls to Claro numbers not on a customer's "preferred" list and all calls to other cellphone providers or landline numbers.

==== Ecuador ====
Claro Ecuador is owned by America Móvil Latin America. Alfredo Escobar San Lucas is the CEO, Marco Antonio Campos Garcia is the CFO.

Claro Ecuador is based in Ecuador and provides M2M services on HSPA+, HSDPA, UMTS, EDGE, GPRS, GSM technologies. Claro brand is operated by America Móvil. Claro's M2M services is powered by Jasper Wireless.

In Ecuador, América Móvil was present with Conecel (commercially known as Porta) until February 2011. The name "Porta" was switched to "Claro" as part of América Móvil's business strategy. It is the country's leading operator, with nearly nine million subscribers.

Claro, Ecuador’s leading MNO by subscribers, has planned to invest around US$500 million over the next three years in order to expand 4G network coverage and acquire new spectrum being sold later this year. Ecuador has planned to auction spectrum in the 700 MHz and 2.5 GHz bands in November while an auction of frequencies in the 3.5 GHz band is scheduled for August 2020. In addition to enhancing its 4G network footprint, the telco is also planning to begin 5G trials in Quito and Guayaquil.

==== Peru ====
Claro began operation on October 11, 2005 after its acquisition of TIM Peru. The country has more than seventeen million customers.

== Other company activity ==
In 2012 Claro Americas was a partner in the (RED) Campaign with Adidas, American Express, Converse, China UnionPay, Legea and Servientrega. The campaign's mission is to prevent the transmission of the HIV virus from mother to child by 2015, with a slogan "Fighting For An AIDS Free Generation".

Claro has sponsored the Sauber F1 Team from 2011 to 2014, 2018 to 2019, and in 2025.

== See also ==
- Claro TV
- List of mobile network operators of the Americas
- List of telecommunications regulatory bodies
