= Agency.com =

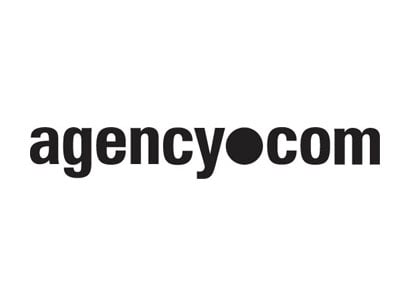
- Industry: Advertising
- Founded: 1995
- Founder: Chan Suh, Kyle Shannon
- Defunct: 2010
- Successor: The Designory
- Area served: Worldwide

Agency.com was an interactive marketing agency based in New York City with offices worldwide. The company was a part of Omnicom Group Inc. and had approximately 500 employees in eleven offices on three continents. Services included website design and development, interactive marketing, search marketing and rich media development.

== Timeline ==
Starting in 1994, Gabrielle Shannon began publishing Urban Desires, one of the first and most popular early webzines, in collaboration with Chan Suh and Kyle Shannon. The webzine was a production of Agency.com but motivated by pleasure rather than profit.

On February 10, 1995, Agency.com was incorporated by Suh and (Kyle) Shannon to provide website development and interactive marketing services. Omnicom Group Inc. purchased a significant minority investment in 1996, providing capitalization for growth into the rapidly expanding market for interactive services. Online Magic, a UK-based interactive marketing firm established by ad agency DDB Worldwide, was acquired in 1998 to provide Agency.com with its first international location.

In 1998, the company merged with Eagle River Interactive to form what was, at the time, the largest interactive marketing agency in the world. Other acquisitions in 1998 included Spiral Media in New York and Interactive Solutions in Boston. In 1999 the company acquired iTraffic to bolster its online marketing services offering. Digital Vision Communications was acquired in 1999 in order to give the company a full service presence in the Chicago market. Also in 1999, an office in Amsterdam, the Netherlands was open by acquiring Twinspark Interactive People BV.

In December of that year, the company went public, and was listed on the NASDAQ stock exchange as ACOM. Initiated in 2001 and completed in 2003, the company was taken private by an investment firm. It was later sold to Omnicom.

In 2004, iTraffic was absorbed into the Agency.com operating structure. That same year, the company also acquired Exile on Seventh and absorbed its Internet marketing operations into its San Francisco office.

In 2006, Agency.com expanded operations in Europe with the rebranding of Hypervision in Belgium and TEQUILA\Digital in Italy.

In 2008, co-founder Chan Suh returned to the position of CEO at the fledgling agency. However, in late 2009 co-founder Chan Suh and EVP Ken Trush resigned from their positions with the company as a result of an impending merger with fellow Omnicom agency TBWA\Chiat\Day.

In 2010, Omnicom announced the dismantling of Agency.com in the United States, but the brand remained in Europe.

In 2011 most of the remaining Agency.com converged in The Designory. In Italy the agency was partly absorbed by TBWA\ and partly bought out by the management, and then merged in Draftfcb; in Belgium the brand remained under the umbrella of TBWA\.

== Controversy ==
A 2006 ad campaign by Agency.com involved an experimental "viral" pitch video for the Subway (restaurant) account uploaded onto YouTube.com. The purpose of the pitch video upload appears to have been an attempt to show Agency.com's online innovation to Subway by including a "viral" component in the pitch by documenting the pitch process itself and uploading it for all the world to see, discuss, and pass around. The term, "When we roll, we roll big" was used by an Agency.com employee in the video. Industry commentary was generally negative.

== See also ==
- OutRank by Rogers
- Zeta Interactive
