= Mobile office =

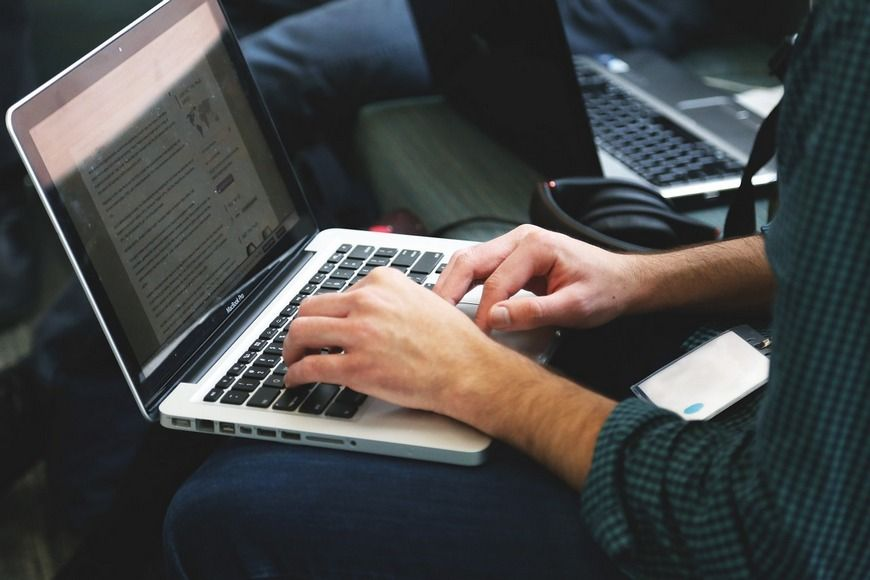
Working with portable equipment

A mobile office is an office built within a truck, motorhome, trailer, or intermodal container. The term may also refer to work conducted without a fixed physical office, where office equipment is carried by the worker. Mobile offices are used in various contexts, including emergency services as mobile command centers and in healthcare as mobile clinics providing on-site services. Many mobile offices are constructed from standard shipping containers which have been modified to have additional doors and windows, insulation, heating, cooling, electrical outlets and lighting, and plumbing.

== See also ==
- Mobile home
- Virtual office
