= Telecommunications industry =

Telephone companies and Internet service providers

The telecommunications industry within the sector of information and communication technology comprises all telecommunication/telephone companies and Internet service providers, and plays a crucial role in the evolution of mobile communications and the information society.

Telephone calls continue to be the industry's largest revenue generator, but due to advances in network technology, telecom today is less about voice and increasingly about text (messaging, email) and images (e.g. video streaming). High-speed Internet access for computer-based data applications such as broadband information services and interactive entertainment is pervasive. Digital subscriber line (DSL) is the main broadband telecom technology. The fastest growth comes from (value-added) services delivered over mobile networks.

The telecom sector continues to be at the epicenter for growth, innovation, and disruption for virtually any industry. Mobile devices and related broadband connectivity continue to be more and more embedded in the fabric of society today and they are key in driving the momentum around some key trends such as video streaming, Internet of Things (IoT), and mobile payments.

— Deloitte

Think of telecommunications as the world's biggest machine. Strung together by complex networks, telephones, mobile phones and internet-linked PCs, the global system touches nearly all of us. It allows us to speak, share thoughts and do business with nearly anyone, regardless of where in the world they might be. Telecom operating companies make all this happen.

— Investopedia

Insight Research projected that telecommunications services revenue worldwide would grow from $2.2 trillion in 2015 to $2.4 trillion in 2019.

== Market segmentation ==
Of all the customer markets, residential and small business markets are the toughest. With hundreds of players in the market, competitors rely heavily on price; success rests largely on brand name strength and investment in efficient billing systems. The corporate market remains the industry's favorite. Big corporate customers are concerned mostly about the quality and reliability of their telephone calls and data delivery while being less price-sensitive than residential customers. Multinationals, spend heavily on telecom infrastructure and premium services like high-security private networks and videoconferencing. Network connectivity can also be provided to other telecom companies by wholesaling circuits to heavy network users like internet service providers and large corporations.

=== Value chain ===
2018 share of revenues by segment
segment	% share of revenues
Infrastructure and platform vendors	5
Device vendors	20
Operators	55
Over-the-top content (OTT), content, advertising services	10
Retail and distribution	10

== Global players ==
Top global telecom companies in 2013
Company	Country	Market value ($ Bn)	Revenue	Profit
China Mobile	China	213.8	88.8	20.5
AT&T	USA	200.1	127.3	7.3
Verizon Communications	USA	137.3	115.7	0.9
Vodafone	UK	135.7	74.4	11.1
América Móvil	Mexico	70.7	60.2	7.1
Telefónica	Spain	67.1	82.3	5.2
Telstra	Australia	58.4	25.8	3.5
Nippon Telegraph & Tel	Japan	58.2	127	5.6
Deutsche Telekom	Germany	48.8	76.7	-7
Softbank	Japan	47.2	38.78	3.8

== Mergers and acquisitions ==
Around 24,800 M&A deals have been conducted in the telecommunication industry with either the acquirer or the target company coming from the telecommunications sector. In total over 5.712 bil. USD have been spent on M&A between 1985 and 2018 in this industry. There has only been one big M&A wave around 1999 and 2000. In most other industry there are three waves between 1990 and 2018. Since 1999 deal value shrunk by -90.12% and is expected to stagnate in 2018.

Here is a list of the top ten telecommunication deals in history ranked by volume:

Date Announced	Acquiror Name	Acquiror Mid Industry	Acquiror Nation	Target Name	Target Mid Industry	Target Nation	Value of Transaction ($mil)
11/14/1999	Vodafone AirTouch PLC	Wireless	United Kingdom	Mannesmann AG	Wireless	Germany	202,785.13
09/02/2013	Verizon Communications Inc	Telecommunications Services	United States	Verizon Wireless Inc	Wireless	United States	130,298.32
03/05/2006	AT&T Inc	Wireless	United States	BellSouth Corp	Telecommunications Services	United States	72,671.00
05/11/1998	SBC Communications Inc	Telecommunications Services	United States	Ameritech Corp	Telecommunications Services	United States	62,592.54
01/15/1999	Vodafone Group PLC	Wireless	United Kingdom	AirTouch Communications Inc	Telecommunications Services	United States	60,286.87
01/26/2000	Shareholders	Other Financials	Canada	Nortel Networks Corp	Telecommunications Equipment	Canada	59,973.57
06/14/1999	Qwest Commun Intl Inc	Telecommunications Services	United States	US WEST Inc	Other Telecom	United States	56,307.03
06/24/1998	AT&T Corp	Telecommunications Services	United States	Tele-Communications Inc	Cable	United States	53,592.49
07/28/1998	Bell Atlantic Corp	Telecommunications Services	United States	GTE Corp	Telecommunications Services	United States	53,414.58
04/22/1999	AT&T Corp	Telecommunications Services	United States	MediaOne Group Inc	Cable	United States	49,278.87

== Recent developments ==
The telecommunications sector has seen a large increase in the recent years. Whereas in 2015 there were 3.3 billion active mobile broadband subscriptions worldwide, in 2020 there were around 7.7 billion. This increase was due, in part at least, to the deployment of 4G LTE.

During the COVID-19 pandemic, telecommunications was used to track the spread of COVID-19 and was use by remote workers to conduct business during the COVID-19 lockdowns.

== Societies ==
- Telecommunications Industry Association
- IEEE Communications Society
- Category:Telecommunications organizations

== See also ==
- List of mobile network operators
- List of telephone operating companies
- Impact of the COVID-19 pandemic on science and technology#Telecommunications
- Category:Telecommunications companies
