= Internet in Brazil =

Internet in Brazil was launched in 1988, becoming commercially available in May 1995. As of October 2025, Brazil ranked fifth in the world with 185 million internet users. The country had an internet penetration rate of 86.6% as of January 2024. In December 2025, Brazil ranked 26th in the Ookla Broadband Ranking (fixed broadband), with a median speed of 222.06 Mbit/s. Also, as per December 2021, Brazil had 41,4 million fixed broadband accesses, most of them FTTH. However, as per 2020, most Brazilians access the Internet through a mobile connection, with more than 200 million mobile internet access (104 accesses/100 inhabitants).

== History ==
Late 1969, one of many offices funded by the United States Department of Defense Advanced Research Project Agency (ARPA) invested in a project that expanded the knowledge of network connectivity to many globally sponsored universities and research institutions, including Brazil.

In 1979, Brazilian universities collaborated their knowledge of computer networks and created the National Laboratory of Computer Networks(LARC) to trade information within local laboratories.

By 1984, LARC focused on providing network links to institutions in Rio de Janeiro by organizing the Rede-Rio Project.

For LARC to guarantee their institution network connections, they traveled to Berlin, Germany, in June 1985 to examine the academic network connections Germany had with its institutions and conclude that they sustained the OSI protocols, which led LARC also to make their network OSI compatible.

In 1987, representatives of the Pontifical Catholic University of Rio de Janeiro and the Polytechnic School of the University of São Paulo held meetings to advance academic network conventions.

In 1988 the National Research Network (RNP), was formed by the academic communities of Rio de Janeiro and São Paulo. Since its beginnings, including its introduction to the general public in 1995, the Brazilian Internet depended strongly on efforts led by the Federal Government through the Ministry of Communications, the state-owned communications company Embratel and its holding, Telebras.

This changed in 1998, as a result of the privatization of Telebras, and the blossoming of private companies, such as Telefônica, Telemar and Brasil Telecom. With the surge of competition for customers, coupled with government-imposed requirements, came improvements in cost, quality, and availability of the Internet to Brazilians.

ADSL was successful in Brazil during beta testing and became popular in the early 2000s, being offered by Telefónica (Speedy), Brasil Telecom (Turbo), NET (Virtua), and Telemar (Velox) with typical speeds of around 256 kbit/s down and 128 kbit/s up when introduced. Speeds in the early 2010s were between 15 and 1 Mbit/s down and up and 35 and 3 Mbit/s down and up, but speeds over 50 and 5 Mbit/s down and up and 100 and 20 Mbit/s down and up were becoming more common as prices fall and new ISPs such as Global Village Telecom (acquired by Spanish Telefónica in 2014) invested in VDSL2 and FTTH in the larger cities. Broadband access is split between ADSL, cable modem, satellite, VDSL, VDSL2, FTTH, and wireless Internet service providers (often called 'radio internet'), with the first WiFi services appearing in 2004.

During the first decade of the 21st century, limited availability of high-speed Internet in Brazil was a major problem, especially in rural regions. Accordingly, the Brazilian government pressured providers to broaden supply in outlying areas. Wireless LAN ISPs are becoming more common in the interior of the country. In large cities some WiFi hotspots are also available.

By November 2005, some cable companies were offering 2, 4, and 8 Mbit/s access for the same price as 512 kbit/s ADSL connections.

In April 2008 the Broadband in Schools program was launched to benefit 37 million students by bringing high speed Internet access to 64,879 urban public schools by the end of 2010.

In 2009 a lack of sufficient infrastructure for the Telefônica (Speedy) ISP led to periodic service failures in some areas. Sales were suspended by the Brazilian Agency of Telecommunications (ANATEL) until a process of major infrastructure expansion and rejuvenation was completed.

In 2010, broadband Internet access was available in 88% of Brazilian cities, surpassing all expectations for its expansion. By 2016, it was expected that the Internet will have 57% of penetration in Brazil; by 2017 this value has risen to 64,7%.

In 2016 and 2017, major internet providers announced their interest in introducing data caps, a decision that was met with major backlash; for the time being, the Brazilian Agency of Telecommunications has not allowed this and "does not plan to reopen the debate on fixed broadband caps".

In 2020, there were statistics that showed that 58% of the country population access the Internet solely through their smartphone, a number even higher in the lower income classes.

The internet in Brazil is dominated by three main internet service providers: Vivo, Claro, and TIM. As of the third quarter of 2024, Vivo maintains 36.63% of mobile broadband market shares, with Claro at 34.83% and TIM at 24.94%.

== Use ==
Brazil uses the .br top level domain, which is managed by the Brazilian Internet Steering Committee. In 2011 Brazil ranked fourth in the world with 23,456,00 Internet hosts. In April 2012 Brazil was 10th in the world with 48,572,160 IPv4 addresses allocated, 23.6 per 100 residents.

The Internet is a popular medium for citizen–government interaction. For example, as per 2009, 99% of all income tax forms were delivered online.

Some of the most popular websites are web portals, such as Globo.com, UOL and iG; search engines, including Google and Yahoo; and social network services, the most important of which, by far, is Facebook. Due to the popularity of virtual communications, Newsweek referred to Brazil as the "Schmooze Nation". In 2

== Internet service providers ==
- Vivo (a subsidiary of Spain's Telefónica, through the Telefônica Brasil) launched, in São Paulo, its FTTH service in 3Q 2007 with initial speeds of 30, 60, and 100 Mbit/s downstream, and 5 Mbit/s upstream. Also available is an IPTV on-demand service and a convergent POTS and mobile pack. In June 2007 Telefónica was reported to have fibre coverage of a potential 400,000 households with 20,000 signed up for service. From 2012 on, it adopted the brand "Vivo Fibra" for its FTTH broadband services. In 1Q2023 the company reported having 5.7 million homes connected with FTTH in the country. Vivo Fibra is available in 436 Brazilian cities and, since 2022, offers FTTH plans with speeds of up to 1 Gbit/s download (500 Mbit/s upload).
- Oi was the second ISP to offer FTTH, in January 2009. The service is now marketed in all Brazilian states. Oi is now offering its own FTTH operation, in its original service area and recently started in a few cities in the state of São Paulo. Oi claimed to have 4.0 million homes connected with FTTH in 1Q2023 offering FTTH plans with speeds of up to 1 Gbit/s download (500 Mbit/s upload).
- Claro (belonging to Mexican telecommunication corporation America Móvil) acquired Net Serviços de Comunicações, which provided Cable TV services in big and medium cities in Brazil. With a HFC network, they have been delivering speeds of up to 1 Gbit/s download (100 Mbit/s upload). Since 2019, new network installs are being done using fiber; as of 2022, however, the company does not plan to discontinue the existing HFC network, which has about 9 million users. In 1Q2023 Claro had about 1 million broadband customers served by FTTH, offering FTTH plans with speeds of up to 1 Gbit/s download (500 Mbit/s upload).
- TIM (a subsidiary of Italian company TIM Group) started offering FTTH broadband in 2012, initially only in some neighborhoods in the cities of São Paulo and Rio de Janeiro. Over the years the company's offer expanded and in 1Q2023 it served around 600 thousand customers in 10 states with speeds of up to 2 Gbit/s download (1 Gbit/s upload).
- Global Village Telecom (GVT) launched, in August 2009, FTTH service in 56 cities, including the major markets of Porto Alegre, Curitiba, Belo Horizonte, and Salvador. GVT offer speeds up to 100 Mbit/s downstream and 10 Mbit/s upstream. In October 2010 GVT reported a broadband subscriber base of one million users, around 60% of whom are hooked up to 10 Mbit/s or higher Internet connection. GVT was acquired by Telefónica in 2014.

Many small and regional ISPs offer FTTH service, either in new areas not previously covered or as a replacement for older Internet access technologies such as DSL and fixed wireless. Often these ISPs operate in areas not covered by larger providers. In 1Q2023, smaller ISPs accounted for 63.4% of the FTTH market in Brazil, serving around 20 million customers. Smaller operators like Unifique, Vero, and Desktop are gaining traction through acquisitions, particularly in underserved or rural areas where the big players may not be able to provide localized services. New entrants like Brisanet, Unifique, and Desktop have established strong footholds in less densely populated regions. Brazil also has a small MVNO (Mobile Virtual Network Operator) scene managed by Anatel. The largest MVNO provider is Datora which sits at around 2.7 thousand users.

Some ISPs have their equipment damaged or stolen by militias or gangs who then sell Internet services to locals, using force to prevent the original equipment owners from reclaiming or repairing infrastructure. These efforts have been described as an extension of previous criminal activities that took control of water and electricity infrastructure in poor neighborhoods.

== User base ==
Brazil has the fifth largest number of internet users in the world, behind China, India, The United States, and Indonesia. As of January 2023, Brazil had a total of 177 million internet users, which is about a 1.05% increase from 2022. The proportion of users accessing the Internet via mobile phones, desktop computers, tablets, and consoles were 55.46%, 43.81%, 0.60%, and 0.13%, respectively. 86% of women had access to the internet while 83% of males had access.

As of 2023, 85% of Brazilians living in urban areas had internet access while 78% of people living in rural areas had access. The percentage of people in urban areas with access has been steadily increasing by a few percentage points each year. The level of people in rural areas with access was steadily increasing throughout the 2010s then saw a significant jump of 53% to 70% from 2019 to 2020, which is roughly a 24% increase.

== Democratization of high-speed internet and legal challenge ==
In the early 2000s, Brazilian telecommunications company Telefônica mandated that customers using its "Speedy" broadband service also contract a separate, another paid internet service provider (ISP), a practice that critics described as an abusive "tied selling" requirement. Telefônica, on the other hand, argued the practice was based on an interpretation of federal telecommunications regulations.

In May 2002, legal scholar Renato Baccaro secured an injunction that prohibited Telefônica from suspending internet service for refusing to use a separate paid ISP. This legal victory was an influential in public policies, while challenging the company. Baccaro later documented the legal arguments and significance of these consumer rulings in his 2003 paper, Da Desnecessidade de contratar o segundo provedor de acesso à Internet e as liminares favoráveis ao consumidor (On the unnecessary need to contract a second internet access provider and the injunctions favorable to the consumer), published in 2003 by Thomson Reuters, Revista de Direito do Consumidor.

Following this injunction, a federal prosecutor used Baccaro's case as the basis for a broader public civil action. The federal prosecutor argued that the benefit of the injunction should be extended to the entire country to protect all internet users, a legal measure that ensured that the federal agency Anatel changed public policy on internet democratization in Brazil.

Based on Baccaro's case and the public civil action, Brazil's leading consumer rights organization, IDEC, also challenged Telefônica and other major providers like Brasil Telecom and Oi over the same issue. These collective legal actions led to rulings that strengthened consumer protection rights and ended forced "tied selling" practices by major telecommunications companies. The outcome expanded consumer choice by allowing internet users to select their preferred broadband provider independently, fostering competition and democratization of high-speed internet in Brazil.

== Regulations ==
By 2009, Brazil's government unfolded some restrictions to provide a civil, secure, and free internet by developing the Brazilian Digital Bill of Rights (Marco Civil da Internet).

When Brazil started transitioning from a national research network to a commercial internet, the Brazilian executive branch and Congress applied regulations to control the internet.

Officially the Brazilian Civil Rights Framework for the Internet (in Portuguese: Marco Civil da Internet, officially Law No 12.965) became law on April 23, 2014, at the Global Multistakeholder Meeting on the Future of Internet Governance. It governs the use of the Internet in Brazil, through forecasting principles, guarantees, rights and duties to those who use the network as well as the determination of guidelines for state action.

In Brazil, network neutrality is regulated by Marco Civil Law, otherwise known as Law #12,965. It was signed into law in 2014 and initiated in 2015. This framework establishes the rights, obligations, guarantees and principles for internet usage in Brazil.

In 2020, Brazil passed the LGPD or “Lei Geral de Proteção de Dados Pessoais”, the country's first law to provide a complete framework to regulate the processing and use of personal data collected on the internet.

=== Authority ===
In 2022, the LGPD established the ANPD or the “National Data Protection Authority”, a government agency to oversee the protection of user data, impose regulations and procedures on the matter, conducting studies, debates, and hearings regarding how personal data is protected among other things. Currently the ANPD is composed of 8 different boards responsible for handling differences.

In 2024, Brazilian Supreme Court Justice Alexandre de Moraes banned Twitter/X for use within the country due to concerns related to misinformation being spread about the 2022 election. This incited Twitter/X owner Elon Musk to shut down all Brazilian offices. Twitter/X was reinstated on October 8, 2024, after complying with court orders and paying a 28 million reais fine.

Although Brazil operated under the internet being not restricted, there are numerous cases of Censorship in Brazil.

While some forms of gambling, such as slot machines or casinos, are illegal in Brazil, the country has amassed a large online gambling scene. The government has been urged to take steps to curb forms of online gambling, particularly sports betting. Critics allege that its growing popularity has contributed to a historic low in consumer spending, as the family spending on online gambling doubled from 2018 to 2024. Brazil has responded by restricting the advertising hours of gambling companies in order to limit their exposure to minors while also blocking sites that the government determines to have “irregular” forms of gambling. Additionally, in 2023, President Luiz Inácio Lula da Silva signed a law to tighten the regulation of online gambling companies by increasing their tax burden.

Loot boxes have also been a source of concern in Brazil. In 2021, Brazil's Public Prosecutor's Office began processing a Public Civil Action against video game companies that publish games with loot box mechanics, such as Activision and EA. The action says that the loot boxes’ randomized results and mandatory paywall make the mechanic a form of gambling akin to a slot machine, and thus should be illegal under Brazilian law. As of November 2024, the result is still being determined.

== Brazilian Internet phenomenon ==
The Brazilian Internet phenomenon is the massive adoption by Brazilians of an Internet service, exceeding the number of other nationalities using the service. A possible reason for this is shown on an IBOPE/NetRatings study that revealed that they overtook the U.S. in terms of time surfing on the internet and, as of 2004, were the people who spent the most time on the internet. This influx coincides with online aggression.

This phenomenon was clearly observed in 2003 on Fotolog.net (now Fotolog.com), when the number of Brazilians exceeded the number of users of all the other countries combined. The potential of the market of digital cameras was noticed as a result of this Fotolog.net mania. Such phenomenon happened with extreme rapidity in Google's social networking site Orkut. However, since it is common to find a person with multiple social network profiles, blogs and flogs or even fake registrations in these, statistics about which country has the most users may not always be reliable. On the other hand, a rumor (denied by Google) spread in Brazil claimed that Orkut users declaring themselves as being from this country could receive inferior services, leading many to register themselves as inhabitants of other countries. Thus, the percentage of Brazilians on these websites might be even higher.

In the 2000s, Brazil was also home to the highest number of MSN Messenger users, an instant messaging program that was very popular among teenagers. They have always adopted in great numbers such services as ICQ, IRC (BRASnet being one of the biggest IRC networks in the world), Gmail, Skype, Blogspot (Blogger released a service located in Brazil), and some defunct services like The Palace, Gooey and PowWow (chat program).

This probably explains why MSN Brasil and Yahoo! Brasil were relatively popular (in the 2000s), and may have contributed to AOL's failure in the Brazilian market, while UOL ranks highly in Alexa.

== Content ==
=== Websites ===
As of August 2024, Google and YouTube were the most popular websites in Brazil, with the former averaging around 6.5 billion visits per month and the latter 3 billion. Following them were social media networks, such as Instagram, WhatsApp, and Facebook, averaging around 400-600 million monthly visitors. ChatGPT has also become one of the most popular websites in Brazil, averaging around 200 millions visits per month. Among the top websites are also several Brazilian websites, including Globo.com, uol, and TudoCelular. Brazil's most popular local website is the Globo.com website, which is part of Grupo Globo, a private entertainment and mass media conglomerate and the largest media group in Brazil.

=== Social media ===
With the 5th largest social media usage in the world, Brazil had around 171 million social media users in 2023 and is projected to have around 195 million users by 2030. While the majority of the usage comes from Meta applications such as Facebook and Instagram, new applications such as TikTok and Telegram have increased competition in the social media market.

In 2014, Brazil had the second largest group of Facebook users at over 65 million, as well as the second most Twitter/X users. Twitter was quickly utilized upon its 2013 launch.

As of 2024, over 92% of Brazil's 172 million online user base use messaging apps. For 90% of the user base, their main online activity takes place on these apps. WhatsApp is the most popular messaging platform, used by 93% of social media users. Brazilians call WhatsApp ‘Zap-Zap’.

In 2021, Telegram became the second most downloaded messaging app with it being on 65% of Brazil's smartphones after Meta's privacy policy was reviewed.

The large percentage of internet users on messaging apps has made it the most used online platform in the country. Because of this, messaging platforms are a powerful tool for distributing and accessing online content. 57% of Brazil's internet users use Social Media as their primary source for news consumption.

=== Online gambling ===
In 2018 online gambling became authorized in Brazil, where about 96 companies manage 210 gambling websites. Over the next five years, there has been an exponential increase having 52 million people online gambling. In September 2024 most of the online gambling was centered on sports bets, where Bento (online gambling website for sports) had about 91.24 million visits, Bet365 (online gambling website for sports) had about 50.52 million visits, and Bet Fair (online gambling website for sports) had about 15.12 million visits.

=== Online gaming ===
Even before the recent passing of legislation to recognize video games as its own industry, Brazil was one of the fastest growing markets in gaming. In terms of player base, Brazil is the fifth largest market in the world.

Brazilian esports presently occupy the mobile games market far more than other platforms due to smartphone accessibility. Games like Free Fire have helped increase visibility for games, especially in Brazil's favelas.

=== Internet Memes ===
Brazil's first meme is widely recognized as Sanduíche-iche, which is a reference to an interview with Brazilian nutritionist Ruth Lemos where, when saying “sanduíche”, she stutters and says “sanduíche-iche”. The clip was posted on video sharing sites like YouTube, where it went viral, becoming a nationally recognized slogan.

Brazil's meme culture has been described as “oblique” and “self deprecating” while also reflecting many of the current political issues present. There have been a notable amount of internet memes that have originated from Brazil. Some of these memes have gone on to be spread internationally, such as Math Lady. Additionally, Brazil has engaged with memes from other countries as well, such as when Harambe, a gorilla who after being shot by a zoo worker became an internet phenomenon, was displayed at Brazil's 2017 Carnival.

== See also ==
- .br top level domain
- Brazilian Internet Phenomenon
- Internet censorship in Brazil
- List of countries by number of Internet users
- List of countries by number of Internet hosts
- List of countries by number of broadband Internet subscriptions
- List of internet service providers in Brazil
