= Vivendi =

French investment company

Vivendi SE
- Logo used since 2006

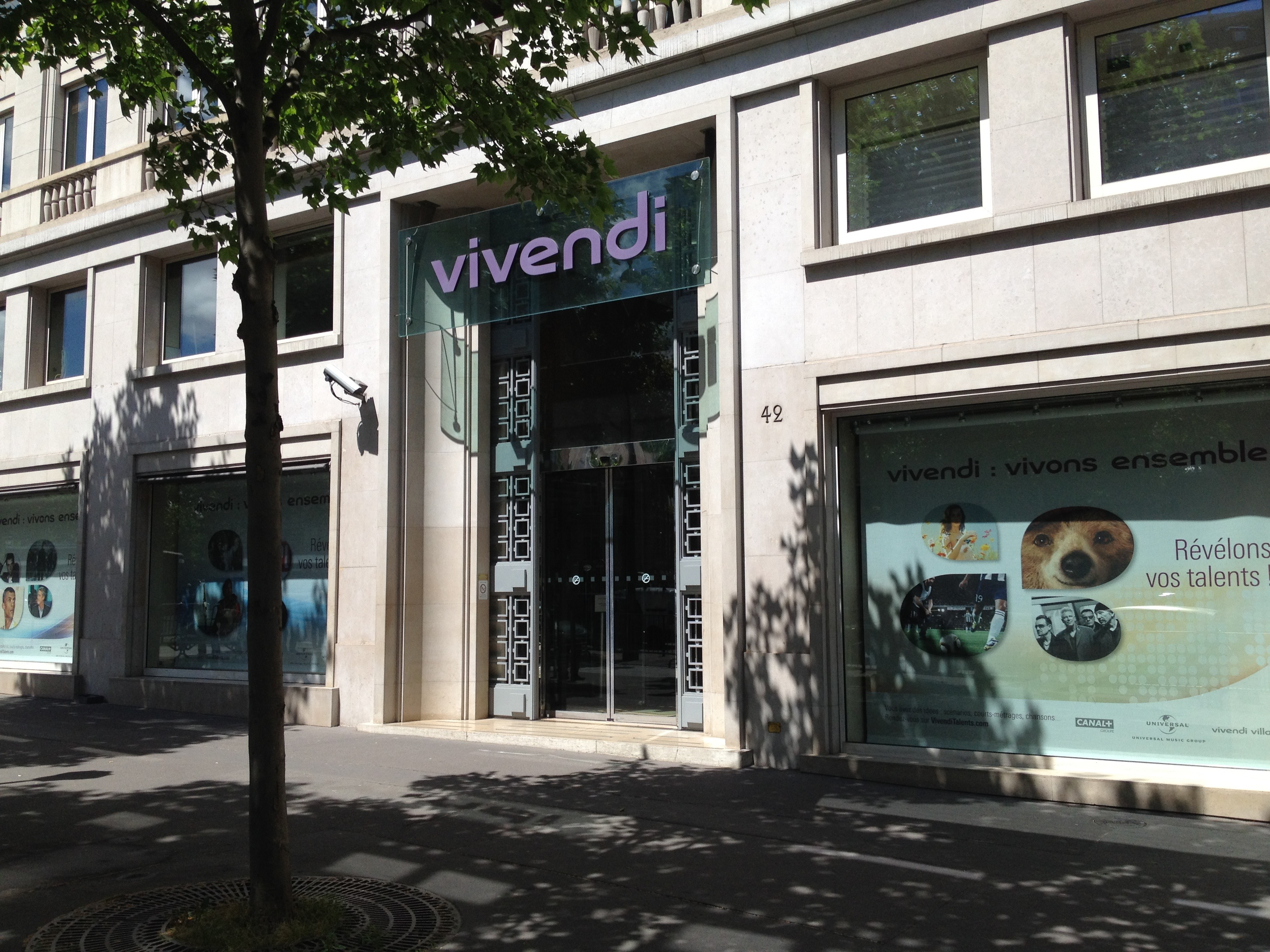
- Vivendi's headquarters in Paris
- Formerly: Compagnie générale des eaux (1853–1998); Vivendi SARL (1998–2000); Vivendi Universal SA (2000–2006); Vivendi SA (2006–2021)
- Type: Public
- Traded as: Euronext Paris: VIV; CAC Mid 60 component; NYSE: V (until 2006)
- ISIN: FR0000127771
- Industry: Investment
- Founded: 14 December 1853; 172 years ago
- Founder: Napoleon III
- Headquarters: Paris, France
- Area served: Worldwide
- Key people: Yannick Bolloré (chairman); Arnaud de Puyfontaine (CEO); François Laroze (CFO)
- Revenue: €307 million (2025)
- Operating income: ▲€45 million (EBITA) (2025)
- Net income: €20 million (2025)
- Total assets: ▼€6.95 billion (2025)
- Total equity: ▲€4.70 billion (2025)
- Owner: Bolloré (29.3% equity)
- Number of employees: 38,000
- Subsidiaries: Gameloft
- Website: vivendi.com

Vivendi SE (stylized in all lowercase) is a French investment company headquartered in Paris. It wholly owns Gameloft as well as investments in companies, primarily involved in content, entertainment, media, and telecommunications.

In 2000, Vivendi Universal was created from the merger of Groupe Canal+ and Seagram Company Ltd., owner of Universal Studios and Universal Music Group. Vivendi sold 80% of Vivendi Universal Entertainment (including Universal Studios) to General Electric (GE, owner of NBC) in 2004, forming NBCUniversal. In 2006, its name was reverted to Vivendi. GE bought out Vivendi's 20% stake in NBCUniversal during Comcast's acquisition of the latter.

From 2021, Vivendi began spinning off its wholly owned assets in order to become an investment company. The process started with the floating of 60% of Universal Music Group, the world's largest music business and owned since the creation of Vivendi Universal. In 2024, this process concluded with the spin-off of three of its other fully owned assets into three companies: Canal+ (entertainment), Havas (advertising), and Louis Hachette Group (publishing, distribution, and travel retail). Other investments include stakes in Banijay Group and MediaForEurope.

== History ==
=== Origins ===
Original Vivendi logo

On 14 December 1853, a water company named Compagnie générale des eaux (CGE) was created by an imperial decree of Napoleon III. In 1854, CGE obtained a concession in order to supply water to the public in Lyon, serving in that capacity for over a hundred years. In 1861, it obtained a 50-year concession with the City of Paris. CGE also supplied water to Nantes, Venice (from 1880), Istanbul (from 1882) and Porto (from 1883).

Following the appointment of Guy Dejouany as CEO in 1976, CGE extended its activities into other sectors with a series of takeovers. Beginning in 1980, CGE began diversifying from water into waste management, energy, transport services, and construction and property. It acquired the Compagnie générale d'entreprises automobiles (CGEA), specialized in industrial vehicles, which was later divided into two branches: Connex (later Veolia Transport) in 1999 and Onyx Environnement (later Veolia Environmental Services) in 1989. CGE then acquired the Compagnie générale de chauffe, and the Montenay group, with these companies later becoming the Energy Services division of CGE, and later renamed "Dalkia" in 1998.

In 1983, CGE helped to found Canal+, the first pay-TV channel in France, and in the 1990s began expanding into telecommunications and mass media, especially after Jean-Marie Messier succeeded Guy Dejouany on 27 June 1996, acquiring companies such as the Babelsberg Studio. In 1996, CGE created Neuf Cegetel to take advantage of the 1998 deregulation of the French telecommunications market, accelerating the move into the media sector which would culminate in the 2000 demerger into Vivendi Universal and Vivendi Environnement (Veolia).

=== Creation of Vivendi ===
Vivendi Universal logo from 2001 to 2006

On 27 March 1998, days after agreeing to fully acquire Havas, Compagnie Générale des Eaux announced it was changing its name to Vivendi. In 2000, it sold off its property and construction divisions the following year to what would become Vinci SA. Vivendi went on to acquire stakes in or merge with Cendant Software, Grupo Anaya, and Maroc Telecom. Beginning in 1998, Vivendi launched digital channels in Italy, Spain, Poland, Scandinavia, Belgium, and the Netherlands.

In June 1999, Vivendi merged with Pathé, and the exchange ratio for the merger was fixed at three Vivendi shares for every two Pathé shares. The Wall Street Journal estimated the value of the deal at US$2.59 billion. Following the completion of the merger, Vivendi retained Pathé's interests in British Sky Broadcasting Group PLC and CanalSatellite, a French broadcasting corporation, then sold all remaining assets to Jérôme Seydoux's family-owned holding company, Fornier SA, which changed its name to Pathé.

==== Vivendi Universal ====
On 9 December 2000, Vivendi acquired Groupe Canal+, the French television network and film production company. On 11 December 2000, Vivendi Universal was created from the merger of Groupe Canal+, Canadian company Seagram Company Ltd (owner of Universal Studios), and Vivendi. That same day, Havas S.A. became Vivendi Universal Publishing.

Vivendi Universal acquired MP3.com and the leading American publisher Houghton Mifflin in 2001. To raise the funds, Vivendi Universal sold its remaining 9.9% stake in Havas Advertising to institutional investors and its trade and medical publishing businesses to a group led by Cinven.

==== Vivendi Environnement ====
Vivendi Environnement was formed in 1999 by Vivendi to consolidate its environmental divisions, which were CGEA Transport, Onyx Environnement (now Veolia Environmental Services), Dalkia and CGE water division. As a result, CGEA Transport was renamed Connex (later Veolia Transport), and CGE's water division was renamed Vivendi Water (now Veolia Water). In July 2000, Vivendi Environnement was divested through IPOs in Paris and later New York in October 2001. Initially, Vivendi Universal retained a 70% stake in Vivendi Environnement in 2000, but by December 2002, it was reduced to 20.4%. In 2003, Vivendi Environnement was renamed to Veolia Environnement.

=== Corporate loss ===
Vivendi Universal disclosed a corporate loss of €23.3 billion in its 2002 annual report. It responded with financial reshuffling, trying to shore up media holdings while selling off shares in its spin-off companies. Amid intense media scrutiny, its chairman and CEO, Jean-Marie Messier (who had overseen the most dramatic phase of the company's diversification), was subsequently replaced by Jean-René Fourtou. Messier was found guilty of embezzlement in 2011, but not before he was paid over US$20 million as part of his severance package. The company reduced its stake in Vivendi Environnement to 40% and sold its stake in Vinci SA. The company then began reorganizing to stave off bankruptcy, announcing a strategy to sell non-strategic assets. Its largest single shareholder was the family of Edgar Bronfman Jr., who was head of Seagram at the time of the merger. Vivendi sold its stake in Vizzavi to Vodafone, with the exception of Vizzavi France. It also sold 20.4% of Vivendi Environnement's capital to a group of investors, and its stake in North American satellite operator EchoStar Communications Corporation. It also sold Vivendi Universal Publishing to Natexis Banque Populaire on behalf of Lagardère, resulting in the creation of Editis. It also sold Houghton Mifflin to Thomas H Lee, Blackstone and Bain consortium for US$1.66 billion. Also, in 2002, Vivendi Universal sold the Belgian and Dutch activities of its subsidiary Scoot Europe to Kapitol, the parent company of online directory Infobel.

In 2003, Vivendi Universal sold Canal+ Technologies to Thomson SA; Tele+ to News Corporation and Telecom Italia. It also sold its 26.3% interest in Xfera. Also in 2003, it sold its consumer magazines to Socpresse and its free newspapers to France Antilles. On 1 December, Vivendi Universal closed a deal to sell MP3.com to CNET. Despite predictions that it would be unable to raise the cash needed, Vivendi Universal bought out one of the two minority shareholders in Cegetel, taking its holding to 60 percent, with Vodafone holding the remaining 40 percent. Management viewed the mobile communications firm as a core asset once the bulk of media assets had been sold off.

=== Further acquisitions, mergers and divestments ===
On 12 May 2004, 80% of Vivendi Universal Entertainment (owner of Universal Studios) was sold to General Electric (owner of National Broadcasting Company, Inc.) to form NBC Universal; GE held an 80% stake while Vivendi held a 20% stake in the new company. At the same time, it sold a 50% stake in Canal+ and StudioCanal to the new company. Vivendi also sold its interests in Kencell (re-branded Celtel, Kenya), Monaco Telecom and Sportfive (which it held through Canal+ Group), and sold Newsworld International to the business partnership of Joel Hyatt and former Vice-President of the United States Al Gore. Vivendi also sold Babelsberg Studio.

On 16 December 2005, it was announced that Canal Plus would merge with TPS, France's second largest pay-TV provider. Vivendi owned 85% of the combined entity.

On 17 January 2006, Vivendi Universal announced it would end its American Depositary Receipt program and its listing on the New York Stock Exchange by the end of the second quarter of 2006, due to lowered trading volume on its shares and high costs. On 20 April, the company announced that shareholders had approved the name change to "Vivendi". In August, Vivendi signed a deal with Spiralfrog to distribute Vivendi's songs online in the United States and Canada.

On 2 December 2007, Vivendi announced that it would be merging its game publishing unit with Activision in a $18.8 billion deal. This allowed the merged company, Activision Blizzard, to rival Electronic Arts, the world's biggest video game publisher. The merger closed on 9 July 2008, for $9.8 billion. Vivendi held a 52% majority stake in the new business.

On 8 September 2009, Vivendi announced negotiations to buy the Brazilian phone operator Global Village Telecom (GVT). Vivendi took control of GVT at a cost of 56 reais per share on 13 November, trumping Telefónica's bid. Geneva-based Crédit des Alpes was the investment bank for the transaction, originating the acquisition proposal and advising GVT's majority shareholders.

On 3 December 2009, GE announced it would purchase Vivendi's stake in NBC Universal, which would become a joint venture between GE and Comcast. Vivendi sold its stake in NBC Universal on 25 January 2011.

On 4 April 2011, Vodafone sold its 44% stake in French mobile service provider SFR to Vivendi for about $11 billion and gave Vivendi full control of its largest unit.

In 2012, Vivendi announced having entered a strategic review of its assets and decided to refocus its activities on media and content activities while maximizing its telecoms assets.

On 25 July 2013, Activision Blizzard announced the buyout of 429 million shares from Vivendi for $5.83 billion, dropping the shareholder from a 63% stake to 11.8% by the end of the deal in September, ending Vivendi's majority ownership of Activision Blizzard. In November, Vivendi also sold its 53% stake in Maroc Telecom to Dubai-based Etisalat for around $4.2 billion. Vivendi also confirmed in November 2013 its intention to launch a demerger plan which would result in Vivendi becoming an international media group consisting primarily of Canal+, Universal Music Group, and GVT, while SFR would be listed separately on the stock market. As a result of the foregoing, Vivendi Group results for the first semester of 2014 are in strong growth, witnessing the success of its repositioning strategy. Net income was up 84,8% to €1.9 billion. In August 2014 Vivendi sold GVT to Telefônica Vivo, a subsidiary of Telefónica in Brazil.

The moves allowed Vivendi to pay down debt and increase cash returns to shareholders while leaving it able to do acquisitions of its own. After the SFR deal closes, Vivendi was expected to have around €5 billion, leaving it with some room to maneuver even after it pays down debt and returns nearly €5 billion in dividends and share buybacks to shareholders.

In 2014, Vivendi decided to sell mobile companies SFR (France) to Patrick Drahi's company, Altice, and GVT (Brazil) to the Brazilian company Telefônica Vivo. On 28 May, Vivendi sold half of its remaining shares (nearly 41.5 million shares) in Activision Blizzard for $850 million, reducing its stake to 6%.

In April 2015, it was announced that a shareholder in the company Bolloré raised its stake from 10.2 percent to 12.01 percent for a total fee of €568 million. In 2015, Vivendi bought an 80% share in Dailymotion. According to the Wall Street Journal, the "French media group offered around $273 million for streaming service". Vivendi was in talks with Orange to buy an 80% stake in Dailymotion. Also, Vivendi announced extra payouts in compromise with P. Schoenfeld Asset Management shareholder. It was revealed in October 2015 that Vivendi would increase its stake in Telecom Italia to around 19% of the ordinary share capital as part of its aims to increase its influence in the group. As of May 2017, Vivendi owns 24.6% of the company with Vivendi's CEO Arnaud de Puyfontaine becoming Executive Chairman of Telecom Italia. In October, Vivendi bought minority stakes in the French video game studios Gameloft and Ubisoft. On 17 December 2015, Vivendi acquired a 64.4% majority stake in Belgian online radio aggregator Radionomy (including its media player platform Winamp and internet radio streaming software Shoutcast). Its shareholders, including its employees and American-based investment firm Union Square Ventures, however, retained their stakes in the company.

In June 2016, after having triggered a mandatory tender offer in February 2016 by reaching 30% ownership, and then becoming its largest shareholder, Vivendi completed a hostile takeover of Gameloft with the acquisition of its founders' stake. At the same time, Vivendi also further increased its stake in Ubisoft, which had led to concern from the company's management that Vivendi was also planning a hostile takeover of Ubisoft, however as of 2018 Vivendi is no longer in the position to do so. Vivendi (once the owner of Blizzard, later Activision Blizzard), searching for a new games publisher property has started investing in both Ubisoft and Gameloft. The brothers in charge of Ubisoft and Gameloft, Yves Guillemot and Michel Guillemot respectively, view the investments as a hostile takeover attempt, and are raising capital from within the family and from Canadian investors to maintain control of the companies. As of 8 June 2016, Vivendi has acquired a controlling stake in Gameloft. In news from 11 September 2016, Yves Guillemot is set to buy an additional 3.5% of Ubisoft shares to raise his stake to 12.5% to attempt to block a takeover from Vivendi. Yves has been attempting to lobby other shareholders to prevent them from selling their shares to Vivendi. As of 20 March 2018, Vivendi has sold all its shares in Ubisoft, and Tencent has bought in in their place. In an auction on 6 June, Vivendi won a bid to acquire Flavorus from SFX Entertainment for $4 million. Also that month, it acquired Paddington and Company Limited-owner of Paddington Bear and other properties—and The Copyrights Group. Vivendi declared that it owned 12.3% of Mediaset in December 2016. In September 2020, Vivendi owns 28.8% of Mediaset. In January 2019, Vivendi completed its €900 million acquisition of Editis, one of France's major book publishers.

In 2019, Vivendi acquired Nigeria's film studio ROK Studios, which included its linear channels and VOD service, IROKO+.

At the end of the first quarter of 2020, Vivendi completed a partial sale of Universal Music Group (UMG) to a consortium led by Tencent, a Chinese media conglomerate. The amount of stake of the world's largest record label group that has been sold to the consortium is 10%, and the valuation of which was $3.3 billion. The Tencent-led consortium retained an option to purchase another 10% at the same valuation until January 2021, which they opted to exercise in December 2020. Pershing Square Holdings later acquired 10% of UMG prior to its IPO on the Euronext Amsterdam stock exchange. The company went public on 21 September 2021, at a valuation of €46 billion. In April, Vivendi bought a 10.6% stake in Lagardère Group, another French media group, the assets of which include the world's third-largest book publisher Hachette. By August 2020, Vivendi had doubled its stake in Lagardère to 23.5%, becoming the largest shareholder of the rival group. In October, Vivendi acquired a 12% stake in South Africa's media company, MultiChoice. In December, Vivendi announced a deal to buy the French media conglomerate Prisma Media from Bertelsmann. In January 2021, Vivendi bought a 9.9% stake in the Spanish media conglomerate Prisa. In April 2021, Vivendi acquired Prisma (in which the Bolloré Group is the main shareholder).

In September 2021, Vivendi distributed 60% of its UMG shares to shareholders and retained 10% of shares in an IPO at Euronext Amsterdam. Amber Capital informed Vivendi of its intention to sell all its shares in Lagardère (17.93% of the share capital) and invited Vivendi to make an acquisition offer. Vivendi has acquired Amber Capital's shares for 24.1 euros per share. The transaction will be completed by 15 December 2022, after gaining the approvals required by the current regulations in light of the takeover that could result from the mandatory public offer following this acquisition. In December 2021, Vivendi announced its plan to accelerate the purchase of Amber's stake in Lagardère. As of June 2022, Vivendi owns 57.3% of Lagardère following the latter's IPO. Vivendi offered to divest the book publisher Editis, as Lagardère already owns Hachette.

In July 2022, Vivendi announced its plan to spin off Editis, anticipating the European competition regulators not to allow Editis and Lagardère Publishing to merge. In June 2023, Vivendi agreed to sell Editis to Czech billionaire Daniel Křetínský's Czech Media Invest. In July 2023, Vivendi announced that Prisma Media entered into exclusive negotiations with Groupe Figaro for the sale of Gala magazine. The transactions for Editis and Gala magazine were finalized in November 2023.

=== Split of entertainment, publishing, advertising, and investment businesses ===
On 13 December 2023, Vivendi announced that it was studying a split project to separate its three businesses, Canal+, Havas and its publishing unit (including its stake in Lagardère and Prisma Media) as well as Gameloft and its investments in other companies (Universal Music Group, TIM, MFE, Banijay, Prisa, Telefonica) into four separate companies. On 30 January 2024, the company's supervisory board approved the split project. On 22 July 2024, Vivendi announced that the publishing company post-split would become Louis Hachette Group while Canal+ and Havas would be listed on the London Stock Exchange and Euronext Amsterdam respectively while LHG would trade on Euronext Paris. Canal+ would retain its French corporate status. On 29 October 2024, the company's supervisory board approved the split plan. Vivendi would retain its listing on the Euronext Paris and would continue its operations as an investment company. On 9 December 2024, Vivendi's shareholders approved the split project. The spin-off companies started trading on 16 December 2024.

In 2025, the €20 million net income resulted from the 2024 split of Vivendi into several entities, an operation that led to a €6 billion 'loss' for Vivendi due to capital losses from these deconsolidations. During 2025, Vivendi sold its stakes in TIM and Telefónica.

As of 31 December 2025, Vivendi owns 11.45% of the Universal Music Group, while notifying a short position of 3.49% as well.

== Description and location ==
The official name of the company is Vivendi SE (Societas Europaea). The headquarters are located at 42 Avenue Friedland, 75008 Paris.

== Corporate governance ==
As of 31 December 2024, Vivendi is owned by:

- Bolloré (29.90%)
- Vivendi employees (2.32%)
- Treasury shares (3.70%)
- Other shareholders (64.08%)

=== Supervisory board ===
As of 8 October 2025, the board is composed of the following:

- Yannick Bolloré (chairman); also CEO of Havas, which was spun off from Vivendi in 2024
- Philippe Bénacin, chairman and CEO of Interparfums
- Laurent Dassault, co-managing director of Dassault Group
- Laure Delahousse, managing director of Association Française de la Gestion Financière
- Maud Fontenoy, president of the Maud Fontenoy Foundation
- Cathia Lawson-Hall, executive of Société Générale
- Sandrine Le Bihan, Vivendi legal executive
- Bernard Osta, chief financial officer of Vestiaire Collective
- Katie Stanton, general partner of Moxxie Ventures

== Business units ==
Vivendi is a company primarily focused on digital entertainment. It currently owns the French video game company Gameloft.

Vivendi's president, Vincent Bolloré, appointed in June 2014, aims at developing synergies between the company's subsidiaries now refocused on media: Gameloft.

=== Gameloft ===
In July 2016, Vivendi completed its takeover of Gameloft, the world's largest mobile-games publisher in terms of downloads. Gameloft reported that its games had amassed over 1 billion downloads in 2016.

=== Equity investments ===
- Universal Music Group (7,96%)
- MFE (4.6%)
- PRISA (9.9%)
- Banijay Group (19.21%)

== Disinformation ==
In July 2024, Vivendi was alleged by Reporters Without Borders (RWB) to have been involved in a disinformation campaign against RWB. On 13 February 2024, in response to a request lodged by RWB, the Conseil d'État ordered CNews, part of the Vivendi group, to better respect journalistic standards and diversity. The February order by the Conseil d'État was followed by an intense disinformation campaign of hate speech against RWB. In July 2024, RWB published the results of its investigation into the disinformation campaign. Its findings included a fake website pretending to be run by RWB hosted on a server hosting "Fan de CNews", a fansite supporting CNews. The website was run by what RWB states is a disinformation agency called Progressif Media, hosted at Vivendi. The main investigator, Arnaud Froger, stated that Progressif Media used "counterfeiting, concealment, cybersquatting [and] trolling" as disinformation techniques against RWB.

== See also ==
- List of French companies
