= Gooey =

Gooey may refer to:

- Gooey (song), by Glass Animals, 2014
- Gooey (software), a chat application
- Gooey, a character from the Kirby franchise
