= NIC.br =

- Brazilian Network Information Center
- Núcleo de Informação e Coordenação do Ponto BR
- Named after: Network Information Centers (NICs)
- Formation: 2000; 26 years ago
- Type: Nonprofit civil entity
- Region served: Brazil
- Website: nic.br

The Núcleo de Informação e Coordenação do Ponto BR (English: Brazilian Network Information Center) is a non-profit organization created to implement the decisions and projects designed by the Brazilian Internet Steering Committee. Some of NIC.br's responsibilities include maintaining Registro.br, responsible for the .br domain name, handle internet security and network security in Brazil, handle infrastructure for the Internet in Brazil, and gather and publish statistics about internet usage in Brazil.

The organization is also responsible for the Brazilian chapter of the World Wide Web Consortium organization. In May 2020, CEPTRO.br launched the Layer 8 podcast, with monthly episodes to discuss issues related to Internet infrastructure, communication networks and technology.

== Membership and composition ==
According to NIC.br's by-laws, its membership is composed of three types of members: founding, special and honorary. Generally speaking, they are always full members, acting alternates or former members of the CGI.br. However, only the acting members of the CGI.br have the right to vote.

1. Founders: are those members of the CGI.br who were in office when NIC.br was constituted, those who were in office when its statute was approved.
2. Special: are those who, not being founders, become so at a later date.
3. Honorary: those founding or special members who are no longer full members of the CGI.br and, eventually, those who have rendered relevant services to the Brazilian Internet, according to the criteria and approval by the entity's General Assembly.

== Attributions ==
- The registration. and maintenance of domain names using .br, and the distribution of Autonomous System Numbers (ASN) and IPv4 and IPv6 addresses in the country, through Registro.br.
- Handling and responding to computer security incidents involving networks connected to the Internet in Brazil, activities of CERT.br.
- Creating projects which support or improve the country's network infrastructure, such as the direct interconnection between networks (PTT.br) and the distribution of Brazilian Legal Time. These projects are the responsibility of CEPTRO.br;
- The production and disclosure of indicators and statistics and strategic information on the development of the Internet in Brazil, under the responsibility of CETIC.br;
- To promote studies and recommend procedures, norms and technical and operational standards, for the security of Internet networks and services, as well as for its increasing, facilitated and adequate use by the Brazilian society;
- Technical and operational support to LACNIC, the Latin American and Caribbean Internet Address Registry.
- Hosting the Brazilian Office of the W3C, whose main attribution is to develop Web standards.

== See also ==
- CGI.br (Brazilian Internet Steering Committee)
- IX.br
- Registro.br
- Brazilian Civil Rights Framework for the Internet

== Bibliography ==
- "História do NIC.br" [NIC.br's history]. NIC.br (in Brazilian Portuguese).
