= .br =

Top-level Internet domain for Brazil

- Introduced: 18 April 1989
- TLD type: Country code top-level domain (ccTLD)
- Status: Active
- Registry: Registro.br
- Sponsor: CGI.br
- Intended use: Entities connected with Brazil
- Actual use: Very popular in Brazil
- Registered domains: 5,388,244 (2024-09-09)
- Registration restrictions: Varying restrictions based on which second-level name registration is within. In all cases the registrant must have either a CPF or CNPJ, documents usually granted only to Brazilian residents or recognized companies
- Structure: Registrations at third level beneath various categories (but .com.br is still much more popular than others); Second-level registrations were allowed for institutions of higher education until 2000
- DNSSEC: yes
- Registry website: registro.br

.br is the Internet country code top-level domain (ccTLD) for Brazil. It was administered by the Brazilian Internet Steering Committee until 2005 when it started being administered by Brazilian Network Information Center. A local contact is required for any registration. Registrations of domain names with Portuguese characters are also accepted.

With the exception of universities, the second-level domain is fixed and selected from a list that defines the category. For example, .art.br is in the art (music, folklore etc.) category, and .org.br is in the non-governmental organization category. Institutions of tertiary education were allowed to use the ccSLD .edu.br, although some use .com.br and others (mainly public universities) use .br. There are also some other few exceptions that were allowed to use the second level domain until the end of 2000. As of April 2010, most domain registrations ignore categories and register in the .com.br domain, which has over 90% of all registered domains. The .jus.br (Judiciary), and .b.br (banks) domains have mandatory DNSSEC use.

== History ==
Created and delegated to Brazil in 1989 by Jon Postel, initially the domain was operated manually by Registro.br and administered by the Fundação de Amparo à Pesquisa do Estado de São Paulo (FAPESP). Originally, only researchers and institutions to which they belonged had the interest and ability to adopt the new system and register domains under .br.

At the time, networks prevalent in the Brazilian academic setting were the BITNET ("Because It's Time NETwork"), the HEPnet ("High Energy Physics Network") and the UUCP ("Unix-to-Unix Copy Program"). As such, even before Brazil officially connected to the Internet in 1991, the .br domain was used to identify the machines participating in networks already in use by academics.

In 1995 the Brazilian Internet Steering Committee (Portuguese: Comitê Gestor da Internet no Brasil, or simply CGI.br) was created with an objective to coordinate the allocation of Internet addresses (IPs) and the registration of .br domain names. There were 851 domains registered with the Brazilian DNS by the beginning of 1996, thereafter experiencing rapid growth with the mass arrival of companies, Internet providers and media onto the Internet. The registration system was automated in 1997 and was developed using open source software.

In 2005, CGI.br created its own executive arm, the Brazilian Network Information Center (Portuguese: Núcleo de Informação e Coordenação do Ponto BR, or simply NIC.br), which currently serves in both administrative and operational capacity for the registry.

In 2017, accounts associated with DNS records of Brazilian banks were hacked. Kaspersky's researchers pointed out to a vulnerability in NIC.br's website and suggested its infrastructure had been compromised. NIC's director at the time, Frederico Neves, denied that NIC.br was "hacked", although NIC.br admitted the vulnerability.

== Domain registry ==
To register any domains under .br, it is necessary to enter into contact with Registro.br. Entities legally established in Brazil as a company ("pessoa jurídica") or a physical person ("profissional liberal" and "pessoas físicas") that has a contact within Brazil can register domains. Foreign companies that have a power-of-attorney legally established in Brazil can also do it by following specific rules.

The registration of domains including non-ASCII Portuguese characters (à, á, â, ã, é, ê, í, ó, ô, õ, ú, ü and ç) is accepted since 2005.

=== Syntactic rules for .br domains ===
- Minimum of 2 and maximum of 26 characters, not including the category. For example, in the field XXXX.COM.BR, this limitation relates to the XXXX.
- Valid characters are [A-Z, 0-9], the hyphen, and the following accented characters: à, á, â, ã, é, ê, í, ó, ô, õ, ú, ü, ç.
- Domains cannot contain only numbers.
- To maintain the integrity of the registry, Registro.br sets up an equivalence mapping to compare domain names with and without accented characters. The mapping is done by converting accented characters and the cedilla for their non-accented versions and "c", respectively, and discards hyphens. A new domain will only be allowed to be registered when there is no equivalent to a pre-existing domain, or when the applicant is the same entity that owns the domain equivalent.

Specifically for the domain .NOM.BR, it is necessary to choose two names, i.e.: NAME1.NAME2.NOM.BR.

== Second-level domains ==
=== Direct registration ===
In 1991, it was decided that universities and research institutes would be allowed second-level .br domains directly. For example: Federal University of Rio de Janeiro got ufrj.br; University of São Paulo got usp.br; National Institute for Space Research got inpe.br; and so on.

In late 2000, the Brazilian Internet Steering Committee reported abuse in this system, and called for all institutions directly under .br to be moved to .edu.br – so, for example, ufrj.br would become ufrj.edu.br. During a meeting in early 2001, however, the Committee decided it would be of public interest to not move every second-level domain as to avoid confusion, but instead established rules regarding their registration:

- No longer accepting automatic registration of second-level domains, and evaluating every request for one individually;
- Creating edu.br, and forwarding requests from education and research institutions to it;
- Concession to education and research institutes that already had a second-level .br domain, as long as its usage is appropriate and that domain name is related to the institution's name or acronym. Domains approved are automatically duplicated under edu.br as well, and both may exist concurrently – for example, the still existing ufrj.br also has a registered ufrj.edu.br, although the latter is not used;
- Other institutions not approved above must be migrated permanently to edu.br (but would be given sufficient time for the transition).

As of September 2024, Registro.br reports 1207 domains registered directly under .br.

=== Predefined domains ===
As of August 2025, there are 147 different second-level domains of .br under which custom domains can be registered, and they are divided into eleven categories: "Generic", "Business", "Culture", "Education", "Personals", "Entertainment", "Public Authority", "Locations", "Professions", "Technology" and "Third Sector". They are the following:

"Generic" second-level .br domains
Domain	Intended use
COM.br	Commercial activities
NET.br	Commercial activities
SOCIAL.br	Social networks
XYZ.br	Miscellaneous
WIKI.br	Wiki-like pages
ETC.br	Companies that do not fit into other categories

"Culture" second-level .br domains
Domain	Intended use
ART.br	Arts: music, painting, folklore
REC.br	Recreational activities, games
TV.br	Broadcasting companies or "transmission of sounds and images via the Internet"
AM.br	Radio companies
FM.br	Radio companies
RADIO.br	"Companies wishing to transmit audio through the network"

"Business" second-level .br domains
Domain	Intended use
ECO.br	Eco- or environment focused activities
LOG.br	Transport and logistics
EMP.br	Small and micro-enterprises
LEILAO.br	Auctioneers (Note: Requires authorization by the Federação das Juntas Comerciais (Federation of Commercial Registries).)
AGR.br	Agriculture- or farm-related companies
FAR.br	Pharmacies and drugstores
IMB.br	Real estate agencies
IND.br	Industries
INF.br	Media and information (radios, newspapers, libraries, ...)
SRV.br	Work for hire
TMP.br	Temporary events, such as fairs and expos
TUR.br	Tourism-related companies
PSI.br	Internet service providers
B.br	Banks (Note: Requires DNSSEC.)

"Education" second-level .br domains
Domain	Intended use
EDU.br	Higher education institutions
G12.br	Primary or secondary schools (K–12 equivalent)

"Personals" second-level .br domains
Domain	Intended use
BLOG.br	Web logs
NOM.br	Natural persons

"Entertainment" second-level .br domains
Domain	Intended use
BET.br	Online gambling
FLOG.br	Photo logs
QSL.br	Amateur radio operators
VLOG.br	Video logs
ESP.br	Sport in general

"Public Authority" second-level .br domains
Domain	Intended use
GOV.br	Federal government institutions
MIL.br	Brazilian Armed Forces
DEF.br	Public defenders
JUS.br	Judiciary institutions
LEG.br	Legislative institutions
MP.br	Public Ministry institutions
TC.br	Tribunal de Contas da União

"Locations" second-level .br domains
Domain	Intended use
9GUACU.br	Nova Iguaçu, Rio de Janeiro
ABC.br	ABC Region, São Paulo
AJU.br	Aracaju, Sergipe
ANANI.br	Ananindeua, Pará
APARECIDA.br	Aparecida, São Paulo
BARUERI.br	Barueri, São Paulo
BELEM.br	Belém, Pará
BHZ.br	Belo Horizonte, Minas Gerais
BOAVISTA.br	Boa Vista, Roraima
BSB.br	Brasília, Federal District
CAMPINAGRANDE.br	Campina Grande, Paraíba
CAMPINAS.br	Campinas, São Paulo
CAXIAS.br	Duque de Caxias, Rio de Janeiro
CONTAGEM.br	Contagem, Minas Gerais
CUIABA.br	Cuiabá, Mato Grosso
CURITIBA.br	Curitiba, Paraná
FEIRA.br	Feira de Santana, Bahia
FLORIPA.br	Florianópolis, Santa Catarina
FORTAL.br	Fortaleza, Ceará
FOZ.br	Foz do Iguaçu, Paraná
GOIANIA.br	Goiânia, Goiás
GRU.br	Guarulhos, São Paulo
JAB.br	Jaboatão dos Guararapes, Pernambuco
JAMPA.br	João Pessoa, Paraíba
JDF.br	Juiz de Fora, Minas Gerais
JOINVILLE.br	Joinville, Santa Catarina
LONDRINA.br	Londrina, Paraná
MACAPA.br	Macapá, Amapá
MACEIO.br	Maceió, Alagoas
MANAUS.br	Manaus, Amazonas
MARINGA.br	Maringá, Paraná
MORENA.br	Campo Grande, Mato Grosso do Sul
NATAL.br	Natal, Rio Grande do Norte
NITEROI.br	Niterói, Rio de Janeiro
OSASCO.br	Osasco, São Paulo
PALMAS.br	Palmas, Tocantins
POA.br	Porto Alegre, Rio Grande do Sul
PVH.br	Porto Velho, Rondônia
RECIFE.br	Recife, Pernambuco
RIBEIRAO.br	Ribeirão Preto, São Paulo
RIO.br	Rio de Janeiro, Rio de Janeiro
RIOBRANCO.br	Rio Branco, Acre
RIOPRETO.br	São José do Rio Preto, São Paulo
SALVADOR.br	Salvador, Bahia
SAMPA.br	São Paulo, São Paulo
SANTAMARIA.br	Santa Maria, Rio Grande do Sul
SANTOANDRE.br	Santo André, São Paulo
SAOBERNARDO.br	São Bernardo do Campo, São Paulo
SAOGONCA.br	São Gonçalo, Rio de Janeiro
SJC.br	São José dos Campos, São Paulo
SLZ.br	São Luís, Maranhão
SOROCABA.br	Sorocaba, São Paulo
THE.br	Teresina, Piauí
UDI.br	Uberlândia, Minas Gerais
VIX.br	Vitória, Espírito Santo

"Professionals" second-level .br domains
Domain	Intended use
ADM.br	Administrators
ADV.br	Lawyers
ARQ.br	Architecture
ATO.br	Actors
BIB.br	Librarians and library scientists
BIO.br	Biologists
BMD.br	Biomedical scientists
CIM.br	Realtors
CNG.br	Scenographers
CNT.br	Accountants
COZ.br	Gastronomists
DES.br	Designers and illustrators
DET.br	Detectives and private investigator
ECN.br	Economists
ENF.br	Nurses
ENG.br	Engineers
ETI.br	IT professionals
FND.br	Speech–language pathologist
FOT.br	Photographers
FST.br	Physical therapistss
GEO.br	Geologists
GGF.br	Geography professionals
JOR.br	Journalists
LEL.br	Auctioneers
MAT.br	Mathematicians and statisticians
MED.br	Medical doctors
MUS.br	Musicians
NOT.br	Notaries
NTR.br	Nutritionists
ODO.br	Dentists
PPG.br	Publicists and marketeers
PRO.br	Teachers and professors
PSC.br	Psychologists
REP.br	Commercial representatives
SLG.br	Sociologists
TAXI.br	Taxi drivers
TEO.br	Theologists
TRD.br	Translators
VET.br	Veterinarians
ZLG.br	Zoologists

"Technology" second-level .br domains
Domain	Intended use
API.br	Application interfaces
APP.br	Apps
DEV.br	Developers and development platforms
IA.br	Artificial intelligence
SEG.br	Security
TEC.br	Technology

"Third Sector" second-level .br domains
Domain	Intended use
COOP.br	Cooperatives
ONG.br	Non-governmental organizations
ORG.br	Not-for-profit non-governmental organizations

==== Special second-level domains ====
From 2000 until 2009, during election cycles, electoral candidates could register domains under CAN.br, with the format [name][number].can.br – where the name is the registered candidate name, and the number is the identification number for that candidate in the election (related to the party's identification number). The second-level domain was in a category of its own, called "natural persons, special".

As an example, during the 2004 elections for mayor of Aracaju:

- Marcelo Déda had the website deda13.can.br (his surname and Worker's Party's identification number, 13);
- Susana Azevedo had the website susana23.can.br (her first name and Cidadania's identification number, 23);
- Jorge Alberto had the website jorgealberto15.can.br (his name and MDB's identification number, 15).

Domains were free for registered candidates. Additionally, domains were automatically cancelled at the end of the first round if the candidate lost, and remaining ones were cancelled after the end of the second round.

No new .can.br domains have been registered since 2009.

==== Online gambling ====
In late 2024, legislation regulating online gambling in Brazil – usually referred to simply as "bets" in the country – was passed. Among the stipulations was that, from January 2025 onward, such companies must operate under a BET.br domain. By definition, any online gambling websites not operating under a .bet.br domain are operating illegally.

=== Agencies ===
There are multiple agencies registered directly under .br, as second-level domains, that are not higher education or research institutions. The following list might not be exhaustive:

Agencies on second-level .br domains
Domain	Domain meaning	Description
CGI.br	Acronym for "Comitê Gestor da Internet" (lit. 'Internet Administration Committee')	The Committee establishes strategic directives related to the use and development of the internet in Brazil, directives for the registration of domain names, IP allocation and administration regarding the .br TLD
NIC.br	Acronym for Network Information Center	Created to implement decisions and projects of the Committee (CGI.br)
IX.br; PTT.br (old)	IX: Acronym for Internet eXchange; PTT: Acronym for "Ponto de Troca de Tráfego" (lit. 'Traffic Exchange Point')	Handles the internet exchange point system of Brazil
REGISTRO.br	Portuguese for "registration"	.br registry
CETIC.br	Acronym for "CEntro de Tecnologias de Informação e Comunicação" (lit. 'Center of Information and Communications Technology')	Officially called "Centro Regional de Estudos para o Desenvolvimento da Sociedade da Informação", it monitors the adoption of information and communications technology in Brazil
CEPTRO.br	Acronym for "Centro de Estudos e Pesquisas em Tecnologia de Redes e Operações" (lit. 'Center for Studies and Research in Network Technology and Operations')	Responsible for initiatives and projects that support or perfect the internet infrastructure in Brazil
CERT.br	Acronym for Computer Emergency Response Team	Has the mission to increase the security levels and incident handling capabilities regarding networks connected to Brazil's internet
CEWEB.br	Acronym for "Centro de Estudos sobre Tecnologias Web" (lit. 'Center for Studies on Web Technologies')	Has the mission to enable the participation of the Brazilian community in the global development of the web
W3C.br	W3C	Brazilian branch of the World Wide Web Consortium
NTP.br	Acronym for Network Time Protocol	Provides the legal, standard time for Brazil
IPV6.br	IPv6	Promote and disseminate IPv6 usage in Brazil
ANTISPAM.br	Anti-spam	Has the mission to inform users and network administrators about spam, its implications and forms of protection and combat
INTERNETSEGURA.br	Portuguese for "Safe Internet"	Has the mission to incentivize the safe use of the internet
ZAPPIENS.br	Named after Portugal's now defunct Zappiens.pt, managed by the FCCN	Has the mission to be a free service for the aggregation and distribution of audiovisual scientific, educational, artistic and cultural content in Portuguese

Most of these agencies are subsidiaries of CGI.br and, as such, they follow a similar corporate identity. The "logos" are combinations of the names of the agencies with the logo for .br, all of which are simply typed out with Brandon Schoech (Tepid Monkey)'s freeware font "Qhytsdakx":

Logo for .br, a slightly modified "br" in green

Logo for CGI.br

Logo for NIC.br

Logo for IX.br

Logo for Registro.br

Logo for IPv6.br

=== Networks ===
There are multiple networks registered directly under .br, usually of academic nature. Again, this list may not be exhaustive:

Networks on second-level .br domains
Domain	Domain meaning	Description
RNP.br; RNP2.br	Acronym for "Rede Nacional de ensino e Pesquisa" (lit. 'National Network of Education and Research')	An academic backbone of Brazilian internet
RCT-SC.br	Acronym for "Rede Catarinense de Ciência e Tecnologia" (lit. 'Santa Catarina Network for Science and Technology')	Academic network for the state of Santa Catarina
REDERIO.br	"Rede Rio" (lit. 'Rio Network')	Academic network for the state of Rio de Janeiro
REDNESP.br; ANSP.br (old)	Acronym for "Research and EDucation NEtwork at São Paulo"	Academic network for the state of São Paulo
TCHE.br	"Rede Tchê" (lit. 'Tchê Network'), named after the interjection common in the South of Brazil, tchê	Academic network for the South Region of Brazil

== Usage statistics ==
As of September 2024, .BR is the 9th most used TLD in the world and the 6th most used ccTLD, accounting for approximately 1.5% of all domain names. It is also the most used Portuguese language TLD. (Note: Counting existing domain names, as of September 2024: .BR had around 5,300,000; .PT had around 1,900,000; .ST had around 30,000; .GQ had around 15,000; .AO had around 12,000; .MZ had around 10,000; .CV had around 3,000; .MO had around 3,000; .TL had around 2,000; .RIO had around 700; .GW had around 400.)

Usage of the .BR space, highlighting its five most registered second-level domains
1. COM.BR (93.0%)
2. NET.BR (1.40%)
3. ORG.BR (0.99%)
4. ADV.BR (0.91%)
5. IND.BR (0.42%)
6. Other (3.24%)
Data as of 9 September 2024.

As of 9 September 2024, Registro.br's statistics page reported the following:

- 5,388,244 total domains registered under .BR;
- 1,629,955 (30.25%) domains using DNSSEC.

Second-level domain breakdown per category (see § Predefined domains)
Category	Total domain count	Most registered	Least registered
Generic	5,089,895 (94.46%)	COM.BR (5,013,151, or 93.04% of the total)	WIKI.BR (504, or 0.01% of the total)
Business	61,196 (1.14%)	IND.BR (22,884, or 0.42% of the total)	TMP.BR (148, or 0.003% of the total)
Culture	15,314 (0.28%)	ART.BR (10,235, or 0.19% of the total)	AM.BR (68, or 0.001% of the total)
Education	5,331 (0.1%)	EDU.BR (3,576, or 0.07% of the total)	G12.BR (548, or 0.01% of the total)
Personals	7,364 (0.14%)	BLOG.BR (6,176, or 0.11% of the total)	NOM.BR (1,188 each, or 0.02% of the total)
Entertainment	1,559 (0.03%)	ESP.BR (1,099, or 0.02% of the total)	QSL.BR (80, or 0.001% of the total)
Public Authority	1,687 (0.03%)	GOV.BR (1,273, or 0.02% of the total)	DEF.BR (28, or 0.001% of the total)
Locations	13,020 (0.24%)	RIO.BR (2,478, or 0.05% of the total)	SAOGONCA.BR (3, or 0.0001% of the total)
Professions	94,942 (1.76%)	ADV.BR (49,201, or 0.91% of the total)	ZLG.BR (6, or 0.0001% of the total)
Technology	40,489 (0.75%)	APP.BR (19,655, or 0.36% of the total)	SEG.BR (2,796, or 0.05% of the total)
Third Sector	57,447 (1.07%)	ORG.BR (53,108, or 0.99% of the total)	COOP.BR (1,447, or 0.03% of the total)

The "Education" category also includes 1,207 (0.02% of the total) custom second-level domains registered directly under .BR – for example, the National Observatory at ON.BR.

== See also ==
- Internet in Brazil
- .rio
