= Intelig Telecom =

Intelig Telecomunicações Ltda.

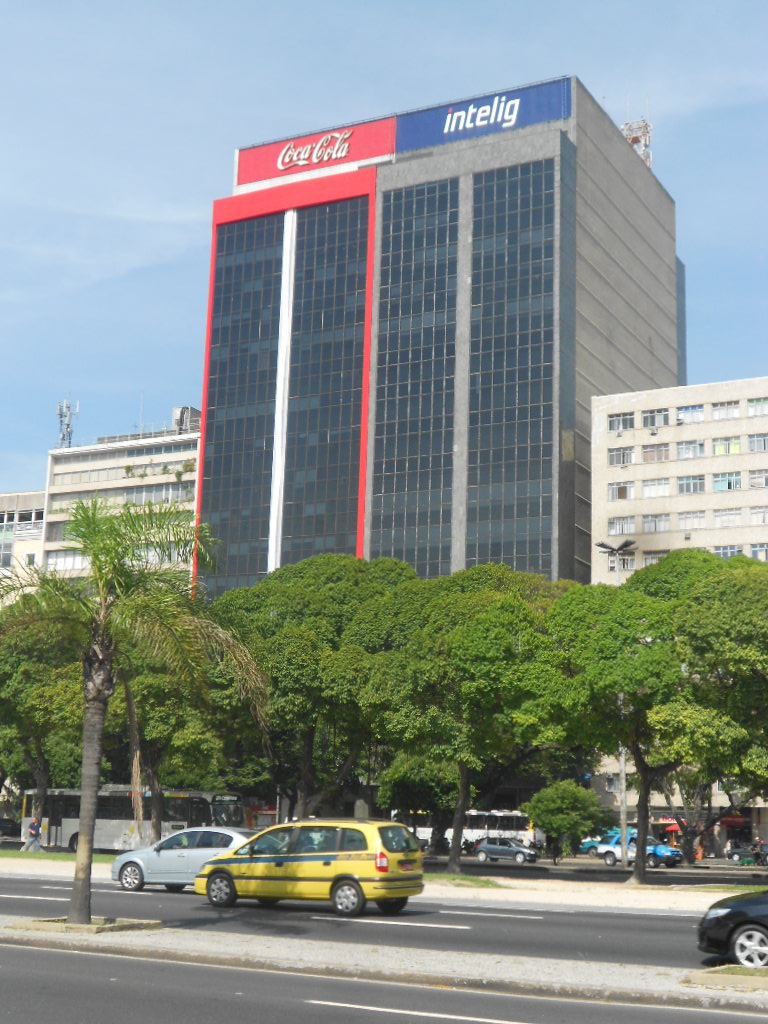
- Intelig Telecom's headquarters
- Type: Subsidiary
- Industry: Telecommunications
- Founded: January 23, 2000; 26 years ago
- Founder: National Grid; France Télécom; Sprint Corporation
- Defunct: April 16, 2009
- Fate: Merged into TIM Brasil
- Successor: TIM Brasil
- Headquarters: Rio de Janeiro, Brazil
- Area served: Brazil
- Products: Fixed-line telephony
- Revenue: ▲ R$ 740 million (2007)
- Owner: TIM Brasil (100%)
- Parent: Telecom Italia
- Website: www.inteligtelecom.com.br

Intelig Telecomunicações Ltda., commonly known as Intelig Telecom, was a Brazilian telecommunications company, that offered fixed-line telephony services.

It started operations on 23 January 2000, bringing for the first time concurrence on the long distance and international phone service. Local operations started in September 2003 and 2 years later, they launched a free dial-up Internet service, the InteligWeb. With an investment of R$2,8 billions, it started to build its infrastructure in 1999, even before entering operations. They have more than 16 thousand kilometers of fiber-optics in their network. Their headquarters are in Rio de Janeiro.

In 2009, it was bought by Italian-Brazilian operator TIM Brasil, joining the two codes: 23:41, with the impetus to compete primarily with national Oi, using the codes 31 and 14 (former Brasil Telecom), beyond Embratel/Claro, Vivo/Telefónica, GVT, and Nextel, both also multinationals.

== Operation ==
Intelig started as a mirror of Embratel on long distance and international phone service after the privatization of the Telebrás system. With the opening of long distance market in 2002, they implemented their product list with data service (VPN, DIP, ATM, etc.), local services, and hubbing for other telecommunications companies. Their current focus is the comparative market.

== Acquisition by TIM Brasil ==
On 16 April 2009 Telecom Italia, through TIM Brasil, announced the negotiation to buy Intelig. The negotiation have the objective to boost the TIM data infrastructure, that was suffering from the growth in users of its 3G services, On 6 August 2009 ANATEL granted authorization for the merge.

== See also ==
- List of internet service providers in Brazil
- Sanduíche-iche – meme used in a television advertisement for the company
- Telecom Italia
- TIM Brasil
