= HiSky (satellite communications company) =

Israeli satellite communications company

hiSky
- Type: Private
- Industry: Satellite communications, IoT, Defense
- Founded: May 2015; 11 years ago
- Founders: Shahar Kravitz; Moti Litochevski; Yaron Shachar
- Headquarters: Rosh HaAyin, Israel
- Area served: Worldwide
- Key people: Erez Antebi (CEO); Tamir Pardo (President)
- Products: Smartellite / SmartLITE satellite terminals; hiSky360 / SmartLITE NMS; hiSky Hub
- Services: Satellite Virtual Network Operator (SVNO) connectivity
- Number of employees: c. 70 (2024)
- Website: www.hiskysat.com

hiSky (legally hiSky Ltd. / hiSky SCS Ltd.) is an Israeli satellite communications company headquartered in Rosh HaAyin, Israel. Founded in 2015, it develops compact flat-panel satellite terminals and network management software, operating as a satellite virtual network operator (SVNO) to provide IoT, data, and voice connectivity over third-party GEO and LEO satellite networks.

== History ==
hiSky was established in May 2015 by Shahar Kravitz, Moti Litochevski, and Yaron Shachar. In June 2019, the company received a £9 million ($11.3 million) grant from the UK Space Agency, allocated through the European Space Agency, to establish a UK subsidiary (hiSkySat Limited) and a research and development center at the Harwell Science and Innovation Campus in Oxfordshire.

In December 2021, hiSky raised $30 million in a Series A funding round led by ST Engineering and the United Arab Emirates' Strategic Development Fund (Tawazun Holding), alongside existing backers including the Reuben Brothers. In early 2024, satellite operator Intelsat signed a strategic collaboration and investment agreement with the company. By May 2024, hiSky had raised approximately $60 million in total funding.

In January 2026, Erez Antebi (former CEO of Gilat Satellite Networks and SpaceIL) was appointed CEO, succeeding co-founder Shahar Kravitz.

== Products and operations ==
hiSky develops integrated flat-panel phased-array terminals and modems - marketed under the Smartellite and SmartLITE product lines—alongside the hiSky360 / SmartLITE network management system (NMS). Its terminals are used for civilian IoT applications such as agriculture, fleet management, and critical infrastructure, as well as defense communications. In November 2026, media reports cited claims that Ukrainian forces had begun equipping long-range drones with hiSky SmartLITE terminals due to the Russo-Ukrainian war, though Ukrainian officials neither confirmed nor denied the reports.
