= Guy Dejouany =

- Born: 15 December 1920; Paris, France
- Died: November 14, 2011 (aged 90)
- Occupation: Business executive
- Spouse: Véronique Honoré
- Children: 3
- Parent(s): André Dejouany; Jean Imbart

Guy Dejouany (15 December 1920 – 14 November 2011) was the CEO of Compagnie Générale des Eaux, a French company (currently known as Vivendi) and part of France's CAC 40, from 1976 to 1995.

A graduate of the École Polytechnique and the École Nationale des Ponts et Chaussées, he succeeded George Huvelin at Compagnie Générale des Eaux, and was also chief executive officer of Vinci PLC from 1990 to 1996. He was the honorary chairman of Vivendi Universal. He played an important role in Vinci PLC's supervisory board as chairman from 1988 to 1990. He was the director of Vivendi Universal Publishing, and served as a member of the supervisory boards of Dalkia and Compagnie des Eaux et de l'Ozone. He was a permanent representative of Vivendi Universal on the board of directors of UGC, as well as the part-owner and director of Alcatel-Lucent. He was also a member of the councils D E monitoring of Dalkia and of the Ozone and Water-company.

== Biography ==
Dejouany was born in Paris on 15 December 1920, the only child of Jean (née Imbart) and André Dejouany, a French civil servant who had major assignments in French colonial administration in Algeria, Madagascar, and Senegal.

=== Presidency of C.G.E. ===
During his presidency of C.G.E, Dejouany transformed the company from a national firm focused on the water business to an international conglomerate.

In 1983 he prevented the nationalization of the Générale des Eaux when Jacques Delors, Minister of industry, had sought to buy it back via Saint-Gobain. Dejouany effort to achieve a blocking minority, were, with the aid of French President François Mitterrand's intervention in favor of the C.G.E., successful.

In 1984, the company invested in the audio-visual sector with Havas by creating Canal +. Later in the company created SFR, the first French private telephone operator. C.G.E. moved into civil engineering and construction through Campenon Bernard SGE (Société Générale d'Entreprises), as well as collection and treatment of waste and passenger transport. Positions in complementary trades, including heating, electricity, and heat production, were reinforced. New services were introduced (babysitting, green spaces, disinfection, parking lots). C.G.E.'s General Health quickly became France's number one private hospital.

By the mid-1990s C.G.E. became one of the largest holdings in the world, with over 2300 integrated companies.

Jean-Marie Messier succeeded Dejouany, and through his modernization the conglomerate came by 2002 to include several world leaders in their respective fields: VINCI, Veolia Environnement, Vivendi.

=== Personal life ===
Dejouany married Véronique Honoré, who died in 1985 They had three children, Capucine, Melchior, and Gonzague.

== Decorations ==
- Commandeur de l'Ordre de la Légion d'honneur
- Commandeur de l'Ordre de Saint-Charles
- Awarded from the Order of Leopold
