= J2M =

J2M may refer to:

- Mitsubishi J2M, Raiden (Thunderbolt), Allied reporting name "Jack," a World War II-era fighter aircraft
- Movement 2 June, a former West German militant group based in West Berlin
- Jean-Marie Messier, the former CEO of Vivendi
