= Spacenet =

Spacenet, Inc.
- Company type: Subsidiary
- Fate: Acquired by SageNet
- Headquarters: McLean, Virginia, U.S.
- Area served: North America
- Key people: Daryl Woodard (CEO)
- Services: Wireline/Wireless Connectivity Options, Satellite Connectivity - Ka and Ku, Integrated Network Appliance – Prysm
- Parent: SageNet
- Website: Spacenet.com

Acquired by SageNet in 2014, Spacenet, Inc. was a provider of VSAT satellite-based data network services as well as hybrid satellite/terrestrial networks and network management services. Spacenet was headquartered in Tysons Corner, Virginia in the United States.

Spacenet's primary business was providing VSAT and hybrid/terrestrial data network services to government and enterprise customers under the Connexstar brand. Spacenet's enterprise/government VSAT services are used for a wide range of applications such as primary broadband or narrowband networks, disaster recovery/backup networks and multicast file delivery. Beginning in 2006, it partnered with Cisco Systems as the service provider for the Cisco IP VSAT Satellite Network WAN Module in the United States. It held around 25% market share in the enterprise VSAT marketplace, according to the Comsys 2005 industry study. As of 2007, Spacenet equipment and services were in use at about 100,000 enterprise, government, residential and small office sites.

== History ==
The company was founded in 1981 as Southern Pacific Communications Corporation (SPCC), a sister company to Sprint, providing satellite links for voice connections. The company was acquired by GTE in 1983 and grew into a worldwide satellite operator and services provider (including launching the first North American K_{u} band satellite, Spacenet 1). It went through several acquisitions over the next 15 years, absorbing AT&T Tridom and Contel ASC.

GTE Spacenet was sold to General Electric American Communications in 1994. AT&T sold the Tridom Corporation to Spacenet in 1997.

In 1998, GE Americom sold Spacenet's North American operations to VSAT terminal manufacturer Gilat Satellite Networks for $227.5 million in stock and spun the satellite assets off into GE Americom (which later became part of SES).

In March 2005, Gilat wholly acquired StarBand, the first two-way consumer satellite ISP in the United States, and merged StarBand's operations into Spacenet.

Andreas Georghiou became CEO of Spacenet the following year, in 2006. Under Georghiou, Spacenet acquired Chantilly, Virginia-based managed network services provider CICAT Networks in 2011.

In 2012, president and chief operating officer Glenn Katz became CEO of Spacenet, replacing Andreas Georghiou.

Following a loss of $2 million on $77 million in revenues in 2012 and faced with uncertainty about future spending by the U.S. Department of Defense, Gilat Satellite Networks sold Spacenet Inc. to Tulsa, Oklahoma-based managed network solutions provider SageNet for $16 million in 2013.

SageNet CEO Daryl Woodard replaced Glenn Katz as CEO of the new combined company in 2014, with Brad Wise becoming president. Spacenet was wholly absorbed into SageNet by the end of 2014 and became solely a brand name for SageNet's satellite services.

== Satellite fleet ==
Satellite	Manufacturer	Launch date	Launch vehicle	Status	comments
Spacenet 1	RCA Astro	May 23, 1984	Ariane 1 (L9)	Inactive	Also known as ZX-5 and Chinasat 5
Spacenet 2	RCA Astro	November 10, 1984	Ariane 3 (V11)	Inactive	Also known as ZX-5 and Chinasat 5R
Spacenet 3	RCA Astro	September 12, 1985	Ariane 3 (V15)	-	Failed
Spacenet 3R	RCA Astro	March 11, 1988	Ariane 3 (V21)	Inactive	
Spacenet 4	RCA Astro/GE Astro	April 13, 1991	Delta 7125	Inactive	Previously AmerSat 2 e ASC-2
