= Country code second-level domain =

A country code second-level domain is a second-level domain to a country code top-level domain. Such a domain may be reserved by a domain name registry for the registration of third-level domains, or assigned to a third party as a subdomain.

Many country code domain registries implement domain name classes at the second level underneath their ccTLD, such as are present in the original generic top-level domains com, net, and org, which were intended for commercial entities, network operators, and non-profit organizations, respectively.

Many countries implement additional classes. For example, the United Kingdom (.uk) uses co.uk for commercial purposes and ac.uk for academic registrants. Brazil (.br) has a high number of predefined second-level domains, 140 as of 2021; they range from com.br for commercial activities and vet.br for veterinarians to wiki.br for wikis (see .br § Second-level domains).

== See also ==
- Domain Name System
- Private sub-domain registry
- Public Suffix List
