= Infobel =

Data intelligence company

Infobel S.A.
- Founded: July 1995; 31 years ago
- Headquarters: Belgium, Brussels
- CEO: Antoine Bruyns
- Managing director: Didier Baclin
- Industry: Data Services; Business Directory
- Products: B2B Data [375M+ businesses] POI Data [172M+ places] B2C Data [209M+ consumers]
- Services: B2B / SaaS data enrichment Corporate ownership & hierarchy database Consumer identity data Location intelligence Company verification & KYB; Structured B2B datasets for AI, analytics, and marketing platforms Addressing use cases such as sales & marketing automation, regulatory compliance and risk management, AI agents and AI-native tools and location intelligence.
- Employees: 20-50
- Parent: Datasharp (since 2025)
- Website: www.infobel.com www.infobelpro.com
- Launched: July 1995
- Current status: Active

Infobel (Infobel S.A.) is a Brussels-based data intelligence company originally founded in 1995 as one of the first online international telephone directories.

Over the years, the company evolved into a global provider of business-to-business and location intelligence data. Through its platform, Infobel has developed one of the largest existing databases of verified business profiles and points of interest, serving businesses of all sizes across use cases such as marketing, sales, compliance, and location intelligence. Clients include global firms like Google, Apple, TomTom, Shopify, and Trulioo. In 2025, the company was acquired by Datasharp, a holding led by Antoine Bruyns (chief executive officer) and Didier Baclin (chief technology officer), with investment support from Strada Partners. Under the new leadership, Infobel is scaling internationally and expanding its role in the global data ecosystem.

== History ==
Infobel began in 1995 when Marc Wahba and Alain Wahba, along with Michaël Wellner, launched a CD-ROM- telephone directory under their parent company Kapitol Trading, after a discontinued pitch to Belgacom. A legal challenge by Belgacom was dismissed the same year, paving the way for Kapitol to convert the directory into an online platform. By late July 1995, Infobel became one of the world's first international telephone directory websites, quickly expanding to cover over 50 countries within its first year.

In 2000, Infobel partnered with Maporama SA to integrate cartographic features into its platform. Following restructuring after the dot-com bust, Infobel pivoted toward serving as a database and search engine aimed at business verification and business-to-business use cases. In 2002, Kapitol acquired the Belgian and Dutch operations of Scoot Europe, a subsidiary of Vivendi Universal; by this time, Infobel’s directory listings spanned over 187 countries and were available in six languages.

The company continued to modernize through the 2000s; in 2008, it integrated its listing data into MMC's Poynt navigation application. A mobile app followed in 2012, underscoring Infobel's commitment to evolving digital channels.

By the early 2020s, Infobel had transformed into a global data intelligence provider. Its flagship platform, InfobelPRO, delivers enriched datasets across business entities, consumer identities, and point of interest data - supporting applications in marketing, compliance, and geospatial intelligence. Clients include Google, Apple, TomTom, Shopify, and Trulioo.

In 2025, Infobel was acquired by Datasharp a holding company led by entrepreneurs Antoine Bruyns (chief executive officer) and Didier Baclin (chief technology officer) - with strategic support from the investment firm Strada Partners]. The acquisition marked a new phase of growth and international scaling under the new leadership.
