= List of internet service providers in Brazil =

This is a list of internet service providers (ISPs) operating in Brazil.

== ISPs in Brazil ==
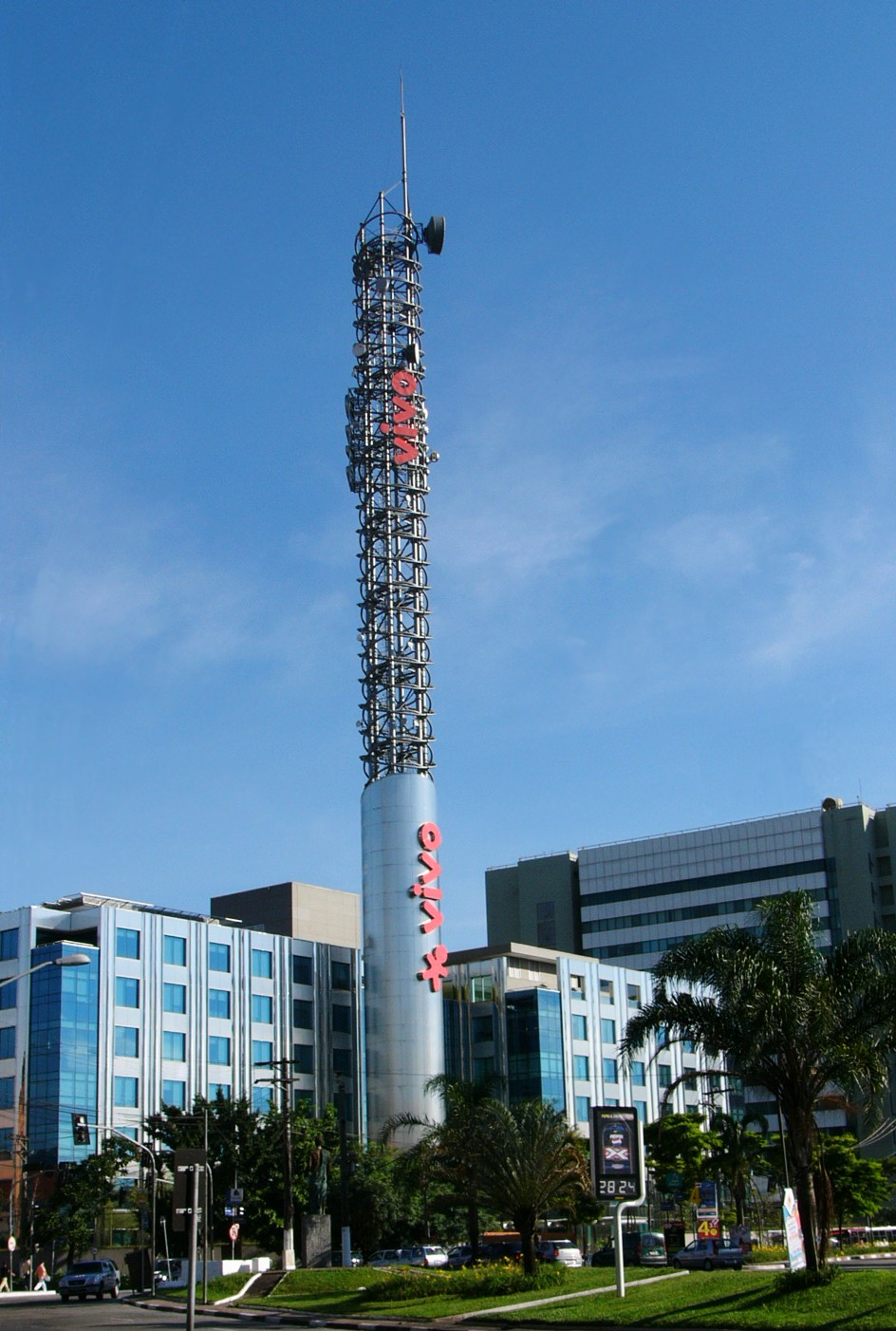
Vivo headquarters in São Paulo

=== Government ===
- Plano Nacional de Banda Larga (National Broadband Plan)
- Telebrás

=== Private ===
- Claro Americas
  - Embratel
  - Claro (América Móbil)
- Algar Telecom
- Internet Group (iG)
- Oi
- TIM Brasil
  - Intelig Telecom
- UOL
- Telefônica Brasil
  - Terra
  - Vivo Fibra
  - GVT

==== Regional ====
Many smaller ISPs are in operation, serving small and medium cities which otherwise would not be profitable for the larger companies. Often, their service is restricted to small areas. For example, these two companies serve only the state of Paraná:

- Sercomtel
- Copel

== See also ==
- Brazilian Internet phenomenon
- Telecommunications in Brazil
