= Brazilian Internet Steering Committee =

Brazilian government agency for the Internet

- Comitê Gestor da Internet no Brasil
- CGI.br's logo

Agency overview
- Formed: September 3, 2003; 22 years ago
- Jurisdiction: Brazil
- Headquarters: São Paulo, São Paulo state
- Child agencies: NIC.br; Registro.br; Cert.br; Cetic.br; Ceptro.br; Ceweb.br; IX.br
- Website: cgi.br

The Brazilian Internet Steering Committee (Portuguese: Comitê Gestor da Internet no Brasil; CGI.br) is a Brazilian government agency, first proposed in May 1995 by the then Ministry of Communication and the Ministry of Science and Technology (currently Ministry of Science, Technology, Innovation and Communication), and officially created on 3 September 2003. It is a multi-stakeholder organization with members from the government, the corporate sector, the third sector and the academic community.

The purpose of the agency is to promote technical quality, innovation and the dissemination of Internet services in Brazil.

== See also ==
- Brazilian Civil Rights Framework for the Internet
- NIC.br
- Registro.br and .br
- IX.br, the Brazilian internet exchange point system operated by CGI.br
