= Luiza que está no Canadá =

2012 Brazilian meme

Luiza que está no Canadá ("Luiza, who is in Canada") is a Brazilian Internet meme that arose from a television advertisement for a residential building in João Pessoa, Paraíba, the Boulevard Saint Germain, aired in January 2012. In the ad, Geraldo Rabello invites the family to talk about the development, "except Luiza, who is in Canada". The phrase soon became popular on Twitter and Facebook, quickly becoming one of the most talked about topics on the social networks. The phrase was quoted by celebrities and companies, and inspired the creation of a game.

Luiza returned to Brazil on January 17, expressing her anxiety and nerves. Subsequently, she filmed a new commercial to replace the previous one. Following this, an official government network sparked controversy by quoting the meme in a joke. Years later, Luiza expressed a preference for anonymity, despite her success benefiting her father. Shortly after the incident, she took on roles related to the meme's origin and pursued studies in dentistry.

"Luiza, who is in Canada" was considered the first meme of 2012 and entered several lists of best memes in Brazil.

== Origin ==
As of January 11, 2012, (Note: Other sources mention the 3rd of January (see reference 1).) a thirty-second television ad, about the luxury real estate development Boulevard Saint Germain, by Construtora Água Azul, of the Conserpa Group, began airing in Paraíba. In the advertisement, edited by publicist Alberto Arcela, Geraldo Rabello invites his wife and two children to comment on the condominium, and says, "That's why I made a point of gathering my family, except Luiza, who is in Canada, to recommend this development." At the time, Luiza Rabello was a 17 years old exchange student in Canada. In the video, she is represented in photos on the picture frames. According to Geraldo, since the Rabello family was well known in Paraíba, viewers would notice the absence of the teenager, causing the producers of the commercial to add such statement.

I didn't talk with the expectation of it going viral, I went with the script that was sent to me.

— Geraldo, in a 2020 interview

== Initial repercussion and response ==
The information about Luiza being in Canada was considered completely unnecessary in the ad, making it popular on the Internet. Shortly after the airing of the ad, it became the most talked about subject on Twitter, topping the national Trending Topics with the hashtag #LuizaEstanoCanada and becoming popular with several montages on Facebook and YouTube. A Tumblr page was also created specifically for the meme. The meme was quoted by the singer Lenine, who commented before starting a performance: "How wonderful, everyone is here, boy. Only Luiza is not here, because she is in Canada." The phrase was used in songs and parodies of scenes from movies or other famous videos. Companies have also quoted the meme. Decolar launched the promotion "How about a visit to Luiza who is in Canada?" and Claro quoted: "Everybody is participating in the Desafio Claro. Except for Luiza, who is in Canada." Other companies that quoted the meme were Pontofrio, CVC, and Magazine Luiza. The meme inspired the creation of the online game Luiza no Canadá.

For Bom Dia Brasil, Geraldo said that the initial repercussion was negative, but that was soon reversed. He also commented: "There is already a radio station from Canada wanting to find Luiza by any means because the Canadian government is after her." After the video went viral, Geraldo confirmed that Luiza had already received proposals from several companies to star in television commercials. He later commented that he decided to anticipate the daughter's return to Brazil, which was originally going to take place on the 29th: "This is an avalanche, the family got together and thought it was better to anticipate her return to Brazil. She will arrive in the country later this week and needs to be supported by her family at this time. I couldn't imagine that a simple commercial could have all these repercussions. We just want to be on her side." In response, users created a Facebook event to celebrate Luiza's return, and almost 8,000 people confirmed their "presence", and the number soon grew to 12,000. Luiza, who was in Canada, replied, "It's very strange, but I'm taking everything in jest. People I had never seen in my life, that I had never talked to in my life, talking and me not understanding why." The impact on the company was also positive, helping to sell eight apartments worth about 700,000 reais in just over a week.

== Aftermath ==
=== Return to Brazil ===
Luiza returned to Brazil on the 17th and was confined for two days in a hotel in the Ibirapuera region; she stated that she hadn't come back yet so as not to cause a commotion. She commented: "[...] if I told you that I was coming back, it would be more turmoil than it already is, which neither I nor my parents wanted." She was relatively nervous about coming back and anxious about the repercussion of the advertisement; "[it] was pretty impactful." Luiza declared that she found out that it was popular on the Internet through Facebook and two friends who showed her the meme, causing her to get scared and consider deleting her Twitter account. According to a publication on the 19th, Luiza had not yet been recognized on the streets or at the hotel. After her return, Luiza starred in her own ad, replacing the previous one starring Geraldo. Luiza also participated in Jornal Hoje, Encontro com Fátima Bernardes and Esquenta!

==== Repercussion after the return ====
After Luiza's return, the Presidency's press profile, via Twitter, published a joke with the meme: "With Luiza's return, who's going to Canada is Serra..." a fake news story mentioning that José Serra, from the Brazilian Social Democracy Party, would go to Canada after giving up his bid to run for the São Paulo mayoralty. Later, the profile published a public apology. The employee posted on the wrong account - he wanted to post on his personal profile. The profile was the fourth most accessed in the country, after the publication. Later, Serra stated: "I accept the apology for what happened on Twitter. The author recognized the mistake and there is no reason to fire him. End of conversation."

Journalist Carlos Nascimento, anchor of Jornal do SBT, used the opening of the January 19, 2012 edition to criticize the engagement around the meme, saying that he did not believe it was possible that "two such futile issues can draw the attention of an entire country." (Note: The other news mentioned was the alleged rape case that happened during Big Brother Brazil 12, which had been reported on Globo TV for a little more than a week.) The final sentence of the commentary had wide repercussions on social networks: "Luiza has already returned from Canada and we have been more intelligent." When asked about the statement, Geraldo said, "I respect him as a professional, but we can't take everything seriously. There have to be jokes too. I think he was on a bad day."

=== Luiza's life ===
In an interview for UOL in 2017, Luiza said that, despite profiting from the meme's success, her father "managed everything." She says that the success helped her father, who was going through a "difficult phase in his career." After the commercial was aired, Luiza also accepted jobs that had to do with the origin of the meme, mentioning, for example, that she did jobs involving exchange programs and websites. She commented, laughing: "Everything came up, from participating in a music video to being the advertising girl of a butcher shop. What do I have to do with a butcher shop?" Luiza won a short time later a course in London, from an exchange school, staying there for 40 days with her brother. When she returned, already less popular, she passed the entrance exam for dentistry. During the 2016 vacation, she stayed for 20 days in Canada. In 2017, when this interview was published, Luiza was in her penultimate semester of college.

Being anonymous is much better. I couldn't take all this exposure anymore. It wasn't a bad phase, it was different, but I always worked for this to have a beginning, middle, and end. There was never this desire to be famous, an actress, a presenter. The phrase is more famous than my image. I was more talked about than seen, I wasn't even in advertising. Everybody remembers the meme. If there is not this connection, I go unnoticed.

— Luiza in an interview for UOL in 2017

In July 2020, Luiza had already graduated and revealed that she was about to get married: "I practice my profession with a lot of love." On May 31, 2021, Luiza announced that she had married the businessman David Lira. According to news reports at the time, Luiza has her own dental practice in João Pessoa and was acting on the front line against COVID-19, doing tests at health posts.

=== Legacy ===
"Luiza que está no Canadá" is considered the first meme of the year 2012. It appeared in lists of best memes of the year by Super and Techtudo, and appeared retrospectively in the lists "25 memes that formed the character of the Brazilian internet" by Tecmundo, "Ten memes that were successful in the beginning of social networks" by Techtudo, "10 YouTube videos that became national phenomena" by GZH, and "national webcelebrities that fell into oblivion" by O Povo. The meme is quoted in the book Os 198 Maiores Memes Brasileiros que Você Respeita, by Kleyson Barbosa.

== See also ==
- Sanduíche-iche
- Senhora?
