= Senhora? =

Brazilian meme

Senhora? (lit. 'Ma'am?') is a Brazilian Internet meme that arose from an interview Edinair Maria dos Santos Moraes gave TV Anhanguera in 2015. Edinair, along with other servers of the Legislative Assembly of Goiás (Alego), was caught clocking into work and leaving soon afterward for three days. The reporter Renata Costa questioned the servant about this, who started running, being followed by the reporter who said, "Ma'am? Ma'am?".

The interview was broadcast on September 28, 2015, and soon became popular on the Internet, inspiring mobile games and entering several best memes of the year lists, besides being the most searched term on Google in this category. After the case, Edinair was exonerated and left Goiânia, and Alego made changes to avoid cases like this. In retrospect, cases of people running away from interviews were compared to Edinair's.

== Origin ==
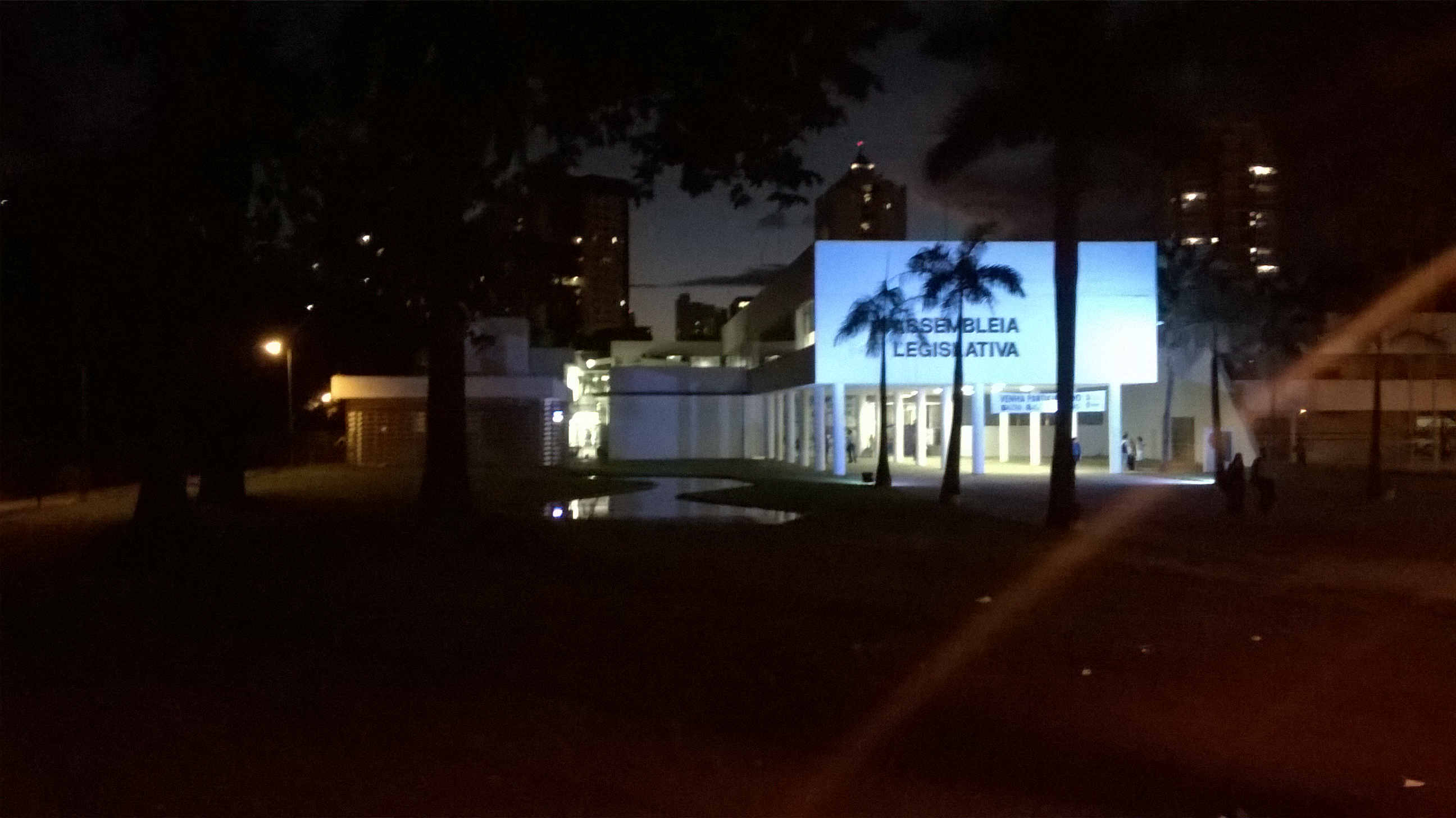
Front view of the Goiás Legislative Assembly building at night, in 2015

On September 28, 2015, the report Assembly Servers clock in and out without working was released, recorded by TV Anhanguera of Goiânia, one of the affiliates of TV Globo in Goiás. The programm caught employees of the Legislative Assembly of Goiás (Alego) clocking in and clocking out and leaving immediately afterward. Despite this, they were still receiving salaries of up to ten thousand reais (approximately two thousand dollars). One of the servers was Edinair Maria dos Santos Moraes, advisor level 3, who was caught recording attendance at the Alego but leaving soon after. This was registered for three days by the TV network. With a salary of two thousand reais, she was registered as an aide to deputy Marlúcio Pereira da Silva.

On one of the days, Edinair went to a bakery, for a walk in a park, and spent almost two hours sitting on a bench. Soon after, she returned to the Assembly but stayed outside. After this, she was interviewed by the TV Anhanguera news team and questioned by reporter Renata Costa. Edinair said she worked as a secretary, but was unemployed at that moment. She stated that she was at the Assembly to attend an event. However, she was questioned about the fact that she clocked in and out every day. She denied it, but the reporter says, "You did, we have it on tape." The servant started to run, being followed by the reporter, saying: "Ma'am? Ma'am? Why are you running if you are not an employee of the Assembly?". However, she got no response.

== Repercussion and legacy ==
The case soon became an Internet meme and started being shared on social networks such as Twitter. Several newspapers noted the meme's popularity. It was shared by journalist Hugo Gloss and Father Fábio de Melo, having considerable repercussions. The interview inspired mobile games, notably Senhora Volta Aqui. In memes, "Senhora" was the most searched term on Google in 2015, according to a report published on December 17. The case made it onto the lists of best memes of 2015 by Glamour Magazine, Super, Tecmundo, Mundo Bit and Diário de Pernambuco, and made it onto 33Giga's list of "greatest memes of the decade" and MegaCurioso's "7 greatest classic news stories that became memes", as well as "25 memes that formed the character of the Brazilian internet". The meme is quoted in the book Os 198 Maiores Memes Brasileiros que Você Respeita, by Kleyson Barbosa.

Later cases of people who fled interviews would be compared to Edinair's. On January 7, 2018, the TV program Fantástico aired a similar report, about doctors in the countryside of São Paulo who clocked in at the hospital where they worked and then left, returning only to clock out. The reporter tried to talk to one of these doctors. She asked: "Why haven't you done your full shift here, doctor?", and the doctor answered: "You will have to excuse me", and started to run. The reporter followed him to the hospital entrance and got no answer. The case also became a meme. Federal Congressman Eduardo Bolsonaro, on October 22, 2019, after a brief comment about the São Paulo Forum, avoided the press by running through three annexes of the Chamber, bumping into people. A reporter asked for an interview but was ignored. Eduardo stopped running after going down the stairs to Annex 4. The case was also compared to Edinair's and became popular on the Internet.

=== Aftermath ===
Marlúcio Pereira stated that there was nothing irregular regarding the employee, who provided social assistance services to the office. He said that Edinair's work was mainly in Aparecida de Goiânia. However, Edinair was exonerated one day after the report was published, on September 29, 2015. The legislative assembly's president Hélio de Souza stated, "We exonerated her because she said she didn't work in the Assembly. So, that was the criterion."

After the case, Edinair left Goiânia, allegedly because she was afraid of being assaulted. The defense reported that there was evidence that she was fulfilling her function as an advisor, but a "serious misunderstanding" caused her to be exonerated and become a meme. According to Edinair's lawyer, Maurício Vieira de Carvalho Filho, days after the case: "She is emotionally finished, completely shaken, it had a very big repercussion. There were several montages, and several fake profiles on social networks illegally using her name and image. She is in no condition to do anything today." After the flagrant of servers who were not working, as in the case of Edinair, the direction of Alego announced changes, such as the implementation of a biometric system, replacing cards, and a new scheme of entry and exit of servers, as well as a quarterly evaluation of employees prepared and delivered by each manager.

== See also ==
- Sanduíche-iche
- Luiza que está no Canadá
