= StarBand =

Satellite broadband Internet service

StarBand was a two-way satellite broadband Internet service available in the U.S. from 2000–2015.

StarBand ceased operations effective September 30, 2015 citing increased competition from other internet providers.

The StarBand satellite Internet system was a VSAT platform that used K_{u} band satellites for transmission of data from users' PCs to the StarBand network operations center. Two-way bandwidth for residential users was up to 1.5 Mbit/s download speed and 256 kbit/s upload speed, with unlimited usage and online hours. A 0.75 meter satellite dish is needed; the antenna was sufficiently small that homeowner associations could not prohibit its installation.

== History ==
StarBand Communications Inc. was initially a joint venture between Gilat Satellite Networks, EchoStar and Microsoft, and the StarBand service launched in 2000. StarBand Communications filed for Chapter 11 bankruptcy in 2002 and emerged from bankruptcy in 2003. In March 2005, StarBand Communications was wholly acquired by Spacenet, a division of Gilat Satellite Networks, which continued to operate the service. As of mid-2005, StarBand had approximately 32,000 subscribers.

StarBand announced in August 2015 that they would cease operations on 30 September 2015, citing competitive pressures from other current satellite internet providers, as well as new higher-bandwidth providers (Starlink and OneWeb) on the horizon, with new constellations slated to come online before 2020.

== Technology ==
StarBand offered the first residential two-way satellite Internet service in the United States market. Launched in November 2000, StarBand began selling the Gilat Satellite Networks SkyBlaster PCI card VSAT. Initially, the only way to purchase the StarBand system was to purchase a PC with the send/receive adapter card pre-installed as well as hosting software.

In 2001, StarBand began offering service using standalone VSAT units using the StarBand Model 180 (based on the Gilat Skystar Advantage/180 VSAT) connected via USB. The 180 modem was marketed as Windows OS-only because it required specialized Windows drivers for the USB interface; however, the modem had a built-in Ethernet port (covered by a plate) which was used unofficially by many users to connect directly to home routers or for use with non-Windows PCs.

In 2002, StarBand switched to Gilat's Model 360 VSAT, which enabled higher speed and allowed USB or Ethernet connections, but still required driver software to communicate.

In 2003, StarBand introduced the Model 480 modem (based on the Gilat Skystar 360E VSAT), which connected via Ethernet, supported multiple computers/OSes and required no additional software. The 48x series service supported Microsoft Windows PC, Macintosh, Unix and Linux computers. In late 2005, StarBand began selling only Model 480-based services.

In October 2006, StarBand introduced its next-generation service, the StarBand Nova (based on the Gilat SkyEdge series). The StarBand Nova modems were capable of higher speeds, optimized for VoIP, VPN, and worked on a more efficient hub. The SkyEdge modems had one Ethernet port and did not require hosting software for any OS platform.

Initially, StarBand supplied a .76M convergence antenna, which picked up two Dish Network signals and the satellite internet signal. StarBand later supplied a third generation .78M antenna, which required a separate antenna to receive satellite television signals. The third generation antenna provided a longer focal length, which helped to create a better signal-to-noise ratio.

All satellite internet providers such as StarBand measure the amount of data you transfer. Starband had six plans ranging from 500 kbit/s down to 1500 kbit/s down with weekly download limits of 750 Mbytes to 4,000 Mbytes.
