= IX.br =

Internet exchange point system of Brazil

- Location: Brazil
- Website: ix.br

IX.br is the Internet exchange point system of Brazil. It is a project of the government agency Comitê Gestor da Internet no Brasil (Brazilian Internet Steering Committee, CGI.br), and operates as a non-profit funded by NIC.br.

IX.br is an interconnection of metropolitan area network IXPs (called PIXes in Brazil) with commercial and academic networks, under centralized management. IX.br has 36 Internet exchange points in Brazil, as of January 2024. The aggregated traffic over its 39 locations has peaked over 31 Tb/s in 2023, making it the largest IXP aggregator in the world.

The most important IXP points are located in São Paulo with a traffic peak over 22 Tbit/s, and Fortaleza and Rio de Janeiro at around 4 Tbit/s each. The São Paulo point is the largest in the world, both by traffic volume and number of participants, with more than 2400 ASNs in late 2024.

== Locations ==
- Aracaju
- Belém
- Belo Horizonte
- Boa Vista
- Brasília
- Campina Grande
- Campinas
- Campo Grande
- Caruaru
- Cascavel
- Caxias do Sul
- Cuiabá
- Curitiba
- Feira de Santana
- Florianópolis
- Fortaleza
- Foz do Iguaçu
- Goiânia
- João Pessoa
- Lajeado
- Londrina
- Maceió
- Manaus
- Maringá
- Natal
- Palmas
- Porto Alegre
- Porto Velho
- Recife
- Rio Branco
- Rio de Janeiro
- Salvador
- Santa Maria
- São José dos Campos
- São José do Rio Preto
- São Luis
- São Paulo
- Teresina
- Vitória

== See also ==
- List of Internet exchange points
