= TIM Brasil =

Brazilian telecommunications company

TIM Brasil Serviços e Participações S.A.

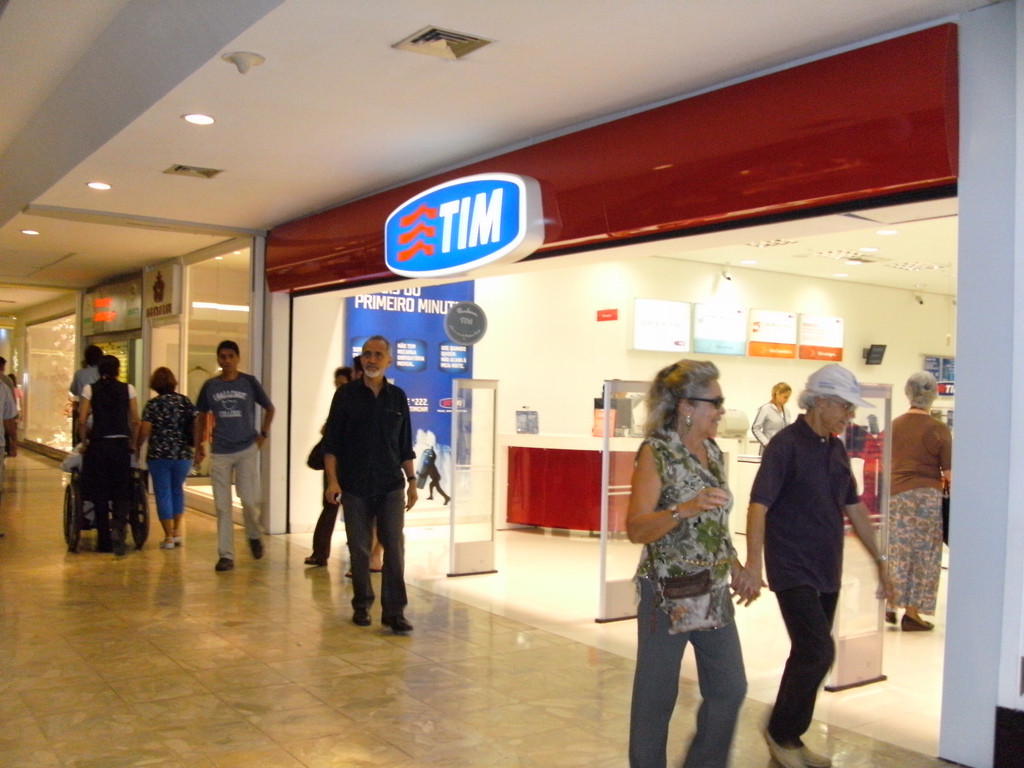
- TIM Brasil shop
- Company type: Public
- Traded as: B3: TIMP3; NYSE: TIMB (ADS)
- Industry: Telecommunications
- Founded: July 15, 1995; 30 years ago
- Founder: Telecom Italia
- Headquarters: Rio de Janeiro, Brazil
- Area served: Brazil
- Key people: Manoel Horácio Francisco da Silva (chairman); Rodrigo Modesto de Abreu (CEO)
- Products: Mobile and fixed telephony
- Owner: Telecom Italia Finance (99.9999%); TIM (0.0001%)
- Number of employees: 9,519 (2017)
- Parent: TIM
- Website: www.tim.com.br

TIM Brasil Serviços e Participações S.A., commonly known as TIM Brasil, is a Brazilian telecommunications company, subsidiary of TIM S.p.A., which provides mobile and fixed telephony services.

TIM Brasil was founded in 1995 and started commercial operations in 1998. Since 2002, has consolidated its national presence, becoming the first mobile phone operator present in all Brazilian States and, as of April 2017, has over 61.3 million customers.

The company, through the GSM technology, has a national reach of approximately 93% of urban population and offers services to mobile and fixed telephony, data transmission, and Internet access at high speed.

TIM Brasil is headquartered in Rio de Janeiro and is listed in B3 and NYSE, in São Paulo and New York City, respectively.

In 2009 TIM Brasil acquired Intelig Telecom. The process led to the merger of Intelig into TIM.

On May 5, 2012, TIM's chairman Luca Luciani resigned from all of his duties at TIM both in Brazil and Italy. There were charges, concerning scams, about the activation of SIM cards for deceased and non-existing customers.

== Products and services ==
TIM Live is a broadband Internet service provided in some areas of São Paulo and Rio de Janeiro, which uses the VDSL2 technology, currently in two speeds: 35 Mbit/s down (20 Mbit/s up) and 50 Mbit/s down (30 Mbit/s up).

TIM has announced investments up to R$ 100 million/year, within the R$ 3 billion available from the group investment plan. The acquisition from the AES Atimus network in the amount of R$ 1.5 billion allowed a great deal of this operation to be possible. The company is still studying the possibility of expanding this service to other cities.

== National fraud in Brazilian prepaid mobile lines ==
On 8 August 2012, TIM Brasil became involved in a scandal, due to a report release by the Brazilian National Telecommunications Agency (Anatel). The report pointed out that on TIM's prepaid voice plan (24.7% market share), called "Infinity" (in which the user pays roughly US$0.12 for each unlimited time call), calls were intentionally dropped by the company which forced customers to make (and pay for) new calls to continue talking. In just one day, 8.1 million calls were dropped and the total profit was approximately US$2 million.

Upon release of the report, the Public Ministry of the Paraná State filed a lawsuit against TIM asking that it stop selling new mobile lines in Brazil and pay a multimillion-dollar fine for the damages against consumers.

== Logo history ==
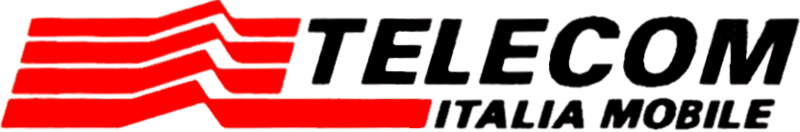
1990–1995

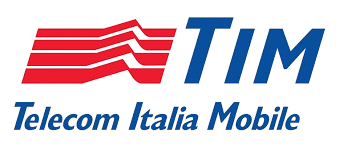
1995–1998

1999–2004

2004–2016

2016–present

== See also ==
- Intelig Telecom
- List of internet service providers in Brazil
- Telecom Italia
- Telecom Italia Mobile
