= Gilat Satellite Networks =

Israeli public company

Gilat Satellite Networks Ltd.

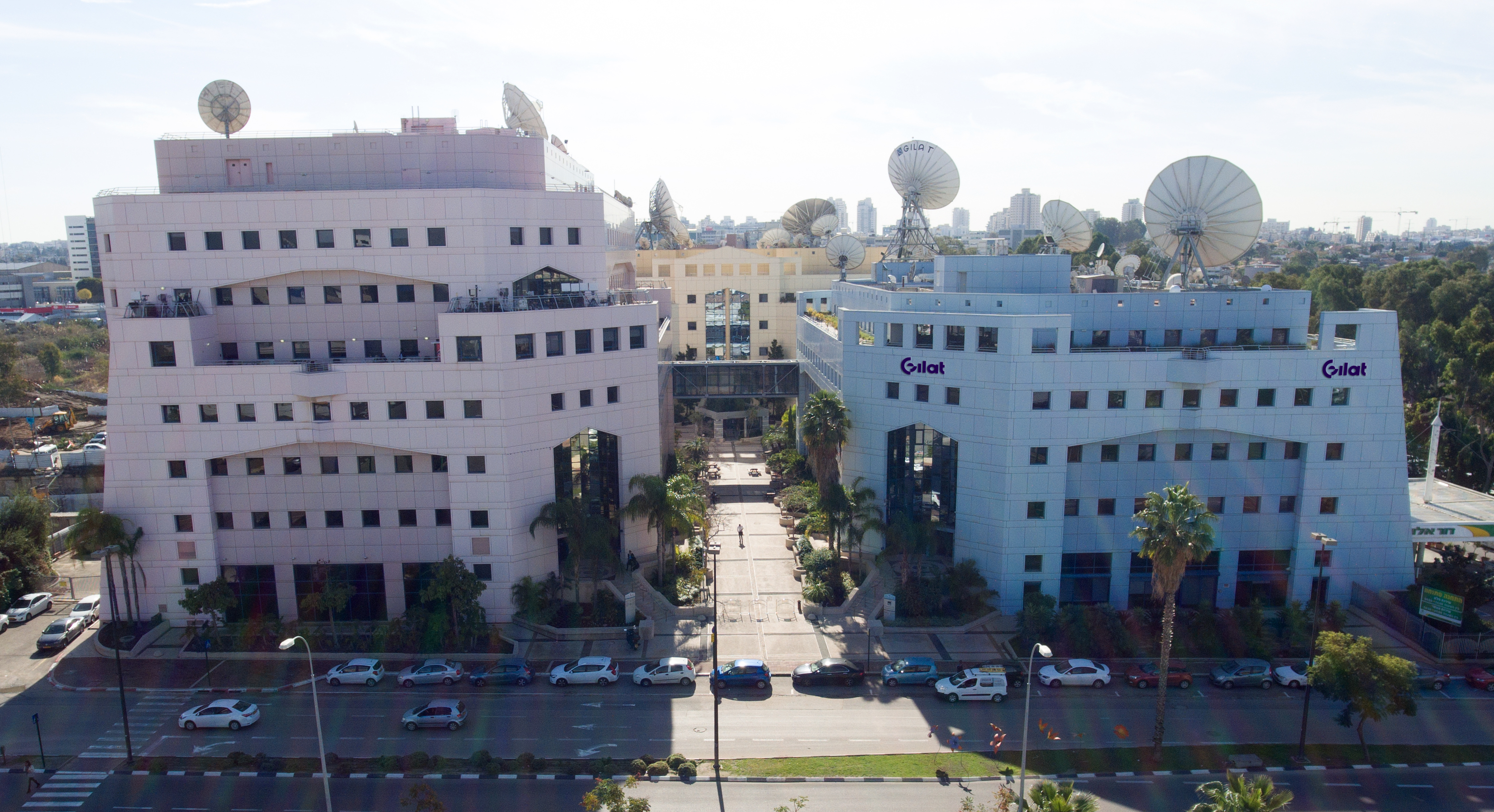
- Type: Public
- Traded as: Nasdaq: GILT, TASE: GILT
- Industry: Telecommunication
- Founded: 1987; 39 years ago
- Founder: Amiram Levinberg; Joshua Levinberg; Yoel Gat
- Headquarters: Petah Tikva, Israel
- Services: Satellite communication
- Revenue: ▲US$452 million (2025)
- Net income: ▼US$20.7 million (2025)
- Number of employees: 1,159 (2025)
- Subsidiaries: Wavestream Corporation, Gilat Networks Peru, Datapath Inc, Stellar Blu LLC
- Website: www.gilat.com

Gilat Satellite Networks Ltd. is an Israeli public company (Tel Aviv Stock Exchange: GILT; NASDAQ: GILT). It provides satellite-based broadband communications technology, its main expertise being the development, manufacture, and marketing of ground-based satellite systems for global communication via satellites.

== History ==
Gilat was founded in 1987 by Yoel Gat, Amiram and Yehoshua Levinberg, Shlomo Tirosh and Gideon Kaplan. All, apart from Kaplan, met during their military service, and were partners in a confidential project which granted them the Israel Defense Prize. At a later time they assisted cable companies established at the time. In its early days, Gilat struggled to compete with larger and better-established companies like EchoStar.

The objective of the company's founders was to develop products for the civilian market, and the opportunity came when USA Spacenet, which operated a network of satellites for data communications, hired their services to design a Very Small Aperture Terminal (VSAT), a tiny base station for two-way data communication. Spacenet asked Gilat to develop a small and relatively inexpensive solution. When the development was completed, they set out to demonstrate it to the company and although it operated successfully, Spacenet initially decided not to purchase the product, which brought the necessity to raise external funding to continue the operation. Gilat received its first external funding from the only venture capital fund operating in Israel at the time, the Athena Fund and the Discount Investment Company.

In 1991, Gilat launched VSAT, which it sold to Rite Aid Corporation, an American drugstore chain that operated 2700 branches throughout the United States. In 1993, it went public on NASDAQ and raised $28 million. In 1994, it launched the Faraway system for satellite telephony services to remote locations. In 1997, it launched the Dial Away system. In 1998, Gilat executives acquired Spacenet for the amount of $225 million through share-for-share exchange. Following the transaction, General Electric held 30% of Gilat's shares, becoming the largest shareholder in the company, most of which were sold within a few years at a large profit.

In 1998, Gilat was involved in founding Global Village Telecom (GVT), a company that built a satellite-based phone network for remote locations in South America using the VSAT technology that was developed by Gilat. During 1998 and 1999 GVT won tenders to build rural phone networks in Colombia, Chile and Peru.

In January 1999, Gilat filed a prospectus with the U.S. Securities and Exchange Commission (SEC) for an issue of shares with a financial value of approximately $275 million - The largest capital ever raised by an Israeli company on Wall Street up to that time. This was Gilat's fourth financing round on Wall Street to date, and the total capital it raised at this time reached $400 million. The company concluded the year with $338 million revenues.

In February 2000, at the peak of the dot-com bubble, it was valued at nearly $4 billion. Year 2000 demonstrated a record revenues of $504.6 million, an increase of 49% from 1999.

In 2000, Gilat introduced an innovation involving VSAT technology allowing remote locations, such as the Havasupai Reservation in Arizona and rural communities in Brazil, to access the internet at high speeds. In February 2000, Gilat and Microsoft announced that they are co-developing a two-way satellite broadband service for consumer purposes. The satellite service delivered Internet connections at speeds of up to 1.5 Mbps and did not require a second telephone line. A new company, Gilat-To-Home, was established to deliver the broadband two-way satellite service and Microsoft took an initial 26 percent stake in the company with an investment of US$50 million. In September 2000, Gilat-To-Home changed its name to StarBand Communications and received an investment of $50 million from EchoStar, who received an equity stake of 32 percent in StarBand.

In 2002, after the dot-com bubble burst, Gilat experienced a decline in revenue and the failure of StarBand (a huge project to establish a satellite network to provide two-way high-speed Internet services). Gilat accumulated a debt of about half a billion dollars (350 million to bondholders and 150 million to banks, mainly to Hapoalim Bank, and entered a debt settlement process.

In March 2003, after 16 years as CEO and chairman of the company, Yoel Gat retired, subsequent to the severe financial crisis the company found itself in and the creditors' settlement that followed. Amiram Levinberg, the company's president, also retired from the company's management, but continued to serve as a director. Oren Most, former Cellcom deputy CEO, was appointed CEO and president of Gilat, while Shlomo Rodav was appointed chairman. Oren Most left his position after 15 months.

In 2004, Gilat launched the first generation SkyEdge, system that provides broadband interactive data communication. In 2010, Gilat acquired Wavestream which designs and manufactures amplifiers for satellite networks, and in the same year acquired RAYSAT, which designs and manufactures antennas for satellite communications. In August 2013, Gilat sold Spacenet's services division to Sagenet.

In 2011, Gilat announced the creation of a new division, headed by Brigadier General (Res.) Moshe Tamir, expanding its presence in the U.S. defense market.

In 2015 and 2018, Gilat Peru signed several contracts with FITEL (now Pronatel) to establish a regional communications network in Peru for a total sum of $550 million. Gilat Peru continues to establish and operate networks in large areas of Peru. In 2016, Gilat launched a patent-protected solution for connecting cellular communication stations via satellite, which was the first of its kind for 4th generation networks, it later sold its cellular solutions to many companies such as Optus in Australia, T-Mobile in the United States, Softbank in Japan, TIM Brazil, EE in the UK, Telefonica Global and more. In 2016, the company was selected to provide satellite communication solutions for aircraft by the Gogo company (later acquired by the Intelsat)—this network currently provides satellite communications to over 2000 commercial aircraft worldwide.

In January 2020, it was agreed to sell the company to the American company Comtech Telecommunications, at a valuation of approximately $577 million. Prior to this transaction, 34.1% of Gilat's shares were held by FIMI Funds and 9.7% by Mivtach Shamir, but due to the Covid-19 pandemic, the transaction was canceled and Gilat was compensated by the company with $70 million distributed as dividends.

In 2022, Gilat launched the SkyEdge IV system, the first of its kind for satellites with very high capacity (VHTS). In 2023, the system began providing communications for SES using GEO and MEO technology. The same year, in December 2022, Gilat entered into a partnership with communications satellite giant Intelsat for the IS-E40 satellite. Gilat expanded the partnership agreement with Intelsat and began to provide it with satellite cellular transmission provides. At the same time, it expanded its strategic partnership with SES to operate the SES-17 satellite.

In March 2023, Gilat launched the Endurance product (high-power, high-performance, high-availability Solid State Power Amplifiers solution) through Wavestream and expanded its business activity with Hispasat, providing it with access to the SkyEdge IV platform, which interfaces with the Amazonas Nexus satellite. That same year, Gilat acquired DataPath, an American company engaged in providing satellite communications products to the US military market.

In July 2024, Gilat announced it had received over $9 million in orders from multiple satellite operators to expand their global SATCOM networks using Gilat's GEO and NGSO Satellite Communications Solutions products. These products provided in-flight connectivity, maritime mobility, cellular backhaul, and enterprise services.

== Strategic acquisitions ==
Company	Year	Price	Reference
Spacenet	1998	US$225 million	
StarBand	2005		
RaySat Antenna Systems	2010	US$25 million	
Wavestream	2010	US$130 million	
Datapath	2023	US $19.2 million (estimated)	
Stellar Blu Solutions	2025	US $107.8 million at closing, up to $99 million in contingent consideration	

In June 2026, Gilat announced an agreement to acquire most of Comtech Telecommunication's Satellite and Space segment for $157.5M, subject to closing conditions.

== Products ==
- SkyEdge, SkyEdge II and NetEdge
- MLT-1000 ruggedized spread-spectrum satellite modem

== Activity ==
Gilat Satellite Networks creates advanced technological solutions in the field of satellite communications and specializes in the development alongside the production of satellite-based communication systems. The company's activities are based on three complementary segments: the Satellite Networks Communications Division, which is responsible for developing, manufacturing and marketing satellite communication products, the Integrated Solutions Division, which includes Wavestream, and the Services Division, through which the company provides telephone and Internet infrastructure in remote areas by satellite communication. Based on innovative technology, the company operates through a cloud-based platform and satellite communications network terminals, which works in synergy with very high throughput satellites (VHTS), software-defined satellites (SDS) and multiple orbits; satellite on-the-move communication antennas, high-performance solid state amplifiers (SSPA) and Block Upconverters (BUCs). Gilat is active in many markets around the world.

Over the years, the company has provided more than 1,000,000 VSAT (Very Small Aperture Terminal), in more than 80 countries on 6 continents, including for military, government and enterprise systems.

The company's networks include a small satellite dish and network electronics and software, and are used by telephone companies, internet service providers and governments to provide communications infrastructure over a satellite. Gilat's technology provides a reliable Very Small Aperture Terminal (VSAT end-to-end) satellite connectivity, allowing connection when the alternatives are too expensive, limited, or non-existent.

Gilat's company headquarters are located in Israel. In addition, it has 16 local offices, seven development centers and three service centers worldwide.

=== Subsidiaries ===
Gilat's main subsidiaries are Gilat Peru S.A., Gilat Wavestream, Gilat Raysat and Data Path Inc. Over the years, Gilat Satellite Networks has established a number of subsidiaries as spin-offs or joint ventures in technological fields related to its areas of activity.

== Management ==
The current chairman of the board of directors is Amiram Boehm. The current CEO is Adi Sfadia. Former CEOs include Yoel Gat, Oren Most, Shlomo Rodav, Amiram Levinberg, Erez Antebi, Dov Baharav, and Yona Ovadia.

== See also ==
- TA BlueTech Index
- List of Israeli companies quoted on the Nasdaq
- Board of directors: chief executive officer Meir Shamir
