= Sanduíche-iche =

One of the first Brazilian memes

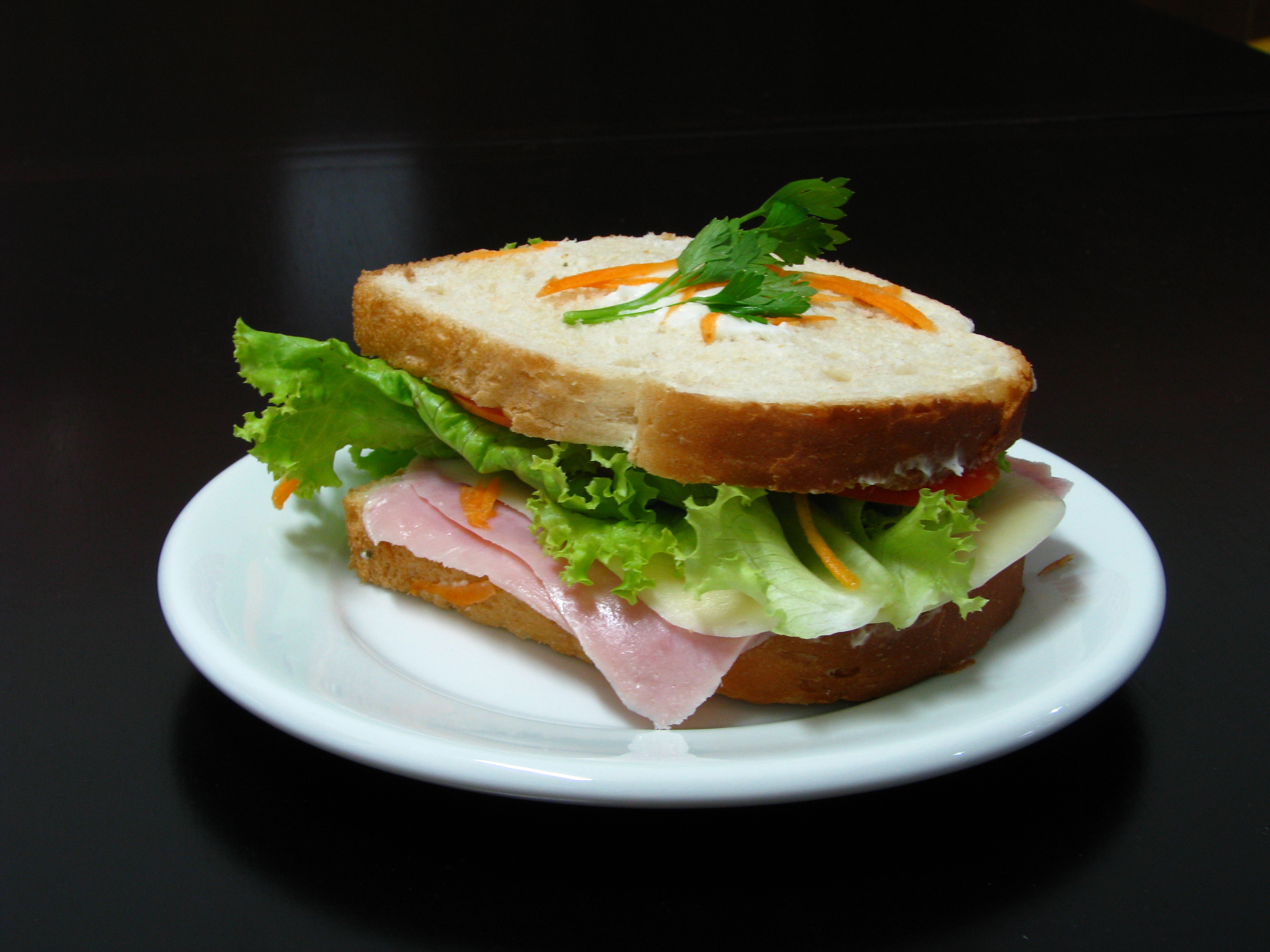
Typical Brazilian sandwich.

Sanduíche-iche is an Internet meme that emerged in Brazil from an interview with nutritionist Ruth Lemos on TV Globo Nordeste in 2004. In it, Lemos stutters, saying the word "sanduíche-iche" ("sandwich-wich"). The video went viral in 2005 through the social network Orkut communities and was shown on the television program Pânico na TV. Lemos initially didn't like the repercussion, but, taking advantage of the visibility, she ran for state deputy. This is considered one of the first memes in Brazil.

== Origin ==
External videos
- Original interview

On August 26, 2004, nutritionist Ruth Lemos gave a live interview on TV Globo Nordeste's Bom Dia PE about the eating habits of children. While speaking, she stuttered and said, among other stuttered phrases, "They need to know-know that even the sandwich-wich can have a nutritional value." Lemos is not a stutterer; the sound return delay caused her to repeat "because she thought she couldn't hear". She had never used an earpiece. Despite this, and laughing during the interview due to the situation, she managed to finish, "turning herself into an involuntary comic character", according to Folha de S.Paulo. In the second part of the program, when she returned to air she spoke normally.

== Popularity ==
Initially, the interview was forgotten, but it became popular in 2005. The video went viral on YouTube, a new platform at the time. By March 23, 2005, there were 48 communities dedicated to the nutritionist on Orkut. E-characters were created and a website dedicated to the episode received 175,000 visitors. Yahoo! showed that "Ruth Lemos" was the third most popular subject in the first week of March 2005, with a 586% increase in searches for the term. Lemos also became an MSN Messenger emoticon and was the subject of musical parodies.In addition, the interview was shown on Pânico na TV.

[...] someone - and nobody knows who - decided to record the scene on his computer and send it by e-mail to a friend, who must have sent it to other friends and thus started one of the most impressive chains of dissemination that the Brazilian web has ever seen [...].

— Fred Figueirôa, to Pernambuco.com

On April 8, the press office of Intelig Telecom's advertising agency declared that Lemos would be the company's poster girl. In the advertisement, she is interviewed and talks about the operator's area code offers, stuttering: "You need to know-know, that to make an area-code call you need to get out of the routine-ine-ine-ine and dial 23-23[...]." In June 2008, the fake Twitter profile @ruth_lemos was created, which posted comical phrases imitating Lemos' supposed stuttering. In 2011, the meme was part of a Kuat soda campaign.

== Repercussion ==
Lemos learned about the repercussion when her colleague called her and told her that the interview had been shown on Pânico, which she found "not pleasant". Initially, she said in an interview with Globo Online in March 2005 that she talked to lawyers in an attempt to "curb the mania". Years later, however, she gave more positive answers and said that she didn't expect this response from the public: "I was very surprised because I didn't expect it at all, I am a discreet person and suddenly it was a very big exposure. One does not understand much." She only watched the interview on Programa do Jô; she explained, "It's not even that I was ashamed, but I thought that wasn't good for me. So why watch it?"

Lemos tried to use her fame to launch a candidacy for state deputy for Pernambuco in 2006, but was not elected, receiving 1,160 votes. In the free electoral TV schedule, she was "firm and serious", contrasting the idea of the stuttering Internet interviewee. She believes that the meme harmed her: "It only causes prejudice, because it puts me in a situation of someone limited, without potential, without training. How was I going to take advantage of it? If it caused anything, it was harm." She said that she got "every single vote in person, door-to-door, talking to people", and that her "sudden fame" didn't help her. To Folha de S.Paulo, she said she didn't know if the video hurt her or helped her because, "at the same time that it made me known, it ridiculed me a little". To Extra, she said, "I had more than a thousand votes and, for a person who wasn't in the media and had no resources, that's a lot. But for the repercussion of the case, I should have had many more votes, right? I would have been elected if the video had a positive connotation."

In interviews from 2014 and 2015, she said she still gets approached on the street because of the meme. She has already been president of the Pernambuco Nutrition Association and a member of the Federal Council of Nutritionists for two consecutive terms and, according to an Ego publication in 2016, she is a teacher, works at a hospital, and is a representative on the Food Safety Council.

== Legacy ==
Sanduíche-iche is considered one of Brazil's first memes and, according to UOL, "one of the oldest viral videos on the Brazilian Internet". On November 25, 2007, Hiro Kozaka, of the blog Videorama, told Folha de S.Paulo that Sanduíche-iche was a YouTube classic. In another article, the same newspaper stated "Perhaps no one has become a celebrity so quickly and widely in Brazil, thanks to a meme, as nutritionist Ruth Lemos". The meme was placed in several lists, such as Veja São Paulo's "Great TV gaffes", R10's "some of the best Brazilian memes", MundoBit's "classic YouTube videos", "most beloved YouTube videos" from 33Giga, "most famous memes from the net" from GZH, "10 YouTube videos that became national phenomena" from NSC Total, "7 internet classics" from Pernambuco from PorAqui, "7 greatest reportage classics that became memes" from MegaCurioso, as well as in the list of "25 memes that formed the character of the Brazilian internet" from the same site, "10 hit YouTube videos" from Exame, "national webcelebrities who fell into oblivion" by O Povo, "20 most beloved YouTube viral" by Super, "greatest memes in the history of the Internet" by TechTudo and in the list of "best memes in the history of Brazil" by Metrópoles. The meme is quoted in the book Os 198 Maiores Memes Brasileiros que Você Respeita, by Kleyson Barbosa.

== See also ==
- Senhora?
- Luiza que está no Canadá
