= Jean-Marie Messier =

French businessman (born 1956)

- Born: 13 December 1956 (age 69); Grenoble, France
- Education: École Polytechnique; École nationale d'administration
- Occupation: Businessman
- Spouses: Antoinette Fleisch (m. 1982; div. 2005); Christel Delaval (m. 2012)
- Children: 5

Jean-Marie Messier (French pronunciation: [ʒɑ̃ maʁi mesje]; born 13 December 1956) is a French businessman who was chairman and chief executive of the multinational media conglomerate Vivendi (formerly Vivendi Universal) until 2002. He is also frequently referred to by nicknames such as "J2M" and "J6M", but most notably as “ The Man who Tried to Buy the World” which was coined by Jo Johnson in his biography of Messier reflecting on corporate greed and monopolizing the industry. (Note: One variant being "J6M" which stands for "Jean-Marie Messier Moi-Même-Maître-du-Monde" (Jean-Marie Messier, Myself Master of the World), an alliterative reference to his alleged great power during his time as chairman of Vivendi, coined by satirical show Les Guignols de l'info (which airs on French television channel Canal+, owned by Vivendi).)

== Early life and education ==
Jean-Marie Messier was born in Grenoble, France, the son of an accountant.

He studied at the École Polytechnique from 1976 to 1980, and then at the École nationale d'administration between 1980 and 1982. He was refused sponsorship by Total to study at Harvard Business School.

== Business career ==
Messier held several posts at the French Economy Ministry, including a post as technical counselor for privatization under Édouard Balladur, during the 1980s, before moving to investment bank Lazard Frères in 1989. He established the boutique bank Messier Partners.

After taking up the chairmanship of the utility company Compagnie Générale des Eaux in 1994, he oversaw its diversification into the media sector and its 2000 merger with Groupe Canal+ and Seagram (owners of Universal Studios) to form Vivendi Universal.

=== Forced resignation ===
Messier was forced to resign from his position with Vivendi in July 2002, after the company posted a non-cash loss of 13.6 billion euro ($US 11.8 billion) during 2001. During his time as CEO of Vivendi, Messier used corporate funds to buy a $17.5 million apartment for his personal use at 515 Park Avenue at 60th Street in New York City, the swank Arthur Zeckendorf development that was home to Senator Jon Corzine for a time. After he was fired, Messier tried to claim the apartment as part of his severance package, but was rebuffed. However, he did receive 23.4 million dollars in severance from his former employer, Vivendi. Messier then relocated to New York City to work as a business consultant.

== Prosecution and conviction ==
Messier was put on trial in France in 2011 and was found guilty of misappropriation of company funds and divulging misleading information when he headed Vivendi. He appealed the decision, and in 2014 the court overturned Messier's conviction on charges of misleading investors but upheld the conviction on charges of misuse of corporate funds.

== Personal life ==
Messier married Antoinette Fleisch in 1982, with whom he has five children; they separated in 2005. In 2012, he remarried Christel Delaval.

Messier published an autobiography titled j6m.com in 2020, and another two years later called My True Diary, which is about his time at Vivendi.
