= Gooey (software) =

Internet chat service

Gooey was an Internet chat application launched in 1999. The system allowed people who were browsing the same web site at the same time to communicate with each other in a separate window. It was developed by Israeli software company Hypernix, which in 2000 was acquired by SIGA.
