= Global Village Telecom =

Defunct Brazilian telecommunications company

GVT (Holding) S.A.
- Type: Subsidiary of Telefónica, parent company in Telefónica in Brazil
- Industry: Telecommunications
- Founded: 2000
- Defunct: April 15, 2016
- Fate: Merged into the Vivo
- Headquarters: Curitiba, Brazil
- Key people: Amos Genish, (CEO)
- Revenue: ▲US$ 2.0 billion (2012)
- Net income: ▲US$ 878.4 million (2012)
- Number of employees: 17,000
- Website: Official website

Global Village Telecom (GVT) was a Brazilian telecommunications company that offers services on landline telephone, broadband for both consumer and business, Pay TV and voice over IP and belongs to Telefónica, through Telefônica Brasil. GVT has been in the market since the end of 2000. GVT today operates under the Vivo brand.

== History ==
Global Village Telecom was founded in April 1998 by a group of Israeli investors led by entrepreneur Joshua Levinberg, who previously founded Gilat Satellite Networks. Their idea was to build a satellite-based phone network for remote locations in South America using the VSAT technology that was developed by Gilat Satellite Networks. The initial investors in the company included: Magnum Technologies Fund, which held 55% of the company, US investment bank Merrill Lynch held 20%, Clal Information Technologies 10%, Discount Investment Corporation 10%, and Gilat Satellite Networks 5%.

During 1998 and 1999 GVT won tenders to build rural phone networks in Colombia, Chile and Peru.

=== Brazil Fixed-line Telecommunications Licence ===
In 1999 GVT was awarded a 20 years license to provide fixed-line telecommunications services in Brazil's south and central regions. As part of Brazil's government plan to introduce competition in three fixed-line regions of the country. When it privatized the state telecommunications company, Telebras, in 1998, the government divided Brazil into three regions for fixed-line telephony. Each region was to have one newcomer and an incumbent. In each case, the incumbent was a former unit of Telebras, which was privatized.

The region for which GVT won the license had a population of 38 million people at the time and encompasses nine states, including the country's capital, Brasilia. GVT plan was to invest US$550 million over three years and to build a network with 500,000 lines. GVT was to compete in the region against the former Telebras unit Tele Centro Sul, which was owned by a consortium led by Telecom Italia.

In 2001, GVT was split between Gilat Satellite Networks and the other investors in the company. Gilat took over the Colombia and Peru operations and GVT remained solely focused on the Brazilian market.

=== Initial public offering ===
In 2007, GVT had an initial public offering on the Brazilian Stock Market, achieving a market cap of $1.2 billion and raising $480 million.

=== Sale to Vivendi and then to Telefónica ===
The French company Vivendi bought a 58% stake of the company by the end of 2009, and raised its participation to 99.17% the following year.

On August 30, 2014, Vivendi announces the sale of GVT to Telefónica for 7.5 billion GBP, and so GVT becomes a brand of Telefônica Brasil.

=== End of the GVT brand and merger with Vivo ===
In 2015, with the purchase of GVT, Telefónica (through Telefônica Brasil) announced that the GVT brand would cease to exist as of 15 April 2016, starting to use the Vivo brand, thus becoming a single company.

=== Acquisition closure ===
On May 29, 2015, Telefónica acquired GVT from Vivendi for a total cash settlement and debt assumption of €4.663 billion, alongside a 12% equity stake in the newly integrated Telefônica Brasil. The transaction had previously received regulatory clearance in the first quarter of 2015 from the Brazilian antitrust agency, the Administrative Council for Economic Defense (CADE), and the telecommunications regulator, Anatel.

== Products and services ==
GVT is a company that offers high-speed broadband across its area of operation, pay TV with paid high-definition channels, as well as integrated and convergent advanced landline telephony.

The company offers broadband internet connection through ADSL, ADSL2 +, VDSL2 and FTTH technologies. It offers content and Internet services through the online portal POP, besides VoIP services through VONO to residential and micro-enterprise customers in Brazil (also usable outside the country). In 2012, the company also started to offer Pay TV packages.

GVT offers internet speeds of 15 Mbit/s, 25 Mbit/s, 35 Mbit/s, 50 Mbit/s and 150 Mbit/s, to all the 149 cities it serves, except in Erechim e Montenegro (Rio Grande do Sul); Paranaguá (Paraná); Porto Velho (Rondônia); Palmas, e Rio Branco (Acre), where speeds up to 20 Mbit/s are supported.

Strategically, GVT built a network prepared for the convergence of voice, data and image, enabling it to offer higher than market average speeds since the beginning of its operation in 2000. Currently, circa 70% of annual company investment is dedicated to expansion and improvement of the network.

The average Internet speed of GVT customer base reached 13.2 Mbit/s in October 2013. The index is greater than the average speed of Brazilian Internet (2.4 Mbit/s) and countries with large technology development as South Korea (13.3 Mbit/s) and USA (8.6 Mbit/s) – source: Akamai Institute.

It is considered the best Brazilian broadband for five consecutive years (2009–2013) according to the open survey made with INFO Magazine readers and the best telecommunication company by Isto É Magazine in 2013. In addition, the company won the EXAME/IBRC Award for best customer service in the fixed telephony category.

GVT also serves the enterprise segment, providing products and services, offering integrated solutions and managed services including fixed-line telephony, unified communication systems, hosted VoIP, Internet services, private-data networks and Data Center services.

=== Coverage ===
Currently, GVT backbone covers 20 states: Acre, Alagoas, Bahia, Ceará, Espírito Santo, Goiás, Minas Gerais, Mato Grosso do Sul, Mato Grosso, Paraíba, Paraná, Pernambuco, Rondônia, Rio Grande do Norte, Sergipe, Tocantins, São Paulo and Rio de Janeiro, plus Distrito Federal (Brazil capital).

São Paulo

- São Paulo, Araraquara, Arujá, Bauru, Campinas, Guarulhos, Indaiatuba, Jundiaí, Mauá, Mogi das Cruzes, Osasco, Piracicaba, Santo André, Santos, São Bernardo do Campo, Ribeirão Preto, São Vicente, Sorocaba, Suzano, Várzea Paulista and Votorantim.

Minas Gerais

- Belo Horizonte, Betim, Contagem, Governador Valadares, Ipatinga, Coronel Fabriciano and Juiz de Fora.

Espírito Santo

- Vitória, Cariacica, Colatina, Linhares, Serra and Vila Velha.

Rio de Janeiro

- Rio de Janeiro, Campos dos Goytacazes, Duque de Caxias, Nilópolis, Niterói, Nova Iguaçu and São Gonçalo.

Mato Grosso

- Cuiabá, Várzea Grande and Rondonópolis.

Goiás

- Goiânia, Anápolis, Aparecida de Goiânia, Cidade Ocidental, Luziânia, Rio Verde, Senador Canedo, Trindade and Valparaíso de Goiás.

Mato Grosso do Sul

- Campo Grande e Dourados.

Distrito Federal

- Brasília, Brazilândia, Cruzeiro, Paranoá, Planaltina, Samambaia, Santa Maria, São Sebastião, Sobradinho and Taguatinga. (Administrative regions of Federal District)

Alagoas

- Maceió.

Bahia

- Salvador, Alagoinhas, Camaçari, Feira de Santana, Lauro de Freitas and Simões Filho.

Ceará

- Fortaleza, Caucaia and Maracanaú.

Paraíba

- João Pessoa, Campina Grande and Santa Rita.

Pernambuco

- Recife, Camaragibe, Caruaru, Gravatá, Jaboatão dos Guararapes, Olinda, Paulista and Vitória de Santo Antão.

Rio Grande do Norte

- Natal.

Sergipe

- Aracaju.

Acre

- Rio Branco.

Rondônia

- Porto Velho.

Tocantins

- Palmas.

== GVT TV ==
GVT TV
- Founded: September 16, 2011
- Defunct: April 15, 2016
- Fate: Replaced by Vivo TV
- Headquarters: Curitiba, Brazil
- Parent: Telefónica, parent of Telefônica Brasil
- Website: Official website

GVT TV was a Brazilian satellite pay-TV operator subsidiary of Global Village Telecom, where its signal transmission was made in a hybrid way by IPTV and DTH (Direct to Home) systems by Ku Band.

It was founded on 16 September 2011 in a test version. In addition, GVT TV was created in order to fight for leadership in the pay TV market with major operators in Brazil such as Sky Brasil and Claro TV, both with the same technology used.

GVT TV stood out for being the first to make HDTV channels available in all its packages and provide interactive content such as Access to Social Networks (Facebook, Twitter and Instagram), weather forecast and much more, directly from its decoder device.

In December 2012, it consolidated itself as the fifth largest pay-TV operator in the market, and was also the operator that grew its subscriber base the most during the year, almost quadrupling its base.

In March 2013, it launched its BACKUPTV service. Through BACKUPTV, it is possible to continue watching the programming, even if there is a failure of the satellite signal reception, due to bad weather. In order to offer a better experience for customers, the operator created a kind of contingency when the satellite stops working by taking advantage of the Internet network.

In August 2013, along with the start of operations in the city of São Paulo, two new modalities of its pay TV service were launched, IPTV and DTH. With this, the operator started to offer three modes of pay TV: IPTV, for customers who contract fiber optic internet service. Hybrid (DTH + IPTV), for customers who contract the internet service through metallic cables (ADSL/VDSL) and DTH, for customers who contract only the pay TV service.

In October 2014, the company was acquired by Spain's Telefónica, owner of Vivo, for R$ 21.9 billion. The company's merger was approved by Anatel in January 2015 and by Cade in February of the same year, however, with restrictions.

On 15 June 2015, it was announced that GVT TV was acquired by Telefónica and now uses the Vivo TV brand.

On 15 April 2016, it was officially renamed Vivo TV.

== See also ==
- List of internet service providers in Brazil
- Telefônica Brasil
