= Telefônica Brasil =

Brazilian telecommunications company

Telefônica Brasil, S.A.
- Type: Public sociedade anônima
- Traded as: B3: VIVT3, VIVT4; NYSE: VIV; Ibovespa Component
- Industry: Telecommunications
- Predecessor: Telesp
- Founded: 1998
- Headquarters: São Paulo, Brazil
- Key people: Christian Gebara (CEO)
- Products: Fixed line, Mobile telecommunications, Internet services, Cable television
- Brands: Vivo
- Revenue: ▲US$ 11.1 billion (2018)
- Operating income: ▲US$ 2.3 billion (2018)
- Number of employees: 34,000
- Parent: Telefónica
- Subsidiaries: Terra; TGestiona
- Website: www.telefonica.com.br

Telefônica Brasil, trading as Vivo, is a Brazilian telecommunications group, subsidiary of Spanish Telefónica.

It was originally formed as part of Telebrás, the state-owned telecom monopoly at the time. In 1998, Telebrás was demerged and privatized. Telefónica bought Telesp, the São Paulo division, and rebranded it to Telefónica. The group has a participation of 15% in its revenues in the world and currently the company has more than 90 million customers.

In 2010, Telefónica acquired the shares of Vivo that belonged to Portugal Telecom, and transferred control of the company to Telefônica-Vivo, its subsidiary in Brazil. In 2012 the company's services began to be marketed under the Vivo brand, its services, such as internet access, cable and satellite television, fixed and mobile telecommunications, among others, were integrated in this brand, launched in 2003 for the Telefónica-Portugal Telecom mobile telecommunications joint venture.

== See also ==
- List of telecommunications companies in Brazil
- List of internet service providers in Brazil
