= Telephone numbers in Brazil =

- Country: Brazil
- Continent: South America
- Regulator: ANATEL
- Numbering plan type: Closed
- NSN length: 10 digits (landlines); 11 digits (mobiles)
- Format: AA NNNN-NNNN (landlines); AA 9NNNN-NNNN (mobile lines)
- Country code: 55
- International access: 00xx
- Long-distance: 0

The Brazilian telephone numbering plan uses a two-digit area code and eight-digit local phone numbers for landlines and nine digits for mobile lines. Public utility services use short phone numbers (usually three digits), always starting with 1.

== Local dialing ==
As established by ANATEL, the Brazilian federal telecommunications regulatory agency, the format for a local phone number is nnnn-nnnn (eight digits) for landlines, and nnnnn-nnnn (nine digits) for mobile lines. The first digits of the local number identify the service associated with the phone number:

- 100 to 199: special short public utility numbers (see below)
- 2000 to 5999: landlines
- 6000 to 8999: Unused (iDEN was disestablished in 2018)
- 91000 to 99999: mobile phones

0 is reserved for long-distance calls and cannot be used as a local initial digit (see below). 901 to 909 have been reserved for automated system of national collect calls (see below) since 1982 and cannot be used as local initial digits. 900 was used to premium-rate telephone numbers in the 1990s, but is not in use now.

Until the 1990s, there were also certain regions in São Paulo, Rio de Janeiro, Paraná, Santa Catarina and Rio Grande do Sul with three-digit area codes and five (n-nnnn) or six-digit (nn-nnnn) phone numbers. In the city of São Paulo, although the area code has two digits, there were still six-digit telephones in use; 3X-nnnn phone numbers (with X=4-7) changed to 60X-nnnn and then to 310X-nnnn, 9X-nnnn phone numbers (with X=2 or 3) changed to 69X-nnnn and then to 669X-nnnn (today 269X-nnnn), and 6n-nnnn phone numbers which were changed directly to the eight-digit format (nnnn-nnnn) at that time. Even shorter numbers used to exist in previous decades, especially in small towns and before direct distance dialing became universal.

In the late 1990s, the 7-digit landline numbers beginning with 9 in the area of DDD 11 also had their prefixes changed, and their numbers were replaced in most cases by prefixes beginning with 69 (now 29) or 64 (now 24) in the cities of São Paulo and Guarulhos respectively.

Landlines using prefixes beginning with 8 and 7 had their prefixes changed up to 2000 and 2001 respectively for 8-digit numbers, and new area codes 22, 28, 64, 66, 87, 88, 89, 93, 94, 97 and 99 are included at this time.

Until 2005, some localities still used seven-digit local numbers (nnn-nnnn), such numbers being changed to eight digits (nnnn-nnnn).

Except in the case of the states of São Paulo and Rio de Janeiro, the numbers of 7-digit landlines were given the number 3 preceding the old number, and the numbers of 7-digit mobile phones were given the number 9 preceding old number between late 90's until the inclusion of the ninth digit.

In the state of Rio de Janeiro, only the 7-digit numbers beginning with 3 and 8 received the 3 preceding the old number, while the other numbers received the number 2 preceding the old number.

In the country region and litoral of the state of São Paulo, in many cases the old prefix of 7-digit numbers have been completely changed, but this numbers standardized with an 8-digit number starting at 3 in landlines and 9 in mobiles until the inclusion of the ninth digit.

In the Greater São Paulo and neighborhood cities using DDD 11, the cities today uses numbers initializing with 2, 3, 4 or 5, with the prefixes started in 2 are used mainly in São Paulo and Guarulhos, started in 3 mainly in São Paulo and Osasco, started in 4 used mainly in the metropolitan region and started in 5 used exclusively in numbers allocated to the city of São Paulo except 57 numbers, allocated for rural landline numbers.

Numbers beginning with 8 are reserved for mobile phones and numbers beginning with 7 after change of prefixes started for this number in 2001 were initially reserved for trunking, however they were later also intended for mobile phones.

Until 2008, the initial digit 6 was used for landlines in some parts of São Paulo and neighbouring cities in area code 11, but Anatel required that 6 be released for mobile use. Fixed-line numbers starting with 6 in that area were gradually changed during 2008 to new prefixes starting with 2. In other areas of Brazil, the initial digit 6 was not in use at that time, so no change was necessary because at this time landlines used prefixes beginning with 2, 3 or 4 outside the Greater São Paulo region.

Exceptionally, at the beginning of the 2010s, cell phones with a prefix starting at 5 were enabled in Greater São Paulo, and in this transition period, which anticipated the inclusion of the ninth digit (9) preceding the old cell phone numbers, the telephony used intercept messages to indicate that calls to such numbers were being directed to mobile phone numbers.

Today, landline numbers usually use the number 3 at the beginning of the number. The use of the initial digit 2 is occasional except in Greater São Paulo and the state of Rio de Janeiro. The use of initial digit 4 is also occasional except in Greater São Paulo and digit 5 is only used in São Paulo and rural landlines using 57 prefix.

Numbers in the 300n and 400n format are commonly used by companies to provide customer service using local numbers. (see below)

Numbers starting with 1500 and 1700 are used by some Internet service providers (ISPs) to provide dial-up Internet access. Those ISPs have special pricing agreements with local landline operators and customers are charged less than the price of regular local calls when calling such dial-up access numbers.

Local directory assistance can be obtained by dialing 102, but the service is charged as a regular local call in most instances except from payphones. However, all local landline telephone companies offer on-line directory inquiries on their Web sites. Mobile lines are not available for inquiry, for privacy and security reasons.

== Mobile telephony ==
Mobile phone numbers in Brazil are assigned the same geographic area codes as fixed lines, according to the subscriber's place of residence or most frequent use. Until the inclusion of the ninth digit, mobile phone numbers start with the digits 6, 7, 8 or 9. These initial digits are known to the public, so one always knows beforehand if one is calling a fixed or a mobile line.

After replacing the landline numbers that started in 7 in 2001 (with 7 or 8-digits in Greater São Paulo and 7-digits in other regions), these numbers were initially reserved exclusively for radiophone use (iDEN technology), but soaring demand for new mobile numbers eventually forced unused number ranges starting with 7 to be released for general mobile use.

Historically, at the time mobile numbers had seven or eight digits, the higher ranges of the 9 initial digit (96–99) were originally assigned to the old state monopolies before the privatization of Brazil's telephony system, and later to their privatized direct successors. To create a competitive market, later the Brazilian government auctioned further mobile service licenses, filling the available number ranges backward – first with the lower ranges of 9 (91–95), then 8, and so on.

As a consequence, in the beginning 9 (today 99) was more commonly assigned to mobile operators that used older technologies such as AMPS (analog), TDMA and CDMA, while for some time 8 (today 98) was specifically reserved for all new GSM licenses. Now GSM is universally adopted by Brazilian mobile operators and, combined with number portability and the inclusion of a ninth digit to the left (see below), this distinction is no longer observed or meaningful.

Non-geographic prefixes 020, 060 and 070 (020n-nnn-nnnn, 060n-nnn-nnnn, 070n-nnn-nnnn) are reserved for future non-geographic mobile phone numbers.

=== Ninth digit for mobile numbers ===
Brazilian mobile phone numbers always have nine digits now, but seven digits were usual in the first years, then eight digits became the standard for several years. The last area code to convert fully from seven to eight digits was 61 (comprising the national capital city, Brasília, and neighbouring areas), in 2005.

However, the popularity of multiple-SIM mobile phones in Brazil makes the country have more active mobile lines than inhabitants (as of November 2016, 248 million vs. 206 million), and by 2010 the country's most populous and economically important area code, 11 of metropolitan São Paulo (an area where over 20 million people live), was getting close to exhausting its available mobile numbers. Overlays and extra area codes were considered, but deemed confusing and impractical for local conditions.

So, on 10 December 2010, ANATEL announced the inclusion of a ninth digit (in the format 9nnnn-nnnn) to mobile phone numbers used in the São Paulo metropolitan region (area code 11). This change was meant to increase the numbering capacity in metropolitan São Paulo from 44 million to 370 million, thereby eliminating the perennial shortage of available numbers in that area.

Telecom providers would have 24 months to implement the ability to dial a new digit to the left of all cell phone numbers of area code 11, but the measure ended up being implemented a few months ahead of that initial schedule, on 29 July 2012. On that date, the digit 9 was added to the left of all existing mobile numbers in the 11 area code, regardless of their former initial digits. So, for example, mobile number (11) 6010-2030 became (11) 96010-2030.

To standardize the mobile numbering plan in Brazil, ANATEL started gradually rolling out the change to nine digits in other area codes and states as well. The last three states to implement the ninth digit in mobile numbers (the Southern states of Paraná, Santa Catarina and Rio Grande do Sul, corresponding to area codes 41 through 55) did so on 6 November 2016. Initial digits 6 through 8 remain reserved for mobile lines, but as of September 2020 all mobile numbers in Brazil still start with 9 after the ninth digit was added, and it was not yet necessary to use the other reserved initial digits.

Landline numbers (starting with 2, 3, 4 or 5) and trunked radio mobile telephony (iDEN) numbers were not changed and remained with eight digits. As iDEN numbers had the same format as the former 8-digit regular mobile numbers, and some old 8-digit standard mobile numbers also used the initial digit 7 of iDEN numbers, some confusion happened for some time, with people adding an initial 9 when calling iDEN numbers, which would not allow the call to be placed. This is no longer a problem, as iDEN service was discontinued on 31 May 2018. On that date, users who still had iDEN phones had to replace them with standard phones with GSM/3G/4G network support, and the number with one in 9-digit format.

Despite this fact, mobile phones registered outside the 11–19 (São Paulo), 21, 22, 24 (Rio de Janeiro) and 27–28 (Espírito Santo) areas are usually displayed on WhatsApp (widely used by Brazilians to send text, voice and video messages due to the privileged access granted by mobile operators, in contrast to the assumption of network neutrality present in the Marco Civil da Internet) with the old 8-digit number.

== Public utility ==
The format for public utility service phone numbers is 1nn. It includes all emergency (as well as some non-emergency) services, such as:

- 100: Human Rights Secretariat
- 112: Universal emergency number for all GSM phones (redirects to 190)
- 128: Standard emergency number in Mercosul (in Brazil, redirects to 190)
- 136: Ministry of Health hotline
- 147: Digital television transition hotline (2010–2023)
- 153: Municipal Guards
- 181: Anonymous crime reporting (some areas only, others may use different, more miscellaneous numbers)
- 188: Centro de Valorização da Vida (suicide prevention helpline)
- 190: Military Police
- 191: Federal Highway Police
- 192: Ambulance
- 193: Firefighters
- 194: Federal Police Department
- 197: Civil Police
- 198: State Highway Patrol
- 199: Civil Defense
- 911: Emergency number in the United States (redirects to 190)

Most citizens only know the 190 (Military Police) number for emergencies, but 192 (ambulance), 193 (firefighters) and 199 (civil defense) are also commonly known. Usually a call to 190 (military police) describing an emergency with a non-criminal nature will be redirected to the proper number or provide assistance if they are qualified to (as in cases of choking children).

By law, 136 is printed on the packaging of all tobacco products sold in Brazil, so it is usually thought to be just a smoking cessation help hotline. That hotline does exist and can be accessed by this number, but 136 is actually a more comprehensive contact channel between citizens and the Ministry of Health.

In 2013, a law was approved that added two new numbers, 112 and 911, to mimic the emergency numbers from European countries and United States, respectively. A call to those numbers is redirected to the same lines as 190. The law was made because of the large number of foreign tourists expected for the 2014 FIFA World Cup and the 2016 Summer Olympics in Rio de Janeiro, so the redirecting numbers were initially reachable only from the 12 World Cup host cities, but later the change was extended to the entire country.

Some states and municipalities may have additional short 1nn public utility numbers for other services. For example, in many cities, such as São Paulo, one can get information, make requests and complaints about most services and issues with the municipal administration by dialing 156. Regional utilities for services such as electricity and water supply may also have short access numbers starting with 1. In contrast to emergency numbers, which are always toll-free, calls to such services may or may not be charged.

Landline telephone companies' customer service numbers have been normalized as 103, followed by a two-digit code. For example, Embratel customers contact the company's customer service dialing 103–21. For most mobile carriers, the number is 105, followed by a one-digit code (e.g., 105-2 for Claro). For cable and satellite television operators, the number is 106, followed by a two-digit code (e.g., 106-21 for Net and 106-11 for SKY Brasil).

== Long-distance dialing ==
The Brazilian system for long-distance dialing is relatively unusual and somewhat confusing, insofar as the choice of long-distance carrier determines the actual digit sequence to be dialed.

The standard format for writing down – but not for calling since 1999 – a long-distance phone number in Brazil is (aa) nnnn-nnnn, where aa is the area code and nnnn-nnnn is the local phone number. Due to persistence of old habits from the time when carrier codes were not used (see below), the format (0aa) nnnn-nnnn is still commonly seen, but this usage is discouraged, since it may confuse customers when actually calling, despite the mobile carriers give the option to complete the call with the old dialing (0aa) nnnn-nnnn with their own code in the configuration of the GSM/UMTS/HSPA/LTE SIM cards sold in the country. Area codes are distributed geographically. See the list of Brazilian area codes for a full list.

For billing purposes, calls from mobile telephones are considered local when destined to a number belonging to the area where the cell phone is operating, while in the case of fixed telephones, such area is divided into a series of subdivisions into local areas, where only calls destined to the same city or metropolitan area are billed as local.

For other calls from landlines and mobiles, it is necessary to use the provider selection code, known as CSP, a two-digit number where none of the digits can be zero and is generally limited to one number per provider. In such cases, it is usually necessary to dial a 0 followed by the CSP and area code before the phone number.

The need for carrier code placement began in 1999 for landlines and around 2004 for older TDMA/CDMA networks. In GSM networks, the use of the CSP was mandatory from the beginning and in the old iDEN networks and in some VOIP networks, the CSP is not used.

iDEN is discontinued, but in exceptional cases of VOIP networks that do not work with the CSP, dialing in the old mode (0 followed by the area code before the phone number) or in the international mode (+55 followed by the area code before the telephone number) is the applicable mode.

=== Carrier selection ===
To dial a long-distance number within Brazil, one needs to use a carrier selection code, to choose which long-distance carrier will be used. The carrier selection code is specified before the area code; so, to actually place a call, one should dial 0-xx-aa-nnnn-nnnn, where xx is the two-digit carrier selection code. Because of that, sometimes long-distance phone numbers are written down as (0xxaa) nnnn-nnnn, with two actual letters x as placeholders, which the caller will replace by a carrier code.

For example, to call the number 2345-6789 in Rio de Janeiro (area code 21) using the long-distance carrier TIM (selection code 41), one would dial 0 41 21 2345 6789.

The use of carrier selection codes can be very confusing, because of the obvious added complexity, the different rates charged by different carriers, and even which long-distance carriers can be used to place the call, since not all of them service the entire Brazilian territory, and some are only available from mobile or from VoIP lines. For example, Claro (selection code 21) is available from any telephone line in all of Brazil, but Sercomtel (code 43) only in Londrina and some neighbouring cities.

Some examples of carrier selection codes are:

- 12 Algar Telecom
- 14 Oi (formerly Brasil Telecom)
- 15 Vivo
- 21 Claro (formerly Embratel)
- 23 TIM (Formerly Intelig Telecom)
- 25 Vivo (Formerly GVT)
- 31 Oi (formerly Telemar)
- 41 TIM
- 43 Sercomtel

Area codes in Brazil are popularly known as "DDD codes" (códigos DDD) or simply "DDD", from the initials of "direct distance dialing" (discagem direta à distância in Portuguese). This was how the service was first advertised when it first appeared in the late 1960s, and the name stuck.

As of January 2009, Embratel is the only carrier offering operator-assisted long-distance calls, by dialing 0800-703-2110. Long-distance directory inquiries can be made dialing 0800-703-2100. However, subscriber numbers can also be obtained by a search at the destination telephone company's website. See the "External links" section below for a useful site with links to Brazilian directory assistance pages.

== Collect calls ==
In Brazil, collect calls are automated. The phone number to be called is prefixed with a special code. Then, as the person being called answers the telephone, they listen to a short standard recording informing them that it is a collect call. Next, the call is established and the caller is supposed to say their name and location within the next six seconds. If the person being called hangs up within those six initial seconds, nothing is charged. Otherwise, the remaining time of the call is charged to the recipient's phone line.

This used to cause problems with answering machines and faxes, but the switch to digital voice mailboxes operated by the telephone companies largely eliminated that problem. Also, the widespread use of caller ID combined with the easily recognizable electronic tune played before the collect-call warning makes many people hang up immediately if they hear the tune and the number has not been recognized.

Local collect calls are dialed with the 9090 prefix; so, to call nnnn-nnnn collect, one would dial 9090-nnnn-nnnn.

To collect calls for long-distance numbers, one should dial 9 before 0-xx-aa-nnnn-nnnn.

For example, to call the mobile number 98999-6666 registered in Ribeirão Preto region (area code 16) outside of this area using the long-distance carrier Vivo (selection code 15), one would dial 9 0 15 16 98999 6666.

International collect calls, for countries for which it is available, are not automated and must be placed through Embratel's international operator, dialing 0800-703-2111. One can also call an English-speaking AT&T operator directly by dialing 0800-890-0288.

== Non-geographic numbers ==
Non-geographic numbers usually have a three-digit prefix and a 7-digit number, preceded by the number 0 used for long-distance calls. The second digit of non-geographic number prefixes is the number 0. Some 0800 numbers are 6-digit only, being that such lines generally have high user traffic. Because of this fact, despite having activated a new 7-digit number, it still keeps the 6-digit number initially assigned active. For example, Ministry of Education has 0800-61-6161/0800-061-6161.

The currently allocated prefixes are:

- 0300: premium-rate telephone numbers initially with higher rates than local calls, but with lower rates than the long-distance calls of the basic plan, charged separately from the call package.
- 0303: Initially used for televoting, it had a fee similar to 0300. Today it is used for identifying telemarketing calls.
- 0304: Telephone numbers intended to identify collection centers.
- 0500: premium-rate telephone numbers for charity donations, with a maximum of R$ 30.00 per donation (the telephone number is assigned to a donation value) + R$ 0.50 for call costs.
- 0800: toll-free telephone numbers.
- 0801: Telecard – Call service where the charge for a call from a payphone was charged to the account of a landline subscriber traveling. Service commonly used in the 90s, but discontinued, although when dialing from payphones, the four digits of the password related to the telecard still appear hidden in the device after dialing the prefix and the two digits assigned to the operator with which the Telecard was related.
- 0900: premium-rate telephone numbers at rates much higher than those charged on national calls. After problems due to charges considered abusive by consumers in the 90s and early 2000s, the service is rarely used today.

Prefixes 020, 060 and 070 are reserved for future non-geographic mobile phone numbers.

=== "3/400n-nnnn" numbers ===
A special case of non-geographic numbers are eight-digit numbers in the form 3/400n-nnnn. They are dialed as local numbers, without any trunk, carrier or area codes, and calls to them are always charged as local, regardless of where the answering call center physically is. In spite of this, there are some 300x/400x prefixes that direct calls as locations only in a specific geographic area within the area of operation of the company operating the service, or may even be used as typical local numbers.

Such numbers differ from 0300 numbers in that the latter in the past were not charged as local calls and had their own rates (not always really flat and sometimes more like premium-rate numbers), which by law must be informed when advertising the number. 0300 numbers are often used, for example, by low-cost airlines' reservation systems, whereas 400n-nnnn numbers are used by large but cost-conscious companies that do not wish to bear the full cost of a nationwide toll-free system, yet still do not want their customers to be put away by having to pay long-distance rates, and the "national" number system in these cases is based on the same number being contracted in all DDD areas of the country or eventually only in the areas where the company has the focus of its activity.. 3/400n-nnnn numbers are also often used by ISPs for standard dial-up access.

As of January 2009, 3/400n-nnnn numbers are not yet available for access from all area codes or localities due to the division of the cities in the DDD areas into local subareas generally limited to the municipality or the conurbated metropolitan area, requiring the typing of 0-xx-aa to call the number from landlines in the municipalities outside the local subarea to which the number special is associated. As a result, these numbers are associated with state capitals and their metropolitan regions or the largest city in the area. The company (especially in the case of ISPs) may also specify localities where the service will or will not be available, providing an alternative long-distance or toll-free number for such cases. For example, the country's largest bank, Banco do Brasil, offers the number 4004-0001 for its clients to access its home banking services in major cities (where most clients are) paying local rates, and the toll-free number 0800-729-0001 for clients elsewhere in the country.

Example: In area 19 the prefix 4001 was located to Metropolitan Region of Campinas, therefore:

- To call the number (19) 4001-2234 from a landline in Vinhedo (part of the Metropolitan Region of Campinas): 4001 2234
- To call the number (19) 4001-3579 from a payphone in Piracicaba (within area 19, but outside the metropolitan region of Campinas): 0 XX 19 4001 3579
- To call the number (19) 4001-3456 from a cell phone working in Rio Claro (also outside the Metropolitan Region of Campinas, but also in area 19): 4001 3456

As explained, it is not necessary to dial the prefix 0-XX-AA from cell phones in the same area with which the destination number is associated, but it may be necessary to dial such prefix from landlines and payphones.

== International calls ==
=== Outbound ===
Outbound international calls use a 00 trunk prefix, followed by the carrier selection code (same as in domestic long-distance calls) and the international telephone number. So, to call the international telephone number cc-aa-nnnn-nnnn (where cc is the country code and aa the area code), one would dial 00-xx-cc-aa-nnnn-nnnn, where xx is the carrier selection code. Since international telephone numbers can have up to 15 digits, the maximum number of digits to be dialed is 19.

For example, to call the U.S. number 202-555-0123 in Washington, D.C. (area code 202), United States (country code 1), using TIM as the chosen carrier (selection code 41), one would dial 00 41 1 202 555 0123.

There is a special exception for foreign visitors who are using international roaming in Brazil. They can use the standard dialing format to call abroad from Brazil (+cc-aa-nnnn-nnnn).

As of August 2016, Embratel was the only carrier offering operator-assisted international calls, by dialing 0800-703-2111. International telephone number inquiries can be made dialing 0800-703-2100 (same number as for domestic directory inquiries). Embratel also offers radio calls to sea vessels in Brazilian waters by dialing 0800-701-2141, in addition to INMARSAT service, which works like any regular international call and can be placed through any major long-distance carrier.

=== Inbound ===
Inbound international calls use +55 aa nnnn nnnn as the international telephone number, where aa is the two-digit Brazilian area code and nnnn nnnn is the 8-digit local number (9 digits for mobile numbers). This must be preceded by an international call prefix specific to the country where the call is being placed from (e.g., 011 from the U.S. and Canada, 00 from most other countries, or the actual "+" sign from many mobile networks). If the number in Brazil was supplied with an initial 0 and/or carrier selection codes, those must be omitted.

For example, to call the number 3210-9876 in São Paulo (area code 11) from the United States, one would dial 011 55 11 3210 9876.

== Number portability ==
In September 2008, ANATEL started the use of number portability in Brazilian territory, but the existing rules of the numbering plan were kept. Fixed-line customers can keep their numbers when moving their address and/or when switching telephone companies within the same municipality, and mobile lines customers can keep their numbers provided they stay within the same local area (i.e., the portion of the area code where calls are charged as local).

== See also ==
- List of dialling codes in Brazil
