= Companhia Telefônica Brasileira =

Brazilian defunct company (1923-1976)

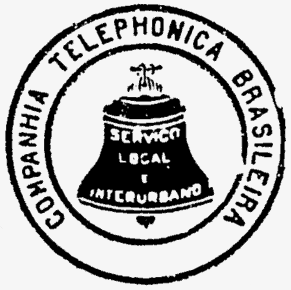
- Type: Telecommunications
- Predecessor: Rio de Janeiro & São Paulo Telephone Company
- Founded: November 28, 1923
- Defunct: February 22, 1976
- Successor: Telecomunicações do Rio de Janeiro (Telerj); Telecomunicações de São Paulo (Telesp)
- Headquarters: Rio de Janeiro, Rio de Janeiro; Brazil
- Owner: Brazilian Traction Light and Power Co. Ltd. (1923-1956); Brascan (1956-1966); Embratel (1966-1972); Telebras (1972-1976)

Companhia Telefônica Brasileira (CTB) was a Brazilian fixed-line telephone company that provided services to the states of Rio de Janeiro and São Paulo, as well as Minas Gerais and Espírito Santo through its subsidiaries CTMG and CTES. Between 1972 and 1976, CTB belonged to the Telebras system.

== Origin ==
=== Predecessors ===
==== Rio de Janeiro ====
On November 15, 1879, Pedro II granted Charles Paul Mackie, Bell Labs' representative in Rio de Janeiro, the first authorization in Brazil to operate telephone services through Decree No. 7,539. On April 17, 1881, the Telephone Company of Brazil was licensed to operate. By 1883, five stations with 1,000 subscribers each had been installed in Rio de Janeiro.

In the 1880s, several companies became involved in providing telephone services in Rio de Janeiro: Companhia União Telefônica do Brasil (1885), Empresa Obras Públicas do Brasil (1889), Companhia Telefônica Industrial (1890), Siemens & Halsk (1897) and Brasilianische Elektrizitäts Gesellschaft (1899); the latter was acquired in 1905 by the Canadian-owned Rio de Janeiro Tramway, Light and Power Company and was renamed Rio de Janeiro Telephone Company in 1907.

In 1897, the Central, Largo do Machado, São Clemente, Estácio de Sá, São Cristóvão, Engenho Novo, Andaraí and Santa Teresa stations, located in Rio de Janeiro, were closed after the cancellation of the contract with Companhia Telefônica Industrial, the firm responsible for operating the service. In February, a deal was signed with a German company, which provisionally installed a telephone exchange in the city until the Central Station was inaugurated on November 3, 1899, in a building on Tiradentes Square. On March 9, 1906, a fire destroyed the exchange's facilities, which reopened in September 1906. In 1910, the Interurban Telephone Company was created and began operating in Niterói and Petrópolis.

==== São Paulo ====
In 1883 the first telephone station was installed in Santos and had 75 subscribers. On January 5, 1884, the Empresa Telefônica Campineira, the first company in the state of São Paulo, was created in Campinas. On January 7, 1884, the Companhia Telégrafos Urbanos installed the first 22 telephones in the city of São Paulo. However, the firms did not possess exclusive rights to the services.

In 1891, the São Paulo and Santos lines, which belonged to the Companhia União Telefônica do Brasil, were transferred to the Companhia Telefônica do Estado de São Paulo, a firm that also acquired the Campinas lines in 1911. In 1896, the Rede Telefônica Bragantina, which lasted 15 years and served 98 cities in the states of São Paulo, Rio de Janeiro and Minas Gerais, was created in Bragança Paulista. By the end of 1916, the Companhia Telefônica do Estado de São Paulo had established six telephone stations in the city of São Paulo (Central, Brás, Bom Retiro, Cambuci, Água Branca and Cidade), one in Campinas and one in Santos.

==== Company unification ====
In 1912, the Canadian holding company Brazilian Traction Light and Power Company Ltd. was created. It controlled the São Paulo Tramway, Light and Power Company and the Rio de Janeiro Tramway, Light and Power Company in the energy sector, as well as the Rio de Janeiro Telephone Company in the telecommunications sector.

In 1914, the firm acquired the Interurban Telephone Company and, in 1916, became the manager of the Companhia Telefônica do Estado de São Paulo and the Rede Telefônica Bragantina through the Rio de Janeiro & São Paulo Telephone Company, authorized to operate by Decree No. 11,500 of February 23, 1915. It also merged the Companhia de Telefones Interestaduais, a telephone operator that worked in several cities in the states of Minas Gerais and Rio de Janeiro. In 1919, Companhia Telefônica do Estado de São Paulo and Rede Telefônica Bragantina were definitively incorporated.

=== Creation of CTB ===
On January 15, 1923, at a meeting held by the board of directors of the Brazilian Traction Light and Power Co. Ltd. in Toronto, managers decided that the Rio de Janeiro & São Paulo Telephone Company would change its name to the Brazilian Telephone Company. Decree No. 16.222 of November 28, 1923 authorized the company to continue operating in Brazil and allowed the translation of the name into Portuguese as Companhia Telefônica Brasileira (CTB).

== First period (1923-1966) ==
In 1923 Brazil had 100,000 telephones; 75% of which were controlled by CTB. On March 25, 1929, the company registered 100,000 installed telephones. In December 1936, it operated 166,000 telephones, including 99,000 automatics, 63,000 in Rio de Janeiro (with 16,000 manuals remaining) and 22,000 in São Paulo (with 19,000 manuals remaining). In February 1937, CTB reached 100,000 automatic telephones installed. On July 25, 1939, it reached 200,000 telephones installed by CTB. At the firm's request, the inauguration ceremony was held at the Catete Palace and attended by President Getúlio Vargas and Minister of Foreign Affairs Oswaldo Aranha, who called Carlos Martins, the Brazilian ambassador in Washington.

=== Operational structure ===
==== Administrative headquarters ====
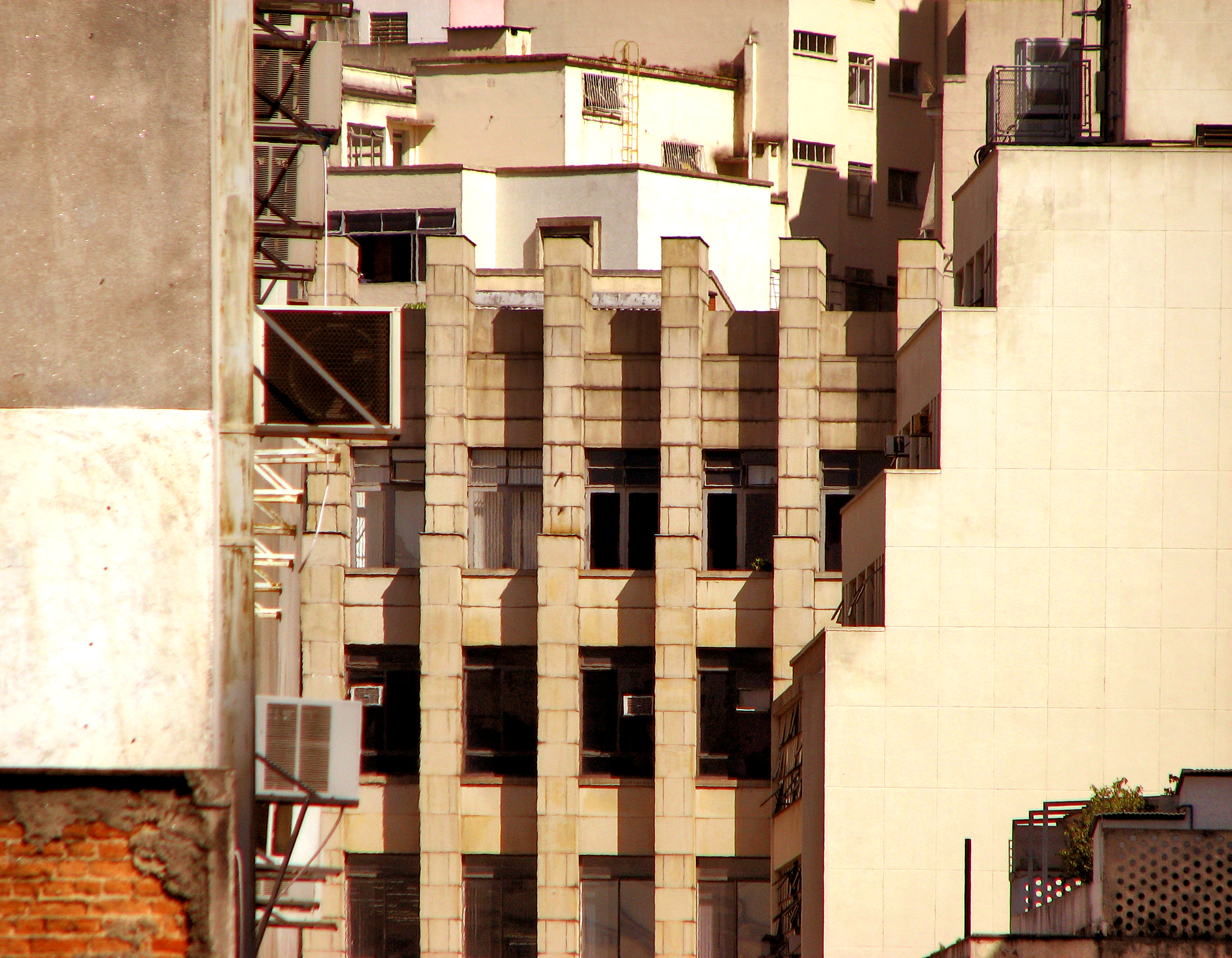
Detail of the facade of the Sete de Abril Building, listed in 1992.

The administrative headquarters were located in the city of Rio de Janeiro. The headquarters of the São Paulo Operations Directorate (DOSP) was based in the Sete de Abril Complex, whose main block is the Sete de Abril Building, an art deco property designed by Ramos de Azevedo in partnership with Severo & Villares in the renowned Ramos de Azevedo Office, and inaugurated on September 24, 1938. Its facade became a heritage site in 1992.

Currently closed, the complex is the second in the city of São Paulo to receive a permit to perform a retrofit within the rules of the Requalifica Centro Program. It will be reopened under the name Basílio 177 as an apartment complex with an open gallery of stores and restaurants.

=== Telephone exchanges ===
==== Federal District ====
Until 1929, all telephone exchanges in the city of Rio de Janeiro were manual. On December 31, with the inauguration of the North automatic telephone exchange, CTB made the first change to the city's telephone lines, giving the numbers of the main exchanges a one-digit prefix to identify them and forming a five-digit set: Central ("2" station), North automatic ("3" station), North manual ("4" station), Beira Mar ("5" station), Sul ("6" station), Ipanema ("7" station), Vila ("8" station), Ramos ("8-8" station), Piedade ("8-9" station) and Jardim ("9" station). On January 13, 1935, the number 2 was added to the beginning of each telephone prefix.

The manual telephone exchanges in Jacarepaguá, Marechal Hermes, Bangu, Campo Grande, Santa Cruz, Ilha do Governador and Paquetá became automated in 1965 when they began to be operated by Companhia Estadual de Telefones da Guanabara (CETEL).

- December 31, 1929 - inauguration of the city's first automatic telephone exchange;
- 1930 - automation of Ipanema ("7" Station, changed to "27") and Engenho de Dentro ("9" Station, changed to "29") and inauguration of Cascadura satellite ("9-8" Station, changed to "29-8" to replace the Piedade manual);
- 1931 - automation of Tiradentes ("2" Station, changed to "22");
- 1934 - inauguration of Ramos satellite ("9-6" Station, changed to "48-6" to replace the Ramos manual);
- 1935 - inauguration of Maracanã ("48" Station);
- 1936 - automation of Floriano ("43" Station, replacing the manual "24", formerly "4") and Botafogo ("26" Station, formerly "6"), and inauguration of Tiradentes ("42" Station) and Ipanema ("47" Station);
- 1938 - automation of Maracanã ("28" Station, former "8");
- 1939 - inauguration of Grajaú ("38" Station) and Ramos ("30" Station to replace Ramos satellite);
- 1940 - automation of Flamengo ("25" Station, formerly "5");
- 1946 - inauguration of Tiradentes ("32" Station), Copacabana ("37" Station) and Engenho de Dentro ("49" Station);
- 1948 - inauguration of Flamengo ("45" Station) and Botafogo ("46" Station);
- 1949 - inauguration of Tiradentes ("52" Station) and Grajaú ("58" Station);
- 1953 - inauguration of Maracanã ("54" Station) and Copacabana ("57" Station);
- 1954 - inauguration of Maracanã ("34" Station);
- 1956 - inauguration of Copacabana ("36" Station);
- 1959 - inauguration of Tiradentes ("31" Station).

==== Rio de Janeiro ====
Inauguration of automatic telephone exchanges:

- 1930 - Petrópolis;
- 1931 - Campos dos Goytacazes;
- 1941 - Niterói;
- 1947 - Teresópolis and Resende;
- 1948 - Vassouras;
- 1951 - São Gonçalo.

==== City of São Paulo ====
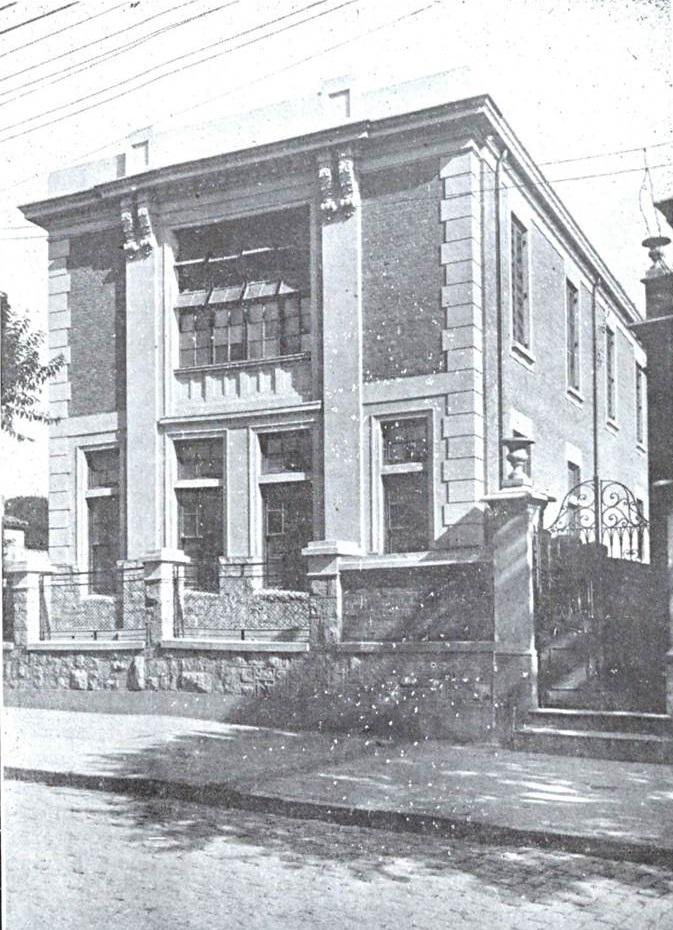
Palmeiras telephone exchange, where the first automatic office in São Paulo was installed (1928).

Until the beginning of 1928, the city of São Paulo only had manual telephone exchanges. On January 7, CTB added a digit before the numbers of the four main telephone exchanges, to form a set with five digits: Central ("2" Station), Cidade ("4" Station), Avenida ("7" Station) and Brás ("9" Station).

- July 14, 1928 - inauguration of Palmeiras ("5" Station), the city's first automatic telephone exchange;
- 1929 - automation of Benjamin Constant ("2" Station), renamed "32" in 1951;
- 1931 - inauguration of the Lapa satellite ("5-0" Station) to replace the Água Branca manual and the Penha manual;
- 1935 - Inauguration of the Ipiranga satellite ("3-0" Station) to replace the Cambuci manual, and transfer to the city of the Santo Amaro manual;
- 1936 - inauguration of Jardins ("8" Station, altered to "81" in 1966);
- 1938 - inauguration of Benjamin Constant ("3" Station, modified to "33" in 1951 to replace the Brás manual), Tatuapé satellite ("3-9" Station, modified to "9-0" in 1944 to replace the Penha manual) and Santana satellite ("3-8" Station) to replace the Santana manual;
- 1939 - inauguration of Benjamin Constant ("4" Station), changed to "34" in 1951 to replace the Cidade manual;
- 1944 - reopening of Brás ("9" Station), changed to "93" in 1961;
- 1946 - inauguration of Benjamin Constant ("6" Station), changed to "36" in 1951;
- 1948 - inauguration of Palmeiras ("52" Station);
- 1951 - inauguration of Vila Mariana ("70" and "7" stations, altered to "71" in 1966), and Benjamin Constant ("35" Station), and change of prefix of Avenida ("31" Station);
- 1952 - inauguration of Jardins ("80" Station);
- 1953 - inauguration of Benjamin Constant ("37" Station) and Santo Amaro ("61" Station) to replace Santo Amaro manual;
- 1955 - inauguration of Ipiranga ("63" Station) to replace Ipiranga satellite;
- 1956 - inauguration of Perdizes ("62" Station) and Itaquera, São Miguel Paulista and Guaianases manuals;
- 1960 - inauguration of Perdizes ("65" Station);
- 1961 - inauguration of Brás ("92" Station).

==== Interior of São Paulo ====
Inauguration of automatic telephone exchanges:

- 1930 - inauguration of automatic telephone service in Campinas. In 1962, it was extended with "8" Station. The telephone numbering of the first exchange was changed to "9". In 1964, "2" Station was launched;
- 1930 - Jaú;
- 1934 - Inauguration of the automatic telephone service in Santos. In 1948, it was expanded by cutting the area and the "4" Station was launched. The telephone numbering of the Brás Cubas exchange was changed to "2" Station, serving the center and the port region;
- 1940 - Marília;
- 1941 - Pompéia;
- 1959 - Araraquara and Lins;
- 1961 - Rio Claro and São João da Boa Vista;
- 1963 - São José dos Campos and Taubaté;
- 1964 - Bauru and Guarujá;
- 1965 - Taboão da Serra.

==== Minas Gerais ====
- 1931 - inauguration of automatic telephone service in Belo Horizonte.

==== Espírito Santo ====
- 1954 - inauguration of automatic telephone service in Vitória.

=== Services ===
==== Public telephones ====
The first coin-operated public telephones were installed in Santos in March 1934 and in Rio de Janeiro in 1935. Later, they were installed in bars, pharmacies and grocery stores. In order to facilitate use, telephone tokens began to be used instead of coins.

==== Direct distance dialing (DDD) ====
In 1958, CTB inaugurated the first long-distance automatic direct dialing system (DDD) in Latin America between the cities of São Paulo and Santos using coaxial cables. The following year, the system was inaugurated between the cities of Rio de Janeiro and Niterói.

==== Telephone directories ====
The first telephone directory produced by CTB was launched in 1918, when it belonged to the Rio de Janeiro & São Paulo Telephone Company. It continued to be published by the company until 1946, when LTB-Listas Telefônicas Brasileiras, founded by businessman G. J. Huber, former director of CTB's directory department, began its activities as a supplier of telephone directories for Rio de Janeiro. Huber, in exchange for the exclusive rights to sell advertisements, offered to publish the list of subscribers and the Yellow Pages free of charge.

In 1954, CTB sold its shares in LTB to another company, which allowed LTB to produce lists for other concessionaires, while maintaining the contract to publish CTB lists.

==== Publications ====
In 1928, the Sino Azul magazine, a monthly periodical distributed free of charge to CTB employees, was launched. The magazine dealt with subjects such as news, cultural aspects, activities in the telephony sector and social notes related to the company. Considered one of the first national business publications, it followed the evolution of telephony in Brazil and was published continuously until 1989.

== Crisis and nationalization ==
Due to the global economic crisis and World War II, telephone equipment stopped arriving in Brazil. From 1940 onwards, the queues for lines increased; in 1945, the queue in Rio de Janeiro amounted to 29,000 people and in São Paulo to 21,000 people. The crisis worsened due to the high import tariffs on equipment. The authority to set prices remained divided between the three branches of government and prevented the uniform establishment of technical and economic criteria. By 1956 the waiting list had reached 139,000 people in Rio de Janeiro and 151,000 in São Paulo. The high demand for telephone lines represented a serious problem in the main urban centers.

Long-distance calls required hours of waiting. Telephone communications with the rest of the world also failed to meet the international needs of Brazil's expanding economy. The cities of São Paulo, Rio de Janeiro, Belo Horizonte and Brasília were interconnected via microwave links. Communication to most of the states was via radiotelegraph and radiotelephone services, mostly run by foreign concessionaires (Telégrafo Nacional, Radiobrás, Radional, Western, All América and Italcable).

=== Changes and loss of concessions ===
The holding company Brazilian Traction Light and Power Co. Ltd. established telephone services in Espírito Santo and Minas Gerais by founding Companhia Telefônica do Espírito Santo (CTES) in 1951 and Companhia Telefônica de Minas Gerais (CTMG) in 1953, both subsidiaries of CTB. In 1955, CTB served 175 cities in the state of São Paulo, but automated service was only available in the capital and five other towns. Dissatisfaction with the service provided led the government to authorize the creation of local telephone companies in several cities with the intention of implementing automatic exchanges.

In 1958, the Companhia Telefônica da Borda do Campo (CTBC) assumed responsibility for services in the municipalities of ABC Region, as the inadequacy of the telephone connection between these cities and São Paulo had serious economic consequences for the region, which was experiencing fast industrial growth.

During the same period, CTB lost coverage in important cities such as Piracicaba to Telefônica Piracicaba, Jundiaí to Telefônica Jundiaí, Sorocaba to Cia Rede Telefônica Sorocabana, Osasco to Cia Telefônica Suburbana Paulista, Guarulhos to Cia Telefônica de Guarulhos, Mogi das Cruzes to Telefônica Mogi das Cruzes, Jacareí to Telefônica Jacareí, Pindamonhangaba to Cia Telefônica de Pindamonhangaba, Guaratinguetá to the S. M.T.A., São Vicente to Cia Telefônica do Litoral Paulista, São Carlos to Telefônica Central Paulista and Franca to Cia Telefônica de Franca; all of which inaugurated automatic exchanges. It also lost licences in Caçapava to COTESP, Cubatão and Suzano to CTBC, and in other cities such as Aparecida, Atibaia, Cotia, Itanhaém and Ourinhos.

=== Nationalization ===
CTB strike in 1964.

On November 28, 1956, during the Kubitschek government, the Brazilian Telephone Company was nationalized and officially named Companhia Telefônica Brasileira by Decree No. 40,439. Its headquarters were transferred to Rio de Janeiro and its capital divided between seven shareholders: six native Brazilians, each holding a single share, and the holding company Brazilian Traction Light and Power Co. Ltd, now known as Brascan - Brasil Canada Ltda, with almost a million shares.

In 1962, the Brazilian Telecommunications Code was instituted by President João Goulart amid a strong nationalist campaign against the Brascan group and other foreign companies. On March 31, 1962, the federal government, in contact with CTB's management since December 1961 regarding its purchase, decreed intervention in the company for a period of six months, which was extended successively until 1966.

Although the Castelo Branco government expressed an interest in opening up opportunities for private capital to participate in the sector, it ended up nationalizing CTB after extensive negotiations with the Brascan group. In March 1966, Embratel, which was responsible for two-thirds of the Brazilian telephone system and operated in an area containing 45% of the Brazilian population, took control of CTB.

== New CTB (1966-1976) ==
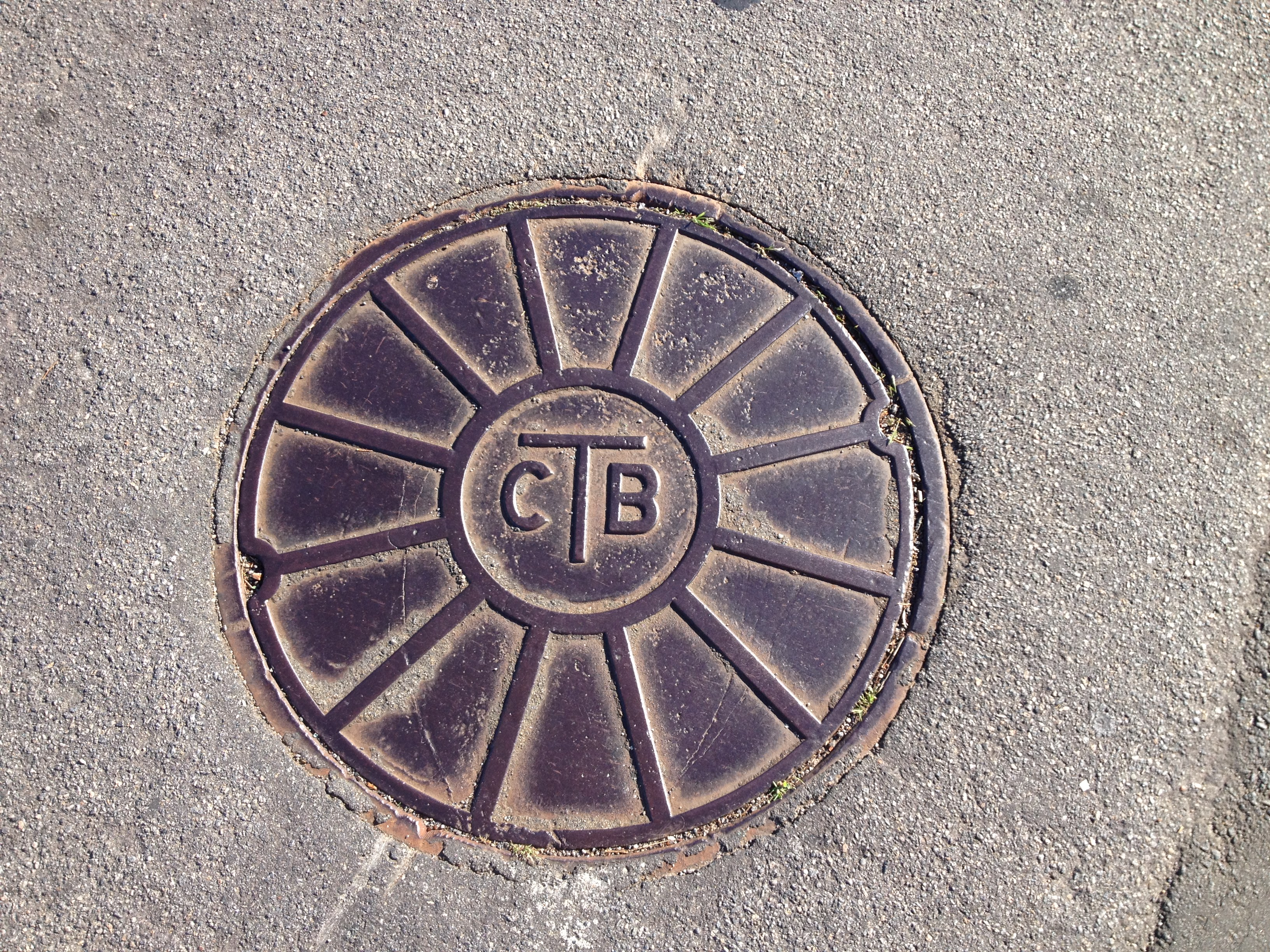
Manhole with the CTB logo.

In 1966, CTB had 584,000 installed telephone terminals in its coverage area, excluding subsidiaries, including 245,000 in Guanabara, 183,000 in São Paulo, 77,000 in the interior of São Paulo and 34,000 in the state of Rio de Janeiro. 529,000 terminals were in service and 817,000 telephones had been installed. The Brazilian Constitution of 1967 created the Ministry of Communications, which surveyed the telephony situation in Brazil, launched a plan for emergency and long-term solutions and divided CTB's area of operation, assigning it the responsibility of serving the states of Guanabara and Rio de Janeiro.

CTB presidents during this period:

- 1966-1969: Landry Sales Gonçalves;
- 1969-1974: José de Siqueira Meneses Filho;
- 1974-1976: José Nunes Camargo.

=== First expansion plan ===
Between 1966 and 1971, CTB launched its first major expansion plan through the system of self-financing telephone lines. Initially, the project focused on the long queue of subscribers who had been waiting to be called since the 1940s and 1950s. The rotary-type electromechanical stations installed in the city of Rio de Janeiro and the uniselector type in the city of São Paulo, which had not yet reached their maximum capacity, were expanded. From then on, the new exchanges installed were electromechanical crossbars.

==== Guanabara ====
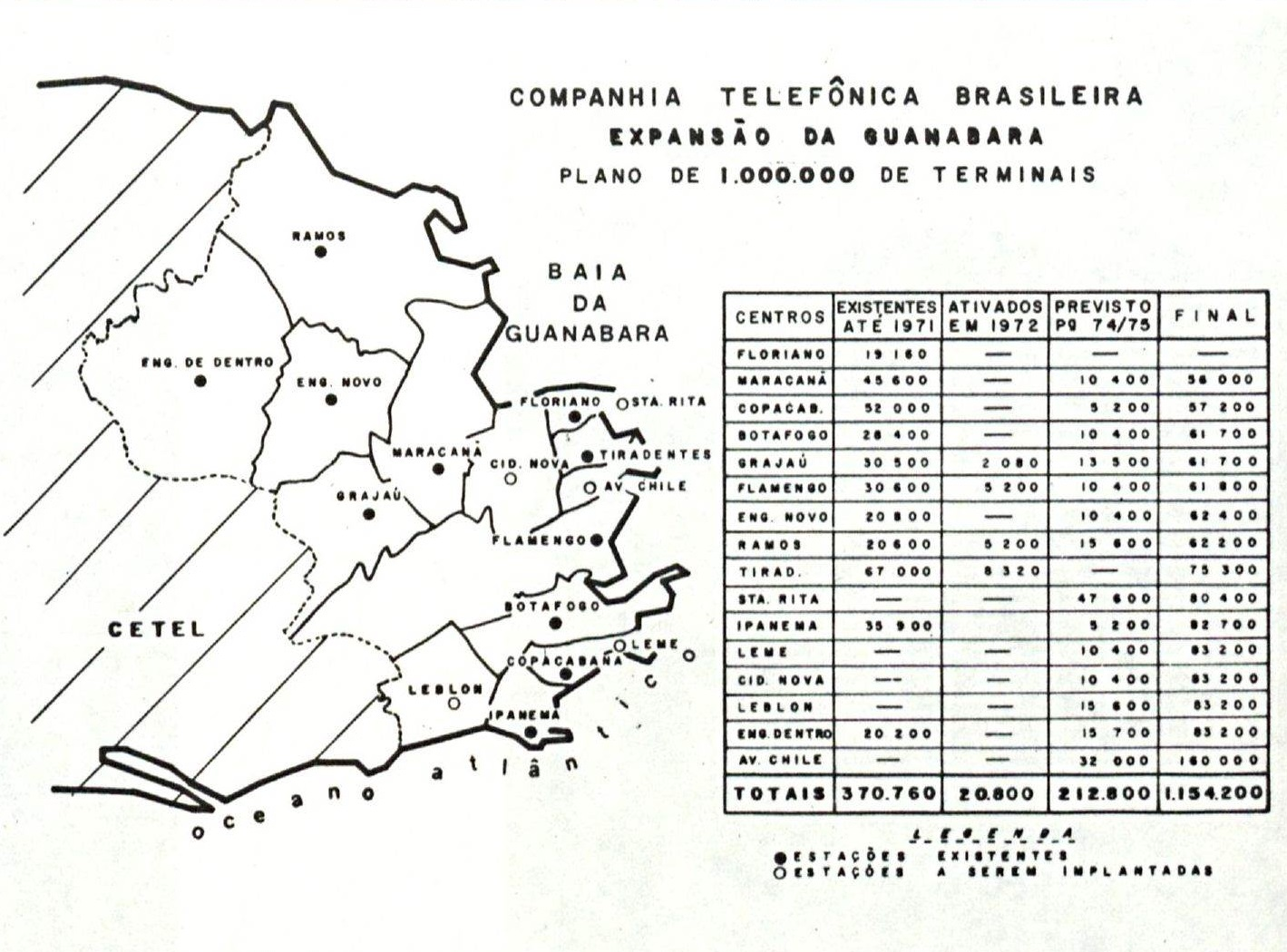
Telephone centers in the city of Rio de Janeiro (1976).

Between 1966 and 1971, 129,000 telephone terminals were installed, rotary exchanges were expanded and new Pentaconta 1000 (Standard Electrica) crossbar exchanges equipped for the DDD system were set up. The plan's first telephone exchange was inaugurated in December 1966 in Copacabana ("56" Station) and the first crossbar exchange was installed in July 1968 in Engenho Novo ("61" Station). 10 existing telephone exchanges were renovated and the Engenho Novo telephone exchange was inaugurated in 1968.

In 1969, telephone numbers in Rio de Janeiro received the digit 2 at the beginning of their prefixes. The plan was finalized in 1971 with the installation of the Tiradentes ("224" Station), Copacabana ("255" Station), Engenho Novo ("281" Station) and Ipanema ("287" Station) exchanges.

==== São Paulo ====
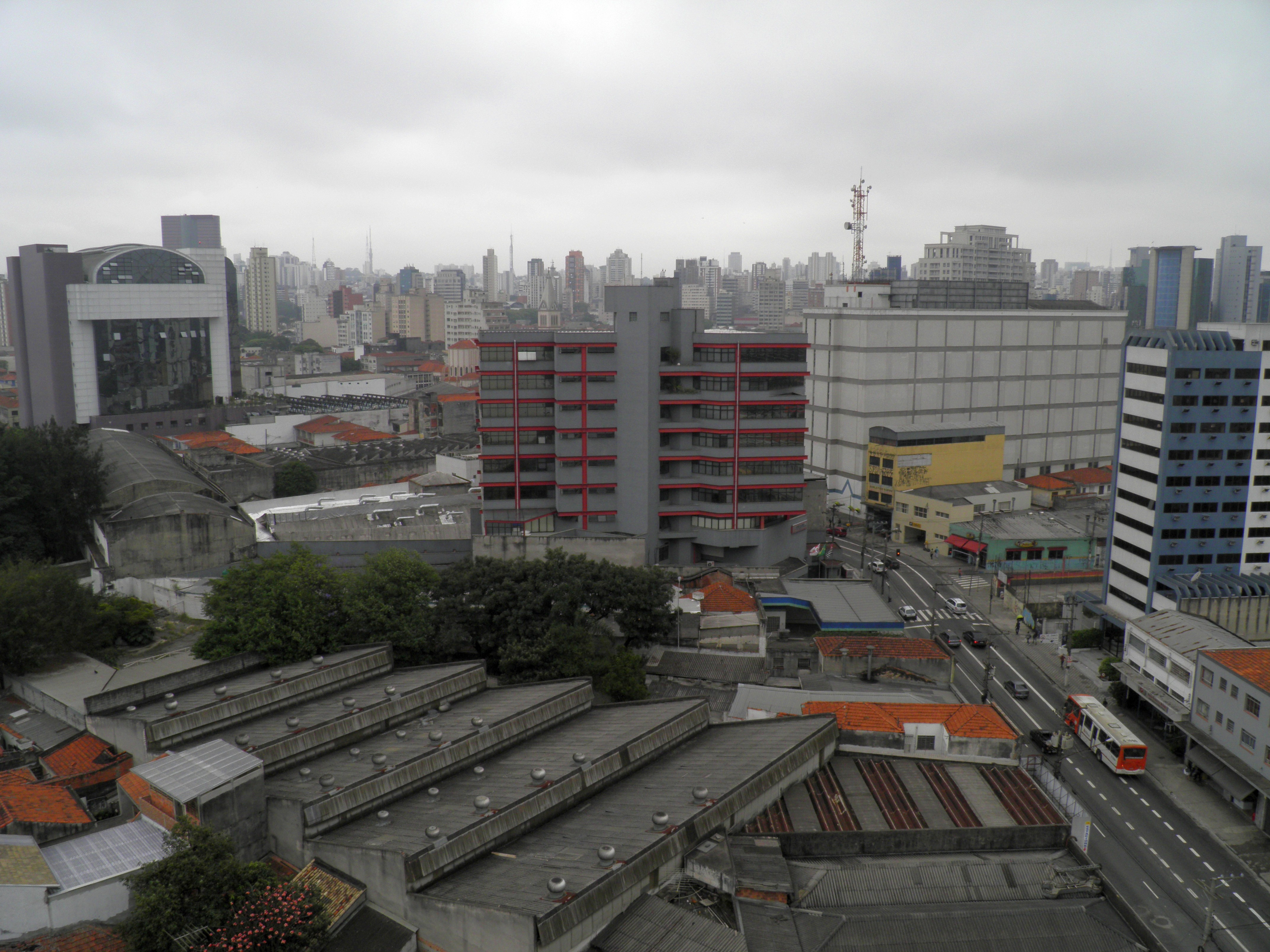
The Pinheiros telephone center stands to the right.

Between 1966 and 1970, more than 205,000 telephone terminals were installed in two stages: expansion of the uniselector exchanges and installation of new ARF (Ericsson) crossbar exchanges equipped for the DDD system. The project began in March 1966 with the extension of the Ipiranga telephone exchange ("63" Station). The first crossbar exchange was installed in March 1967 in Jardins ("282" Station), the first time a three-digit prefix was used in Brazil. Between 1968 and 1970, 16 new telephone centers were opened:

- First stage: Jabaquara, Lapa (deactivating the Lapa satellite exchange), Penha (deactivating the Tatuapé satellite exchange), Santa Ifigênia, Santana (deactivating the Santana satellite exchange), Anhangabaú, Casa Verde, Consolação, Liberdade and Paraíso (deactivating the Avenida satellite exchange);
- Second stage: Pinheiros, Santo Amaro (the telephone center inaugurated in 1953 was renamed Campo Belo), Ermelino Matarazzo, Guaianases, Itaquera and São Miguel Paulista.

The plan was finalized in September 1970 with the installation of the Brás telephone exchange ("292" Station).

Interior of São Paulo

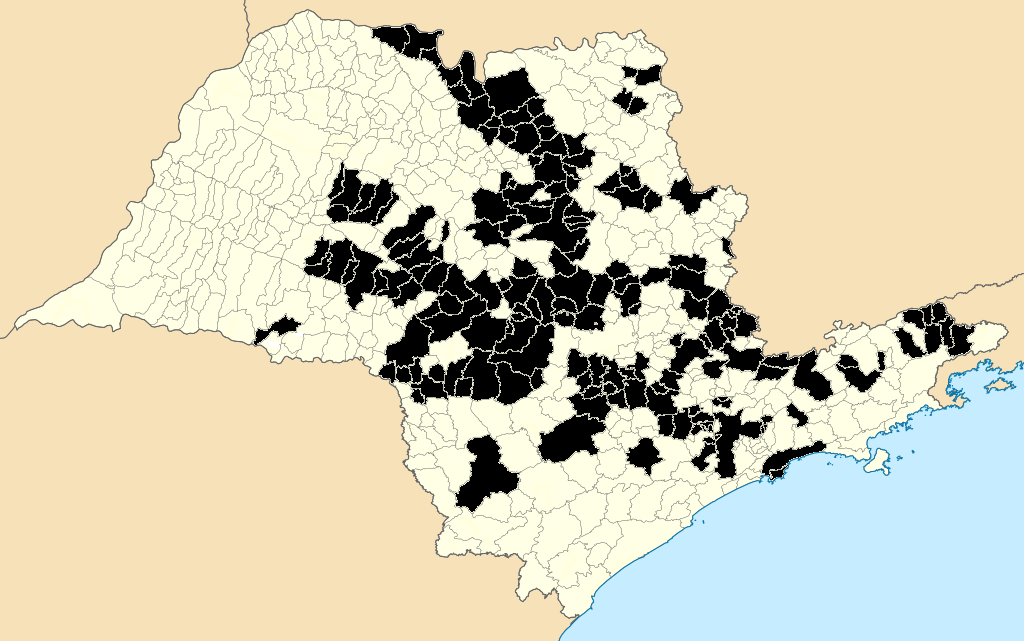
CTB coverage area in the state of São Paulo (1973).

Between 1967 and 1971, 35,000 telephone terminals and new automatic exchanges were installed in different cities. Contracts were signed for the installation of automatic networks in 36 cities, including 19 where the telephone system was automated with 5005 crossbar exchanges (Plessey) equipped for DDD and one-digit prefixes.

In 1968, the Embu automatic exchange was inaugurated, and in 1971 "3" Station in Santos was installed in a new building on Washington Luiz Avenue. Construction work was finished on the telephone exchanges in Amparo, Carapicuíba, Ibitinga, Indaiatuba, Lorena, Salto, São Manuel, São Roque, Sertãozinho and Taquaritinga, but these were only activated later by Telesp.

=== One million phone plan ===
On December 31, 1971, 899,000 telephone terminals, excluding subsidiaries, were in operation, with a total of 1,125,000 telephones in service. In October 1971, CTB and its subsidiaries launched the plan for the installation of one million telephones by 1975, a priority target for the federal government in the telecommunications sector; 855,000 telephone terminals would be allocated to the CTB area. In 1972, the plan was updated to 920,000 terminals, distributed as follows:

- Guanabara - 234,000 telephone terminals. In 1972, the Flamengo ("285" Station), Grajaú ("288" Station), Ramos ("280" Station) and Tiradentes ("244" Station) telephone centers were inaugurated. In 1975, the Leblon telephone exchange was launched, as were the Leme and Santa Rita stations in 1976. Work has begun on the Arcos (the largest in Latin America with a final capacity of 200,000 terminals) and Cidade Nova telephone centers;
- Rio de Janeiro - 136,000 telephone terminals;
- São Paulo - 375,000 telephone terminals. In 1972, 6,600 terminals were installed in the Jabaquara, Paraíso, Pinheiros and São Miguel telephone centers. In 1973, Telesp inaugurated the telephone exchanges in Campo Belo ("241" Station), Paraíso ("289" Station), Penha ("296" Station), Pinheiros ("210" Station) and Santo Amaro ("246" Station), and continued work on the Guarani telephone center ("271" Station) and the projected telephone centers in Jaguaré, Tremembé and Vila Gustavo;
- Interior of São Paulo - 175,000 telephone terminals. Automatic exchanges were installed in Jacareí, Piracicaba, Votuporanga (managed network) and Promissão, and other stations were expanded. Construction was concluded on the telephone exchanges in Birigui, Barretos, Bebedouro, Piraju, Capivari, Laranjal Paulista, Matão, Paulínia, Pirajuí, Poá and Porto Feliz, which were all activated by Telesp.

500,000 Ericsson terminals, 300,000 Standard Electrica terminals and 160,000 NEC Brasil terminals have been contracted to implement the plan.

=== Public telephones ===
In 1970, after the implementation of the expansion plan, CTB launched the "vilafones", public telephones placed in commercial houses and residences situated in low-income neighborhoods. The first public payphones in Brazil were inaugurated on January 20, 1972, in the city of Rio de Janeiro and on January 25, 1972, in the city of São Paulo.

=== Operational integration ===
In 1972, Telebrás was created as a holding company to implement the new telecommunications policy. In the same year, CTB transferred control of its subsidiaries CTMG and CTES to the firm. Ordinance No. 331 of May 26, 1972 accredited CTB as a pole company in the states of São Paulo, Guanabara and Rio de Janeiro, in accordance with the guidelines and policy of unifying the telephone system adopted by the Ministry of Communications. Consequently, CTB incorporated or began to manage several telephone companies:

==== Rio de Janeiro ====
- Incorporations: S.T.M. Nova Friburgo, Cia. Telefônica Fluminense (Nova Iguaçu), Cia. Telefônica Duque de Caxias, Cia. Telefônica Barra Mansa, Cia. Telefônica Meriti, Telefônica Valença, Telefônica Cambuci, Cia. Telefônica Laje do Muriaé and Telefônica Miracema, Cia. Telefônica de Itaperuna and Cia. Telefônica de Cachoeiras de Macacu, Cia. Telefônica de Itaocara, Telefônica de Miguel Pereira and Cia. Telefônica Paduana.

Interior of São Paulo

- Incorporations: S.T.M. Paulínia, S.T.M. Tabatinga and S.T.M. São José dos Campos, S.M.T.A. Araraquara, S.M.T.A. Taubaté, S.M.T.A. Guarujá and Soc. Telefônica da Estância (Serra Negra), S.T.M. Aguaí, S.T.M. Porto Ferreira, S.M.T.A. Rio Claro and Telefônica Lemense;
- Managed networks: S.M.T.A. Guaratinguetá, S.M.T.A. Lins, S.M.T.A. São João da Boa Vista, Cia. Rede Telefônica Sorocabana, Cia. Telefônica de Guarulhos, Telefônica Jacareí, Cia. Telefônica Rio Preto, Cia. Paulista de Telecomunicações (Piracicaba), Telefônica Jundiaí, Cia. Telefônica Média Mogiana (Casa Branca) and Empresa Telefônica Paulista (Presidente Prudente).

CTB also tried to incorporate Companhia de Telecomunicações do Estado de São Paulo (COTESP), which covered a large area of the state of São Paulo, but was unsuccessful.

=== DDD/IDD systems ===
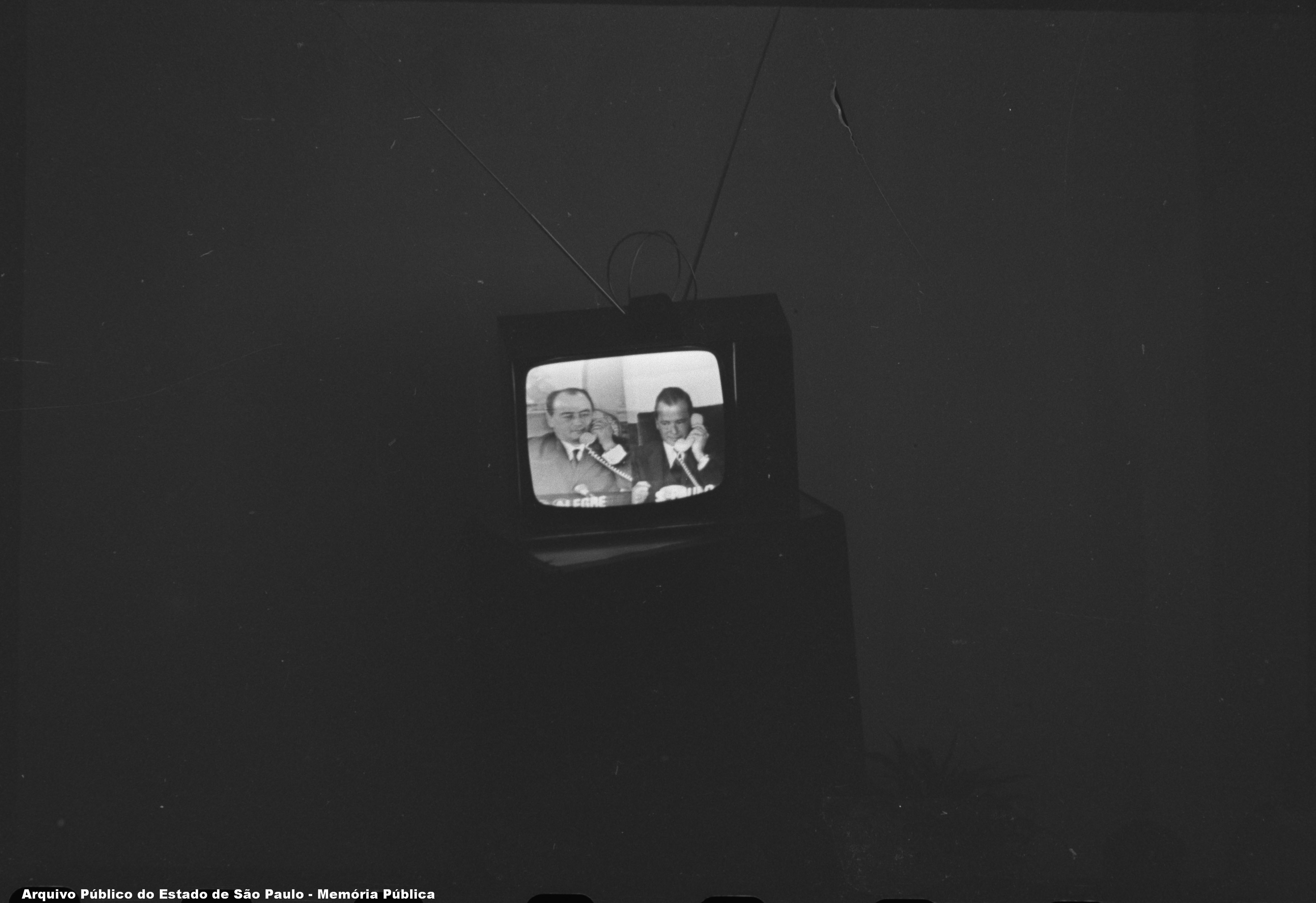
Inauguration of São Paulo's DDD system with live broadcast by TV Tupi (1970).

In 1969, the Direct Distance Dialing (DDD) system was introduced throughout Brazil. Between 1969 and 1973, the system was integrated into the following CTB areas:

- Guanabara: city of Rio de Janeiro;
- Rio de Janeiro: cities of Niterói, Araruama, Barra do Piraí, Barra Mansa (managed network), Cabo Frio, Campos, Itaboraí, Itaguaí, Itatiaia, Magé, Petrópolis, Resende, São Gonçalo, São Pedro da Aldeia, Teresópolis and Volta Redonda;
- São Paulo: the cities of São Paulo (with an official inauguration in July 1970 broadcast live by TV Tupi), Santos, Guarujá and Cubatão (incoming only), and Presidente Prudente (managed network).

The International Direct Dialing (IDD) system was implemented in these cities by Telerj and Telesp.

== Coverage area: Rio de Janeiro ==
Locations served by CTB in the state of Rio de Janeiro transferred to Telerj in 1976:

Telephone center	Automatic control panel	
Telephone center	Rotary	Cross bars
Tiradentes	221 (1959); 222 (1931); 242 (1936); 232 (1946); 252 (1949)	221 (1969); 224 (1971); 244 (1972)
Engenho Novo		261 (1968); 281 (1971); 201 (1974)
Floriano	223 (1929); 243 (1936)	
Santa Rita		233 (1976); 253 (1976); 263 (1976); 293 (1976)
Cidade Nova		273 (Note: Installed by CTB but activated by Telerj); 293
Maracanã	234 (1954); 254 (1953); 228 (1938); 248 (1935)	264 (1969); 284 (1974)
Leblon		274 (1975); 294 (1975); 239; 259
Flamengo	225 (1940); 245 (1948)	265 (1969); 285 (1972); 205 (1974)
Copacabana	236 (1956); 256 (1966); 237 (1946); 257 (1953)	235 (1969); 255 (1971)
Leme		275 (1976); 295
Botafogo	226 (1936); 246 (1948)	266 (1970); 286 (1976)
Ipanema	227 (1930); 247 (1936)	267 (1969); 287 (1971)
Grajaú	238 (1939); 258 (1949)	268 (1969); 288 (1974); 208 (1976)
Engenho de Dentro	229 (1930); 249 (1946)	269 (1976); 289 (1976)
Chile Avenue (Arcos)		220; 240; 262; 282
Ramos	230 (1939)	260 (1969); 280 (1972); 270

== Coverage area: São Paulo ==
Locations served by CTB in the state of São Paulo transferred to Telesp in 1973:

=== City of São Paulo ===
Telephone center	Automatic control panel	
Telephone center	Uniselector	Cross bars
Santa Ifigênia		220 (1968); 221 (1969)
Anhangabaú		227 (1969); 228 (1970)
Benjamin Constant	32 (1929); 33 (1938); 34 (1939); 35 (1951); 36 (1946); 37 (1953)	239 (1967)
Palmeiras	51 (1928); 52 (1948)	
Consolação		256 (1969); 257 (1970)
Lapa		260 (1968)
Campo Belo	61 (1953)	267 (1967); 241 (Note: Installed by CTB but activated by Telesp)
Perdizes	62 (1956); 65 (1960)	262 (1969)
Casa Verde		266 (1969)
Santo Amaro		269 (1969); 246
Vila Mariana	70 (1951); 71 (1951)	
Guarani		271
Ipiranga	63 (1955)	273 (1969); 274 (1969)
Jabaquara		275 (1968); 276 (1970)
Liberdade		278 (1969); 279 (1970)
Jardins	80 (1952); 81 (1936)	282 (1967)
Pinheiros		286 (1969); 210
Paraíso		287 (1969); 288 (1969); 289
Brás	92 (1961); 93 (1944)	292 (1970)
Penha		295 (1968); 296
São Miguel Paulista		297-0 (1970)
Ermelino Matarazzo		297-4 (1970)
Itaquera		297-6 (1970)
Guaianases		297-8 (1970)
Santana		298 (1968); 299 (1969)

=== Interior of São Paulo ===
Location	Telephone exchange	Year
Aguaí	automatic (Note: Replaced by new automatic telephone exchange by Telesp.)	1962
Águas da Prata	manual	
Águas de Lindóia	manual	
Agudos	manual	
Altair	manual	
Alto Alegre	manual	
Américo Brasiliense	manual	
Amparo	manual (Note: CTB constructed the building where the automatic exchange was installed, activated by Telesp.)	
Analândia	manual	
Arandu	manual	
Araraquara	automatic	1959
Areias	PS	
Areiópolis	manual	
Avaí	manual	
Avanhandava	manual	
Avaré	automatic	1970
Barra Bonita	automatic	1970
Barretos	manual	
Barrinha	manual	
Barueri	manual	
Bauru	automatic	1964
Bebedouro	manual	
Bernardino de Campos	manual	
Bertioga	manual	
Bocaína	manual	
Boituva	manual	
Botucatu	automatic	1970
Bragança Paulista	automatic	1970
Brotas	manual	
Cabrália Paulista	manual	
Cafelândia	manual	
Cajobi	manual	
Campinas - "2" Station	automatic	1964
Campinas - "8" Station	automatic	1962
Campinas - "9" Station	automatic	1930
Cândido Rodrigues	manual	
Capivari	manual	
Carapicuíba	manual (shared with Barueri)	
Cerqueira César	manual	
Cerquilho	manual	
Cesário Longe	manual	
Chavantes	manual	
Colina	manual	
Concha	manual	
Corumbataí	manual	
Cravinhos	manual	
Cristais Paulistas	manual	
Cruzeiro	automatic	1970
Dobrada	manual	
Dois Córregos	manual	
Embu	automatic	1968
Enseada	automatic	1969
Fernando Prestes	PS	
Ferraz de Vasconcelos	manual	
Francisco Morato	manual	
Franco da Rocha	manual	
Gália	manual	
Garça	automatic	1970
Glicério	manual	
Guaiçara	manual	
Guaraci	manual	
Guarantã	manual	
Guararema	manual	
Guariba	manual	
Guarujá	automatic	1964
Herculância	manual	
Ibaté	manual	
Ibitinga	manual	
Icém	manual	
Igaraçu do Tietê	manual (shared with Barra Bonita)	
Indaiatuba	manual	
Ipaussu	manual	
Itapecerica da Serra	manual	
Itapetininga	automatic	1970
Itapeva	automatic	1970
Itapevi	PS	
Itapira	automatic	1970
Itápolis	manual	
Itapuí	manual	
Itaquequecetuba	manual	
Itatiba	automatic	1970
Itatinga	manual	
Itarapina	manual	
Itu	automatic	1980
Jaborandi	manual	
Jaboticabaí	automatic	1970
Jandira	manual	
Jaú	automatic	1930
Jeriquara	PS	
Joanópolis	manual	
Laranjal Paulista	manual	
Lavrinhas	manual	
Leme	automatic	1962
Lençois Paulistas	automatic	1970
Lindóia	manual	
Lorena	manual	
Mairinque	manual	
Manduri	manual	
Maracaí	manual	
Marília	automatic	1940
Matão	manual	
Mineiros do Tietê	manual	
Mococa	automatic	1970
Mogi Guaçu	automatic	1970
Mogi Mirim	automatic	1970
Monte Alegre do Sul	manual	
Monte Azul Paulista	manual	
Olímpia	manual	
Oriente	manual	
Orindiúva	manual	
Pardinho	manual	
Paulínia	manual	
Paulo de Faria	manual	
Pederneiras	manual	
Pedreira	manual	
Penápolis	automatic	1970
Pereiras	manual	
Piedade	automatic	1970
Piracaia	manual	
Piraju	manual	
Pirajuí	manual	
Pirapora do Bom Jesus		
Piratininga	manual	
Pitangueiras	manual	
Poá	manual	
Pompéia	automatic	1941
Pontal	manual	
Porto Feliz	manual	
Pradópolis	manual	
Presidente Alves	manual	
Promissão	automatic	1972
Queluz	manual	
Quintana	manual	
Quiririm	manual	
Rafard	manual (shared with Capivari)	
Restinga	manual	
Ribeirão Bonito	manual	
Rincão	manual	
Rio Claro	automatic	1961
Riolândia	manual	
Roseira	manual	
Salto	manual	
Santa Cruz do Rio Pardo	manual	
Santa Gertrudes	manual	
Santa Lúcia	manual	
Santa Maria da Serra	manual	
Santa Rosa do Viterbo	manual	
Santana de Parnaíba	vilafone	
Santos - "2" Station	automatic	1934
Santos - "3" Station	automatic	1971
Santos - "4" Station	automatic	1948
São José da Bela Vista	manual	
São José do Barreiro	manual	
São José dos Campos	automatic	1963
São Manuel	manual	
São Pedro	manual	
São Roque	manual	
São Simão	manual	
Sarutaiá	manual	
Serra Azul	manual	
Serra Negra	automatic	1967
Serrana	manual	
Sertãozinho	manual	
Severínia	manual	
Silveiras	PS	
Socorro	manual	
Sousas	manual	
Tabatinga	manual	
Taboão da Serra	automatic	1965
Taiúva	manual	
Taquaritinga	manual	
Tatuí	automatic	1970
Taubaté	automatic	1963
Terra Roxa	manual	
Tietê	manual	
Torrinha	manual	
Tremembé	manual	
Vera Cruz	manual	
Vicente de Carvalho	automatic	1969
Viradouro	manual	

== End of business ==
In April 1973, Telecomunicações de São Paulo (Telesp) was created. The following month, CTB transferred all its assets in the state to the new company, as had already been determined years earlier by the Ministry of Communications. CTB began to concentrate on expanding and modernizing services in the area formed by the states of Guanabara and Rio de Janeiro. After the merger of the two states in 1975, CTB was abolished and incorporated by Telecomunicações do Rio de Janeiro (Telerj) in February 1976. At the time, CTB operated 649,400 telephone terminals in the city of Rio de Janeiro, distributed over 57 exchanges installed in 14 telephone centers.

The telephone exchange buildings built by CTB, including the oldest ones that were not demolished, are still used today by Vivo in the state of São Paulo and Oi in the state of Rio de Janeiro.

== See also ==
- Telesp
- Telebrás
- Telefônica Brasil
