= Rádio Beach Park =

Rádio Beach Park (ZYE 410)

Aquiraz, Ceará; Brazil
- Broadcast area: Fortaleza, Ceará
- Frequency: 102.7 MHz

Programming
- Language: Portuguese
- Format: Music; Adult contemporary

Ownership
- Owner: Rádio Primeira Capital Ltda.
- Operator: Beach Park

History
- First air date: January 1, 2011
- Former names: Beach Park FM

Technical information
- Licensing authority: ANATEL
- Class: A3
- ERP: 46,4 kW

Links
- Public license information: Profile

Rádio Beach Park (ZYE 410) is a Brazilian radio station based in Fortaleza, Ceará, and licensed to Aquiraz. The station was inaugurated on January 1, 2011, and is part of the group that controls the water park of the same name, located in its city of origin. Its music program is based on the adult contemporary format, with an emphasis on rock and indie music, and on Brazilian rhythms such as samba and MPB.

== History ==
Due to spending cuts involving the companies of the Oi telecom group and the low return of the affiliates of the Oi FM network, its affiliate in Fortaleza that operated on 101.7 MHz ended its branded broadcasts on July 1, 2010. The radio station continued to play music from the genre characteristic of its predecessor, continuing its operations without a defined name.

In December 2010, it was confirmed that the Beach Park group would take over 101.7 MHz. During this period, the station looked forward to the arrival of a new station on the frequency, with the official launch of Beach Park FM taking place on January 1, 2011. The station was launched through a partnership between the Beach Park complex and businessmen Kaco Cardozo, Jeferson Filho and Júlio Maciel. Alexandre Lima, from Mix FM Fortaleza, was in charge of the artistic and commercial departments.

In December 2012, after negotiations with Sistema Jangadeiro de Comunicação (a group that had members as partners in the frequency, who managed independent ventures), it was announced that Beach Park FM would cease to operate on the terrestrial dial to make way for a new affiliate of the all news radio network BandNews FM, which would not be launched until March 2013. The radio station ceased operations on 101.7 MHz at 11:59 p.m. on March 10, 2013, and began broadcasting on the internet from then on, with Tribuna BandNews FM joining moments later. Just over 20 days after the change, the already renamed Rádio Beach Park announced that it would return to the dial on April 1 due to requests "from loyal listeners who asked for the return to FM". The new frequency from that day on was 92.9 MHz, taking the place of FM 92, in a partnership with Grupo Cidade de Comunicação.

In April 2018, it was announced that Rádio Beach Park would be leaving 92.9 MHz for the debut of the all news radio network Jovem Pan News, a new project from Grupo Cidade that was scheduled to go on air in May. The station announced a move to 102.7 MHz, a migrant AM-FM station from the now-defunct Rádio Primeira Capital de Aquiraz, then owned by the Grupo Empresarial Etevaldo Nogueira (also responsible for Rádio Iracema de Fortaleza), which operated on the 1050 kHz frequency and was acquired by Beach Park. The station left 92.9 MHz at midnight on April 21, remaining broadcasting only on the internet. 102.7 MHz was put on the air during the afternoon of June 21, 2018, on an experimental basis, and began broadcasting radio programming on July 5.

== Programas ==
- Agora Pod (Alexandre Lima and Guga de Castro)
- Blog Beach Park (Alexandre Lima)
- Cafuné (Guga de Castro)
- Enquanto Houver Sol
- Essência Beach Park
- Fecha Tudo e Vamo Embora
- Hey Ho (Miguel Pontes)
- Live Beach Park
- Lounge Beach Park (André Wesarusk and Rachell Duran)
- Música do Brasil
- Na Onda (Dora Vergueiro)
- Pé na Areia
- Playlist Nossa de Cada Dia (Alexandre Lima)
- Samba Esporte Fino
- Sunrise (André Wesarusk)
- Sunset (Rachel Duran and André Wesarusk)
- Trip FM (Paulo Lima)^{[a]}
- Vamo Lessa (Marcos Lessa)
- Vozes do Brasil (Patricia Palumbo)^{[b]}

Notes

^{a} - Independent program signed by Trip magazine.
^{b} - Independent program broadcast in partnership with Rádio Vozes.
