= TV Rocinha =

TV Rocinha (TV ROC) is a Brazilian community television channel, a blend of pay television and community television, serving Favela da Rocinha, Rio de Janeiro. TV ROC received an award from the magazine "ARede" and had a project approved by UNESCO to improve the quality of the information conveyed.

== History ==
TV ROC was created in 1996 with a contract with Net Communication Services, enabled the creation of a combined pay-TV operator and a community channel.
