= Jair Ribeiro =

Brazilian entrepreneur

- Born: October 16, 1959 (age 66); São Paulo, State of São Paulo, Brazil
- Education: University of São Paulo, Fundação Armando Alvares Penteado, University of California, Berkeley
- Occupations: Entrepreneur, investor
- Known for: Founder of Associação Parceiros da Educação, Casa do Saber

Jair Ribeiro (born October 16, 1959; São Paulo, State of São Paulo) is a Brazilian entrepreneur, founder, and president of Associação Parceiros da Educação and Casa do Saber, as well as co-investor and operating partner of Proz Educação, a company focused on consolidating vocational education schools (controlled by EB Capital). He is also a shareholder and member of the Board of Directors of Alicerce Educação, a member of the advisory board of Todos pela Educação and a former member of the Management Committee of the São Paulo State Education Department and of the Centro Paula Souza Institute. He was a partner in the controlling group and a member of the Board of Directors of Banco Indusval & Partners, and managing partner of Sertrading S.A, one of the main Brazilian foreign trade companies.

In 1988, Ribeiro was one of the founders and chief executive officer of Banco Patrimônio, which became the third largest investment bank in Brazil at the time. The bank was sold in 1999 to Chase Manhattan. Banco Patrimônio was sold in 1999 to the American group JP Morgan Chase.

== Education ==
In 1982, Ribeiro graduated in law from the University of São Paulo and in Economics from Fundação Armando Alvares Penteado. Two years later, he earned a master's degree in law from the University of California - Berkeley.

== Career ==
Jair Ribeiro began his career in 1979 as a lawyer at Pinheiro Neto Advogados, working on mergers and acquisitions.

In 1988, he co-founded a mergers and acquisitions consultancy, Patrimônio, in partnership with US bank Salomon Brothers, one of the largest Wall Street investment banks of its time. Four years after its creation, in 1992, the company obtained its investment banking license. Ribeiro was the institution's CEO and coordinated major operations in the Brazilian capital market, such as the privatization of Telebrás, considered the largest privatization in Brazil, and the first launch of ADRs in the international market (Aracruz S.A.). In 1999, Ribeiro participated in the sale of Banco Patrimônio to Chase Manhattan.

Also in 1999, Ribeiro was appointed president of Banco Chase Manhattan in Brazil, a position that he held until 2000. At the institution, the executive also served as managing director of the international equity area of JP Morgan NY (2000-2003), responsible for the European, Asian, Australian, and Latin American markets.

He was co-founder (2006), CEO (2006-2009), and shareholder of CPM Braxis SA, an IT company sold to the French group Capgemini, in 2010. The company at this time had more than 7,000 employees and sales of over R$1.5 billion, being sold for R$517 million.

From 2005 to 2020, he was a shareholder and member of the board and director of Sertrading SA, one of the largest foreign trade companies in Brazil, participating in the company's growth from approximately R$80 million (2004) to R$7 billion (2020). From 2011 to 2018, he was Co-CEO and shareholder of the control group of Banco Indusval SA, a bank focused on corporate credit and the distribution of securities (through the subsidiary Guide Investimentos), founded in the 60s, whose partners are bankers Brazilians, and the international group Warburg Pincus. During his tenure, Banco Indusval developed Guide Investimentos, a wealth management platform (which sold control in 2018 to the Chinese Fosun Group) and Smartbank S.A., a Brazilian B2B digital banking platform in partnership with The Hive, a Silicon Valley s group.

In the cultural and educational sectors, he was the founder and President of Casa do Saber. Opened in 2004, Casa do Saber is a center for courses and cultural events located in the city of São Paulo.

Ribeiro also works for the improvement of public education, initially founding the Associação Parceiros da Educação, a non-governmental organization (NGO) that structures partnerships between the private sector and public schools in São Paulo and Rio de Janeiro, present in more than 400 state public schools, with a direct impact on approximately 250,000 students. Ribeiro was also a member of the Conselho Estadual da Educação (São Paulo's Board of Education), and a member of the Management Committee of the São Paulo Education Department. and part of the board of Todos pela Educação, a Brazilian public-education advocacy, non-profit organization. In 2008, this project gave Ribeiro the Trip Transformadores award in the Education category. In 2010, he was honored by the Brazil Fund and, in 2018, by the World Fund, both based in New York, for his services to Brazilian public education. He also co-led the construction of the Pact for Racial Equity, which defined a new ESG protocol for Brazilian companies on racial issues.

He holds a degree in law from the University of São Paulo (1982), in Economics from FAAP (1982), and a Master's in Law from the University of California – Berkeley (1984). In the fall of 2019, he served as a visiting scholar at Stanford University School of Education (CA, USA).
