= Transdata =

Brazilian data communication network

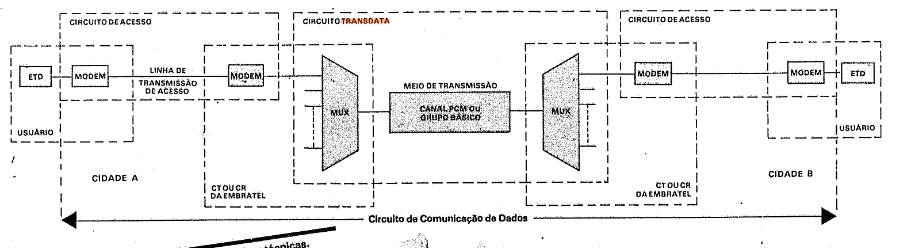
A technical scheme from Embratel for the operation of Transdata

Serviço Digital de Transmissão de Dados Via Terrestre (lit. 'Digital Service of Data Transmission Via Land'), also known as Transdata, was a data communication network first experimentally installed in 1976 by Embratel, then in 1980 officially opened by the Brazilian government and leased by Embratel.

== Description ==
Transdata was a data communication system composed of private point-to-point circuits that provided safe communication, that could be both verbal or digital data. Data was transmitted through telephone lines and microwaves, and later dial-up lines. It was designed to transmit data with higher speed and better quality compared to the telephone. As prices were expensive, it was used by organizations that dealt with large amounts of data, such as companies and governmental organs. Before it was opened, companies in Brazil such as banks, aviation companies and multinational corporations only had access to Telex and telephone networks. Originally, the system operated with 4,042 low-speed circuits.

Usage prices were fixed and were calculated according to the distance between both ends of the line. The rental price was deemed expensive. The most popular connection was between Rio and São Paulo, costing CR$ 420 thousand per month for 2,400 BPS. The most expensive line was Rio and Belém, costing CR$ 610 thousand per month for 300 BPS. The cheapest one was used for a distance of 50 km, costing CR$ 23 thousand per month. In December 1980 clients sent a complaint to the Ministry of Communications, that promised to reduce costs in 13% in the next year. In July 1981 the prices of Rio-São Paulo and Rio-Belém fell to CR$ 200 thousand and CR$ 600 thousand respectively.

In June 1981, Embratel implemented several changes to the system due to requests made by clients, many developed by companies such as Cobra, SID, Edisa, Labo and Sisco. The company has inaugurated a system capable of switching amongst voice and data channels in a single circuit and has announced that it would later be implemented in the user's terminal. A system to charge users that did not buy the 24-hour Transdata operation was also implemented. Multiplexers were also implemented in an attempt to better efficiency and further reduce costs. In June 1987, Embratel announced the installation of more than 12 thousand modems to decongest Transdata's system.

== History ==
The system was operated experimentally by Embratel from 1976, and covered São Paulo and Rio de Janeiro by 1978, running a V.24/V.28 interface with a maximum access rate of 9600 bits per second. At the time, the Brazilian Telecommunications Company Embratel was state-owned and the government had given it a monopoly on telecommunications services. It was developed due to the interest of the military dictatorship in investing in communication systems for strategic purposes.

On 6 May 1980 Transdata was officially inaugurated by the Brazilian government in São Paulo, Rio de Janeiro and Brasília, and leased by Embratel. The inauguration date was chosen due to the 15th anniversary of Embratel and for celebrating the National Communications Day. The ceremony took place in Rio de Janeiro at 2 p.m. The Minister of Communications Haroldo Corrêa de Mattos and the president of Embratel Helvécio Gilson were present during the solemnity. Shortly after, Embratel announced the expansion of the system to other 27 cities. In November, Embratel connected Ribeirão Preto to the system and further announced the expansion of the network to Bauru, Campinas, São José do Rio Preto, Santo André, Osasco and Santos. The system was mostly used by banks, with Itaú being the first client.

The system quickly became popular due its reliability. In 1981, Transdata network reached 450 circuits in 340 cities, with most of them being operated in São Paulo. In 1985, Rio de Janeiro Stock Exchange began transmitting data of publicly traded companies directly to personal computers. In the end of 1985, there were 33 operating centers and 9,854 rented circuits. In 1986, Embratel's president Pedro Jorge Castelo Branco Sampaio announced the investment of about CR$ 1 trillion in data communication to fulfill the demand for Transdata and Rempac services. In 1987, the number of rented circuits raised to 16,169. According to Embratel, they received an average of 300 renting requests a day. The demand was so high that in June Embratel announced the creation of a taskforce to reduce bureaucracy amongst Telebrás and its subsidiaries and the creation of engineering solutions for a faster installation, thus reducing the release of new transmission lines from 6-12 months to 4 months. In 1992, Transdata demand surpassed Telex.

From 1990 on, Transdata lost popularity to Embratel's communication service Renpac, which was faster and designed for general use. Another important factor for the loss of users was the launch in 1987 of High Speed Data Transmission System, that used Brasilsat A1 satellite for data transmission. It was almost six times faster and on its release IBM computers were expected to substitute 80% of their Transdata lines for the new system. In December 1988, three major banks in Brazil, Itaú, Bradesco and Bamerindus, announced the investment in satellite communication to lessen the dependency in other systems, including Transdata. In March 1989, Embratel finalised testing yet another satellite communication method called Multiple Access System Via Satellite (Samsat), which was faster and more confiable than Transdata. In 1995, Transdata's revenue fell by 73% compared to 1990. The service ended somewhere during the 90s. Telebrás, owner of Embratel, was privatized in 1998 and many of its services were terminated.

== System interruptions ==
On 6 March 1986, lightning hit Embratel's retransmitter in Engenheiro Paulo de Frotin. It interrupted several services, including Transdata, ceasing communication between Brazilian states for almost two hours. The problem was fixed at 19h, but communications were unstable up until at least 22h30, and Transdata briefly fell once more for computer transmissions between São Paulo state and Belém at 19h40.

== Analogous systems ==
Victory and Meca Telecomunicações have announced Vicomdata, that transmitted data using frequency modulation waves not used by radio stations. Its release was predicted for March 1989, and it would initially connect Rádio Globo with Rádio Exelsor. The system had more noise than Transdata and only worked on a distance of 140 km from Meca's retransmitter. It was created to provide a communication service without having to wait for the installation of Embratel's system, which could take months.

== Legacy ==
Transdata was the first telecommunication system of South America, and together with Renpac, it has further encouraged the Government to invest in a network system in Brazil.
