= NET (telecommunications) =

Defunct Brazilian telecommunications company

- Type: Private
- Industry: Telecommunications
- Founded: 12 December 1991
- Defunct: 11 July 2019
- Fate: Absorbed into Claro in 2019 and later relaunched into Claro NET in early 2020
- Successor: Claro NET
- Headquarters: São Paulo, Brazil
- Key people: José Félix, (Chairman)
- Products: Cable television, broadband internet, VoIP
- Number of employees: 12,000
- Parent: América Móvil
- Website: net.com.br

NET was a Brazilian telecommunications company that offered services such as cable television, broadband internet and telephony. The company's NET TV service (cable TV) had around 5.4 million subscribers as of Q2 2012. NET also operated the broadband Internet service NET Vírtua, with over 9 million subscribers as of Q2 2019 and telephone over cable (under the NET Fone via Embratel name) with more than 2.5 million subscribers. It is owned by Mexican telecom giant América Móvil. On 11 July 2019, the NET brand was absorbed into the Claro brand, already used by América Móvil for its mobile business in Latin America. In early 2020, the NET brand was relaunched into the Claro NET brand, and was later discontinued in 2022.

In 2011, Claro, Embratel and NET announced the integration of their networks and services. In 2014, Anatel accepted the merger of the three companies, allowing them to use the same corporate name. In January 2015, Claro incorporated the companies Embratel and NET and became a publicly-held company, with the corporate name "Claro S/A", but maintaining the companies' brands.

In July 2019, NET ceased to be an independent brand and became part of Claro's portfolio, giving its name to services aimed at the residential segment.

NET's pay TV, telephony and broadband services were incorporated into Claro's portfolio, consolidating the brand's multi-service offering, which was born in Brazil and is now present in several countries. Stores, websites and applications were also updated to facilitate interaction.

NET's products and services aimed at small and medium-sized companies were consolidated into Embratel's portfolio.

Claro TV was integrated with NET in the pay TV service, thus creating a single service called "Claro NET HD". Later, on 26 May 2022, the service was renamed Claro TV+.

== History ==
Antônio Dias Leite bought some of these companies and founded Multicanal on December 12, 1991. One of his priorities was to get them up and running, with the intention of selling them later. The first purchase was of a small operator in Campo Grande, Mato Grosso do Sul, with around 100 users; the purchase was valued at around US$200,000. At that time, he had assets in TV Alphaville, a company owned by Silvio Santos that operated in the interior of São Paulo, and 80% in the RPC cable TV company in Rio de Janeiro. Therefore, Antônio Leite avoided large centers where Canais Globo (Grupo Globo) and TVA (Grupo Abril) operated. In 1992 and 1993, the company bought seven more operators or operating licenses, of which 6 were in São Paulo and one in Goiás.

The company followed the same lines as the major pay TV companies in the USA, going against its competitors in the country by ceasing to produce and only working with signal distribution. By 1993, the company was already present in several strategic locations and was in talks with its two competitors. In a second negotiation, Globopar (owned by Organizações Globo) and the American company Ralph Partners II obtained 30% of the company. With the entry of the American company, these engineers convinced Brazilians to invest in fiber optic devices and coaxial cables, which were more modern at the time, subsequently obtaining a greater range of services. With this, NET São Paulo was founded as the first multi-operator company in the country.

NET was launched on 12 December 1991 by Brazil's Roberto Marinho family's as part of their Rede Globo empire. In March 2005, Embratel, a subsidiary of Mexico's Telmex, took a controlling stake in NET, paying 570 million reais.

In 1998, NET incorporated a merger with Multicanal, which was completed in the same year. Between 2000 and 2002, it operated under the corporate name Globo Cabo. In 2000, it purchased Vicom, which owned and operated more than 3,000 satellite communication earth stations in Brazil.

The company's shareholders have included BNDESPar, Bradesco, RBS and Microsoft.

In June 2004, América Móvil and Embratel joined NET's shareholder structure, and the company GB Empreendimentos e Participações was founded, formed by Grupo Globo (Globopar, 51% of the shares) and the Mexican group Telmex (49% of the shares), given that the legislation determined that more than half of the shares should remain in the possession of a company with Brazilian capital.

In 2006, Embratel and NET launched a joint pay TV service, broadband Internet connection and fixed telephony (NET Fone/Triple Play).

The company announced in late 2006 that it would buy Vivax, then the nation's second-largest cable company. The transaction was approved in May 2007 and completed in June 2007. Rollout of the NET brand in Vivax areas was completed in December 2007.

On 10 August 2010, NET became the first cable operator in Brazil to offer all the Warner Bros. Discovery in Latin America channels: Discovery Channel, Animal Planet, Discovery Kids, People+Arts, Discovery Travel & Living, Discovery Home & Health, Discovery Science, Discovery Civilization, Discovery Turbo, HD Theater and TLC.

On 28 January 2012, Anatel granted Embratel, a subsidiary of América Móvil, authorization to take control of the company, granting the company the right to purchase the remaining shares belonging to Grupo Globo. At this time, Grupo Globo holds 33.56% of the common shares.

On 5 March 2012, Embratel reported that it had paid R$6.439 million to Globopar for 5.5% of the voting capital of GB Empreendimentos e Participações, the direct controlling shareholder of the pay TV company NET. With the acquisition, Embratel now holds 54.5% of the voting capital and 100% of the preferred shares of GB. As a result of the acquisition, Embrapar and Embratel now hold, directly and indirectly through GB, 92.2% of the total capital of NET, Embratel reported.

In order for Globosat to be certified as an independent programmer, its owner had to sell its shares in pay TV companies, including NET and Sky. After this adjustment, Grupo Globo changed the company's shareholding system, meaning that Globosat was only classified as a national production company.

== NET Vírtua ==
The broadband service currently offers the following speeds: 2 Mbps, 15 Mbps, 35 Mbps, 120 Mbps and 240 Mbps in almost every location from the company's coverage area. Also they offer 500 Mbps based on FTTH in some locations.

=== Coverage ===
Currently, Vírtua is available in many cities of 21 states, like Alagoas, Amazonas, Bahia, Ceará, Espírito Santo, Goiás, Minas Gerais, Maranhão, Mato Grosso, Mato Grosso do Sul, Pernambuco, Pará, Paraíba, Paraná, Piauí, Rio Grande do Norte, Rio Grande do Sul, Santa Catarina, São Paulo and Rio de Janeiro, plus Distrito Federal.

In 2018, they started to cover new cities with FTTH instead of HFC, as of August 2019, there were 51 cities covered with FTTH by Claro NET.

== See also ==
- List of internet service providers in Brazil
