= Brasil Telecom =

Brasil Telecom Participações S.A.
- Type: Sociedade Anônima
- Traded as: B3: BRTO3, BRTO4; NYSE: BTM
- Industry: Telecommunications
- Founded: 1998
- Defunct: January 9, 2009
- Headquarters: Brasília, DF, Brazil
- Key people: Ricardo Knoepfelmacher, (CEO); Marco Schroeder, (CFO); Rafael Cristiano U.J , (COO); Martin Herrera, (CLO/CPO); Suzana Santos, (CMO/CCO)
- Products: Fixed line and mobile telephony, internet services, digital television
- Revenue: ▼US$6.5 billion (2010)
- Net income: ▲US$1.2 billion (2010)
- Number of employees: 20,451
- Parent: Oi
- Subsidiaries: Internet Group
- Website: www.brasiltelecom.com.br

Brasil Telecom S.A. (Brazilian Portuguese pronunciation: [bɾaˈziw teleˈkõw]; BrT) was a major Brazilian telecommunications company headquartered in the Brazilian capital of Brasília. The company was one of three landlines and eight mobile telephone companies – and only long-distance service provider – that emerged in Brazil following the break-up of Telebrás. Originally the company was called Tele Centro Sul, because its service covered the states in the central and southern parts of Brazil, namely Acre, Rondônia, Goiás, Tocantins, Mato Grosso, Mato Grosso do Sul, Paraná, Santa Catarina and Rio Grande do Sul, as well as the Distrito Federal. Since 9 January 2009, the company is a subsidiary of Oi.

== History ==
The Brazilian investment bank Opportunity, which managed funds for investors including Citigroup and some Brazilian pension funds, in partnership with Telecom Italia, paid 2.07 billion reais in June 1998 to buy Tele Centro Sul from the Brazilian government as part of the privatization process of Telebrás. In 2001, the company purchased a small stake in the iBest Co. website and launched a portal and free internet access service; at the time, the Marcos Wettreich was the main shareholder in iBest. After some legal wrangling, Citigroup and the Brazilian pension funds took control of the company, removing Opportunity from the management of their respective funds and took control of the company in 2005. BrT started up a wireless service in 2004.

Brasil Telecom's stock was traded on BM&F Bovespa, where it is part of the Ibovespa index, as well as on the New York Stock Exchange.

In 2008, it was announced that Brasil Telecom would be acquired by Oi. That transaction required changes in legislation, since legislation at the time prohibited a fixed telephone company from purchasing another fixed telephone company in a different license area. That legislation has since changed, and Oi completed its purchase of BrT on January 9, 2009.

== Legal issues ==
Brasil Telecom, the country's third largest fixed-line operator, and Opportunity, which controlled Brasil Telecom, hired Kroll to determine whether Telecom Italia competed with Brasil Telecom in 2000 in the latter's acquisition of the Brazilian fixed-line phone company Companhia Riograndense de Telecomunicoes ('CRT') from Spain's Telefónica with the purpose of increasing the final price paid by Brasil Telecom for CRT, as both Opportunity and Telecom Italia were struggling for the control of Brasil Telecom. Brasil Telecom and Telecom Italia have been locked in court struggles since 2000. Kroll was accused of spying on Brazilian government officials. Additionally, Opportunity also became involved in legal disputes with the investors in its managed funds, namely some Brazilian pension funds and Citigroup, which culminated in Opportunity's removal as the manager of these funds and, ultimately, Opportunity's losing the control of Brasil Telecom (along with other companies controlled by the funds, namely Telemig Celular, Amazonia Celular, Santos Brasil, and Opportrans/Rio de Janeiro's subway operator).

== See also ==
- Atlantica-1
