= Oi FM =

Brazilian radio network

- Type: Broadcast radio network
- Country: Brazil
- Headquarters: Rio de Janeiro, Rio de Janeiro

Programming
- Language(s): Portuguese
- Format: Music; Adult contemporary; Alternative rock

Ownership
- Owner: Oi
- Parent: Grupo Bel

History
- Launch date: January 6, 2005
- Closed: 2018
- Replaced by: Rede Verão; Bradesco Esportes FM

Oi FM was a Brazilian radio network, later a web radio station, developed by the telecommunications company Oi. Developed in 2004, it was launched in 2005 in partnership with Grupo Bel, a media conglomerate based in Belo Horizonte, Minas Gerais, where the first branch of the radio network was inaugurated.

Oi FM is considered one of the first "customized radios" in Brazil, in a model similar to the naming rights format, where all its programming was based on Oi's products, especially the promotion of the mobile operation service. With a focus on a young/adult contemporary audience, the radio had a strong investment in interactivity combined with the use of social networks, SMS and Oi's integrated services, themed podcasts about music and pop culture, as well as music programming focused on alternative styles, such as pop, rock, indie and MPB (with a greater focus on new artists in this segment).

The partnership with Grupo Bel generated a radio network with 11 stations in the cities of Uberlândia, Vitória, Fortaleza, Santos, São Paulo, Rio de Janeiro, Ribeirão Preto, Recife, Campinas and Porto Alegre. In 2012, the entire network of radio stations and the agreement with Grupo Bel was terminated and Oi FM became a web radio station, due to consecutive reductions in funding for the station's operation, as well as poor returns from the subsidiaries. The project ended completely in 2018.

== History ==
Developed in 2004, Oi FM was launched on the market on January 6, 2005, with the launch of its branch in Belo Horizonte, marking the beginning of the partnership between the telecommunications company Oi and the media conglomerate Grupo Bel to manage the radio network. In the same year, it launched stations in Vitória, Fortaleza and Recife. In 2006, it launched its branch in Rio de Janeiro. Between 2008 and 2009, it went on air in the cities of Santos, São Paulo, Ribeirão Preto, Campinas and Porto Alegre.

In 2009, Oi FM ceased broadcasting in Uberlândia as it did not achieve the results expected by the telephone company. In May 2010, the broadcaster began shutting down branches of its network after Oi reduced its funding for network maintenance. During this period, the branches in Santos, Vitória and Fortaleza were shut down. In December 2011, the end of Oi's agreement with Grupo Bel to operate the radio network was confirmed, with its last day on the air on December 31. As of January 1, 2012, Oi FM became a web radio station and the stations that made up its network began broadcasting provisional programming called Rede Verão. Flávio Carneiro, manager of Grupo Bel, said that the end of the partnership was a predictable move: "Like any marketing action, it had a start date and there was a natural moment to migrate to a digital platform."

As a web radio station, Oi FM kept the same music programming, focusing on alternative international hits and new Brazilian music, and introduced a team of columnists and content curators in December 2012. It brought back programs from the dial era, with Maurício Valladares' Ronca Ronca, and debuted others, with Marcelo Costa's Confraria Scream & Yell.

In September 2013, Oi FM underwent a new overhaul, renewing its team of columnists and introducing interactive radio. In this new format, listeners who register on the Oi FM website answer a questionnaire and can say whether or not they like the music they are listening to. With this information, the system applies the user's preference to the radio and the programming becomes exclusive to each listener. At the time, the schedule consisted of the programs Ronca Ronca (with Maurício Valladares), Com a Boca no Mundo (with Marcus Preto), Supernova (with Yugo), Independência (with China), Conexões (with Marcelo Ferla), Show do Jogo (with Marcelo Ferla), GPS (with Renata Simões), Plugado (with Rafael Silva), Na Tela (with Matheus Souza), Chá das Cinco, Café com Bolachas, Às Vezes Eles Voltam, A Todo Volume, Rebobine, Por Favor and Fique Ligado.

Over time, only the customized music programming project remained on the Oi FM portal. In 2018, the web radio was deactivated.

== Stations ==
Broadcasters that were part of the network project with Grupo Bel and their successors after the closure of their activities:

Call sign	Frequency	Headquarters / City of license	Later situation	Transmission period
ZYD 629	90.3 MHz	Porto Alegre / Ivoti	The broadcaster continued with Rede Verão.	2009–2011
ZYV 447	94.1 MHz	Belo Horizonte / Brumadinho	The broadcaster continued with Rede Verão.	2005–2011
ZYD 964	94.1 MHz	Campinas / Vinhedo	The broadcaster continued with Rede Verão.	2009–2011
ZYT 798	97.1 MHz	Recife / Paudalho	The broadcaster continued with Rede Verão.	2005–2011
ZYD 904	94.1 MHz	Ribeirão Preto	The broadcaster continued with Rede Verão.	2008–2011
ZYD 462	102.9 MHz	Rio de Janeiro / Niterói	The broadcaster continued with Rede Verão.	2006–2011
ZYU 650	94.1 MHz	São Paulo	The broadcaster continued with Rede Verão.	2008–2011
ZYM 701	102.1 MHz	Santos / Peruíbe	Extinct	2008–2010
ZYC 412	101.7 MHz	Fortaleza	Replaced by Beach Park FM.	2005–2010
ZYC 530	105.7 MHz	Vitória / Domingos Martins	Replaced by Beleza FM.	2005–2010
ZYC 691	101.9 MHz	Uberlândia	Replaced by Extra FM.	2005–2009

=== Rede Verão ===
Between January and May 2012, Grupo Bel operated a provisional radio network called Rede Verão, while it looked for a new partner to make it viable. The programming was essentially musical and identical to that of Oi FM. At the end of February 2012, a partnership was confirmed between Grupo Bandeirantes de Comunicação and Grupo Bel to operate a new sports radio network. Soon after, the two groups signed a master sponsorship agreement with Bradesco bank, which led to the launch of Bradesco Esportes FM radio.

Below is a list of the Rede Verão stations until the launch of Bradesco Esportes FM. Some stations, which were operated by third parties in cooperation with Grupo Bel, chose to pursue other projects before the launch of the new network.

Call sign	Frequency	Headquarters / City of license	Later situation
ZYD 629	90.3 MHz	Porto Alegre / Ivoti	The broadcaster continued with Bradesco Esportes FM.
ZYV 447	94.1 MHz	Belo Horizonte / Brumadinho	The broadcaster continued with Bradesco Esportes FM.
ZYU 650	94.1 MHz	São Paulo	The broadcaster continued with Bradesco Esportes FM.
ZYD 964	94.1 MHz	Campinas / Vinhedo	Replaced by Planalto FM (Rede Aleluia).
ZYT 798	97.1 MHz	Recife / Paudalho	Replaced by Globo FM.
ZYD 904	94.1 MHz	Ribeirão Preto	Replaced by Melody FM.
ZYD 462	102.9 MHz	Rio de Janeiro / Niterói	Replaced by Jovem Pan FM Rio de Janeiro, affiliated with Jovem Pan FM.
