= Oi (telecommunications) =

Brazilian telecommunication company

Oi S.A.
- Type: Sociedade Anônima
- Traded as: B3: OIBR3, OIBR4
- Industry: Telecommunications
- Founded: 1998; 28 years ago
- Defunct: August 25, 2026
- Fate: Declared bankrupt by judge
- Headquarters: Rio de Janeiro, Brazil
- Key people: Eurico Teles (CEO)
- Products: Fixed line & mobile phone internet services Pay television
- Revenue: ▼R$9.28 billion (2020)
- Net income: ▼R$−10.53 billion (2020)
- Number of employees: 18947
- Website: Official Website (English)

Oi (IPA: [ˈoj], Portuguese for "Hi"), formerly known as Telemar, was the largest fixed telephone operator and the fourth mobile telephone operator in Brazil, being the third largest telecommunication company in Latin America. It is headquartered in Rio de Janeiro.

In 2013, Oi announced its merger with Portugal Telecom, the largest telecommunication company in Portugal. In June 2015, Portugal Telecom was acquired by Altice Group.

On June 20, 2016, Oi filed for a US$19 billion (R$65 billion) bankruptcy protection, the largest on record for Brazil.

On August 25, 2026, Oi was officially declared as bankrupt, almost one year after its initial bankruptcy declaration, on November 10, 2025.

== History ==
Telemar logo, 1999–2007

Oi (then known as Telemar) was formed as Tele Norte Leste to merge sixteen state-owned incumbent local exchange carriers, during the privatization of Brazilian telecommunications system. Each carrier served a particular Brazilian state in the northern, northeastern and southeastern part of the country. In the break-up of Telebras in 1998 it was sold to a consortium led by the Brazilian construction firm Andrade Gutierrez (21.2%) and Inepar Holdings (20%) as well as other Brazilian corporate and individual investors. The consortium paid 3.434 billion reais.

The states that formed the base of Telemar at its inception were Rio de Janeiro, Minas Gerais, Espírito Santo, Bahia, Sergipe, Alagoas, Pernambuco, Paraíba, Rio Grande do Norte, Piauí, Ceará, Maranhão, Pará, Amazonas, Amapá and Roraima, corresponding to 65% of the Brazilian territory and 20 million households.

Initially, Telemar was allowed to offer only local voice and data services and interstate long-distance voice services. Today, Telemar and its subsidiaries offer local, long-distance and international voice and data services, besides a growing mobile phone network.

In April 2006, it was announced that Telemar would restructure itself, merging its three holding companies into a single company, that would have been named either Telemar Participações S.A. or Oi Participações S.A. However, those plans failed, since there was no consensus between Telemar shareholders. But on March 1, 2007, Telemar rebranded itself to "Oi", unifying all of its companies and services under the Oi umbrella. The company is still legally known as "Telemar Norte Leste S.A.", "Tele Norte Leste Participações S.A." and "Telemar Participações S.A.". Oi owns the brands:

- Oi Fixo (landline service, formerly Telefone Telemar)
- Oi Móvel (mobile service, cornerstone of the Oi brand)
- Oi Velox (ADSL, 3G formerly Velox)
- Oi Internet (ISP)
- 31 (long-distance and international calling)
- Oi Wi-Fi (Wi-Fi access, at home or via hotspots)
- Oi TV (DTH pay TV)
- Oi Voip (Voice over IP)

In 2010, Portugal Telecom acquired 22.4% of Oi shares.

In 2013, Oi announced its merger with Portugal Telecom, the largest telecommunication company in Portugal, in order to strengthen the Brazilian firm and simplify its ownership structure. The acquisition of Portugal Telecom was troubled; an issue with Portugal Telecom's financial cash flow was discovered in 2014, leaving Oi without additional capital. Main shareholder of the merged companies, Rioforte, ended up not paying the agreed amount of $1.2 billion dollars that should have been paid to Portugal Telecom in order to pay bonds. As a result, Oi had to default after the merger and reduce the participation of the company's former shareholders. Telemar Participações was incorporated by Oi, simplifying the corporate structure and terminating the shareholders' agreement.

In February 2014, Oi announced it would raise $5.9 billion in a share offering as part of the firm's merger process with Portugal Telecom.

In June 2015, Portugal Telecom was acquired by Altice Group.

In March 2017, Oi had 63 million revenue generating units (UGRs), including 40 million for personal mobile service, 16.3 million for landline, 6.5 million for B2B (large corporations and microentrepreneurs).

In March 2019, Oi reported a fourth-quarter net loss of 3.359 billion reais ($858 million), widening 66 percent from its year-earlier loss. Total revenue fell 7.9 percent.

In December 2020, a consortium formed by Vivo, TIM e Claro purchased the mobile assets for R$16.5 billion.

In October 2021, Oi delisted its ADRs from the New York Stock Exchange.

On January 31, 2022, ANATEL (National Telecommunications Agency) approved the sale of the company. CADE (Administrative Council for Economic Defense) approved the purchase with reservations on January 9 of the same year.

On February 8, 2023, Oi once again filed for Chapter 15 bankruptcy in the United States. In 2025, Oi was declared bankrupt and was ordered to liquidate all of its assets. The company had approximately €5.7 billion ($6.6 billion USD) in unpaid debt by the second quarter of 2025.

On August 25, 2026, Oi was declared bankrupt for the second time, by the Justice of Rio de Janeiro.

== Subsidiaries ==
=== Oi Móvel ===
Oi launched its mobile network in 2002 in its license states. It was the first network using GSM in Brazil. Oi has the practice of not calling its phones "cell phones", but rather "Ois". In 2007, Oi started selling only unlocked handsets, focusing on SIM card and plan sales. In October 2007, Oi acquired a license to operate with GSM in São Paulo, where the network went live on October 24, 2008. In December 2007, Oi purchased licenses to operate a 3G network in its area, including São Paulo, but with the exception of the Franca area. That network is expected to go live in 2009. Also in December 2007, Oi announced its purchase of Amazônia Celular, which was a condition of the sale of its sister company, Telemig Celular, to Vivo.

=== Oi Internet ===
Oi Internet is an ISP that was launched in 2004. Oi Internet started services with a promotion that offered 31% off the dial-up connection costs on the subscriber's bill. However, Anatel, the Brazilian telecom regulator, did not allow this practice. Later, the ISP relaunched the promotion, offering 31% of the dial-up connection costs deposited in the subscriber's bank account or twice of that on a prepaid Oi phone. The Oi Internet dial-up dialer can send SMS messages to Oi phones.

In early 2005, Oi Internet launched its broadband services, initially available only for Oi's Oi Velox DSL subscribers, but now also available for Brasil Telecom Turbo and Telefónica Speedy subscribers.

=== Brasil Telecom purchase ===
In 2008, Oi announced it would purchase Brasil Telecom, creating a major Brazilian telecommunications company, already nicknamed "Supertele" or "SuperOi". That takeover required changes in legislation, which at the time prohibited a fixed telephone company from purchasing another fixed telephone company in a different license area. That legislation has changed since, and Oi completed its purchase of Brasil Telecom on January 9, 2009. Rollout of the Oi brand in the Brasil Telecom area starts with prepaid mobile service on May 17, 2009.

== Criticism ==
Oi has been criticized and fined by Anatel due to not being able to meet quality goals in their mobile phone service; they have also been criticized for poor customer service.

== Sponsorships ==
- Brazilian Olympic Committee
- Sandro Dias
- São Paulo Fashion Week (Spring/Summer 2009 edition)
- Fashion Rio - Rio Fashion Week
- 2007 Pan American Games, held in Rio de Janeiro
- Oi Casa Grande - teatro no Rio de Janeiro
- Oi FM - online radio station
- Oi Fashion Rocks Brasil 2009, 2010
- X Games Brasil
- 2014 FIFA World Cup Brazil

== Slogans ==
- 2002–2013: Simples assim. ("It's that simple.")
- 2013–2015: A Oi completa você. ("Oi completes you.")
- 2015–2016: Porque o seu mundo não para. ("Because your world doesn't stop.")
- 2016–2026: Junto é bem melhor. ("Together, it's much better.")

== See also ==
- List of mobile network operators of the Americas
- List of telecommunications regulatory bodies
- Telecommunications in Brazil
  - List of internet service providers in Brazil
