= Embratel =

Brazilian telecommunications company

Embratel Participações SA
- Final logo used from 2007 to 2015 and until 2025 as a brand
- Formerly: Empresa Brasileira de Telecomunicações SA (1965-1998)
- Type: Subsidiary
- Industry: Telecommunications
- Founded: 16 September 1965; 61 years ago (demerger from Telebrás)
- Defunct: April 2025; 1 year ago
- Fate: Absorbed into Claro Empresas
- Successor: Claro Brasil (since 2015)
- Headquarters: Rio de Janeiro, Brazil
- Key people: José Formoso Martínez (chairman)
- Products: Fixed & Mobile telecommunications Internet services Cable television
- Revenue: ▲US$ 9.0 billion (2013)
- Net income: ▼US$ 180.0 million (2013)
- Number of employees: 12,000
- Parent: Claro
- Subsidiaries: Embratel Star One
- Website: embratel.com.br

Empresa Brasileira de Telecomunicações, known simply as Embratel, was a major Brazilian telecommunications company headquartered in Rio de Janeiro. Originally the long distance arm of Telebras, the company was owned by American firm MCI Communications for 2.65 billion reais between Telebras' 1998 break-up and MCI's 2003 dissolution, at which point Mexican telecom giant América Móvil stepped in and renamed it Claro Brasil in 2015.

Embratel is a major player in both voice and data communication in Brazil. The company owns a fully digitized microwave communications and fiber optic networks as well as eight domestic communication satellites. The company is a member of the Intelsat and Inmarsat organizations and it owns four fiber optics submarine cable systems - UNISUR, Americas II, Atlantis-2 and Columbus III. The company was responsible for South America's first telecommunication system, Transdata.

In 2008, Embratel launched its pay TV service. It was named Via Embratel and operates in Ku Band on satellite Star One C2. The service is currently branded Claro TV+ DTH.

Embratel was a sponsor of Bruno Senna and Thomaz Bellucci. Some of the company's equipment is represented on the coat of arms of Tanguá, Brazil.

== See also ==
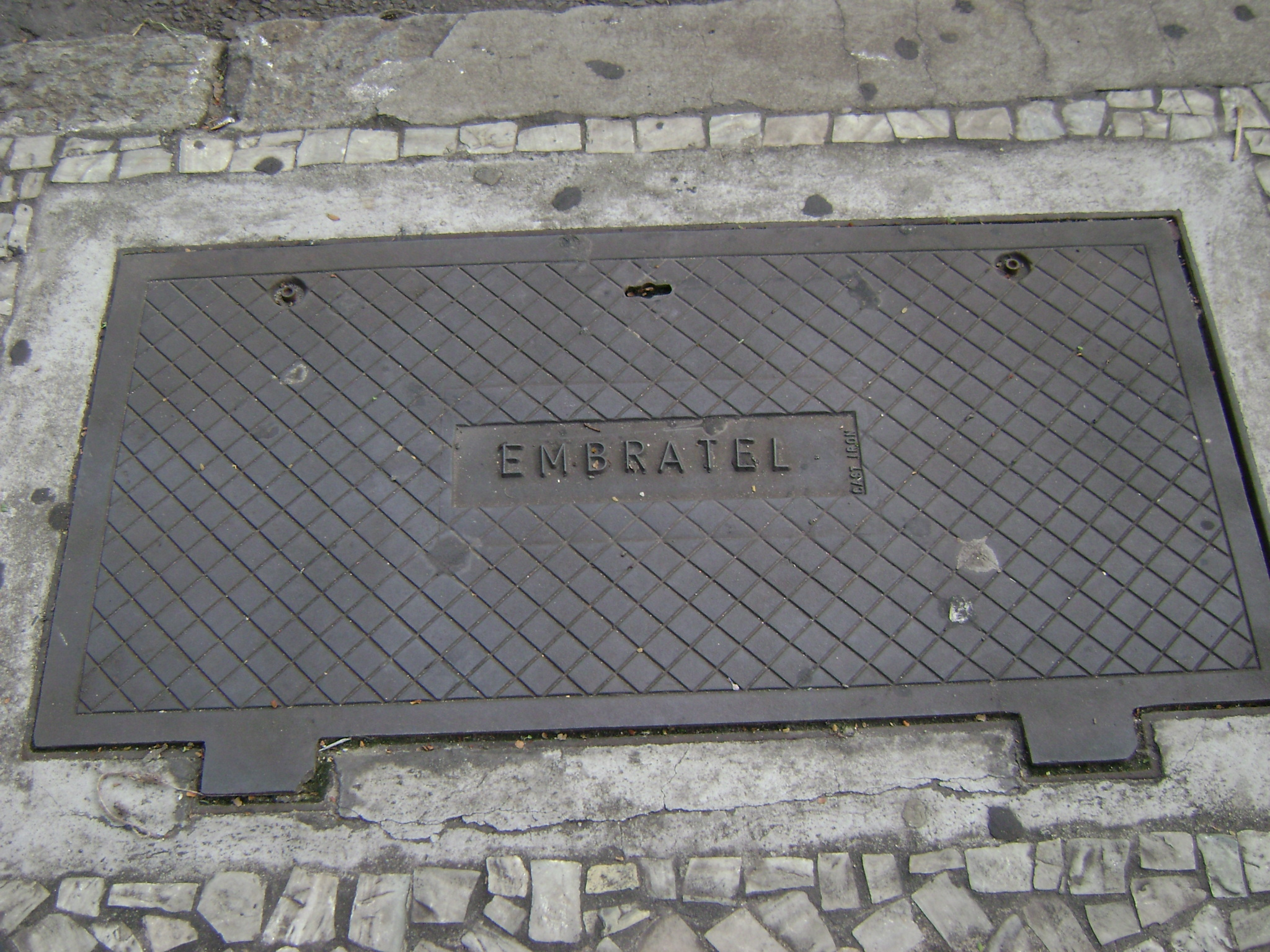
Manhole of Embratel in Belo Horizonte.

- Embratel Star One
- List of internet service providers in Brazil
