= Beach Park (water park) =

Waterpark in Fortaleza, Brazil

Coordinates: 3°50′40″S 38°23′26″W

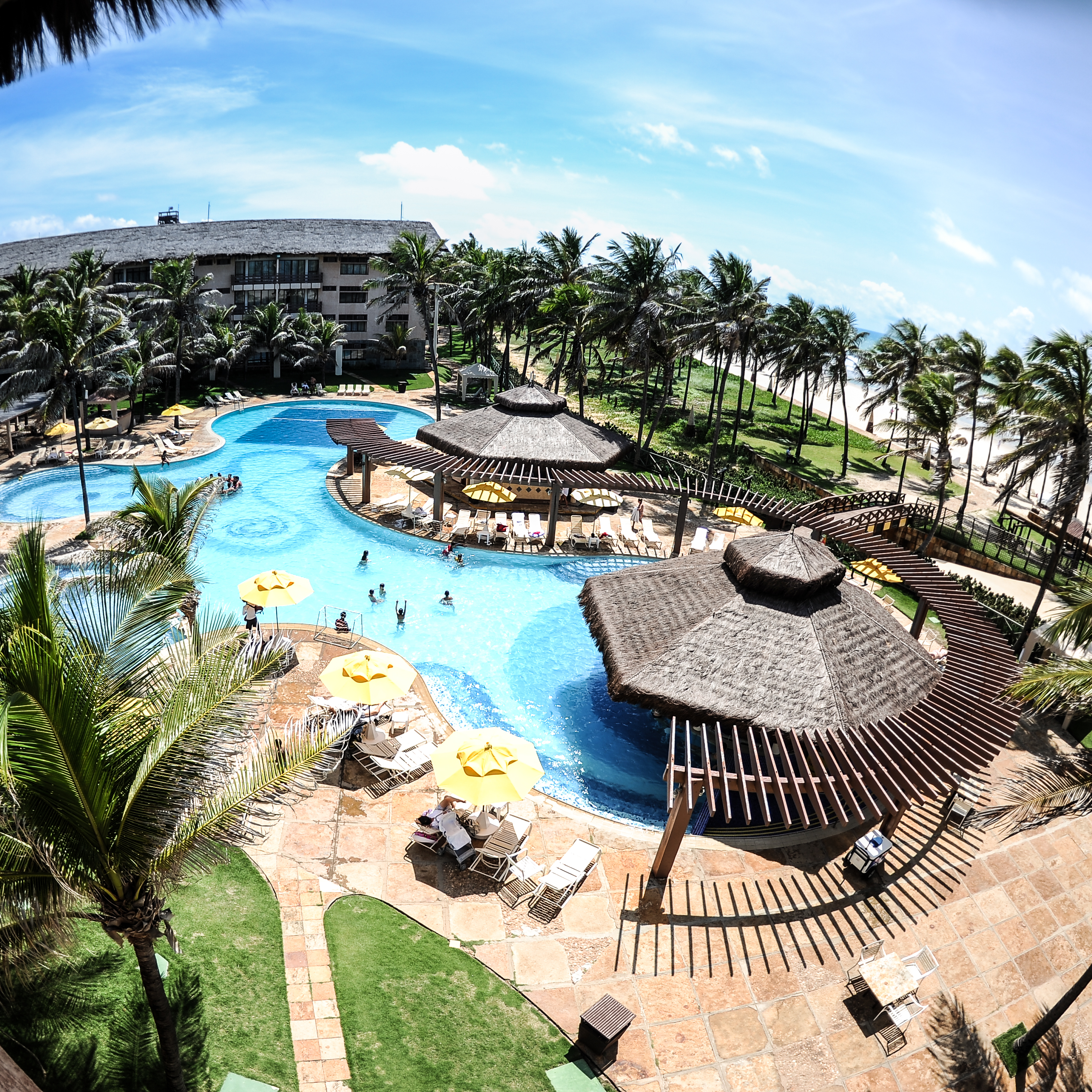
Suites Beach Park Resort

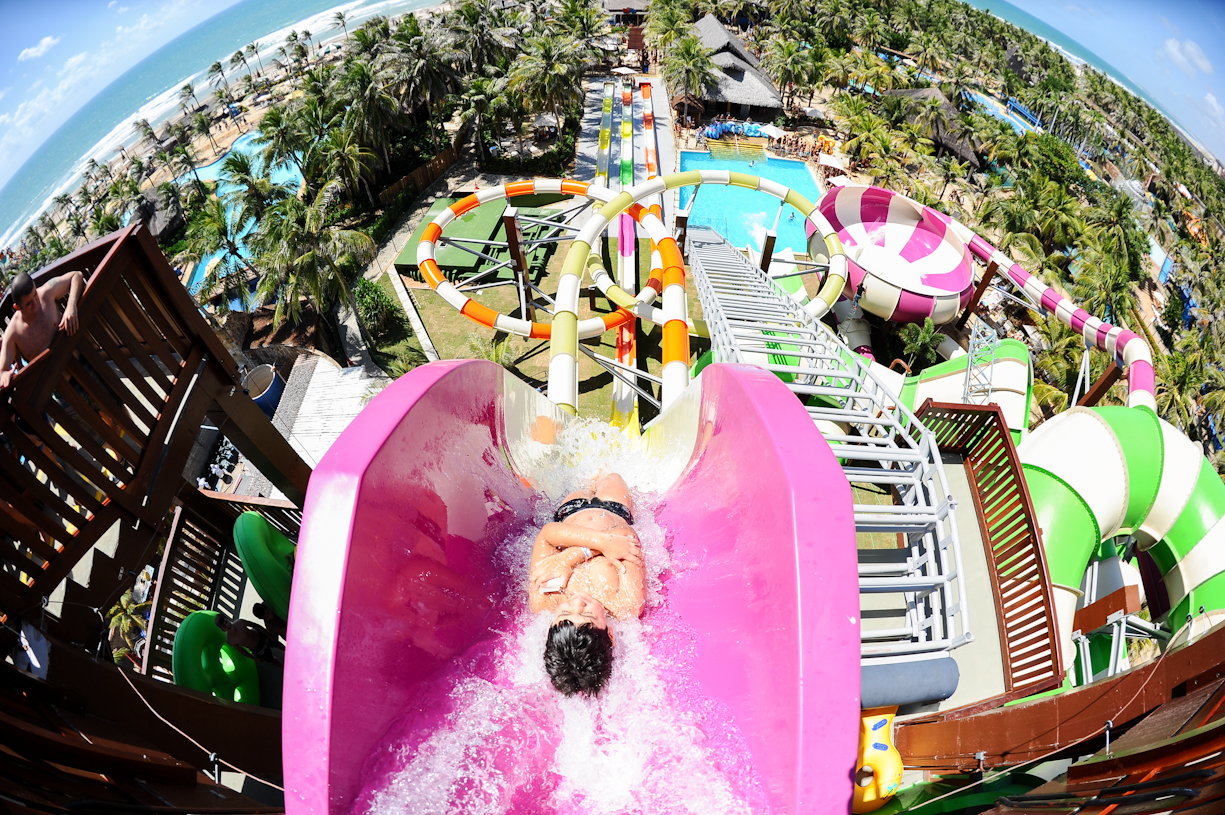
Arrepius

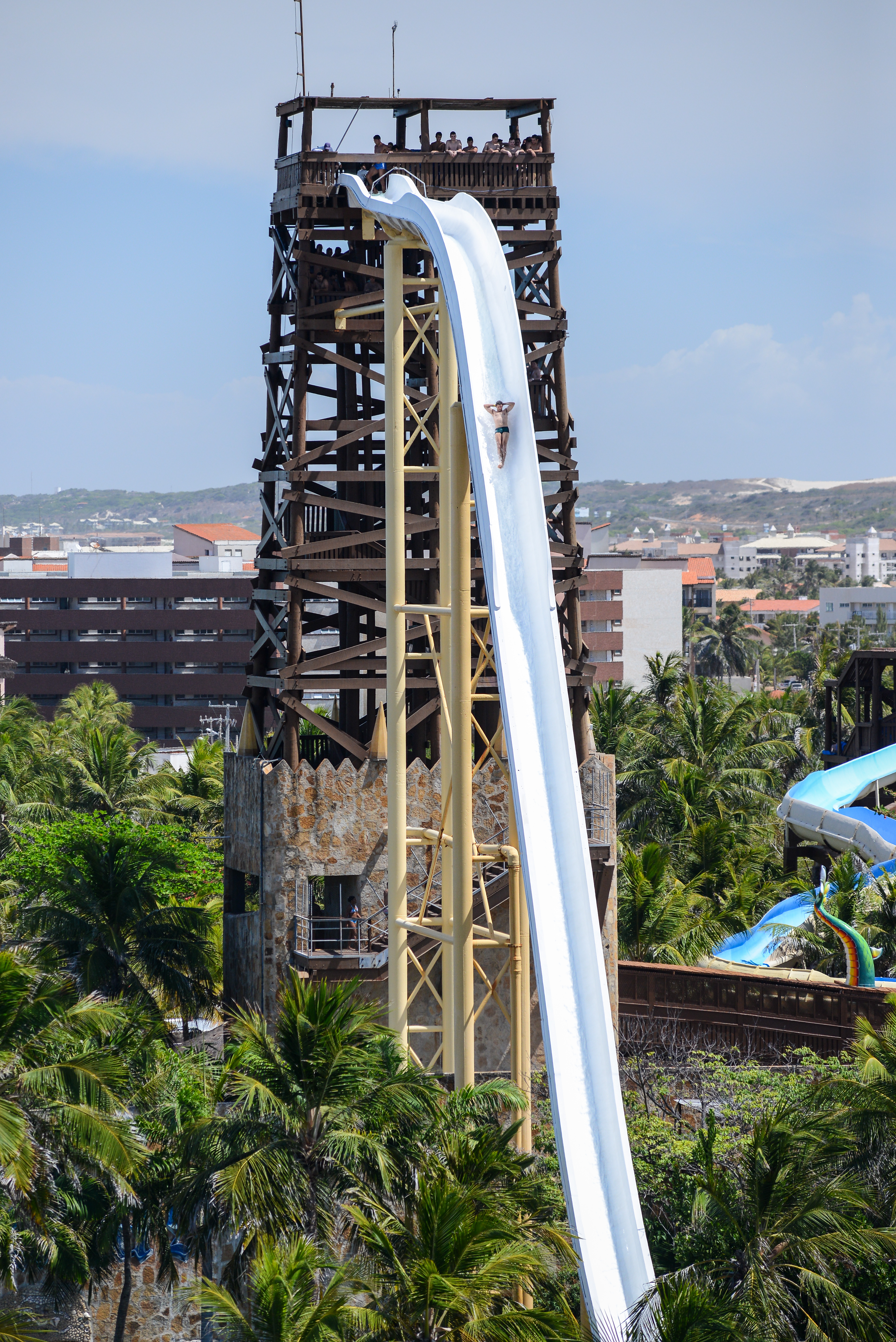
Water slide Insano.

Beach Park is a Brazilian water park and resort, located at the beach of Porto das Dunas in Aquiraz, 15 minutes away from Fortaleza. Spread out across an area of 170,000 m^{2} (approximately 1.8 million ft^{2}), its aquatic park consists of 35,000 m^{2} (376,700 ft^{2}). Beach Park receives over 1.7 million visitors annually and was elected the second best water park in the world in 2014.

The Beach Park complex is composed of the water park, a beach, and the resort.

Beach Park is affiliated with several national and international water parks, theme parks, tourism and entertainment associations. It is a member of the World Waterpark Association (WWA), the International Association of Amusement Parks and Attractions (IAAPA), the Brazilian Association of Restaurants and Entertainment Companies (ABRASEL), the Brazilian Association of the Hospitality Industry (ABIH), and the Aquiraz Convention & Visitors Bureau (ACVB).

Beach Park was one of the filming locations for the film O Noviço Rebelde (Brazilian adaptation of The Sound of Music).

== Accommodations ==
- Beach Park Suites Resort offers 182 seaside apartments.
- Oceani Beach Park Resort, located alongside the beach of Porto das Dunas, has 131 rooms.
- Beach Park Aqua Resort offers tennis and multi-purpose sports courts, a fitness center, kid's club, restaurant, pool bar and infinity pool.
- Beach Park Wellness Resort has 90 rooms designed for families.

== Extreme attractions ==
Constructed in 1997, the Insano previously held the Guinness world record for "World's Tallest Water Slide" at 135-feet tall. The slide held that record until the construction of Kilimanjaro at Aldeia das Águas Park Resort (formerly Águas Quentes Country Club) in Barra do Piraí, Rio de Janeiro, at 193 feet tall.

Arrepius, is a collection of ProSlide water slides with five different slides that occupy an area of approximately 7,000 m^{2} (5347.37 ft^{2}). Its star attraction is The Skybox, a transparent capsule-type slide standing 25 meters tall.

Another notable attraction is the Vaikuntudo. Also a ProSlide attraction, it’s one of the largest funnel water slides in the world.

== Travel awards ==
2011

- "Best E-mail Campaign" - (WWA)
- " Best TV Commercial" - (WWA)

2012

- "Best Print Media"- (WWA)

2013

- "Best YouTube Campaign" - (WWA)
- "Best Radio Commercial"- (WWA)
- "Best Print Media"- (WWA)

Additional honors include:

- Quality WWA- (WWA)
- Industry Leadership WWA- (WWA)
- Best Park in the Country- (O Estado Newspaper)
- Best Theme Park- (Viagem e Turismo Magazine)
