= UNISUR =

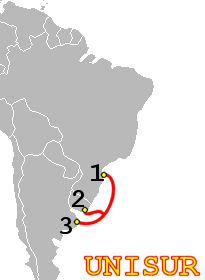

UNISUR is an optical submarine telecommunications cable system in the South Atlantic Ocean linking Argentina, Uruguay, and Brazil.

It has landing points in:

1. Florianópolis, Santa Catarina State, Brazil
2. Maldonado, Maldonado Department, Uruguay
3. Las Toninas, Buenos Aires Province, Argentina

It has a design transmission capacity of 560 Mbit/s and a total cable length of 1,720 km. It started operation on 16 November 1994.
