= Claro Brasil =

Brazilian telecommunications company

Claro S.A.
- Company type: Subsidiary
- Industry: Telecommunications
- Founded: 2003; 23 years ago
- Headquarters: São Paulo, Brazil
- Area served: Brazil
- Products: Mobile telephony Landline; Broadband; Internet services Satellite television
- Parent: América Móvil
- Website: www.claro.com.br

Claro Brasil is a mobile, satellite-television, fixed, and broadband telecommunications operator in Brazil. It was created in 2003 as a result of the union of six regional operators: Americel, ATL, BCP Telecomunicações, Claro Digital, & Tess Celular.

== History ==
In September 2003, it was announced the consolidation of all these operators under a single brand, Claro. Controlled by América Móvil, the mobile company adopted the Claro brand in 16 other Latin American countries: Argentina, Uruguay, Paraguay, Chile, Costa Rica, Ecuador, El Salvador, Honduras, Nicaragua, Guatemala, Panama, Peru, Puerto Rico, the Dominican Republic and Colombia.

In September 2022, telecom regulator Anatel ruled that Claro must build over 700 km of fiber backhaul networks, with a minimum capacity of 10 Gbit/s, as compensation for the acquisitions of Nextel and Primesys.

In October 2022, Claro signed a deal with SES S.A. to enable the delivery of enhanced 4G/5G-ready services to over 260,000 inhabitants in the Amazon region.

In August 2023, Claro launched Internet Movel 5G+, its first residential internet plan using the 5G mobile network as FWA. Its service offers speeds up to 1 Gbps.
