= Telebrás =

Brazilian telecommunications company

Telecomunicações Brasileiras S.A. (Telebras)
- Type: Public
- Traded as: B3: TELB3, TELB4
- Industry: Telecommunications
- Predecessor: Companhia Telefônica Brasileira
- Founded: November 9, 1972; 53 years ago in Brasília, Brazil
- Headquarters: Brasília, Federal District, Brazil
- Key people: Maximiliano Salvadori Martinhão, (President)
- Products: Fixed line & mobile phone internet services
- Parent: Government of Brazil
- Subsidiaries: Visiona (49% ownership)
- Website: www.telebras.com.br

Telebras is a Brazilian telecommunications company which was the state-owned monopoly telephone system. It was broken up in July 1998 into twelve separate companies, nicknamed the 'Baby Bras' companies, that were auctioned to private bidders. The new companies were the long distance operator Embratel, three fixed line regional telephony companies and eight cellular companies. It was re-established in 2010 according to Decree No. 7.175 that established the National Broadband Plan (PNBL), when then-President Luiz Inácio Lula da Silva tasked it with managing a nationwide plan to expand broadband Internet access. Telebras implements the private communication network of the federal public administration, public policy support and supports broadband, besides providing infrastructure and support networks to telecommunications services provided by private companies, states, Federal District, municipalities and nonprofits.

== History ==
Attempts at privatization began during Fernando Collor de Mello's administration in 1990, as part of an economic reform dubbed National Privatization Program (Portuguese: Programa Nacional de Desestatização), within the Plano Collor, which was conducted by then-finance minister Zélia Cardoso de Mello The privatization was carried out some 8 years later during the administration of Fernando Henrique Cardoso, on July 29, 1998. Shares of the 12 "Baby Brás" began trading on the Brazilian stock exchange on September 21, 1998; and US-based trading of American Depository Receipts began on November 16 of the same year.

According to Carlos Henrique Moreira (president of Embratel), in the eight years after the privatization, from 1998 to 2006, the fixed and mobile telephone subscriber base increased by 27.4 million to 139 million, at an annual rate of 20%, generating an annual increase of income of 18%, from R$31 billion to R$121 billion). The government's tax revenue grew from R$9.3 billion to R$33.1 billion at an annual growth rate of 17%. The telecommunication services' penetration grew from 24% to 72%, or 17% annually. The number of direct jobs for the "Baby Brás" companies increased from 180,000 to 305,000, an annual increase of 7%." In the early days of the state-owned operation, some employees were auctioning off telephone lines in a scheme to pocket more cash from the highest bidders.

=== Re-establishment ===
With an investment of 200 million reais in late 2007 by the Federal Government, Telebras became the holding company of Fust resources and aims to be the administrator of a large network of optical fiber already deployed in the towers still owned by Eletrobrás and fiber optical networks that belong to Petrobras. The company is building a large national information highway that will serve the more remote locations of the country with digital inclusion to the populations served by public schools, public administrations, among others, in addition to providing (wholesale) interconnection providers of last mile. The project suffered resistance by sectors of society who see in this maneuver a possible re-nationalization of the sector.
