= Estelle Brachlianoff =

French engineer and business executive

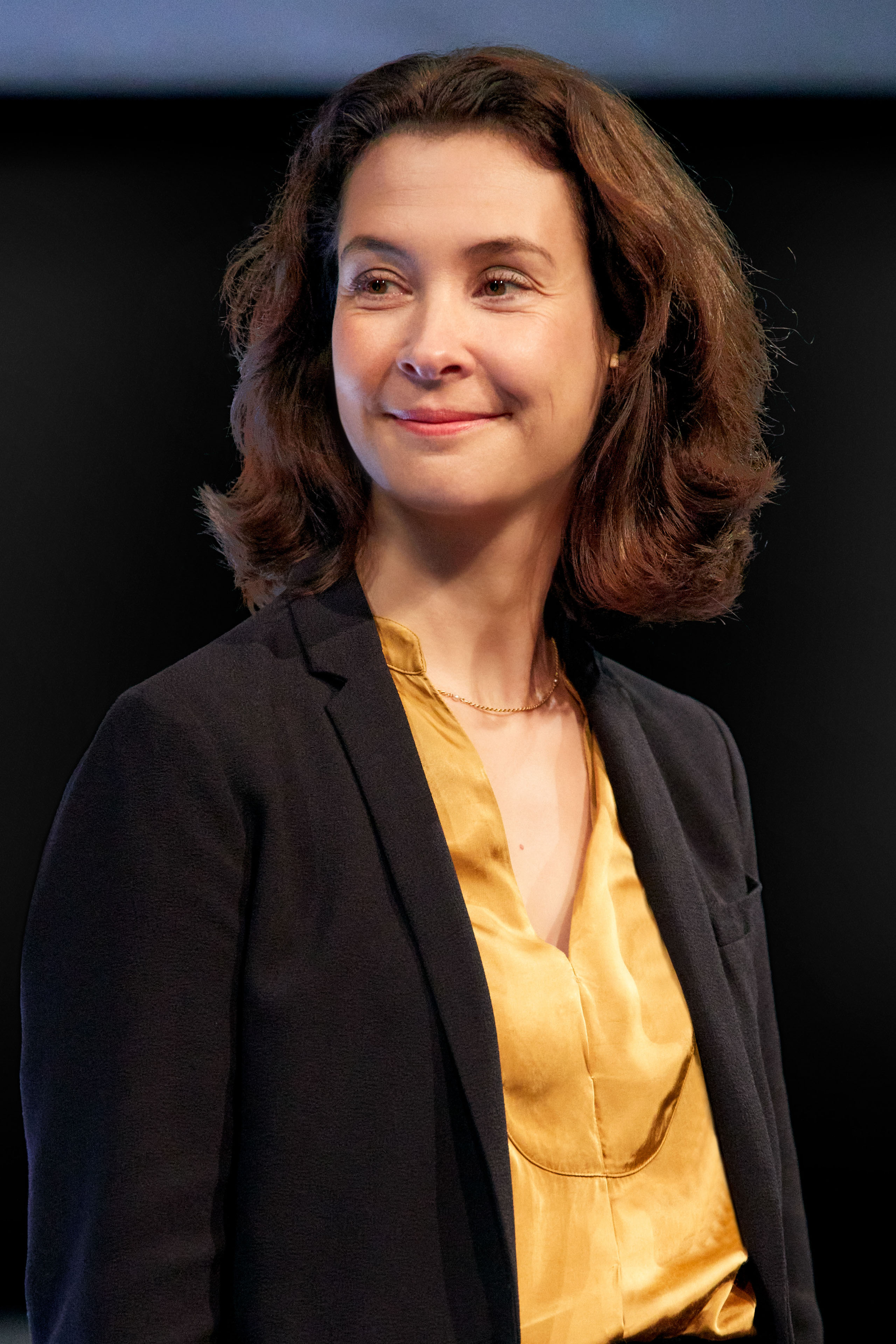
- Estelle Brachlianoff, CEO of Veolia
- Born: 26 July 1972 (age 54); Neuilly-sur-Seine, France
- Education: École Polytechnique; École nationale des ponts et chaussées
- Occupations: CEO, Veolia
- Employer: Veolia
- Children: A son & a daughter

Estelle Brachlianoff (born 26 July 1972) is a French businesswoman and has been the chief executive officer (CEO) of Veolia since 1 July 2022. She is an engineer.

== Early life and education ==
Estelle Brachlianoff was born in Neuilly-sur-Seine, France, to a Bulgarian father and a French mother. Her mother, an engineer at Aérospatiale (which later became Airbus Group), instilled in her the belief that she should choose her own path and pursue her ambitions. As a child, she dreamt of becoming an astronaut or an astrophysicist.

After completing her preparatory classes for higher education, she gained admission to École polytechnique in 1992. She continued her studies at École nationale des ponts et chaussées, earning her bachelor's degree in Civil Engineering & Public Management in 1997.

== Career ==
Estelle Brachlianoff started her career in 1998 as the head of the Val-d'Oise department, where she worked on infrastructure projects, within the Val-d’Oise region of Greater Paris. In 2002, she was appointed as a special advisor for the Greater Paris Île-de-France Prefecture, and was in charge of public transportation and urban planning.

In 2005, she joined Veolia Environmental Services in the waste solutions department as an advisor to the CEO. She served as the CEO of Veolia Environmental Services Cleaning and Multiservices from 2007, and CEO of Veolia Environmental Services Greater Paris region from 2010 to 2012. In 2012, Brachlianoff moved to the United Kingdom to lead as the CEO of Veolia Environmental Services, UK region. In 2013, she was appointed as the CEO of the UK and Ireland zone, and to the management and executive committees.

In September 2018, she became COO of Veolia, and a member of the group’s management and executive committees. On 10 January 2022, she was appointed Chief Executive Officer of Veolia, succeeding Antoine Frérot. She took charge of her CEO duties on 1 July 2022. During that time, Brachlianoff was only the third female at the helm of a Paris CAC 40 company, following Engie's Catherine MacGregor, and Christel Heydemann of Orange S.A.

She is an ardent proponent of the concepts, "circular economy" and "ecological transformation".

== Other appointments ==
- President of the French Chamber of Great Britain, June 2016 to July 2018
- Non-Executive Director of Zodiac Aerospace, January 2016 - February 2018
- Non-Executive Director of Hermès, May 2019 – present
- Vice-Chairwoman of the French association of Enterprises for the Environment (EPE), 2022–present

== Awards and recognitions ==
- She was awarded the Knight of the National Order of Merit in 2014
- She was awarded the "Chevalier de la Légion d'Honneur" (Knight of the Legion of Honour) in 2020

== Personal life ==
She is married, and a mother to a girl and a boy. Her passions include reading and contemporary dancing.

Business positions
Preceded by Antoine Frérot	CEO of Veolia; 2022–present	Succeeded by Incumbent
