= Christel Heydemann =

French businesswoman (born 1974)

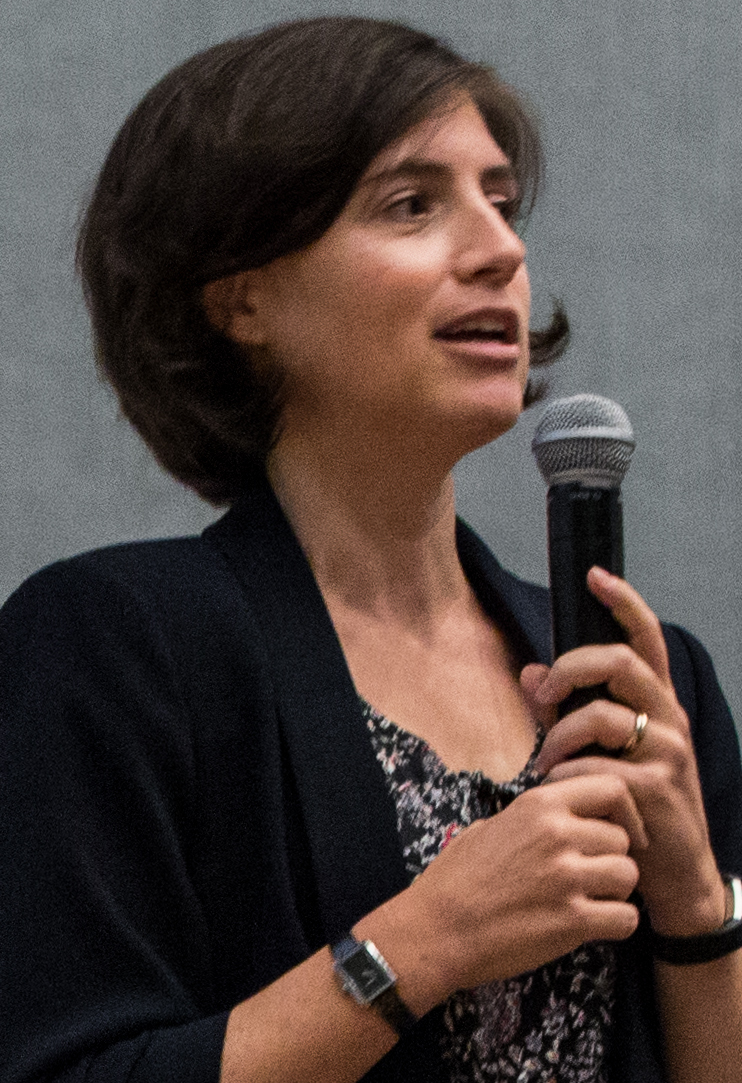
- Christel Heydemann, 2018
- Born: Christel Heydemann; 9 October 1974 (age 52); Clamart, Hauts-de-Seine
- Education: Bachelor of Engineering
- Alma mater: École polytechnique École nationale des ponts et chaussées
- Occupations: CEO, Orange S.A.
- Employer: Orange S.A.
- Spouse: André Loesekrug-Pietri
- Children: Two sons

Christel Heydemann (born 9 October 1974) is a French businesswoman and the chief executive officer (CEO) of the French telecommunications company Orange S.A. since April 2022.

She earned her bachelor's degree in engineering from École nationale des ponts et chaussées in 1999. She has previously held various senior positions at Alcatel-Lucent and Schneider Electric.

== Early life and education ==
Christel Heydemann was born on 9 October 1974, in Clamart, Hauts-de-Seine, France. Her Jewish paternal grandfather had fled Nazi Germany and established a coffee roasting business in France. Heydemann's father is a centralien and engineer, while her mother, is a graduate of École normale supérieure, and a university professor in mathematics.

After completing her higher school preparatory classes at Lycée d’Orsay (Essonne), she gained admission to École polytechnique in 1994. She continued her studies at École nationale des ponts et chaussées, earning her bachelor's degree in engineering in 1999. In 2014, she completed the Global Leadership and Public Policy for the 21st Century program at Harvard Kennedy School.

== Career ==
In 1997, she started her career as an analyst at the Boston Consulting Group. After a brief stint, she joined the French telecommunications equipment company Alcatel, which later became Alcatel-Lucent in November 2006 following the merger with New Jersey–based Lucent.

At Alcatel, she began in the Project Finance team of the Chief Financial Officer. She held various executive positions, notably in the sales division, where she was in charge of SFR and Orange key accounts. In 2008, she was Sales Director of France, then in 2009 as Vice President of Strategic Alliance for HP, and later in 2011 as Executive Vice President of Human Resources and Transformation.

In 2014, she joined Schneider Electric as vice president to handle strategic alliances, later becoming President of Schneider Electric France and eventually Executive Vice President for Europe in May 2021.

She was appointed a member of Orange's board of directors in 2017. On 28 January 2022, she was appointed chief executive officer of Orange S.A., succeeding Stéphane Richard. She took charge of her CEO duties on 4 April 2022. During that time, Heydemann was only the second female at the helm of a Paris CAC 40 company, following Engie's Catherine MacGregor, later to be joined by Estelle Brachlianoff of Veolia in July 2022.

Business positions
Preceded by Stéphane Richard	CEO of Orange S.A. 2022–present	Succeeded by Incumbent

== Other appointments ==
- President of Gimélec, since 25 May 2018
- She sits on the board of Canal+ and is an independent director at Sanofi.
- In July 2018, Heydemann was appointed a Knight of the Legion of Honour.
- In 2022, she was appointed an Officer of the French National Order of Merit.
- In May 2026, she was appointed chair of the Orange Foundation.

== Awards and recognitions ==
- She was recognised as a Young Global Leader of the World Economic Forum in 2012
- She was awarded the "Chevalier de la Légion d'Honneur" (Knight of the Legion of Honour) in 2018 in recognition of her contributions to the National Council of Industry (CNI).
- She was ranked 46th on Fortune's list of Most Powerful Women in 2023.

== Personal life ==
She is married to André Loesekrug-Pietri, who heads the Joint European Disruptive Initiative. They have two sons.
