= Pécs Power Station =

Power station in Hungary

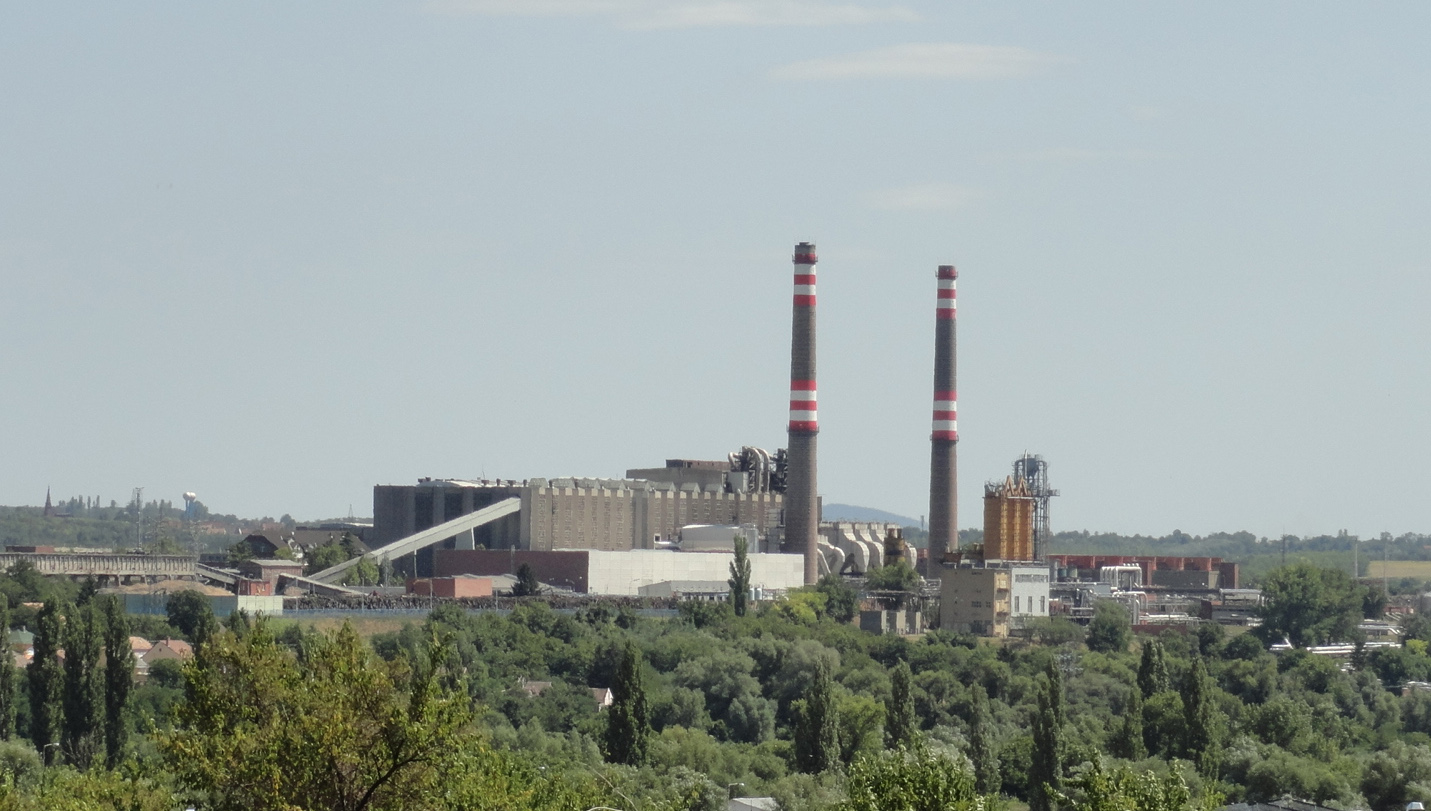
- Country: Hungary
- Location: Pécs
- Coordinates: 46°03′47″N 18°15′50″E
- Status: Operational
- Owner: Veolia Environment

Thermal power station
- Primary fuel: Biomass; Natural Gas

Power generation
- Units operational: 2 × 35MW; 2 × 65MW
- Nameplate capacity: 200 MW

External links
- Commons: Related media on Commons

The Pécs Power Station is one of Hungary's largest biomass power stations, with an installed electrical capacity of 200 MW. Two units of 35 MW, and one unit of 65 MW, uses natural gas as fuel, whereas the fourth 65 MW unit burns wood (biomass).
