= Antoine Frérot =

French businessman

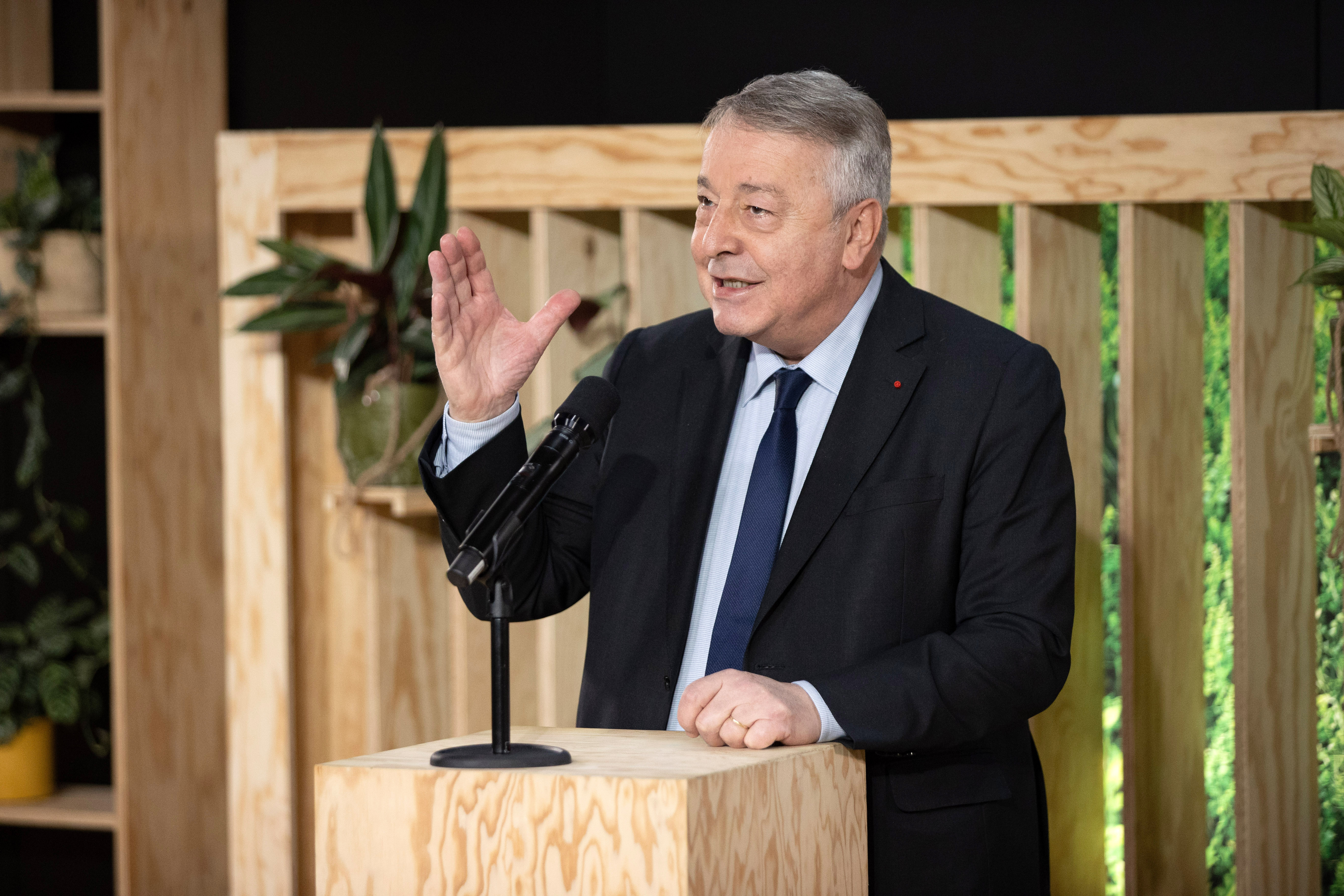
- Antoine Frérot in 2022
- Born: 3 June 1958 (age 68); Fontainebleau, France
- Education: École Polytechnique; École des ponts ParisTech
- Occupation: Chairman of the Board of Directors of Veolia

Antoine Frérot (French: [ɑ̃twan fʁeʁo]; born 3 June 1958) is a French businessman. He was Chairman and CEO of Veolia from 2009 to 2022. In July 2022, he became Chairman of the Board of Directors of Veolia.

== Education ==
Having graduated from École Polytechnique in 1977, he enrolled at École Nationale des Ponts et Chaussées, where he obtained a PhD in civil engineering. During his 7-years at the university, he co-founded a research laboratory dedicated to the study of environmental sciences, with an emphasis on hydrology.

== Early career ==
In 1981, Frérot began working as an engineer and researcher at the Central Research Office for French Overseas Departments and Territories, a company specialized in big development projects.

Two years later, he joined CERGRENE, a think-tank affiliated with his alma mater, where he served as project manager and then associate director from 1984 to 1988.

Between 1988 and 1990, Frérot worked at Credit National as finance operations manager for major transport, aerospace and heavy machinery enterprises.

== Career at Veolia ==
In 1995, 5 years after he joined Compagnie Générale des Eaux (originally as its task-force director), Frérot became the CEO of Compagnie General of Automobile Enterprises and CGEA Transport.

In June 2000, he was appointed as a board member of Vivendi Environnement and CEO of CONNEX, the transport division of the group.

Since 2003, Frérot has served as CEO of Veolia Water, as well as assistant director-general, and member of the board of executive directors, of Veolia Environnement.

=== First mandate at the head of Veolia: 2010 – 2014 ===
In 2009, Frérot was nominated to be the CEO of the Veolia group. Soon after Henri Proglio, the former director-general, stepped down in November to join Électricité de France, Frérot took over as the company's CEO. In addition to that, on 12 December 2010 he also became the Chairman and CEO of Veolia Environnement. Frérot's goal is to manage a "focused and reactive" enterprise whose activities are aligned with demands of the market and piloted by the State. As he explains: "Veolia’s culture is based on the strategy of decentralization, subsidiarity, and entrepreneurship."

In 2013, Frérot began to reorganize the Group in order to adopt a more international model. While doing that, he changed the marketing strategy so as to direct the company towards high-volume markets with greater surplus value (difficult to eradicate pollution, circular economies, a bigger clientele).

Frérot's strategy encompasses progressive disengagement from transport activities, in favor of the French Deposits and Consignments Fund, as well as decreased international expansion, limited to approximately forty countries.

The strategy allowed the group to spur positive growth, yielding revenue of positive 394 million Euro, in contrast to negative 489 million reported as per 2011. In December 2012, Frérot announced Veolia's plans to develop new, comprehensive technologies allowing to predict pollution.

=== Second mandate at the head of Veolia: 2014 – 2018 ===
On 26 February 2014 Veolia's administrative council decided to renew Frérot's mandate until 2018 in order to finalize the process of restructuring of the Group.

In September 2014, Frérot spoke at the annual Climate Summit in New York. In the spirit of his tagline, "modern mankind is living on ecological credit," he called on the participating enterprises and organizations to support projects favoring a sound and stable price of CO_{2}. According to Frérot, the carbon price should be the core of environmental politics, and a way to tackle climate change that would simultaneously enable economic growth.

In January 2015, Frérot participated in the World Economic Summit in Davos, where he proposed circular economy as another way for sustainable development. Quoting European Resource Efficiency Platform, Frérot advocated circular economy both as a means to reduce consumption of raw materials by 20%, and a source of 1.4 to 2.8 million potential jobs.

=== Third term at the head of Veolia: 2018-2022 ===
In 2018, he promotes the need for companies to have a "Purpose", with a strong conviction: "It is because a company is useful that it is prosperous, and not the other way around."

Under his leadership, the Veolia Group achieved a turnover of 25.9 billion euros in 2018 (+ 6.5% over one year) with a profitability up 7.3% (to 3.4 billion Ebitda). More than half of this growth is the result of new activities identified as strategic, such as the circular economy, energy efficiency, the treatment of difficult pollution, the management of end-of-life industrial equipment.

In 2019, it is under his leadership that Veolia becomes one of the first companies to share its "Purpose". For Antoine Frérot, "Veolia's Purpose is to contribute to human progress, by resolutely subscribing to the UN's Sustainable Development Goals, in order to achieve a better and more sustainable future for all."

At the beginning of 2022, he announced that he would step down as CEO of Veolia on 1 July 2022, although he would remain Chairman. He was replaced by his successor Estelle Brachlianoff, another graduate of Polytechnique and the Ecole des ponts et chaussées.

== Other mandates ==
- Since 2014: President of ANVIE, l'Association nationale de valorisation interdisciplinaire de la recherche en sciences humaines et sociales auprès des entreprises (National Association for Promotion of Interdisciplinary Research in the Humanities and Social Sciences in the Business Sector).
- Member of the Board of Directors of the Société d'amis du Musée du Quai Branly.

== Arts ==
In September 2014, Frérot became the honorary president of Parcours de mondes for the 13th edition of Salon international des Arts Premiers (International Salon of Tribal Arts). Frérot is an art collector, especially fond of tribal arts: "Like many enthusiasts, I discovered tribal art through modern painting and sculpture; in other words through its forms. Gradually, as I became more familiar with these objects, this attraction to form changed to an appreciation of the powerful presence of these works."

== Awards and honours ==
- Legion of Honour – Officer (2015)
- National Order of Merit – Officer (2011)
- Legion of Honour – Chevalier (2003)

== Publications ==
- Towards a Culture of Responsibility. Durham, NH: U of New Hampshire, 2011. Print. (ISBN 1584659874)

Business positions
Preceded by Henri Proglio	CEO of Veolia; 2009–2022	Succeeded by Estelle Brachlianoff
