= Biomass Energy Centre =

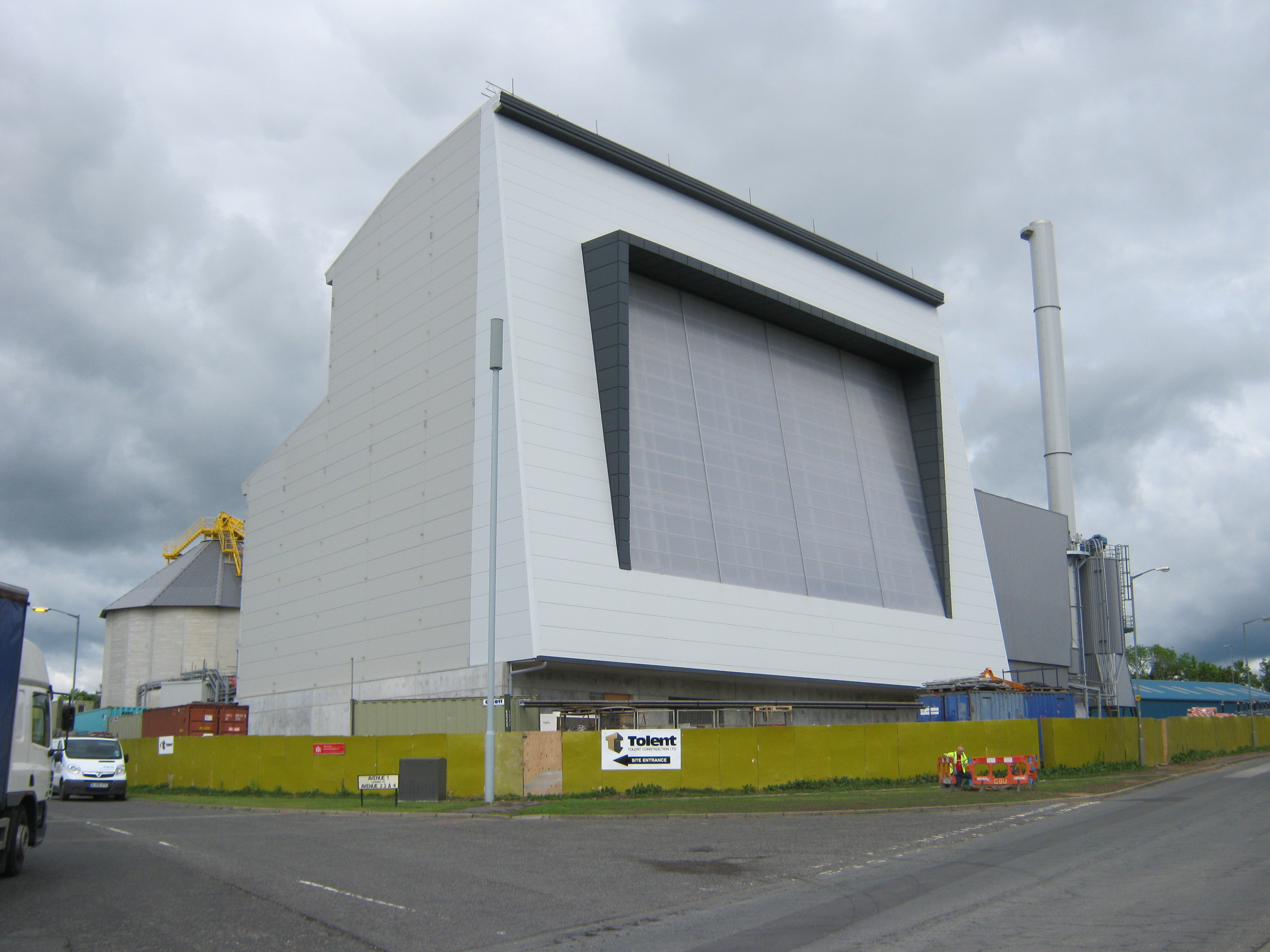
- Biomass Energy Centre, May 2011
- Country: England
- Location: Chilton
- Coordinates: 54°39′57″N 1°33′48″W
- Status: Operational
- Construction began: 2010
- Commission date: 2011
- Construction cost: £40 million
- Owner: Veolia Energy-Dalkia

Thermal power station
- Primary fuel: Biomass

Power generation
- Nameplate capacity: 17.5 MW

External links
- Website: www.dalkia.co.uk
- Commons: Related media on Commons

Biomass Energy Centre is a biomass fired CHP power station located in the town of Chilton in County Durham. Opened in 2011, the plant was developed, and then owned and operated by Veolia Energy-Dalkia.

== Development ==
In May 2009, Veolia Energy-Dalkia, who had a base in nearby Cramlington, Northumberland and had previously provided cogeneration (CHP) plants for the Newcastle General, Freeman and Royal Victoria Infirmary hospitals in Newcastle, announced their plans to build a biomass fueled CHP power station in the County Durham town of Chilton. The site chosen had previously been occupied by a feed mill and silo, which had been highly visible throughout the town and had come to be known locally as Chilton Cathedral. The new plant was expected to cost £40 million, half of which was to be spent within the North East region, on materials and components for the plant, aiding the local economy.

Chilton Town Council voted unanimously in support of the plant, saying it would be a catalyst for the regeneration of the area, and this was supported by a 340 name petition from the local people. Planning permission was granted later that June and construction commenced in January 2010. 50 jobs were created during the construction of the plant, with 17 permanent jobs created following completion. Commissioning of the plant began in June 2011, taking three to four weeks to complete.

== Operations ==
115,000 to 120,000 tonnes of wood are burned in the station per year, providing electricity for up to 20,000 homes through the National Grid. The plant is one of the first in the UK to burn domestic waste wood to provide electricity for the National Grid, rather than for an industrial site. It is the first of a number of similar sites which Dalkia are planning in the UK.

The feedstock for the plant is wood which has reached the end of its useful life such as old shipping pallets, manufacturing offcuts, wood from the construction and demolition industries, and material from civic amenity sites. This wood is collected through a network set up by Dalkia The fuel would other wise be sent to landfill.

50,000 tonnes of wood pellets are produced on site each year, for use elsewhere.

== Design and specification ==
The plant has a generating capacity of 17.5 megawatts.
