= Weroom =

Weroom is the first international social network dedicated to flatsharing. It is a platform for those seeking or offering rooms in a flatshare. The company was launched in 2013 by Thomas Villeneuve.

With more than 300,000 users worldwide, Weroom has gained an international presence. After starting in Paris, it expanded into London and has gone on to list properties and users on a global scale.

== Origin ==
Based on the fact that the flatsharing market consists of 1 million people in France and 10 million people across Europe, Thomas Villeneuve launched Weroom to fill this market. The service helps bring the community of flatsharers, landlords, tenants and agencies together to make finding a flatshare easier.

== Concept and usages ==
This platform allows users to see listings of properties and to find their future flatmates on a more personal level. Users are able to book their rooms online with the online booking system.

== History ==
Thomas Villeneuve and Isabelle George founded Weroom in 2013, in Paris.

In early 2014, the start-up was backed up by the real-estate group, Nexity, who detains 80% of its capital. In August 2014, Weroom opened up another office in London.

== Business model ==
The concept is born from a sharing economy. It is structured to act as the middle ground between supply (agencies, networks, landlords) and demand (students, young professionals, mobile professionals, seniors).

== Awards and prizes ==
- In March 2014, Weroom was included in the top 100 Red Herring Awards. The company was ranked as amongst the most innovative companies in Europe.

== Shutting down ==
- In March 2017, Weroom was ending their service . Goodbye message: "Following a change in strategy, Weroom’s adventure is ending and we regret to inform you that the platform is shutting down. We wish you well and will keep you informed should Weroom return. The Weroom team"
