= Henri Proglio =

French businessman

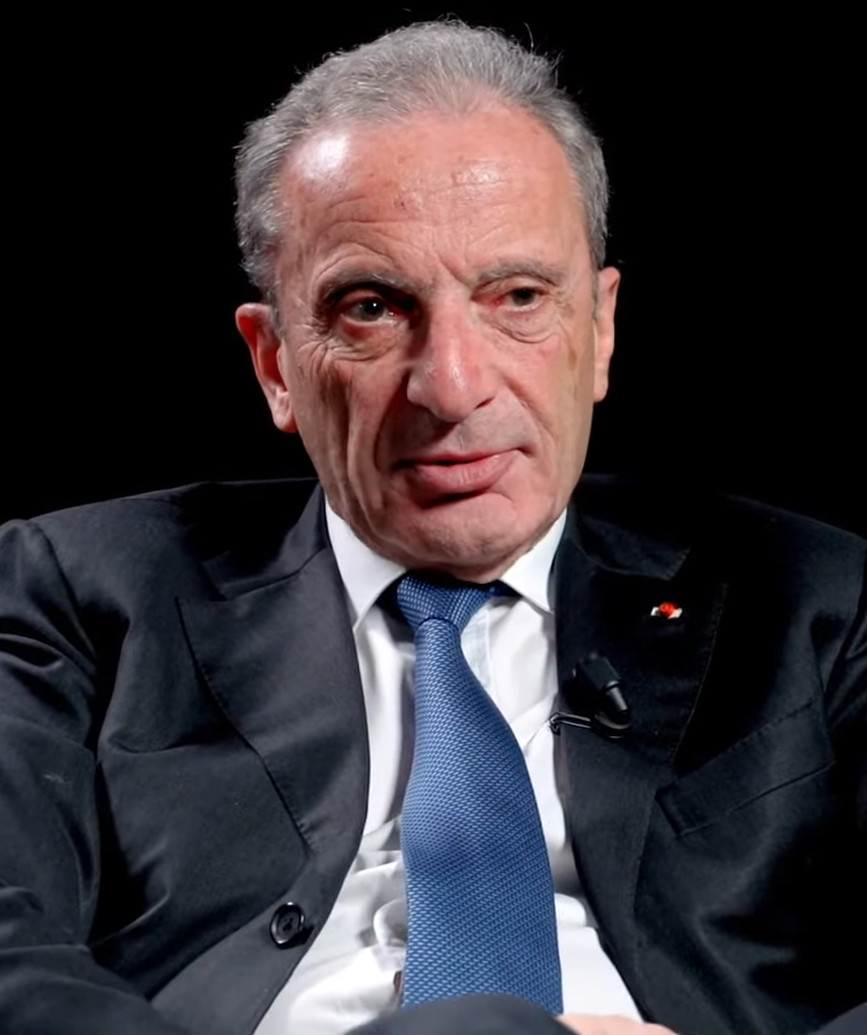
- Born: 29 June 1949 (age 76); Antibes, France
- Education: Lycée Masséna
- Alma mater: HEC Paris
- Occupation: CEO of EDF (2009-2014)

Henri Proglio (born 29 June 1949) is a French businessman, the former chairman of the board and CEO of Electricité de France and former CEO of Veolia Environnement.

== Life and career ==
Of Italian origin, Henri Proglio was born in Antibes. He is a graduate of HEC Paris (class of 1971).

In 1972, he started working for Compagnie Générale des Eaux, and he became the chairman and CEO in 1990. In 1999, he was appointed vice-president of Vivendi Universal, and chairman and CEO of Vivendi Water. In 2000, he became chairman of Veolia Environnement; three years later he also became its CEO.

He serves as non-executive director of CNP Assurances, Dassault Aviation and Natixis. He was appointed as chairman and CEO of Electricité de France in November 2009. He is a member of the Association Française des Entreprises Privées. Proglio also serves on the advisory board for the Pictet Water Fund.

He was decorated commander of the National Order of Merit of the Legion of Honour.

In December 2014 Proglio was appointed second-in-command and chairman of Thales Group.

Business positions
| Preceded by Jean-Marie Messier | CEO of Veolia Environnement; 2002–2009 | Succeeded by Antoine Frérot |
| Preceded by Pierre Gadonneix | CEO of EDF; 2009–2014 | Succeeded by Jean-Bernard Lévy |
