= Veolia =

French transnational environmental service company

Veolia Environnement S.A.

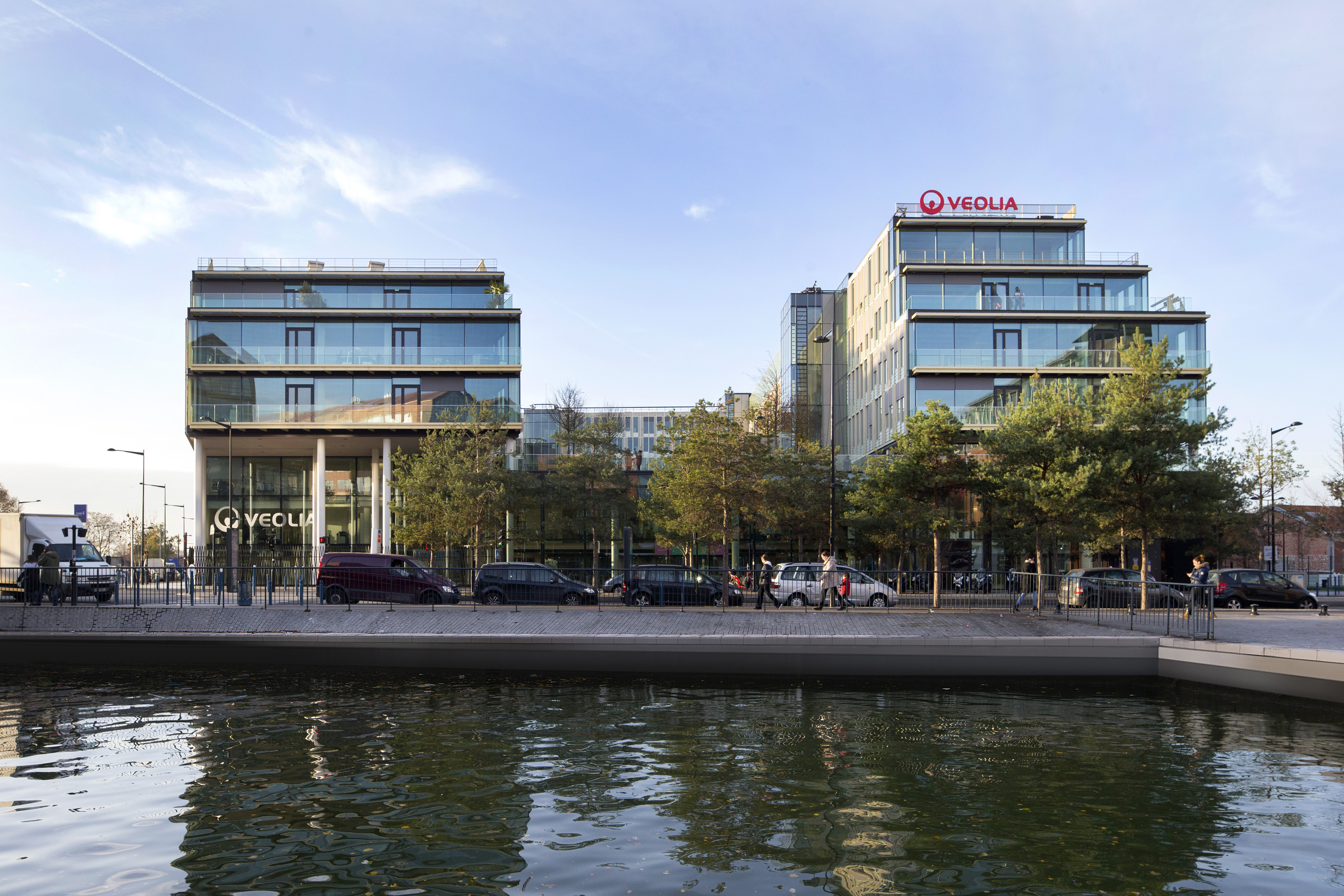
- Veolia headquarters in Aubervilliers, Île-de-France
- Type: Public
- Traded as: Euronext Paris: VIE; CAC 40 component
- ISIN: FR0000124141
- Industry: Environmental services
- Founded: 1853; 173 years ago (Compagnie Générale des Eaux); 1998; 28 years ago (Vivendi Environnement); 2003; 23 years ago (Veolia Environnement)
- Headquarters: Aubervilliers, France
- Key people: Estelle Brachlianoff (CEO); Antoine Frérot (chairman)
- Services: Water treatment, waste management, HVAC, street lighting, facility management services
- Revenue: ▲€44.396 billion (2025)
- Net income: ▲€1.643 billion (2025)
- Total assets: €72.959 billion (end 2024)
- Total equity: €12.915 billion (end 2024)
- Number of employees: 215,000 (2024)
- Website: www.veolia.com

Veolia Environnement S.A., branded as Veolia, is a French transnational company with activities in three main service and utility areas traditionally managed by public authorities – water management, waste management and energy services. In 2025, Veolia employed 215,000 employees in 56 countries. Its revenue in that year was recorded at €44.396 billion. It is quoted on Euronext Paris. It is headquartered in Aubervilliers.

Prior to 1998, Veolia was known as Compagnie Générale des Eaux. Between 1998 and 2003, the company was known as Vivendi Environnement, having been spun off from the Vivendi conglomerate, most of the rest of which became Vivendi.

In 2014, following a major restructuring, the company adopted the single name "Veolia" for all its operations, adding the name of the business sector to ensure clear identification (e.g., Veolia Environment. In french : "Veolia Environnement"). At the end of 2020, Veolia took over 29.9% of its competitor Suez Eau France as part of a strategy to expand its environmental services operations. The merger terms were signed in May 2021. In July 2022, Estelle Brachlianoff became the CEO of the group, succeeding Antoine Frérot, who stayed on as chairman of its board.

== History ==
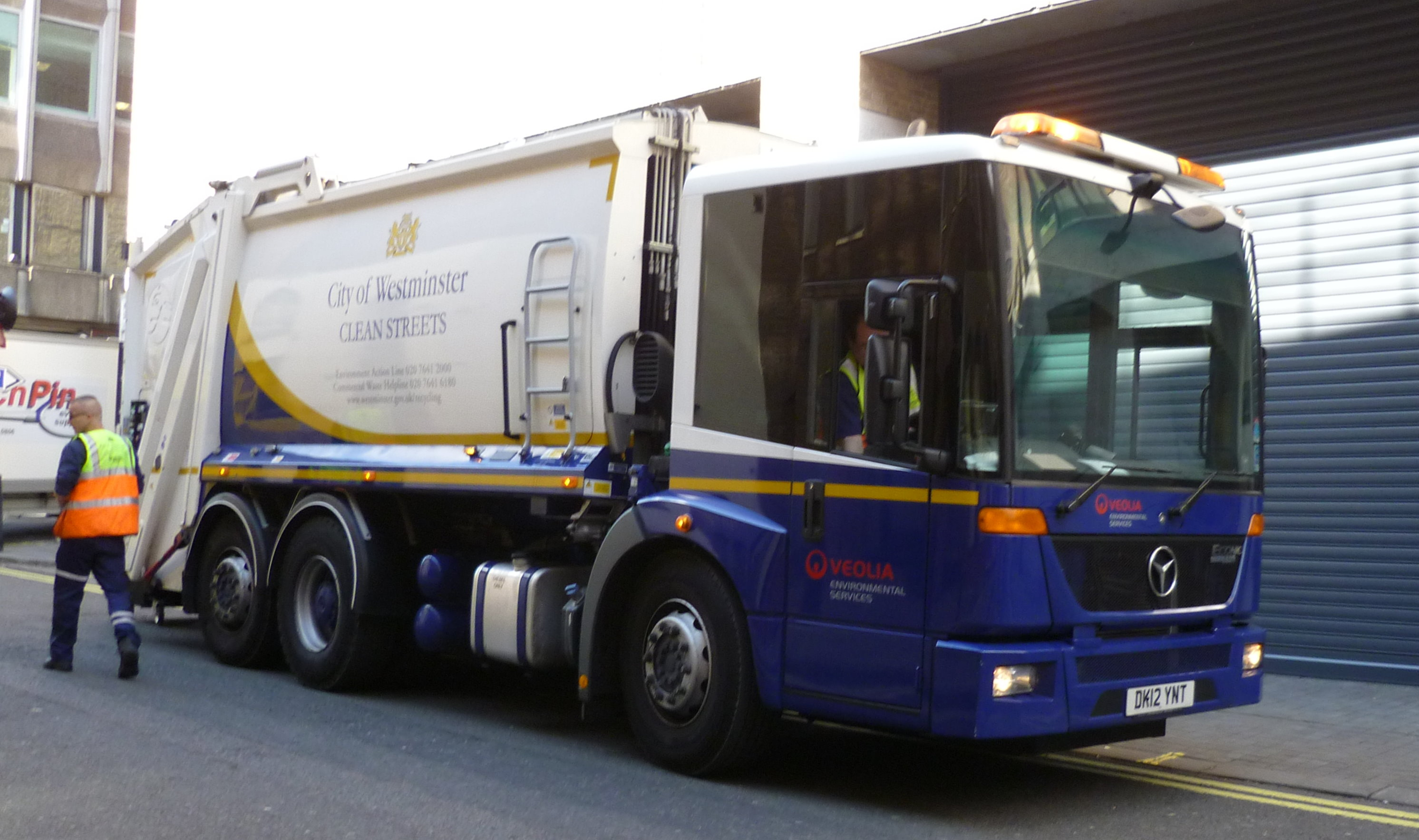
A City of Westminster Veolia refuse lorry in central London

=== 1853–2003: Compagnie Générale des Eaux and Vivendi ===
On 14 December 1853, a water company named Compagnie Générale des Eaux (CGE) was created by an Imperial decree of Napoleon III. In 1853, CGE obtained a concession to supply water to the public in Lyon, serving in this capacity for over a hundred years. In 1860, it obtained a 50-year concession with the City of Paris.

For a hundred years, Compagnie Générale des Eaux remained largely focused on the water sector. However, following the appointment of Guy Dejouany as CEO in 1976, CGE extended its activities into other sectors with a series of takeovers.

Beginning in 1980, CGE began diversifying its operations from water into waste management, energy, transport services, and construction and property. It did so by acquiring:

- Compagnie générale française des transports et entreprises (CGFTE), created from Compagnie Générale Française de Tramways (CGFT) (originally founded in 1875) in 1953. It was absorbed into CGEA Transport (later Connex).
- Compagnie Générale d'Entreprises Automobiles (CGEA), which specialized in industrial vehicles and later divided into two branches: The transport division became Connex in 1999 and the waste management and environmental services became Onyx Environnement in 1989. CGEA was created in 1912.
- Compagnie Générale de Chauffe (CGC) (and also later the Montenay group in 1986), with these companies later becoming the Energy Services division of CGE, and later renamed "Dalkia" in 1998. CGC was created in 1935.

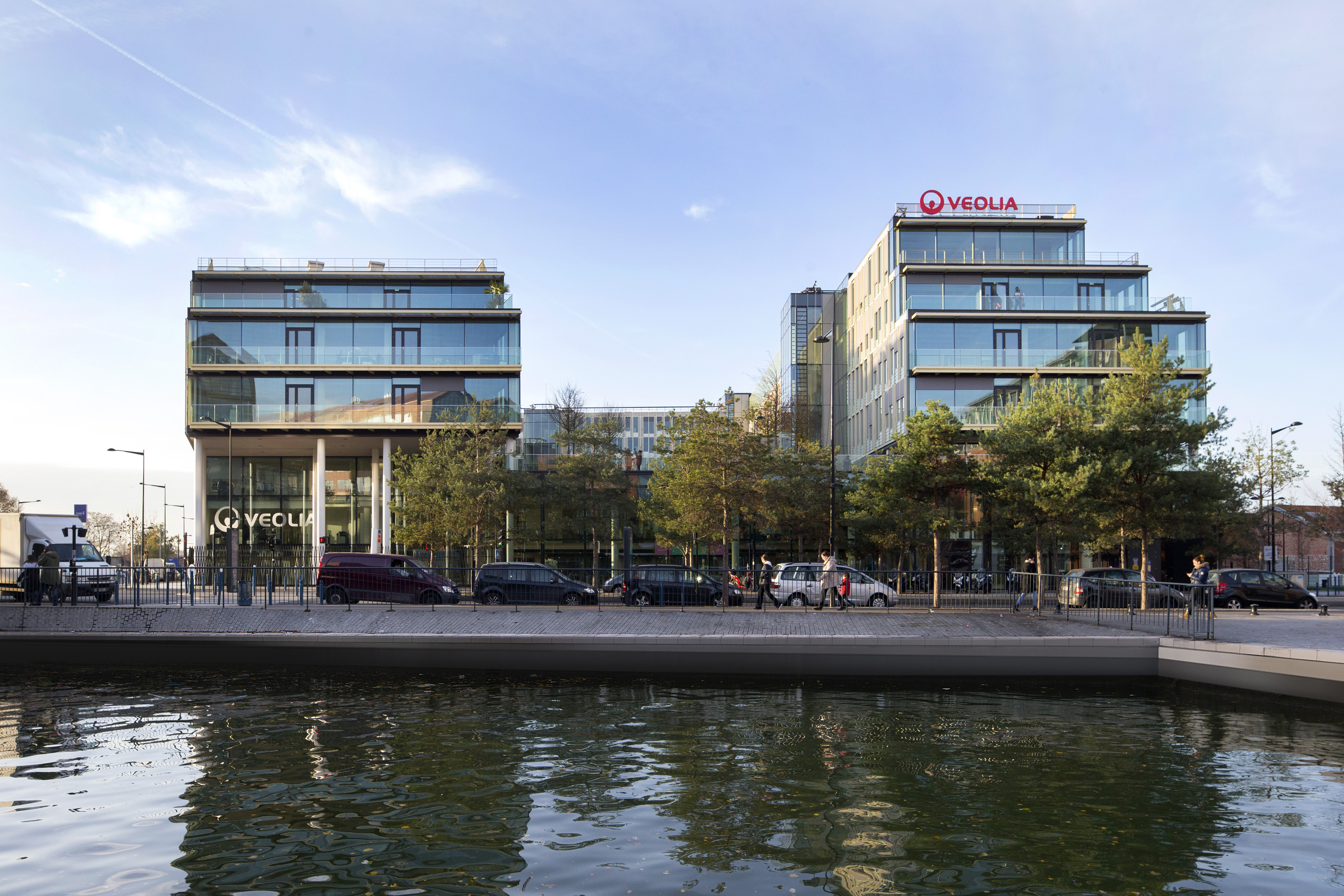
Veolia World headquarters in Aubervilliers, 30, rue Madeleine Vionnet in France

In 1998, CGE changed its name to "Vivendi", and the following year it sold off its property and construction divisions. Vivendi Environnement was formed in 1999 to consolidate its environmental divisions. Its divisions at the formation of Vivendi Environnement were:

- Vivendi Water (only renamed in 1999 - A company governed by French law with a global reach)
- Dalkia (originally CGC and already renamed since 1998)
- Onyx Environnement (originally part of CGEA and already branded since 1989)
- Connex (remaining part of CGEA )

Vivendi went on to list on the New York Stock Exchange (as "V"), and in December, announced a major merger with Canal+ and Seagram, the owner of Universal Studios film company, to become Vivendi Universal and now named Vivendi.

In July 2000, Vivendi Environnement was divested through IPOs in Paris and later New York in October 2001). Initially, Vivendi Universal retained a 70% stake in Vivendi Environnement in 2000, but by December 2002, it was reduced to 20.4%. In 2003, Vivendi Environnement was renamed to Veolia Environnement.

=== 2003–2020 ===
As a result of Vivendi Environnement spinning off from its parent Vivendi Universal in 2002, in 2003, Vivendi Environnement was renamed to Veolia Environnement. In 2005, the name "Veolia" was established as an umbrella brand for all of the Group's divisions (water, environmental services, energy services and transport) and a new logo was created. The names of the divisions at the time of rebranding were:

- Veolia Water (originally Vivendi Water)
- Dalkia (no change in name, but became a joint venture with Électricité de France (EDF) in 2000)
- Veolia Environmental Services (originally Onyx Environnement)
- Veolia Transport (originally Connex)

In November 2009, Antoine Frérot became the chairman and the CEO of the group after succeeding Henri Proglio who was appointed CEO of Électricité de France. The change was part of a huge politico-financial scandal in France as Proglio kept executive positions – and subsequent salary – in both companies until public criticism forced him to give up his Veolia revenues.

Its Veolia Water division remains the largest private operator of water services in the world, providing services across the globe. Transdev (formerly Veolia Transdev) was formed in 2011 from a merger of Veolia Transport with the old Transdev, a subsidiary of Caisse des Dépôts. Currently, Veolia owns 30% of the company's shares. Prior to the merger, Veolia Transport was the transport division of Veolia. It was originally part of the CGEA, which was acquired in 1980, and the transport division was then renamed Connex in 1999, then finally renamed to Veolia Transport in 2005.

At the time of merger, Veolia Transport recorded revenues of €7.863 billion in 2011 (For 2010: Europe 83%, included France 37.1%, North America 13.2%, Asia-Pacific 3.7%). It employed 101,798 people. It worked with public authorities under public-private partnerships to manage public transit systems (buses, trains, metros, ferries, etc.). On 6 December 2011, Veolia Environment, seeking to reduce debt and focus on its core businesses of water, waste and energy, announced that it will eventually sell its share in Veolia Transdev, within a two-year time frame, by when its own activities will have been reorganized. After this announcement, the Caisse des Dépôts et Consignations, for its part, officially reiterated its commitment to Veolia Transdev and its continued support as a shareholder to the group's development.

In early 2012, it was reported that Cube Infrastructure, a fund controlled by the French bank Natixis (Groupe BPCE), was likely to acquire about half of Veolia's stake in Transdev. The Caisse des Dépôts would take over the other half. This was later changed in October 2012 to Caisse des Dépôts acquiring 10% of the shares from Veolia. This however was not implemented. In December 2016, CDC finally bought 20% shares from Veolia. As a result, Veolia's share on the company reduced to 30%.

In January 2019, the 30% share was sold to the Rethmann Group, the owner of Rhenus. In 2012, the group launched a major restructuring plan: one Veolia per country for a single international headquarters. The company's activity is refocused on markets with large volumes and greater added value (difficult-to-treat pollution, the circular economy, more industrial groups as customers, etc.). Veolia Environnement officially becomes Veolia. In Latin America, Proactiva was a 50-50 joint venture formed in 1999 between Veolia Environnement and Fomento de Construcciones y Contratas (FCC), until Veolia bought the other 50% share from FCC in 2013. As a result, Veolia now owns 100% of Proactiva. In 2014, EDF took over Dalkia's activities in France while Veolia took over 100% of Dalkia's international activities.

In February 2016, Veolia acquired the American Kurion, which specializes in low-level radioactive residue remediation techniques, for 350 million dollars. The acquisition expanded the activities of Asteralis, its subsidiary focused on waste characterization and nuclear facility assessment. It was part of Veolia's 2016–2018 investment plan, which also included cost-reduction measures. In May 2016, Veolia announced the creation of the largest sewage sludge treatment plant in the world, located in Hong Kong. In June 2016, Veolia announced the acquisition for $325 million of the sulfuric acid activities of the company Chemours, resulting from the split of the specialty chemicals activities of DuPont. The following month, Veolia continued its acquisitions and acquired the Szakoly power plant, the fifth largest electricity production facility in Hungary from biomass and contributed to the development of renewable energies in the country.

In North America, Veolia Energy traded under the Trigen Energy name until February 2011. It was a major operator and developer of efficient district energy (heating, cooling, and cogeneration) systems in North America, located in ten major U.S. cities. It also provides facility operations, energy management, and advisory services. In July 2019, Veolia sold its heating and cooling networks in the United States for $1.25 billion to the French investment fund Antin Infrastructure Partners, which renamed the business Vicinity Energy. In December 2019, Veolia, through its subsidiary Veolia Nuclear Solutions, and the electrician EDF announced the creation of Graphitech, a company responsible for dismantling graphite technology nuclear reactors.

=== 2020–present ===
On 30 August 2020, Veolia made an offer to ENGIE to buy back 29.9% of Suez shares for the sum of 2.9 billion euros, and then proposed a public tender offer for Suez for the rest shares. In October 2020, Veolia acquired the 29.9% stake in Engie, for 3.4 billion euros. In April 2021, Veolia and Suez publish a joint press release claiming to have found common ground for Veolia to absorb a large part of Suez's international activities, which should bring Veolia's valuation to 37 billion euros. This operation values Suez at 13 billion euros.

A merger agreement was signed in May 2021 to formalize the transaction. In December 2021, the European Commission approved the takeover, subject to a series of conditions, including asset divestments to address competition concerns. In early 2022, Veolia announced the completion of its acquisition of Suez and its intention to integrate the acquired activities within the group.

In July 2022, Estelle Brachlianoff became the CEO of the Group after succeeding Antoine Frérot who remained as Chairman of its Board. In November 2025, Veolia Environnement acquired the American company Clean Earth for 3.04 billion dollars.

== Operations ==
=== Overview ===
Veolia is established in 56 countries, with employees across the globe in 2024:

- Europe (excluding France): 39.3%
- France: 20.6%
- Asia and Oceania: 15.1%
- Latin America: 11.9%
- North America: 6.5%
- Africa and Middle-East: 6.6%

The group operates in the water, waste and energy sectors. It is present on five continents and has 215,000 employees. In 2025, the Veolia group had 110 million users for its drinking water supply services and 97 million for sanitation. According to company figures, it produced nearly 45 terawatt hours and recovered 64 million tonnes of waste. Its consolidated turnover is 44.4 billion euros for a net profit of 1,643 million euros. The company is listed on the Paris Stock Exchange under the VIE, Fortune 500, SBF 120 index.

== Financial information ==
On 31 December 2024, shares in Veolia Environnement were held as follows: 10.4% Individual shareholders, 8.9% Employees, 5.9% BlackRock, 5.8% Amundi, 4.7% Caisse des Dépôts et Consignations CNP, 3.4% Vanguard, 2.9% Impax, 2.1% BPCE, 2.0% Strate Street, 1.9% Pictet, 1.7% Norges, 1.4% Self detention, 48.8% Other institutional shareholders

Veolia issued two profit warnings in 2011 and announced plans to quit half of the 77 countries where it does business. It launched a €5 billion ($6.4 billion) fire sale of assets. The company and its top executives were facing the prospect of a U.S. class-action lawsuit in January 2012 over allegations that they made "misleading" statements between 2007 and 2011 about its financial well-being. The company, which was described as "struggling" by the Financial Times, said that a complaint had been filed against it in New York for violation of U.S. federal securities laws. Veolia's shares were the worst performer on France's CAC 40 index in 2011, falling 60%.

The following is a summary of data (in millions of euros):

Financial data in millions of euros
Year	2018	2019	2020	2021	2022	2023	2024	2025
Consolidated revenue	25,951.1	27,188.7	26,009.9	28,508.1	42,885	45,351	44,692	44,396
Operating income	1,459.3	1,464.8	919.5	1,317.5	2,333	2,847	3,012	
Net income	672	759.8	381.8	895.8	1,162	1,335	1,530	1,643
Free cash-flow	536	868	507	1,340.5	1,032	1,143	1,156	1,178
Net financial debt	11,564	10,680	13,217	9,532.2	18,138	17,903	17,819	19,657
Staff	171,495	178,780	178,894	176,488	220,000	218,288	215,041	215,000

== Corporate social responsibility ==
The company reports activities related to sustainable development across its water, waste, and energy operations. Environmental and social objectives are included in its corporate strategy. The company is involved to a greater or lesser extent in the implementation of each of the 17 UN SDGs, and reports alignment with 13 of the 17 UN Sustainable Development Goals. The company's sustainability efforts are furthered by its Foundation and Institute which support activities related to research and environmental initiatives.

=== The Veolia Foundation ===
The Veolia Foundation supports non-profit activities related to sustainable development, professional continuous development and the protection of the environment in France and overseas. The foundation supports projects through financial aid and voluntary services provided by its employees. It also supports emergency relief operations in collaboration with humanitarian organisations.

Following the 2010 Haiti earthquake, the Veolia Foundation dispatched 30 tons of emergency supplies (mainly water treatment units) via French Red Cross air transportation. The Foundation also sent Veolia technical experts to provide water to the disaster's victims. In the Philippines, in November 2013 Typhoon Yolanda ravaged the center of the archipelago and affected 10 million inhabitants, Veolia Foundation intervened alongside the NGO Solidarités International in the region of Tacloban, the first coastal town in the path of the typhoon, to bring aid to the devastated population.

In 2016, after Hurricane Matthew hit Haiti, the Veolia Foundation intervened to restore drinking water with the NGO Acted.

=== Institut Veolia ===
The Institut Veolia was created in 2001 to conduct research and publish work on global challenges such as climate change, urbanisation and various economic, social and cultural issues related to the environment. The Institute is built around a committee that brings together seven experts and an international network of researchers and experts. Its activities include organising conferences and publishing articles and reports.

== Research and development ==
As of 31 December 2009, the Group's research and development investments reached €89.8 million (€92.1 million in 2008, €84.6 million in 2007).

The Research and Innovation division includes 850 experts and supports around 200 scientific partnerships with private and public organisations. The division focuses on four main issues:

- Manage and preserve natural resources
- Control impacts on natural environments
- Care for health and living environments
- Develop alternative sources of energy

=== Programmes ===
Veolia's R&I division has determined nine main development programmes through which a number of research projects are managed:

- Waste collection, sorting, and beneficial re-use
- Sustainable city and building management
- Energy efficiency
- Environmental and health standards
- New activities
- Bioresources
- Drinking water
- Wastewater

== Operating events ==
=== West Carrollton plant explosion ===
On 4 May 2009, a Veolia Environmental Service's plant in West Carrollton, Ohio, United States, exploded. The blast leveled two buildings on the property which were a laboratory and a building that had several 200,000 gallon chemical tanks. This particular plant handles fuel blending among other services. Two workers at the plant were injured in the blast. The explosion caused $50 million in damage to the plant itself. More than a dozen homes up to a mile radius from the blast were also damaged due to the explosion.

=== Fatal accident in Gatlinburg ===
Two workers died after a catastrophic mechanical failure in April 2011 at a waste water treatment plant in Gatlinburg, Tennessee, United States, owned by the local municipality and operated by Veolia Water. At least 1.5 million gallons of a mix of storm and sewage water were spilled into a nearby river after a sewage-holding wall collapsed.

=== Wellington wastewater plant failure ===
On 4 February 2026, a wastewater plant in Wellington, New Zealand, operated and maintained by Veolia suffered a catastrophic failure due to waste water backing up from the outfall pipeline while the plant was undergoing maintenance. The flooding caused the control room to be submerged 3 metres deep, resulting in widespread damage to the facility and taking it completely offline, resulting in 70 million litres of untreated waste water per day to be discharged 5 metres off shore. The fallout, described by Wellington Mayor Andrew Little as an "Environmental disaster", resulted in the entire south coast of Wellington being off limits to residents due to safety concerns, contributing to widespread business losses and frustration among the residents of Wellington. The failure comes amid years of performance failures, non-compliance, and infringement notices in relation to the Wellington plant.

== Controversies ==
=== Veolia v Lithuania ===
In 2017, French company Veolia sued Lithuania in Stockholm arbitration court demanding about 100 million euros in damages. Veolia alleges that Lithuanian government is involved in illegal conduct and that it expropriated Veolia's investments. This is Veolia's second arbitration lawsuit against Lithuania after it sued Lithuania in Washington arbitration court in 2016.

=== Relations with Israel ===
In February 2011, the Tower Hamlets London Borough Council of the London borough of Tower Hamlets, voted to review its position with Veolia and place no further contracts with it, after claiming that Veolia's work for the Israeli government assisted the "continued oppression of the Palestinian people".

The Justice and Peace Commission, part of the Catholic Church in England, urged London municipalities to stop doing business with Veolia because of its involvement with illegal settlements. Veolia stated that it did not consider its activities to be in violation of international law.

Palestinian human-rights organization Al-Haq instructed lawyers in the Netherlands to submit a formal objection against the decision of Stadsregio Arnhem Nijmegen, a municipality, to award a public transport concession to Hermes, the Dutch subsidiary of Veolia Transdev. The objection was based on Veolia's involvement in what Al-Haq claims are Israel's violations of international law.

In a 2012 interview with the Israeli press, Veolia's Denis Gasquet, senior executive vice president, admitted that Veolia had been under pressure from pro-Palestinian groups in Europe, particularly over the Jerusalem Light Rail. Parties within Veolia had argued that the group was losing tenders as a result, but Gasquest said he did not know of any tenders lost due to Veolia's activities in Israel. He confirmed Veolia's intention to stay in Israel and the occupied Palestinian territories, while exiting the transport business.

On 1 April 2015, the company announced on its website "Veolia closes the sale of its activities in Israel." This was taken by supporters of the BDS (Boycott Divestment and Sanctions) movement to signify a success for their campaigning efforts: "The sale follows a worldwide campaign against the company’s role in illegal Israeli settlements that cost the firm billions of dollars of lost contracts."

=== Unpaid internships ===
Veolia offered unpaid internship positions under the Irish government's JobBridge initiative. This scheme was opposed by left-wing political groups, who claim it amounts to free labour and can cause a claimant who refuses many such offers to fall foul of a provision in the Irish Social Welfare that allows benefits to be withdrawn from unemployed who were fired.

=== Flint water crisis ===
On 22 June 2016, Michigan Attorney General Bill Schuette began its first civil action in the Flint water crisis by filing suit against Veolia North America and Lockwood, Andrews & Newnam (LAN) who were hired to consult Flint water plant officials after the switch to the Flint River in April 2015. The lawsuit, at that time, had accused Veolia and LAN of professional negligence and public nuisance. Veolia was also, at that time, accused of fraud. Veolia disputed the allegations, stating that it had raised concerns about potential lead and copper issues during its work and that city officials had limited the scope of its involvement while separate testing was being conducted by the city and the EPA.

== Corporate Mergers ==
- Veolia
  - Suez (2022)
    - GE Water (2017)
      - Glegg Water Conditioning (1999)
      - Betz Dearborn (2002)
      - Osmonics, Inc. (acquired 2003)
      - ZENON Environmental (2006)
        - Thetford Systems
        - Alpha Plan GmbH (2005)
        - Saxonia BioTec GmbH (2005)
      - Ionics Inc.
      - GE Betz
      - Culliganwater
      - Monsal (2014)
      - IMT Solutions (acquired 2015)
    - Degrémont
    - Ondeo
  - Dalkia (established 1998 from merger)
    - Compagnie Générale de Chauffe (merged 1998)
    - Esys-Montenay (merged 1998)
  - Historical consolidations (1980s)
    - Grandjouan and Soulier
    - Compagnie Générale d'Entreprises Automobiles
  - SARPI (established 1970s – hazardous waste)
  - Water Technologies and Solutions (full ownership 2025)

== See also ==
- Distributed generation
- Veolia Transport
- Water privatization
