= Veolia Water =

Water supply and treatment division of French company Veolia Environnement

- Type: Division
- Industry: Water supply, water treatment and sewage treatment
- Founded: 1853; 173 years ago
- Headquarters: Paris, France
- Key people: Jean-Michel Herrewyn (Chief Executive Officer)
- Revenue: ▲€12.5 billion
- Number of employees: 95,789
- Parent: Veolia Environnement
- Subsidiaries: Proxiserve; SEDE Environnement; Sétude; Seureca; SIDEF; Veolia Water Solutions & Technologies
- Website: www.veolia.com

Veolia Water (formerly Vivendi Water, originally Compagnie Générale des Eaux) is the water division of the French company Veolia Environnement and a major supplier of water services.

== History ==
On December 14, 1853, the creation of the Compagnie Générale des Eaux was authorized by imperial decree as a public limited company with a capital of 20 million.

In 1889, its first research laboratory was established at 52, rue d’Anjou in Paris, France. Veolia Water’s headquarters are still located at this site.

1918 saw the creation of the SADE (Société Auxiliaire des Distributions d'Eau), specializing in water networks and the delivery of drinking water. In 1953, construction began on a CGE water treatment facility at Clay Lane, near London; by 2001, it was one of the world’s largest ultrafiltration plants, supplying water to 750,000 people in the city.

Veolia Water established the Waterforce emergency response team in 1998, prompted by Hurricane Mitch in Nicaragua and the flooding of the Yangtze River in China.

In 1980, CGE expanded into other businesses such as transport and energy services by acquiring other companies. The original CGE water industry remained as the water division of CGE. In 1998, CGE was renamed Vivendi, and in 1999, the environmental divisions of CGE was consolidated under Vivendi Environnement, with the water division renamed Vivendi Water in 1999. In 2003, Vivendi Environnement was renamed Veolia Environnement. Two years later in 2005, Veolia Environnement united its four global divisions (Environmental Services, Energy, Transport and Water) under the Veolia brand. Vivendi Water thus was renamed Veolia Water.

In 2002, Vivendi Water began providing municipal water services in 2002 to major cities such as Indianapolis (USA), Bucharest (Romania), Berlin (Germany) and Shanghai (China).

The UK water supply businesses branded as Veolia Water were sold by Veolia Environnement for £1.2 billion on 28 June 2012 to Rift Acquisitions, an entity established by Morgan Stanley and M&G Investments. Veolia Environnement is using the proceeds of the disposal to reduce its debt, as part of a 5bn-euro debt-reduction programme announced in December 2011 and will retain a 10% stake in the new business Affinity Water for at least five years. Affinity Water began operations on 1 October 2012.

== Subsidiaries ==
Veolia Water’s subsidiaries include:

- SADE, which to builds and maintains water mains and water networks for delivering and distributing drinking water, and processing waste water, subsequently divested to NGE in 2024.
- Veolia Water Solutions and Technologies. In 2025 Veolia acquired a 30% stake owned by CDPX, giving Veolia full ownership of the subsidiary.
- Krüger A/S, Denmark (Annual revenue €177,000,000 (2008))

Veolia Water also has joint subsidiaries with other Veolia divisions. With Dalkia, it has Proxiserve. This subsidiary provides home-based services related to heating and water distribution systems. With Veolia Environmental Services, it has SEDE Environnement (management of waste sludge) and SIDEF (Services to Industry for the Treatment of Effluent).
