= Stéphane Richard =

French businessman (born 1961)

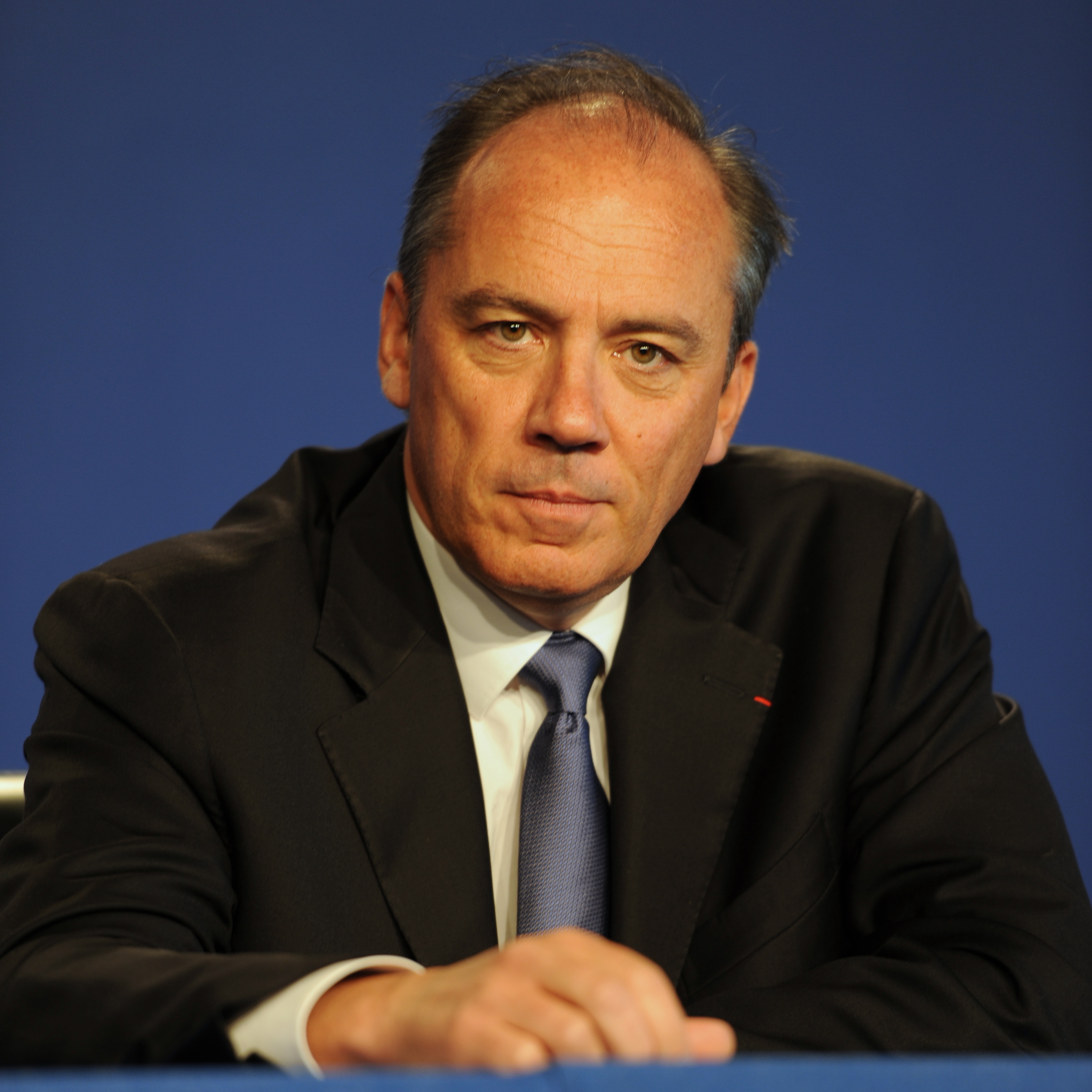
- Richard in 2011

President of Olympique de Marseille
- Incumbent
- Assumed office 2 July 2026
- Preceded by: Pablo Longoria

CEO of Orange
- In office 24 February 2011 – 4 April 2022
- Preceded by: Didier Lombard
- Succeeded by: Christel Heydemann

Personal details
- Born: 24 August 1961 (age 64) Caudéran, France
- Education: HEC Paris; ÉNA

Stéphane Richard (born 24 August 1961) is a French businessman who was the chief executive officer and chairman of the worldwide mobile phone network Orange from 2011 to 2021. In December 2021, he resigned after being sentenced for complicity in fraud and misuse of public funds. He will officially take charge of the presidency of Olympique de Marseille on 2 July 2026.

== Early life ==
The son of a mining engineer and grandson of a shepherd, Richard was born in Caudéran in the Gironde department in Aquitaine (South-West France), on 24 August 1961. He studied at HEC Paris and École nationale d'administration in Strasbourg.

== Career ==
Richard made his fortune from his involvement in the leveraged buyout of Nexity, a property development subsidiary of Compagnie Générale des Eaux, the group he joined in 1992.

=== French government ===
From 2007 until 2009 Richard was chief of staff to Christine Lagarde, then French Minister for the Economy, Industry, and Employment.

=== Orange ===
Richard joined Orange in September 2009, becoming deputy chief executive. He was appointed chief executive of Orange S.A. on 1 March 2011. In 2019, Orange voted to renew his mandate. A popular chief executive, Richard is credited with improving revenues and market share in the competitive French telecoms market and restoring relations with unions after a spate of suicides shook the company.

In late 2021, Richard announced his intention to stay in his position for a fourth term after his mandate ends in May 2022. When he was given a one year-suspended prison sentence in a fraud case in France unconnected to the company, he handed in his resignation in November 2021.

In November 2021, he was sentenced for complicity in fraud and misuse of public funds in the Crédit Lyonnais arbitration case and he announced that he resigns from his position as CEO of Orange S.A.

== Other activities ==
=== Corporate boards ===
- Nexity, Member of the board of directors

=== Non-profit organizations ===
- GSMA, Chairman (since 2019)
- European Round Table of Industrialists (ERT), Member
- Fondation Orange, President of the board of directors

== Controversy ==
=== Legal issues ===
In 2007 news media reported rumors of an imminent arrest warrant for tax fraud. By early 2019, French state prosecutors called for Richard to be sentenced to three years in jail — with half the time suspended — as well as a €100,000 fine and a five-year ban on any work for the state. Richard denied the allegations, saying he was doing his job and only played a secondary role in an arbitration process in which businessman Bernard Tapie was awarded 403 million euros ($491.62 million) as part of a state-funded settlement. The trial ended with Richard being cleared of any wrongdoing.

In June 2021, a French prosecutor proposed penalties similar to the ones pronounced two years earlier.

=== Israel activities ===
In June 2015, Richard said in Egypt that he would like to withdraw the Orange brand from Israel as soon as possible, but that the move would take time. “Our intention is to withdraw from Israel. It will take time” but “for sure we will do it,” he said. “I am ready to do this tomorrow morning… but without exposing Orange to huge risks.”

In response, a wide range of Israeli politicians condemned his statements and called on the French government to oppose antisemitism. Miri Regev said: "On the backdrop of the recent serious events in France, the French government must show zero tolerance for anti-Semitism," said Regev, in reference to the growing wave of anti-Semitic violence in the France that was highlighted in January by a Muslim holding a kosher supermarket hostage in Paris and murdering four Jews. "I call on Jews of France and the world to disconnect from Orange unless Stephane Richard takes back his words. The time has come for them to understand that Jews in the world and sane voices that oppose anti-Semitism and racism also have power." Yair Lapid said of Richard, ““This is hypocrisy of the highest order... Israel is an island of sanity in the world's toughest neighborhood, and we are not prepared to be lectured on morality from Europeans who live a quiet, untroubled life.”

Israel's president Reuvin Rivlin said of Richard: "Disturbingly, I have yet to hear condemnations from France's heads of state of the statements by the CEO of France Telecom like those I heard from Britain, and I expect their voices to be heard here in Israel, in Cairo, and the entire world."

Richard rejected the accusation of antisemitism and went on the record to say, "We [Orange] love Israel. This has absolutely nothing to do with the kind of political debate in which I don't want to be." He said that the decision to withdraw from Israel was purely a business decision, not a political decision. The decision was to disallow companies to license the Orange brand that does not use Orange's services, which is the practice of the Israeli company Partner. Orange plans not to renew its contract with Partner once the terms of the contract are complete. Richard also said that Orange has connections in Israel in other capacities aside from their deal with Partner and that they intend to keep and foster these relationships.

In January 2016 Partner officially announced that it is severing ties with France's Orange and is receiving €90 million compensation from Orange for Richard's comments.

=== 2021 disruption of emergency phone services ===
In June 2021, amid the COVID-19 pandemic in France, Richard came under political pressure after a network outage at Orange prevented emergency calls for several hours. He was summoned by Minister of the Interior Gérald Darmanin, who called the disruption "serious and unacceptable."

== Recognition ==
Richard was awarded the Legion of Honour (Ordre national de la Légion d'honneur) in 2006.

== Personal life ==
Richard is a father of five children from different marriages. He is a classically trained pianist and supports two football teams, Olympique de Marseille and Paris Saint-Germain.

Business positions
Preceded by Didier Lombard	Chief Executive of Orange S.A. February 2011 – April 2022	Succeeded by Christel Heydemann
