= Jean-Bernard Lévy =

French businessman

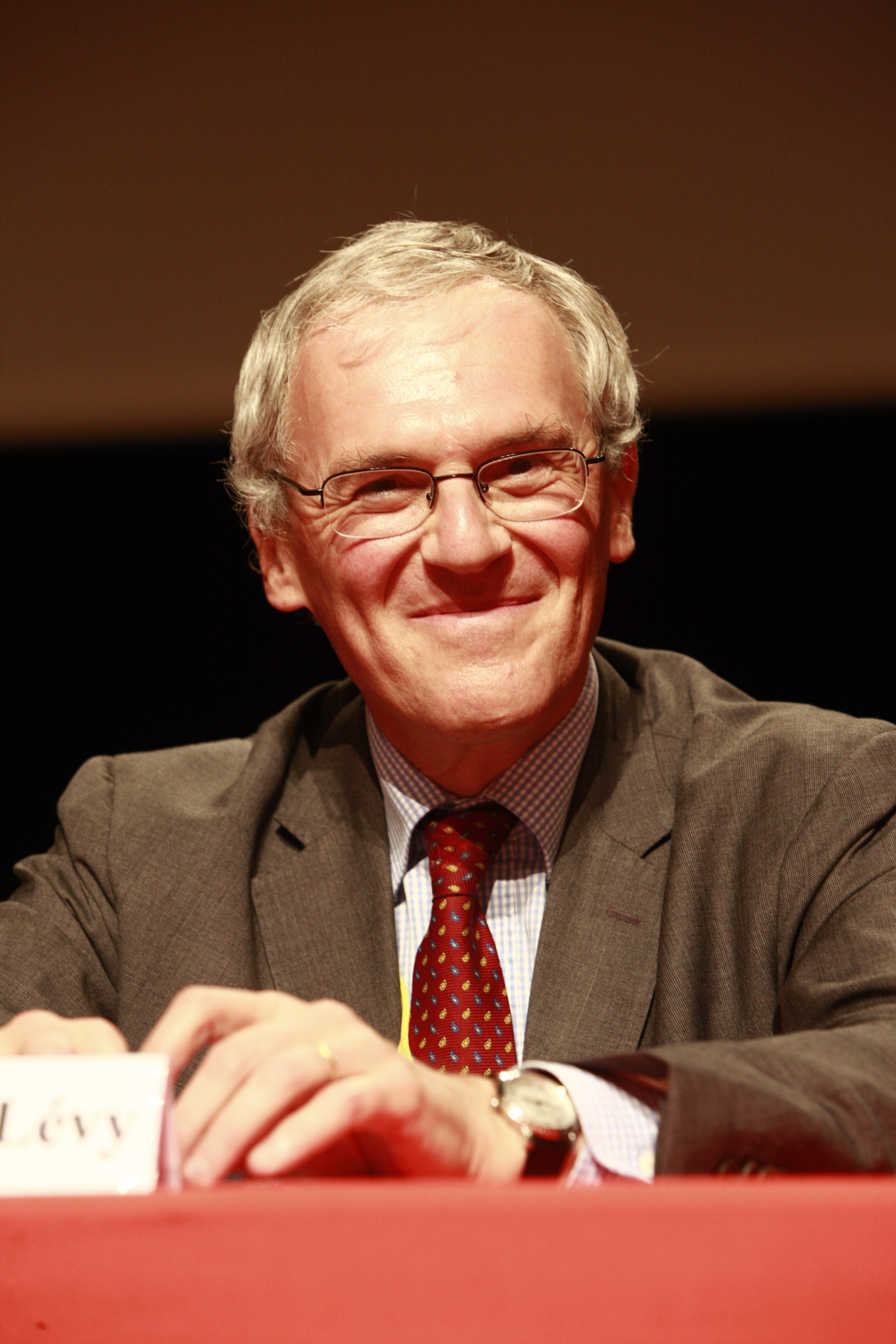
- Jean-Bernard Lévy in 2008
- Born: 18 March 1955 (age 71); Suresnes, France
- Education: Lycée Pasteur
- Alma mater: École Polytechnique; Télécom ParisTech
- Occupation: CEO EDF

Jean-Bernard Lévy (born 18 March 1955) is a French businessman, and was the CEO and chairman of EDF.

== Early life ==
Born on 18 March 1955, the son of a doctor, Lévy attended the Lycée Pasteur in Neuilly-sur-Seine. His parents sent him to England for a year to learn English, at St Martin's preparatory school in Northwood, Middlesex. He then studied at the École Polytechnique, and from 1973 the École nationale supérieure des télécommunications.

== Career ==
=== Early career ===
Lévy started his career as an engineer at France Telecom in 1979, in Angers. In 1982, he joined the Directorate General of Telecommunications within the PTT France, responsible for the management of senior staff and budgets, then promoted to deputy chief of staff.

=== Career in the public sector ===
In 1986, Lévy moved to Ministry of Posts, Telegraphs, and Telephones under secretary of state Gérard Longuet, acting as technical advisor and consultant for international affairs and industry. After a period at Matra Space as director of communications satellites, after the return to power of the Socialist Party, he returned to the French civil service under government under Longuet as his executive secretary, retaining the position in the Ministry of Industry, Posts and Telecommunications and Foreign Trade under Jose Rossi.

=== Career in the private sector ===
Appointed Group Director of Matra-Hachette from 1994, Lévy became president and CEO of Matra Communication from 1995 to 1998. He then became managing partner of Oddo & Cie until 2002, when merged to become Pinatton Corporate he chaired the senior management team.

Appointed CEO of Vivendi in 2002, he became chairman of the executive board in 2005. In this capacity, he has hence chaired the supervisory board of Viroxis since 2007, and Activision Blizzard since 2009. In June 2012 Lévy left Vivendi due to a clash of views with the chairman Jean-Rene Fourtou and a clash over views on the company's future strategy.

In December 2012, Lévy was appointed as the CEO of Thales Group.

In October 2014, he replaced Henri Proglio as the CEO of Électricité de France. His period as CEO proved difficult, with declining profits and EDF's market value halving by March 2016, when the chief financial officer resigned over investment decisions.

== Other activities ==
=== Corporate boards ===
- Société Générale, independent member of the board of directors (since 2009)
- Vinci, member of the board of directors (2007–2015)
- DCNS, member of the supervisory board (2013–2014)
- Viroxis, chairman of the supervisory board (2007–2014)
- Maroc Telecom, deputy chairman of the supervisory board (2007–2012)
- Cegetel, member of the supervisory board (-2008)
- NBC Universal, member of the board of directors (2004–2012)

=== Non-profit organizations ===
- Institut Télécom, chairman of the board (since 2009)
- Pasteur Institute, member of the board of directors (since 2007)

== Recognition ==
Lévy was appointed a Chevalier of the Légion d'honneur, and an Officier of the Ordre national du Mérite.

Business positions
Preceded by Luc Vigneron	CEO of Thales Group; 2012–2014	Succeeded by Patrice Caine
Preceded by Henri Proglio	CEO of EDF; 2014–present	Succeeded by Incumbent
