= Nexity =

French real estate services company

Nexity SA
- Type: Société anonyme
- Traded as: Euronext: NXI; CAC Small
- ISIN: FR0010112524
- Industry: Real estate development Real estate services
- Founded: 2000 (Note: Date since when it used the name Nexity.)
- Headquarters: Paris, France
- Area served: Europe
- Key people: Alain Dinin (chairman and CEO)
- Revenue: €2.6 billion (2011)
- Operating income: €113.53 million (2011)
- Net income: €58.15 million (2011)
- Total assets: €4.27 billion (2011)
- Total equity: €1.68 billion (2011)
- Website: Nexity.fr

Nexity is a French company that focuses on real estate development and the provision of related services. The company was founded in 2000 in Paris by Stéphane Richard and Alain Dinin.

Nexity operates as a real estate development company in Europe. Its working areas include residential properties, office buildings, offices, business parks, warehouses, distribution centers, office facilities, and hotels. This is carried out through several divisions.

== History ==
=== Beginnings: the Arnault family ===
In 1971, Bernard Arnault started to work in his family business, the industrial and public works construction company Ferret-Savinel, owned by his father, Jean Léon Arnault. There he began to develop real estate activities. In 1974, he convinced his father, then CEO, to change the focus of the company, sell the division of industrial construction to Quillery and use the money to enter fully into the business of the real estate. Following that sale, Ferret-Savinel changed its name, becoming Ferinel, and, focused on the real estate market, began increasing its portfolio. In 1988, following this success, the headquarters were transferred from Roubaix to Paris and the real estate branch was renamed George V Group.

=== CGE steps up ===
The Compagnie Générale des Eaux (CGE) was established in the mid-19th century in order to provide water supply services to France's industrial cities. For the early 20th century, CGE was already one of France's largest private companies.

Through the first half of the century, CGE remained focused on its core water utilities operations. In the 1960s, however, CGE launched a new diversification strategy that led it into a variety of new markets over the next two decades, including the construction and real estate sales and development sectors. In 1979, the company increased this activity with the acquisition of Maison Phenix, a leading real state company. In 1988, CGE made another important purchase: obtaining the construction company Société Générale d'Entreprise (the future Vinci). In the 90s, during the French real estate crisis, CGE gathered all its residential real estate and development activities in a new subsidiary, called MI SA, which soon begun to be the leader of the French housing market.

In 1995, CGE bought the George V real estate division from Groupe Arnault.

=== CGE restructure: CGIS era ===
CGE became a company, with a wide range of activities (construction, telecommunications, pay television, facilities management, the operation of amusement parks, and others), but the incompatibility between its real estate and construction components led it into a crisis in the mid-1990s. CGE was restructured and the construction sector was formed into a separate company, Vinci. In 1996, the real estate branch was also reorganised into a sole subsidiary, Compagnie Générale d'Immobilier et de Services (CGIS). The lack of coordination between different areas, however, continued. CGIS had to sell many assets to stay afloat and CGE finally decided to separate from the real estate area, adopt the name Vivendi, and refocus itself as a media and communications firm. CGIS and MI were apart soon after.

=== European expansion and refocus: Nexity era ===
As a new independent company, CGIS difficulties continued. It sold its hotels to Accor and Pierre & Vacances and a number of its La Défense buildings to Unibail. In 2000, CGIS was sold in a management buyout backed by CDC Ixis Capital, LBO France, and Lehman Brothers, changing its name to Nexity. In 2001, the Spanish subsidiary was created (even though operations there were made with French property since the 1990s), as well as the Portuguese]. In 2002, Nexity Belgium was established. In 2003, Nexity separated itself from its engineering services branch, Cotebo, in order to focus on property services and development. In January 2004, it strengthened its relatively weak real estate services sector with the purchase of Saggel.

In July 2007, the Nexity shareholders approved the issuance of 19997501 shares, representing a 38.2 percent stake, for the Caisse Nationale des Caisses d'Epargne et de Prévoyance (CNCE), through the Groupe Caisse d'Epargne (GCE), in exchange of a 25 percent of Crédit Foncier de France, 31.9 percent of Eurosic and 100 percent of CGE Immobilier services division, including Lamy. Later, CNCE (currently Groupe BPCE) expanded its stake to 41.4 percent.

In January 2009, Nexity sold its stake in Crédit Foncier to CNCE by 540 million euros.

=== Restructuring and refocus ===
Beginning in 2023, Nexity began restructuring its operations in response to a downturn in the French real estate market, with the company seeking to reduce debt and refocus its activities on property development and urban regeneration. In April 2024, Nexity completed the sale of its property management business for individuals to investment firm Bridgepoint, based on an enterprise value of €440 million.

As part of the restructuring, Nexity also announced a redundancy plan in 2024 affecting nearly 500 positions. The plan was expected to produce €45 million in annual cost savings, while broader cost-reduction measures were expected to reduce the company's cost base by approximately €95 million. In early 2025, the company launched "New Nexity", a simplified regional organization focused on its roles as a planner, developer and operator.

=== Divisions ===
==== Nexity Enterprises ====
This division specializes in the development and renovation of skyscrapers and similar structures.

==== Geprim ====
Geprim centers on the development of warehouses, distribution centers and mixed-use units.

==== Nexity Services ====
Nexity Services provides services during every stage of a project design, purchase, daily management, renovation and sale.
