= Joint European Disruptive Initiative =

Tech-focused venture capital organization

- Type: Funding agency
- Headquarters: Paris, France
- President: André Loesekrug-Pietri
- Website: https://www.jedi.foundation

The Joint European Disruptive Initiative (JEDI) is a European funding agency aiming at promoting disruptive technologies. It funds innovation in different "missions" (environment and energy, healthcare, education, digital, space, and oceans), with the goal of bringing "Europe in a leadership position in breakthrough technologies". It organizes scientific competitions focused on disruptive technologies. JEDI also makes policy recommendations to strengthen European technology sovereignty. As of 2024, JEDI was funding the projects of over 6,000 researchers in 29 countries across Europe and the world. It is operated independently from any European governments with funding from foundations, companies, individuals and public institutions.

JEDI was inspired by DARPA (Defense Advanced Research Projects Agency), the technology research and development agency of the United States Department of Defense. JEDI calls itself a "precursor" to a European advanced research projects agency.

== Research on COVID-19 ==
The Joint European Disruptive Initiative launched its first "Darpa-type GrandChallenge" on COVID-19 on May 5, 2020. The competition consisted in screening "billions of molecules with blocking interactions on SARS-CoV-2" to develop a drug against the coronavirus — with each participant having to use at least three different calculation methods for the simulations. The foundation claims to have had approximately 54 billions of molecules screened and 878 of them being synthesized. A paper published in Nature showed that the protein PDB 6W9C was one of the most used in silico drug design against COVID-19.
