= EDF Fenice =

Edison Next, formerly known as EDF Fenice, is an ESCO — energy service company providing energy efficiency and environmental services to industrial and public entities. It designs, sets up, manages, maintains and optimizes customers’ energy facilities, so as to reduce the productive costs of energy-intensive companies. For now Edison Next operates 85 sites in Italy, Spain, Russia.

== History ==
The company was founded at the beginning of the 1990s in Italy as part of FIAT corporation. In 2001 it was bought by the EDF Group. Since then Edison Next grew rapidly to a multinational company with subsidiaries in Spain (Fenice Iberica), Poland (Fenice Poland) and Russia (FENICE RUS).

== Know-how and competences ==
1) Ecology and environmental service (building audit, industrial waste management, monitoring of industrial sites/civil engineering, sites remediation projects); 2) Energy efficiency service (electrical substations, combined heat and power/heat, cooling and power plants/cycle gas turbines, thermal power plants, chilling plants, compressor rooms, pumps, cooling towers, primary water treatment plants, wastewater treatment, heat recovering plants); 3) Education (European Energy Efficiency Campus)

== Key figures ==
The company has 500 million euro of annual revenue, 80 million euro of annual investments (CAPEX serving customers). The number of employees is more than 1960 (information as of December, 2013).
