= District energy =

District Energy refers to energy production and/or storage and distribution in a distributed manner, and may refer to:

== Thermal energy ==
- District heating - the means of providing heating for a cluster of buildings
- District cooling - the means of providing cooling for a cluster of buildings

== Electricity ==
- Distributed generation - the means of producing electric energy in a distributed manner
