= Veolia Environmental Services =

French waste management company

- Type: Division
- Industry: Management and treatment of waste
- Headquarters: Paris, France
- Key people: Denis Gasquet, CEO of Veolia Environmental Services and Senior Executive Vice President and COO of Veolia Environnement
- Revenue: €9.02 billion – 2009
- Number of employees: 77,864 (31 December 2009)
- Parent: Veolia Environment

Veolia Environmental Services (in French Veolia Propreté), formerly Onyx Environnement, is a division of Veolia Environnement. It employs nearly 78,000 staff, has operations in 35 countries around the world, and generated revenues of nearly €9.02 billion in 2009.

It specialises in the management, treatment and disposal of waste, as well as the recycling, reclamation and re-use of waste products. Veolia Environmental Services manages solid and liquid waste, as well as hazardous and non-hazardous waste materials.

== History ==
The businesses predecessor, the Compagnie Générale des Eaux (CGE) was created by imperial decree in 1853 and in 1953 they began to collect household waste. SARP Industry was founded in 1975 to treat hazardous waste.

CGE took full control of the Compagnie Générale de Chauffe (CGC) in 1980, a company that they had operated incineration plants with since 1967. In addition, CGE also assumed control of the Compagnie Générale d'Entreprises Automobiles (CGEA), a business active in household waste management and in urban transportation.

CGE opened its first waste drop-off centres in 1986. Three years later, it created the Onyx Environnement brand, which unified all of CGEA's waste management activities.

In 1998, the parent company CGE was renamed to Vivendi. The following year Vivendi Environnement consolidated the environmental activities of Vivendi. Vivendi Environnement was divested by Vivendi between 2000 and 2002. Vivendi Environnement became Veolia Environnement in 2003, and two years later Onyx became Veolia Environmental Services.

In 2006, the Italian utility Enel, alongside Veolia, launched a takeover bid for Suez. Opposed to the entry of a foreign group, the French government orchestrated a merger between Suez and the state-owned operator Gaz de France, resulting in the creation of GDF Suez.

In 2009, the company collected 42.7 million tonnes of waste, treated 62.5 million tonnes, and recycled 12.7 million tonnes. Veolia sold its US solid waste business to Advanced Disposal in 2012.

In 2015, Veolia North America was paid $40,000 to produce a report on Flint, Michigan's water supply. Veolia Vice President Rob Nicholas stated that the water was safe to drink and met state and federal standards. The report received additional scrutiny in 2016 after a state of emergency was declared over toxic levels of chemicals detected in Flint's water supply. A Veolia spokesperson asserted that testing for lead and copper levels was beyond the scope of their work.

=== Boycotts ===
Veolia has been the target of boycotts and divestment campaigns, primarily by pro-Palestinian groups. In 2013, a "Dump Veolia" campaign organized by the St. Louis Palestine Solidarity Committee succeeded in halting approval of a multi-million dollar contract with Veolia. The pro-Palestinian group opposed contracting with Veolia on three primary human rights grounds. They allege that:

- Veolia Environmental Services-Israel, a subsidiary, manages the Tovla landfill in the Jordan Valley.
- The subsidiary Connex-Israel "confiscated land with portions closed entirely to Palestinians".
- Veolia Transport's development of the Jerusalem Light Rail system.

In 2012, Veolia withdrew from a £4.7 Billion contract in north London, under pressure from a 2-year campaign by the No to Veolia Action Group (No2VAG). In addition to the objections of the "Dump Veolia" campaign, No2VAG also highlighted what it described as racist literature in Veolia's advertisements for drivers, which required completion of military service and a "mother tongue" of Hebrew.

Several university organizations have supported anti-Veolia protests and boycotts, including at Oberlin College and at the University of Sheffield. In 2013, the Sheffield Palestinian Solidarity Group succeeded in petitioning the university to end their waste management contract with Veolia.

== Activities ==
Veolia Environmental Services collects, recycles and treats waste. Its activities cover liquid waste, solid waste, hazardous or non-hazardous waste, and refuse collected from household and industrial sources.

=== Company services ===
For private companies, its services include:

- Management and exploitation of waste, including collection and treatment of hazardous waste
- Operation and maintenance of chemical, petrochemical, metallurgical and automotive plants and equipment, including high-pressure cleaning services and cryogenics

In 2009, Veolia Environmental Services had 819,000 business customers in the world.

=== Public authority services ===
For local authorities and boroughs Veolia Environmental Services collects and sorts waste, transports it to treatment subsidiaries and plants, and operates landfill sites.

Nottinghamshire County Council planned to appoint Veolia Environmental Services to operate a waste incinerator at Rainworth, Nottinghamshire, in 2006, but local opposition resulted in planning permission being declined in 2011. In connection with this local opposition, a request for information about Nottinghamshire's "public finance initiative" (PFI) contracts with Veolia Environmental Services resulted in an investigation by the Information Commissioner's Office and an order that the County Council must release certain information in compliance with the Environmental Information Regulations 2004. Veolia had requested the documents be kept confidential in accordance with the relevant provisions in the regulations.

Examples of contracts involving Veolia Environmental Services in 2010:

- A 6-year contract to recover energy from compost and recyclable materials from household waste in the Angers region of France. The contract was awarded by the Angers Loire metropolitan area, and is worth over €45 million.
- The Hong Kong Government contracted Veolia Environnement to design, build and operate a sludge treatment plant. Veolia Environmental Services will operate the facility jointly with Veolia Water. The contract is worth €20 million per year, and the site is designed to produce 20 MW of electricity through energy recovery techniques.
- VES has a long-term contract in Sheffield, South Yorkshire, in partnership with the local council, operating an energy recovery facility.

=== Sorting and recycling ===
Veolia Environmental Services operates 352 centres for sorting and recycling. It treats and recycles waste to produce raw materials for industry. This includes collecting paper, cardboard, glass, plastics, wood, metal and waste electrical and electronic items.

=== Treatment and recovery of waste ===
A number of Veolia Environmental Services are based on specific treatment and waste recovery techniques and technologies.

- Treatment of hazardous waste: incineration of organic liquid waste, recycling of solvents etc.
- Storage and energy exploitation of non-hazardous waste. In 2008, Veolia Environmental Services launched a pilot facility for the production of biofuels from biogas emitted by non-hazardous waste stored at Claye-Souilly near Paris, France. The pilot has been fully operational since September 2009, and produces enough biomethane to power Veolia Environnement's fleet of vehicles serving the Claye-Souilly site, resulting in a net savings of 882 metric tons of CO_{2} per year.
- Treatment of urban and industrial sewage and its re-use in agriculture.
- Incineration and energy exploitation of non-hazardous solids for urban heating networks.

In 2009, Veolia sold:

- €5.1 million MWh of electricity
- 3.2 million MWh of thermal energy

=== Hazardous waste treatment ===
Veolia Environmental Services operates facilities for the treatment of hazardous waste materials. These include toxic liquid wastes, battery acids and fluids, solvents and metals. It has 71 physical-chemical hazardous waste treatment facilities. As part of its hazardous waste treatment activities, Veolia Environmental Services was contracted by the Ukrainian Environment Ministry to safely dispose of 1,000 tonnes of pesticide.

== Veolia Environmental Services worldwide ==
Veolia Environmental Services is located in 32 countries around the world:

- Europe (77% of revenues): France, UK, Ireland, Switzerland, Belgium, Germany, Italy, Spain, Denmark, Czech Republic, Poland, Slovakia, Hungary, Ukraine, Lithuania, Estonia, Latvia.
- North America (14% of revenues) and South America : United States, Canada, Brazil, Mexico
- Africa, Middle East, South America (2% of revenues): Morocco, Tunisia, Egypt, Israel, Qatar, UAE, Mexico,
- Asia-Pacific (7% of revenues): China, Taiwan, Singapore, South Korea, Australia.
