= Catherine MacGregor =

French businesswoman (born 1972)

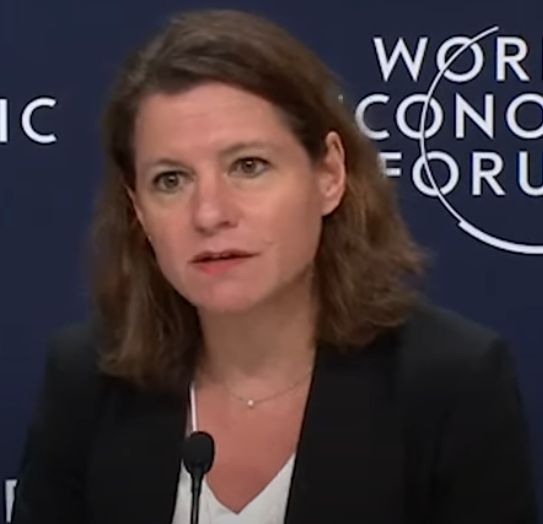
- Speaking at the 2022 World Economic Forum
- Born: Catherine Fiamma; 7 August 1972 (age 53); Morocco
- Education: Bachelor of Engineering
- Alma mater: École Centrale Paris
- Occupations: CEO, Engie
- Employer: Engie
- Children: Two daughters

Catherine MacGregor, (née Fiamma; born 7 August 1972) is a French businesswoman and engineer. She is the Chief Executive Officer (CEO) of Engie since 1 January 2021.

== Early life and education ==
Catherine MacGregor was born Catherine Fiamma in Morocco. Her parents, both mathematics teachers with Corsican and Basque roots, raised her in Casablanca until she was 14. She attended Lycée Lyautey there, and later moved to Paris with her mother. She pursued higher studies in the field of energy and engineering, earning a bachelor’s degree in engineering from École Centrale Paris in 1995.

== Career ==
She joined Schlumberger in 1995 and remained for 23 years. Her roles included being the group's HR director. From 2013 to 2016, she led operations in Europe & Africa. In 2017, she became the President of drilling activities in London. She was keen on using 3D seismic technology for enhanced oil recovery while at Schlumberger.

In 2020, she became the President of Technip Energies (based in Paris), a spin-off from TechnipFMC. Her tenure saw a focus being provided on energy transition.

The board of the French energy company Engie named her as the next CEO on 2 October 2020, and she assumed the position on 1 January 2021. During that period, as her predecessor Isabelle Kocher, she held the distinction of being the sole female CEO in France's CAC-40 stock index until Christel Heydemann joined as the CEO of Orange S.A. The French Finance Minister, Bruno Le Maire, described it as 'regrettable' that more women were not in similar positions alongside her.

== Other appointments ==
- Advisory member of the Board of Directors of Toulouse School of Economics
- Director of French Association of Private Enterprises (AFEP)
- Member of the Executive Committee of the World Business Council for Sustainable Development (Switzerland)
- Director and member of the Association Française des Entreprises pour l'Environnement (EpE)
- Board member of Microsoft

== Awards and recognitions ==
She was awarded the "Chevalier de la Légion d'Honneur" (Knight of the Legion of Honour) on 30 December 2020, in recognition of her role as the CEO of an energy industrial group and her 25 years of service.

In 2023, she ranked 26th in Forbes list of "World's 100 most powerful women".

She was ranked 25th on Fortune's list of Most Powerful Women in 2023.

== Personal life ==
She met her former husband, who is Scottish, in Aberdeen during her time working at Schlumberger. They have two daughters.

Business positions
Preceded by Isabelle Kocher	CEO of Engie; 2021–present	Succeeded by Incumbent
