= Électricité de France =

French multinational electric utility company

- Tour EDF, La Défense, near Paris, where EDF's commerce division is located
- Type: State-owned
- Traded as: Euronext Paris: EDF (2005–2023); CAC Next 20 component (2005–2023)
- Industry: Electric utility
- Predecessor: Compagnie d'Électricité de l'Ouest Parisien
- Founded: 1946; 80 years ago
- Founder: Government of France under the direction of Provisional Government Minister for Industrial Production Marcel Paul
- Headquarters: 22 avenue de Wagram, Paris, France
- Area served: Worldwide
- Key people: Bernard Fontana (chairman and CEO since March 2025)
- Products: Electricity generation, transmission and distribution; commercial energy trading
- Revenue: ▼€139.7 billion (2023)
- Operating income: ▲€39.9 billion (2023)
- Net income: ▲€10.0 billion (2023)
- Total assets: ▼€364.8 billion (2023)
- Owner: French state (100%)
- Number of employees: 165,000 (2021)
- Subsidiaries: Dalkia; Edison S.p.A.; EDF Energy; EDF Renewables; Luminus; Arabelle Solutions
- Website: edf.fr

Électricité de France (French pronunciation: [elɛktʁisite də fʁɑ̃s]; lit. 'Electricity of France'), commonly known as EDF, is a French multinational electric utility company owned by the government of France. Headquartered in Paris, with €139.7 billion in sales in 2023, EDF operates a diverse portfolio of at least 120 gigawatts of generation capacity in Europe, South America, North America, Asia, the Middle East, and Africa. In 2009, EDF was the world's largest producer of electricity. Its 56 active nuclear reactors in France are spread out over 18 sites (18 nuclear power plants). They comprise 32 reactors of 900 MW_{e}, 20 reactors of 1,300 MW_{e}, and 4 reactors of 1,450 MW_{e}, all PWRs.

== History ==
EDF was created through a Nationalization Law on 8 April 1946 by the 1945 parliament, from the merging of various divided actors. It was mandated to manage electricity production, transmission, and distribution as well as the import and export of electrical energy. The administrative supervision of the EDF electricity board was assigned to the Ministry for Industry, P&T, and Tourism.

EDF led France's post-war energy growth, with a unique focus on civil nuclear energy, through reconstruction and further industrialization within the Trente Glorieuses, being a flagship of France's new industrial landscape. In 2004, following integration into the European Common Market, EDF was partly privatized, as the government of France retained 84% equity. In 2017 EDF took over the majority of the reactor business Areva, in a French government-sponsored restructuring. That same year, following a wish to divest from nuclear energy, the possible closure of 17 of EDF's French nuclear power reactors by 2025 was announced. By 2022, this decision had been reversed, with the administration of president Emmanuel Macron announcing plans for a "nuclear renaissance", beginning with the projected construction of 6 EPR model 2 reactors with an option for 8 further reactors. Meanwhile, construction is ongoing on EPR model 1 reactors in France and Britain.

Following privatization, decades of under-investment, and the 2021–2022 global energy crisis, the French government announced the full renationalisation of the company for an estimated cost of €5 billion, which it completed on 8 June 2023.

== The EDF group ==
=== Activities ===
EDF specialises in electricity, from engineering to distribution. The company's operations include the following: electricity generation and distribution; power plant design, construction and dismantling; energy trading; and transport. It is active in such power generation technologies as nuclear power, hydropower, wind power, solar energy, biomass, geothermal energy and fossil-fired energy.

In November 2022, EDF agreed to acquire GE Steam Power's nuclear activities, which include the manufacture of non-nuclear equipment for new nuclear power plants including steam turbines and the maintenance and upgrade of existing nuclear power plants outside America. The acquisition was completed on 31 May 2024, and GE Power's nuclear business is now known as Arabelle Solutions.

In July 2025, EDF withdrew from bidding on new nuclear projects abroad, other than in nearby EU countries, to concentrate on a future large domestic construction programme.

==== Distribution network (RTE and Enedis) ====
The electricity network in France is composed of the following:

- a high- and very-high-voltage transmission system (100,000 km; 60,000 miles of lines). This part of the system is managed by RTE (electricity transmission system operator) who acts as an independent administrator of infrastructure, although it is a subsidiary of EDF;
- a low- and medium-voltage distribution system (1,300,000 km; 800,000 miles of lines), maintained by Enedis (ex-ERDF), formerly known as EDF-Gaz de France Distribution. Enedis (ex-ERDF) was spun off from EDF-Gaz de France Distribution in 2008 as part of the process of total separation of the activities of EDF and GDF Suez.

=== Organization ===
==== Head office ====
EDF head office, 22–30 avenue de Wagram, Paris 8th arr.

The EDF head office is located along Avenue de Wagram in the 8th arrondissement of Paris. The EDF head office is shared between several EDF sites in Greater Paris.

==== The directorate ====
- Chairman and CEO: Bernard Fontana (since 2025).

=== Business ===
- As a major player in energy transition, the EDF Group is an integrated energy company active in all businesses: generation, transmission, distribution, energy trading, energy sales and energy services, and is gaining over 143.5 billion euros, with over 37.6 million customers worldwide, in 2015.
- In April 2024, EDF reorganised its nuclear business in preparation for planned government investment to construct six new EPR2 reactors to operate from 2035.

==== Statistics ====
- Customers: 37.6 million worldwide in 2015.
- 2009 Turnover: €63.34 billion (23% from France) – €41.82 billion in 2002.
- Profit: €3.96 billion in 2010 – €3.96 billion in 2009.
- Net profit: €1 billion in 2010 – €3.92 billion in 2009.
- Net Debt: €34.4 billion in 2010 – €42.5 billion in 2009.
- Revenue: €75 billion in 2015.
- Energy generation: 619.3 TWh in 2015.
- Employees: 165,200 worldwide.

==== Main partners and affiliates ====
- In Europe:
  - United Kingdom: 100% EDF Energy, acquired British Energy, which generates about 20 percent of British electricity, mainly from 8 nuclear plants, 100% EDF Trading
  - Austria: 100% Vero
  - Belgium: 100% Luminus
  - France: 100% of EDF Énergies Nouvelles which in turn owns EDF-RE, formerly EnXco in US, 74.86% Électricité de Strasbourg, 67% Dalkia Investments, 51% TIRU, 50% Cerga, 50% Edenkia, 50% Dalkia International, 50% SIIF Énergies, 34% Dalkia Hdg
  - Germany: 100% EDF Ostalbkreis, 100% EDF Weinsberg, 50% RKI
  - Hungary: 95.56% BE Zrt
  - Ireland: 100% (as EDF Renewables Ireland and subsidiary Wexford Solar Energy)
  - Italy: Edison S.p.A. (99.4% of the capital), 100% EDF Energia Italia which sells directly 2.2 TWh to Italy, 100% Edison Next, 40% Finei, 30% ISE
  - The Netherlands: 100% Finelex, 50% Cinergy Holding
  - Poland: 76.63% Rybnik, 66.08% ECK, 49.19% ECW, 35.42% Kogeneracja, 24.61% Zielona Gora
  - Slovakia: 49% SSE
  - Spain: 100% EDF Iberica (EDF Península Ibérica, S.A)
  - Sweden: 100% Skandrenkraft, 36.32% Groupe Graninge
  - Switzerland: 50% Chatelot, 50% Emosson, 14.25% Groupe ATEL, 26.26% Motor Columbus
- In the Americas:
  - United States: 100% EDF Inc., which controls fully or partially Unistar Nuclear Energy (100%), EDF-RE, formerly EnXco (100%), EDF Trading North America (100%)
  - Argentina: 25% Edenor, 45% Sodemsa, 22.95% Edemsa
  - Brazil: 100% Lidil, 90% Norte Fluminense
- In Asia:
  - China: 85% Synergie, 60% Figlec, 35% Datang Sanmenxia Power Company, 19.6% Shandong Zhonghua Power Company
  - Vietnam: 56.25% Meco
- In Africa:
  - Côte d'Ivoire: 50% Azito O&M, 32.85% Azito Energie

== History ==
=== Status of EDF ===
EDF was founded on 8 April 1946, as a result of the nationalisation of around 1,700 smaller energy producers, transporters and distributors by the Minister of Industrial Production Marcel Paul. Mostly a state-owned EPIC, it became the main electricity generation and distribution company in France, enjoying a monopoly in electricity generation, although some small local distributors were retained by the nationalisation. This monopoly ended in 1999, when EDF was forced by a European Directive to open up 20% of its business to competitors.

Until 19 November 2004, EDF was a state-owned corporation, but became a limited-liability corporation under private law (société anonyme), after its status was changed by statute. The French government partially floated shares of the company on the Paris Stock Exchange in November 2005, although it retained almost 85% ownership as of the end of 2008.

On 22 November 2016, French competition regulators raided EDF offices, looking for evidence that EDF was abusing its dominant position to manipulate electricity prices and squeeze rivals.

=== Finances ===
Logo as of 2003

Between 2001 and 2003, EDF was forced to reduce its equity capital by €6.4 billion total because of the performance of subsidiaries in South America and Europe. In 2001, it also acquired a number of British energy companies, becoming the UK's biggest electricity supplier.

The company remains heavily in debt. Its profitability suffered during the recession which began in 2008. It made €3.9 billion in 2009, which fell to €1.02 billion in 2010, with provisions set aside amounting to €2.9 billion.

In January 2013 the company sold its 1.6% stake in U.S. utility Exelon for $470 million.

In March 2016 EDF's Chief Financial Officer, Thomas Piquemal, who had argued that the final investment decision on building Hinkley Point C nuclear power station should be delayed for three years, resigned. With EDF's market value halved over the preceding year, the cost of the Hinkley Point C project now exceeded the entire market capitalisation of EDF.

In March 2017 EDF offered a €4bn rights issue of new shares to increase capital availability, at a 34.5% discount. The French government committed to purchasing €3bn of the rights issue. Shares prices fell to an all-time low due to the heavy discount on new shares.

EDF's net debt at the end of 2018 was €33 billion, but with future obligations such as pension liabilities and costs for managing nuclear waste allowed for, the adjusted net debt was €70 billion. In order to improve EDF's finances, as of 2019 EDF has sold €10 billion of assets, with plans to sell a further €2 to €3 billion of assets by 2021, and shareholders have been allocated new shares rather than cash dividends. Bonds have been issued in Asian currencies to expand sources of funding. It has financial commitments for new builds at Flamanville and Hinkley Point C. EDF is committed to spending €49.4 billion by 2025 for life extension of its French nuclear reactor fleet, which as of 2019 has an average age of 33 years, to 50 years.

In December 2021, EDF had about €43 billion of debt, which investment analysts Morningstar expected to exceed €60bn by the end of 2022. EDF's credit rating was downgraded in February 2022.

In February 2024, EDF took a €12.9 billion impairment charge on cost overruns building the Hinkley Point C nuclear power station, and a further €1.1 billion later for inflation.

=== Energy policy ===
EDF produces its electricity primarily from nuclear power plants.

France is the world's largest user of nuclear power for electricity (78% of French production in 2007).

In May 2004, the French Interior Minister Nicolas Sarkozy reasserted, in front of the French Parliament, the primacy of nuclear power, much to the relief of labour unions of EDF. In this speech, the minister re-phrased the famous slogan, "We do not have oil, but we have ideas", by declaring: "We do not have oil, we do not have gas, we do not have coal, but we had ideas". Depleted uranium from reprocessing the spent fuel of the 58 French nuclear power plants were exported from Le Havre to Russia in the last years and stored in Seversk where it was enriched, and the new fuel was exported back to France.

In 2013 EDF acknowledged the difficulties it was having building the new EPR nuclear reactor design, with its head of production and engineering, Hervé Machenaud, saying EDF had lost its dominant international position in design and construction of nuclear power stations. In September 2015 EDF's chief executive Jean-Bernard Lévy stated that the design of a "New Model" EPR was being worked on, which will be easier to build, to be ready for orders from about 2020.

In 2016 EDF's chief executive Jean-Bernard Lévy stated that EDF's 2030 strategy increased the emphasis on renewable energy, with a 2030 goal of doubling renewable energy capacity worldwide. He stated "I am convinced that we will still have a centralised and secure system in the future but it will be supplemented by a more intermittent and local decentralised system, in which customers will take charge of their consumption. In readiness for this, we must press on with research into electricity storage and smart electricity systems".

=== EDF spying conviction ===
In 2011, a French court fined EDF €1.5m and jailed two senior employees for spying on Greenpeace, including hacking into Greenpeace's computer systems. Greenpeace was awarded €500,000 in damages. Although EDF claimed that a security firm had only been employed to monitor Greenpeace, the court disagreed, jailing the head and deputy head of EDF's nuclear security operation for three years each. Two employees of the security firm, Kargus, run by a former member of France's secret services, received sentences of three and two years respectively. Charges were mostly dismissed in appeal in 2013.

=== DDoS attack on EDF site ===
EDF's website was brought down by DDoS attacks three times in 2011, twice in April and once later in June.

The attacks were claimed by the hacktivist group Anonymous. Three men were later arrested and interviewed on charges of "obstructing functionality of a data processing service", "fraudulent access of a data processing service" and "participation in an association formed with the aim of preparing such infractions".

Motivations for the attack were thought to relate to the Fukushima nuclear accident in Japan. Unlike Switzerland and Germany, which plan to close down all nuclear reactors at the end of their lifespan, the government of France had no such plans to move away from nuclear power and three months after the Fukushima meltdown, stated a budget increase for nuclear power.

The downtime of the EDF website cost the company an estimated €162,000.

=== Suing No Dash For Gas ===
In February 2013 EDF Energy sought an estimated £5 million in damages from environmental activists from the No Dash for Gas campaign that occupied the EDF-owned West Burton CCGT power station in October 2012.

It is unusual in the UK for companies to seek damages from protesters. On 13 March 2013, EDF dropped their lawsuit against the protesters, after agreeing a permanent injunction against protesters entering EDF sites.

=== Absorption of Areva reactor business ===
In 2017 EDF took over the majority of the reactor business of Areva, excluding the fuel business, in a French government sponsored restructuring following financial and technical problems at Areva due to the building of new EPR nuclear plants. The reactor business has been named Framatome.

In October 2019 French Finance Minister Bruno Le Maire released an audit report on the construction of the heavily delayed and nearly four times over-budget Flamanville 3 EPR development, started by Areva in 2007. The Finance Minister demanded EDF present within a month an action plan for the project, calling it a "failure for the entire French nuclear industry".

=== Effect of coronavirus pandemic ===
In April 2020 EDF estimated the economic slowdown due to the coronavirus pandemic could potentially reduce electricity consumption in France by 20%. EDF estimated annual nuclear output in France would be about 300 TWh in 2020 and 330-360 TWh in 2021 and 2022, down from a pre-coronavirus estimate of 375-390 TWh. Some nuclear reactors will likely be taken offline in the summer of 2020. EDF announced it had withdrawn financial targets for 2020 and 2021. A delay of planned 10-year reactor upgrades this year may be necessary.

To mitigate the impact EDF is targeting €500 million of cost savings to 2022, and aims to sell €3 billion of assets to 2022.

=== 2021 stress corrosion cracking crisis ===
In October 2021, stress corrosion cracking in stainless steel safety system piping was discovered, eventually requiring rolling fleet-wide shutdowns for inspections and repair during 2022 and 2023. This reduced electricity production in 2022 to 279 TWh, 82 TWh less than expected, with a continuing shortfall in 2023. To meet demand, EDF had to buy electricity on the European market at high prices, costing an estimated €29 billion to June 2023.

In late May 2022, when 12 nuclear reactors were offline, EDF increased the estimated earnings reductions for the inspections and repairs to €18.5 billion.

=== 2021 global energy crisis ===
EDF had to sell a further 20 TWh of power to other domestic suppliers at a reduced price due to the government response to the 2021 global energy crisis. In January 2022, EDF calculated that the increase in reduced price wholesale supply would cost it €8.4 billion (£7 billion), and it withdrew its profit guidance. The EDF share price fell considerably. EDF's debt is about €41 billion, and Fitch Ratings lowered EDF's credit rating.

=== 2022 Re-nationalization ===
On 6 July 2022, French prime minister Élisabeth Borne announced that "the French government is aiming for a full nationalization of" EDF. Borne "vowed" to limit the impact of the rise in energy prices through the state having "full control over...electricity production and performance.” Borne told parliament, "we must ensure our sovereignty in the face of...the colossal challenges to come." Earlier in 2022, President Emmanuel Macron had "suggested" a renationalization of EDF as well as a "big expansion of nuclear energy in the coming decades" however, in 2021, he had to scrap an "overhaul" of EDF, codenamed "Project Hercules," that would have placed EDF's profitable renewables sector in a new company, due to opposition by unions and objections raised by the European Commission.

In March 2023, EDF created the Nuward subsidiary to design and manufacture a small modular reactor, for construction from 2030. In July 2024, EDF announced it was discontinuing the existing design, and will work on an SMR design based on existing rather than innovative technologies, following discussions with prospective SMR customers. In January 2025, EDF announced that the new Nuward conceptual design would be completed by mid-2026 to come to market in the 2030s, with an output of about 400 MWe and usable heat output 100 MWt.

In May 2024, EDF raised a loan of €5.8 billion over 3–5 years to finance the life extension of its older 900 MWe reactors by 10 years beyond 40 years. The loan is part of EDF's Green Financing Framework which is in accord with the EU taxonomy for sustainable activities which allows for private-public financing.

== Renewable energies ==
=== Plug-in hybrids and V2G ===
EDF has developed recharging points for the Toyota Plug-in HV in France.

The French government has contributed $550 million to a partnership by Électricité de France with Renault-Nissan and with PSA Peugeot Citroen.

=== Photovoltaics ===
In 2018 EDF had plans to invest up to €25 billion in photovoltaics solar power generation, and introduce green electricity tariffs.

=== Carbon Intensity ===
year	Production (TWh)	Emission (Mt CO_{2})	kg CO_{2}/MWh
2002	650	91.35	141
2003	669	96.34	144
2004	647	95.74	148
2005	647	93.52	145
2006	655	93.35	142
2007	706	101.91	144
2008	704	103.79	147
2009	652	88.09	135

=== Tidal farms ===
- Paimpol–Bréhat tidal farm

== Competitors ==
As of 2017, EDF still held the business of 85.5% of France's residential customers, though on a slow downward trend.

=== Main competitors ===
Apart from foreign producers and distributors, there are some significant competitors of EDF in France, although their market share is weaker in comparison:

- Engie: the company formed after the merger of Gaz de France and Suez clearly intends to produce its own electricity, has bought stake in the future EPR nuclear reactors and is poised to become the most credible competitor of EDF in the newly liberalised French electricity market;
- SNET (Société nationale d'électricité et de thermique): This company is the successor of depleting coal companies and primarily produce thermal electricity (2.5 TWh). Its capital (81%) belonged predominantly to Collieries of France and with EDF. A portion of the capital (30%) was sold to Endesa, the main Spanish electricity producer, another portion of 35% was sold in 2004. As of 2008 Endesa holds 65% of the equity of the generating company Snet;
- CNR (Compagnie nationale du Rhône): the capital of which is predominantly public, the company exploits 19 hydroelectric plants installed on the banks of the Rhône. Its production of 19 TWh makes it the second largest French producer with 4% of the market. CNR signed a partnership agreement with Electrabel;
- SHEM (Société hydro-électrique du Midi): a subsidiary of SNCF, of which produces about one-third of the electricity used by SNCF. A partnership agreement was signed with Electrabel.

=== Locally controlled or between local councils ===
Among the other rivals of EDF, one can count a number of municipally governed companies, known under the generic term 'entreprises locales de distribution' ('local businesses of distribution'), who are electricity producers exploiting EDF's network.

The nationalisation of electricity and gas on 8 April 1946, which profoundly changed the French electrical and gas organization, had however acknowledged the right of villages to keep their role in the public distribution of electricity and gas.

In 1946, certain firms, villages or groups of villages, did not accept the proposal of nationalisation and created autonomous state controls (who held the monopoly of distribution, until 2004, in their area). To note, contrary to the initial idea, local controllers of electricity, have had, since 1946, the choice to continue to produce electricity. In fact, their production was rather marginal, except in Rhône-Alpes; having often preferred buying the majority of the electrical power from EDF. With the recent opening of the electricity market, local controllers are considering developing, augmenting and diversifying their own production, (e.g. Ouest Énergie, the subsidiary company of SIEDS) and/or diversifying their sources of supply.

To date, the number of local businesses of distribution is approximately 170 and holds 5% of the distribution of French electrical power in 2,500 villages. Created by local authorities, they serve about 3 million people and represent 7,000 jobs. Around thirty of them – 9 during creation in 1962 – are federated in a national entity known as ANROC.

Several departments are not, therefore, served entirely or partly by EDF, for instance:

- Deux-Sèvres, supplied by SIEDS: partnership between local councils of Electricity of Deux-Sèvres;
- Vienne, supplied by SIEEDV: partnership between local councils of Electricity and Works of the Department of Vienne;
- Charente-Maritime, supplied by SDEER: partnership of Electricity and Rural Works of the Department of Charente-Maritime;
- Gironde, supplied by Gironde Electricity. However, the company was sold to EDF at the beginning of 2000 because it could not financially maintain the damage of the severe weather of December 1999, on its network;
- Alsace;
- Rhône-Alpes.

=== Security ===
Enedis was one of the first companies to carry out preventive maintenance on these wooden poles, with the aim of safeguarding the safety of its personnel, in particular with the Polux tool, which has become its reference standard.

== See also ==
- Dirigisme
- Energy in France
- Groupe INTRA
- List of French companies
- List of multinational corporations
- Nuclear fuel cycle in France
