= Dalkia =

French energy company

- Type: Subsidiary
- Industry: Energy
- Founded: 1998; 28 years ago
- Headquarters: Saint-André-lez-Lille, France
- Key people: Sylvie Jéhanno (CEO)
- Revenue: €5,196 billion (2021)
- Operating income: €378 million (2021)
- Number of employees: 19,000 (2021)
- Parent: Électricité de France
- Website: dalkia.com

Dalkia is an energy service company, subsidiary of the EDF Group. Its two main businesses consist in making the most of local renewables and unlocking energy savings. Dalkia develops alternative renewables, such as biomass, geothermal, biogas and recovered energies.

The company generated €4 billion in revenues in 2017. It has approximately 16,000 employees and has been led by chairwoman and CEO Sylvie Jéhanno since January 2017.

== History ==
=== Origins ===
Former logotype before it became a subsidiary of EDF

Dalkia was originally known as the Compagnie Générale de Chauffe (CGC), founded in 1935. In 1967, Chauffage Service (founded in 1944) merged into CGC. In 1980, CGC was acquired by Compagnie Générale des Eau (CGE, later renamed Vivendi in 1998). CGC merged with Groupe Montenay in 1986 to form Compagnie Générale de Chauffe/Groupe Montenay, which was further merged in 1995 to become the Energy Services division of CGE.

=== Creation of Dalkia ===
In 1998, the CGE Energy Services division was renamed to Dalkia and continued to be a subsidiary of the newly renamed Vivendi. It signed an agreement with Électricité de France in 2000 to build an international presence and expand its range of services, hence becoming a jointly owned company. Dalkia also bought the Clemessy Group, which specialises in systems for automation, mechanisation and electronics.

Vivendi spun off its environmental division in 2002 called Vivendi Environnement, which was later renamed Veolia Environnement in 2003.

In 2008, Dalkia sold Clemessy and Crystal to Eiffage, an energy and construction company. In 2009, the Mitie Group PLC, a UK holding company that focuses on providing strategic outsourcing and asset management services, bought the facilities management arm of Dalkia UK.

=== Demerger of Dalkia’s French and international businesses ===
In July 2014, EDF bought the company's French business and Veolia bought its international operations.

The demerger authorized the two groups to continue using the Dalkia brand for 18 months, before handing over the exclusive rights to Dalkia France / EDF.

In this way, the Dalkia brand was used in France by EDF and abroad by Veolia Environment up until January 2018. Since then, it has been operated by EDF exclusively.

=== Since 2014 ===
Dalkia has now six energy subsidiaries and is expanding in international markets, mainly in the United Kingdom, Poland, the United States and Russia.

Dalkia has been led by chairwoman and CEO Sylvie Jéhanno since 1 January 2017. The company is now based in Saint-André-lez-Lille, France.

== Activities ==
Dalkia has three main activities:

- Heating and cooling networks
- Energy services for buildings
- Energy services for industry

Its clients come from variety of sectors: industry, residential, tertiary sector, healthcare and local authorities.

Its services include:

- leveraging local renewables
- Energy infrastructure management
- Installation management (design, operations and maintenance)
- Energy efficiency services for client facilities (especially through energy performance and facility management centers)

=== Renewable energy ===
The company has invested in the following technologies: cogeneration (generation of both electricity and heat), biomass, solar power (photovoltaic as well as thermal), geothermal and heat source capture from incineration.

In 2017, the company stated its objective of achieving a 50% share of renewable and recovered energies in its energy mix by 2022.

=== Energy transition ===
Heating networks powered by renewables are used in cities (by residents, companies, local authorities, etc.) to reduce their CO_{2} emissions.

Customers use Dalkia services to optimise energy efficiency, reduce energy consumption and lower energy bills. These services include energy performance contracts and monitoring by connected Dalkia Energy Savings Centers (DESCs).

=== International ===
Operating primarily in France since the demerger of its French and international activities, Dalkia is redeveloping its international business through acquisitions. Dalkia is currently active in eight countries, in which it has acquired several companies that together employ around 2,800 people.

In September 2016, the company acquired Groom Energy Solutions LLC, a U.S.-based company.

In 2017, Sylvie Jéhanno announced that Dalkia would make a strategic priority of international development, aiming for 50% growth outside France by 2022.

In October 2017, the company announced its acquisition of Matex Controls, a Polish SME specialized in climate engineering for industrial and tertiary buildings.

In August 2018, Dalkia expanded its energy services in the US with the acquisition of Aegis Energy Services, specializing in CHP systems.

In 2019, the Dalkia brand is deployed outside of France. In Poland, ZEC Katowice is now called Dalkia Polska Energia and Matex Controls has changed its name to Dalkia Polska Solutions. In the United States, Groom Energy Solutions has been rebranded Dalkia Energy Solutions.

== Key figures ==
- More than 330 district heating and cooling networks (2,900 km)

== Organization ==
Dalkia has five energy services subsidiaries:

- Dalkia Biogaz (formerly Verdesis) specialises in the production, treatment and recovery of biogas.
- Dalkia Smart Building (formerly Optimal Solutions)
- Dalkia Froid Solutions (formerly Cesbron) specialises in industrial/commercial cooling and HVAC engineering
- Dalkia Wastenergy (formerly Tiru) specialises in turning waste into energies.
- Dalkia Air Solutions (formerly Techsim) provides equipment to audit, design, install and maintain facilities for compressed air, nitrogen and breathable air in all sectors of industry.
