= Constanța =

Coastal city in Constanța County, Romania

Constanța كوستنجه Köstence (1411-1878) Tomis Τόμις (600 BC - 950 AD)
- County seat and Municipality
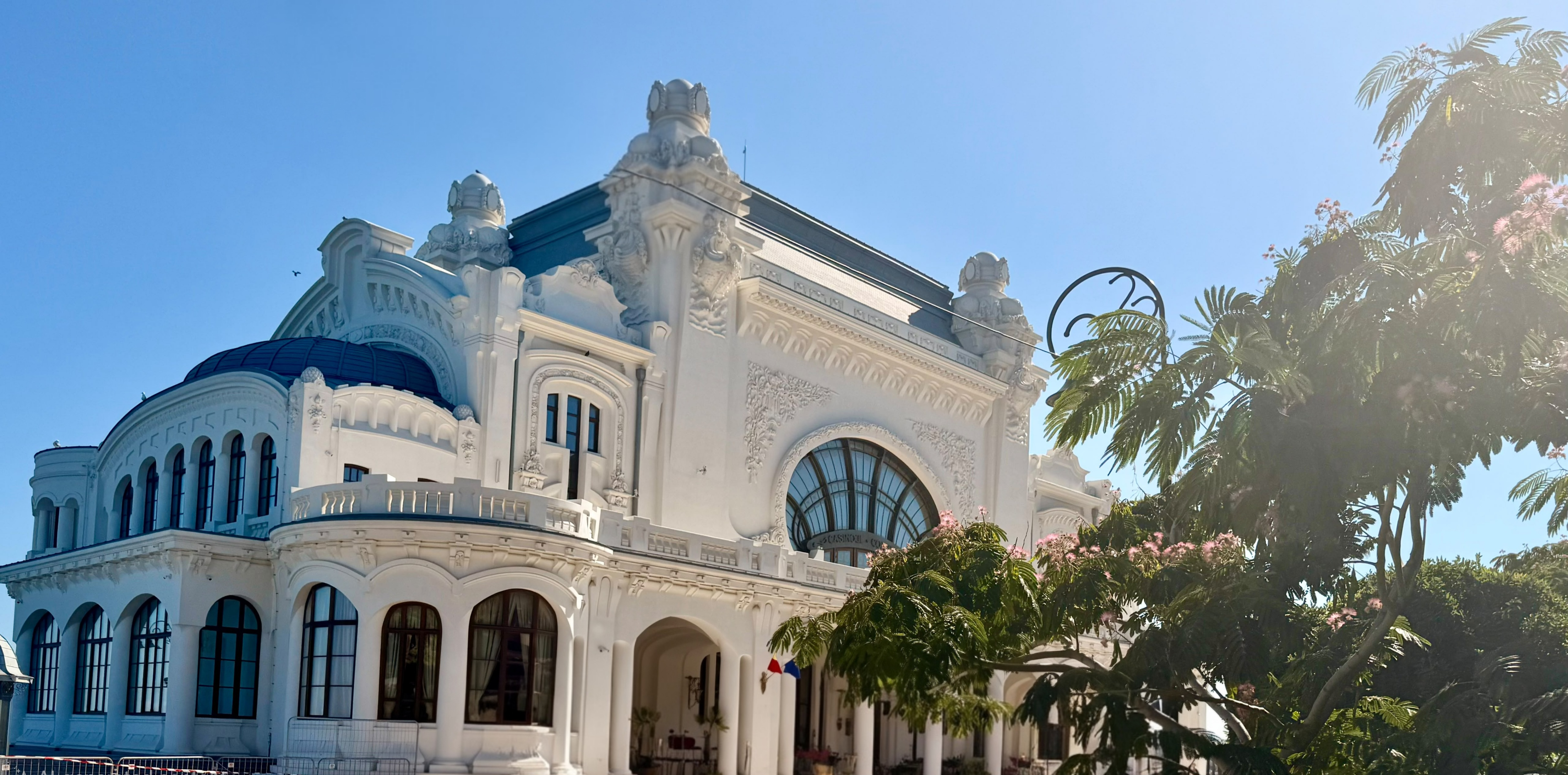
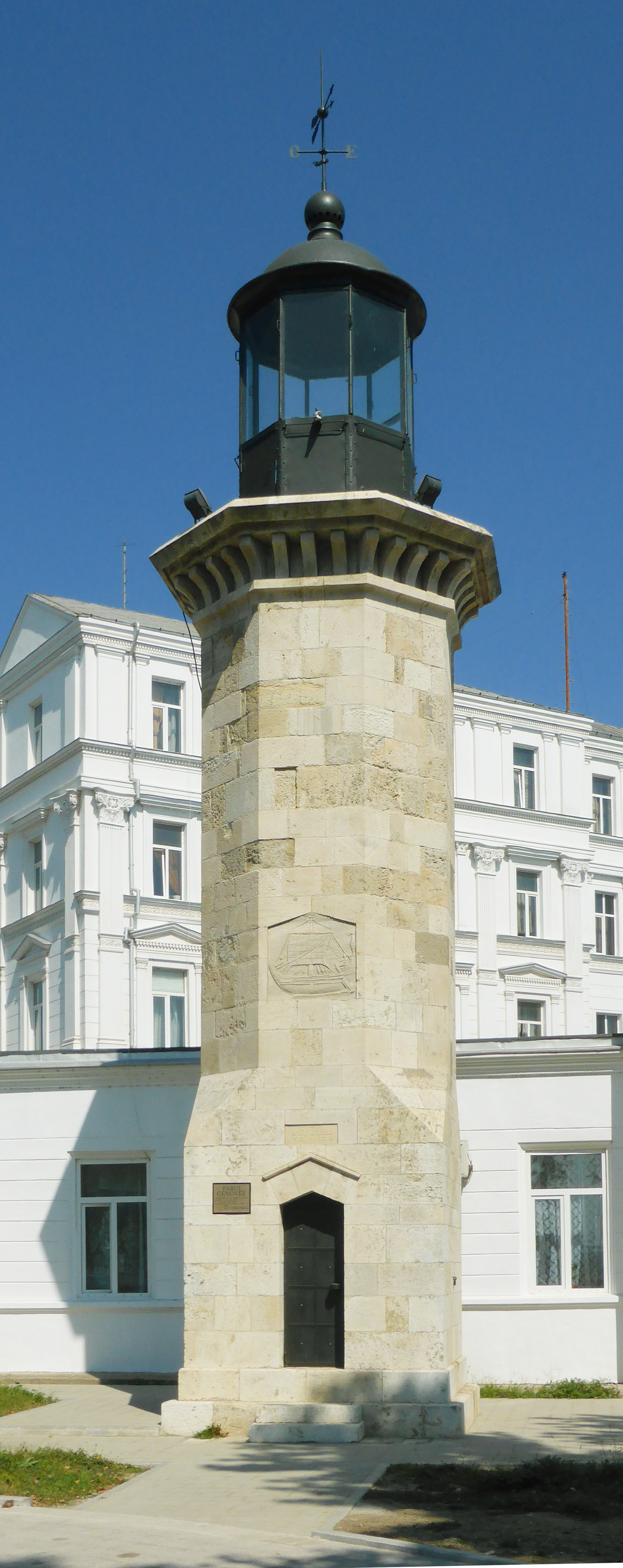
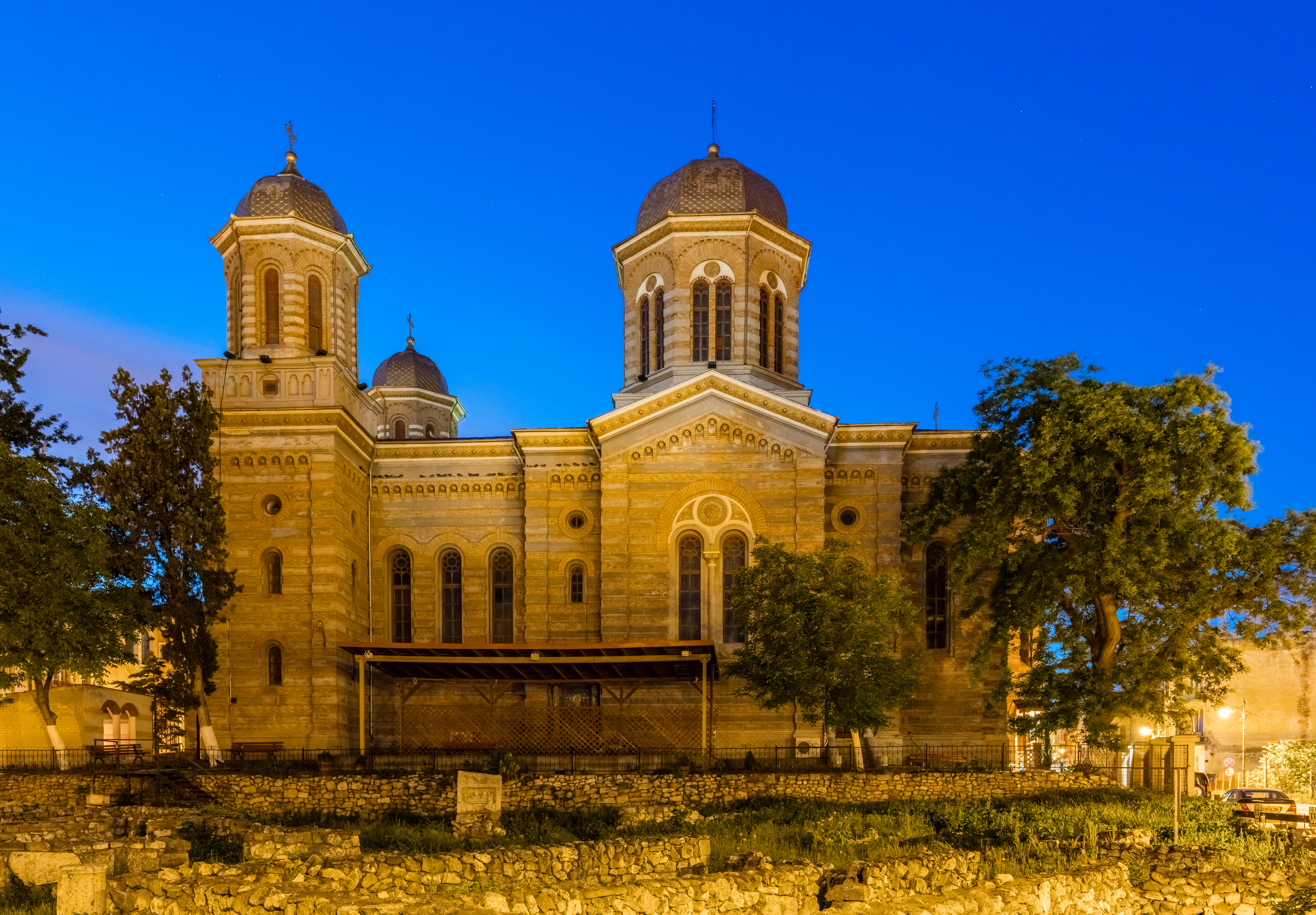
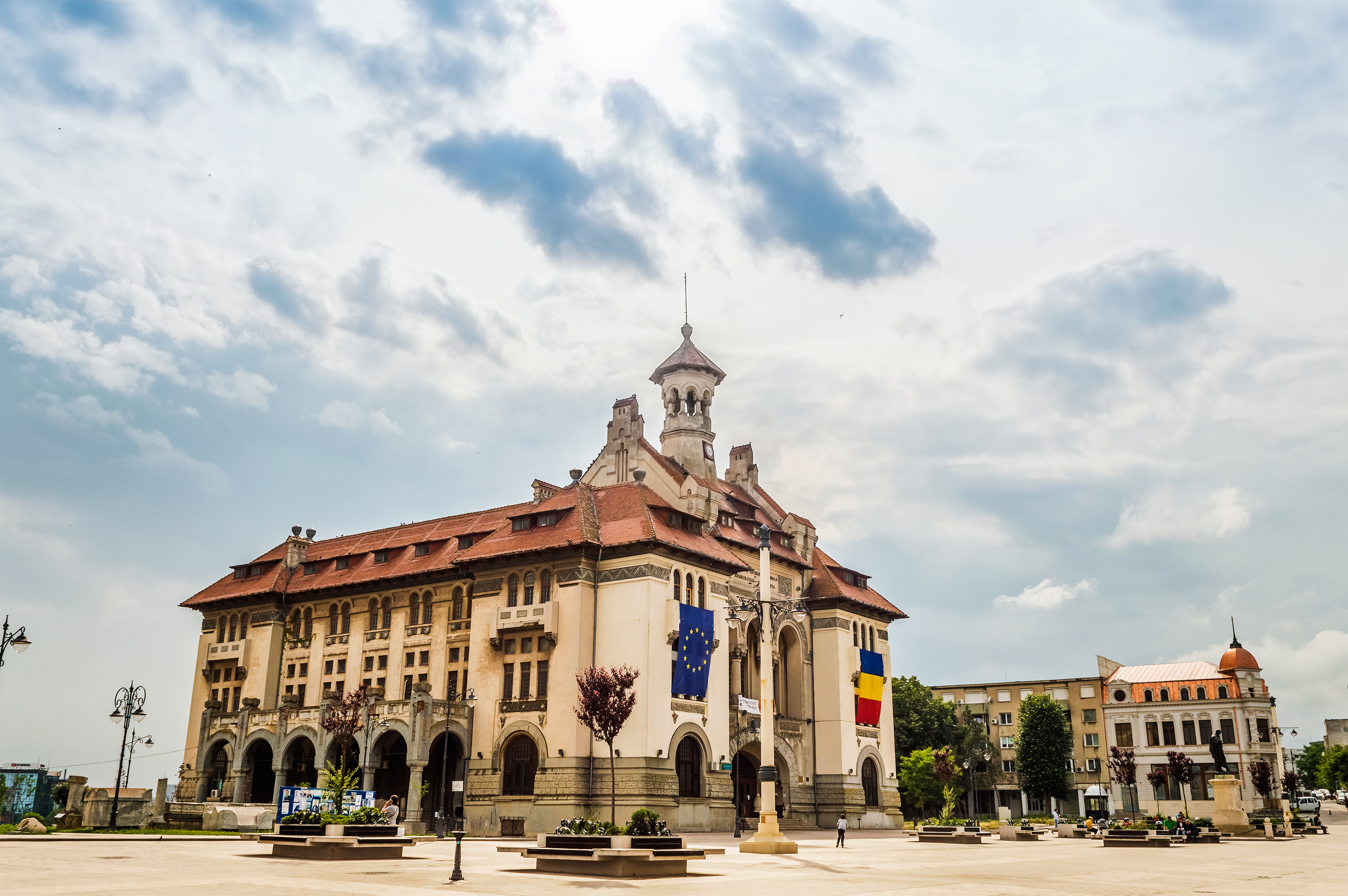
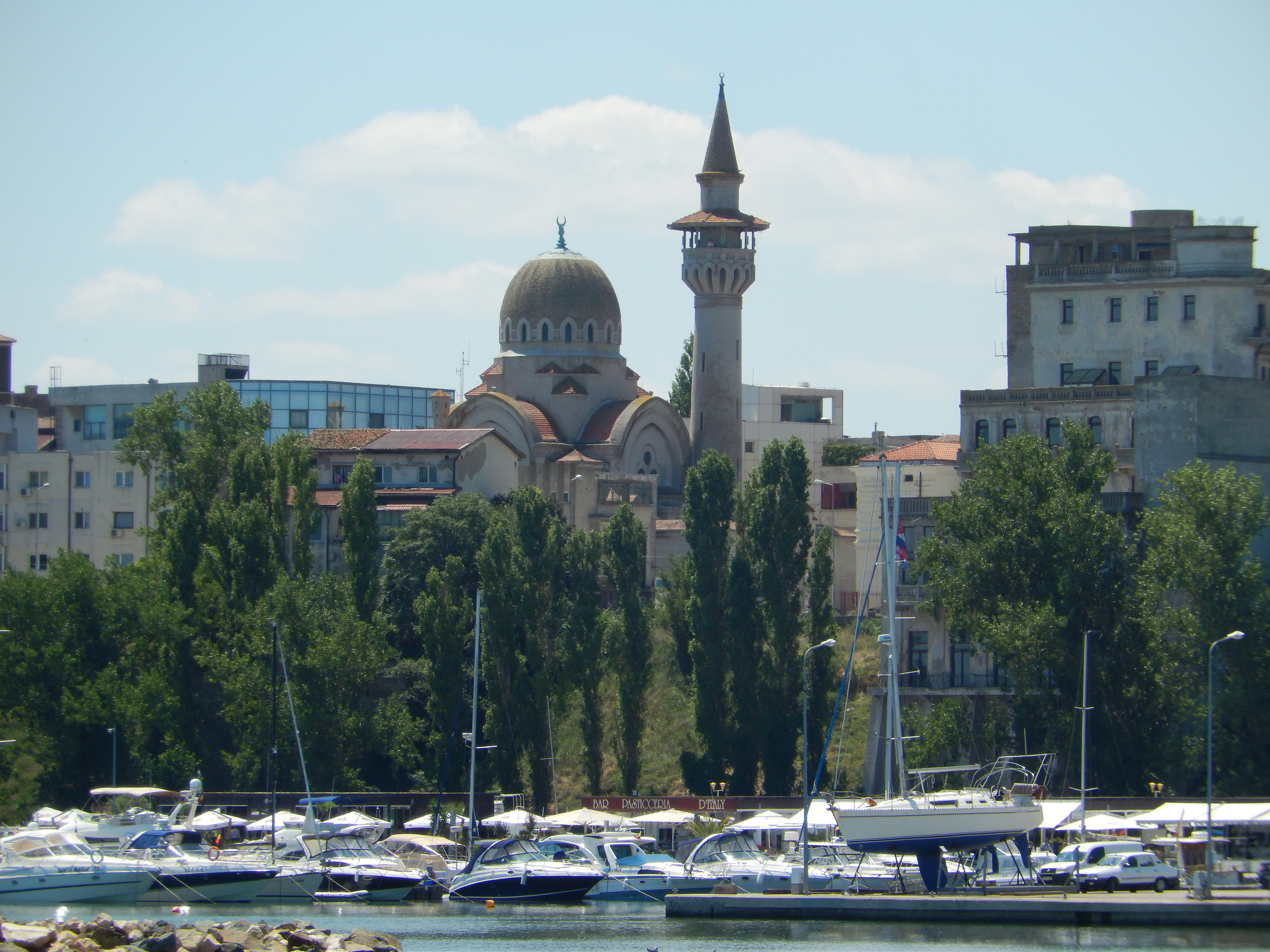
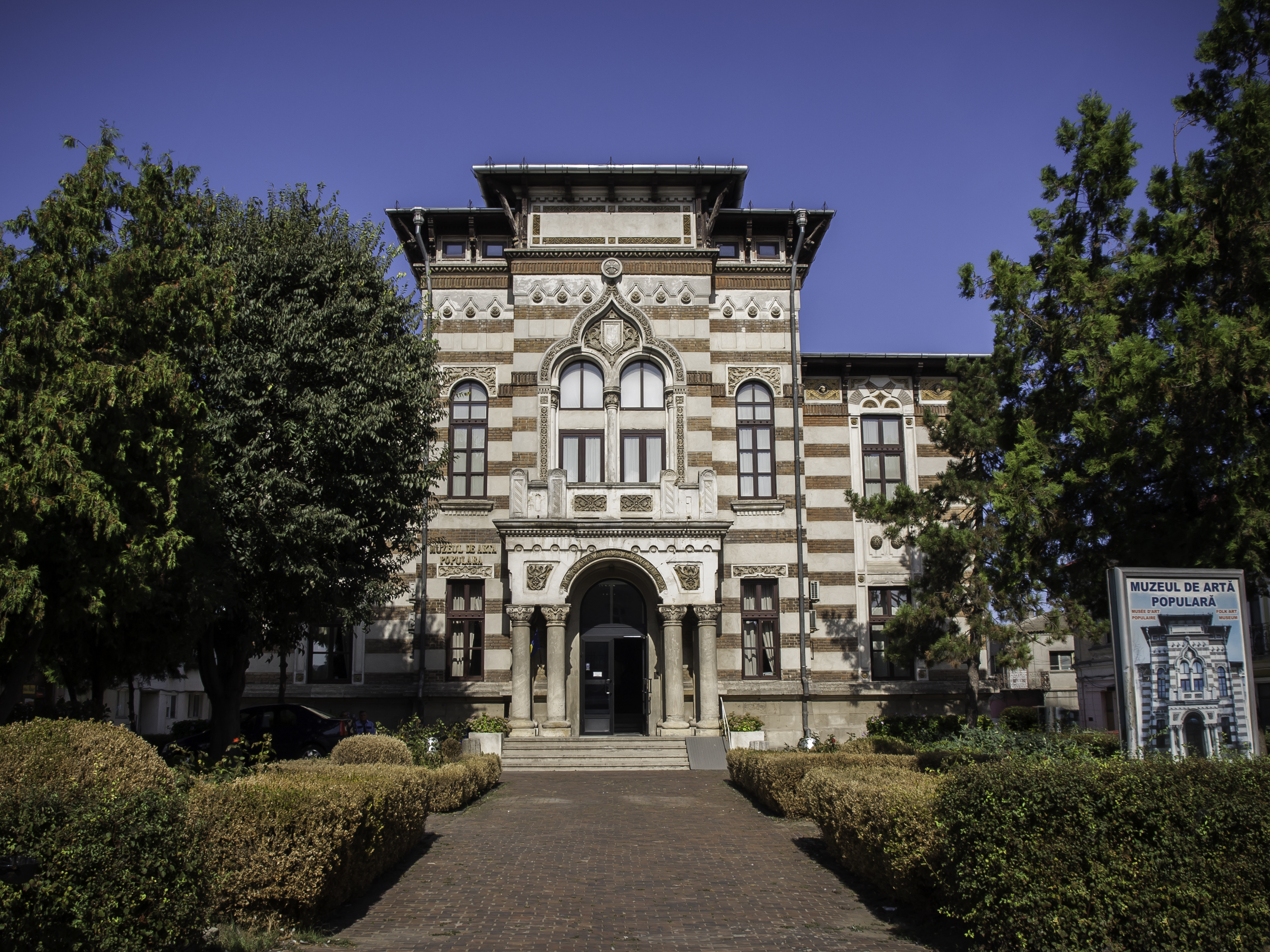
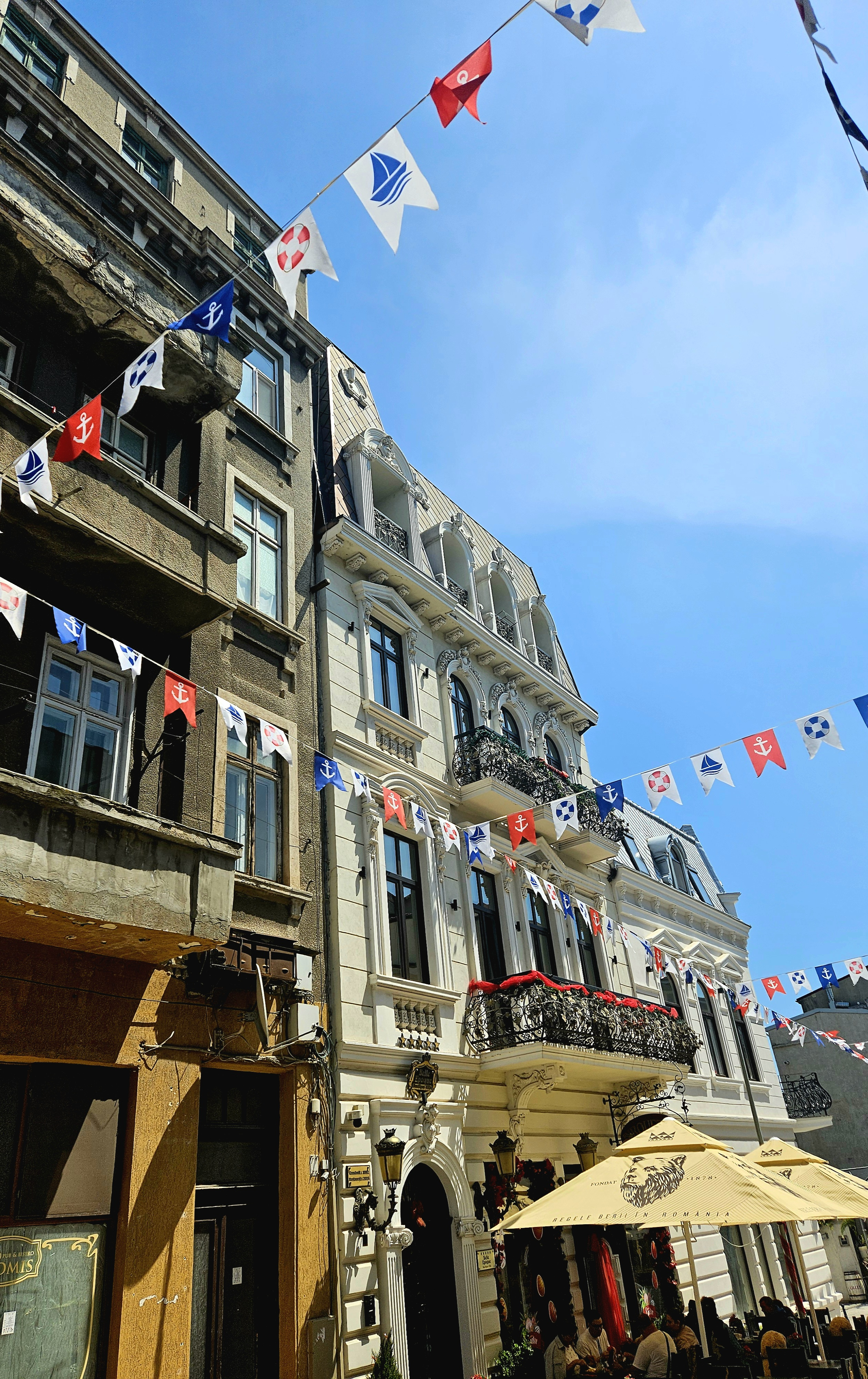
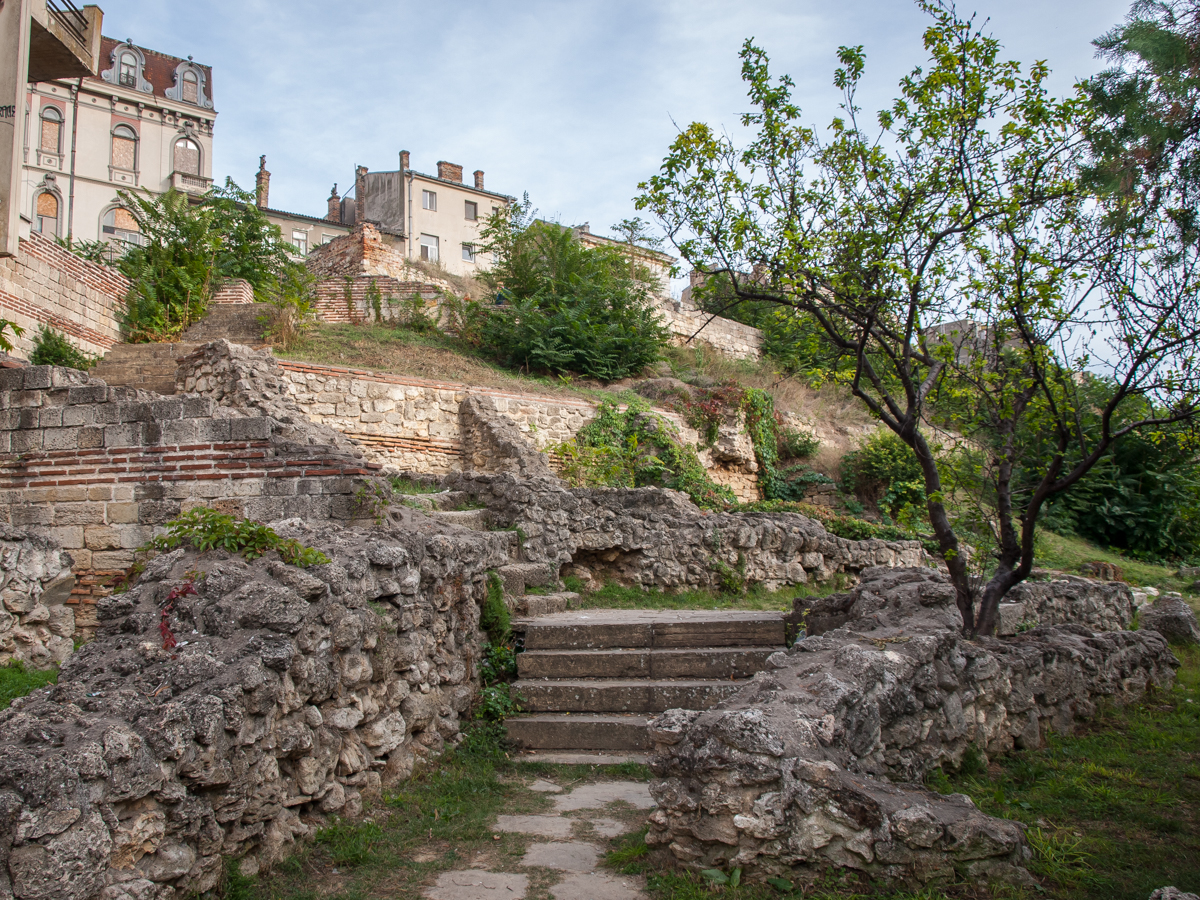
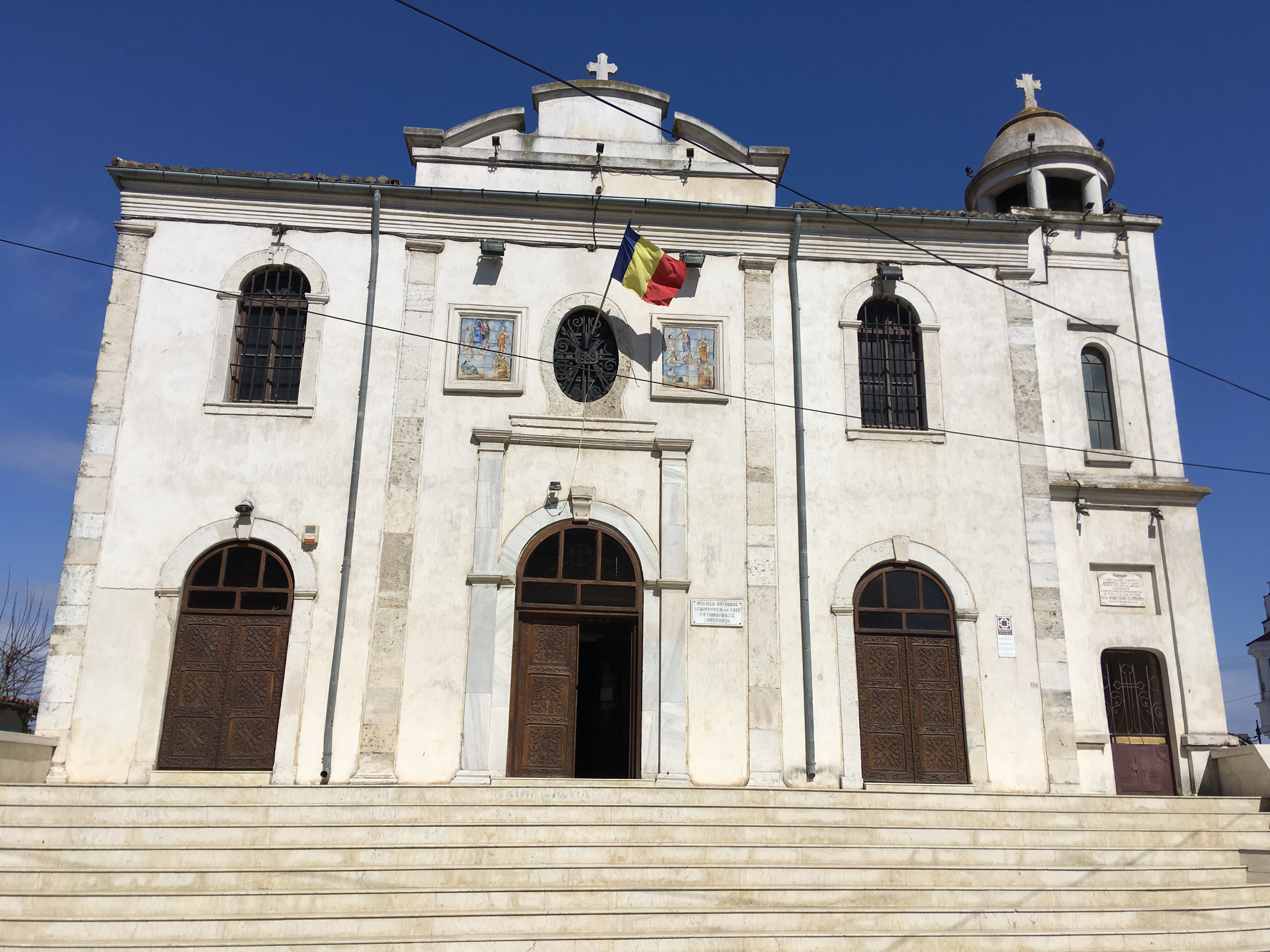
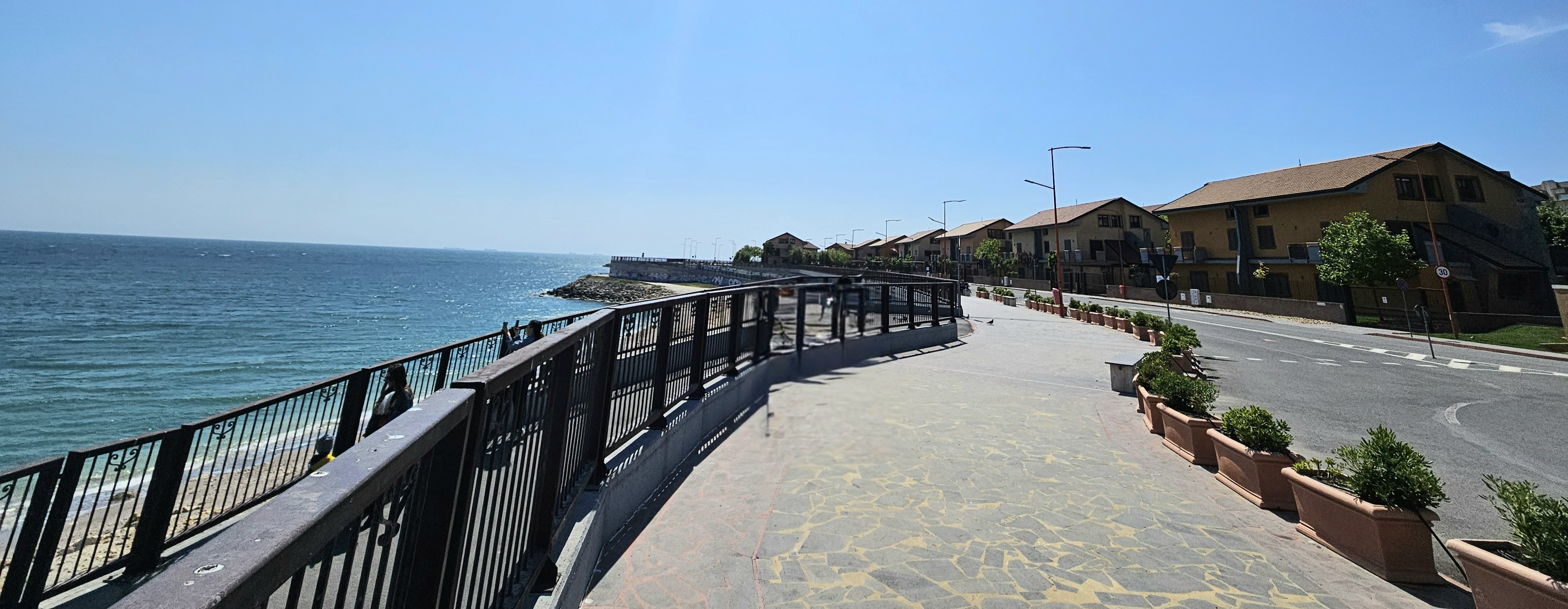
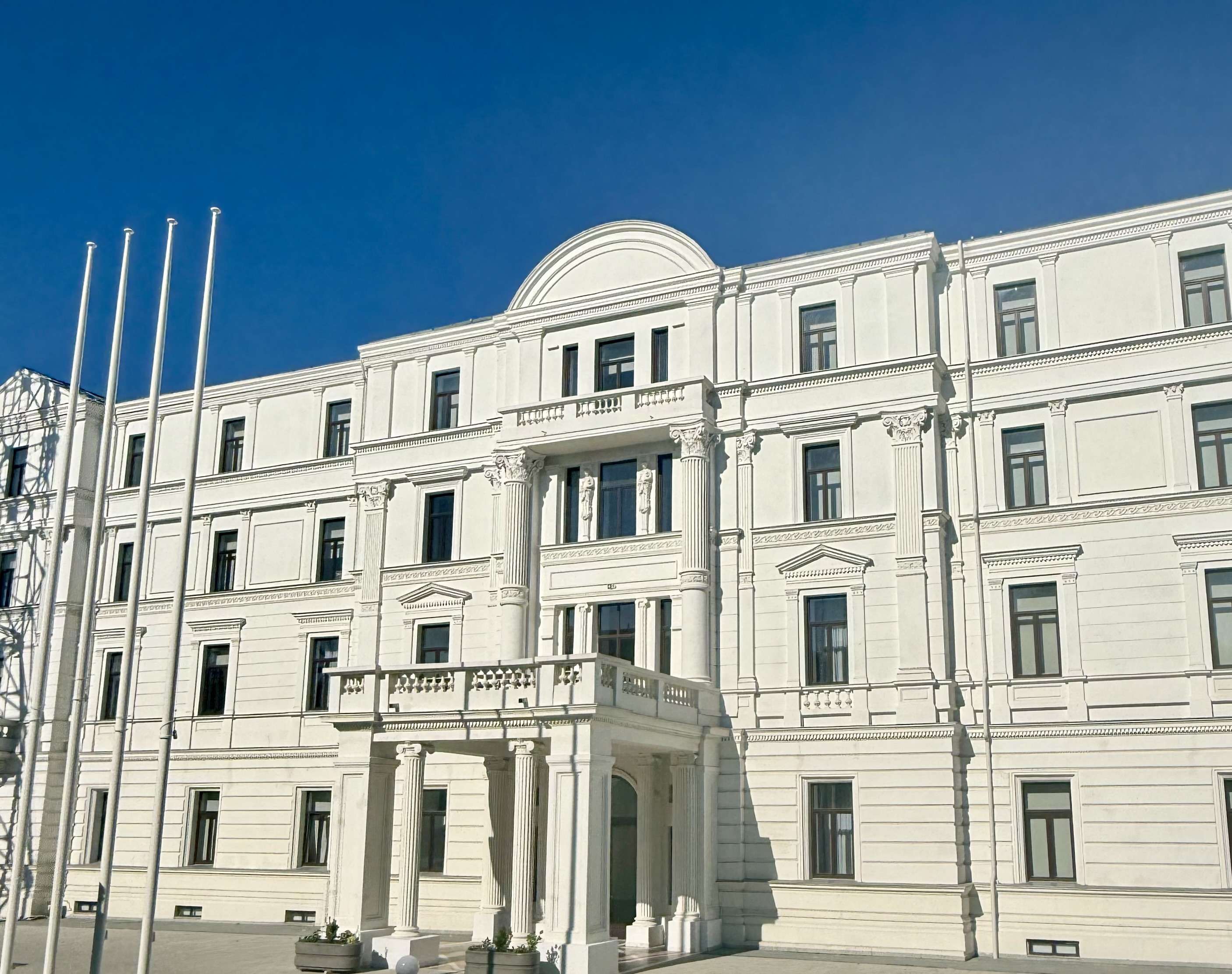
- Constanța Casino Lighthouse Cathedral National History Museum Grand Mosque of Constanța Folk History Museum Old Town Ancient city of Tomis The Greek church Seafront Romanian Navy

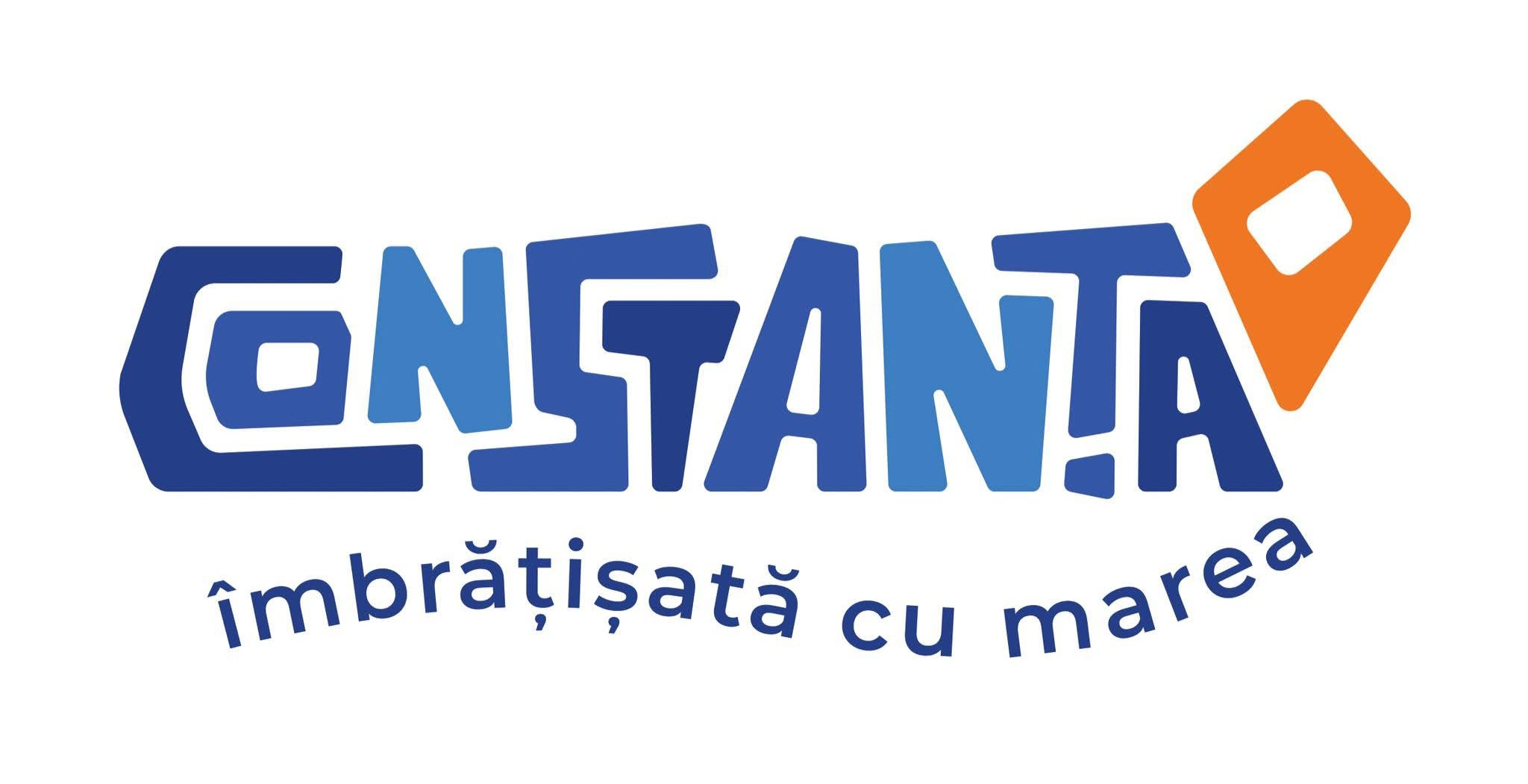
- Flag Coat of arms Brandmark
- Interactive map of Constanța
- Location in Romania
- Coordinates: 44°10′N 28°38′E
- Country: Romania
- County: Constanța
- Founded: ca. 6th century BC as Tomis

Government
  - Mayor (2024–2028): Vergil Chițac (PNL)

Area
  - County seat and Municipality: 124.89 km^{2} (48.22 sq mi)
  - Metro: 1,013.5 km^{2} (391.3 sq mi)
- Elevation: 25 m (82 ft)

Population (2021 census)
  - County seat and Municipality: 263,688
  - Density: 2,112/km^{2} (5,470/sq mi)
  - Metro (2011): 425,916
- Demonym(s): constănțean, constănțeancă (ro)
- Postal code: 900xxx
- Area code: (+40) 41
- Vehicle registration: CT
- Languages: Romanian
- Website: www.primaria-constanta.ro

Constanța (UK: /kɒnˈstæntsə/, US: /kənˈstɑːn(t)sə/, Romanian: [konˈstant͡sa]) (Note: Aromanian: Custantsa; Bulgarian: Кюстенджа, romanized: Kyustendzha, or Констанца, Konstantsa; Dobrujan Tatar: Köstencĭ; Greek: Κωνστάντζα, romanized: Kōnstántza, or Κωνστάντια, Kōnstántia; Turkish: Köstence [cœsˈtændʒe]; historically known as Tomis or Tomi (Ancient Greek: Τόμις or Τόμοι).) Ottoman Turkish كو ستنجه - Köstendje, is a city in the Northern Dobruja historical region of Romania. A port city, it is the capital of Constanța County and the country's fourth largest city and principal port on the Black Sea coast. It is the oldest continuously inhabited city in Romania, founded around 600 BC, and among the oldest in Europe.

As of the 2021 census, Constanța has a population of 263,688. The Constanța metropolitan area includes 14 localities within 30 km (19 mi) of the city. It is one of the largest metropolitan areas in Romania. Ethnic Romanians became a majority in the city in the early 20th century. The city still has small Tatar and Greek communities, which were substantial in previous centuries, as well as Turkish and Romani residents, among others. Constanța has a rich multicultural heritage, as, throughout history, it has been part of different cultures, including Roman, Byzantine, Bulgarian, and Ottoman. Following the Russo-Turkish War (1877–1878), Constanța became part of Romania, and the city, which at the time had a population of just over 5,000 inhabitants, grew significantly throughout the 20th century.

The Port of Constanța has an area of 39.26 km^{2} (15.16 sq mi) and a length of about 30 km (19 mi). It is the largest port on the Black Sea, and one of the largest ports in Europe.

== History ==
Historical affiliations

Roman Republic 29 BC–27 BC
Roman Empire 27 BC–395
Byzantine Empire 395–680
First Bulgarian Empire 680–971
Byzantine Empire 971–1186
Second Bulgarian Empire 1186–1356
Despotate of Dobruja 1356–1411
Ottoman Empire 1411–1878
Romania 1878–1918 (de facto until Oct. 1916)
(German Empire) (Austria-Hungary) (Tsardom of Bulgaria (1908–1946)) Central Powers May 1918–Sept. 1918 (de facto from Oct. 1916)
Bulgaria Sept. 1918–Nov. 1919 (de facto until Dec. 1918)
Romania 1919–present (de facto since Dec. 1918)

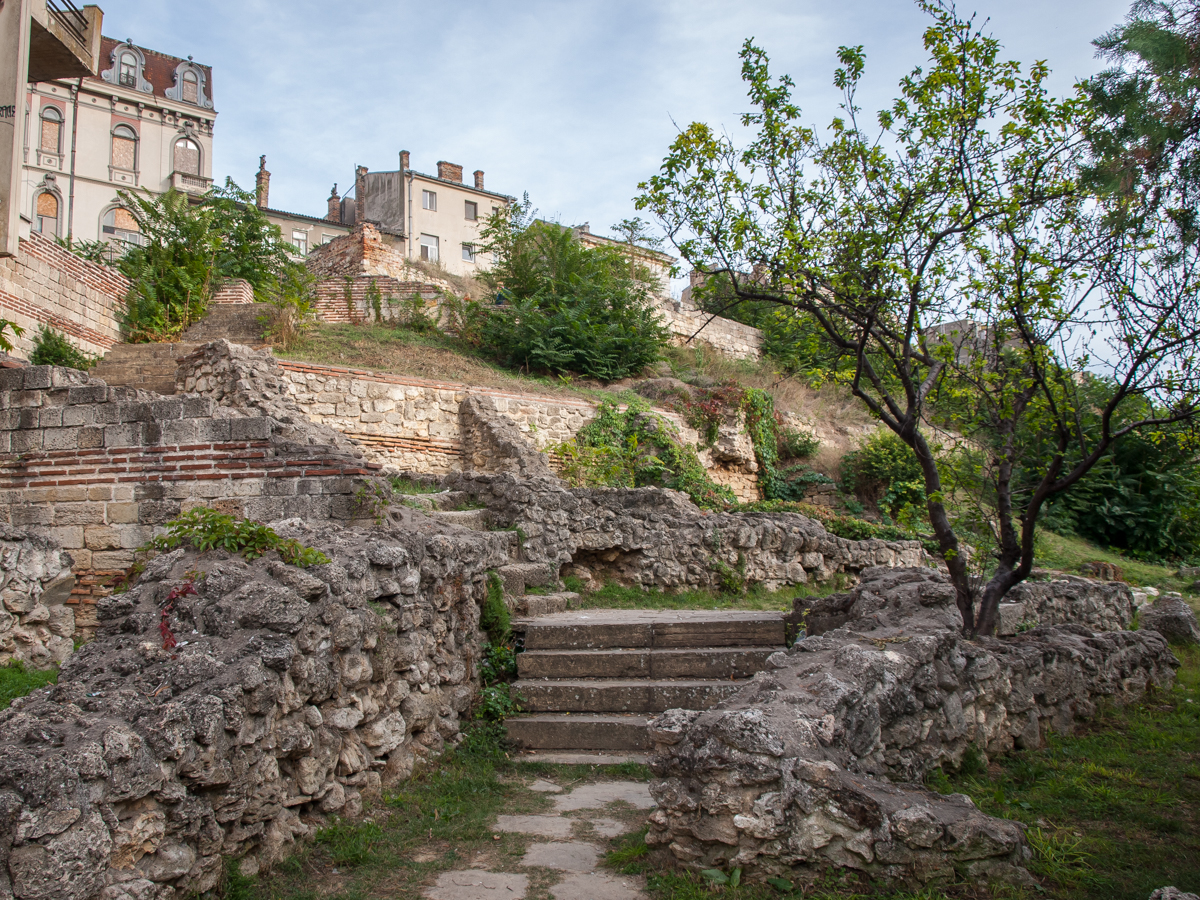
Tomis

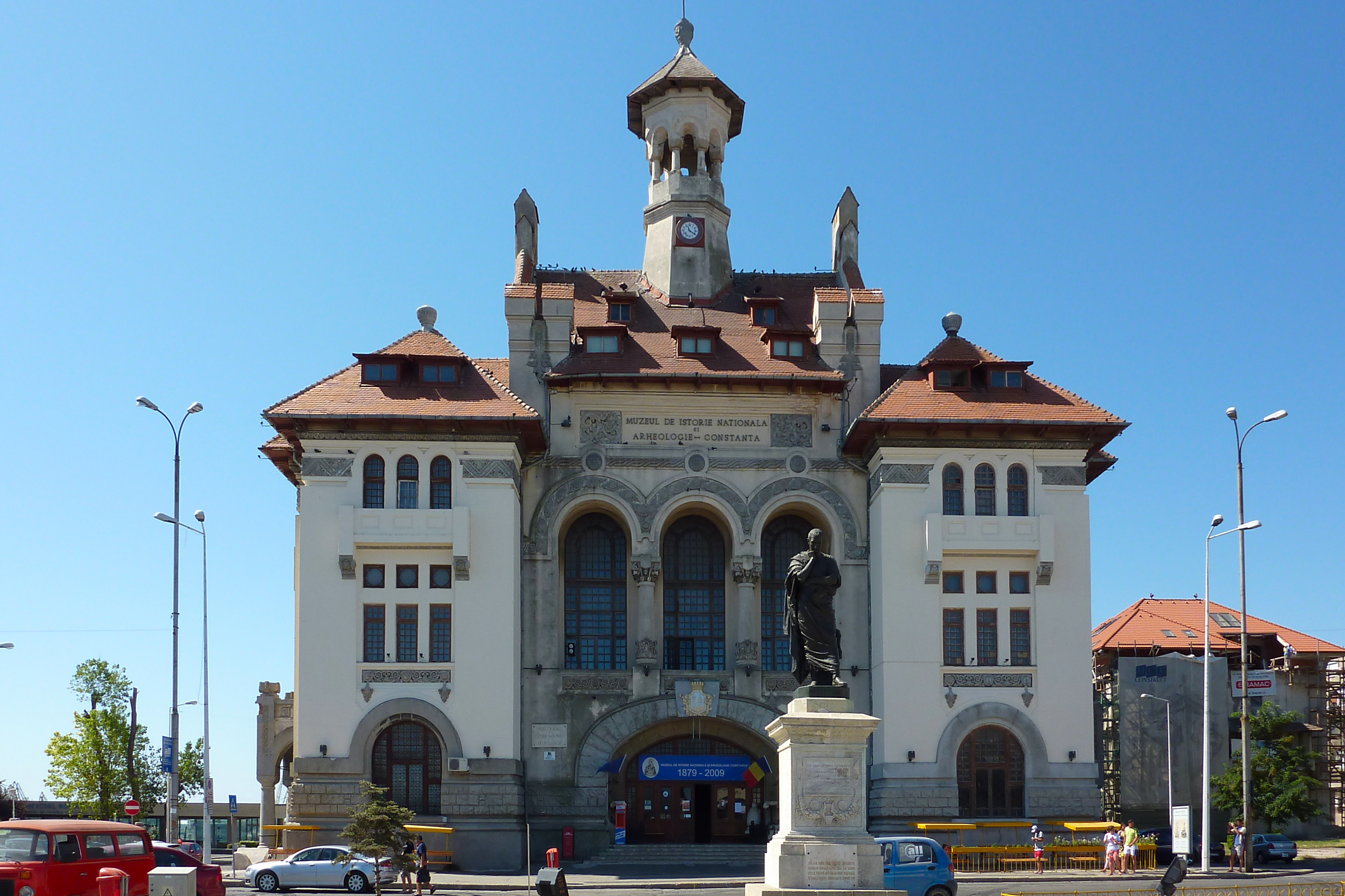
Statue of Ovid in front of the Museum of National History

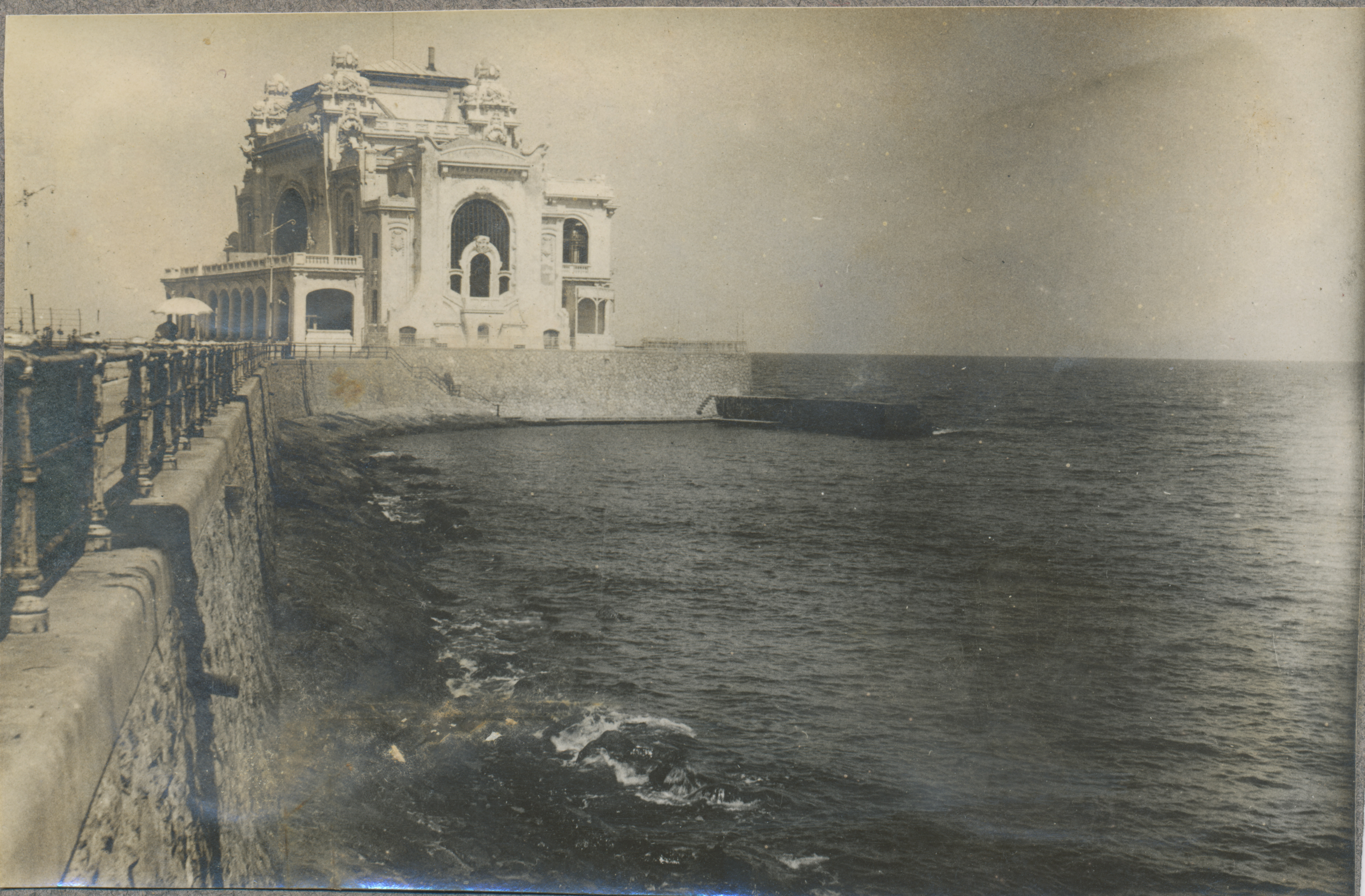
Casino after the occupation of the port of Constanța by Soviet sailors in 1944.

=== Ancient history ===
Tomis was founded in the 6th century BC as a Greek colony as were nearby the colonies of Histria, Orgame, and Kallatis in the same era.

The site had the advantage of a fine harbour, the Carasu valley offering an inland shortcut from the sea to the Danube, and fertile land nearby. The peninsula on which it was sited has high cliffs protecting Tomis from cold winds and from attack.

Most of the ancient city is covered by the modern-day Constanța, making archaeology difficult.

In the 5th century BC it was under the influence of the Delian League, passing in this period from oligarchy to democracy.

The war for the emporion of Tomis took place in the middle of the 3rd century BC.

In 29 BC the Romans captured the region from the Odrysian kingdom and annexed it as far as the Danube.

It was a member, perhaps the capital, of the Hexapolis alliance of Greek cities with Histria, Callatis, Dionysupolis, Odessos and Mesambria.

In AD 8, the Roman poet Ovid (43 BC–17 AD) was banished to Tomis by Emperor Augustus for the last eight years of his life. He lamented his Tomisian exile in his poems Tristia and Epistulae ex Ponto. Tomis was "by his account a town located in a war-stricken cultural wasteland on the remotest margins of the empire".

A number of inscriptions found in and around the city show that Constanța stands over the site of Tomis. Some of these finds are now preserved in the British Museum in London.

The city was afterwards included in the Province of Moesia and, from the time of Diocletian, in Scythia Minor of which it was the capital.

In 269 the city was attacked by the Goths who succeeded in destroying only suburbs outside the walls.

The city lay at the seaward end of the Great Wall of Trajan. Tomis was later called Constantiana, possibly in honour of Constantia, the half-sister of Roman Emperor Constantine the Great or his son Constantius II, a name mentioned for the town by Procopius of Caesarea. In 395, Tomis was assigned to the Eastern Roman Empire.

=== Middle Ages ===
During Maurice's Balkan campaigns, Tomis was besieged by the Avars in the winter of 597/598. It was conquered at the Battle of Ongal by the First Bulgarian Empire in 680. It stayed under Bulgarian rule until the Byzantines under John I Tzimiskes retook it in the Rus-Byzantine War of 970-971. Tomis was then seized by the Second Bulgarian Empire during the Uprising of Asen and Peter in 1186.

By the 14th century Italian nautical maps used the name Constanza.

After almost 200 years as part of Bulgaria, and becoming subsequently an independent principality of Dobrotitsa/Dobrotici and of Wallachia under Mircea I of Wallachia, Constanța fell under Ottoman rule around 1411.

=== Recent history ===
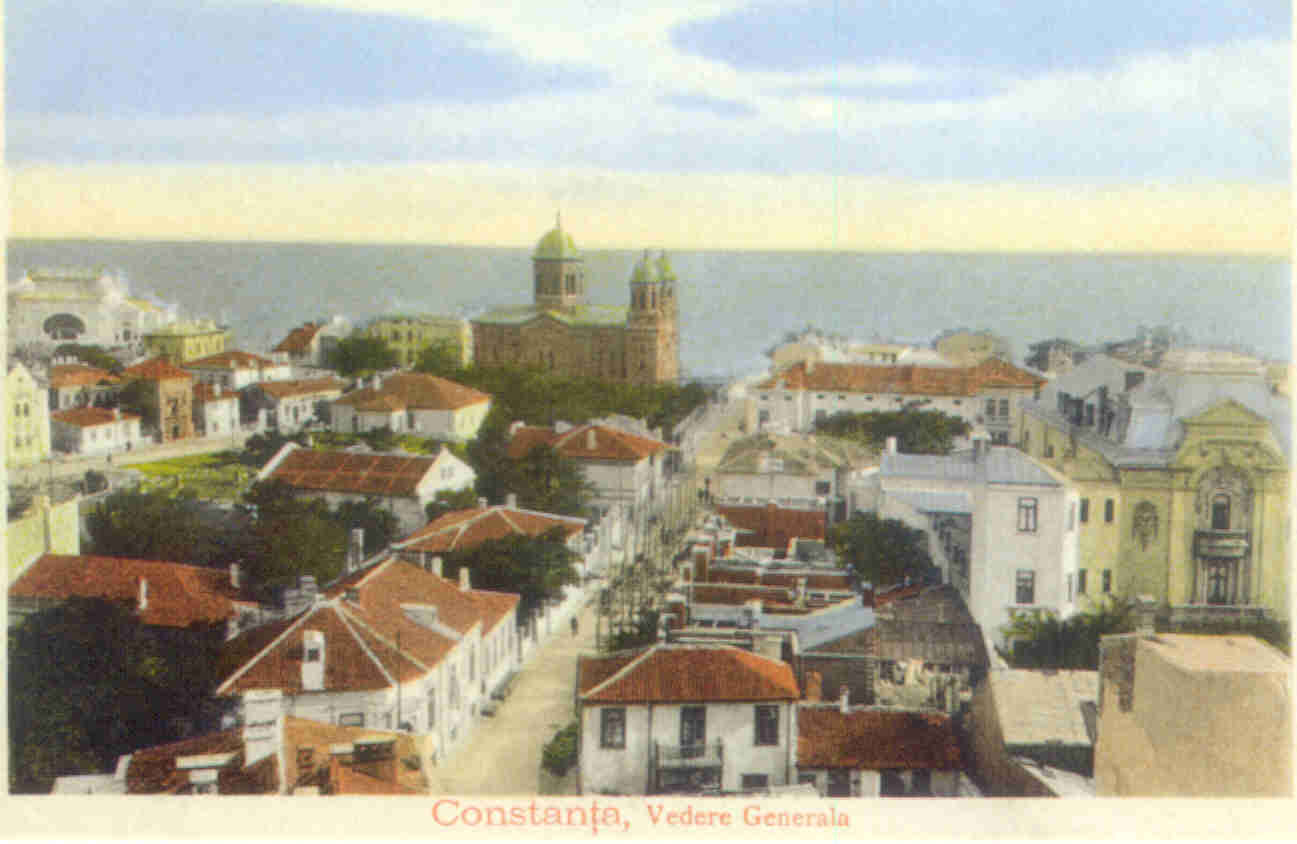
Constanța panorama in 1910

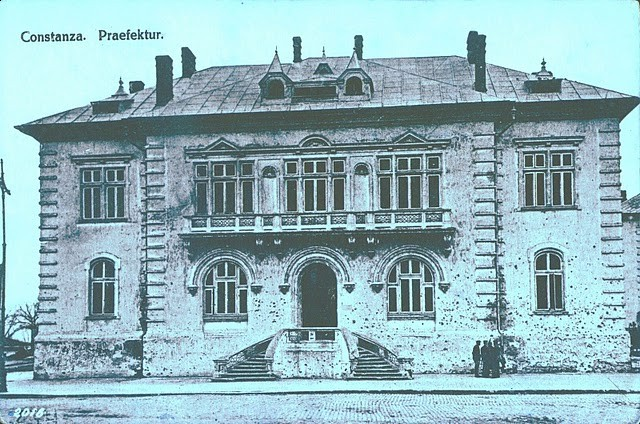
Constanța Prefecture (nowadays the Constanța Military Circle) damaged during city's occupation by the Central Powers (1916–1918)

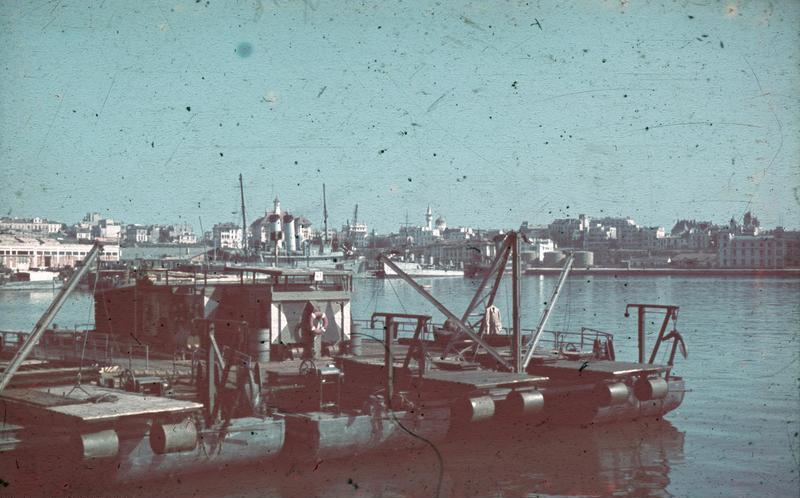
The port of Constanța in 1941

A railroad linking Constanța to Cernavodă was laid in 1860. In spite of damage done by railway contractors, considerable remains of ancient walls, pillars, etc. came to light. What is thought to have been a port building was excavated, and revealed the substantial remains of one of the longest mosaic pavements in the world.

In 1878, after the Romanian War of Independence, Constanța and the rest of Northern Dobruja were ceded by the Ottoman Empire to Romania. The city became Romania's main seaport and the transit point for much of Romania's exports. The Constanța Casino, a historic monument and a symbol of the modern city, was the first building constructed on the shore of the Black Sea after Dobruja came under Romanian administration, with the cornerstone being laid in 1880.

On 22 October 1916 (during World War I), the Central Powers (German, Turkish and Bulgarian troops) occupied Constanța. According to the Treaty of Bucharest of May 1918, article X.b. (a treaty never ratified by Romania), Constanța remained under the joint control of the Central Powers. The city came afterwards under Bulgarian rule after a protocol regarding the transfer of the jointly administered zone in Northern Dobruja to Bulgaria had been signed in Berlin on 24 September 1918, by Germany, Austria-Hungary, the Ottoman Empire and Bulgaria. The agreement was short-lived: five days later, on 29 September, Bulgaria capitulated after the successful offensive on the Macedonian front (see the Armistice of Salonica), and the Allied troops liberated the city in 1918.

In the interwar years, the city became Romania's main commercial hub, so that by the 1930s over half of its exports were exiting via the port. During World War II, when Romania joined the Axis powers, Constanța was a major target for the Allied bombers. While the town was left relatively unscathed, the port suffered extensive damage, recovering only in the early 1950s. The Romanians and Germans constructed many naval batteries to protect to port from naval forces, but they only saw action once. The remains of many Romanian Fortifications of Constanța litter the beaches nearby, as well as near the Casino.

Following the 2022 Russian invasion of Ukraine, the blockading of the Ukrainian Black Sea ports led to renewed interest in the port of Constanta as one possible outlet for transporting grain to the rest of the world. In 2026, a stray Ukrainian naval drone exploded in the port, prompting the evacuation of more than 1,300 people. The Romanian government blamed the incident on electronic interference by Russia.

== Geography ==
Constanța is the administrative center of the county with the same name and the largest city in the Southeastern development region of Romania. The city is located on the Black Sea coast, with a beach length of 13 kilometres (8 miles).

== Main sights ==
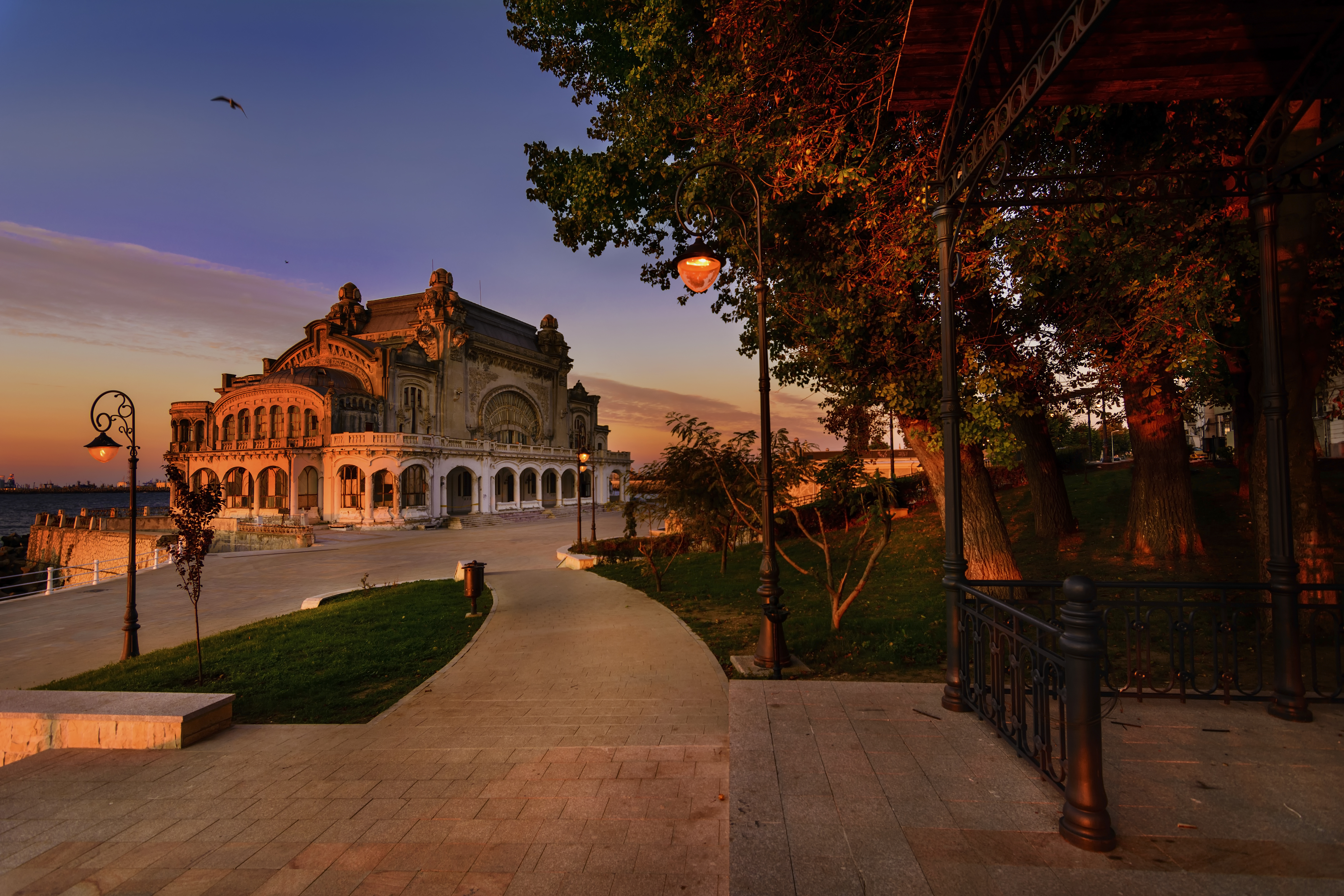
The Casino at sunrise

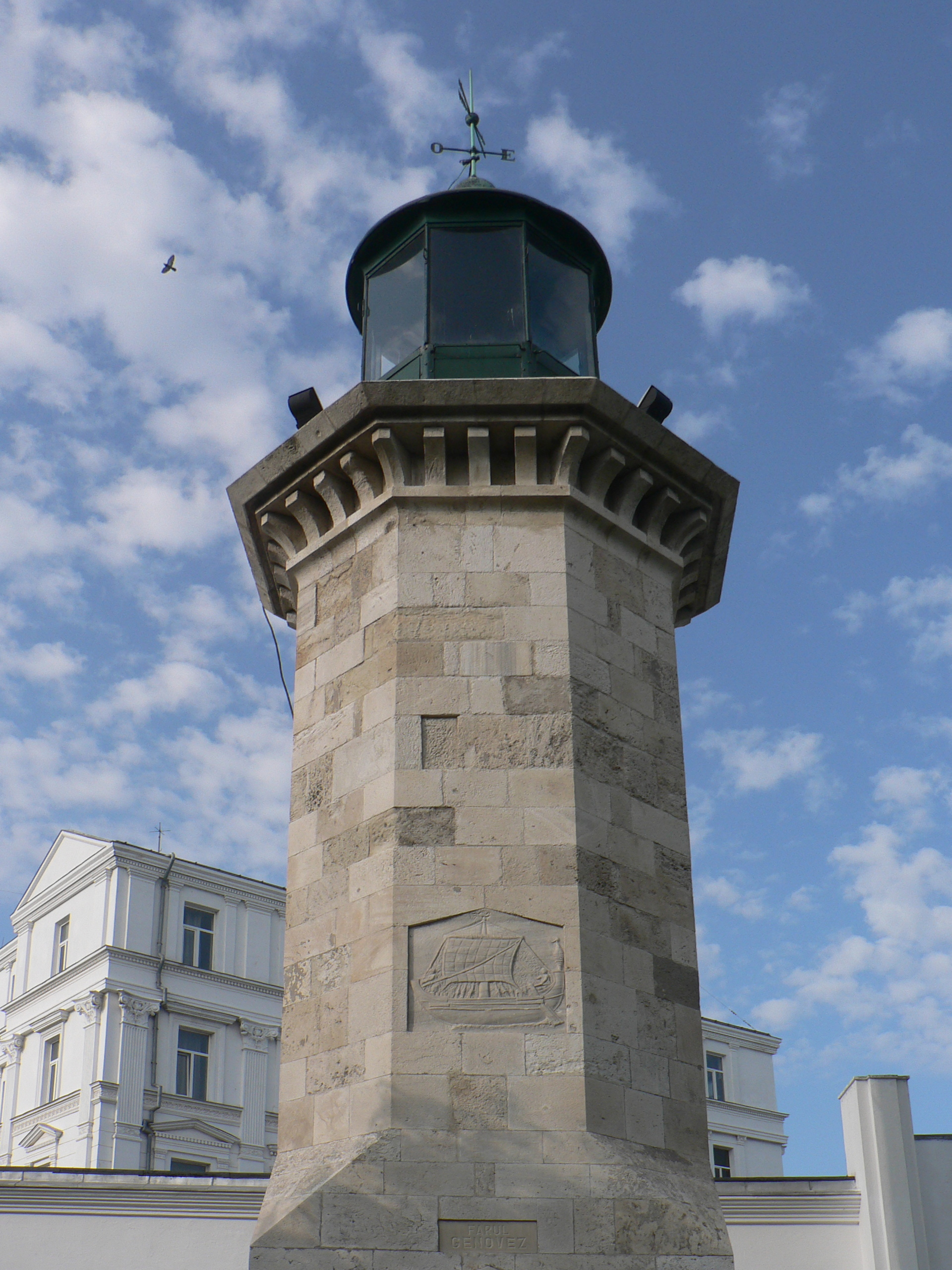
The Genoese Lighthouse

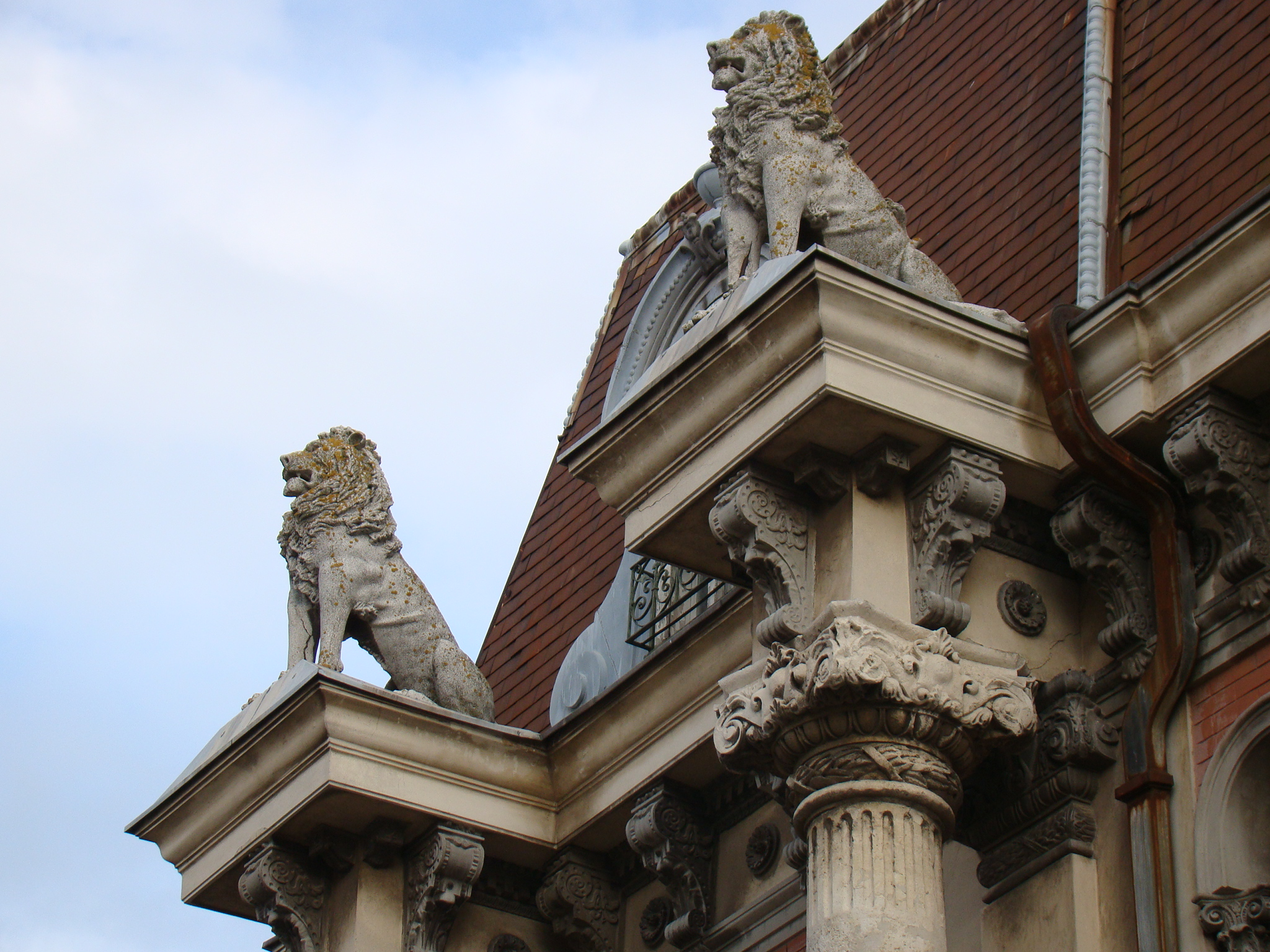
Details from the House with Lions

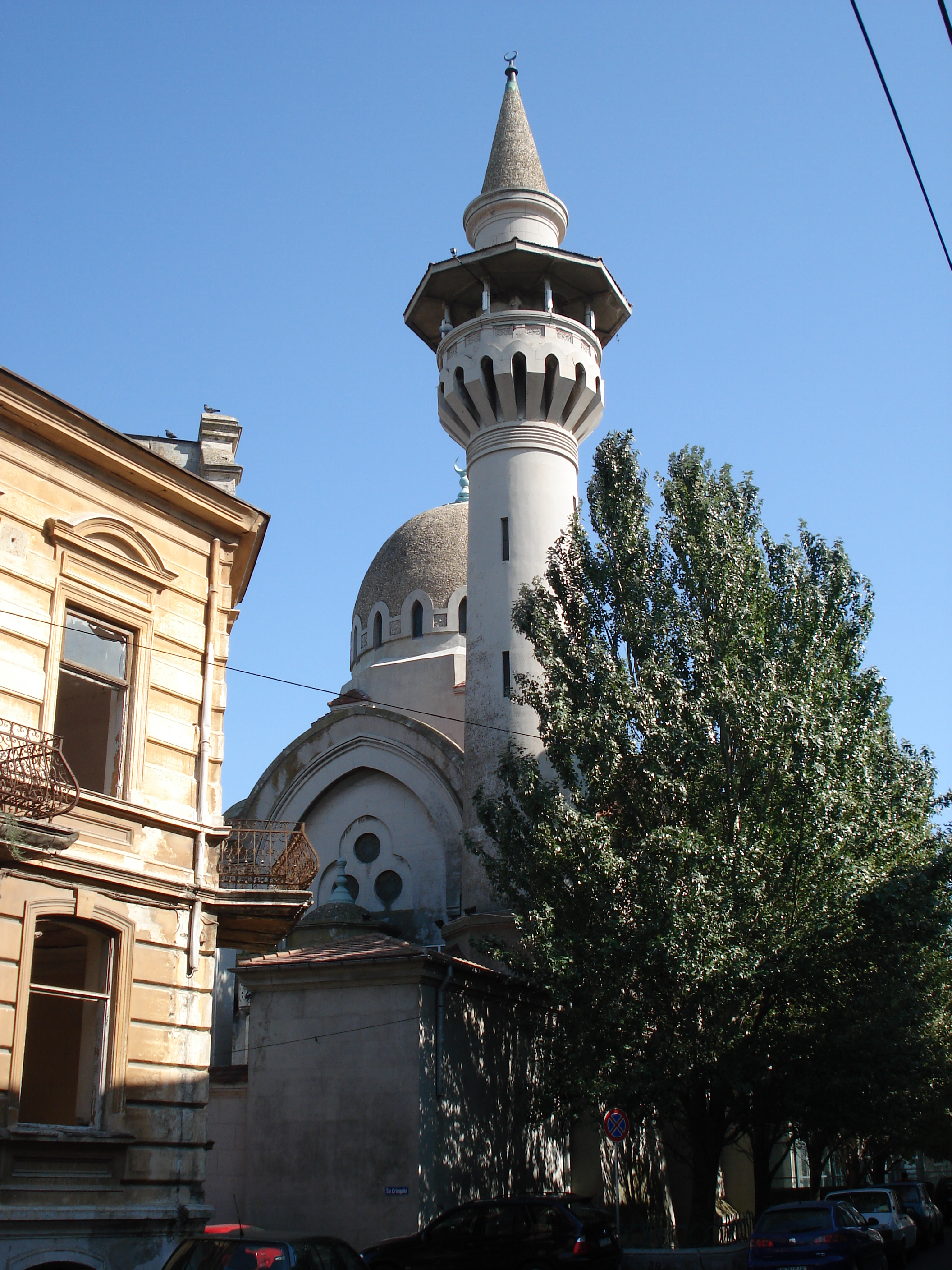
The Grand Mosque of Constanța.

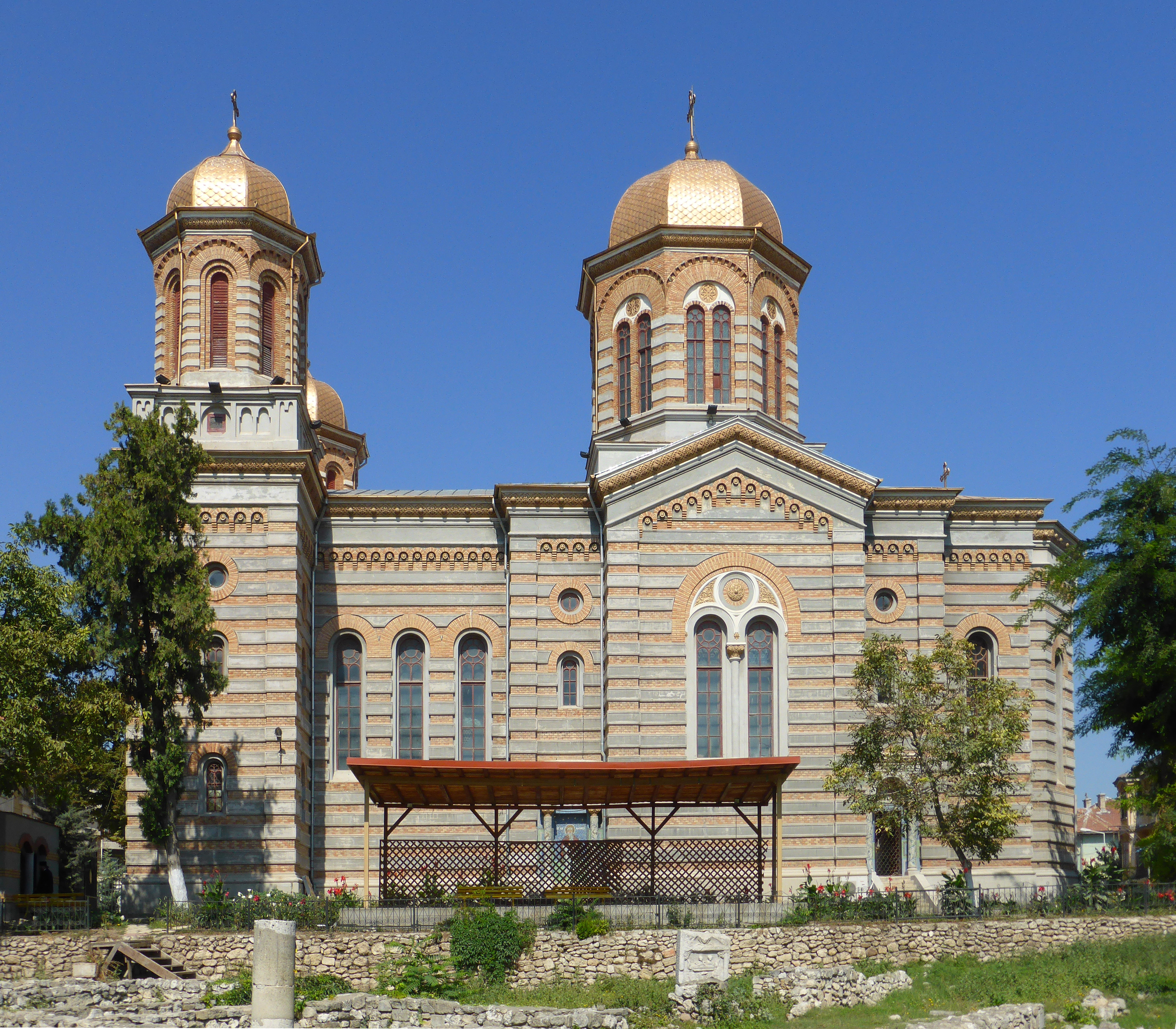
The Cathedral of Saints Peter and Paul

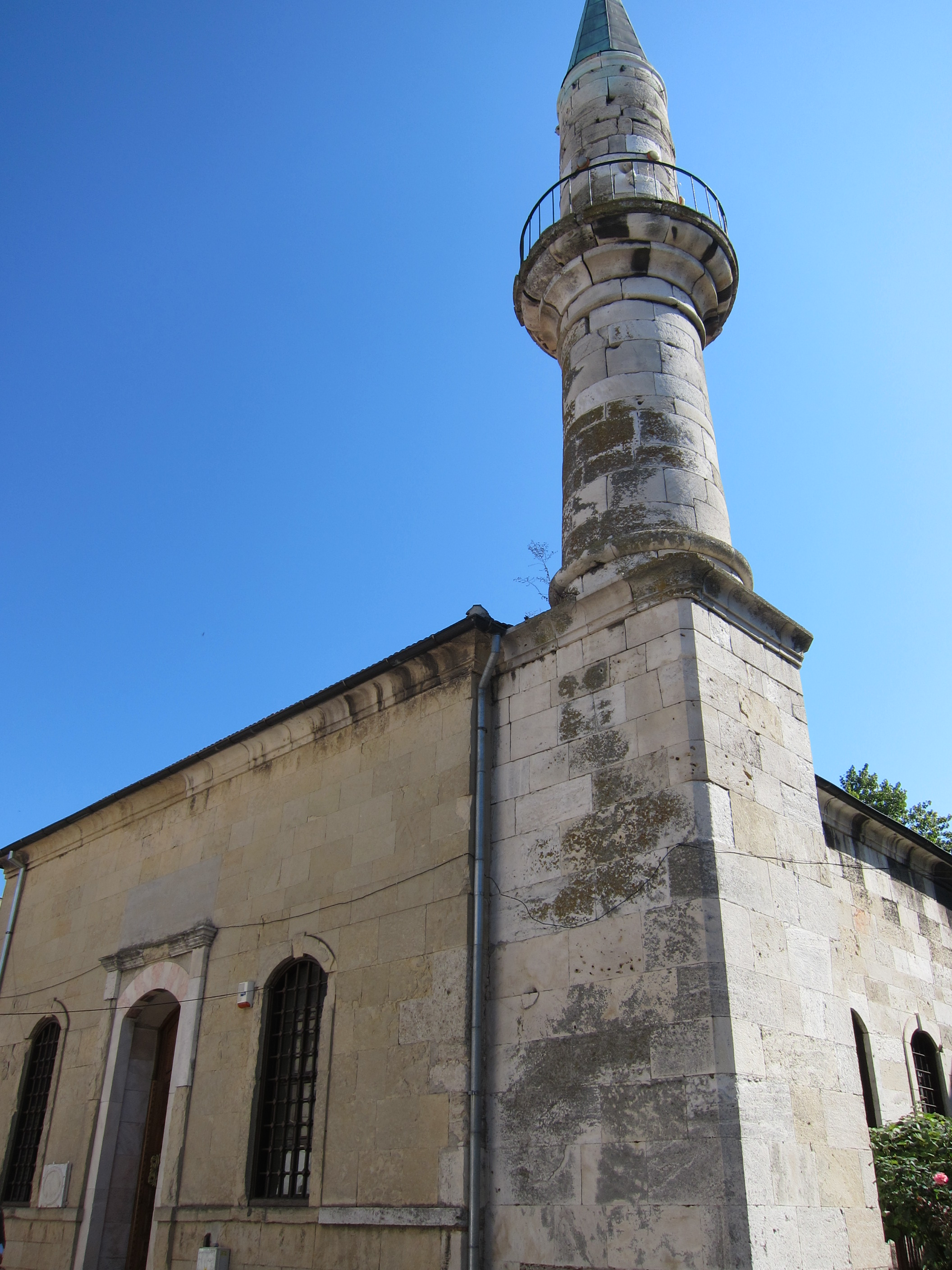
The Ottoman Hunkar mosque

=== Ovid's Square ===
The Emperor Augustus exiled the Roman poet Ovid to what was then Tomis in 8 AD. In 1887, the sculptor Ettore Ferrari designed a statue of Ovid which gave its name to this square in the old town. In 1916, during the occupation of Dobruja by the Central Powers, it was taken down by Bulgarian troops, and was later reinstated by the Germans.

The statue stands in Ovid Square, where the National History and Archaeology Museum is housed in the former City Hall.

=== Genoese Lighthouse (Farul Genovez) ===
The Genoese Lighthouse is 26 feet (7.9 m) high.

=== Casino (Cazinoul) ===
Commissioned by King Carol I in 1910 and designed by architects Daniel Renard and Petre Antonescu right on the seashore, the derelict Constanța Casino features sumptuous Art Nouveau architecture. Once a huge attraction for European tourists, the casino lost its customers after the collapse of Communism. In 2021 renovation of the building finally began.

The Constanța Aquarium is nearby.

=== Cathedral ===
The Cathedral of Saints Peter and Paul was built between 1883 and 1885.

=== Grand Mosque of Constanța (Marea Moschee din Constanța) ===
Built in 1910 by King Carol I, the Grand Mosque of Constanța was originally called the Carol I Mosque.

=== Hünkar Mosque (Geamia Hunchiar) ===
The Hünkar Mosque was completed in 1869.

== Climate ==
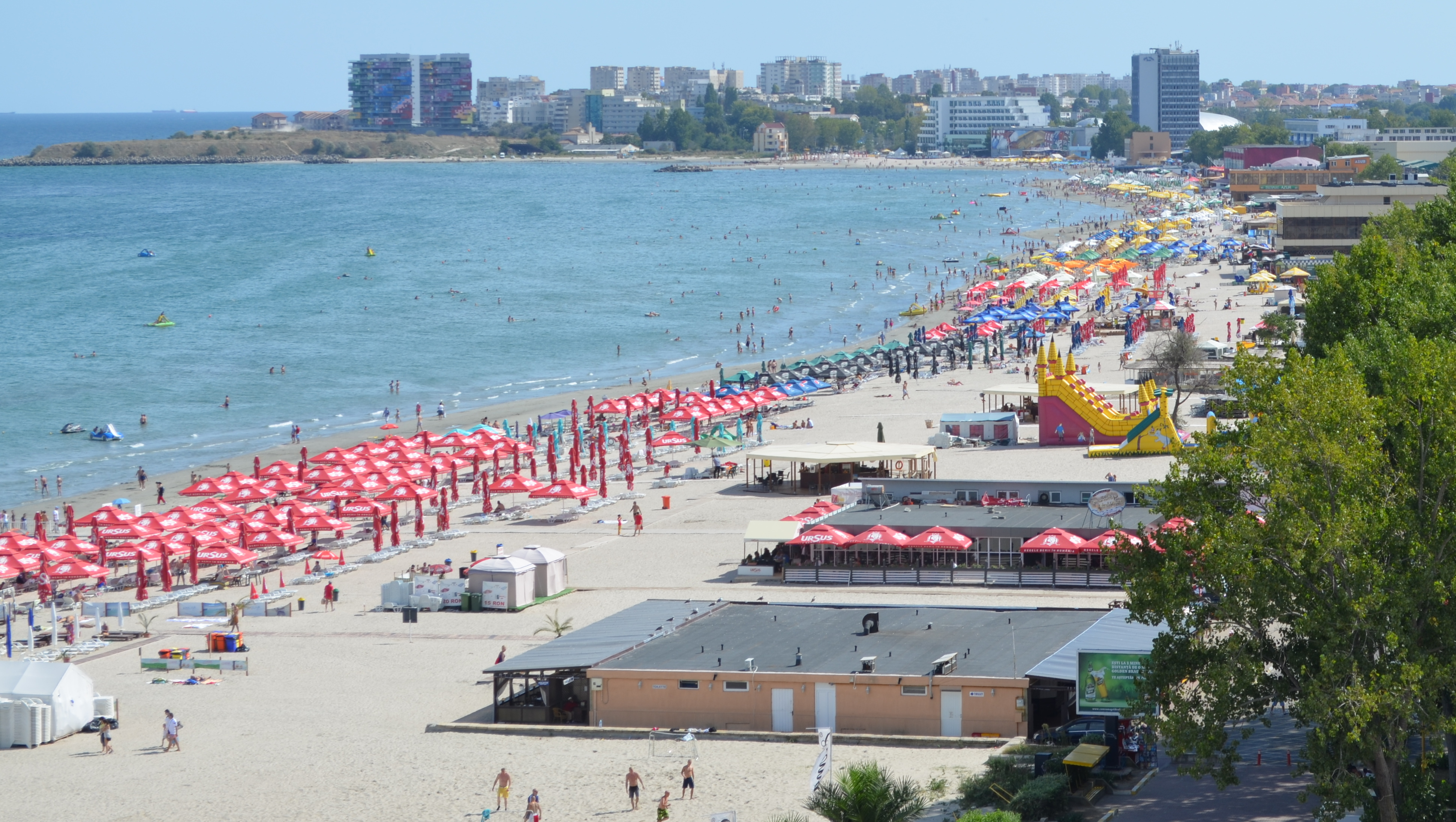
Mamaia, view towards Constanța

Constanța has a humid subtropical climate (Cfa in Köppen climate classification). Summer (early June to mid September) is hot and sunny, with a July and August average of 23 °C (73 °F). Most summer days see a gentle breeze refreshing the daytime temperatures. Nights are warm and somewhat muggy because of the heat stored by the sea.

Autumn starts in mid or late September with warm and sunny days. September can be warmer than June, owing to the warmth accumulated by the Black Sea during the summer. The first frost occurs on average in mid November.

Winter is milder than other cities in southern Romania. Snow is not abundant but the weather can be very windy and unpleasant. Winter arrives much later than inland and December weather is often mild with high temperatures reaching 8 °C (46 °F) – 12 °C (54 °F). The average January temperature is 1 °C (34 °F). Winter storms, which occur when the sea becomes particularly treacherous, are a common occurrence between December and March.

Spring arrives early but it is quite cool. Often in April and May the Black Sea coast is one of the coolest places in Romania found at an altitude lower than 500 m (1,640 ft).

Four of the warmest seven years from 1889 to 2008 have occurred after the year 2000 (2000, 2001, 2007 and 2008). As of September 2009, the winter and the summer of 2007 were respectively the warmest and the second warmest in recorded history with monthly averages for January (+6.5 °C) and June (+23.0 °C) breaking all-time records. Overall, 2007 was the warmest year since 1889 when weather recording began.

Climate data for Constanța (1991–2020 normals, extremes 1901-present)
Month	Jan	Feb	Mar	Apr	May	Jun	Jul	Aug	Sep	Oct	Nov	Dec	Year
Record high °C (°F)	19.1 (66.4)	24.5 (76.1)	30.8 (87.4)	31.9 (89.4)	36.9 (98.4)	36.9 (98.4)	38.5 (101.3)	36.8 (98.2)	34.8 (94.6)	32.5 (90.5)	26.5 (79.7)	21.0 (69.8)	38.5 (101.3)
Mean daily maximum °C (°F)	4.7 (40.5)	6.5 (43.7)	10.1 (50.2)	14.7 (58.5)	20.6 (69.1)	25.5 (77.9)	27.9 (82.2)	27.9 (82.2)	23.3 (73.9)	17.6 (63.7)	11.9 (53.4)	6.6 (43.9)	16.4 (61.6)
Daily mean °C (°F)	1.4 (34.5)	2.7 (36.9)	6.2 (43.2)	10.8 (51.4)	16.6 (61.9)	21.5 (70.7)	23.9 (75.0)	23.9 (75.0)	19.2 (66.6)	13.8 (56.8)	8.4 (47.1)	3.2 (37.8)	12.6 (54.7)
Mean daily minimum °C (°F)	−1.2 (29.8)	0.0 (32.0)	3.3 (37.9)	7.7 (45.9)	13.1 (55.6)	17.6 (63.7)	19.7 (67.5)	19.9 (67.8)	15.6 (60.1)	10.8 (51.4)	5.7 (42.3)	0.6 (33.1)	9.4 (48.9)
Record low °C (°F)	−24.7 (−12.5)	−25.0 (−13.0)	−12.8 (9.0)	−4.5 (23.9)	1.8 (35.2)	6.4 (43.5)	7.6 (45.7)	8.0 (46.4)	1.0 (33.8)	−12.4 (9.7)	−11.7 (10.9)	−18.6 (−1.5)	−25.0 (−13.0)
Average precipitation mm (inches)	35.6 (1.40)	25.9 (1.02)	37.4 (1.47)	31.9 (1.26)	44.8 (1.76)	42.3 (1.67)	41.9 (1.65)	36.3 (1.43)	44.0 (1.73)	44.4 (1.75)	41.5 (1.63)	41.1 (1.62)	467.1 (18.39)
Average precipitation days (≥ 1.0 mm)	5.6	4.6	5.5	5.2	5.9	5.2	4.2	2.9	4.1	4.9	5.2	6.2	59.5
Average snowy days	7.83	5.25	2.83	0.21	0.04	0	0	0	0	0.04	1.29	4.5	21.99
Average relative humidity (%)	86	85	85	83	81	78	76	77	79	82	86	88	82
Mean monthly sunshine hours	89	112	143	198	270	294	331	305	229	157	100	86	2,314
Source 1: NOAA, meteomanz(snow days 2000-2023, extremes 2021-present)
Source 2: Romanian National Statistic Institute (extremes 1901–2000), Deutscher Wetterdienst (humidity, 1973–1993)

Climate data for Constanța (1961–1990 normals)
Month	Jan	Feb	Mar	Apr	May	Jun	Jul	Aug	Sep	Oct	Nov	Dec	Year
Mean daily maximum °C (°F)	3.7 (38.7)	4.9 (40.8)	8.1 (46.6)	13.8 (56.8)	19.3 (66.7)	23.8 (74.8)	25.9 (78.6)	25.8 (78.4)	22.4 (72.3)	17.0 (62.6)	11.6 (52.9)	6.4 (43.5)	15.2 (59.4)
Daily mean °C (°F)	0.5 (32.9)	1.6 (34.9)	4.6 (40.3)	9.9 (49.8)	15.5 (59.9)	20.0 (68.0)	22.0 (71.6)	21.8 (71.2)	18.3 (64.9)	13.1 (55.6)	8.0 (46.4)	3.2 (37.8)	11.5 (52.8)
Mean daily minimum °C (°F)	−2.3 (27.9)	−1.0 (30.2)	2.1 (35.8)	6.9 (44.4)	12.1 (53.8)	16.2 (61.2)	18.0 (64.4)	17.9 (64.2)	14.6 (58.3)	9.8 (49.6)	5.0 (41.0)	0.5 (32.9)	8.3 (47.0)
Average precipitation mm (inches)	30 (1.2)	29 (1.1)	26 (1.0)	30 (1.2)	38 (1.5)	40 (1.6)	30 (1.2)	33 (1.3)	29 (1.1)	31 (1.2)	42 (1.7)	38 (1.5)	396 (15.6)
Average snowfall cm (inches)	7.0 (2.8)	7.0 (2.8)	4.2 (1.7)	0.0 (0.0)	0.0 (0.0)	0.0 (0.0)	0.0 (0.0)	0.0 (0.0)	0.0 (0.0)	0.0 (0.0)	5.5 (2.2)	3.4 (1.3)	27.1 (10.8)
Average precipitation days (≥ 1.0 mm)	5	5	5	5	6	6	5	3	3	4	6	6	59
Average dew point °C (°F)	−1.7 (28.9)	−1.1 (30.0)	2.0 (35.6)	6.5 (43.7)	11.7 (53.1)	15.3 (59.5)	17.0 (62.6)	16.9 (62.4)	14.1 (57.4)	9.7 (49.5)	5.2 (41.4)	1.3 (34.3)	8.1 (46.5)
Mean monthly sunshine hours	83.4	85.7	133.9	179.7	264.1	282.2	319.9	311.7	241.1	182.3	101.1	80.7	2,265.8
Source: NOAA

== Demographics ==
Historical population of Constanța
Year	Population	%±
1853	5,204	—
1879	5,430	4.3%
1900	12,725	134.3%
1912 census	27,201	113.7%
1930 census	59,164	117.5%
1941 census	80,028	35.2%
1948 census	78,586	−1.8%
1956 census	99,676	26.8%
1966 census	150,276	50.7%
1977 census	256,978	71%
1992 census	350,581	36.4%
2002 census	310,471	−11.4%
2011 census	283,872	−8.6%
2021 census	263,688	−7.1%

As of 2021, 263,688 inhabitants live within the city limits, a decrease from the figure recorded at the 2011 census.

After Bucharest, the capital city, Romania has a number of major cities that are roughly equal in size: Constanța, Iași, Cluj-Napoca, and Timișoara.

The metropolitan area of Constanța has a permanent population of 425,916 inhabitants (2011), i.e. 61% of the total population of the county, and a minimum average of 120,000 per day, tourists or seasonal workers, transient people during the high tourist season.

Ethnicity	1853	1896	1912	1930	1956	1966	2002	2011	2021
All	5,204	10,419	27,201	60,106	99,676	150,276	310,471	283,872	263,688
Romanian	279 (5.4%)	2,519 (24.1%)	15,663 (57.6%)	40,857 (68.0%)	90,232 (90.5%)	138,955 (92.5%)	286,332 (92.2%)	235,925 (83.11%)	201,648 (76.47%)
Tatar	1,853 (35.6%)	2,202 (21.1%)	277 (1%)	573 (1.0%)	1,968 (2.0%)	2,682 (1.8%)	8,724 (2.8%)	7,367 (2.6%)	6,802 (2.6%)
Turkish	104 (2.0%)	2,202 (21.1%)	2,451 (9%)	3,491 (5.8%)	3,260 (3.3%)	4,840 (3.2%)	9,018 (2.9%)	6,525 (2.3%)	4,383 (1.7%)
Greek	1,542 (29.6%)	2,460 (23.6%)	3,170 (11.6%)	3,708 (6.2%)	791 (0.8%)	559 (0.4%)	546 (0.17%)	231 (0.08%)	192 (0.07%)
Bulgarian	342 (6.5%)	1,060 (10.1%)	940 (3.4%)	1,196 (2.0%)	162 (0.2%)	191 (0.1%)	48 (0.01%)	18 (0.01%)	42 (0.02%)
Jewish	344 (6.6%)	855 (8.2%)	1,266 (4.6%)	1,678 (2.8%)	585 (0.6%)	240 (0.2%)	44 (0.01%)	31 (0.01%)	29 (0.01%)
Roma	127 (2.5%)	n/a	n/a	282 (0.5%)	4 (0.0%)	35 (0.0%)	2,962 (0.97%)	2,225 (0.78%)	1,515 (0.57%)
Ethnicity information not available	n/a	n/a	n/a	n/a	n/a	n/a	10 (0.003%)	29,411 (10.36%)	46,990 (17.82%)

== Economy ==
Drawing of the port in 1856.

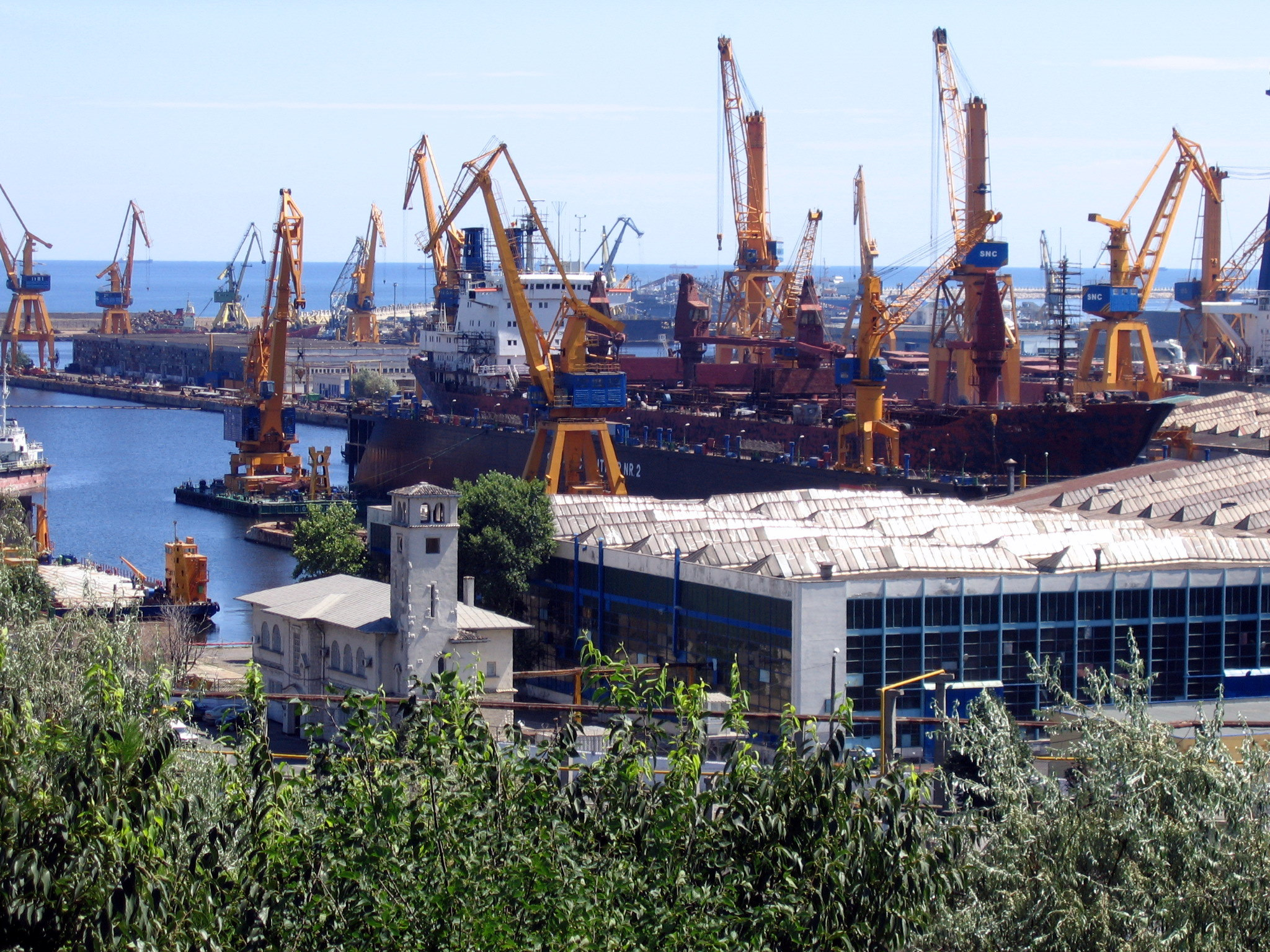
View toward Constanța shipyard

As of 1878, Constanța was called a "poor Turkish fishing village." As of 1920, it was called "flourishing", and was known for exporting oil and cereals.

Constanța is one of Romania's main industrial, commercial and tourist centers. During the first half of 2008, some 3,144 new companies were established in Constanța and its neighbouring localities, a number surpassed in Romania only in Bucharest and Cluj County. The Port of Constanța is the largest on the Black Sea and the fourth largest in Europe. The city also boasts a comparably large shipyard.

Constanța has been promoted as a seaside resort since the time of Carol I of Romania, although the development of naval industry has had a detrimental effect on the city's beaches.

== Transport ==
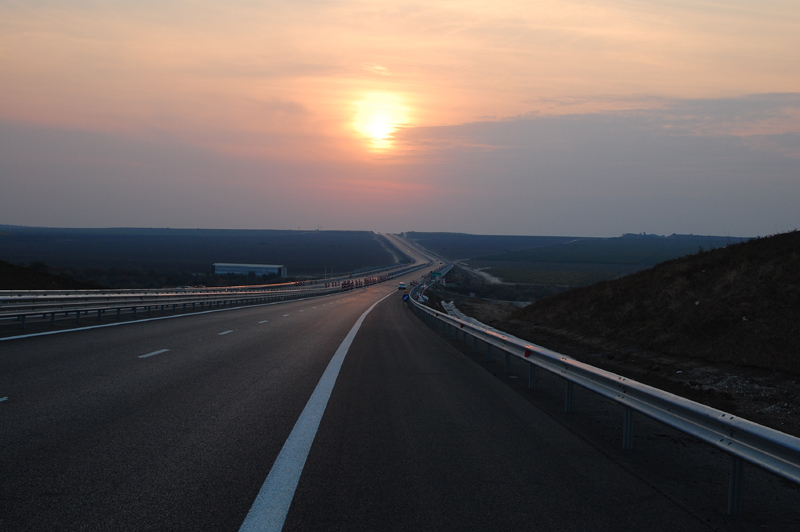
A2 motorway

The opening, in 1895, of the railway to Bucharest, which crosses the Danube River at the bridge at Cernavodă, brought Constanța considerable transit trade in grain and petroleum, which are largely exported; coal and coke head the list of imports, followed by machinery, iron goods, cotton and woollen fabrics.

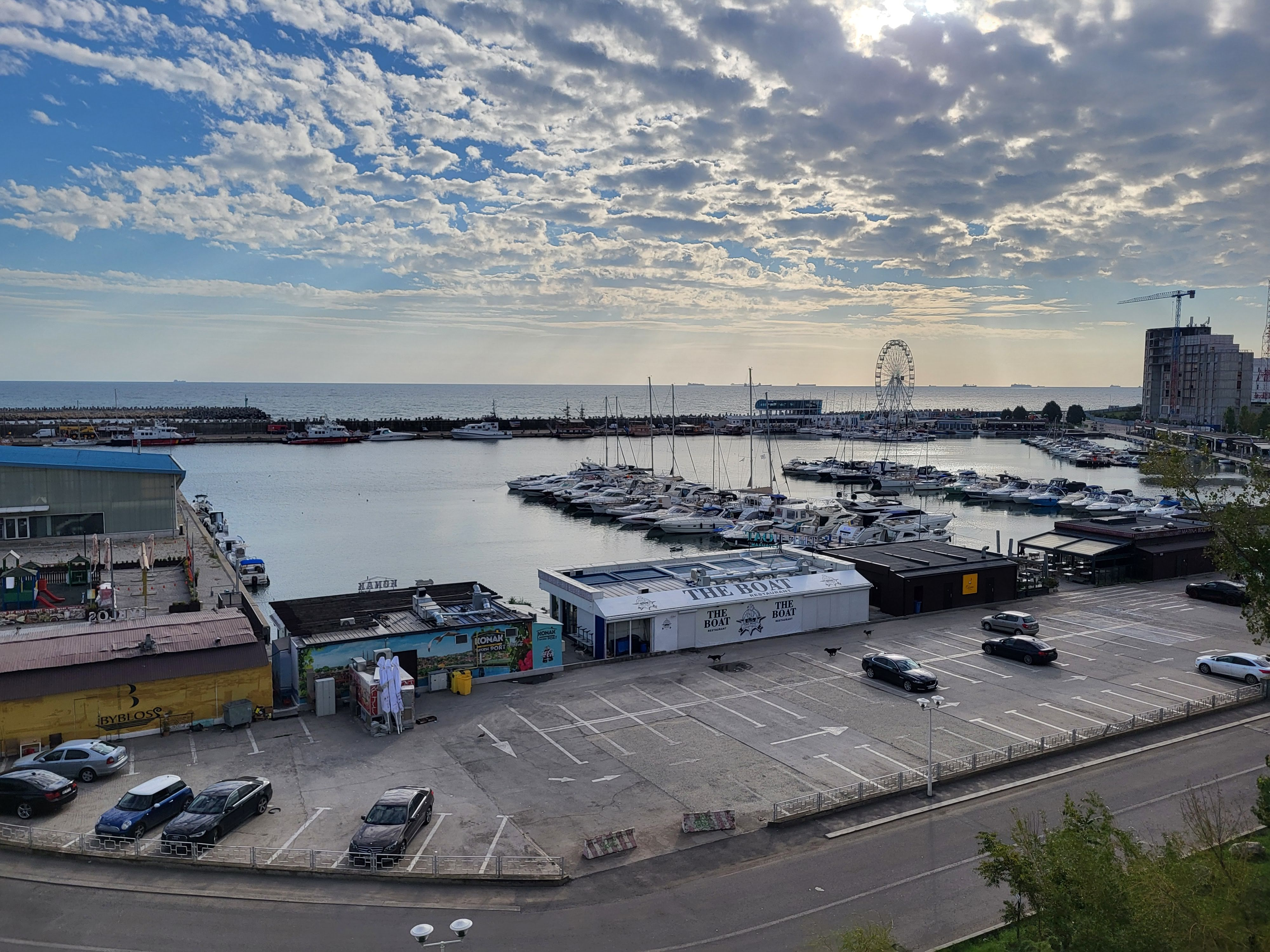
Touristic port of Constanta

The Port of Constanța includes the North Port and the South Port, and is the fourth largest in Europe. It is protected by breakwaters, with a lighthouse at the entrance. The port is sheltered from the northerly winds, but southerly winds can prove dangerous at times. The Black Sea squadron of the Romanian fleet is stationed here. A large canal (the Danube-Black Sea Canal) connects the Danube River to the Black Sea at Constanța.

The city is served by Mihail Kogălniceanu International Airport.

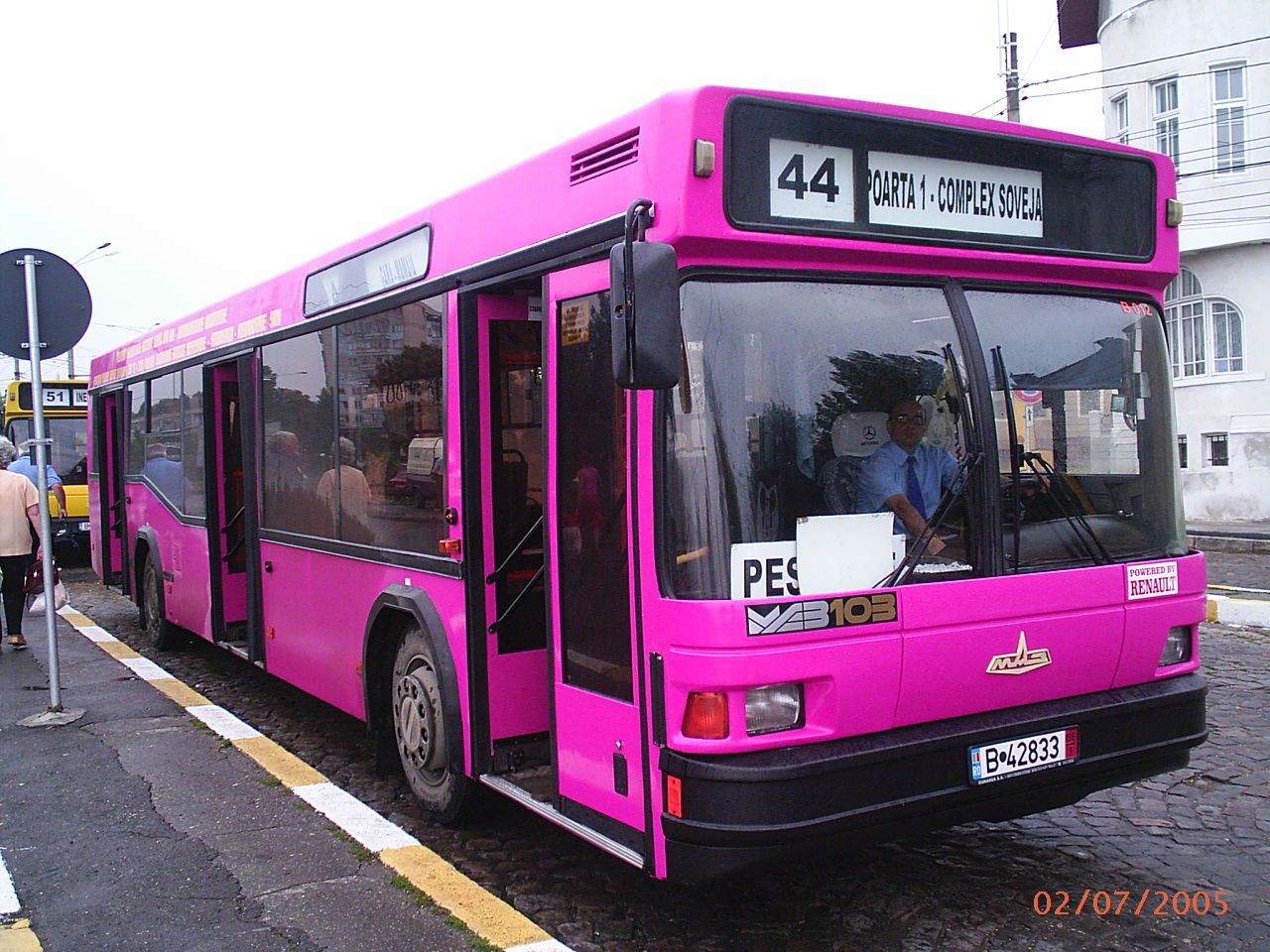
One of Constanța's distinctive pink MAZ buses, formerly running on Route 44

Constanța's public transport system is run by CT Bus (formerly Regia Autonomă de Transport în Comun Constanța - RATC), and consists of 19 year-round bus lines, and two seasonal lines, including a sightseeing double decker open top bus line.

In the early 2000s, the city bought 130 new MAZ buses to replace the aging fleet of DAC buses. There is also a fleet of double decker Volvo buses that run in the summer, providing access to and from the resort of Mamaia. As of October 2013, the cost of a return ticket is 3 lei.

Trams were active until the late 2000s when they were decommissioned in favour of long-wheelbase buses. Two trolley bus lines were active until the early 2010s – now also decommissioned and replaced by buses.

In 2019 Constanta's new Mercedes-Benz minibusses entered service.

In October 2022 Constanta's new BYD electric buses entered service with CT Bus.

Constanța is one of the main focuses of the Rail-2-Sea project which aims to connect it to the Polish Baltic Sea port of Gdynia with a 3,663-kilometre (2,276 mi) long railway line passing through Romania, Hungary, Slovakia and Poland.

== Politics ==
=== List of mayors (1990–present) ===
Vergil Chițac (National Liberal Party) has been mayor since 2020 and was re-elected in 2024.

The mayors elected since the 1989 revolution have been the following:

Nº	Name	Term start	Term end	Political party
1	Radu Marian	1 January 1990	10 January 1990	National Salvation Front (FSN)
2	Călin Marinescu	January 1990	August 1990	National Salvation Front (FSN)
3	Adrian Manole	August 1990	1991	National Salvation Front (FSN)
4	Tudor Baltă	1991	1992	National Salvation Front (FSN)
5	Corneliu Neagoe	1992	1996	Christian Democratic National Peasants' Party (PNȚCD)
6	Gheorghe Mihăeș	1996	2000	Democratic Party (PD)
7	Radu Mazăre	2000	2015	Independent, Social Democratic Party (PSD)
8	Decebal Făgădău	2015	2020	Social Democratic Party (PSD)
9	Vergil Chițac	2020		National Liberal Party (PNL)

=== City Council ===
The Constanța Municipal Council is made up of 27 councilors, with the following party composition:

Party	Seats in 2004	Seats in 2008	Seats in 2012	Seats in 2016	Seats in 2020	Council following the 2020 local elections
Social Democratic Party (PSD)	15	19	15	13	8	
National Liberal Party (PNL)	6	3	4	10	10	
Save Romania Union (USR)	N/A	N/A	N/A	3	9	
People's Movement Party (PMP)	N/A	N/A	N/A	3	0	
Independent	N/A	N/A	N/A	1	N/A	
Democratic Party/Democratic Liberal Party (PD/PDL)	3	5	3	N/A	N/A	
National Union for the Progress of Romania (UNPR)	N/A	N/A	3	0	0	
People's Party – Dan Diaconescu (PP-DD)	N/A	N/A	3	N/A	N/A	
Christian Democratic National Peasants' Party (PNȚCD)	0	0	1	0	0	
Greater Romania Party (PRM)	3	0	0	0	0	

== Sports ==
Constanța is home to several football clubs, with FCV Farul Constanța playing in the Romanian first division. The rugby team RC Farul Constanța play in Divizia Națională. The Romanian handball clubs, HCD Constanța is also based in the city.

== International relations ==
=== Twin towns – sister cities ===
Constanța is twinned with:

- Alexandria, Egypt
- Brest, France
- Callao, Peru
- Cartagena, Colombia
- Fort Lauderdale, United States
- Havana, Cuba
- Istanbul, Turkey
- İzmir, Turkey
- Makassar, Indonesia
- Mobile, United States
- Novorossiysk, Russia
- Odesa, Ukraine
- Rotterdam, Netherlands
- Saint Petersburg, Russia
- Santos, Brazil
- Shanghai, China
- Silivri, Turkey
- Sulmona, Italy
- Tepebaşı, Turkey
- Thessaloniki, Greece
- Trapani, Italy
- Turku, Finland
- Yokohama, Japan

=== Consulates ===
- Consulate General of Russia
- Consulate General of Turkey
- Honorary Consulate of Albania
- Honorary Consulate of Austria
- Honorary Consulate of Cyprus
- Honorary Consulate of Estonia
- Honorary Consulate of Finland
- Honorary Consulate of France
- Honorary Consulate of Italy
- Honorary Consulate of Kazakhstan
- Honorary Consulate of Lebanon
- Honorary Consulate of the Netherlands
- Honorary Consulate of North Macedonia
- Honorary Consulate of Norway
- Honorary Consulate of Syria

== Natives of Constanța ==
- Kázím Abdulakim (died 1917), Crimean Tatar hero of the Romanian Army.
- Haig Acterian (1904–1943), theatre director, journalist and fascist activist.
- Horia Agarici (1911–1982), aviator and World War II flying ace.
- Simona Amânar (born 1979), Olympic gold medal-winning gymnast.
- Elena Băsescu (born 1980), Member of the European Parliament.
- Victoria Bezetti (1937–2022), classical soprano.
- T. O. Bobe (born 1969), poet and screenwriter.
- Sebastian Bodu (born 1970), politician.
- Ovidiu Constantinescu (1933–2012), mycologist.
- Constanța Crăciun (1914–2002), politician and educator.
- Ligia Deca (born 1982), politician.
- Nicholas Georgescu-Roegen (1906–1994), mathematician.
- Simona Halep (born 1991), tennis player, businesswoman.
- Puiu Hașotti (born 1953), MP and senator.
- Sîdîyîk Ibrahim H. Mîrzî (1909–1959), Crimean Tatar spiritual leader, imam, Mufti of the Muslim community of Romania, and activist.
- Iusein Ibram (1953–2025), politician.
- Refiyîk Kadír (1879–1929), Crimean Tatar officer regarded as a hero of the Romanian Army.
- Ramona Mănescu (born 1972), Member of the European Parliament.
- Radu Mazăre (born 1968), ex-politician.
- Vasile Moldoveanu (born 1935), operatic tenor.
- Taner Murat (born 1959), writer, poet and translator.
- Teodor T. Nalbant (1933–2011), ichthyologist.
- Nicolae Nemirschi (born 1959), Environment Minister (2008–2009).
- Alexandru Pesamosca (1930–2011), surgeon and pediatrician.
- Cătălina Ponor (born 1987), Olympic gold medal-winning gymnast.
- Marianna Radev (1913–1973), operatic contralto.
- Jacques Schnier (1898–1988), artist, sculptor, author, educator, and engineer.
- Cella Serghi (1907–1992), prose writer.
- Sevil Shhaideh (born 1964), economist, civil servant and politician.
- Alexandra Sidorovici (1906–2000), communist politician.
- Anastasia Soare (born 1957), American billionaire businesswoman.
- Dragoș Sprînceană (born 1979), businessman, political advisor, and informal diplomat.
- Alexandra Stan (born 1989), singer and model.
- Sebastian Stan (born 1982), actor.
- Dan Stoenescu (born 1980), diplomat, political scientist and journalist.
- Grigore-Kalev Stoicescu (born 1965), diplomat and politician.
- Harry Tavitian (born 1952), jazz pianist and singer.
- Ismail H. A. Ziyaeddin (1912–1996), poet.

== Education ==
Local high schools include Mircea cel Bătrân National College, Mihai Eminescu National College and Ovidius High School

Colleges include Ovidius University of Constanța and Mircea cel Bătrân Naval Academy

== Studies ==
- Born, Robert (2012). Die Christianisierung der Städte der Provinz Scythia Minor. Ein Beitrag zum spätantiken Urbanismus auf dem Balkan [The Christianisation of the cities of Scythia Minor. A contribution to late antique urbanism in the Balkans]. Wiesbaden: Reichert, ISBN 978-3-89500-782-8, pp. 19–72.
- Livia Buzoianu and Maria Barbulescu, "Tomis", in Dimitrios V. Grammenos and Elias K. Petropoulos (eds), Ancient Greek Colonies in the Black Sea, Vol. 1 (Oxford, Archaeopress, 2001) (BAR International Series; 1675 (1–2)), 287–336.
