= Nicolae Nemirschi =

Romanian politician (born 1959)

Nicolae Nemirschi (born March 9, 1959) is a Romanian engineer and politician. A member of the Social Democratic Party (PSD), he was Minister of the Environment and Sustainable Development in the Emil Boc cabinet from 2008 to 2009.

He is married and has two children.

== Biography ==
He was born in Constanţa and attended the Bucharest Civil Engineering Institute from 1979 to 1984, studying in the Faculty of Civil Engineering Plumbing. From 2005 to 2007, he worked on a master's degree in European Social Law at Ovidius University, and since 2008 has been pursuing a doctorate at the Bucharest University of Agronomical Sciences and Veterinary Medicine. From 1984 to 1987, Nemirschi worked in Constanţa as an engineer at a hydro-technical construction facility for the Danube–Black Sea Canal. From 1987 to 1990, he headed the technical division of the Mamaia hotel and restaurant enterprise. From 1990 to 1992, he was assistant director of a travel agency in that town, while from 1992 to 2000, he was shareholder and administrator at another tourist facility there. From 1998 to 2000, he headed the Constanţa chapter of the national assessors' association, also leading the Mamaia employers' association from 1999 to 2000. From 2000 to 2001, he led the heritage directorate at Constanţa City Hall, and from 2001 to 2004, he was the city's chief architect in the urbanism directorate.

Nemirschi joined the PSD in 2002. From 2004 to 2008, he was the city's deputy mayor; in 2008, in addition to serving as city councillor, he was vice president of the national coastal area committee. From 2007 to 2008, he was president of the Constanța metropolitan area; reportedly, the institution's only activity during his term was the raising of informational placards in the area's towns. Following the 2008 election, he was named Environment Minister. Among his initiatives were a tax on plastic bags and the Green House programme for heating homes with solar, biomass or geothermal energy; he also announced a planned crackdown on Romanians registering more heavily polluting automobiles in Bulgaria. He supported legislation to impose a uniform tax on polluters based on the quantities they emit by 2010, in particular aimed at alleviating serious air quality issues in Bucharest, as well as granting state subsidies for replacing outdated tractors. Nemirschi is close to his former superior, Constanţa Mayor Radu Ștefan Mazăre, and approved a Constanţa-Mamaia highway shortly after taking office; this had been blocked by two of Nemirschi's predecessors, Sulfina Barbu and Attila Korodi. He defended his ties to the mayor (who pushed for his appointment), noting he was the first government minister from Constanţa since the 1989 Revolution, and asserted there was no reason for environmental concern over the highway. Among his other priorities were solving the issue of garbage heaps in line with European Union directives, remaining advised of the Roşia Montană mining project, and addressing the impact of global warming on Romania, particularly when it comes to desertification and the spread of the Oltenian Sahara. Together with his PSD colleagues, Nemirschi resigned from the cabinet on October 1, 2009, in protest at the dismissal of vice prime minister and Interior Minister Dan Nica.
