= Hünkar Mosque, Constanța =

Mosque in Constanța, Romania

Hünkar Mosque
- Geamia Hunchiar
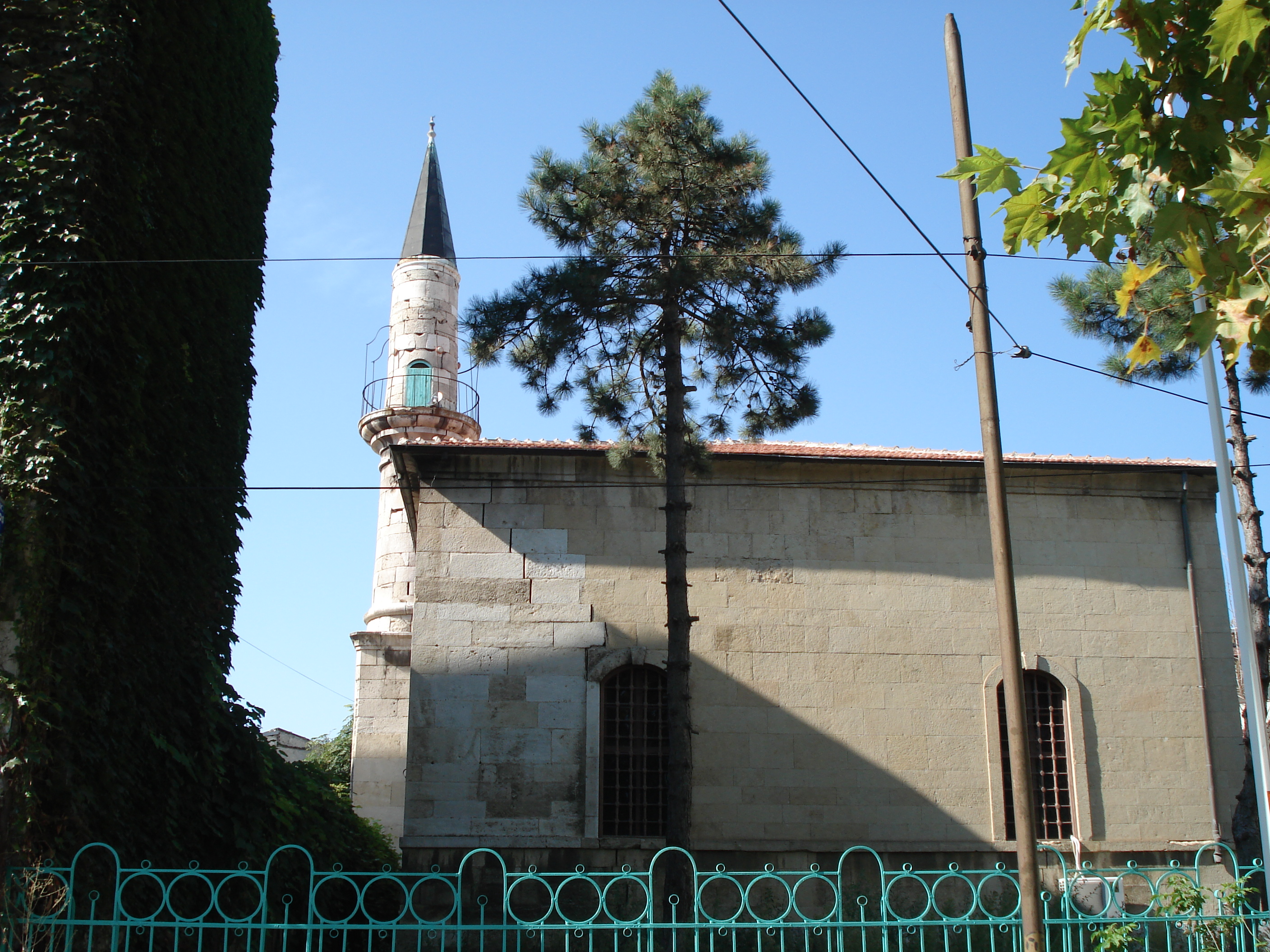

- Location within Romania

Religion
- Affiliation: Islam

Location
- Location: Constanța, Romania
- Interactive map of Hünkar Mosque
- Coordinates: 44.17560289°N 28.6550257°E

Architecture
- Type: mosque

The Hünkar Mosque (Romanian: Geamia Hunchiar; Turkish: Hünkar Camii, lit. "Sovereign's Mosque") is a mosque located at 41 Tomis Boulevard, Constanța, Romania.

The mosque was completed in 1869, nine years before Northern Dobruja became part of Romania, during the reign of Ottoman Sultan Abdulaziz. Hence, it is also known as the Aziziye Mosque, and his tughra features on the left side of the entrance, within an oval medallion of marble. The minaret is 24 meters high, dominating its surroundings. The building is in a simple Ottoman style, with a tile roof, and is cube-shaped like the Kaaba. It is made of carved stone that came from the entrance gate to the Ottoman fortress, the walls of which were demolished in 1828. In turn, the stone for those walls came from the Greco-Roman vestiges of ancient Tomis. The interior carpet was donated in 2001 by Turkish President Ahmet Necdet Sezer.

During the interwar period, the mosque came close to demolition, with proponents arguing that the structurally weak minaret posed a threat to passersby. Historian Nicolae Iorga successfully refuted this claim. During World War II, Soviet bombing seriously damaged the mosque, and its total razing was again suggested. It underwent restoration in the years after the Romanian Revolution, at the same time becoming choked by new construction in the neighborhood.

The mosque is listed as a historic monument by Romania's Ministry of Culture and Religious Affairs.
