= Mihai Eminescu National College (Constanța) =

- Colegiul Național "Mihai Eminescu"

Location
- Strada Traian, Nr. 19; Constanța, Constanța County; Romania
- Coordinates: 44.174676°N 28.655210°E

Information
- Type: Public
- Established: 1919
- Principal: Bianca Ibadula
- Website: cnmecta.ro

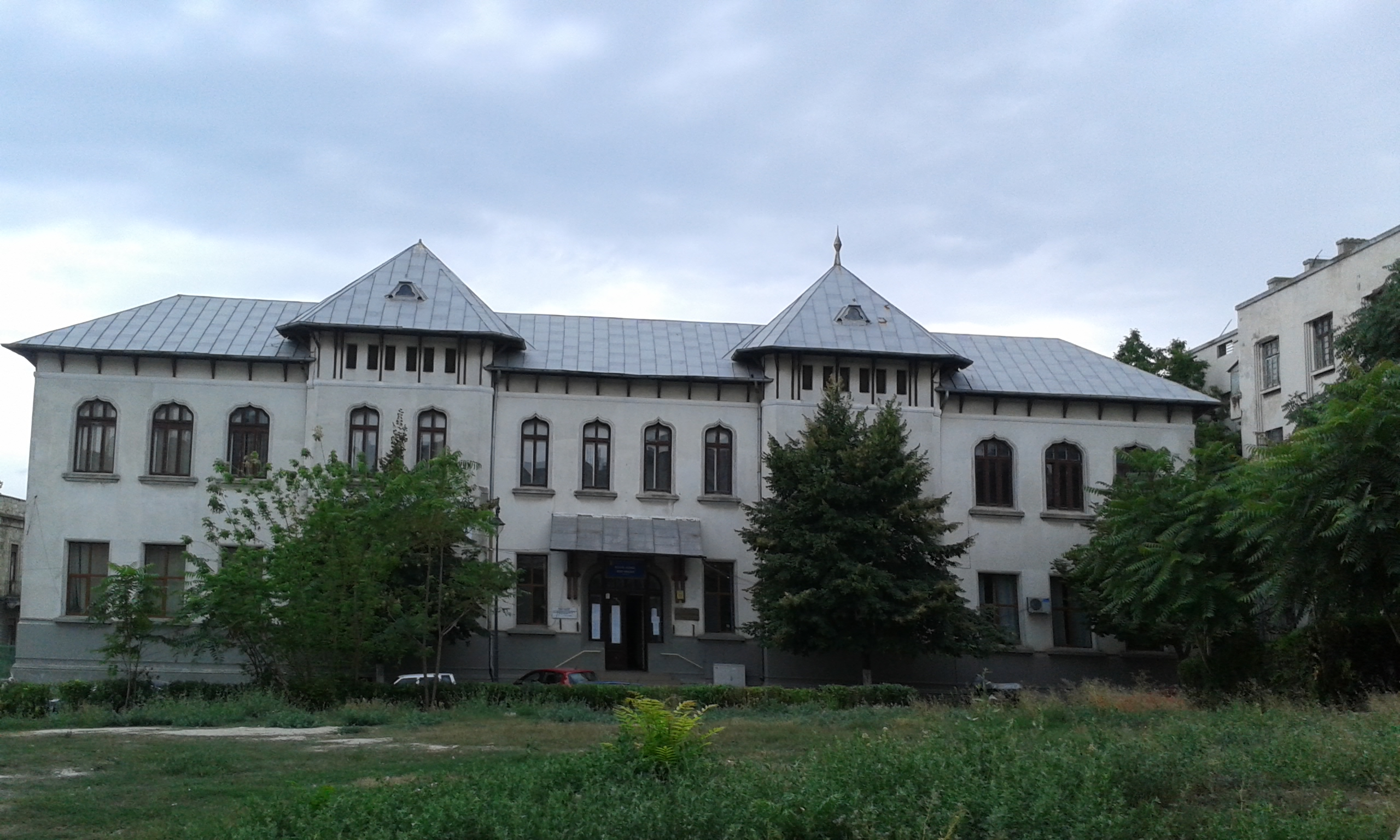
Mihai Eminescu National College

Mihai Eminescu National College (Romanian: Colegiul Național "Mihai Eminescu") is a high-school located at 19 Traian Street in Constanța, Romania.

== History ==
The school was founded in 1919 under the name "Domnița Ileana" Girls' Secondary School (Școala Secundară de fete in Romanian) as counterpart to the Mircea cel Bătrân Boys' High School (Liceul de băieți). The college was named in the 1970s after the Romanian national poet Mihai Eminescu. Until 1990 it was called Mihai Eminescu Natural Science High School (Liceul de Științe ale Naturii). In 1990, the name was changed to Mihai Eminescu Theoretical High School (Liceul Teoretic) and in 2005 was given the National College (Colegiu Național) title, thus becoming Mihai Eminescu National College (C.N.M.E.), as it is known today.

== Description ==
The high school's personnel is highly trained, some of the most prestigious local teachers being employed here. Many of them authored scientific studies or teach at the local Ovidius University.

The High School has 23 classrooms and many offices and laboratories including a history cabinet, a geography cabinet, a chemistry laboratory, and a biology laboratory with an annexed greenhouse. The library has over 40,000 books covering all domains and a spacious reading room. There is also a well-equipped gymnasium and two medical rooms. The high school's students have won many sporting and educational events.

The Mihai Eminescu National College is known today as one of the most prestigious high schools in Constanța.

The school building, built 1906 to 1908, is listed as a historic monument by Romania's Ministry of Culture and Religious Affairs.

Beneath the building's foundation there are under the city's protection several high value historical ruins.
