= Genoese Lighthouse =

- Farul Genovez
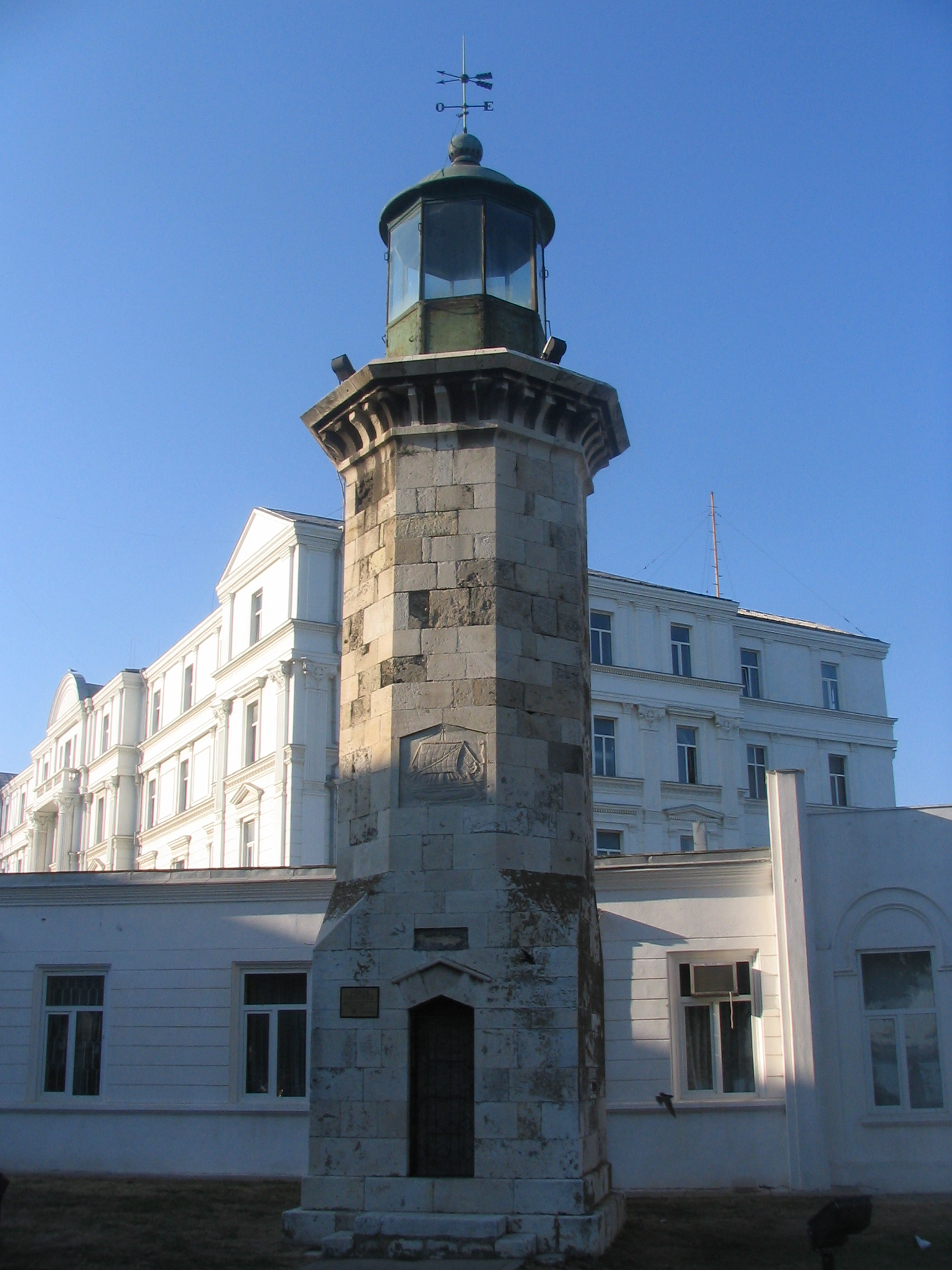
- The Genoese Lighthouse, Constanța
- Interactive map of Genoese Lighthouse
- Location: Constanța, Romania
- Coordinates: 44°10′20″N 28°39′53″E
- Completion date: 1860–1861

The Genoese Lighthouse (Romanian: Farul Genovez) is a lighthouse and historic monument situated on the waterfront of the city of Constanța, Romania, behind a group of statues which has in its center the bust of Mihai Eminescu, sculpted by Oscar Han. It is located near Constanța Casino.

Sources differ on the lighthouse's exact height, variously giving figures from around 8 meters to as much as 21 meters depending on whether the measurement is taken from ground level, from the surrounding terrace, or above sea level. The lighthouse is rectangular at its base to a height of about three and a half meters, and is octagonal above that. The interior of the lighthouse is cylindrical, with a spiral staircase in stone. The structure itself stands upon a pedestal base consisting of two steps, and is finished at the top with brackets supporting the eaves, upon which the metal housing of the lantern room also forms the roof.

== Name and origins ==
A longstanding local tradition holds that an original lighthouse was built around 1300 by the Genoese who traded at the port, to guide ships at sea from a range of about two nautical miles out to the small port of Constanța. This account is disputed by historians of the city, and no historical documentation is known to confirm Genoese construction of a lighthouse at the site. Local historian Petre Covacef has argued that the name more likely derives from a description applied by the Ottoman Turks, who ruled the region until 1878: he suggests that, impressed by the thick-walled stone construction they encountered in Constanța, they referred to it in their own language as Geneviz Calee ("Genoese fortress"), a label he argues came to be applied to several structures in the city, including a Genoese quay and Genoese warehouses, in addition to the lighthouse.

== Construction ==
The present lighthouse was completed around 1860 by French-Armenian engineer Artin Aslan, by order of the British-owned Danube and Black Sea Railway Company, which was then modernizing the port of Constanța and constructing the Cernavodă–Constanța railway; Romanian sources vary in giving the construction period as 1858–1860 or 1860–1861. According to an account preserved within Constanța's Armenian community, Aslan had been wounded while serving during the Crimean War and was taken in to recover at an inn standing near the ruins of the old lighthouse; there he fell in love with Mairam, a niece of the innkeeper's widow, and married her, subsequently settling permanently in Constanța. The year of the couple's marriage is said to coincide with the year construction of the lighthouse was completed.

The lighthouse operated with a static (non-rotating) light and remained in service until 1913, when it was decommissioned in favor of a new lighthouse, named for King Carol I, built on the breakwater of the commercial port.

== Restoration and relighting ==
Beginning in 2015, the Constanța city hall and the local Armenian community undertook a joint project to restore the lighthouse's original lighting system, including its lens, glass core and support structure. In February 2020, following the completion of this work, the lighthouse was illuminated again for the first time since its decommissioning in 1913; the new light source was positioned so as not to interfere with maritime navigation in the port of Constanța.

== See also ==
- Italians in Romania
