= Ovidius High School =

Ovidius High School Liceul Teoretic "Ovidius"

Address
- Stradela Basarabi, Nr. 2 Constanța, Constanța County 900710; Romania
- Coordinates: 44°10′18″N 28°38′07″E

Information
- Founded: 27 May 1955; 69 years ago
- Director: Cristina Anghel
- Website: liceulovidius.ro

Ovidius High School (Romanian: Liceul Teoretic "Ovidius") is a public high school located at 2, Basarabi Alley, Constanța, Romania. It was founded on 27 May 1955, by its first director, Alexandru Ștefănescu.

== History ==
Established in 1955 under the name "Secondary School No. 3", it became in 1965 "High School No. 3", although it was also a gymnasium school. In 1972, Constanța was visited by cultural personalities from 17 countries (including Italy, France, Canada, the United States) and by the mayor of Sulmona, Italy (the birthplace of Ovid). At the time, the mayor of Constanța proposed that the school should bear the name Ovidius, after the Roman poet Ovid, who was banished to Tomis (nowadays Constanța), and died there. His suggestion wasn't followed immediately, however.

In 1975, the school became the "Mathematics and Physics High School No. 1", and in 1982 it was transformed into the "Industrial High School No. 10". After the Romanian Revolution of 1989, on September 1, 1990, it was eventually renamed "Ovidius", as suggested 18 years earlier. Despite the frequent name changes, "Ovidius" remains a prestigious high school of the city and of Constanța County. The students of this school have achieved very good results at national and International Science Olympiads.
