= Victoria Bezetti =

Romanian classical soprano (1937–2022)

Victoria Frincu (11 March 1937 – 27 February 2022), known professionally as Victoria Bezetti, was a Romanian classical soprano who had an active performance career from the 1960s through the 1990s.

Bezetti studied singing with Viorel Ban at the Conservatory of Bucharest. She made her stage debut in 1964 at the Theater of Galati as Gilda in Rigoletto. She was then appointed as a member of the ensemble of the Romanian National Opera, Bucharest, where her career took a very successful course.

She sang a variety of roles from the coloratura as the lyrical vocal category, and especially as a Mozart and Verdi was an interpreter of great recognition. Performances at the National Opera of Belgrade and Sofia, at the Berlin State Opera and the Opera House in Helsinki. On Romanian television, she portrayed the title character in Verdi's La traviata. She was also a prestigious concert and lieder singer. Her complete opera recordings include Vitellia in Mozart's La clemenza di Tito and Violetta in La traviata, both for the Electrecord label.

Victoria Bezetti studied with baritone Mircea Bezetti, later her husband.

Bezetti died on 27 February 2022, at the age of 84.
