= Constanța metropolitan area =

- Metropolitan area
- Country: Romania
- County: Constanța
- Central Municipality: Constanța
- Cities: Năvodari, Ovidiu, Eforie, Murfatlar, Techirghiol
- Other localities: Mihail Kogălniceanu, Cumpăna, Valu lui Traian, Lumina, Tuzla, Agigea, Corbu, Poarta Albă
- Functional: 2007

Area
  - Total: 1,013.5 km^{2} (391.3 sq mi)

Population (2021 census)
  - Total: 415,695
  - Density: 411/km^{2} (1,060/sq mi)
- Time zone: UTC+2 (EET)
  - Summer (DST): UTC+3 (EEST)
- Postal Code: 90wxyz^{1}
- Area code: +40 x41^{2}
- Website: http://www.zmc.ro/
- ^{1}w, x, y, and z are digits that indicate the street, part of the street, or even the building of the address^{2}x is a digit indicating the operator: 2 for the former national operator, Romtelecom, and 3 for the other ground telephone networks

The Constanța metropolitan area, is a metropolitan area, established in 2007, that includes the municipality of Constanța, the towns of Năvodari, Ovidiu, Eforie, Murfatlar, Techirghiol and 8 communes: Mihail Kogălniceanu, Cumpăna, Valu lui Traian, Lumina, Tuzla, Agigea, Corbu and Poarta Albă. According to the 2021 census, it has a population of 415,695, in an area consisting of 16% of Constanța County.

As defined by Eurostat, with 420,241 residents (as of 2015), the Constanța functional urban area is the third most populous in Romania.

Such administrative arrangement existed in an approximative similarity before 1989, when Constanța Municipality also included the city of Mangalia and the communes 23 August and Limanu, together with all the summer resorts located between 23 August and Mangalia (the so-called "Mangalia Nord" resorts area).

However this administrative reform exists only on paper, nothing being done so far to put this decision into practice (e.g. unified local administration and transportation).

== Demographics ==
Population census
Year	2011	2021
Pop.	425,916	415,695
±%	—	−2.4%
