= Romania =

Country in Central and Southeastern Europe

Romania România
- Flag Coat of arms
- Anthem: Deșteaptă-te, române! "Awaken Thee, Romanian!"
- Location of Romania Romania within the European Union
- Capital and largest city: Bucharest; 44°25′N 26°06′E
- Official languages: Romanian
- Ethnic groups (2021) (Note: Excludes people who did not declare an ethnic affiliation in the 2021 census (2,484,926, 13%).): 89.3% Romanians; 6.0% Hungarians; 3.4% Roma; 1.3% others
- Religion (2021): 84.7% Christianity; 73.6% Romanian Orthodoxy; 6.4% Protestantism; 4.4% Catholicism; 0.2% other Christian; 0.8% no religion; 0.4% other; 13.9% unanswered
- Demonym: Romanian
- Government: Unitary semi-presidential republic
  - President: Nicușor Dan
  - Prime Minister: Luca Niculescu
  - President of the Senate: Mircea Abrudean
  - President of the Chamber of Deputies: Sorin Grindeanu
- Legislature: Parliament
  - Upper house: Senate
  - Lower house: Chamber of Deputies

History
  - Principality of Wallachia: 1330–1862
  - Principality of Moldavia: 1346–1862
  - United Principalities: 1859–1881
  - Independence from the Ottoman Empire: 10 May 1877
  - Kingdom of Romania: 1881–1947
  - Great Union: 1 December 1918
  - Socialist Romania: 1947–1989
  - Current constitution: 8 December 1991

Area
  - Total: 238,397 km^{2} (92,046 sq mi) (81st)
  - Water (%): 2.97

Population
  - January 2026 estimate: ▼19,041,322 (65th)
  - 2021 census: ▼19,053,815
  - Density: 79.9/km^{2} (206.9/sq mi) (132nd)
- GDP (PPP): 2026 estimate
  - Total: ▲$942.929 billion (37th)
  - Per capita: ▲$49,628 (44th)
- GDP (nominal): 2026 estimate
  - Total: ▲$470.091 billion (38th)
  - Per capita: ▲$24,741 (53rd)
- Gini (2025): ▼27.3 low inequality
- HDI (2023): ▲0.845 very high (55th)
- Currency: Romanian leu (RON)
- Time zone: UTC+2 (EET)
  - Summer (DST): UTC+3 (EEST)
- Date format: dd.mm.yyyy (CE)
- Calling code: +40
- ISO 3166 code: RO
- Internet TLD: .ro

Romania (Note: /roʊˈmeɪniə/ roh-MAY-nee-ə; Romanian: România [romɨˈni.a]) is a country in Central and Southeastern Europe. It lies on the lower course of the Danube, north of the Balkan Peninsula, and on the northwestern shore of the Black Sea. It borders Ukraine to the north and east, Hungary to the west, Serbia to the southwest, Bulgaria to the south, Moldova to the east, and the Black Sea to the southeast. It is the twelfth-largest country in Europe by area, covering 238,397 km^{2} (92,046 mi^{2}), and the sixth-most populous member state of the European Union, with 19 million inhabitants. The capital, largest city and economic centre is Bucharest. Other major cities include Cluj-Napoca, Iași, Constanța, Timișoara, Brașov and Craiova.

Romania was settled during the Lower Paleolithic. In antiquity its territory was inhabited by the Dacians. Part of it became the Roman province of Dacia after Trajan's Dacian Wars, beginning the process of Romanisation. The modern Romanian state was formed in 1859 through the unification of Moldavia and Wallachia under Alexandru Ioan Cuza, and adopted the name Romania in 1866. Romania gained independence from the Ottoman Empire in 1877, which was recognised by the Treaty of Berlin in 1878, and became the Kingdom of Romania in 1881 under Carol I. As a result of its participation in the Second Balkan War, Romania acquired Southern Dobruja from Bulgaria in 1913, concluded by the Treaty of Bucharest.

During World War I, Romania joined the Allies in 1916. The Great Union was a series of political unions proclaimed in 1918. After World War I, most of the claimed territories from Kingdom of Hungary (parts of Banat, Crișana, Maramureș, Transylvania) were granted to Kingdom of Romania under the Treaty of Trianon in 1920. The union with Bukovina was recognized in 1919 by the Treaty of Saint-Germain and the union with Bessarabia was recognized in 1920 by the Treaty of Paris. Greater Romania was formed, which reached its largest territorial extent. In 1938, King Carol II suspended the constitution and established a royal dictatorship. In 1940, Romania lost Bessarabia and Northern Bukovina to the Soviet Union, Northern Transylvania to Hungary under the Second Vienna Award, and Southern Dobruja to Bulgaria under the Treaty of Craiova. Romania joined the Axis powers in 1940 and took part in the invasion of the Soviet Union, but following the Act of 23 August 1944 it switched sides to join the Allies. Romania regained Northern Transylvania in 1945, which the Paris Peace Treaties confirmed in 1947. Under Soviet occupation, King Michael I was forced to abdicate in December 1947, and Romania became a communist state, the Romanian People's Republic, and later a Warsaw Pact member. It was renamed the Socialist Republic of Romania in 1965. After the Romanian revolution of 1989 and the fall of communism, Romania began a transition to liberal democracy and a market economy.

Romania is a developed country with a high-income economy and one of the fastest growing economies in Europe, driven by a large industrial base, with significant automotive manufacturing, pharmaceutical, mining, energy and weapons industries, as well as a major information technology industry, with major cities serving as regional technology centres. It is also known for its internet infrastructure, which ranks among the fastest in the world. Romania is regarded as a middle power in international relations and is a member of the European Union, NATO, and the BSEC, among other international organisations.

== Etymology ==
The name Romania derives from the Romanian endonym român, itself from the Latin romanus, meaning citizen of Rome.

The earliest certain attestations of the endonym rumân/român appear in the accounts of 16th century Renaissance humanists, many of them envoys of the Holy See, who travelled through Wallachia, Moldavia and Transylvania.

The earliest known written attestation of the country's name is Neacșu's letter of 1521, the oldest surviving document in Romanian, which mentions Țeara Rumânească ("the Romanian Land", i.e. Wallachia). Chroniclers such as Miron Costin, Constantin Cantacuzino and Dimitrie Cantemir later stressed the Roman origin of the name and applied it to all three principalities inhabited by Romanians. The modern form România is documented from the 1810s.

Until the 19th century, the forms Rumânia and România coexisted, as did the endonyms rumân and român, with the u spelling predominating. In the 17th century the two forms diverged in meaning: rumân came to denote a serf, while român kept its ethnolinguistic sense. After serfdom was abolished in 1746, rumân gradually fell out of use and the spelling settled on român.

The modern exonyms in major European languages were formed from rumân in the late 18th century, such as French Roumanie, German Rumänien and the now-archaic English Rumania (also Roumania). In recent decades many languages, including English, Italian and Portuguese, have shifted to forms based on român, such as English Romania.

== History ==
=== Prehistory ===
Human remains found in Peștera cu Oase ("Cave with Bones"), radiocarbon date from circa 40,000 years ago, and represent the oldest known Homo sapiens in Europe. Neolithic agriculture spread after the arrival of a mixed group of people from Thessaly in the 6th millennium BC. Excavations at the Poiana Slatinei site near a salt spring next to Lunca, Neamț yielded the earliest evidence for salt exploitation in Europe; here salt production began between the 5th and 4th millennium BC. The first permanent settlements developed into "proto-cities", which were larger than 320 hectares (800 acres). The Cucuteni–Trypillia culture—the best known archaeological culture of Old Europe—flourished in Muntenia, southeastern Transylvania and northeastern Moldavia in the 3rd millennium BC. The first fortified settlements appeared around 1800 BC, showing the militant character of Bronze Age societies.

=== Antiquity ===
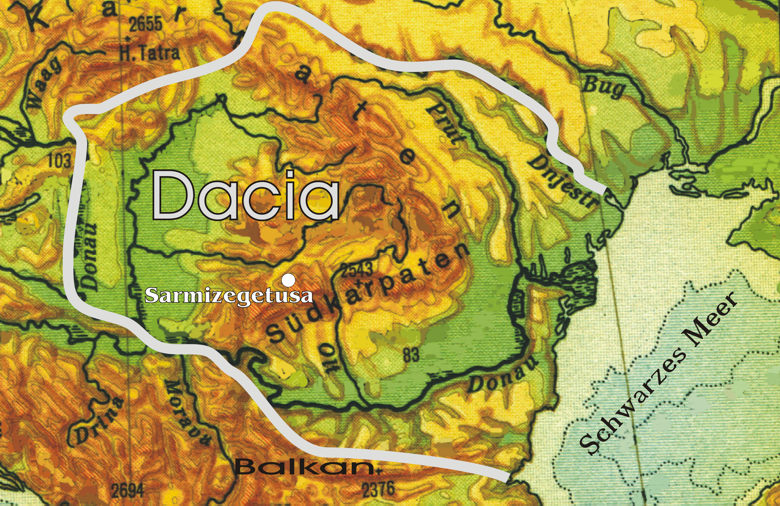
Maximum territorial extent of the Kingdom of Dacia during Burebista's reign (early 40s BC)

Greek colonies established on the Black Sea coast in the 7th century BC became important centres of commerce with the local tribes. Among the native peoples, Herodotus listed the Getae of the Lower Danube region, the Agathyrsi of Transylvania and the Syginnae of the plains along the river Tisza at the beginning of the 5th century BC. Centuries later, Strabo associated the Getae with the Dacians who dominated the lands along the southern Carpathian Mountains in the 1st century BC. Burebista was the first Dacian ruler to unite the local tribes. He also conquered the Greek colonies in Dobruja and the neighbouring peoples as far as the Middle Danube and the Balkan Mountains between around 55 and 44 BC. After Burebista was murdered in 44 BC, his kingdom collapsed.

The Romans reached Dacia during Burebista's reign and conquered Dobruja in 46 AD. Dacia was again united under Decebalus around 85 AD. He resisted the Romans for decades, but the Roman army defeated his troops in 106 AD. Emperor Trajan transformed Banat, Oltenia and the greater part of Transylvania into a new province called Roman Dacia, but Dacian, Germanic and Sarmatian tribes continued to dominate the lands along the Roman frontiers. The Romans pursued an organised colonisation policy, and the provincials enjoyed a long period of peace and prosperity in the 2nd century. Scholars accepting the Daco-Roman continuity theory—one of the main theories about the origin of the Romanians—say that the cohabitation of the native Dacians and the Roman colonists in Roman Dacia was the first phase of the Romanians' ethnogenesis. The Carpians, Goths and other neighbouring tribes made regular raids against Dacia from the 210s. The Romans could not resist, and Emperor Aurelian ordered the evacuation of the province Dacia Trajana in the 270s. Scholars supporting the continuity theory are convinced that most Latin-speaking commoners stayed behind when the army and civil administration was withdrawn. The Romans did not abandon their fortresses along the northern banks of the Lower Danube for decades, and Dobruja (known as Scythia Minor) remained an integral part of the Roman Empire until the early 7th century.

=== Middle Ages ===
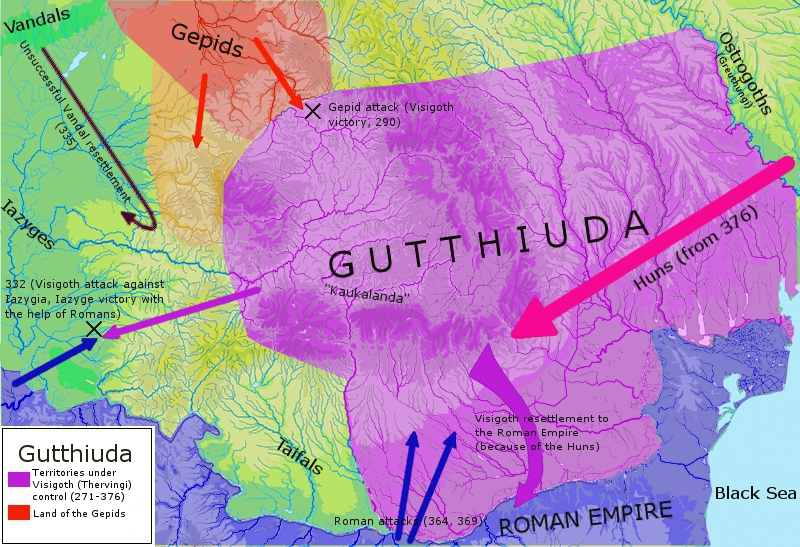
Gutthiuda, or the land of the Gothic-speaking Thervingi, and the neighbouring tribes (370s AD)

The Goths were expanding towards the Lower Danube from the 230s, forcing the native peoples to flee to the Roman Empire or to accept their suzerainty. The Goths' rule ended abruptly when the Huns invaded their territory in 376, causing new waves of migrations. The Huns forced the remnants of the local population into submission, but their empire collapsed in 454. The Gepids took possession of the former Dacia province. Place names that are of Slavic origin abound in Romania, indicating that a significant Slavic-speaking population lived in the territory. The first Slavic groups settled in Moldavia and Wallachia in the 6th century, in Transylvania around 600. The nomadic Avars defeated the Gepids and established a powerful empire around 570. The Bulgars, who also came from the European Pontic steppe, occupied the Lower Danube region in 680.

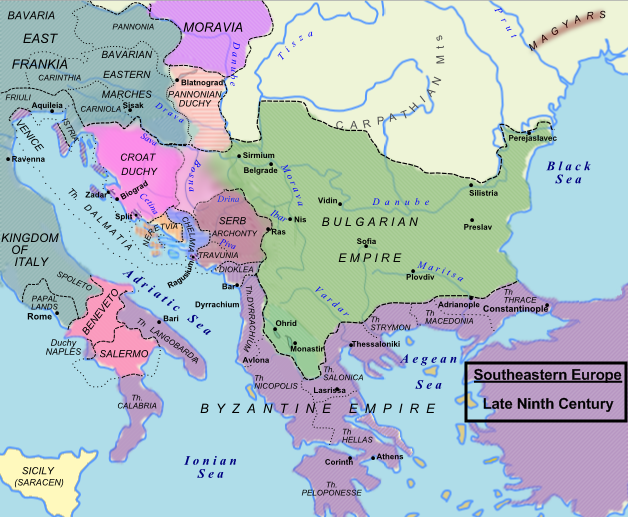
First Bulgarian Empire (681–1018) around 850

After the Avar Khaganate collapsed in the 790s, the First Bulgarian Empire became the dominant power of the region, occupying lands as far as the river Tisa. The First Bulgarian Empire had a mixed population consisting of the Bulgar conquerors, Slavs and Vlachs (or Romanians) but the Slavicisation of the Bulgar elite had already begun in the 9th century. Following the conquest of southern Transylvania around 830, people from the Bulgar Empire mined salt at the local salt mines. The Council of Preslav declared Old Church Slavonic the language of liturgy in the country in 893. The Vlachs also adopted Old Church Slavonic as their liturgical language.

The Magyars (or Hungarians) took control of the steppes north of the Lower Danube in the 830s, but the Bulgarians and the Pechenegs forced them to abandon this region for the lowlands along the Middle Danube around 894. Centuries later, the Gesta Hungarorum wrote of the invading Magyars' wars against three dukes—Glad, Menumorut and the Vlach Gelou—for Banat, Crișana and Transylvania. The Gesta also listed many peoples—Slavs, Bulgarians, Vlachs, Khazars, and Székelys—inhabiting the same regions. The reliability of the Gesta is debated. Some scholars regard it as a basically accurate account, others describe it as a literary work filled with invented details. The Pechenegs seized the lowlands abandoned by the Hungarians to the east of the Carpathians.

Byzantine missionaries proselytised in the lands east of the Tisa from the 940s and Byzantine troops occupied Dobruja in the 970s. The first king of Hungary, Stephen I, who supported Western European missionaries, defeated the local chieftains and established Roman Catholic bishoprics (office of a bishop) in Transylvania and Banat in the early 11th century. Significant Pecheneg groups fled to the Byzantine Empire in the 1040s; the Oghuz Turks followed them, and the nomadic Cumans became the dominant power of the steppes in the 1060s. Cooperation between the Cumans and the Vlachs against the Byzantine Empire is well documented from the end of the 11th century. Scholars who reject the Daco-Roman continuity theory say that the first Vlach groups left their Balkan homeland for the mountain pastures of the eastern and southern Carpathians in the 11th century, establishing the Romanians' presence in the lands to the north of the Lower Danube.

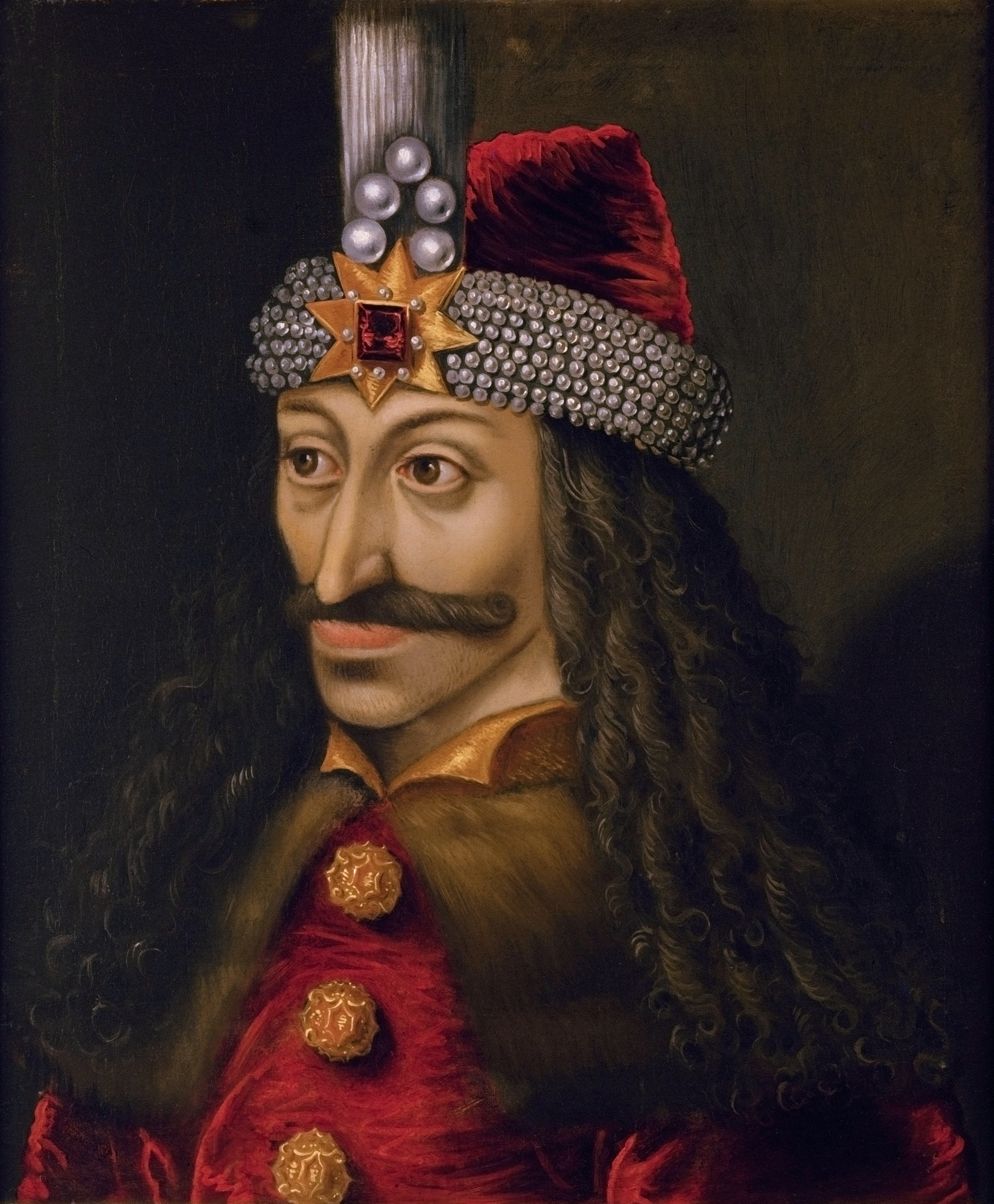
Vlad III of Wallachia (also known as Vlad the Impaler), medieval ruler of Wallachia

Exposed to nomadic incursions, Transylvania developed into an important border province of the Kingdom of Hungary. The Székelys—a community of free warriors—settled in central Transylvania around 1100 and moved to the easternmost regions around 1200. Colonists from the Holy Roman Empire—the Transylvanian Saxons' ancestors—came to the province in the 1150s. A high-ranking royal official, styled voivode, ruled the Transylvanian counties from the 1170s, but the Székely and Saxon seats (or districts) were not subject to the voivodes' authority. Royal charters wrote of the "Vlachs' land" in southern Transylvania in the early 13th century, indicating the existence of autonomous Romanian communities. Papal correspondence mentions the activities of Orthodox prelates among the Romanians in Muntenia in the 1230s. Also in the 13th century, the Republic of Genoa started establishing colonies on the Black Sea, including Calafat, and Constanța.

The Mongols destroyed large territories during their invasion of Eastern and Central Europe in 1241 and 1242. The Mongols' Golden Horde emerged as the dominant power of Eastern Europe, but Béla IV of Hungary's land grant to the Knights Hospitallers in Oltenia and Muntenia shows that the local Vlach rulers were subject to the king's authority in 1247. Basarab I of Wallachia united the Romanian polities between the southern Carpathians and the Lower Danube in the 1310s. He defeated the Hungarian royal army in the Battle of Posada and secured the independence of Wallachia in 1330. The second Romanian principality, Moldavia, achieved full autonomy during the reign of Bogdan I around 1360. A local dynasty ruled the Despotate of Dobruja in the second half of the 14th century, but the Ottoman Empire took possession of the territory after 1388.

Princes Mircea I and Vlad III of Wallachia, and Stephen III of Moldavia defended their countries' independence against the Ottomans. Most Wallachian and Moldavian princes paid a regular tribute to the Ottoman sultans from 1417 and 1456, respectively. John Hunyadi, organised the defence of the Kingdom of Hungary and anti-Ottoman campaigns from 1440 until his death in 1456. Increasing taxes outraged the Transylvanian peasants, and they rose up in an open rebellion in 1437, but the Hungarian nobles and the heads of the Saxon and Székely communities jointly suppressed their revolt. The formal alliance of the Hungarian, Saxon, and Székely leaders, known as the Union of the Three Nations, became an important element of the self-government of Transylvania. The Orthodox Romanian knezes ("chiefs") were excluded from the Union.

=== Early modern times and national awakening ===
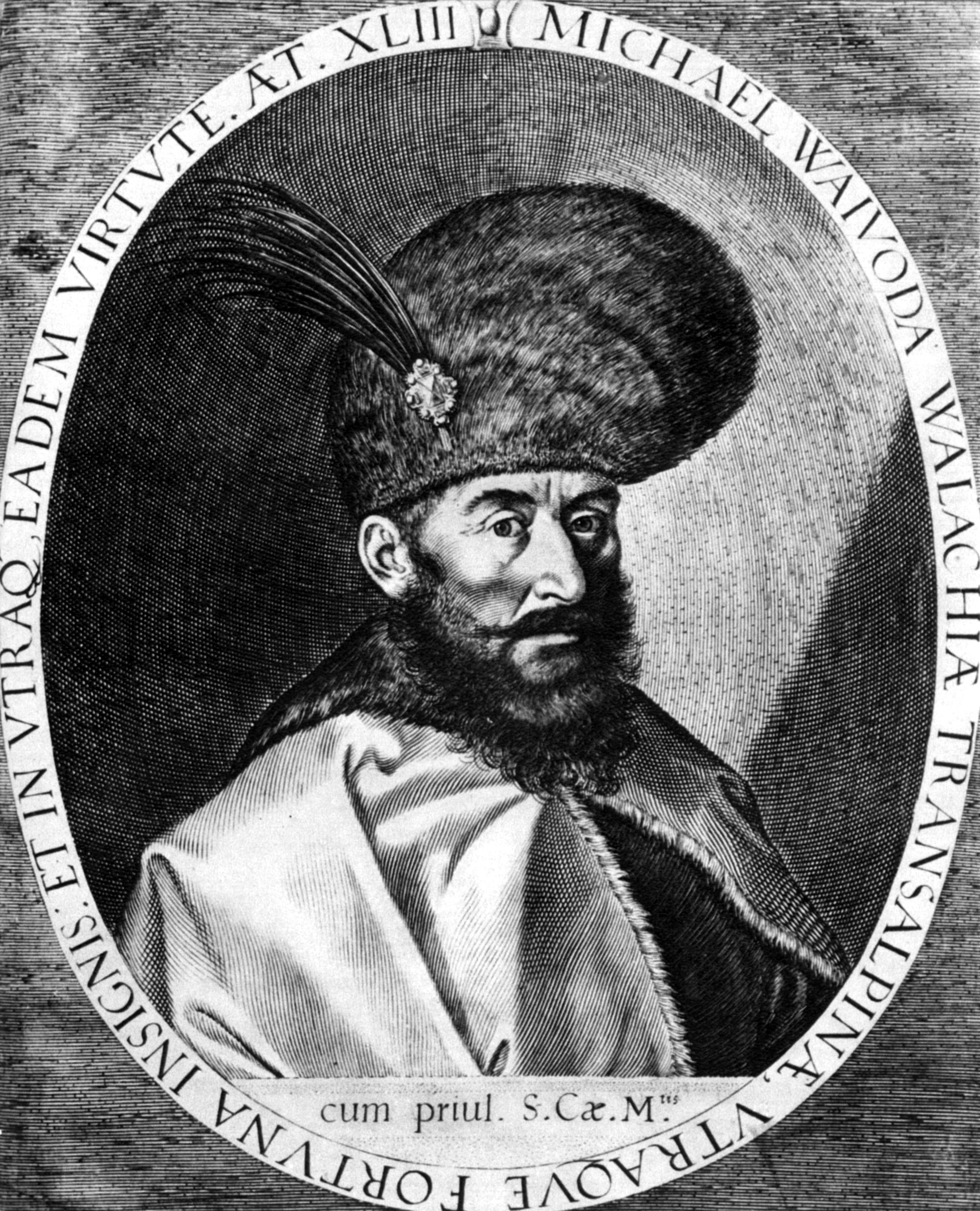
During the Long Turkish War, Wallachian Prince Michael the Brave (portrayed) briefly reigned over the three medieval principalities of Wallachia, Moldavia, and Transylvania, covering most of the present-day territory of Romania

The Kingdom of Hungary collapsed, and the Ottomans occupied parts of Banat and Crișana in 1541. Transylvania and Maramureș, along with the rest of Banat and Crișana, developed into a new state under Ottoman suzerainty, the Principality of Transylvania. The Reformation, initiated in Germany by Martin Luther in 1517, encouraged the spread of Protestantism across the region; by 1568, the Edict of Torda formally granted local communities the right to choose their own preachers, sanctioning the existence of four "received" religions (Catholicism, Lutheranism, Calvinism, and Unitarianism. The Romanians' Orthodox faith remained only tolerated, although they made up more than one-third of the population, according to 17th-century estimates. In June 1609, Gabriel Báthory freed the Romanian Orthodox clergy from both taxation and service demands.

The princes of Transylvania, Wallachia, and Moldavia joined the Holy League against the Ottoman Empire in 1594. The Wallachian prince, Michael the Brave, united the three principalities under his rule in May 1600. The neighbouring powers forced him to abdicate in September, but he became a symbol of the unification of the Romanian lands in the 19th century. Although the rulers of the three principalities continued to pay tribute to the Ottomans, the most talented princes—Gabriel Bethlen of Transylvania, Matei Basarab of Wallachia, and Vasile Lupu of Moldavia—strengthened their autonomy.

The united armies of the Holy League expelled the Ottoman troops from Central Europe between 1684 and 1699, and the Principality of Transylvania was integrated into the Habsburg monarchy. The Habsburgs supported the Catholic clergy and persuaded the Orthodox Romanian prelates to accept the union with the Roman Catholic Church in 1699. In the 18th century, Moldavia and Wallachia maintained their internal autonomy, but in 1711 and 1716, respectively, the period of the Phanariots began, with rulers appointed directly by the Porte from among the noble families of Greek origin in Constantinople. With the signing of the Ausgleich in 1867, Transylvania quickly lost its remaining political autonomy, being politically and administratively incorporated into the Kingdom of Hungary. The Church Union strengthened the Romanian intellectuals' devotion to their Roman heritage. The Orthodox Church was restored in Transylvania only after Orthodox monks stirred up revolts in 1744 and 1759. The organisation of the Transylvanian Military Frontier caused further disturbances, especially among the Székelys in 1764.

Princes Dimitrie Cantemir of Moldavia and Constantin Brâncoveanu of Wallachia concluded alliances with the Habsburg Monarchy and Russia against the Ottomans, but they were dethroned in 1711 and 1714, respectively. The sultans lost confidence in the native princes and appointed Orthodox merchants from the Phanar district of Istanbul to rule Moldavia and Wallachia. The Phanariot princes pursued oppressive fiscal policies and dissolved the army. The neighbouring powers took advantage of the situation: the Habsburg Monarchy annexed the northwestern part of Moldavia, or Bukovina, in 1775, and the Russian Empire seized the eastern half of Moldavia, or Bessarabia, in 1812.

A census revealed that the Romanians were more numerous than any other ethnic group in Transylvania in 1733, but legislation continued to use contemptuous adjectives (such as "tolerated" and "admitted") when referring to them. The Uniate bishop, Inocențiu Micu-Klein, who demanded recognition of the Romanians as the fourth privileged nation, was forced into exile. Uniate and Orthodox clerics and laymen jointly signed a plea for the Transylvanian Romanians' emancipation in 1791, but the monarch and the local authorities refused to grant their requests.

Animated map depicting the territorial changes of Romania from 1859 to 2010

The Treaty of Küçük Kaynarca authorised the Russian ambassador in Istanbul to defend the autonomy of Moldavia and Wallachia (known as the Danubian Principalities) in 1774. Taking advantage of the Greek War of Independence, a Wallachian lesser nobleman, Tudor Vladimirescu, stirred up a revolt against the Ottomans in January 1821, but he was murdered in June by Phanariot Greeks. After a new Russo-Turkish War, the Treaty of Adrianople strengthened the autonomy of the Danubian Principalities in 1829, although it also acknowledged the sultan's right to confirm the election of the princes.

Mihail Kogălniceanu, Nicolae Bălcescu and other leaders of the 1848 revolutions in Moldavia and Wallachia demanded the emancipation of the peasants and the union of the two principalities, but Russian and Ottoman troops crushed their revolt. The Wallachian revolutionaries were the first to adopt the blue, yellow and red tricolour as the national flag, which included the motto "Justice, Fraternity" (Dreptate, Frăție) to symbolise the bond between Wallachians and Moldavians. In Transylvania, most Romanians supported the imperial government against the Hungarian revolutionaries after the Diet passed a law concerning the union of Transylvania and Hungary. Bishop Andrei Șaguna proposed the unification of the Romanians of the Habsburg Monarchy in a separate duchy, but the central government refused to change the internal borders.

=== Unification and the Kingdom of Romania ===
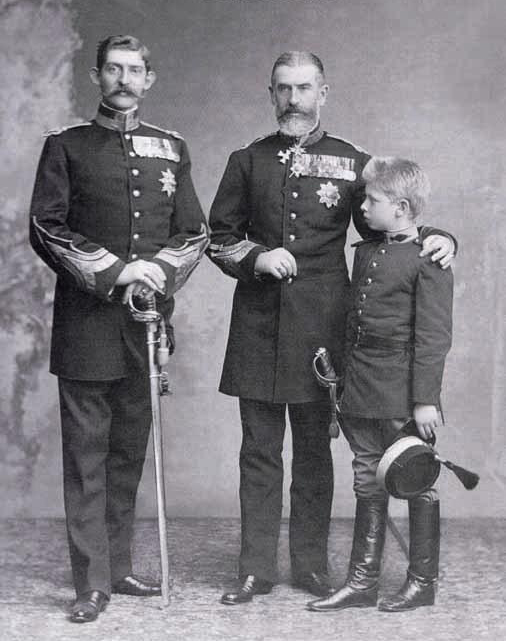
King Carol I with his nephew Ferdinand and his son, Carol II

==== From the Little Union to the Great War ====
The modern Romanian state was created through the unification of the principalities of Moldavia and Wallachia, accepted as a federative structure by the Great Powers following the Paris Convention of 1858, and later cemented by the simultaneous election as ruler of both states of the unionist Alexandru Ioan Cuza. After carrying out numerous reforms that laid the foundations for the modernisation of the state, he was forced in 1866 by a broad coalition of the political parties of the time, also known as the "Monstrous coalition", to abdicate and leave the country.

The union was at one time in peril, but the political leaders of the era succeeded in placing on the princely throne Carol I of Romania, who accepted the Constitution and took the oath on 10 May 1866. Eleven years later, on 10 May 1877, Romania proclaimed its independence—achieved on the battlefield—and in 1881, on the same day of the year, Carol was crowned as King of Romania. In 1913, Romania entered the Second Balkan War against Bulgaria, at the end of which it obtained Southern Dobruja. In 1914, King Carol I died, and his nephew, Ferdinand I, succeeded him on the throne.

==== World War I and the Great Union ====
In 1916, Romania entered World War I on the side of the Entente Powers. Although the Romanian forces did not perform well militarily, by the end of the war the Austrian and Russian Empires had disintegrated; the National Assembly in Transylvania, and the Sfatul Țării in Bessarabia and Bukovina proclaimed their union with Romania, and King Ferdinand I and Queen Maria were crowned sovereign of all Romanians in Alba Iulia on 15 October 1922.

After World War I, the union of Bukovina with Romania was ratified in 1919 by the Treaty of Saint Germain. Most of the territories claimed by Romania from the Kingdom of Hungary—Crișana, Transylvania and parts of Banat and Maramureș—were annexed to the Kingdom of Romania. This act was ratified in 1920 by the Treaty of Trianon, which defined the new border between Hungary and Romania.

==== Interwar period ====
After having left the country and renounced his claim to the throne in 1925, Carol II returned in 1930 and usurped his son's throne; influenced by his inner circle—referred to by historians as the "Royal Camarilla"—he gradually undermined the democratic system, and in 1938 he assumed dictatorial powers. Although he was pro-Western (especially Anglophile), Carol attempted to appease extreme centrifugal forces by appointing nationalist governments that adopted anti-Semitic measures, such as the Goga cabinet and the one led by the Orthodox Patriarch Miron Cristea.

==== World War II ====
Romania's territorial losses in the summer of 1940. Of these territories, only Northern Transylvania was regained after the end of World War II

Following the Molotov–Ribbentrop Pact of 1939, in June 1940 Romania accepted the loss of Bessarabia, Northern Bukovina and the Hertsa region in favour of the USSR (as stipulated in the Soviet ultimatum of 28 June 1940). Unaware of the details of the Soviet–German pact, Carol attempted to secure an alliance with Nazi Germany, and appointed Ion Gigurtu as President of the Council of Ministers, who declared that he would pursue a Nazi pro-Axis (Berlin–Rome) policy that was anti-Semitic and fascist-totalitarian in nature. Between 4 July and 4 September 1940, by accepting Hitler's arbitration over Transylvania (after Gigurtu declared on radio that Romania must make territorial sacrifices to justify its Nazi orientation and full adherence to the Berlin–Rome Axis), Romania ceded Northern Transylvania—including the city of Cluj—to Hungary. The vast territories in Transylvania ceded by Ion Gigurtu to Hungary contained important natural resources, including gold mines. Ion Gigurtu also initiated negotiations to cede 8,000 km^{2} of Southern Dobruja to Bulgaria, these negotiations were interrupted by Antonescu's unconditional acceptance of the territorial cession.

In response to the chaotic withdrawal from Bessarabia, the territorial cessions, public discontent, and protests from political leaders, King Carol II suspended the 1938 Constitution of Romania and appointed General Ion Antonescu as Prime Minister. This measure, supported by the Iron Guard, demanded that the king abdicate in favour of his son, Mihai. Subsequently, Antonescu assumed dictatorial powers and became President of the Council of Ministers, as the self-titled "Leader" of the state.

In 1941, as an ally of Nazi Germany, Romania entered World War II by declaring war on the Soviet Union. A shift in fortunes only became discernible after the defeat at Stalingrad and the subsequent change of the USSR from a defensive to an offensive posture. On 23 August 1944, with the Soviet army having been present in northern Moldova since March, King Mihai I forcibly removed Marshal Ion Antonescu from power, as he refused to sign an armistice with the Allies of World War II. Following Antonescu's outright refusal, King Mihai I ordered the dismissal and arrest of the marshal, and Romania switched sides to join the Allies.

=== Socialist Romania (1947–1989) ===
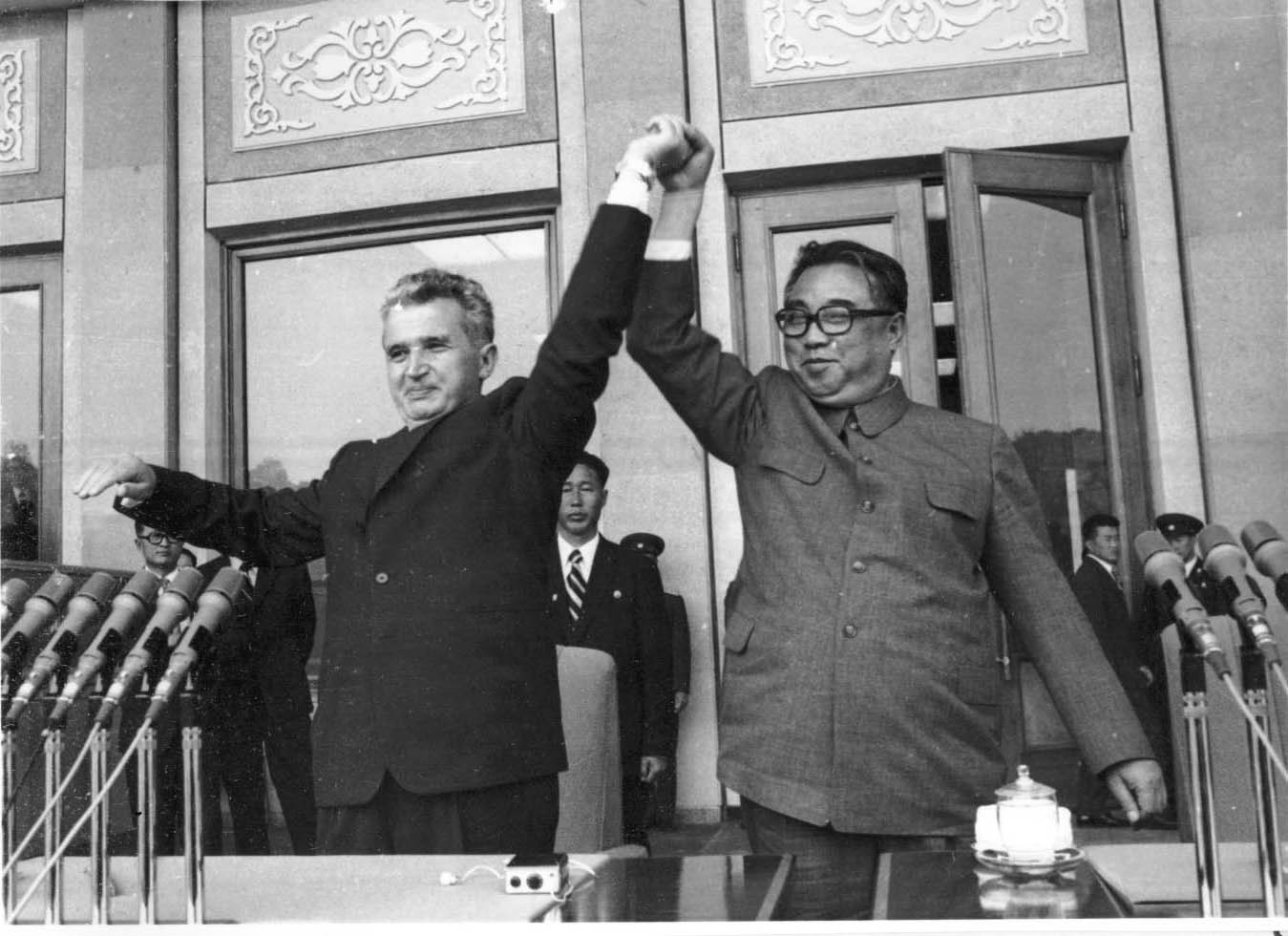
Nicolae Ceaușescu with Kim Il Sung of North Korea in 1978. In reforming the state, Ceaușescu sought to emulate Juche and Maoist ideas

Less than three years after the Soviet occupation of Romania, in 1947, King Michael I was forced to abdicate and the People's Republic of Romania—a state of "popular democracy"—was proclaimed. The newly established communist regime, led by the Romanian Workers' Party, consolidated its power through a Stalinist-type policy aimed at suppressing any political opposition and transforming the economic and social structures of the old bourgeois regime.

In the early 1960s, the Romanian government began asserting a certain degree of independence from the Soviet Union in its foreign policy, although it did not abandon its repressive policies (which it labelled "revolutionary conquests") in domestic affairs. In 1965, communist leader Gheorghe Gheorghiu-Dej died, ushering in a period of change in Romania. After a brief power struggle, Nicolae Ceaușescu emerged as the head of the communist party, becoming General Secretary of the Romanian Communist Party in 1965, President of the State Council in 1967, and President of the Socialist Republic of Romania in 1974. Ceaușescu's rule from 1965 to 1989 grew increasingly authoritarian during the 1980s.

=== Romania since 1989 ===
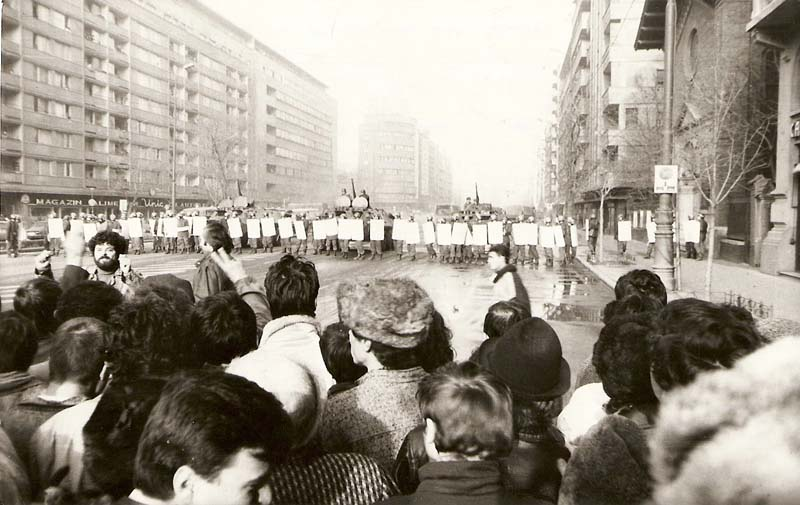
Tanks and Miliția on the Magheru Boulevard in Bucharest during the revolution

In the context of the fall of communism throughout Eastern Europe during the revolutions of 1989, a protest in support of Reformed pastor László Tőkés that began in December 1989 in Timișoara quickly escalated into a national uprising against the communist regime, ultimately resulting in the execution of Ceaușescu and his wife Elena on 25 December 1989.

An interim council composed of figures from civil society and former communist officials assumed control of the government, and Ion Iliescu became the provisional president of the country. The new government reversed many of the authoritarian communist policies and dismissed several leaders of the former regime, although still influenced by members of the former regime (the basis for the Golaniad, and Mineriads).

In May 1990, the first free elections in Romania since the 1937 elections were held, with Iliescu of the National Salvation Front winning the presidency with 85% of the vote. In 1992, he was reelected in the first election after the adoption of a permanent constitution via a referendum held the previous year. Illiescu lost the 1996 election to Emil Constantinescu, but returned to power in 2000. Traian Băsescu was elected president in 2004 and 2009, serving until 2014 at which point Klaus Iohannis succeeded him, being re-elected in 2019 and serving until 2025. During these years several events occurred. In 2009, the country was bailed out by the International Monetary Fund as result of the Great Recession in Europe following the 2008 financial crisis.

The post-1989 period has been characterised by the privatisation and closure of several former industrial and economic enterprises from the communist period, while corruption has been a major issue in contemporary politics.

A National Anticorruption Directorate was formed in the country in 2002. During the 2000s, Romania had one of the highest economic growth rates in Europe and has been referred at times as "the Tiger of Eastern Europe". This has been accompanied by a significant improvement in living standards as the country successfully reduced domestic poverty and established a functional democratic state. However, Romania's development suffered a major setback during the late 2000s' recession leading to a large gross domestic product contraction and a budget deficit in 2009. This led to Romania borrowing from the International Monetary Fund. Worsening economic conditions led to unrest and triggered a political crisis in 2012.

Since 2014, Romania launched an anti-corruption effort that led to the prosecution of medium- and high-level political, judicial and administrative offences by the National Anticorruption Directorate. In 2015, massive anti-corruption protests which developed in the wake of the Colectiv nightclub fire led to the resignation of prime minister Victor Ponta. During 2017–2019, in response to measures which were perceived to weaken the fight against corruption, some of the biggest post-1989 protests took place in Romania, with over 500,000 people protesting nationwide.

The 2021 Romanian political crisis led to the ousting of Florin Cîțu's incumbent government. The Ciucă Cabinet then took power, with Romania since having experienced a shift towards authoritarianism and illiberalism, as well as an increased corruption. Around this time, Romania was also hit by the COVID-19 pandemic. In the 2024 presidential election, Independent candidate Călin Georgescu achieved a surprise win in the first round. However, the Constitutional Court annulled the election results, citing Russian meddling. The cancellation led to far-right protests, criticism by the Trump administration, and Ilie Bolojan becoming acting president in February 2025 as Iohannis resigned to political pressure. In the subsequent 2025 Romanian presidential election, Bucharest Mayor Nicușor Dan was elected president.

== Geography ==
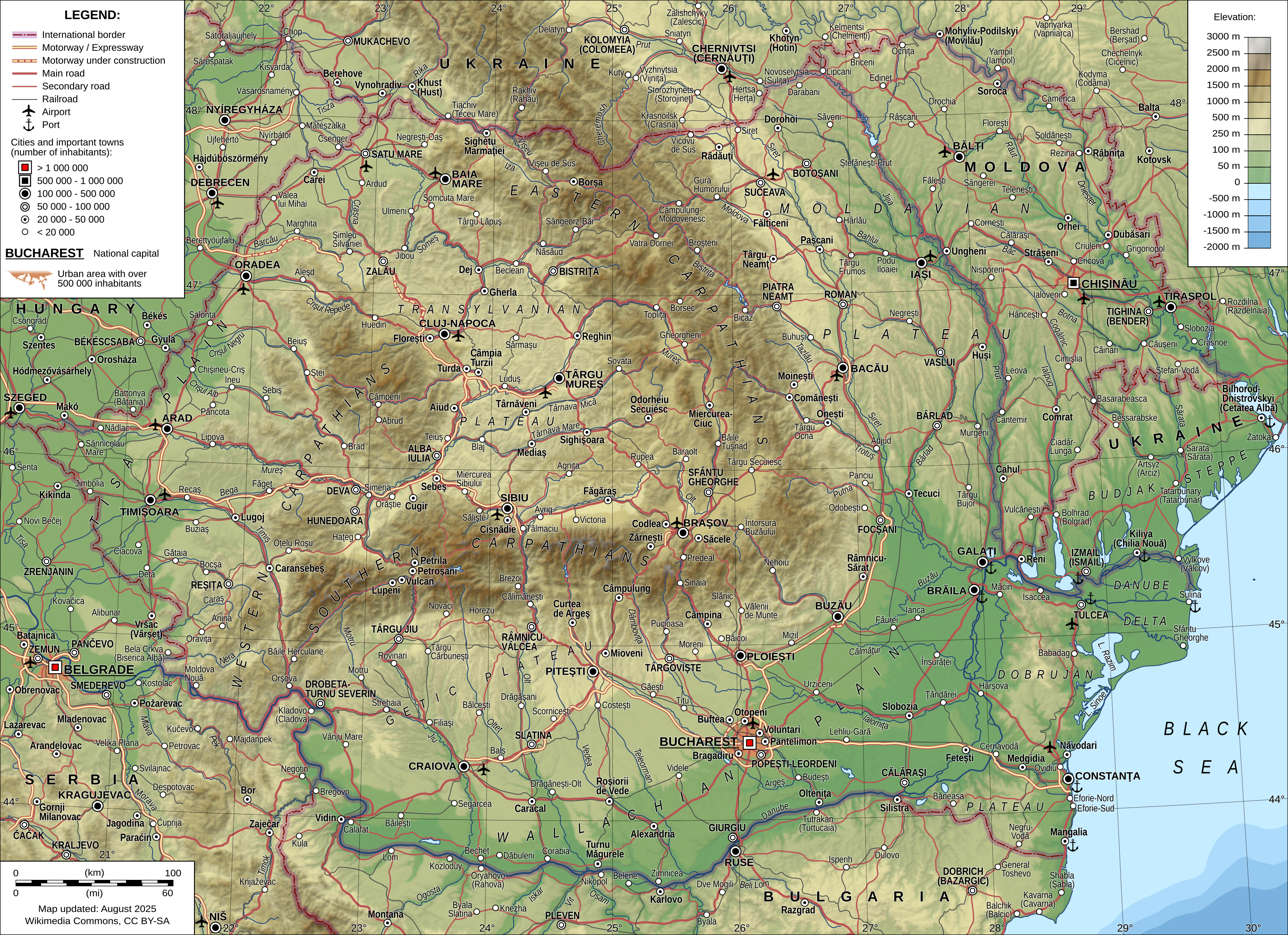
Topographic map of Romania

Romania is the largest country in Southeastern Europe and the twelfth-largest in Europe, having an area of 238,397 square kilometres (92,046 sq mi). It lies between latitudes 43° and 49° N and longitudes 20° and 30° E. The terrain is distributed roughly equally between mountains, hills, and plains. The Carpathian Mountains dominate the centre of Romania, with 14 mountain ranges reaching above 2,000 m or 6,600 ft—the highest is Moldoveanu Peak at 2,544 m or 8,346 ft. They are surrounded by the Moldavian and Transylvanian plateaus, the Pannonian Plain and the Wallachian plains.

Romania is home to six terrestrial ecoregions: Balkan mixed forests, Central European mixed forests, East European forest steppe, Pannonian mixed forests, Carpathian montane conifer forests, and Pontic steppe. Natural and semi-natural ecosystems cover about 47% of the country's land area. There are almost 10,000 km^{2} (3,900 sq mi) (about 5% of the total area) of protected areas in Romania covering 13 national parks and three biosphere reserves. The Danube river forms a large part of the border with Serbia and Bulgaria, and flows into the Black Sea, forming the Danube Delta, which is the second-largest and best-preserved delta in Europe, and a biosphere reserve and a biodiversity World Heritage Site. At 5,800 km^{2} (2,200 sq mi), the Danube Delta is the largest continuous marshland in Europe, and supports 1,688 different plant species alone.

Romania has one of the largest areas of undisturbed forest in Europe, covering almost 27% of its territory. The country had a 2019 Forest Landscape Integrity Index mean score of 5.95/10, ranking it 90th globally out of 172 countries. Some 3,700 plant species have been identified in the country, from which to date 23 have been declared natural monuments, 74 extinct, 39 endangered, 171 vulnerable, and 1,253 rare.

The fauna of Romania consists of 33,792 species of animals, 33,085 invertebrate and 707 vertebrate, with almost 400 unique species of mammals, birds, reptiles, and amphibians, including about 50% of Europe's (excluding Russia) brown bears and 20% of its wolves.

Romania is often seen by most as having the shape resembling one of a goldfish.

=== Climate ===
Romanian map of Köppen climate classification

Owing to its distance from open sea and its position on the southeastern portion of the European continent, Romania has a climate that is continental, with four distinct seasons. The average annual temperature is 11 °C (52 °F) in the south and 8 °C (46 °F) in the north. In summer, average maximum temperatures in Bucharest rise to 28 °C (82 °F), and temperatures over 35 °C (95 °F) are fairly common in the lower-lying areas of the country. In winter, the average maximum temperature is below 2 °C (36 °F). Precipitation is average, with over 750 mm (30 in) per year only on the highest western mountains, while around Bucharest it drops to approximately 570 mm (22 in). There are some regional differences: in western sections, such as Banat, the climate is milder and has some Mediterranean influences; the eastern part of the country has a more pronounced continental climate. In Dobruja, the Black Sea also exerts an influence over the region's climate.

== Politics ==
Romania is a national, sovereign, independent, unitary and indivisible state. Its form of government is a semi-presidential republic. The state is organised according to the principle of separation and balance of powers (legislative, executive and judicial) within a constitutional democracy. The president is elected by universal, equal, direct, secret and freely expressed vote. Following the 2003 amendments, the presidential term was extended from four to five years. The president appoints the prime minister, who in turn appoints the government. The head of state resides at Cotroceni Palace, while the prime minister and the government operate from Victoria Palace.

=== Government ===
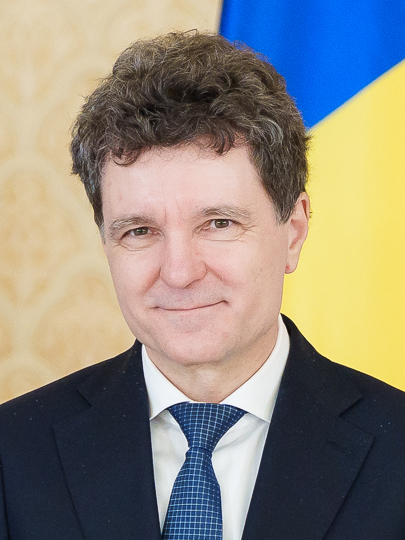
Nicușor Dan
President

Luca Niculescu
Prime Minister

The Parliament of Romania is bicameral, consisting of the Senate, and the Chamber of Deputies. Further seats in the Chamber of Deputies are reserved for representatives of national minorities. Parliament has the legislative role, debating and voting on ordinary and organic laws, both in specialised committees and in plenary session. Its members are elected by mixed single-member, universal, direct and secret ballot. The electoral system is proportional: members of parliament are elected from all parties that exceed the 5% electoral threshold of valid votes cast, according to an allocation algorithm. Elections are held every four years. The Palace of the Parliament has housed the Chamber of Deputies since 1994 and the Senate since 2004.

The Government of Romania is the public authority of the executive branch. It operates on the basis of a vote of confidence granted by Parliament, ensures the implementation of domestic and foreign policy, and exercises general leadership over the public administration. The government is appointed by the president on the basis of Parliament's vote of confidence. It consists of the prime minister and ministers. The prime minister heads the government and coordinates the activity of its members, in compliance with their legal powers. The government adopts decisions and, when authorised by Parliament, ordinances.

In accordance with the separation of powers, the judicial system is independent of the other branches of government and consists of a hierarchy of courts. Justice is administered only by the High Court of Cassation and Justice and the other courts: the courts of appeal, the ordinary and specialised tribunals, and the local courts (judecătorii). The High Court of Cassation and Justice is the highest court, and its fundamental role is to ensure the uniform interpretation and application of the law by the other courts. The Romanian judicial system is strongly influenced by the French model. The Constitutional Court of Romania is the sole authority of constitutional jurisdiction in the country, independent of any other public authority, and under the Constitution serves as the guarantor of its supremacy. The current Constitution, adopted in 1991, can be amended only by public referendum, and the last approved amendment referendum took place in 2003.

=== Administrative divisions ===
Romania is divided into 41 counties (județe) and the municipality of Bucharest. Each county is administered by a county council, responsible for local affairs, as well as a prefect responsible for the administration of national affairs at the county level. The prefect is appointed by the central government but cannot be a member of any political party. Each county is subdivided further into cities and communes, which have their own mayor and local council. There are a total of 320 cities and 2,861 communes in Romania. A total of 103 of the larger cities have municipality status, which gives them greater administrative power over local affairs. The municipality of Bucharest is a special case, as it enjoys a status on par to that of a county. It is further divided into six sectors and has a prefect, a general mayor (primar general), and a general city council.

The NUTS-3 (Nomenclature of Territorial Units for Statistics) level divisions of the EU reflect Romania's administrative-territorial structure and correspond to the 41 counties plus Bucharest. The cities and communes correspond to the NUTS-5 level divisions, but there are no current NUTS-4 level divisions. The NUTS-1 (four macroregions) and NUTS-2 (eight development regions) divisions exist but have no administrative capacity and are used instead for coordinating regional development projects and statistical purposes.

Development region	Area (km^{2})	Population (2021)	Most populous urban centre (Note: Together with its metropolitan area.)
Nord-Vest	34,152	2,521,793	Cluj-Napoca (411,379)
Centru	34,097	2,271,067	Brașov (369,896)
Nord-Est	36,853	3,226,436	Iași (382,484)
Sud-Est	35,774	2,367,987	Constanța (425,916)
Sud – Muntenia	34,469	2,864,339	Ploiești (276,279)
București - Ilfov	1,803	2,259,665	Bucharest (2,272,163)
Sud-Vest Oltenia	29,207	1,873,607	Craiova (356,544)
Vest	32,042	1,668,921	Timișoara (384,809)

=== Foreign relations ===
Diplomatic missions of Romania Countries where Romania operates at least one diplomatic mission (embassy, consulate, or representative office). Other sovereign states and territories with no Romanian diplomatic presence. Romania

Since December 1989, Romania has pursued a policy of strengthening relations with the West in general, more specifically with the United States and the EU, albeit with limited relations involving the Russian Federation. It joined NATO on 29 March 2004, the EU on 1 January 2007, while it joined the International Monetary Fund and the World Bank in 1972, and is a founding member of the World Trade Organization. Romania is recognised as a middle power for its military capabilities, as well as its active diplomatic engagement on the global stage.

Recent governments have stated that their goals include strengthening ties with and helping other countries (in particular Moldova, Ukraine, and Georgia) with better integration with the rest of the West. Romania has also made clear since the late 1990s that it supports NATO and EU membership for the democratic former Soviet republics in Eastern Europe and the Caucasus.

Romania applied to join to the Schengen Area in 2007, acquiring full membership in 2025 along with Bulgaria. In December 2005, President Traian Băsescu and United States Secretary of State Condoleezza Rice signed an agreement that would allow a U.S. military presence at several Romanian facilities primarily in the eastern part of the country. In 2009, US Secretary of State Hillary Clinton referred to Romania as "one of the most trustworthy and respectable US allies". However, by 2025, relations had worsened, with US vice president JD Vance in February scolding "flimsy suspicions" and "enormous pressure from its continental neighbours" for causing the annulment of the 2024 Romanian presidential election in which Călin Georgescu won the first round.

Relations with Moldova are a special case given that the two countries share the same language and a common history. A movement for unification of Moldova and Romania appeared in the early 1990s after both countries achieved emancipation from communist rule but lost ground in the mid-1990s when a new Moldovan government pursued an agenda towards preserving a Moldovan republic independent of Romania. After the 2009 protests in Moldova and the subsequent removal of Communists from power, relations between the two countries have improved considerably.

=== Military ===
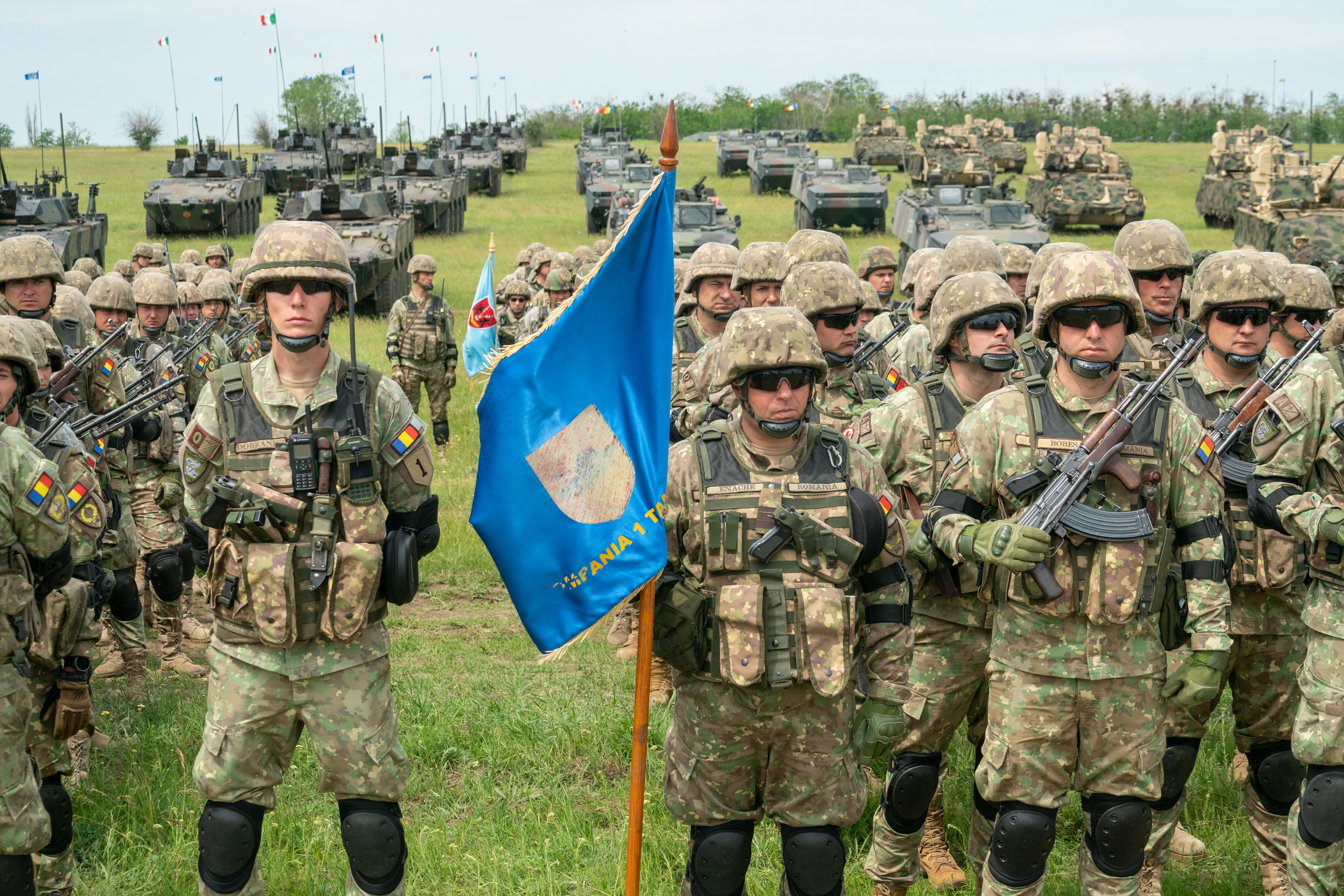
Romanian soldiers at the Saber Guardian 23 exercise opening ceremony in Smârdan, Galați

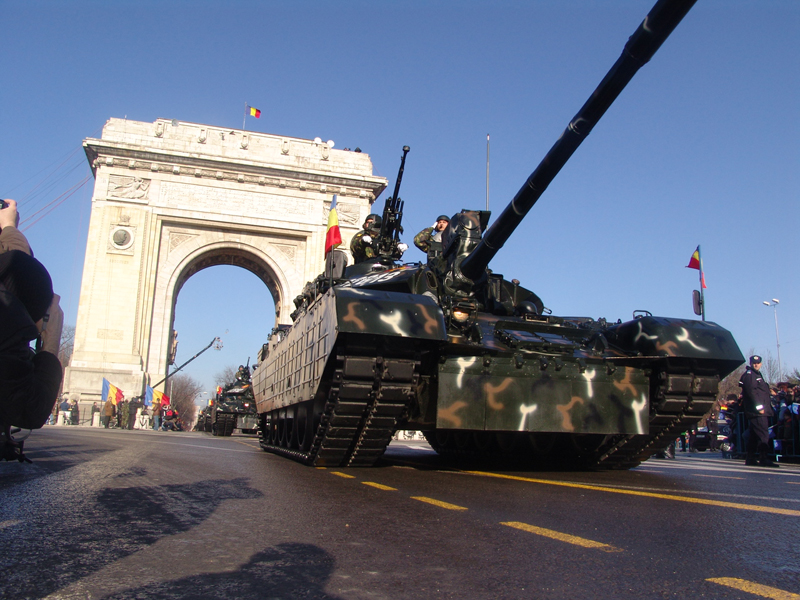
An TR-85 M1 tank at the 2007 Romanian military parade for national day, with the Arch of Triumph in the background

The Romanian Armed Forces consist of land, air, and naval forces led by a Commander-in-chief under the supervision of the Ministry of National Defence, and by the president as the Supreme Commander during wartime. The Armed Forces consist of approximately 55,000 reservists and 71,500 active military personnel—35,800 for land, 10,700 for air, 6,600 for naval forces, and 16,500 in other fields. Total defence spending in 2023 accounted for 2.44% of total national GDP, or approximately US$8.48 billion, with a total of $9 billion intended to be spent until 2026 for modernisation and acquisition of new equipment. Conscription stopped in 2007, when Romania switched to a volunteer army.

The Air Force operates F-16AM/BM MLU fighters, C-27J Spartan and C-130 Hercules transport aircraft, as well as IAR 330 and IAR 316 helicopters. A procurement programme for F-35 fifth-generation fighters is also currently being carried out. The Naval Forces operate three frigates, of which two are Type 22 frigates acquired from the British Royal Navy, as well as four corvettes. The River Flotilla operates Mihail Kogălniceanu and Smârdan-class river monitors.

Romania contributed troops to the international coalition in Afghanistan beginning in 2002, with a peak deployment of 1,600 troops in 2010 (which was the 4th largest contribution according to the US). Its combat mission in the country concluded in 2014. Romanian troops participated in the occupation of Iraq, reaching a peak of 730 soldiers before being slowly drawn down to 350 soldiers. Romania terminated its mission in Iraq and withdrew its last troops on 24 July 2009, among the last countries to do so. The frigate the Regele Ferdinand participated in the 2011 military intervention in Libya.

In December 2011, the Romanian Senate unanimously adopted the draft law ratifying the Romania-United States agreement signed in September of the same year that would allow the establishment and operation of a US land-based ballistic missile defence system in Romania as part of NATO's efforts to build a continental missile shield. The Aegis Ashore missile system based at Deveslu became operational in 2016.

In 2024, construction work started on expanding the Mihail Kogălniceanu Air Base (RoAF 57th Air Base). The air base is set to become the largest NATO base in Europe after the implementation of a project spanning 20 years.

== Economy ==
In 2024, Romania had a GDP (PPP) of around $894 billion and a GDP per capita (PPP) of $47,203. According to the World Bank, Romania is a high-income economy. According to Eurostat, Romania's GDP per capita (PPS) was 77% of the EU average (100%) in 2022, an increase from 44% in 2007 (the year of Romania's accession to the EU), making Romania one of the fastest growing economies in the EU.

The Bucharest Stock Exchange (BVB) is the stock exchange of Romania, located in Bucharest. In 2024, the BVB boasted a $74 billion market capitalisation and a trading volume of $7.2 billion. As of 2024, 86 companies were listed on the exchange. In September 2020, FTSE Russell upgraded the BVB from a Frontier market to a Secondary Emerging Market.

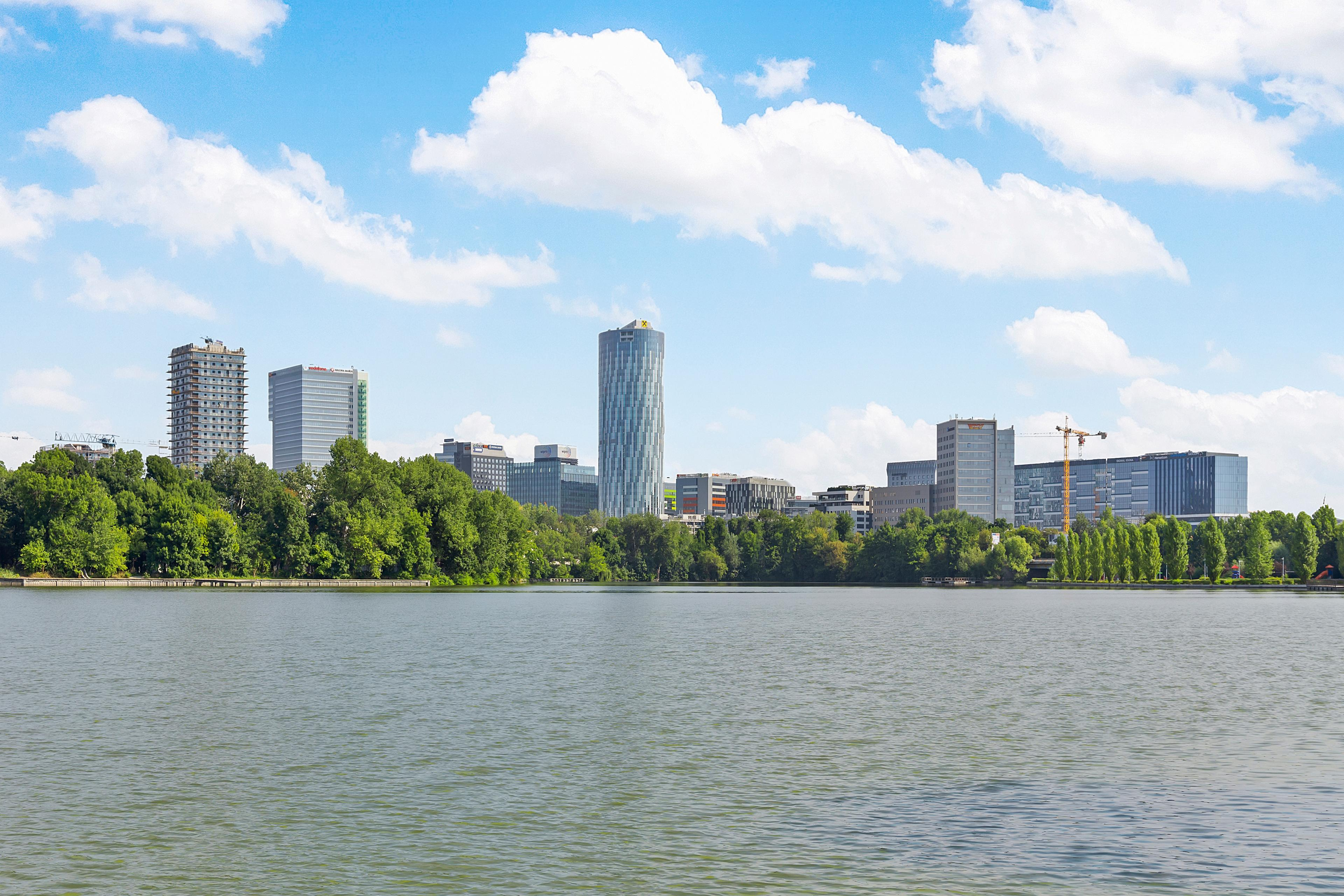
Floreasca business district, as seen from Lake Herăstrău

After 1989 the country experienced a decade of economic instability and decline, led in part by an obsolete industrial base and a lack of structural reform. From 2000 onwards, however, the Romanian economy was transformed into one of relative macroeconomic stability, characterised by high growth, low unemployment and declining inflation. In 2006, according to the Romanian Statistics Office, GDP growth in real terms was recorded at 7.7%, one of the highest rates in Europe. However, the Great Recession forced the government to borrow externally, including an IMF €20 billion bailout programme. According to The World Bank, GDP per capita in purchasing power parity grew from $13,703 in 2007 to $47,903 in 2023.

Romania's main exports are vehicles, software, clothing and textiles, industrial machinery, electrical and electronic equipment, metallurgic products, raw materials, military equipment, pharmaceuticals, fine chemicals, and agricultural products (fruits, vegetables, and flowers). Trade is mostly centred on the member states of the EU, with Germany, Italy and France being the country's single largest trading partners.

In 2005, the government replaced Romania's progressive tax system with a flat tax of 16% for both personal income and corporate profit, among the lowest rates in the EU. The economy is based predominantly on services, which account for 56.2% of the country's total GDP as of 2017, with industry and agriculture accounting for 30% and 4.4% respectively. Approximately 25.8% of the Romanian workforce is employed in agriculture, one of the highest rates in Europe.

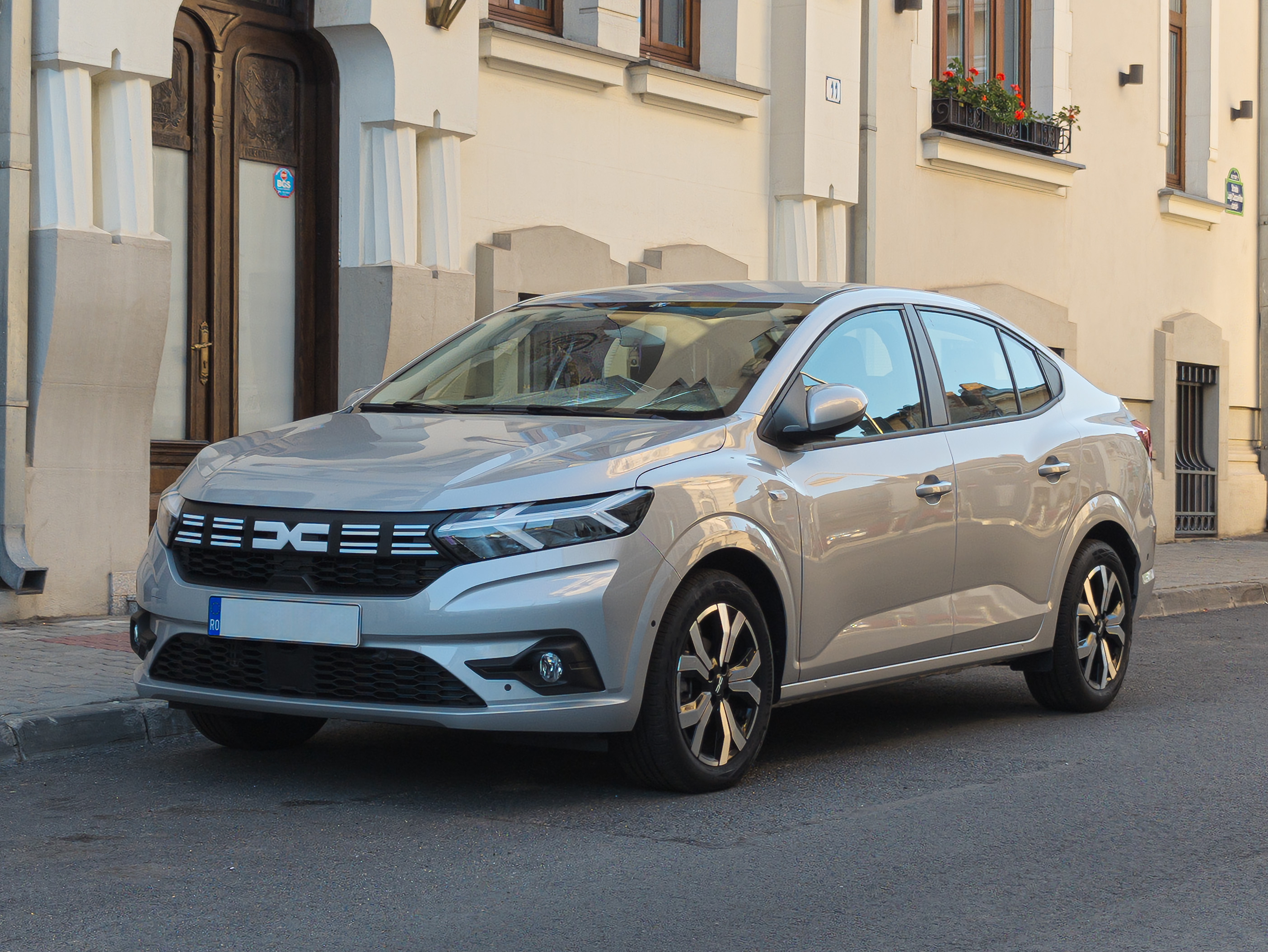
Romania is home to automobile company Dacia

Romania has attracted increasing amounts of foreign investment following the end of communism, with the stock of foreign direct investment (FDI) in Romania rising to €83.8 billion in June 2019. Romania's FDI outward stock (an external or foreign business either investing in or purchasing the stock of a local economy) amounted to $745 million in December 2018, the lowest value among the 28 EU member states.

Since 1867 the official currency has been the Romanian leu ("lion"), which "was redenominated, with the exchange rate set at 1 new leu = 10,000 old lei" in 2005 according to the National Bank of Romania. As it joined the EU in 2007, Romania plans to adopt the euro in 2029.

=== Infrastructure ===
Romania's road network

Graph depicting Romania's electricity supply mix as of 2015

According to the Romania's National Institute of Statistics (INS), Romania's total road network was estimated in 2015 at 86,080 kilometres (53,488 mi). The World Bank estimates the railway network at 22,298 kilometres (13,855 mi) of track, the fourth-largest railway network in Europe. Romania's rail transport experienced a dramatic decline after 1989 and was estimated at 99 million passenger journeys in 2004, but has experienced a recent (2013) revival due to infrastructure improvements and partial privatisation of lines, accounting for 45% of all passenger and freight movements in the country. Bucharest Metro, the only underground railway system, was opened in 1979 and measures 80.01 km (49.72 mi) with an average ridership in 2021 of 720,000 passengers during the workweek in the country. There are sixteen international commercial airports in service today. Over 12.8 million passengers flew through Bucharest's Henri Coandă International Airport in 2017.

Romania is a net exporter of electrical energy and is 52nd worldwide in terms of consumption of electric energy. Around a third of the produced energy comes from renewable sources, mostly as hydroelectric power. It has one of the largest refining capacities in Eastern Europe, even though oil and natural gas production has been decreasing for more than a decade. With one of the largest reserves of crude oil and shale gas in Europe it is among the most energy-independent countries in the EU, and is looking to expand its nuclear power plant at Cernavodă further.

There were almost 18.3 million connections to the Internet in June 2014. According to Bloomberg, in 2013 Romania ranked fifth in the world, and according to The Independent, it ranks number one in Europe at Internet speeds, with Timișoara ranked among the highest in the world.

=== Tourism ===
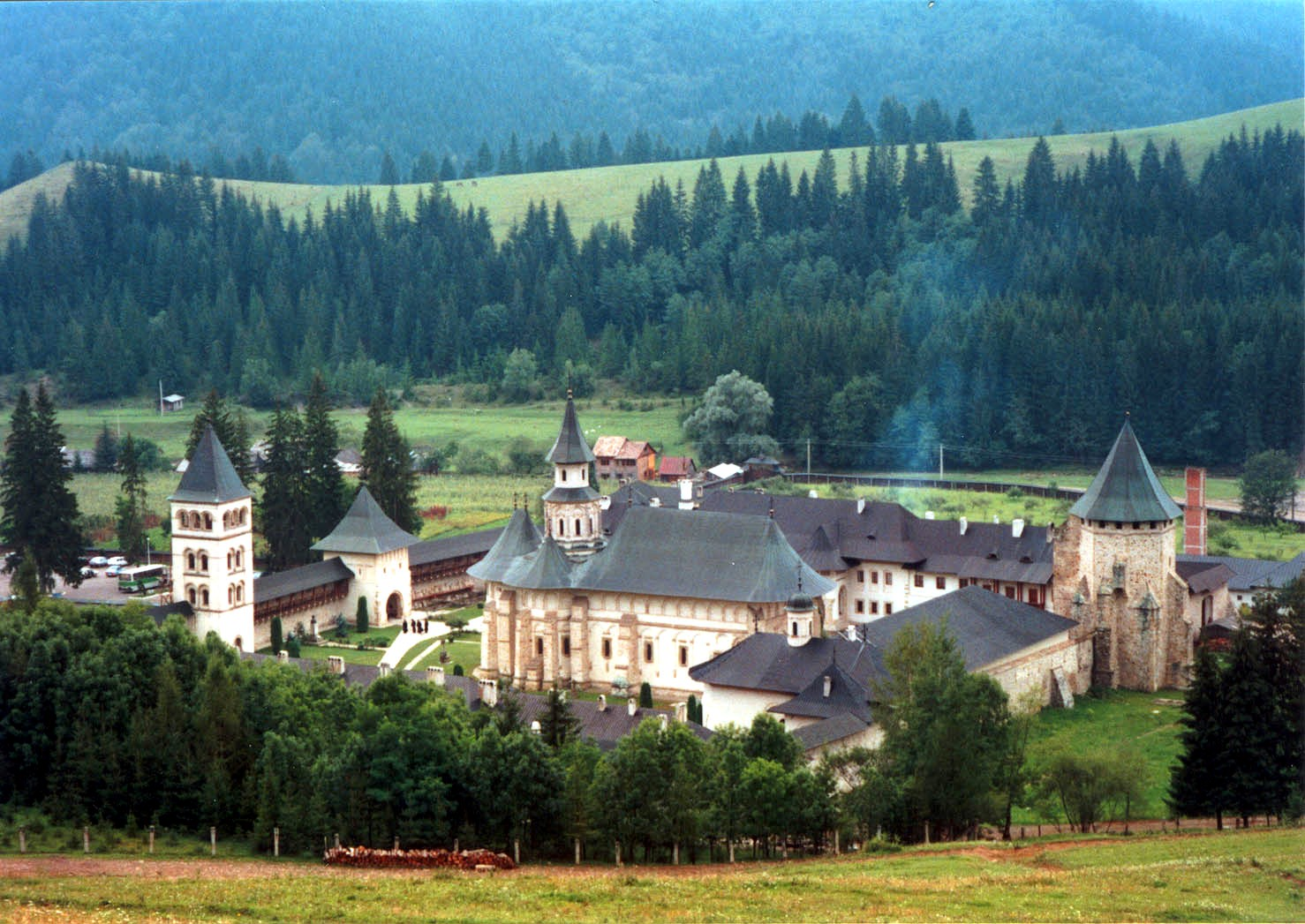
Putna Monastery in Bukovina, one of the medieval churches of Moldavia

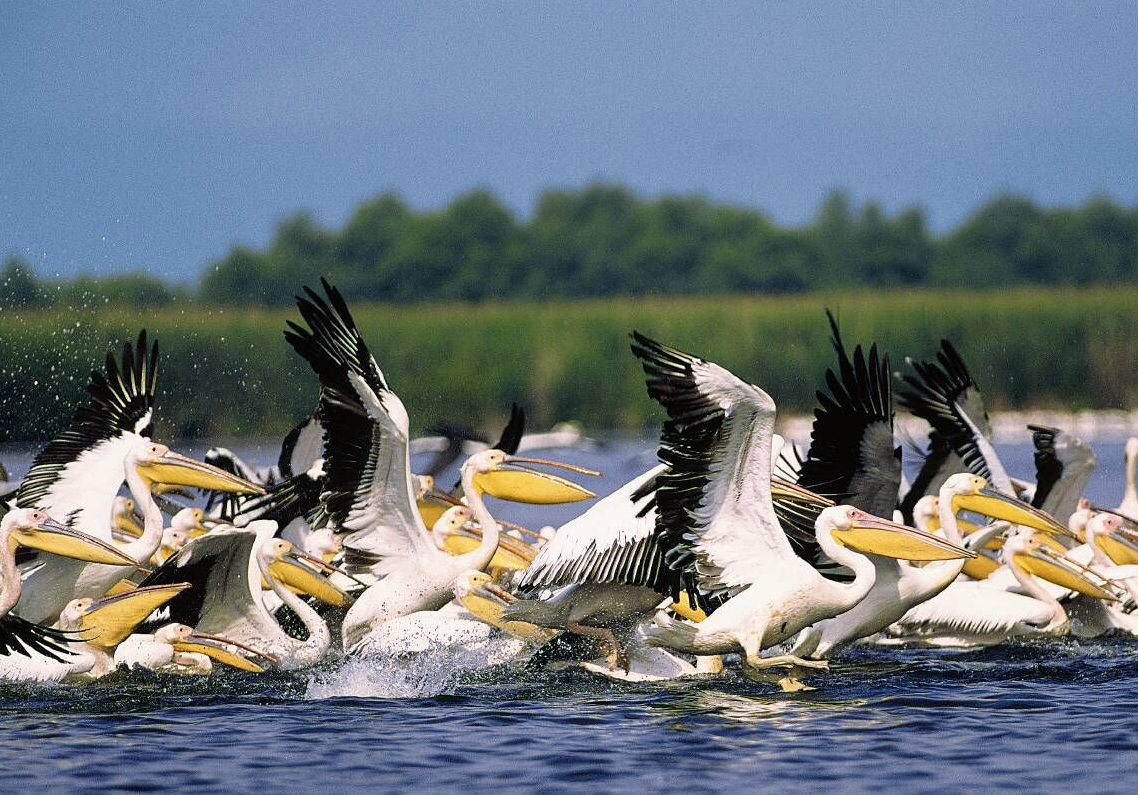
The Danube Delta with its wildlife

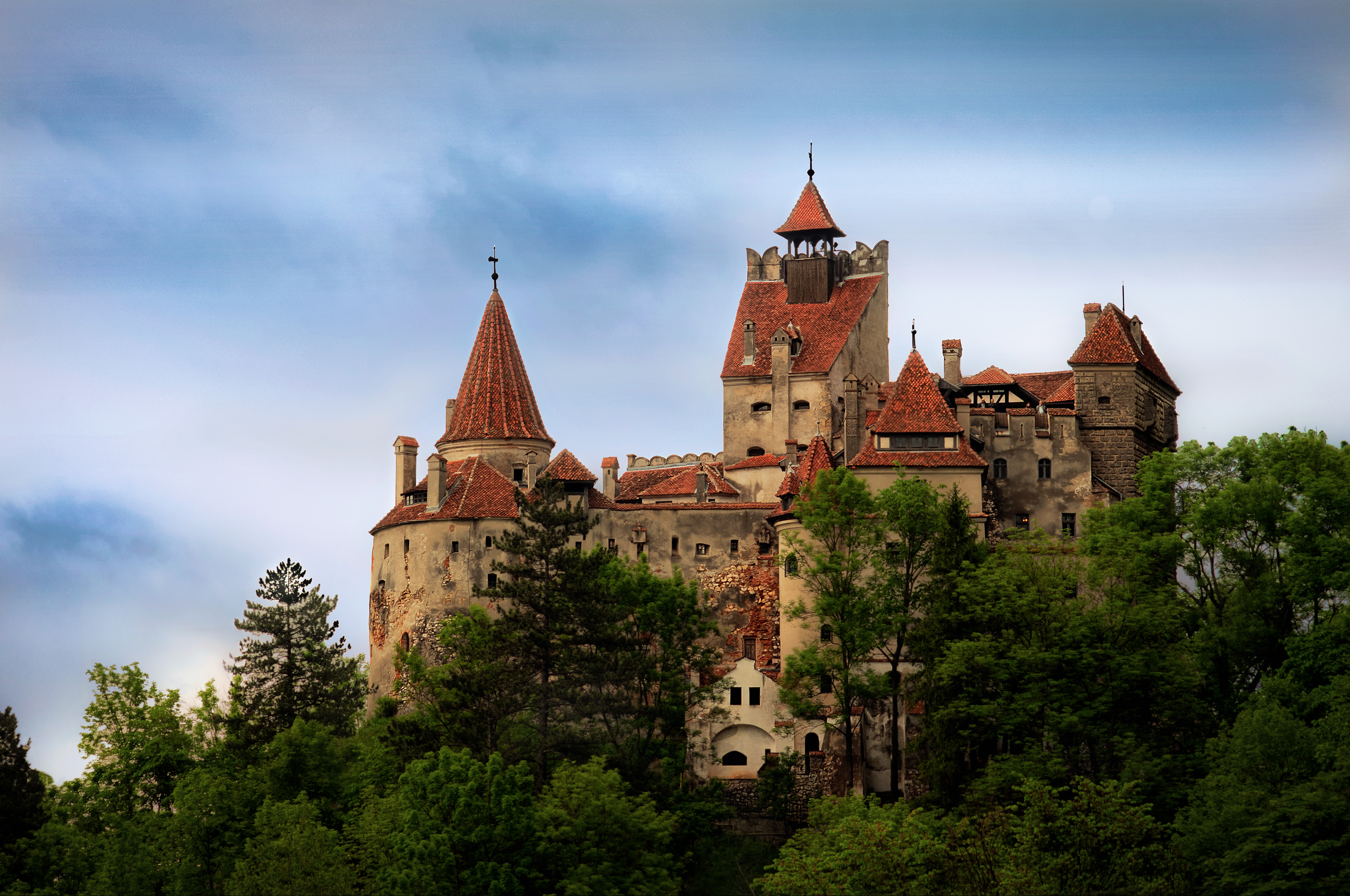
Bran Castle

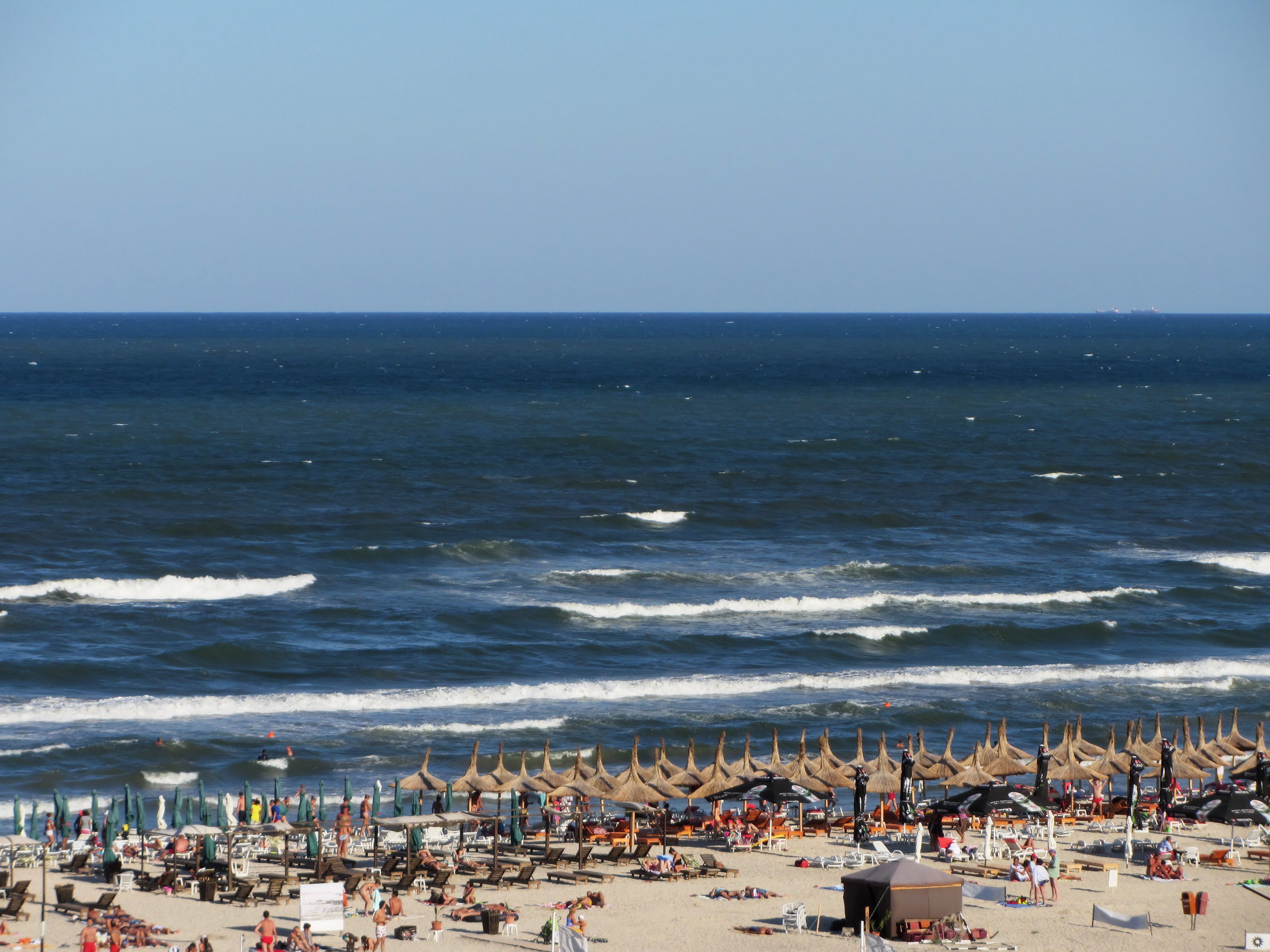
Mamaia Black Sea resort

Tourism is a significant contributor to the Romanian economy, generating around 5% of GDP. The number of tourists has been rising steadily, reaching 9.33 million foreign tourists in 2016, according to the Worldbank. Tourism in Romania attracted €400 million in investments in 2005. More than 60% of the foreign visitors in 2007 were from other EU countries. The popular summer attractions of Mamaia and other Black Sea Resorts attracted 1.3 million tourists in 2009.

Among Romania's spa towns and resorts are Buziaș, Băile Călacea, Moneasa, Băile Lipova, Călimănești, Amara, and Geoagiu-Băi. At the same time, seaside resorts such as Eforie, Mangalia, Saturn, Venus, Neptun, Olimp, and Mamaia (sometimes also called the Romanian Riviera) are among the main tourist attractions during the summer. Most popular skiing resorts are along the Valea Prahovei, Muntele Mic, Semenic, Straja and Poiana Brașov. Wine tourism is represented by areas such as Recaș, Silagiu, Odobești, Drăgășani, and Podgoria Aradului.

Castles, fortifications, or strongholds as well as preserved medieval Transylvanian cities or towns such as Timișoara, Cluj-Napoca, Sibiu, Brașov, Alba Iulia, Baia Mare, Bistrița, Mediaș, Cisnădie, Sebeș, or Sighișoara also attract a large number of tourists. Bran Castle, near Brașov, is one of the most famous attractions in Romania, drawing hundreds of thousands of tourists every year as it is often (falsely) advertised as being Dracula's Castle. Other attractions include the Danube Delta or the Sculptural Ensemble of Constantin Brâncuși at Târgu Jiu.

Rural tourism, focusing on getting visitors acquainted with local folklore and customs, has become an important alternative, and is targeted to promote such sites as Bran and its Dracula's Castle, the painted churches of northern Moldavia, and the wooden churches of Maramureș, or the villages with fortified churches in Transylvania. The Via Transilvanica long-distance hiking and cycling trail, which crosses 10 counties in the Transylvania, Banat and Bukovina regions of the country further promotes rural slow tourism. Other important itineraries include Via Mariae, EuroVelo 6 and 13, etc.

In 2014, Romania had 32,500 companies active in the hotel and restaurant industry, with a total turnover of €2.6 billion. More than 1.9 million foreign tourists visited Romania in 2014, 12% more than in 2013. According to the country's National Statistics Institute, some 77% came from Europe (particularly from Germany, Italy, and France), 12% from Asia, and less than 7% from North America.

=== Science and technology ===
Historically, Romanian researchers and inventors have made notable contributions to several fields. In the history of flight, Traian Vuia built the first aeroplane to take off under its own power and Aurel Vlaicu built and flew some of the earliest successful aircraft, while Henri Coandă discovered the Coandă effect of fluidics. Victor Babeș discovered more than 50 types of bacteria; biologist Nicolae Paulescu developed an extract of the pancreas and showed that it lowers blood sugar in diabetic dogs, thus being significant in the history of insulin; while Emil Palade received the Nobel Prize for his contributions to cell biology. Lazăr Edeleanu was the first chemist to synthesise amphetamine, and he also invented the procedure of separating valuable petroleum components with selective solvents.

During the 1990s and 2000s, the development of research was hampered by several factors, including corruption, low funding, and a considerable brain drain. In recent years, Romania has ranked the lowest or second-lowest in the EU by research and development spending as a percentage of GDP, standing at roughly 0.5% in 2016 and 2017, substantially below the EU average of just over 2%. The country joined the European Space Agency (ESA) in 2011, and CERN in 2016. In 2018, however, Romania lost its voting rights in the ESA due to a failure to pay €56.8 million in membership contributions to the agency.

In the early 2010s, the situation for science in Romania was characterised as "rapidly improving" albeit from a low base. In January 2011, Parliament passed a law that enforces "strict quality control on universities and introduces tough rules for funding evaluation and peer review". Romania was ranked 49th in the Global Innovation Index in 2025.

The nuclear physics facility of the EU's proposed Extreme Light Infrastructure (ELI) laser will be built in Romania. In early 2012, Romania launched its first satellite from the Centre Spatial Guyanais in French Guiana. Starting in December 2014, Romania became a co-owner of the International Space Station.

== Demographics ==
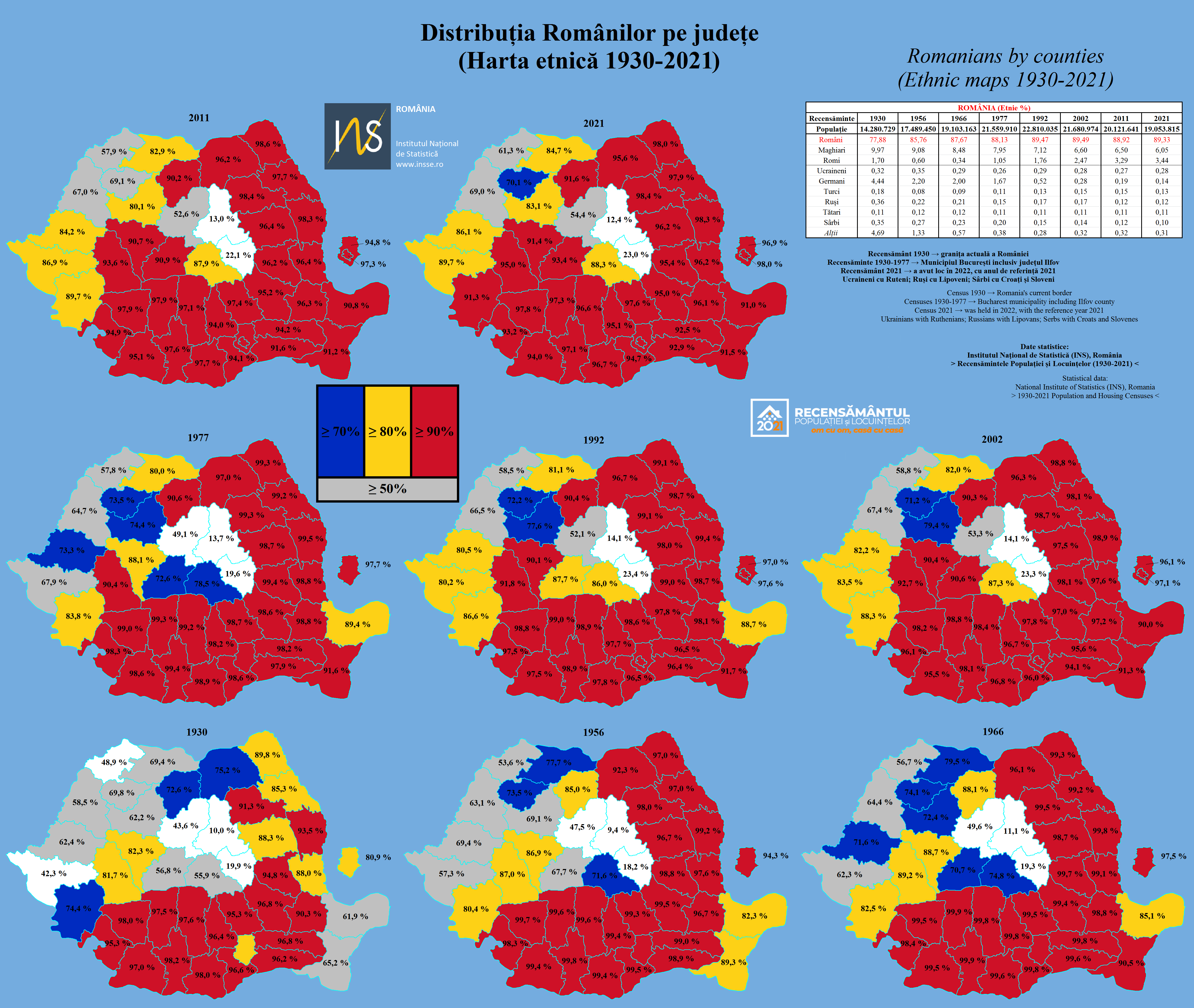
Romanians by counties (Ethnic maps 1930–2021)

According to the 2021 Romanian census, Romania's population was 19,053,815. Like other countries in the region, its population is expected to decline gradually as a result of sub-replacement fertility rates and negative net migration rate. According to the 2021 Romanian census, Romanians made up 89.33% of the population, Hungarians 6.05% and the Roma 3.44% of the population, but many ethnicities are not recorded, as they do not have ID cards. International sources give higher figures for Roma than the official census. According to the Council of Europe, the Roma make up 8.32% of the population; this figure is difficult to verify due to the mobility of Roma and the reluctance of some of them to disclose their ethnicity. Hungarians constitute a majority in the counties of Harghita and Covasna. Other minorities include Ukrainians, Germans, Turks, Lipovans, Aromanians, Tatars, and Serbs. In 1930, there were 745,421 Germans living in Romania, but only about 36,000 remained in the country to this day. As of 2009, there were also approximately 133,000 immigrants living in Romania, primarily from Moldova and China.

The total fertility rate (TFR) in 2018 was estimated at 1.36 children born per woman, which is below the replacement rate of 2.1, and one of the lowest in the world; it remains considerably below the high of 5.82 children born per woman in 1912. In 2014, 31.2% of births were to unmarried women. The birth rate (9.49‰, 2012) is much lower than the mortality rate (11.84‰, 2012), resulting in a shrinking (−0.26% per year, 2012) and aging population (median age: 41.6 years, 2018), one of the oldest populations in the world, with approximately 16.8% of total population aged 65 years and over. The life expectancy in 2015 was estimated at 74.92 years (71.46 years male, 78.59 years female). The number of Romanians and individuals with ancestors born in Romania living abroad is estimated at 12 million. After the Romanian Revolution of 1989, a significant number of Romanians emigrated to other European countries, North America or Australia. For example, in 1990, 96,919 Romanians permanently settled abroad.

=== Urbanisation ===
Although 54.0% of the population lived in urban areas in 2011, this percentage has been declining since 1996. Counties with over 2/3 urban population are Hunedoara, Brașov and Constanța, while those with less than a third are Dâmbovița (30.06%) and Giurgiu and Teleorman. Bucharest is the capital and the largest city in Romania, with a population of over 1.7 million in 2021. Its larger urban zone has a population of almost 2.2 million, which are planned to be included into a metropolitan area up to 20 times the area of the city proper.

Another 17 cities have a population of over 100,000, with Cluj-Napoca, Iași, Constanța and Timișoara having more than 250,000 inhabitants, and Craiova, Brașov and Galați with over 200,000 inhabitants. Metropolitan areas have been constituted for most of these cities.

Largest cities in Romania 2021 Census
Rank	Name	County	Pop.	Rank	Name	County	Pop.
1	Bucharest	Bucharest	1,716,961	11	Brăila	Brăila	154,686
2	Cluj-Napoca	Cluj	286,598	12	Arad	Arad	145,078
3	Iași	Iași	271,692	13	Pitești	Argeș	141,275
4	Constanța	Constanța	263,688	14	Bacău	Bacău	136,087
5	Timișoara	Timiș	250,849	15	Sibiu	Sibiu	134,309
6	Brașov	Brașov	237,589	16	Târgu Mureș	Mureș	116,033
7	Craiova	Dolj	234,140	17	Baia Mare	Maramureș	108,759
8	Galați	Galați	217,851	18	Buzău	Buzău	103,481
9	Oradea	Bihor	183,105	19	Râmnicu Vâlcea	Vâlcea	93,151
10	Ploiești	Prahova	180,540	20	Satu Mare	Satu Mare	91,520

=== Languages ===
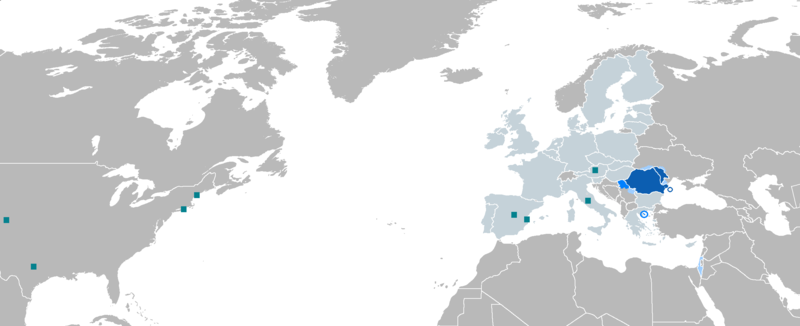
Map highlighting the use of the Romanian language worldwide, both as a native and as a foreign language

The official language is Romanian, a Romance language (the most widely spoken of the Eastern Romance branch), which presents a consistent degree of similarity to Aromanian, Megleno-Romanian, and Istro-Romanian, but shares many features equally with the rest of the Western Romance languages, specifically Italian, French, Spanish, Portuguese, and Catalan. The Romanian alphabet contains the same 26 letters of the standard Latin alphabet, as well as five additional ones (namely ă, â, î, ț, and ș), totalling 31.

Romanian is spoken as a first language by 91.55% of the entire population, while Hungarian and Vlax Romani are spoken by 6.28% and 1.20% of the population, respectively. There are also 40,861 native speakers of Ukrainian (concentrated in some compact regions near the border, where they form local majorities), 17,101 native speakers of Turkish, 15,943 native speakers of German, and 14,414 native speakers of Russian living in Romania.

According to the Constitution, local councils ensure linguistic rights to all minorities. In localities with ethnic minorities of over 20%, that minority's language can be used in the public administration, justice system, and education. Foreign citizens and stateless persons who live in Romania have access to justice and education in their own language. English and French are the main foreign languages taught in schools. In 2010, the Organisation internationale de la Francophonie identified 4,756,100 French speakers in the country. According to the 2012 Eurobarometer, English is spoken by 31% of Romanians, French is spoken by 17%, and Italian and German, each by 7%.

=== Religion ===
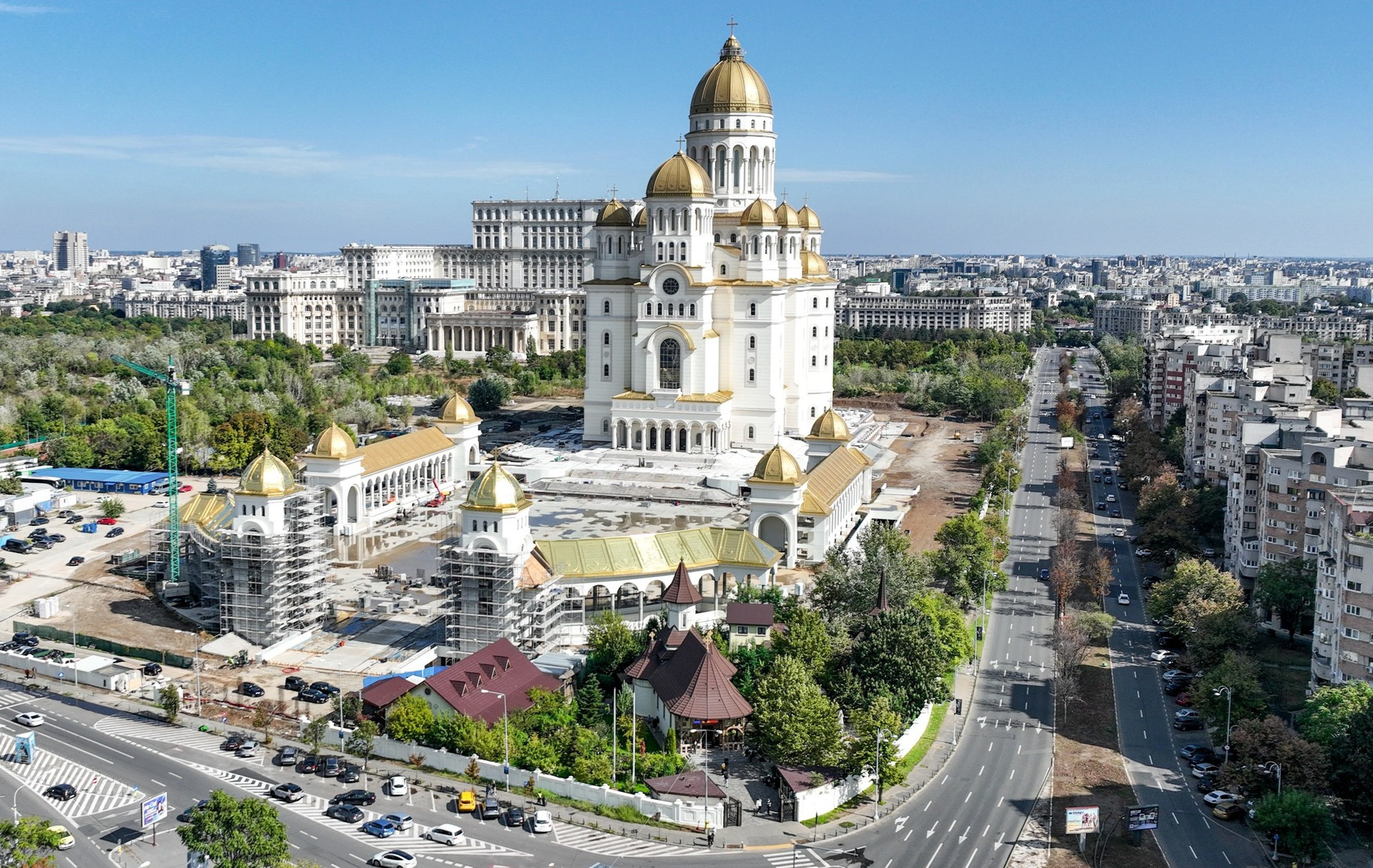
The People's Salvation Cathedral in Bucharest is the tallest and largest Eastern Orthodox church building (Note: Saint Isaac's Cathedral in Saint Petersburg although larger in gross area (7,000 m^{2} the building including colonnades and 7,600 m^{2} with stairway), has a smaller area excluding colonnades (5,000 m^{2}). Since 1931 it has been converted into a Russian state museum.) in the world

Romania is a secular state and has no state religion. An overwhelming majority of the population identify themselves as Christians. At the country's 2021 census, 73.60% of respondents identified as Orthodox Christians, with 73.42% belonging to the Romanian Orthodox Church. Other denominations include Protestantism (6.22%), Roman Catholicism (3.89%), and Greek Catholicism (0.61%). From the remaining population 128,291 people belong to other Christian denominations or have another religion, which includes 58,347 Muslims (mostly of Turkish and Tatar ethnicity) and 2,708 Jewish (Jews once constituted 4% of the Romanian population—728,115 persons in the 1930 census). Additionally, 71,430 people are irreligious, 57,229 are atheist, 25,485 are agnostic, and 2,658,165 people chose to not declare their religion.

The Romanian Orthodox Church is an autocephalous Eastern Orthodox Church in full communion with other Orthodox churches, with a Patriarch as its leader. It is the third-largest Eastern Orthodox Church in the world, and unlike other Orthodox churches, it functions within a Latin culture and uses a Romance liturgical language. Its canonical jurisdiction covers the territories of Romania and Moldova. Romania has the world's third-largest Eastern Orthodox population.

=== Education ===
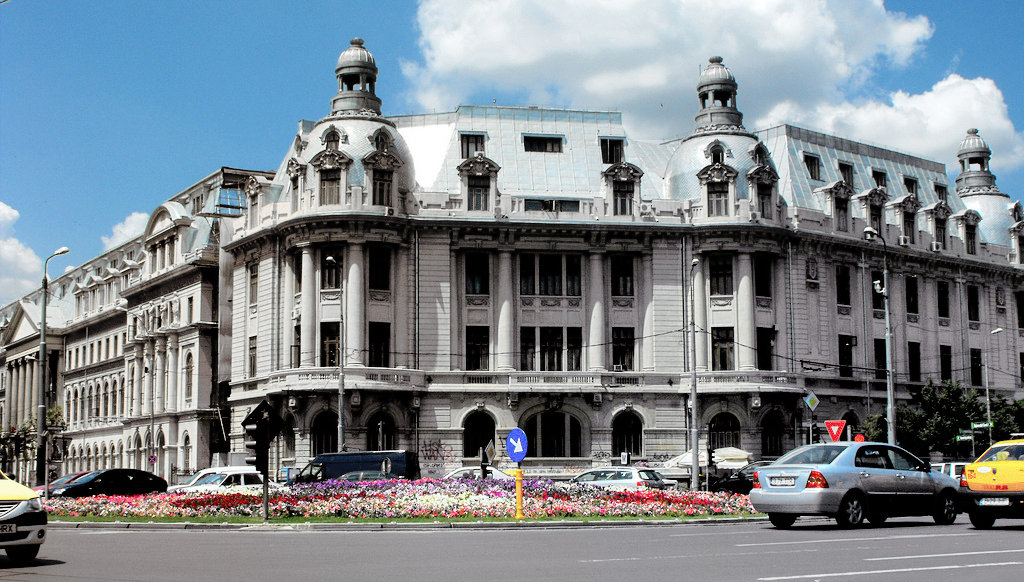
The University of Bucharest was opened in 1864.

Since the Romanian revolution of 1989, the Romanian educational system has been in a continuous process of reform that has received mixed criticism. In 2004, some 4.4 million individuals were enrolled in school. Of these, 650,000 were in kindergarten (three-six years), 3.11 million in primary and secondary level, and 650,000 in tertiary level (universities). In 2018, the adult literacy rate was 98.8%. Kindergarten is optional between three and five years. Since 2020, compulsory schooling starts at age 5 with the last year of kindergarten (grupa mare) and is compulsory until twelfth grade. Primary and secondary education is divided into 12 or 13 grades. There is also a semi-legal, informal private tutoring system used mostly during secondary school, which prospered during the Communist regime.

As of 2025, Babeș-Bolyai University of Cluj-Napoca and the University of Bucharest are included in the QS World University Rankings' top 800.

Romania ranks fifth in the all-time medal count at the International Mathematical Olympiad with 316 total medals, dating back to 1959. Ciprian Manolescu managed to write a perfect paper (42 points) for a gold medal more times than anybody else in the history of the competition, in 1995, 1996 and 1997. Romania has achieved the highest team score in the competition, after China, Russia, the United States and Hungary. Romania also ranks sixth in the all-time medal count at the International Olympiad in Informatics with 107 total medals, dating back to 1989.

=== Health ===
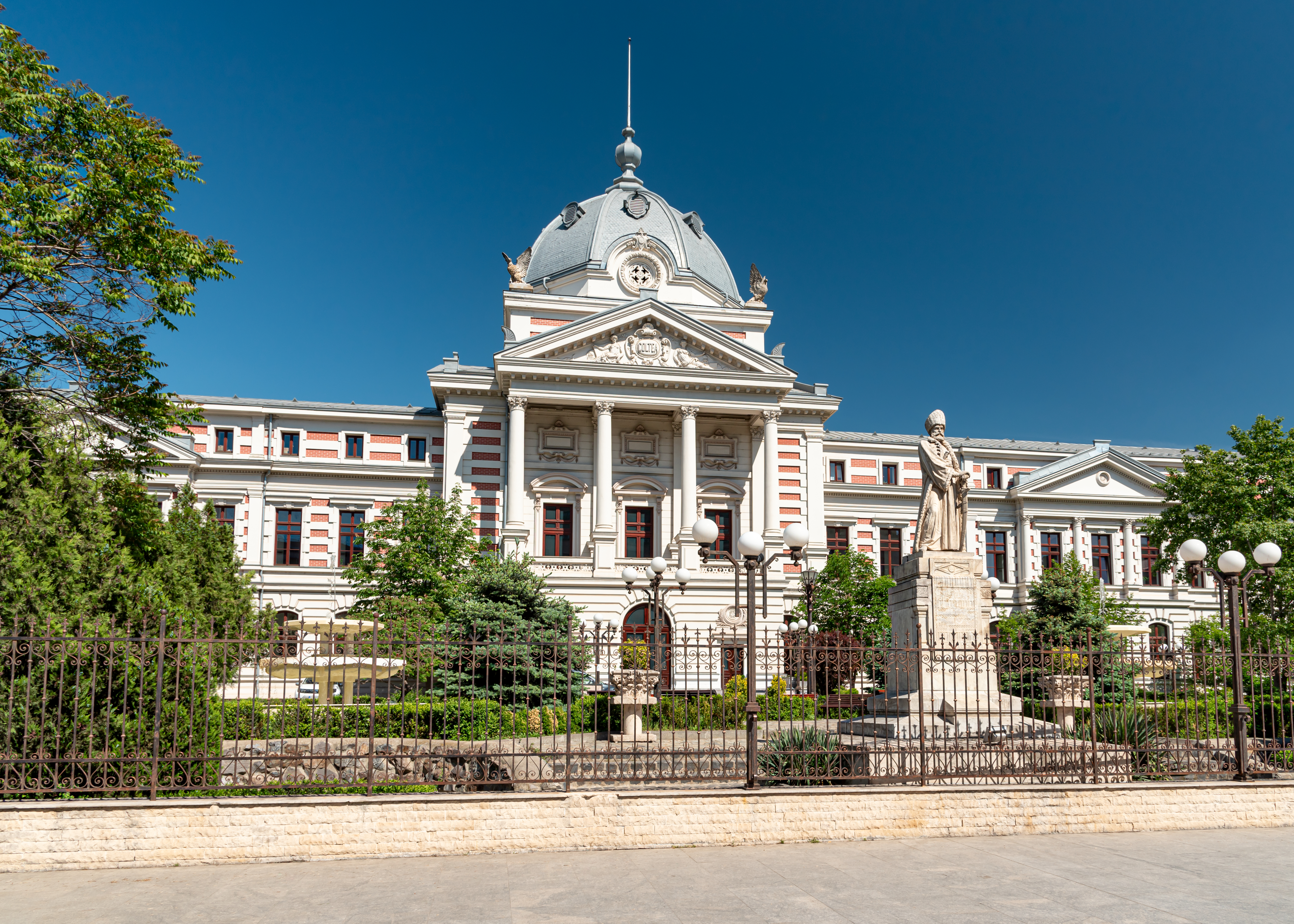
The Colțea Hospital in Bucharest completed a $90 million renovation in 2011

Healthcare in Romania is mainly provided by the public sector, which runs most hospitals and offers national health insurance to nearly all citizens. In 2021, healthcare costs were US$16. 7 billion, or US$2,385 per person, making up €5.69 of GDP. Government spending is higher than in markets like Bulgaria but lower than Hungary. Spending is expected to rise by 7. US$5 billion (+37. 68%) from 2024 to 2028, reaching 27. US$3 billion by 2028.

The Romanian National Institute of Statistics reports over 65,000 health units in Romania, with 53,000 in urban areas and 12,000 in rural areas. There are 543 hospitals, including 488 in urban and 55 in rural areas, along with 160 other hospital-like establishments. Nearly 50% of these are large facilities with over 100 beds, while 39% are small with fewer than 50 beds. The total number of inpatient beds is 135,085, allocated mainly to psychiatry, surgery, and internal medicine among other specialties.

== Culture ==
=== Holidays and traditions ===
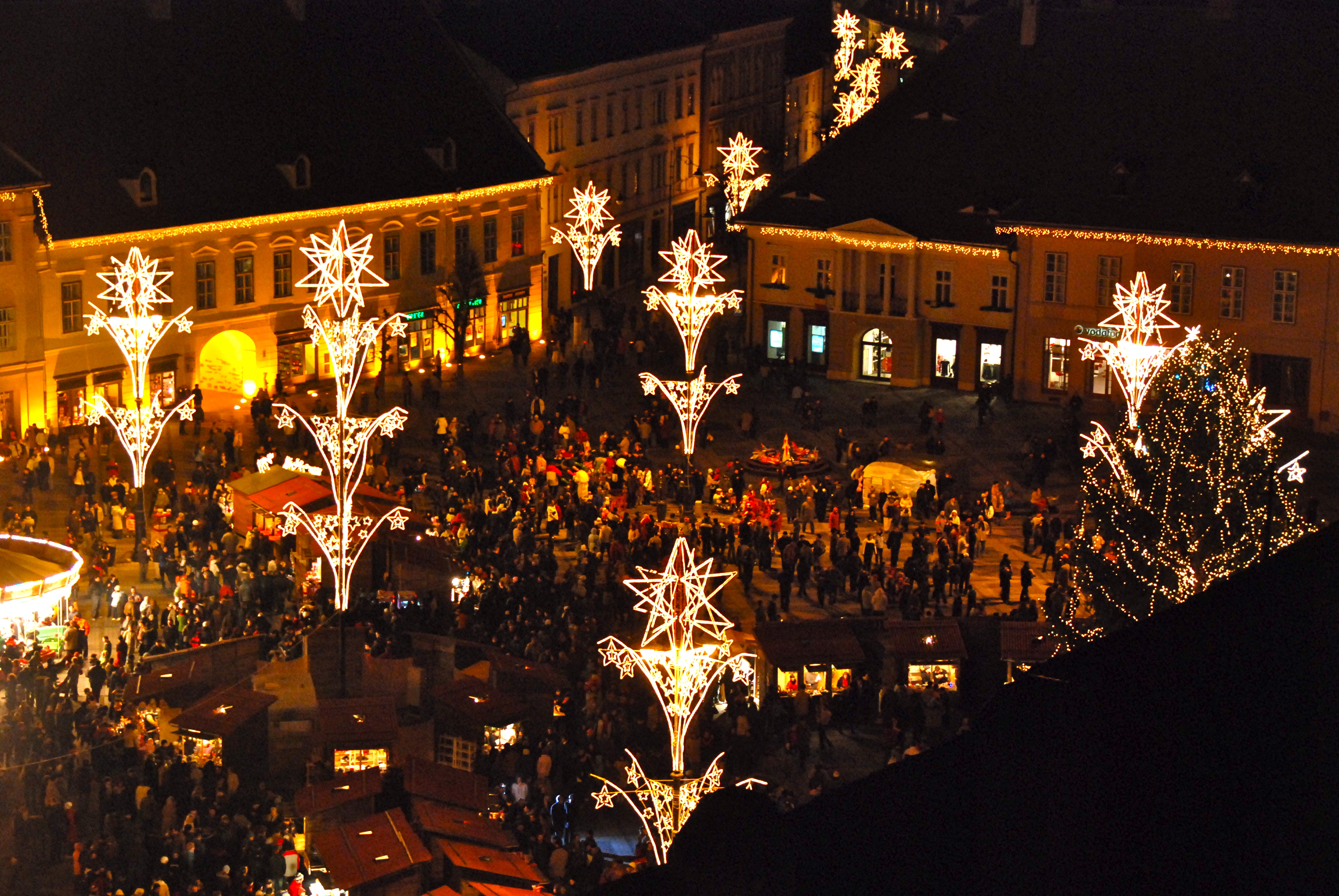
The Christmas market in Sibiu is one of the most famous in Europe.

There are 12 non-working public holidays, including the Great Union Day, celebrated on 1 December in commemoration of the 1918 union of Transylvania with Romania. Winter holidays include the Christmas and New Year festivities during which various unique folklore dances and games are common: plugușorul, sorcova, ursul, and capra. The traditional Romanian traditional clothing that otherwise has largely fallen out of use during the 20th century, is a popular ceremonial vestment worn on these festivities, especially in rural areas. There are sacrifices of live pigs during Christmas and lambs during Easter that has required a special exemption from EU law after 2007. In the Easter, traditions such as painting the eggs are very common. On 1 March mărțișor gifting is featured, which is a tradition whereby females are gifted with a type of talisman that is given for good luck.

=== Arts and monuments ===
Architecture

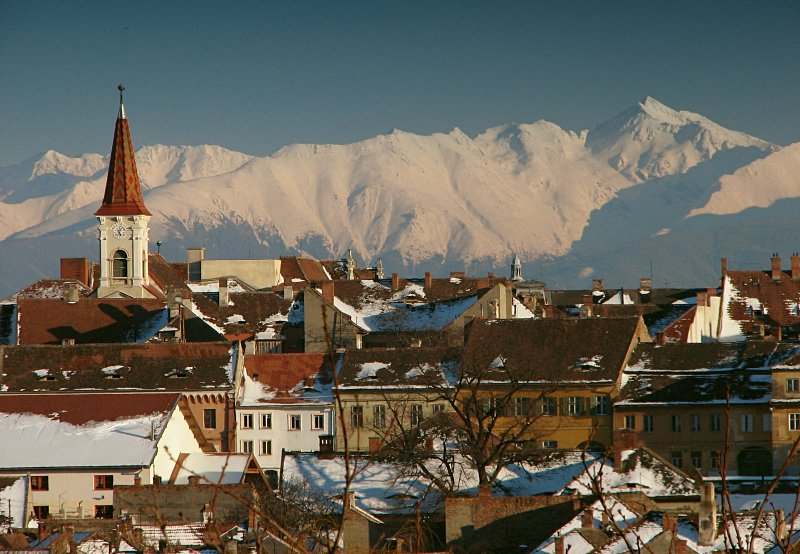
Sibiu was the 2007 European Capital of Culture and the 2019 European Region of Gastronomy.

The topic of the origin of Romanian culture began to be discussed by the end of the 18th century among the Transylvanian School scholars. Several writers rose to prominence in the 19th century, including: George Coșbuc, Ioan Slavici, Mihail Kogălniceanu, Vasile Alecsandri, Nicolae Bălcescu, Ion Luca Caragiale, Ion Creangă, and Mihai Eminescu, the later being considered the greatest and most influential Romanian poet, particularly for the poem Luceafărul.

In the 20th century, a number of Romanian artists and writers achieved international acclaim, including: Tristan Tzara, Marcel Janco, Mircea Eliade, Nicolae Grigorescu, Marin Preda, Liviu Rebreanu, Eugène Ionesco, Emil Cioran, and Constantin Brâncuși. Brâncuși has a sculptural ensemble in Târgu Jiu, while his sculpture Bird in Space, was auctioned in 2005 for $27.5 million. Romanian-born Holocaust survivor Elie Wiesel received the Nobel Peace Prize in 1986, while Banat Swabian writer Herta Müller received the 2009 Nobel Prize in Literature.

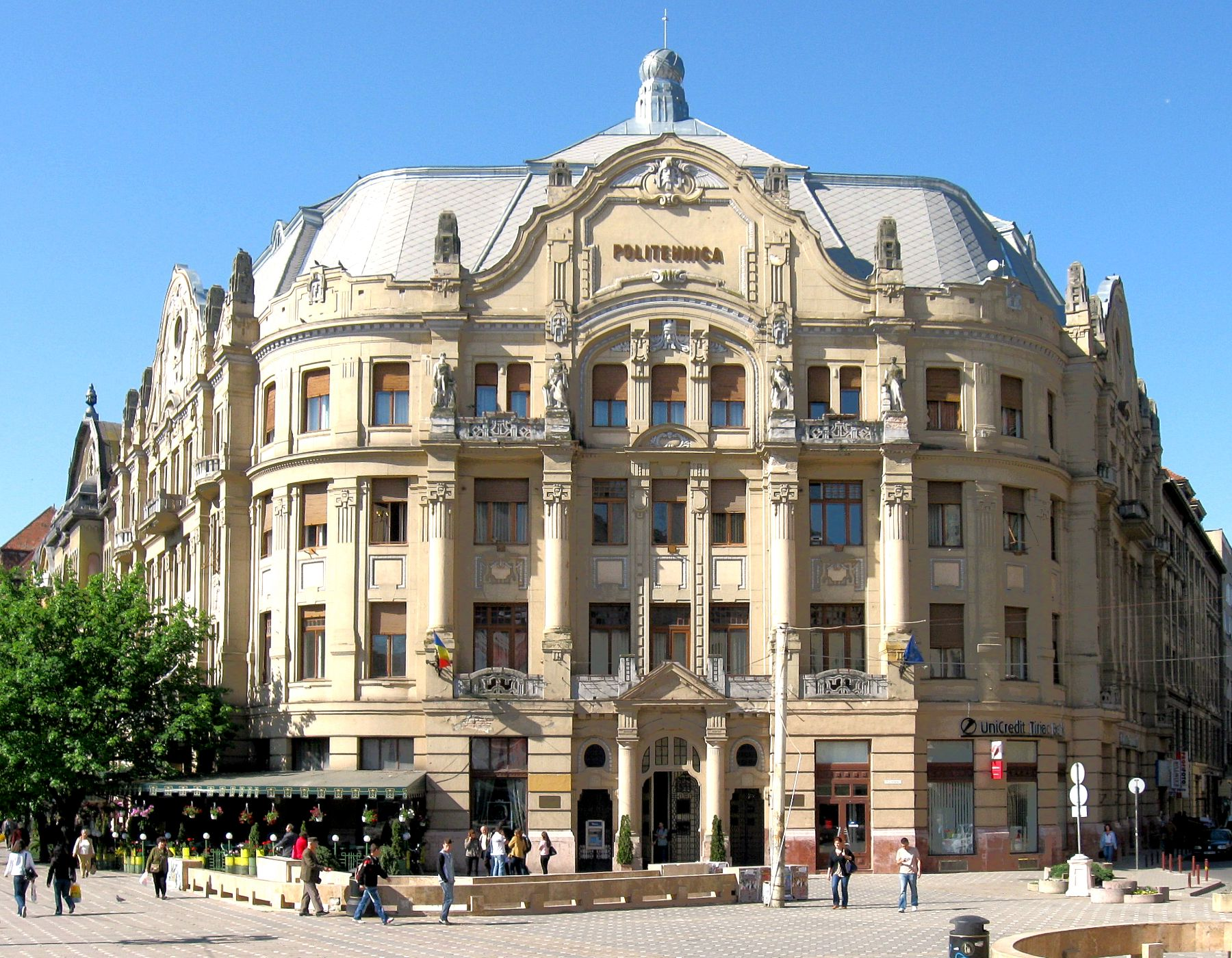
Timișoara was designated the European Capital of Culture in 2021 and held this title in 2023 due to COVID-19 postponement.

Prominent Romanian painters include: Nicolae Grigorescu, Ștefan Luchian, Ion Andreescu Nicolae Tonitza, and Theodor Aman. Notable Romanian classical composers of the 19th and 20th centuries include: Ciprian Porumbescu, Anton Pann, Eduard Caudella, Mihail Jora, Dinu Lipatti, and especially George Enescu. The annual George Enescu Festival is held in Bucharest in honour of the 20th-century composer.

Contemporary musicians like Angela Gheorghiu, Gheorghe Zamfir, Inna, Alexandra Stan, and many others have achieved various levels of international acclaim. From the late 2000s through the early 2010s, the Romanian popcorn music style had established itself in the international mainstream. At the Eurovision Song Contest Romanian singers achieved third place in 2005 and 2010.

In cinema, several movies of the Romanian New Wave have achieved international acclaim. At the Cannes Film Festival, The Death of Mr. Lazarescu by Cristi Puiu won the Prix Un Certain Regard in 2005, while 4 Months, 3 Weeks and 2 Days by Cristian Mungiu won the festival's top prize, the Palme d'Or, in 2007. At the Berlin International Film Festival, Child's Pose by Călin Peter Netzer won the Golden Bear in 2013.

The list of World Heritage Sites includes six cultural sites located within Romania, including eight painted churches of northern Moldavia, eight wooden churches of Maramureș, seven villages with fortified churches in Transylvania, the Horezu Monastery, and the Historic Centre of Sighișoara. The city of Sibiu, with its Brukenthal National Museum, was selected as the 2007 European Capital of Culture and the 2019 European Region of Gastronomy. Multiple castles exist in Romania, including the popular tourist attractions of Peleș Castle, Corvin Castle, and Bran Castle or "Dracula's Castle".

=== Cuisine ===
Romanian cuisine has been influenced by Austrian and German cuisine (especially in the historical regions that had been formerly administered by the Habsburg monarchy), but also shares some similarities with other cuisines in the Balkan region such as Greek, Bulgarian, and Serbian cuisine. Ciorbă includes a wide range of sour soups, while mititei, mămăligă (similar to polenta), and sarmale are featured commonly in main courses.

Pork, chicken, and beef are the preferred types of meat, but lamb and fish are also quite popular. Certain traditional recipes are made in direct connection with the holidays: chiftele, tobă and tochitură at Christmas; drob, pască and cozonac at Easter and other Romanian holidays. Țuică is a strong plum brandy reaching a 70% alcohol content which is the country's traditional alcoholic beverage, taking as much as 75% of the national crop (Romania is one of the largest plum producers in the world). Traditional alcoholic beverages also include wine, rachiu, palincă and vișinată, but beer consumption has increased dramatically over recent years. In 2019, Romania became the country with the highest alcohol consumption per capita.

=== Sports ===
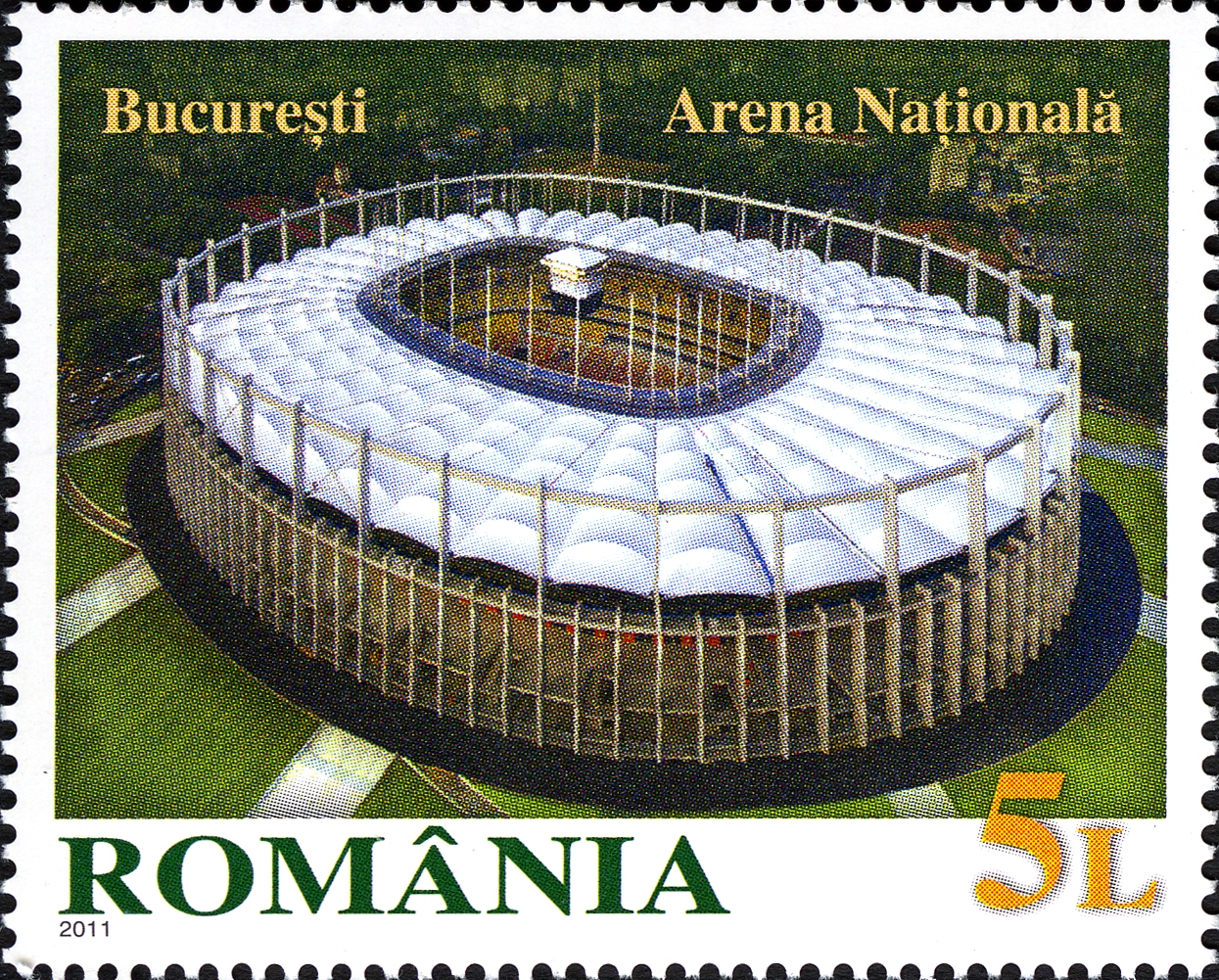
Arena Națională, opened in 2011, the national stadium of Romania, as seen on a Romanian stamp (2011)

Football is the most popular sport in Romania with over 219,000 registered players as of 2018. The market for professional football in Romania was roughly €740 million in 2018 according to UEFA.

The governing body is the Romanian Football Federation, which belongs to UEFA. The Romania national football team played its first match in 1922 and is one of only four national teams to have taken part in the first three FIFA World Cups, the other three being Brazil, France, and Belgium. Overall, it has played in seven World Cups and had its most successful period during the 1990s, when it finished 6th at the 1994 FIFA World Cup, eventually being ranked 3rd by FIFA in 1997.

The most successful club is Steaua București, who were the first Eastern European team to win the UEFA Champions League in 1986, and were runners-up in 1989. Dinamo București reached the UEFA Champions League semi-final in 1984 and the UEFA Cup Winners' Cup semi-final in 1990. Other important Romanian football clubs are Rapid București, UTA Arad, Universitatea Craiova, Petrolul Ploiești, CFR Cluj, Astra Giurgiu, and Viitorul Constanța (the latter having recently merged with FCV Farul Constanța).

Tennis is the second most popular sport. Romania reached the Davis Cup finals three times in 1969, 1971 and 1972. The second most popular team sport is handball. The men's team won the handball world championship in 1961, 1964, 1970, 1974 making them the third most successful nation ever in the tournament. The women's team won the world championship in 1962 and have enjoyed more success than their male counterparts in recent years. In the club competition Romanian teams have won the EHF Champions League a total of three times, Steaua București won in 1968 as well as 1977 and Dinamo București won in 1965. In women's handball, powerhouse CSM București lifted the EHF Champions League trophy in 2016.

Popular individual sports include combat sports, martial arts, and swimming. In professional boxing, Romania has produced many world champions across the weight divisions internationally recognised by governing bodies. Another popular combat sport is professional kickboxing, which has produced prominent practitioners including.

Romania's 306 all-time Summer Olympics medals would rank 12th most among all countries, while its 89 gold medals would be 14th most. The 1984 Summer Olympics was their most successful run, where they won 53 medals in total, 20 of them gold, ultimately placing 2nd to the hosts United States in the medal rankings. Amongst countries who have never hosted the event themselves, they are second in the total number of medals earned. Gymnastics is the country's major medal-producing sport.

== See also ==
- Outline of Romania
