= Survakane =

Bulgarian tradition

Survakane (Bulgarian: Сурвакане) is a Bulgarian custom used to wish a prosperous new year. Survakane is a tradition performed with a decorated stick, known as a survaknitsa (Bulgarian: сурвакница) or survachka (Bulgarian: сурвачка), on New Year's Day, as a measure for health during the year.

== Tradition ==
=== History ===
Survakane dates back to ancient times, and has its roots in pagan rituals. This much is clear about the origins of the tradition, although exactly when, where, or by whom it was practiced first is still a matter of debate.

=== Ritual ===
Survakane proper is a ritual in which a member of the family, typically the youngest, lightly pats the back of others with a survaknitsa on the morning of New Year's Day (known in Bulgarian as Vasilovden). (Note: Vasilovden is the name day of the name Vasil, among others, and falls on January 1.) While doing this, he or she recites a short verse wishing their relatives well for the new year. The members of the family (usually children) who do the ritual are known as survakari or survakarcheta. Afterwards, these children are awarded snacks, candy, or small amounts of money.

==== Poem ====
The poem that survakari varies between different families.

Сурва, сурва година,
весела година,
златен клас на нива,
червена ябълка в градина,
пълна къща с коприна,
живо-здраво догодина,
догодина, до амина.

Surva, surva godina,
Vesela godina,
Zlaten klas na niva,
Chervena yabŭlka v gradina,
Pŭlna kŭshta s koprina,
Zhivo-zdravo dogodina,
Dogodina, do amina.

=== Survaknitsa ===
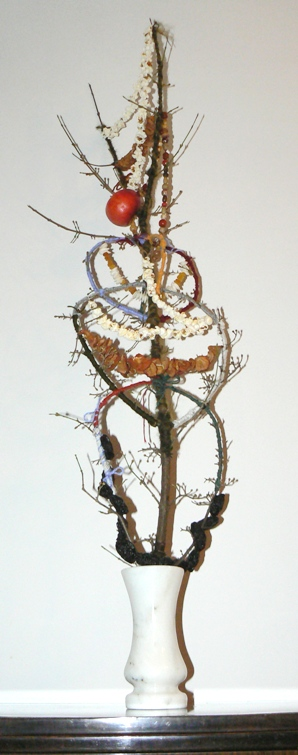
A decorated survaknitsa.

The survaknitsa or survachka is a curled branch of a cornel tree (Bulgarian: дрян), usually decorated with coins, popcorn, dried fruits, small bagels, ribbons, and threads, although different decorations are used in different regions of Bulgaria. Typically, northern Bulgarian survaknitsas will have fruits, bread, and seeds strung on them, while coins are used in the south. The branches are usually bent so as to resemble the Cyrillic letter "f" (Ф). The selection process for a branch is usually held a few days before New Year's, in order to have time to decorate the stick as the family sees fit.

The branch can be taken from any live fruit tree, although dogwood is preferred because of its long life and early blossoming, which are supposed to represent desirable qualities.

== See also ==
- Surva Festival
- Survaki
- Sorcova
