= Surva Festival =

Cultural festival in Pernik, Bulgaria

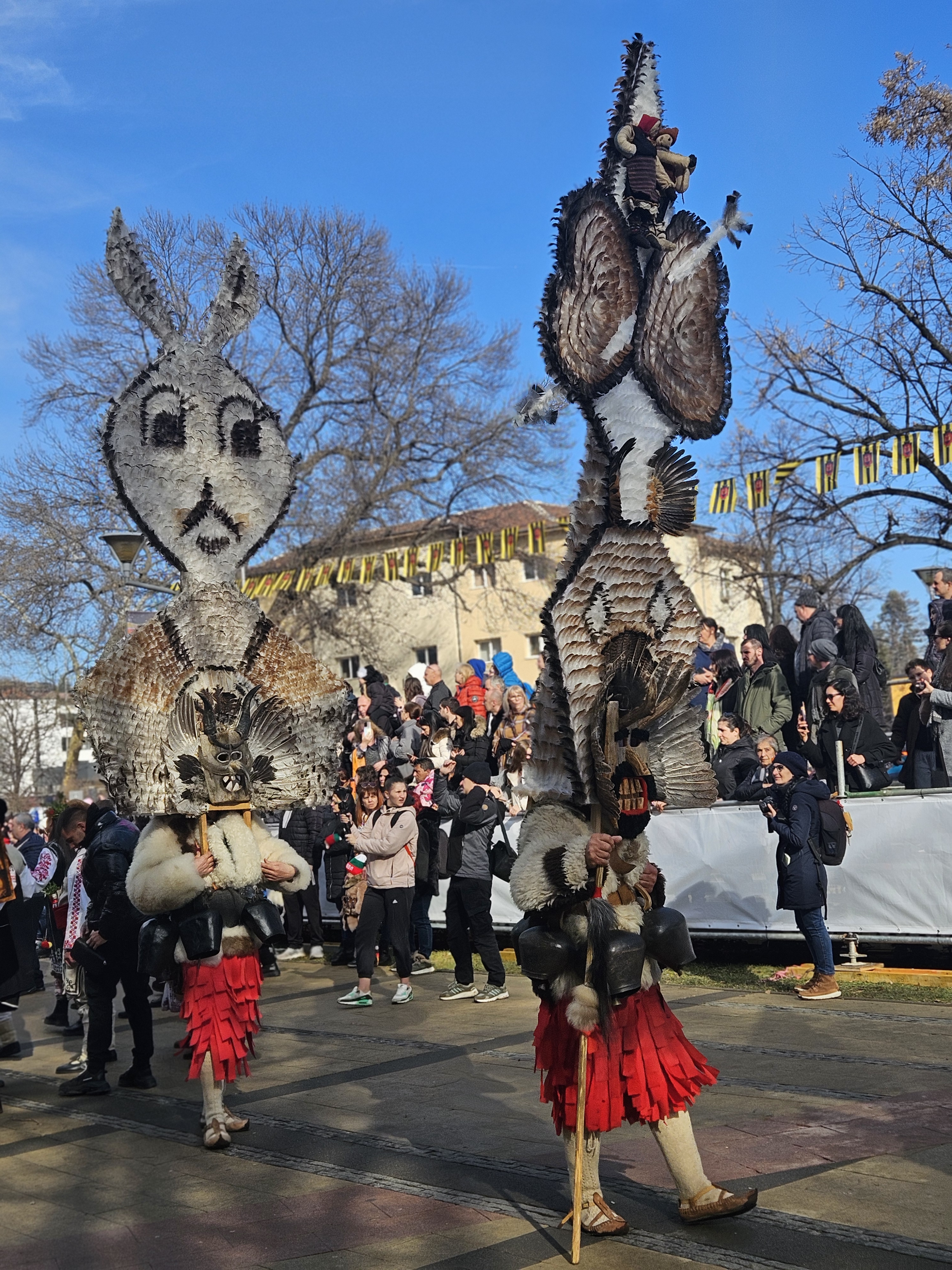
- Type: Cultural
- Significance: International festival of masquerade games
- Celebrations: Parades, open-air performances
- Begins: Last Friday of January
- Ends: Last Sunday of January
- Duration: 3 days
- Frequency: Annual

The Surva festival (Bulgarian: Сурва) is an International Festival of Masquerade Games. It is a three-day folk festival where thousands of participants from all over the country gather in Pernik, Bulgaria, wearing elaborate masks and costumes to ward off evil spirits.

The festival is deeply rooted in ancient pagan traditions and is recognised as one of the most cherished and significant events in the country’s history. Every year, thousands march in the village centre wearing loud metal bells and instruments around their waists.

== History ==
The Surva festival is one of Bulgaria's oldest and biggest masquerade festivals. It was first held in 1966 and became a yearly event in the village centre of Pernik.

The festival was founded by Yordan Nikolov, a choreographer who had worked with the District Council for Art and Culture since 1960. He proposed the idea of creating the festival ‘Pernik Winter’, which eventually became the Surva festival. The idea was for the city of Pernik to become the centre of these masquerade games.

== Dates ==
The Surva festival takes place every year on the last weekend of January. The festival is held as a celebration of the new year according to the Bulgar calendar, the old calendar that was used until 1916.

== Kukeri ==
Unmarried men from various folklore regions in Bulgaria and Europe can take part in the festival. The male performers are known as kukeri. They dress in traditional costumes with terrifying faces to frighten evil spirits and ‘unclean forces’ and bring good luck.

=== Masks and Costumes ===
The masks worn by the kukeri are typically made of wood, sometimes decorated with animal fur, beads, or embroideries. The costumes are also made of animal fur, symbolising the connection between man and nature. These colourful costumes are often too large to fit comfortably, emphasising the threat of the spirits they are meant to chase away.

They also feature a set of heavy bells attached to a belt worn around the waist. The loud clanging sounds and monstrous faces are believed to frighten evil spirits.

Traditionally, kukeri also visit people’s houses at night, warding off evil and bringing good luck. The costumes, like the traditions of the parade, are passed on from generation to generation.

They are inherited from past generations, while new costumes are made by the owner, who would work on them several months ahead of the parade.

The masks often depict large, bizarre creatures with frightening faces. They usually have horns, tails, beaks, and large teeth. The process of making the mask involves help from local artisans, but the exact process is a mystery to the outsider.

== The Grand Procession ==
The Surva festival is a three-day event featuring masquerade games, performances, and a grand procession. Most of the villages in Pernik have their own masquerade group. The grand procession involves thousands of kukeri marching through the streets, singing traditional songs, and performing choreographed dances.

=== International Participation ===
The ’’’rituals’’’ were once obligatory for unmarried men in Bulgaria, but today, hundreds of women and children participate in the masquerades. The women’s costumes are typically much lighter, including a traditional nosiya, a long skirt, and leather tsarvuli. Their hair is also decorated with colourful flowers.

The festival features around 10,000 participants from various Bulgarian towns, including kukeri from the Balkans and other countries. The 2024 and the 2025 Surva Festival featured over 12,000 participants each.

== Official Recognitions ==
In 1985, the festival gained international status. Pernik became a member of the Federation of European Carnival Cities. The city of Pernik was also declared the European Capital of Survakar and Kukeri Traditions in 2009.

In 2015, the festival was officially recognised by UNESCO, adding it to the Representative List of Intangible Cultural Heritage of Humanity.

In 2025, the town of Pernik was declared a ‘global center of masquerade traditions’ because of Surva.

== See also ==
- Pernik
- Survakane
- Survaki
