= Sorcova =

Romanian custom

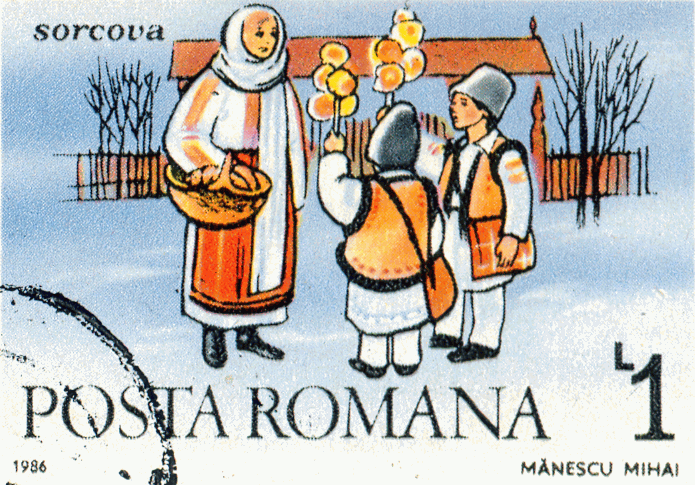
Sorcova on a Romanian postage stamp

Sorcova is a Romanian popular custom, practiced on the morning of 1 January. This custom is very old and is spread throughout the country, being practiced mainly by children. Sorcova is also used to describe the object that characterizes this custom. It consists of a stick or twig decorated with artificial flowers of different colors, wherewith children tap their parents or acquaintances on the back in the morning of New Year, wishing them, in special verses, health and luck. When they begin to say the verses, sorcova is inclined in the direction of the person to whom they address all wishes, sorcova playing the role of a magic wand, endowed with the ability to transmit health, youth and fertility to the vised one; verses are very suggestive in this regard. The text of sorcova, reminiscent of a spell, merely reinforces the movement of sorcova.

== By region ==
This custom varies depending on the ethnographic region. In northern Transylvania, children go with sorcova from house to house, wishing health in exchange for local delicacies (cozonac, colac, apples, nuts). In urban areas, it is common for children to receive cash, candies or oranges.

An interesting form of custom can be found in the west of the country (village of Bucium, Bihor County). Children have a fir tree branch decorated with tinsel, candies and țingălău (bell). Whoever does not have a fir tree can go with a stick wrapped in tinsel, on which are held three or four țingălăi. When they enter the house, those with fir tree sing and those with the stick hit rhythmically the floor after melody. Commonly, every child has his sorcova. While reciting, sorcova is moved in the rhythm of versification, sometimes marked by the sound of the bell.

== Etymology ==
The term of sorcova comes from the Bulgarian word surov (tender green), allusion to the budded twig, broken from a tree, especially a fir tree. Some etymologists consider that sorcova derives from the Slavic word sorokŭ (forty): the recitative of sorcova consists of 40 syllabic groups corresponding to the 40 touches of sorcova.

== See also ==
- Survakane

Portal:Romania
