= NUTS statistical regions of Romania =

In the NUTS (Nomenclature of Territorial Units for Statistics) codes of Romania (RO), the three levels are:

Level	Subdivisions	#
NUTS 1	Macroregions (Macroregiuni)	4
NUTS 2	Regions (Regiuni)	8
NUTS 3	Counties + Bucharest (Județe + București)	42

== NUTS codes ==
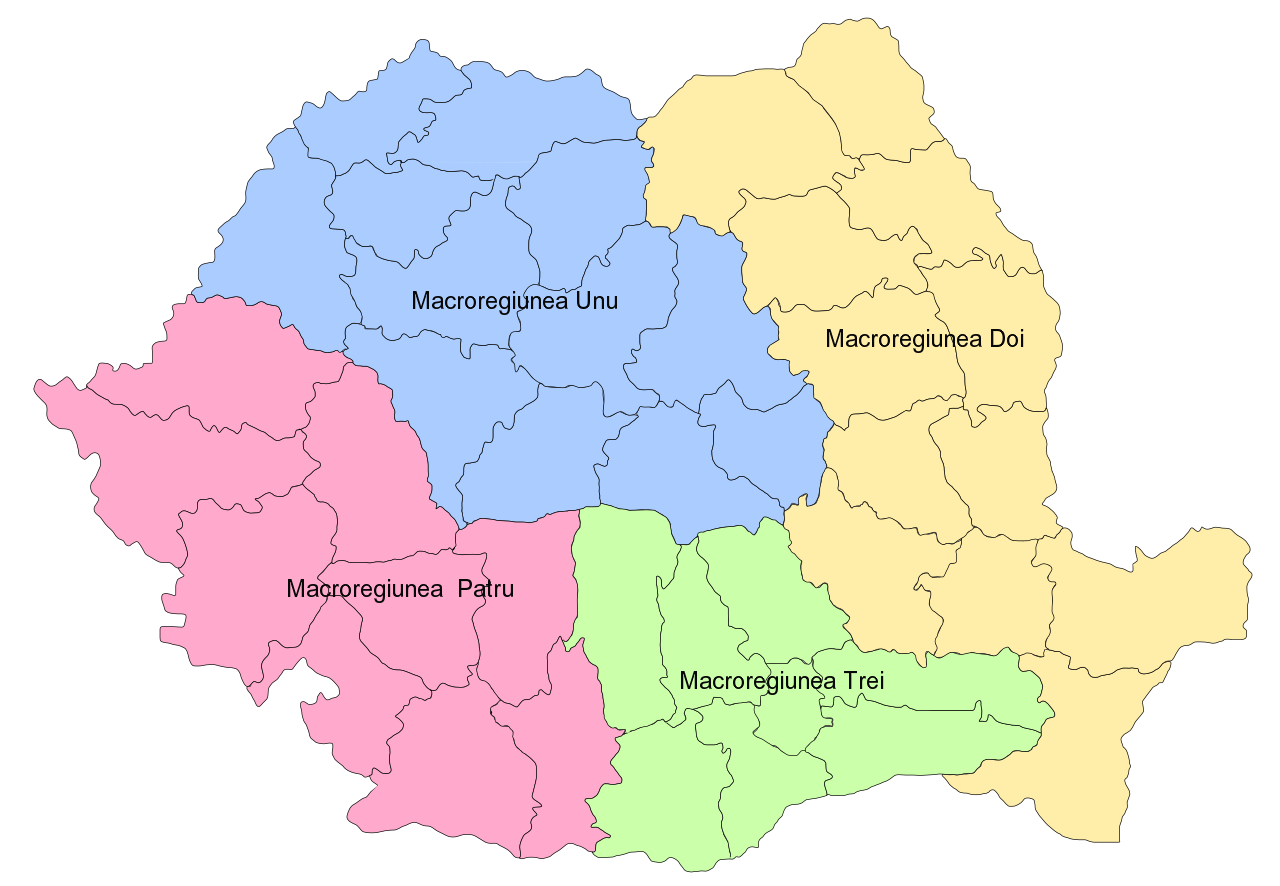
NUTS 1 regions of Romania

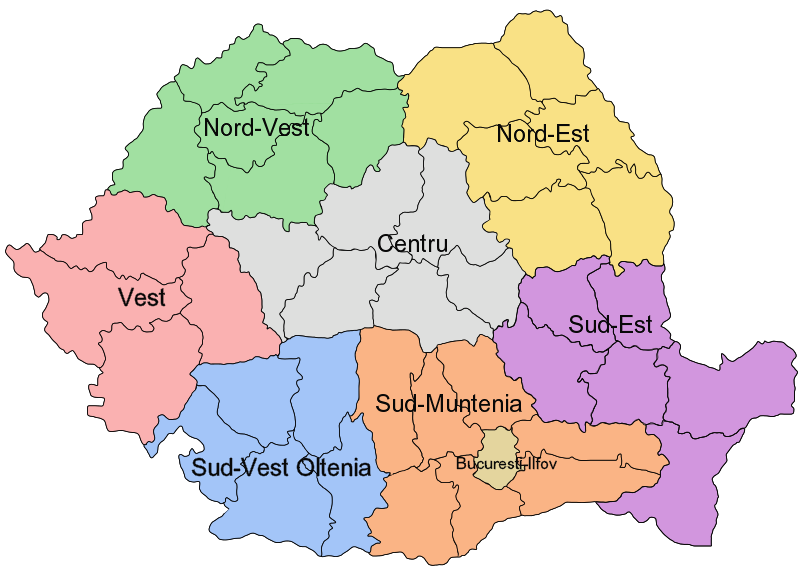
NUTS 2 regions of Romania

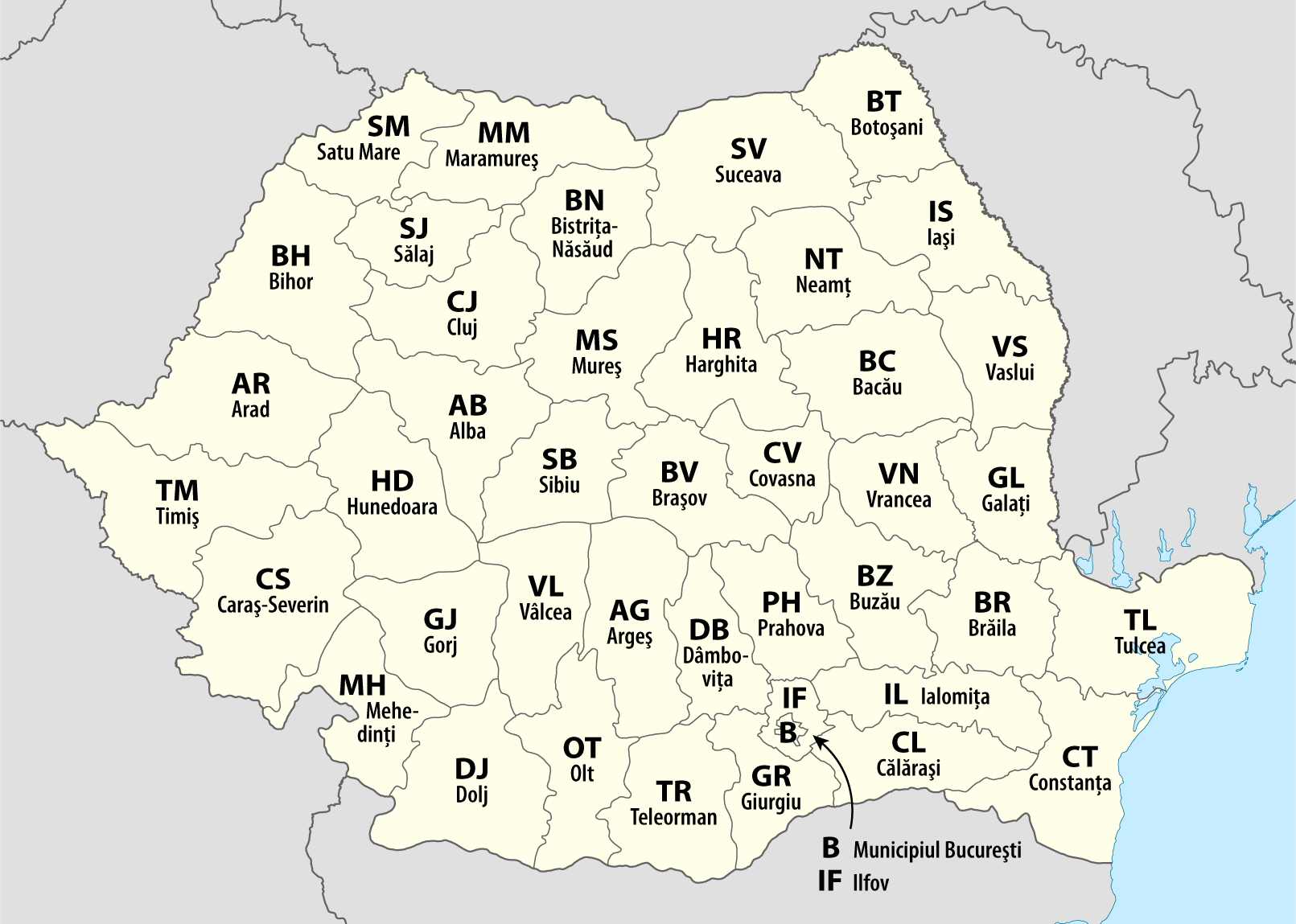
NUTS 3 regions of Romania

RO1 Macroregion one (Macroregiunea Unu)

RO11 Nord-Vest

RO111 Bihor County
RO112 Bistrița-Năsăud County
RO113 Cluj County
RO114 Maramureș County
RO115 Satu Mare County
RO116 Sălaj County

RO12 Centru

RO121 Alba County
RO122 Brașov County
RO123 Covasna County
RO124 Harghita County
RO125 Mureș County
RO126 Sibiu County

RO2 Macroregion two (Macroregiunea Doi)

RO21 Nord-Est

RO211 Bacău County
RO212 Botoșani County
RO213 Iași County
RO214 Neamț County
RO215 Suceava County
RO216 Vaslui County

RO22 Sud-Est

RO221 Brăila County
RO222 Buzău County
RO223 Constanța County
RO224 Galați County
RO225 Tulcea County
RO226 Vrancea County

RO3 Macroregion three (Macroregiunea Trei)

RO31 Sud-Muntenia

RO311 Argeș County
RO312 Călărași County
RO313 Dâmbovița County
RO314 Giurgiu County
RO315 Ialomița County
RO316 Prahova County
RO317 Teleorman County

RO32 București-Ilfov

RO321 București
RO322 Ilfov County

RO4 Macroregion four (Macroregiunea Patru)

RO41 Sud-Vest Oltenia

RO411 Dolj County
RO412 Gorj County
RO413 Mehedinți County
RO414 Olt County
RO415 Vâlcea County

RO42 Vest

RO421 Arad County
RO422 Caraș-Severin County
RO423 Hunedoara County
RO424 Timiș County

In the 2003 version, the codes were as follows:

RO0 Romania

RO01 Nord-Est

RO011 Bacău County
RO012 Botoșani County
RO013 Iași County
RO014 Neamț County
RO015 Suceava County
RO016 Vaslui County

RO02 Sud-Est

RO021 Brăila County
RO022 Buzău County
RO023 Constanța County
RO024 Galați County
RO025 Tulcea County
RO026 Vrancea County

RO03 Sud-Muntenia

RO031 Argeș County
RO032 Călărași County
RO033 Dâmbovița County
RO034 Giurgiu County
RO035 Ialomița County
RO036 Prahova County
RO037 Teleorman County

RO04 Sud-Vest Oltenia

RO041 Dolj County
RO042 Gorj County
RO043 Mehedinți County
RO044 Olt County
RO045 Vâlcea County

RO05 Vest

RO051 Arad County
RO052 Caraș-Severin County
RO053 Hunedoara County
RO054 Timiș County

RO06 Nord-Vest

RO061 Bihor County
RO062 Bistrița-Năsăud County
RO063 Cluj County
RO064 Maramureș County
RO065 Satu Mare County
RO066 Sălaj County

RO07 Centru

RO071 Alba County
RO072 Brașov County
RO073 Covasna County
RO074 Harghita County
RO075 Mureș County
RO076 Sibiu County

RO08 București-Ilfov

RO081 București
RO082 Ilfov County

== Local administrative units ==
Below the NUTS levels, the two LAU (Local Administrative Units) levels are:

Level	Subdivisions	#
LAU 1	— (same as NUTS 3)	42
LAU 2	Communes + Towns + Municipalities (Cities) (Comune + Orașe + Municipii)	3180

The LAU codes of Romania can be downloaded here:

== See also ==
- List of Romanian regions by Human Development Index
- Subdivisions of Romania
- ISO 3166-2 codes of Romania
- FIPS region codes of Romania

== Sources ==
- Hierarchical list of the Nomenclature of territorial units for statistics - NUTS and the Statistical regions of Europe
- Overview map of EU Countries - NUTS level 1
  - ROMÂNIA - NUTS level 2
  - ROMÂNIA - NUTS level 3
- Correspondence between the NUTS levels and the national administrative units
- List of current NUTS codes
  - Download current NUTS codes (ODS format)
- Counties of Romania, Statoids.com
