= Metropolitan areas in Romania =

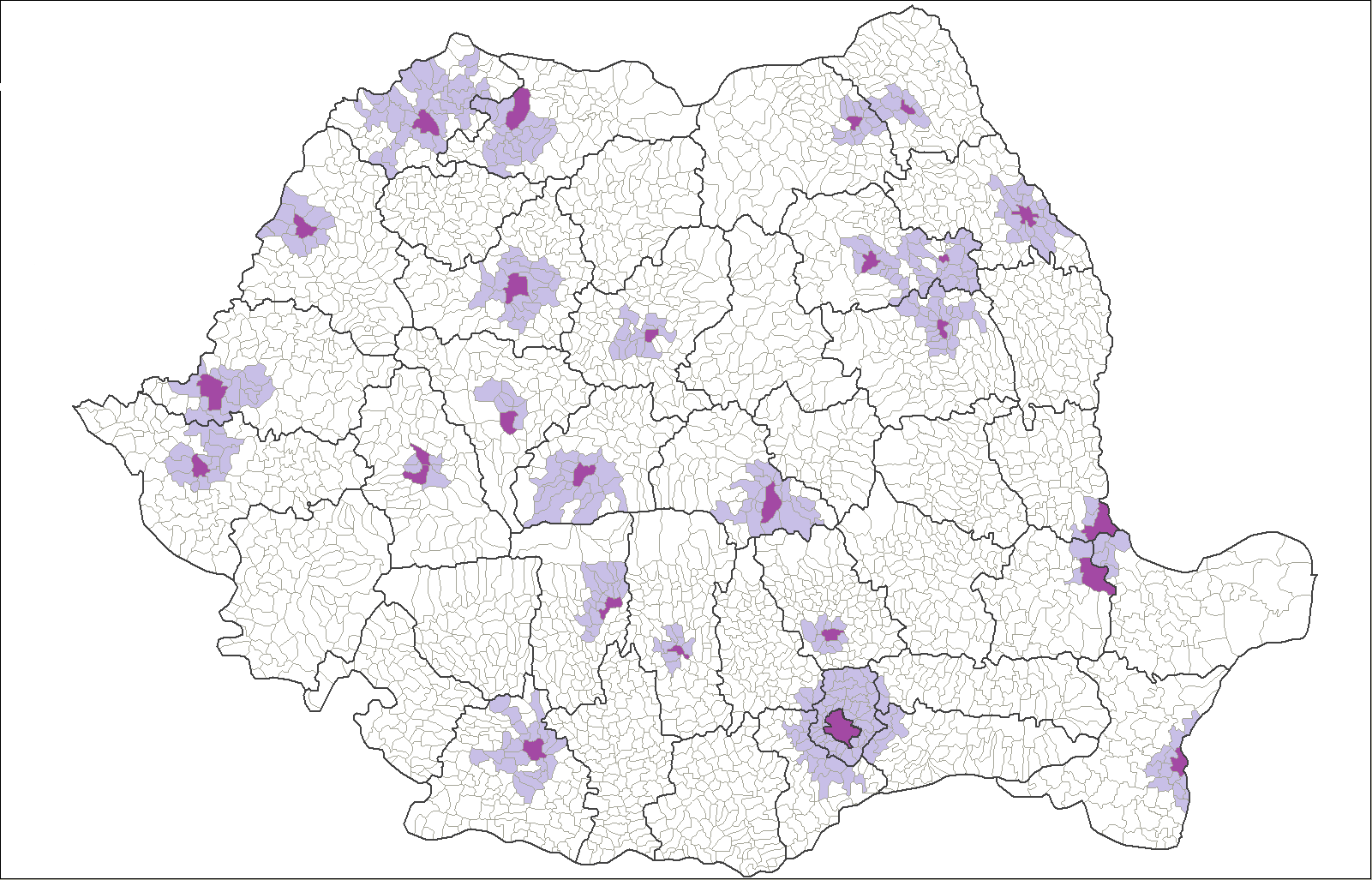
Metropolitan areas in Romania

Metropolitan areas in Romania are private agencies of public utility which were established by Law no. 351 of 6 July 2001 with the aim of encouraging the development of neighboring towns and communes within a radius of 30 km. The first to be established was the metropolitan area of Iași, on 8 April 2004, while the last is that of Drobeta-Turnu Severin, on 28 August 2019. There are 24 metropolitan areas in Romania that have been constituted as of 2019.

== Legislative status ==
The 2001 legislation regulates the status of the 319 cities in Romania according to their population and regional importance (Law no. 351 of 6 July 2001):

- rank 0 – the capital of Romania, municipality of European importance;
- rank I – municipalities of national importance, with potential influence at European level;
- rank II – municipalities of inter-county or county importance or with a balancing role in the network of localities;
- rank III – towns.

Legislation also restricts the possibility to engage into a metropolitan area project to only those cities that are of rank 0 or I. The metropolitan areas are thus organized as legal entities without legal personality, being able to function on a perimeter independent of the limits of the administrative-territorial units, established by mutual agreement by the local public administration authorities. Legislation was amended in 2011 to allow county seat municipalities to form metropolitan areas in association with urban and rural localities in their immediate vicinity (i.e., up to 30 km from the main city).

== Constituted metropolitan areas ==
Disbanded metropolitan area
Metropolitan area not member of the Romanian Federation of Metropolitan Areas and Urban Agglomerations (FZMAUR)

Constituted Metropolitan Areas in Romania
Name	Population (2021)	Area (km^{2})	Density (pop/km^{2})	Component localities	Established
Alba Iulia	144,341	910	159	Cities of Alba Iulia and Sebeș, town of Teiuș and 8 communes	2007
Bacău	319,624	1,065	300	City of Bacău, town of Buhuși and 22 communes	2007
Baia Mare	244,238	1,388	176	City of Baia Mare, towns of Baia Sprie, Cavnic, Seini, Șomcuta Mare and Tăuții-Măgherăuș and 13 communes	2006
Botoșani	162,318	528	307	City of Botoșani, town of Bucecea and 7 communes	2012
Brașov	476,893	1,745	273	Cities of Brașov, Codlea and Săcele, towns of Ghimbav, Predeal, Râșnov and Zărnești and 11 communes	2006
Bucharest	2,536,859	1,821	1,393	City of Bucharest and all of Ilfov County including towns of Voluntari, Pantelimon, Buftea, Popești-Leordeni, Bragadiru, Chitila, Otopeni, Măgurele	2016
Cluj	433,247	1,603	270	City of Cluj-Napoca and 19 communes	2008
Constanța	491,746	2,121	232	City of Constanța, towns of Eforie, Murfatlar, Năvodari, Ovidiu and Techirghiol and 10 communes	2007
Corvina (Deva–Hunedoara)	173,393	410	423	Cities of Deva and Hunedoara, towns of Călan and Simeria and 3 communes	2008
Craiova	392,898	1,499	262	City of Craiova, towns of Filiași and Segarcea and 21 communes	2009
Drobeta-Turnu Severin	141,837	555	256	Cities of Drobeta-Turnu Severin and Orșova and 5 communes	2019
Iași	492,556	808	610	City of Iași and 13 communes	2004
Oradea	277,605	754	368	City of Oradea and 11 communes	2005
Piatra Neamț	166,974	461	362	City of Piatra Neamț, town of Roznov and 8 communes	2013
Pitești	228,554	479	477	City of Pitești, town of Ștefănești and 7 communes	2009
Ploiești	363,089	717	506	City of Ploiești, towns of Băicoi, Boldești-Scăeni and Plopeni and 10 communes	2009
Râmnicu Vâlcea	191,934	—N/a	—N/a	City of Râmnicu Vâlcea, towns of Băbeni, Băile Govora, Băile Olănești, Călimănești and Ocnele Mari and 14 communes	2013-2015 (disbanded)
Reșița	117,612	777	151	City of Reșița, town of Bocșa and 8 communes	2013
Roman	162,533	1,121	145	City of Roman and 24 communes	2009
Satu Mare	250,290	2,251	111	Cities of Carei and Satu Mare, towns of Ardud and Tășnad and 22 communes	2013
Suceava	211,708	682	310	City of Suceava, town of Salcea and 13 communes	2011
Târgu Mureș	230,143	695	331	City of Târgu Mureș, town of Ungheni and 13 communes	2006
Timișoara	468,430	1,080	388	City of Timișoara and 14 communes	2008
Vaslui	149,601	541	277	City of Vaslui and 10 communes	2015
Zalău	153,206	1,048	146	City of Zalău, towns of Cehu Silvaniei, Jibou and Șimleu Silvaniei and 14 communes	2015

== Planned metropolitan areas ==
Metropolitan areas in Romania in planning stages
Name	Population (2018)	Component localities
Alexandria	98,763	City of Alexandria and 14 communes
Arad	355,863	City of Arad, towns of Curtici, Lipova, Nădlac, Pâncota, Pecica and Sântana and 26 communes
Bistrița	153,631	City of Bistrița and 15 communes
Brăila	226,282	City of Brăila and 5 communes
Buzău	201,057	City of Buzău and 11 communes
Călărași	116,960	City of Călărași and 9 communes
Focșani	201,129	City of Focșani, towns of Mărășești and Odobești and 21 communes
Galați	396,528	City of Galați and 20 communes
Giurgiu	86,017	City of Giurgiu and 6 communes
Miercurea Ciuc	105,799	City of Miercurea Ciuc, towns of Băile Tușnad and Bălan and 19 communes
Sfântu Gheorghe	93,593	City of Sfântu Gheorghe and 13 communes
Sibiu	288,612	City of Sibiu, towns of Avrig, Cisnădie, Ocna Sibiului, Săliște and Tălmaciu and 17 communes
Slatina	141,598	City of Slatina, town of Piatra-Olt and 19 communes
Slobozia	60,312	City of Slobozia and 3 communes
Târgoviște	218,613	City of Târgoviște and 26 communes
Târgu Jiu	158,189	City of Târgu Jiu, towns of Bumbești-Jiu and Tismana and 14 communes
Tulcea	110,495	City of Tulcea and 6 communes

== Conurbations ==
- Baia Mare–Satu Mare (estimated population: 400,000)
- Bucharest–Ploiești–Târgoviște (estimated population: 3 million)
- Lower Danube (Galați–Brăila) (estimated population: 580,000)
- Prahova Valley (Câmpina–Predeal) |(estimated population: 150,000)
- Suceava–Botoșani (estimated population: 300,000)
- Timișoara–Arad (estimated population: 805,000)

== Functional urban areas ==
In the EU, as defined by Eurostat, a functional urban area (FUA) – formerly known as larger urban zone (LUZ) – consists of a city and its commuting zone.

Largest functional urban areas of Romania
Rank	Name	County	Development region	Population (2018)
1	Bucharest	–	Bucharest–Ilfov	2,478,618
2	Iași	Iași	Northeast	500,668
3	Constanța	Constanța	Southeast	419,033
4	Brașov	Brașov	Center	401,516
5	Cluj-Napoca	Cluj	Northwest	396,339
6	Timișoara	Timiș	West	364,325
7	Galați	Galați	Southeast	322,953
8	Craiova	Dolj	Southwest	321,329
9	Ploiești	Prahova	South	289,394
10	Oradea	Bihor	Northwest	239,926
11	Bacău	Bacău	Northeast	225,852
12	Sibiu	Sibiu	Center	215,248
13	Pitești	Argeș	South	214,287
14	Brăila	Brăila	Southeast	210,271
15	Arad	Arad	West	203,695

== See also ==
- List of cities in Romania
- Lower Danube metropolitan area
