= Counties of Romania =

Counties of Romania Județele României (Romanian)
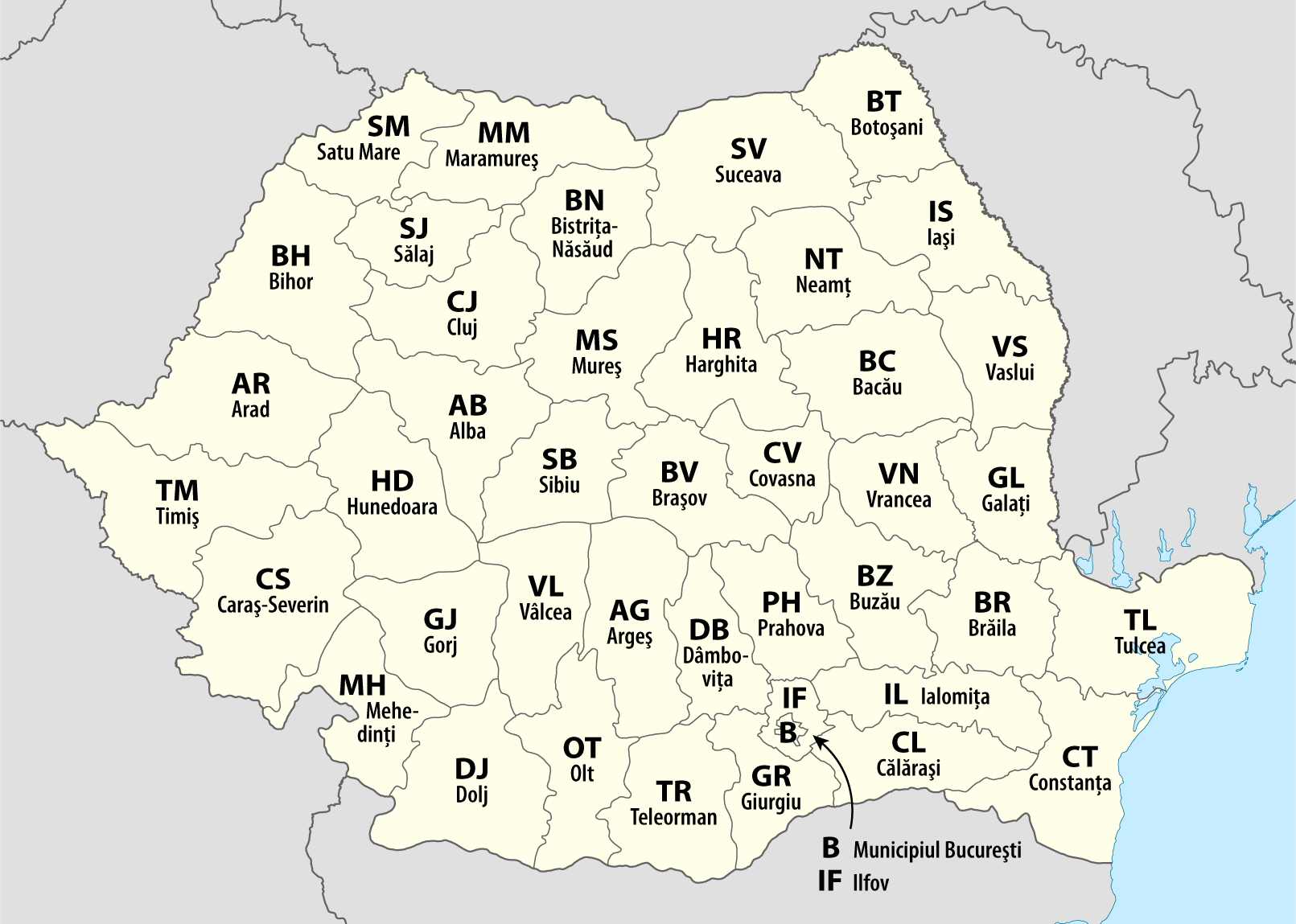
- The 41 counties of Romania and Municipality of Bucharest (clickable imagemap)
- Category: Unitary state
- Location: Romania
- Created: 1997 (Current form, 41 + Bucharest); 1859 (33); 1926 (71); 1941 (73); 1968 (38 + Bucharest + Ilfov Agricultural Sector); 1981 (40 + Bucharest)
- Abolished: 1950–1968
- Number: 41 (as of 1997)
- Additional status: electoral constituency
- Populations: 193,355 (TL) – 760,774 (IS)/1,716,983 (B)
- Areas: 228 km^{2} (88 sq mi) (B)/1,583 km^{2} (611 sq mi) (IF) – 8,697 km^{2} (3,358 sq mi) (TM)
- Government: County Council and County Council President
- Subdivisions: Municipiu/town/commune/sector

A total of 41 counties (Romanian: județe), along with the municipiu of Bucharest, constitute the official administrative divisions of Romania. They represent the country's NUTS-3 (Nomenclature of Territorial Units for Statistics – Level 3) statistical subdivisions within the European Union and each of them serves as the local level of government within its borders. Most counties are named after a major river, while some are named after notable cities within them, such as the county seat.

The earliest organization into județe of the Principalities of Wallachia and Moldavia (where they were termed ținuturi) dates back to at least the late 14th century. For most of the time since modern Romania was formed in 1859, the administrative division system has been similar to that of the French departments. The system has since changed several times and the number of counties has varied over time, from the 71 județe that existed before World War II to only 39 after 1968. The current format has largely been in place since 1968 as only small changes have been made since then, the last of which was in 1997.

According to the 2021 census data from the National Institute of Statistics, the average population of Romania's 41 counties is about 423,000, with Iași County as the most populous (760,000) and Tulcea County (193,000) the least. The average county's land area is 5,809 square kilometres (2,243 sq mi), with Timiș County (8,697 square kilometres (3,358 sq mi)) the largest and Ilfov County (1,583 square kilometres (611 sq mi)) the smallest. Bucharest, which has the same administrative level as that of a county, is both more populous and much smaller than any county, with 1,716,983 people and 228 square kilometres (88 sq mi).

== History ==
The 71 counties of Romania between 1925 and 1940

Current counties imposed over the inter-war counties

The earliest organization into județe (for Wallachia), and ținuturi (for Moldavia), dates back at least to the late 14th century. (Note: Județ originates from the Latin judicium and ținut probably from the Latin tenutum.) Inspired from the organization of the late Byzantine Empire, each județ was ruled by a jude (or pârcălab for a ținut), a person officially appointed with administrative and judicial functions. Transylvania was divided into royal counties headed by comes (royal counts) with administrative and judicial functions.

After modern Romania was formed in 1859 through the union of Wallachia and the rump of Moldavia, the administrative division was modernized using the French administrative system as a model, with județ as the basic administrative unit. Aside from the 1950–1968 period, this system has remained in place until today. Since 1864, for each județ there exists a prefect, a subordinate of the Ministry of Internal Affairs and representative of the government inside the county; he is also the head of local administration for areas not delegated to local authorities. Until 1948, each județ was further divided into several plăși, each administered by a pretor.

After the adoption of a new Constitution in 1923, the traditional local administrative systems of the newly acquired regions of Transylvania, Bukovina and Bessarabia were made uniform in 1925 with that of the Romanian Old Kingdom. County borders were kept largely intact, with few adjustments, and the total number of counties was raised to 71; this lasted until the beginning of World War II.

In 1938, King Carol II modified the law on the administration of the Romanian territory according to the fascist model. Ten ținuturi (approx. translation "lands") were created, ruled by Rezidenți Regali (Royal Residents), appointed directly by the Monarch. The ținuturi represented another layer of administration between counties and the country, as the county borders were not erased.

Due to the territorial changes during World War II, this style of administration did not last, and the administration at the județ level was reintroduced after the war. Between 1941 and 1944, Romania administered the territory between the Dniester and Southern Bug rivers known as Transnistria, which consisted of 13 separate counties.

After taking over the administration of the country in 1945, the Communist Party changed the administrative model to that of the Soviet Union (regions and raions) in 1950, but changed it back in 1968. Nevertheless, the county borders set then were quite different from those present during the interbellum, as only 39 counties were formed from the 56 remaining after the war.

In 1981, Giurgiu and Călărași were split from Ialomița and the former county of Ilfov, while in 1997, Ilfov County, which had been a dependency of Bucharest for nearly two decades, was reinstated. The county borders set in 1968 are still largely in place today, but the functions of different authorities have changed due to administrative reforms in the 1990s.

At present, Romania is divided into 41 counties and one municipiu (Bucharest); these are assigned as the NUTS-3 geocode statistical subdivision scheme of Romania within the European Union. Each of the counties is further divided into cities (some of which have municipiu status) and communes. The prefect and his administration have executive prerogatives within the county limits, while limited legislative powers are assigned to a County Council elected every four years during local elections. The territorial districts of the Romanian judicial system overlap with county borders, thus avoiding further complication in the separation of powers on the government.

== Current list ==
CoA	County	County seat	Name origin (Note: Most of the names of the present counties originate from one of the larger rivers that flow through the county. In a number of cases, the name of the county seat or another large city in the county is the same as that river.)	Region	ISO code (Note: These are the ISO 3166-2:RO codes which coincide with the license plate ones; they are also used as usual abbreviations, such as in mailing addresses.)	Postal code (Note: The postal code format is of the type xxyzw, with xx being the numbers associated with the county; the digits y, z, and w indicate the city, the street, part of the street, or even the building of the address.)	Area code (Note: Landline phone numbers are of the type +40-abb-xxx-xxx, where 40 is the country code, bb is the area code, and a is a digit indicating the operator: 2 for the former national operator, Romtelecom, and 3 for the other ground telephone networks. Mobile phone numbers, however, only start with the digit 7 (for a) and do not follow county borders.)	NUTS code (Note: The development region code follows the format ROxyz, where x is the macroregion number, y represents the development region and is either 1 or 2, and z is the county number within the region.)	Pop. (1 December 2021)	Area	Density (pop./km²)	Map
Coat of arms of Alba County	Alba	Alba Iulia	county seat	Center	AB	51	58	RO121	325,941	6,250 km^{2} (2,410 sq mi)	52	Map of Romania highlighting Alba County
Coat of arms of Arad County	Arad	Arad	county seat	West	AR	31	57	RO421	410,143	7,746 km^{2} (2,991 sq mi)	53	Map of Romania highlighting Arad County
Coat of arms of Argeș County	Argeș	Pitești	Argeș River	South-Muntenia	AG	11	48	RO311	569,932	6,822 km^{2} (2,634 sq mi)	84	Map of Romania highlighting Argeș County
Coat of arms of Bacău County	Bacău	Bacău	county seat	North-East	BC	60	34	RO211	601,387	6,622 km^{2} (2,557 sq mi)	91	Map of Romania highlighting Bacău County
Coat of arms of Bihor County	Bihor	Oradea	Biharia commune	North-West	BH	41	59	RO111	551,297	7,539 km^{2} (2,911 sq mi)	73	Map of Romania highlighting Bihor County
Coat of arms of Bistrița-Năsăud County	Bistrița-Năsăud	Bistrița	Bistrița River and Năsăud city	North-West	BN	42	63	RO112	295,988	5,358 km^{2} (2,069 sq mi)	55	Map of Romania highlighting Bistrița-Năsăud County
Coat of arms of Botoșani County	Botoșani	Botoșani	county seat	North-East	BT	71	31	RO212	392,821	4,987 km^{2} (1,925 sq mi)	79	Map of Romania highlighting Botoșani County
Coat of arms of Brașov County	Brașov	Brașov	county seat	Center	BV	50	68	RO122	546,615	5,361 km^{2} (2,070 sq mi)	102	Map of Romania highlighting Brașov County
Coat of arms of Brăila County	Brăila	Brăila	county seat	South-East	BR	81	39	RO221	281,452	4,766 km^{2} (1,840 sq mi)	59	Map of Romania highlighting Brăila County
Coat of arms of Bucharest	Bucharest (Note: Bucharest is not a county, but a municipiu that has an identical administrative status to all the other 41 counties.)		last name Bucur	Bucharest-Ilfov	B	01–06 (Note: Due to Bucharest's significantly larger population, it has a different postal code for each of its six sectors.)	1x (Note: Bucharest and Ilfov county have the same code. Due to their large population, phone numbers have only the suffix "1" (unlike two-digit suffixes for counties) followed by seven digits (only six digits for anywhere else).)	RO321	1,716,983	240 km^{2} (93 sq mi)	7,154	Map of Romania highlighting the location of Bucharest
Coat of arms of Buzău County	Buzău	Buzău	Buzău River	South-East	BZ	12	38	RO222	404,979	6,101 km^{2} (2,356 sq mi)	66	Map of Romania highlighting Buzău County
Coat of arms of Caraș-Severin County	Caraș-Severin	Reșița	defunct Caraș and Severin Counties	West	CS	32	55	RO422	246,588	8,532 km^{2} (3,294 sq mi)	29	Map of Romania highlighting Caraș-Severin County
Coat of arms of Călărași County	Călărași	Călărași	county seat	South-Muntenia	CL	91	42	RO312	283,458	5,087 km^{2} (1,964 sq mi)	56	Map of Romania highlighting Călărași County
Coat of arms of Cluj County	Cluj	Cluj-Napoca	county seat	North-West	CJ	40	64	RO113	679,141	6,672 km^{2} (2,576 sq mi)	102	Map of Romania highlighting Cluj County
Coat of arms of Constanța County	Constanța	Constanța	county seat	South-East	CT	90	41	RO223	655,997	7,104 km^{2} (2,743 sq mi)	92	Map of Romania highlighting Constanța County
Coat of arms of Covasna County	Covasna	Sfântu Gheorghe	Covasna River	Center	CV	52	67	RO123	200,042	3,707 km^{2} (1,431 sq mi)	54	Map of Romania highlighting Covasna County
Coat of arms of Dâmbovița County	Dâmbovița	Târgoviște	Dâmbovița River	South-Muntenia	DB	13	45	RO313	479,404	4,056 km^{2} (1,566 sq mi)	118	Map of Romania highlighting Dâmbovița County
Coat of arms of Dolj County	Dolj	Craiova	Jiu River (Note: Dolj is a shortened form of Dolu (Slavic for "valley") Jiu, in reference to the county's location in the lower part of Jiu river.)	South-West Oltenia	DJ	20	51	RO411	599,442	7,425 km^{2} (2,867 sq mi)	81	Map of Romania highlighting Dolj County
Coat of arms of Galați County	Galați	Galați	county seat	South-East	GL	80	36	RO224	496,892	4,465 km^{2} (1,724 sq mi)	111	Map of Romania highlighting Galați County
Coat of arms of Giurgiu County	Giurgiu	Giurgiu	county seat	South-Muntenia	GR	08	46	RO314	262,066	3,544 km^{2} (1,368 sq mi)	74	Map of Romania highlighting Giurgiu County
Coat of arms of Gorj County	Gorj	Târgu Jiu	Jiu River (Note: Gorj is a shortened form of Gora (Slavic for "mountain") Jiu, in reference to the county's location in the upper part of Jiu river.)	South-West Oltenia	GJ	21	53	RO412	314,684	5,572 km^{2} (2,151 sq mi)	56	Map of Romania highlighting Gorj County
Coat of arms of Harghita County	Harghita	Miercurea Ciuc	Harghita Mountains	Center	HR	53	66	RO124	291,950	6,637 km^{2} (2,563 sq mi)	44	Map of Romania highlighting Harghita County
Coat of arms of Hunedoara County	Hunedoara	Deva	Hunedoara city	West	HD	33	54	RO423	361,657	7,072 km^{2} (2,731 sq mi)	51	Map of Romania highlighting Hunedoara County
Coat of arms of Ialomița County	Ialomița	Slobozia	Ialomița River	South-Muntenia	IL	92	43	RO315	250,816	4,455 km^{2} (1,720 sq mi)	56	Map of Romania highlighting Ialomița County
Coat of arms of Iași County	Iași	Iași	county seat	North-East	IS	70	32	RO213	760,774	5,477 km^{2} (2,115 sq mi)	139	Map of Romania highlighting Iași County
Coat of arms of Ilfov County	Ilfov	Bucharest	Ilfov River	Bucharest-Ilfov	IF	07	1x	RO322	542,686	1,564 km^{2} (604 sq mi)	347	Map of Romania highlighting Ilfov County
Coat of arms of Maramureș County	Maramureș	Baia Mare	Maramureș historical region	North-West	MM	43	62	RO114	452,475	6,303 km^{2} (2,434 sq mi)	72	Map of Romania highlighting Maramureș County
Coat of arms of Mehedinți County	Mehedinți	Drobeta-Turnu Severin	Mehadia commune	South-West Oltenia	MH	22	52	RO413	234,339	4,942 km^{2} (1,908 sq mi)	47	Map of Romania highlighting Mehedinți County
Coat of arms of Mureș County	Mureș	Târgu Mureș	Mureș River	Center	MS	54	65	RO125	518,193	6,705 km^{2} (2,589 sq mi)	77	Map of Romania highlighting Mureș County
Coat of arms of Neamț County	Neamț	Piatra Neamț	Neamț River	North-East	NT	61	33	RO214	454,203	5,897 km^{2} (2,277 sq mi)	77	Map of Romania highlighting Neamț County
Coat of arms of Olt County	Olt	Slatina	Olt River	South-West Oltenia	OT	23	49	RO414	383,280	5,503 km^{2} (2,125 sq mi)	70	Map of Romania highlighting Olt County
Coat of arms of Prahova County	Prahova	Ploiești	Prahova River	South-Muntenia	PH	10	44	RO316	695,117	4,715 km^{2} (1,820 sq mi)	147	Map of Romania highlighting Prahova County
Coat of arms of Satu Mare County	Satu Mare	Satu Mare	county seat	North-West	SM	44	61	RO115	330,668	4,420 km^{2} (1,710 sq mi)	75	Map of Romania highlighting Satu Mare County
Coat of arms of Sălaj County	Sălaj	Zalău	Sălaj River	North-West	SJ	45	60	RO116	212,224	3,867 km^{2} (1,493 sq mi)	55	Map of Romania highlighting Sălaj County
Coat of arms of Sibiu County	Sibiu	Sibiu	county seat	Center	SB	55	69	RO126	388,325	5,432 km^{2} (2,097 sq mi)	71	Map of Romania highlighting Sibiu County
Coat of arms of Suceava County	Suceava	Suceava	Suceava River	North-East	SV	72	30	RO215	642,551	8,553 km^{2} (3,302 sq mi)	75	Map of Romania highlighting Suceava County
Coat of arms of Teleorman County	Teleorman	Alexandria	Teleorman River	South-Muntenia	TR	14	47	RO317	323,544	5,788 km^{2} (2,235 sq mi)	56	Map of Romania highlighting Teleorman County
Coat of arms of Timiș County	Timiș	Timișoara	Timiș River	West	TM	30	56	RO424	650,533	8,692 km^{2} (3,356 sq mi)	75	Map of Romania highlighting Timiș County
Coat of arms of Tulcea County	Tulcea	Tulcea	county seat	South-East	TL	82	40	RO225	193,355	8,484 km^{2} (3,276 sq mi)	23	Map of Romania highlighting Tulcea County
Coat of arms of Vaslui County	Vaslui	Vaslui	Vaslui River	North-East	VS	73	35	RO216	374,700	5,317 km^{2} (2,053 sq mi)	70	Map of Romania highlighting Vaslui County
Coat of arms of Vâlcea County	Vâlcea	Râmnicu Vâlcea	medieval county of Vîlcea (Note: Vâlcea is the Romanian word for a narrow valley.)	South-West Oltenia	VL	24	50	RO415	341,861	5,764 km^{2} (2,225 sq mi)	59	Map of Romania highlighting Vâlcea County
Coat of arms of Vrancea County	Vrancea	Focșani	medieval county of Vrancha (Note: Vran is a substratum word believed to mean "forest" or "mountain".)	South-East	VN	62	37	RO226	335,312	4,854 km^{2} (1,874 sq mi)	69	Map of Romania highlighting Vrancea County

== See also ==
- Communes of Romania
- Development regions of Romania
- List of Romania county name etymologies
- Former administrative divisions of Romania
- List of Romanian counties by population
- List of Romanian counties by GDP
- List of cities and towns in Romania
- List of Romanian counties by foreign trade
- Municipiu
