= Administrative divisions of Romania =

Romania's administration is relatively centralized and administrative subdivisions are therefore fairly simplified.

According to the Constitution of Romania, its territory is organized administratively into communes, cities and counties:

- At the county level: 41 counties, and one city with special status (Bucharest, the national capital)
- At the town / commune level: 103 municipalities and 217 other cities (for urban areas), and 2,861 communes (for rural areas). Municipality (municipiu) status is accorded to larger towns, but it does not give their administrations any greater powers.

Below communal or town level, there are no further formal administrative subdivisions. However, communes are divided into villages (which have no administration of their own). There are 12,957 villages in Romania. The only exception is Bucharest, which has six sectors, each with an administration of its own.

== Historic ==
Territorial evolution of Romania, 1859-present (animated map)

Divisions of Wallachia, 1601–1718

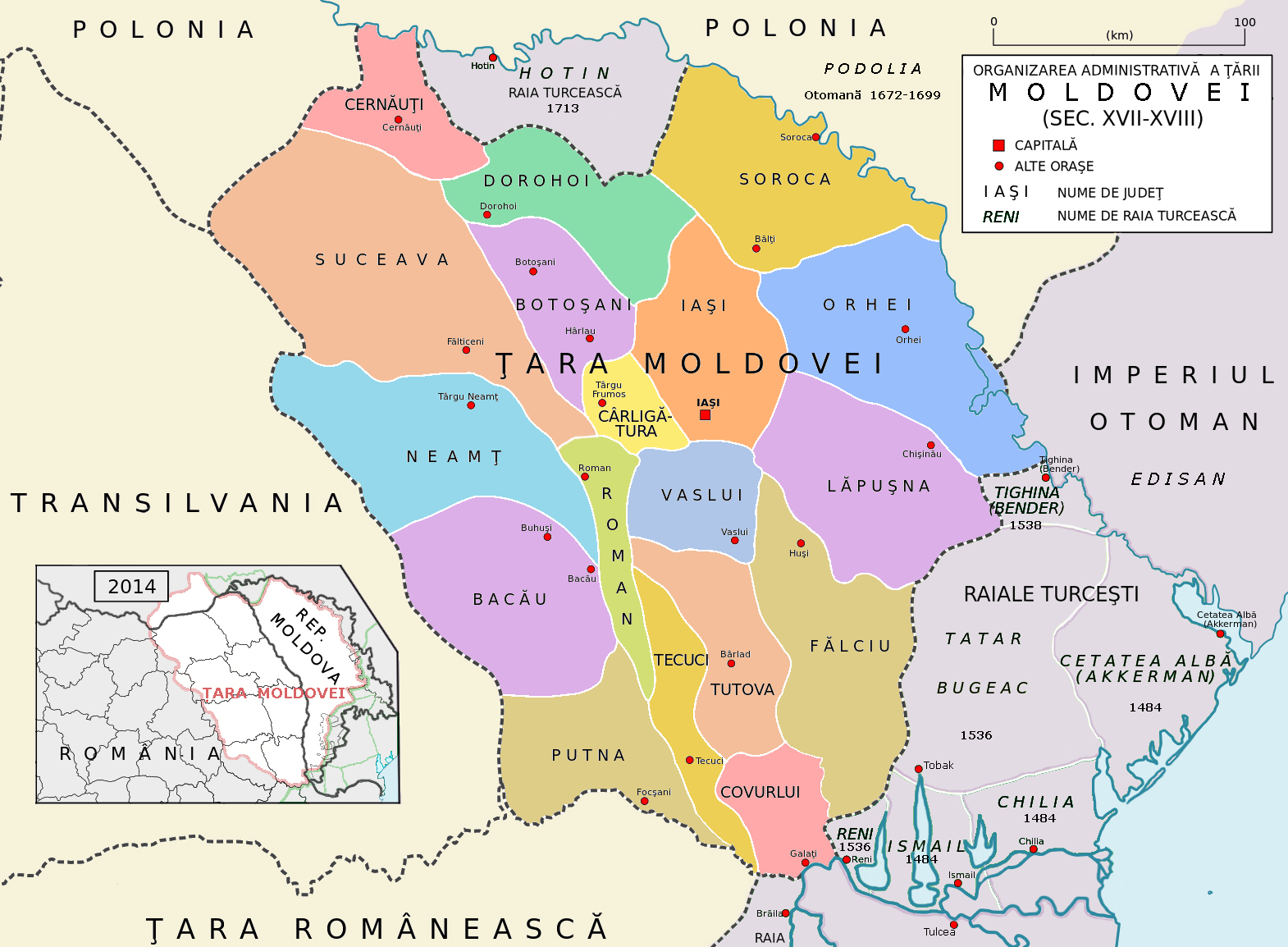
Divisions of Moldavia, 1601–1718

Divisions of Transylvania, 1606–1660

The earliest organization into județe of the Principalities of Wallachia and ținuturi of Moldavia dates back at least to the early 15th century. Each județ was ruled by a jude and each ținut by a pârcălab; both were officially appointed persons who had administrative and judicial functions in a manner inspired from the organization of the late Byzantine Empire. Transylvania, when it was part of the historic Kingdom of Hungary (in the Middle Ages), an independent Principality or a Habsburg domain (in the modern era until World War I) was divided into royal counties (Latin: comitatus), headed by comes (royal counts) with administrative and judicial functions. The term județ became used in Romanian universally for all principalities from the mid-19th century.

Counties of Romania, 1864-1878

Counties of Romania, 1878–1913

After modern Romania was formed in 1859 through the union of Wallachia and rump Moldavia, and then extended in 1918 through the union of Transylvania, as well as Bukovina and Bessarabia (parts of Moldavia temporarily acquired by, respectively, the Habsburgs, 1775–1918, and the Russian Tsars, 1812–1917), the administrative division was modernized using the French departments system as an example. With the exception of the half of the Communist period, this system remained in place. Since 1864, for each județ there exists a prefect (from the Latin praefectus), a subordinate of the Ministry of Internal Affairs, who is the representative of the government in the county, and the head of the local administration in the areas not delegated to local authorities. Until 1948, each județ was further divided into a number of plăși (singular plasă), with each administered by a pretor (from the Latin praetor), appointed by the prefect.

In 1913, as a result of the Second Balkan War, Romania acquired Southern Dobruja from Bulgaria, integrating this historical region within Romania's borders until 1940. In 1923 Romania adopted a new Constitution, and in 1927 it uniformized the traditional administrative systems of Transylvania, Bukovina and Bessarabia with that of the Romanian Old Kingdom. County borders were kept largely intact, with only a couple minor adjustments, as a total of 71 județe existed between 1927 and 1938.

In 1938, King Carol II modified the Constitution, and after that the law of administration of the Romanian territory. Ten ținuturi (meaning approximately "lands") were created, ruled by Rezidenți Regali (approximately "Royal Residents"), appointed directly by the monarch. The ținuturi represented another layer of administration between counties and the country; county borders were not erased. But, due to World War II, the Second Vienna Award, the Ribbentrop-Molotov pact and the loss of territory that Romania suffered, this style of administration did not last, the administration at the județ level being reintroduced back until the establishment of communism in 1945–1947.

During World War II, the territory of Romania suffered very significant modifications. In 1940, Soviet Union occupied Bessarabia, Northern Bukovina, and Hertsa region, which, after the fall of the Soviet Union in 1991, would become part of Republic of Moldova and of Ukraine. Between 1941 and 1944, these territories, together with Transnistria, were administered by Romania briefly, as the country was governed by a military dictatorship allied with Nazi Germany. Transnistria consisted of formerly proper Soviet territory between the Dniester and Southern Bug rivers. Nowadays, most of it is in Ukraine, with small parts in the Republic of Moldova (currently the unrecognised state of Transnistria). This territory, kept under Romanian military occupation and not annexed to Romania, consisted of a further 13 counties.

Current counties imposed over the inter-war counties

After the war, the Communist Party took over the administration of the country. In 1950, the party changed the administration model to the Russian model (regions and raions), but it reverted to the current system in 1968, although county borders were quite different from the interwar period. In 1981 the former counties of Ilfov and Ialomița were re-organised into the present-day counties of Giurgiu, Călărași, Ialomița and Ilfov. The county borders introduced in 1968 are largely in place, but administrative reform during the 1990s has devolved the functions of different authorities in line with transition from a totalitarian communist system to a modern democracy. The only territorial adjustment after 1989 occurred in 1995, when Ilfov County was formed. Before that it was a dependency of the Municipality of Bucharest (Sectorul Agricol Ilfov).

== Current status ==
NUTS 1 regions of Romania

NUTS 2 regions of Romania

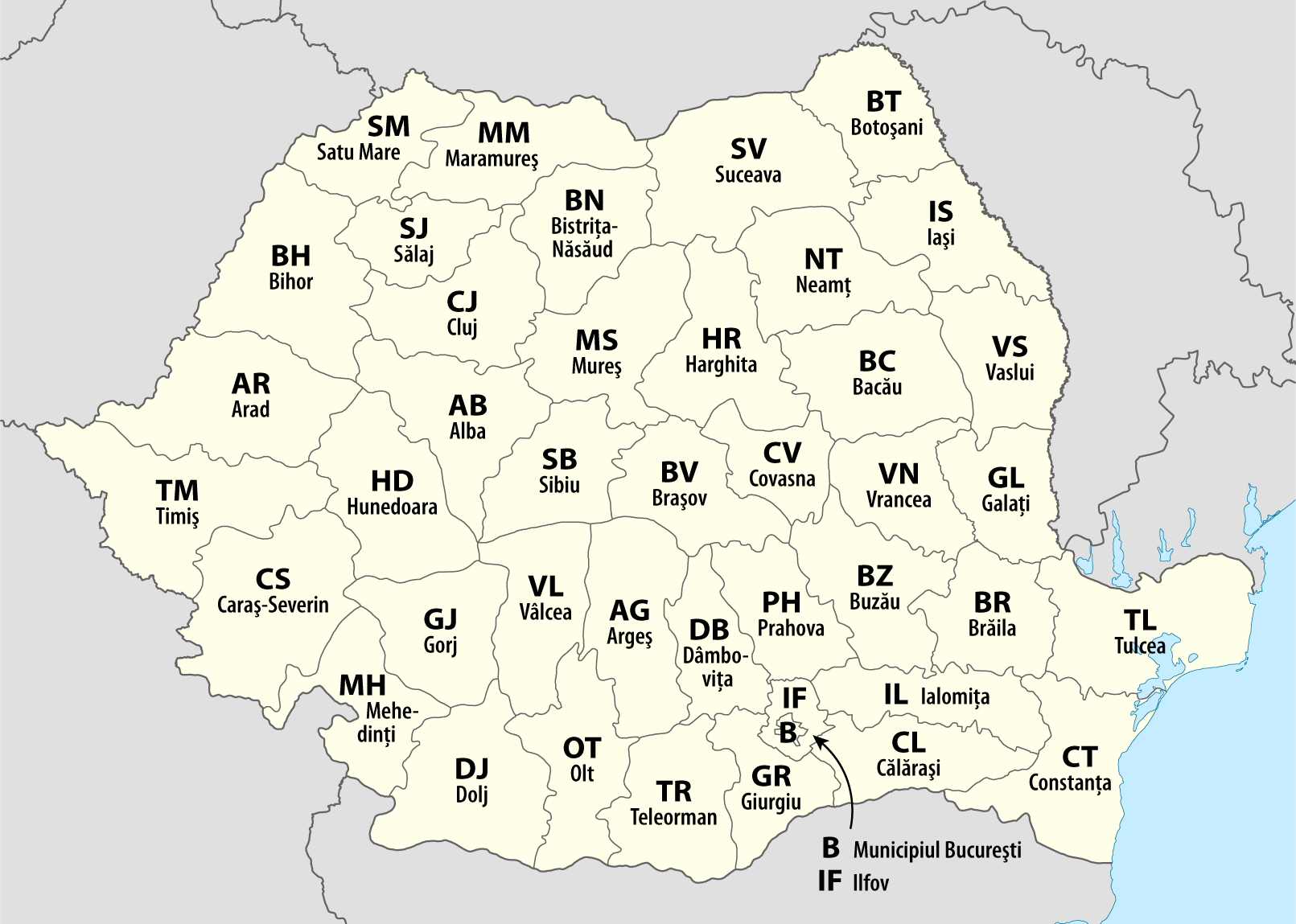
NUTS 3 regions of Romania

Eight regional divisions (called development regions) were created in 1998 in order to better co-ordinate regional development as Romania progressed towards accession to the European Union, and consist of several counties each. These correspond to NUTS II-level divisions in European Union member states, but do not actually have an administrative status and do not have a legislative or executive council or government. As of 2009, Romania is divided into 41 counties and one municipality which are assigned as NUTS III-level divisions. Currently, Romania has no NUTS-4 units, the counties being composed directly of cities (some of which with municipality status) and communes.

As in all modern democracies, the political power in Romania is divided into three independent branches: legislative, executive, and judicial. The prefect and his administration have only executive prerogatives. However, the territorial districts of the Romanian judicial system overlap with county borders, thus avoiding further complication. At the same time with local elections (of mayors and councilors for the cities and communes), a Consiliu județean (County Council) is elected for each county. From 2008 to 2016 a President of the County Council was also elected by direct vote. Beginning in 2016, the president is (as prior to 2008) elected by a Council. As of now, the legislative powers of county councils are quite reduced, but there are plans for more decentralization. (These plans, however, call for introduction of Regional Councils for the 8 development regions of the NUTS-2 level.)

== Future developments ==
As of 2010 there have been several proposals for the administrative reorganization of Romania made by the presidential commission tasked with the analysis of the political and constitutional regime. Most of these recommendations aim for the partial reestablishment of the counties in their pre-1950 form. The counties will be grouped into several regions (9 to 15) based on common historical and economic characteristics (NUTS II level). The regions will be in their turn clustered into 4–6 macroregions (NUTS I level). Furthermore, a NUTS IV level division, called plasă or canton will probably be added in order to meet the EU statistical and administrative requirements.

Another proposal, based on 15 autonomous euro-regions (amongst them one ethnic based region with a consistent Hungarian majority made of the existing Mureș, Harghita and Covasna counties) grouped into 5 statistical macroregions (NUTS I), was made by the Democratic Union of Hungarians in Romania (UDMR).

== Nomenclature of Territorial Units for Statistics (NUTS) ==
For statistical and development purposes, Romania, in the NUTS scheme, is divided into:

- NUTS I level: 4 macroregions (macroregiune in Romanian), used for appropriation of European development funds
- NUTS II level: 8 development regions, with an average population of 2.8 million inhabitants per region, although not administrative divisions per se, have been used for decades for statistical purposes by the Romanian National Commission of Statistics (NCS). Recently they also exist to co-ordinate regional development and appropriation of European development funds
- NUTS III level: 41 counties and one municipality (Bucharest, the national capital) reflecting Romania's official administrative-territorial structure
- LAU I level: not used, as territorial units associations have not been identified yet;
- LAU II level: 217 cities and 103 municipalities (for urban areas), and 2,856 communes (for rural areas)

An exception to this structure is the Municipality of Bucharest, which is a secondary division (rather than a tertiary division like other municipalities) and is officially divided into six sectors, each sector having a local government and council.

The eight development regions (specific territorial entities without administrative status or legal personality) represent the framework for collecting specific statistical data, according to the European regulations issued by Eurostat for the Nomenclature of Territorial Units for Statistics (NUTS) II territorial level. According to the Emergency Government Ordinance No 75/2001 on the functioning of the National Institute for Statistics, eight Directorates General for regional statistics have been created, and together with the 34 county directorates for statistics, aim at developing regional statistics. Officially, the eight regions are Nord-Est (North-East), Sud-Est (South-East), Sud - Muntenia (South - Muntenia), Sud-Vest Oltenia (South-West Oltenia), Vest (West), Nord-Vest (North-West), Centru (Centre), and București - Ilfov (Bucharest - Ilfov). The criteria used by NCS for delimiting the regions is a combination of geographical location and homogeneity based on population density. Alternative historical names are also used, but remain unofficial.

No	Type	Name	Area, km^{2}	Population (2021 census)	Municipalities	Other cities	Communes	Villages
1	Nord-Est (development region)		36,850	3,226,436	17	29	506	2,414'
1	county	Bacău County	6,621	601,387	3	5	85	491
2	county	Botoșani County	4,986	392,821	2	5	71	333
3	county	Iași County	5,476	760,774	2	3	93	418
4	county	Neamț County	5,896	454,203	2	3	78	344
5	county	Suceava County	8,553	642,551	5	11	98	379
6	county	Vaslui County	5,318	374,700	3	2	81	449
2	Sud-Est (development region)		35,762	2,367,987	11	24	355	1,448
7	county	Brăila County	4,766	281,452	1	3	40	140
8	county	Buzău County	6,103	404,979	2	3	82	475
9	county	Constanța County	7,071	655,997	3	9	58	189
10	county	Galați County	4,466	496,892	2	2	61	180
11	county	Tulcea County	8,499	193,355	1	4	46	133
12	county	Vrancea County	4,857	335,312	2	3	68	331
3	Sud – Muntenia		34,453	2,864,339	16	32	519	2,019
13	county	Argeș County	6,826	569,932	3	4	95	576
14	county	Călărași County	5,088	283,458	2	3	50	160
15	county	Dâmbovița County	4,054	479,404	2	5	82	353
16	county	Giurgiu County	3,526	262,066	1	2	51	167
17	county	Ialomița County	4,453	250,816	3	4	59	127
18	county	Prahova County	4,716	695,119	2	12	90	405
19	county	Teleorman County	5,790	323,544	3	2	92	231
4	Sud-Vest Oltenia		29,212	1,873,607	11	29	408	2,070
20	county	Dolj County	7,414	599,442	3	4	104	378
21	county	Gorj County	5,602	314,685	2	7	61	411
22	county	Mehedinți County	4,933	234,339	2	3	61	344
23	county	Olt County	5,498	383,280	2	6	104	377
24	county	Vâlcea County	5,765	341,861	2	9	78	560
5	Vest (development region)		32,034	1,668,921	12	30	281	1,327
25	county	Arad County	7,754	410,143	1	9	68	270
26	county	Caraș-Severin County	8,520	246,588	2	6	69	287
27	county	Hunedoara County	7,063	361,657	7	7	55	457
28	county	Timiș County	8,697	650,533	2	8	89	313
6	Nord-Vest (development region)		34,159	2,521,793	15	28	403	1,800
29	county	Bihor County	7,544	551,297	4	6	91	430
30	county	Bistrița-Năsăud County	5,355	295,988	1	3	58	235
31	county	Cluj County	6,674	679,141	5	1	75	420
32	county	Maramureș County	6,304	452,475	2	11	63	214
33	county	Satu Mare County	4,418	330,668	2	4	59	220
34	county	Sălaj County	3,864	212,224	1	3	57	281
7	Centru (development region)		34,100	2,271,067	20	37	357	1,788
35	county	Alba County	6,242	325,941	4	7	67	656
36	county	Brașov County	5,363	546,615	4	6	48	149
37	county	Covasna County	3,710	200,042	2	3	40	122
38	county	Harghita County	6,639	291,950	4	5	58	235
39	county	Mureș County	6,714	518,193	4	7	91	464
40	county	Sibiu County	5,432	388,326	2	9	53	162
8	București-Ilfov		1,821	2,259,665	1	8	32	91
41	county	Ilfov County	1,583	542,704	-	8	32	91
42	municipality	Bucharest	238	1,716,961	1	-	-	-
Total			238,391	19,053,815	103	217	2,861	12,957

== See also ==
- Territorial evolution of Romania
