= Sud-Vest (development region) =

Sud-Vest Oltenia South-West Oltenia
- Region
- Country: Romania
- Statistical region: Macroregiunea Patru

Area
  - Total: 29,211.7 km^{2} (11,278.7 sq mi)
  - Rank: 7th

Population (2024)
  - Total: 1,855,697
  - Rank: 7th
  - Density: 63.5258/km^{2} (164.531/sq mi)

Ethnic groups
  - Romanians: 97.2%
  - Romani: 2.6%

GDP
  - Total: €25.048 billion (2023)
- Time zone: UTC+2 (EET)
  - Summer (DST): UTC+3 (EEST)
- NUTS code: RO41
- HDI (2022): 0.806 very high · 5th
- Website: www.adroltenia.ro

Sud-Vest Oltenia or South-West Oltenia is a subdivision of Romania. It is one of the eight development regions and NUTS-2 statistical regions as defined under the Nomenclature of Territorial Units for Statistics (NUTS). Along with the Vest region, it forms part of the NUTS-1 region of Macroregiunea Patru (Macroregion four). It encompasses an area of 29,211.7 km^{2} (11,278.7 sq mi) in the south-west portion of the country, and incorporates five counties–Dolj, Gorj, Mehedinți, Olt, and Vâlcea. As per 2024 estimate, the region had a population of 1.86 million, making it the second lowest populated amongst the regions of Romania.

== Classification ==
The country of Romania is organized into eight development regions. These development regions do not have any administrative powers, and its main function is to coordinate regional development projects and manage funds from the European Union. The Nomenclature of Territorial Units for Statistics (NUTS) organizes the country into four broader level statistical regions. These are classified as a NUTS-1 statistical regions of Romania, and incorporate one or more development regions within it. The regions form the NUTS-2 territorial units under them.

== Geography ==
Sud-Vest Oltenia incorporates the south-western parts of the country encompassing an area of 29,211.7 km^{2} (11,278.7 sq mi). The region is located in South Eastern Europe, and is completely land locked. It shares international land borders with Serbia in the west, and Bulagaria in the south. It is bordered by South Romania on the east, and Western and Central Romania in the north. The Danube River forms a rough natural boundary between the region and the neighboring country of Bulgaria. South-West Romania consists of a mix of mountainous regions and plains. The Southern Carpathians and Banat Mountains dominate the north and north west portion of the region. The central and southern region consists of the Danube floodplains. The region is about 30% forested, with the forest cover reducing by over five percent in the previous century.

=== Sub-regions ===
South Western Romania incorporates five counties–Dolj, Gorj, Mehedinți, Olt, and Vâlcea.

Sub-divisions
County	Coat of Arms	NUTS code	ISO Code	Seat	Area	Population (2021)	Map
Dolj	Coat of arms of Dolj County	RO411	DJ	Craiova	7,414 km^{2} (2,863 sq mi)	599,442	Map of Romania highlighting Dolj County
Gorj	Coat of arms of Gorj County	RO412	GJ	Târgu Jiu	5,601.7 km^{2} (2,162.8 sq mi)	314,685	Map of Romania highlighting Gorj County
Mehedinți	Coat of arms of Mehedinți County	RO413	MH	Drobeta-Turnu Severin	4,932.9 km^{2} (1,904.6 sq mi)	234,339	Map of Romania highlighting Mehedinti County
Olt	Coat of arms of Olt County	RO414	OT	Slatina	5,498.3 km^{2} (2,122.9 sq mi)	383,280	Map of Romania highlighting Olt County
Vâlcea	Coat of arms of Vâlcea County	RO415	VL	Râmnicu Vâlcea	5,764.8 km^{2} (2,225.8 sq mi)	341,861	Map of Romania highlighting Vâlcea County
Sud-Vest		RO41	SV	Craiova	29,211.7 km^{2} (11,278.7 sq mi)	1,873,607	

== Demographics ==
South-West Romania had a population of over 1.85 million in 2024, and is the second least populated of the eight development regions of the country after West Romania. Though the region has a high Human Development Index, it is amongst the poorly developed regions in the European Union. Majority of the population (about 10.2 million) lived in rural areas.

== See also ==
- Development regions of Romania
- Nomenclature of Territorial Units for Statistics
