= Centru =

Centru may refer to:

- Sectorul Centru, Chișinău, Moldova
- Centru (development region), Romania
- Centru, Cluj-Napoca, Romania
