= Macroregiunea Unu =

Coordinates: 46°46′N 23°35′E

Macroregion One Macroregiunea Unu (in Romanian)
- Region
- Country: Romania

Area
  - Total: 68,241 km^{2} (26,348 sq mi)

Population (2021 census)
  - Total: 4,792,860
  - Density: 70.234/km^{2} (181.91/sq mi)

GDP
  - Total: €74.014 billion (2023)
- Time zone: UTC+2 (EET)
  - Summer (DST): UTC+3 (EEST)

Macroregion One (Romanian: Macroregiunea Unu) is a statistical (NUTS 1) region of Romania. It consists of two development regions (Northwest and Center), twelve counties, respectively.

== Geography ==
=== Climate ===
Thermal regime for Cluj-Napoca

Climate chart (precipitation, max. and min. temperature)
J	F	M	A	M	J	J	A	S	O	N	D
20 0 −7	20 3 −5	20 10 −1	40 15 4	70 20 9	80 23 11	80 25 13	70 24 12	40 21 9	40 15 4	30 6 −1	20 2 −4
- █ Average max. and min. temperatures in °C
- █ Precipitation totals in mm
- Source: Hong Kong Observatory
Imperial conversion
J	F	M	A	M	J	J	A	S	O	N	D
0.8 33 20	0.8 38 24	0.8 50 31	1.6 59 39	2.8 69 47	3.1 73 52	3.1 76 55	2.8 76 54	1.6 69 48	1.6 58 39	1.2 43 31	0.8 35 24
- █ Average max. and min. temperatures in °F
- █ Precipitation totals in inches

Due to geographical position, climate expresses the natural setting of the relief, region benefiting from a temperate continental climate with warm summers, cold winters, high precipitation, with small differences between mountain, plain and hilly areas. In the village of Bod (Brașov County), was recorded the absolute minimum temperature (−38.5 °C), on January 25, 1942.
