= ISO 3166-2:RO =

Entry for Romania in ISO 3166-2

ISO 3166-2:RO is the entry for Romania in ISO 3166-2, part of the ISO 3166 standard published by the International Organization for Standardization (ISO), which defines codes for the names of the principal subdivisions (e.g., provinces or states) of all countries coded in ISO 3166-1.

Currently for Romania, ISO 3166-2 codes are defined for 41 departments and one municipality. The municipality Bucharest is the capital of the country and has special status equal to the departments.

Each code consists of two parts, separated by a hyphen. The first part is RO, the ISO 3166-1 alpha-2 code of Romania. The second part is either of the following:

- one letter: municipality
- two letters: departments

The letters are currently used in vehicle registration plates.

== Current codes ==
Subdivision names are listed as in the ISO 3166-2 standard published by the ISO 3166 Maintenance Agency (ISO 3166/MA).

Subdivision names are sorted in Romanian alphabetical order: a, ă, â, b-i, î, j-s, ș, t, ț, u-z.

Click on the button in the header to sort each column.

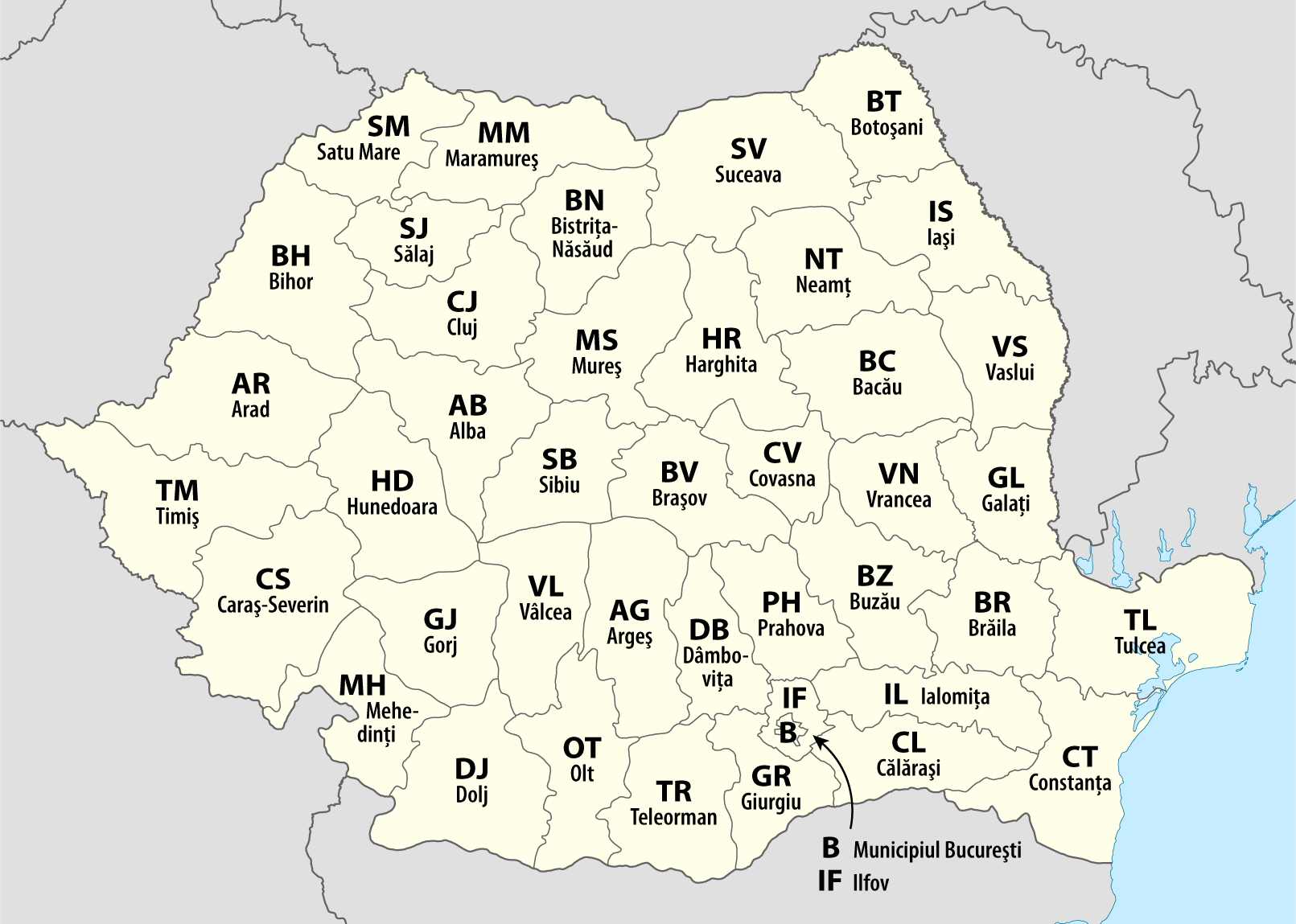
Map of Romania with each department and the municipality Bucharest labelled with the second part of its ISO 3166-2 code.

Code	Subdivision name (ro)	Subdivision category
RO-AB	Alba	department
RO-AR	Arad	department
RO-AG	Argeș	department
RO-BC	Bacău	department
RO-BH	Bihor	department
RO-BN	Bistrița-Năsăud	department
RO-BT	Botoșani	department
RO-BV	Brașov	department
RO-BR	Brăila	department
RO-B	București	municipality
RO-BZ	Buzău	department
RO-CS	Caraș-Severin	department
RO-CL	Călărași	department
RO-CJ	Cluj	department
RO-CT	Constanța	department
RO-CV	Covasna	department
RO-DB	Dâmbovița	department
RO-DJ	Dolj	department
RO-GL	Galați	department
RO-GR	Giurgiu	department
RO-GJ	Gorj	department
RO-HR	Harghita	department
RO-HD	Hunedoara	department
RO-IL	Ialomița	department
RO-IS	Iași	department
RO-IF	Ilfov	department
RO-MM	Maramureș	department
RO-MH	Mehedinți	department
RO-MS	Mureș	department
RO-NT	Neamț	department
RO-OT	Olt	department
RO-PH	Prahova	department
RO-SM	Satu Mare	department
RO-SJ	Sălaj	department
RO-SB	Sibiu	department
RO-SV	Suceava	department
RO-TR	Teleorman	department
RO-TM	Timiș	department
RO-TL	Tulcea	department
RO-VS	Vaslui	department
RO-VL	Vâlcea	department
RO-VN	Vrancea	department

== Changes ==
The following changes to the entry have been announced in newsletters by the ISO 3166/MA since the first publication of ISO 3166-2 in 1998:

Newsletter	Date issued	Description of change in newsletter	Code/Subdivision change
Newsletter I-1	2000-06-21	Correction of spelling mistake of subdivision category in header	
Newsletter I-4	2002-12-10	Addition of one department. Subdivision categories in header re-sorted	Subdivisions added: RO-IF Ilfov

== See also ==
- FIPS region codes of Romania
- Neighbouring countries: BG, HU, MD, RS, UA
- NUTS codes of Romania
- Subdivisions of Romania
