= Territorial evolution of Romania =

Territorial changes of Romania ever since the unification of Moldavia and Wallachia (1859–2010)

The territorial evolution of Romania (Romanian: Evoluția teritorială a României) includes all the changes in the country's borders from its formation to the present day. The precedents of Romania as an independent state can be traced back to the 14th century, when the principalities of Moldavia and Wallachia were founded. Wallachia during its history lost several portions of its territory, either to the Ottomans or the Habsburgs. However, this land would be later essentially recovered in its entirety. Moldavia, on the other hand, suffered great territorial losses. In 1774, the Habsburgs invaded Bukovina and annexed it one year later, and in 1812, the Russian Empire took control of Bessarabia. Both territories were later exposed to powerful colonization policies. The principalities declared unification in 1859 as the Principality of Romania. This new state sought independence from the Ottoman Empire's vassalage, and in 1878, it fought a war against it alongside Russia. However, the latter would annex Southern Bessarabia, which was recovered decades before. Romania received Northern Dobruja as compensation, and would wage a war for the southern part against Bulgaria in 1913.

The now kingdom of Romania had great territorial ambitions which, once they were promised by the Entente, dragged Romania to World War I in 1916. Initially, it suffered a defeat leading to the loss of its Carpathian mountain passes and Dobruja in 1918. During this period, the union of Bessarabia with Romania was achieved. As the Central Powers weakened and pressure from the Entente (especially from France) increased, Romania reentered the war the same year. The Entente turned out to be the winner and Romania regained its lost territories after its initial defeat, as well as Bukovina and Transylvania. During this period, the country reached its maximum territorial extension, being known as Greater Romania.

However, Romania's neighbors were not satisfied with the new borders. Romania relied on regional alliances and protection from France and the United Kingdom at the west. However, soon Nazi Germany defeated France, causing great concern in the country. Since it was already apparent that the West could no longer protect Romania, the Soviet Union occupied Bessarabia, Northern Bukovina and the Hertsa region in 1940 after an ultimatum that Romania was forced to accept. The king, Carol II, was alarmed and sought the help of Germany to protect Romania's territory, but it forced the country to cede Northern Transylvania to Hungary and Southern Dobruja to Bulgaria. The king lost all his popularity, causing Ion Antonescu's rise to power. He officially joined Axis and demanded territories from Yugoslavia after its invasion, specifically Banat and the Timok Valley. This, however, never happened. In 1941, the Axis invaded the Soviet Union, allowing the recovery by Romania of its lost territories plus Transnistria, which was placed under military–civil administration. Nevertheless, this operation failed, and after the overthrow of Antonescu, Romania changed sides in 1944 and fought against the Axis, thus losing Bessarabia and Northern Bukovina once again to the Soviet Union. This made possible the recovery of Northern Transylvania by the country.

A communist government with Soviet backing was fully installed in the country in 1947. The Soviet Union had occupied several Romanian islands in the Danube Delta and the Black Sea, being this a territorial change which was made official in 1948. One of these islands was the Snake Island, which caused a dispute over the maritime borders between the now democratic Romania and Ukraine in 2009 in which Romania gained 80% of the disputed zone.

Nowadays, nationalists and other Romanian groups seek the territorial expansion of their country, especially through Bessarabia and Northern Bukovina.

== Background ==
The Principality of Moldavia at its greatest peak, including Pokuttya

The Principality of Romania appeared in 1859 after the unification of the principalities of Moldavia and Wallachia. However, these countries were founded in the 14th century, and their borders changed repeatedly throughout history. Wallachia, which had obtained Dobruja during the reign of Mircea the Elder, lost the territory to the Ottomans at the end of it (around 1418). In the same period, the Ottomans annexed two ports north of the Danube, Giurgiu and Turnu Măgurele. In the middle of the 16th century, Wallachia also lost the city of Brăila. During the year 1600, Michael the Brave, ruler of Wallachia, unified the three Romanian principalities (Wallachia, Moldavia and Transylvania), although this union would be dismembered shortly after. The Austro-Turkish War that ended in 1718 was won by the Austrian Habsburg monarchy, which, among other lands, annexed Oltenia (the western part of Wallachia). However, the Treaty of Belgrade of 1739 again yielded Oltenia to Wallachia. In 1826, as a result of the Akkerman Convention, Wallachia reclaimed the three ports north of the Danube, drawing the Ottoman-Wallachian border across the Danube again.

On the other hand, there is the principality of Moldavia. It emerged as a state after the defeat of the Tatars by the King of Hungary, Louis I. The area remained under Hungarian influence and was formally established as a Hungarian fiefdom in 1347 under Dragoș. He was succeeded by Sas, who would be defeated by Bogdan I finishing the Hungarian suzerainty over Moldavia and starting its independence. It is argued, however, that for most (or all) of his reign and on its aftermath, Moldavia remained a Hungarian vassal (or Hungarian-Polish during the union of both from 1370 to 1382). The first Moldavian territorial change would take place a few years later. In 1388, Władysław II Jagiełło wanted money to wage a war against the Teutonic Order, so he asked Petru II of Moldavia for a loan (4,000 rubles). Pokuttya was used as a pledge, and it was ceded to it. This loan was probably never paid. The territory would become a place of dispute between Poland and Moldavia for the next two centuries, and was finally lost by the latter one in 1531 after the Battle of Obertyn. Meanwhile, it lost the ports of Kiliya and Bilhorod-Dnistrovskyi in 1484 to the Ottomans, followed by the annexation of the entire Moldavian coast (Budjak) by them in 1538. In 1711, due to the strategic importance of the town of Khotyn and the area around it, the Ottomans annexed it from Moldavia, settled it with Lipka Tatars and made it a sanjak (a province). Bukovina would later be invaded by the Habsburgs in 1774 and annexed one year later, undertaking a strong process of Ukrainization. Moldavia's last major territorial loss took place in 1812. The Ottomans and the Russian Empire would wage a war between 1806 and 1812, which ended with the Treaty of Bucharest that ceded to the latter Bessarabia, the eastern part of the principality. This region, just like Bukovina, suffered severe Russian colonization. Nevertheless, following the Russian defeat in the Crimean War, Moldavia recovered Southern Bessarabia in 1856.

After the devastation of the Kingdom of Hungary at Ottoman hands and its subsequent partition, Transylvania also became its own nearly independent state which included not only the geographic region of Transylvania, but also parts of Banat and the "Western Parts" (Bereg, Crișana, Maramureș, parts of Szolnok, Ung and others; sometimes collectively known as Partium). However, the principality was not led by Romanians and it was conquered by the Habsburgs in 1699.

== History ==
=== Formation and independence ===
Map of Romania and its administrative divisions in 1864

In 1859, the principalities of Moldavia and Wallachia declared unification under a hereditary prince, in this case, Alexandru Ioan Cuza. Carol I was later elected as prince in 1866 after a referendum was approved. This new state was still an Ottoman vassal, and was not fully independent. Therefore, as "reluctant" allies, both Romania and Russia fought a war against the Ottoman Empire, which was defeated. However, in the aftermath, Russia attempted to retrieve Southern Bessarabia from Romania, which was repeatedly rejected. After a series of negotiations, Russia promised to respect Romania's territorial integrity with a treaty in 1877. This was broken just a year later, when Russian represented Romania in the Treaty of San Stefano of 1878, took Northern Dobruja and the Snake Island and offered it to Romania in exchange for Southern Bessarabia. This treaty was later revised by the Western powers in the Congress of Berlin, ending in the loss of Southern Bessarabia anyway. Thus, in 1878, Romania lost the territory but gained independence from the Ottomans and Northern Dobruja (including the Danube Delta).

During the negotiations, the Danubian island of Ada Kaleh was not discussed. Hungarian journalist Emil Lengyel declared "the island belonged to Turkey, but the peacemakers forgot about it at the Berlin Congress in 1878". According to the articles of this congress, the Danube had to be a neutral zone. Therefore, Austria-Hungary interpreted the island as being no man's land. Members of the Hungarian Parliament called for annexation of the island and contacted the Ottoman Empire to find out if they had their consent to do this, nevertheless the annexation was carried out in 1913. The island remained with Austro-Hungarian troops but also a Turkish civil administrator, a vague situation that would last for several decades. In 1881, the Kingdom of Romania was proclaimed.

The First Balkan War at the beginning of the 20th century presented an imbalance of the power in the region, as Austria-Hungary supported a powerful Bulgarian state and a weak and devastated Serbia. Romania did not support this, and after unfruitful negotiations, Romania joined the Second Balkan War in 1913 against Bulgaria. Ending in its victory, Romania gained Southern Dobruja, including Silistra, which was promised in 1878.

=== World War I ===
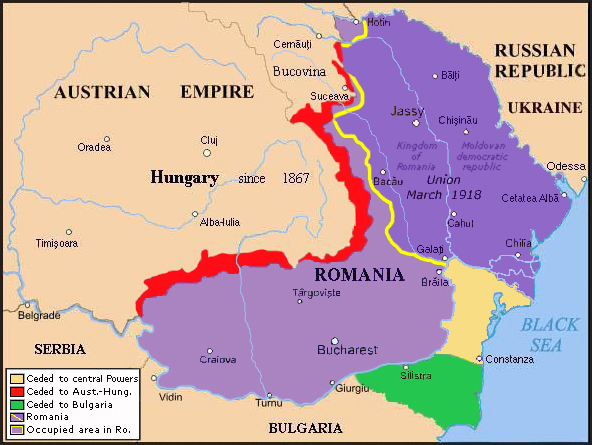
Romania after the Treaty of Bucharest of 1918

When World War I began in 1914, Romania initially maintained a policy of neutrality. However, after secret negotiations with the Triple Entente, the Treaty of Bucharest of 1916 was signed. This treaty promised Romania the regions of Transylvania, Bukovina, Banat and other Hungarian territories along the Tisza River (Crișana). Prime Minister Ion I. C. Brătianu, in charge of the Romanian foreign policy after Carol I's death in 1914, was highly suspicious of whether the Entente would deliver on its promises due to the event of Southern Bessarabia decades earlier. Therefore, he insisted on various clauses and conditions in the treaty to ensure that it would be fulfilled.

In August 1916, Romania entered the war and invaded Transylvania, but an attack by the Central Powers from the south ruined its actions. The Romanian army was courageous and enthusiastic, but it was poorly equipped and inexperienced. In December, the Central Powers had already occupied Wallachia and Dobruja. This raised doubts for the Entente as to whether Romanian claims had to be accomplished, and they did not invite Romania to participate in following conferences about the war. This changed after a visit to Moscow from Brătianu complaining about this and in which he convinced the Entente of the importance of Romania in the region. Eventually, the Russian army collapsed and Russia would be forced to abandon the war. Romania, although it had managed to repudiate an offensive towards Moldavia, was left alone on the Eastern Front and was now worried about the threat of the Russian revolutionary forces. Thus, it signed the Armistice of Focșani with the Central Powers on 9 December 1917. Meanwhile, Bessarabia, which had declared itself as the Moldavian Democratic Republic on 15 December, united with Romania on 9 April 1918. This was ratified by King Ferdinand I on 17 April.

Eventually Romania would end up signing a formal peace treaty with the Central Powers, the Treaty of Bucharest of 1918, almost three months after the Treaty of Brest-Litovsk with which Russia left the war. The conditions were harsh: Romania was to cede the Carpathian mountain passes to Austria-Hungary and Dobruja under the administration of the Central Powers (everything below Constanța was annexed by Bulgaria). Furthermore, Romania had to lease its oil fields to Germany for 90 years and almost unlimited rights to export grain and other Romanian raw materials. This left the country almost indefensible. As compensation, the Central Powers recognized the union of Bessarabia with Romania. However, Ferdinand I refused to ratify the treaty, which he could easily do due to the changes in the Western Front that distracted Germany.

In the autumn of 1918, the Austro-Hungarian Empire collapsed, making possible Romanian claims easier to fulfill. The Entente, and especially France, were seeking Romanian assistance to defeat the rest of the enemy troops in southeastern Europe and to cooperate with the pro-Allied Russian troops. The French general Henri Mathias Berthelot, who had left Romania 6 months earlier, was sent to Thessaloniki (Greece) to encourage it to rejoin the war from there. This was accomplished on November 10, when Romania declared war once again.

=== Interwar period ===
Greater Romania and its regions

The Romanians of Bukovina declared union with the country on 28 November and those of Transylvania on 1 December. During the Paris Peace Conference, Brătianu did everything possible to secure Romania's new borders. Transylvania was the most important topic for him, so much so that he sent the Romanian army to Hungary despite the prohibitions from the Supreme Council of the Allied powers. The Romanian offensive was successful and the Hungarian Soviet Republic was disbanded on 1 August 1919. After severe diplomatic pressure, Romania signed the Treaty of Neuilly-sur-Seine with Bulgaria on 27 November (leaving the border the same) and the Treaty of Saint-Germain-en-Laye with Austria and treaties regarding ethnic minorities on 9 December 1919. Romania did not receive all of Banat, but two thirds, almost everything else going to Kingdom of Serbs, Croats and Slovenes. The Treaty of Trianon signed on 4 June 1920 defined the border between Romania and Hungary, the former receiving all of Transylvania and other lands in eastern Hungary (parts of Crișana and Maramureș). Romanian diplomats had also claimed the island of Ada Kaleh to protect the port of Orșova, and Romania received it after the signing of the treaty. This was confirmed by Turkey in 1923 in the Treaty of Lausanne. Finally, the Supreme Council recognized Bessarabia's union with Romania without detailing too much, since it would leave the issue for negotiations between Romania and Russia. By the end of 1920, the Romanian borders were settled. Romania gained 156,000 square kilometres (60,000 square miles) (making a total area of 296,000 km^{2}, 114,000 mi^{2}) and 8,500,000 inhabitants (with a total of 16,250,000). The Romanian national ideal was fulfilled, thus appearing Greater Romania.

During the interwar period, Romania's greatest goal was to defend the country's new borders against the Soviet Union and Germany, as well as the revisionist Bulgaria and Hungary. Romanian politicians saw the United Kingdom and especially France as the defenders of peace that made this possible. The country also supported the establishment of the League of Nations and other regional alliances (Balkan Pact and Little Entente) to counter its enemies. However, Romania never managed to improve its relations with Hungary and the Soviet Union. The former insisted on the return of Transylvania, while the latter never accepted the loss of Bessarabia. Romanian leaders trusted the assumed hostility between Nazi Germany and the Soviet Union that maintained a balance of power. That is why the non-aggression pact signed on 23 August 1939 between the two shocked them, causing great insecurity in the country. In addition, under the secret terms of the pact, Nazi Germany had already recognized the Soviet interest in Bessarabia.

=== World War II ===
Romania after the territorial losses of 1940

World War II began in September 1939, and the German victory on the Western Front and the subsequent defeat of France in June 1940 seriously alarmed the King of Romania Carol II. He was convinced that the allies could no longer defend Romania, so he decided that the only way to keep the country together was by relying on Germany. However, this did not prevent the Soviet ultimatum of 26 June 1940. In it, the cession within 24 hours of Bessarabia was ordered, as well as Northern Bukovina as compensation for the "suffering of the Bessarabians under Romanian rule". In the ultimatum it was said that Bessarabia was "for the most part (ethnically) Ukrainian" and that Northern Bukovina was "linked to Soviet Ukraine". Further, the map of the ultimatum was drawn with a red thick pencil that allowed the Soviet Union to also occupy the Hertsa region even if it was not mentioned in the text. Since the Allies had fallen and Germany and Italy were urging him to accept the claims, Carol II accepted the ultimatum. Thus, on 28 June, the Soviet Union occupied the mentioned territories.

After this, Carol II desperately tried to integrate with Adolf Hitler's Germany as quickly as possible to avoid claims from Bulgaria and Hungary. On 4 July, he brought in a pro-German government that immediately declared Romanian withdrawal from the League of Nations and adhesion to the Axis powers. Carol II also called for Germany to respect Romanian borders and cooperation between the armies of both countries, but Hitler stated that this would only be possible after resolving territorial disputes with its neighbors. The Transylvania dispute was difficult to negotiate, with the Romanian public completely opposed to its ceding. Negotiations with Hungary started on 16 August did not reach an agreement, and Hitler decided to resolve the dispute. He saw it necessary to somewhat satisfy Hungary and not cripple Romania, but also to keep both of them dissatisfied to ensure their cooperation with Germany. In Vienna, Hitler showed his proposal and gave the option to either accept or fight with Axis-backed Hungary. Following a Crown Council on 30 August, the Second Vienna Award was accepted and Hungary was given Northern Transylvania. Further, after negotiations, the Treaty of Craiova that returned Southern Dobruja to Bulgaria was signed on 7 September. Romania lost a third of its territory (99,790 km^{2}, 38,530 mi^{2}) and population (6,161,317 inhabitants).

Carol II thus lost all his prestige, and upon reflection, he chose General Ion Antonescu to rule the country. He was an authoritarian nationalist with links to the Iron Guard who did not even favor Germany. He demanded the abdication and flight of Carol II from the country, which he did on 7 September. His son Michael I, now King, issued a decree the same day and he made Antonescu leader (Conducător) of Romania and gave him full powers. The Italian failure in Greece and worsening German-Soviet relations increased Hitler's trust towards Romania, which formally joined the Axis on 23 November. Antonescu insisted several times on the reversal of the Second Vienna Award, being convinced that the only way to regain the territory would be to cooperate with Germany.

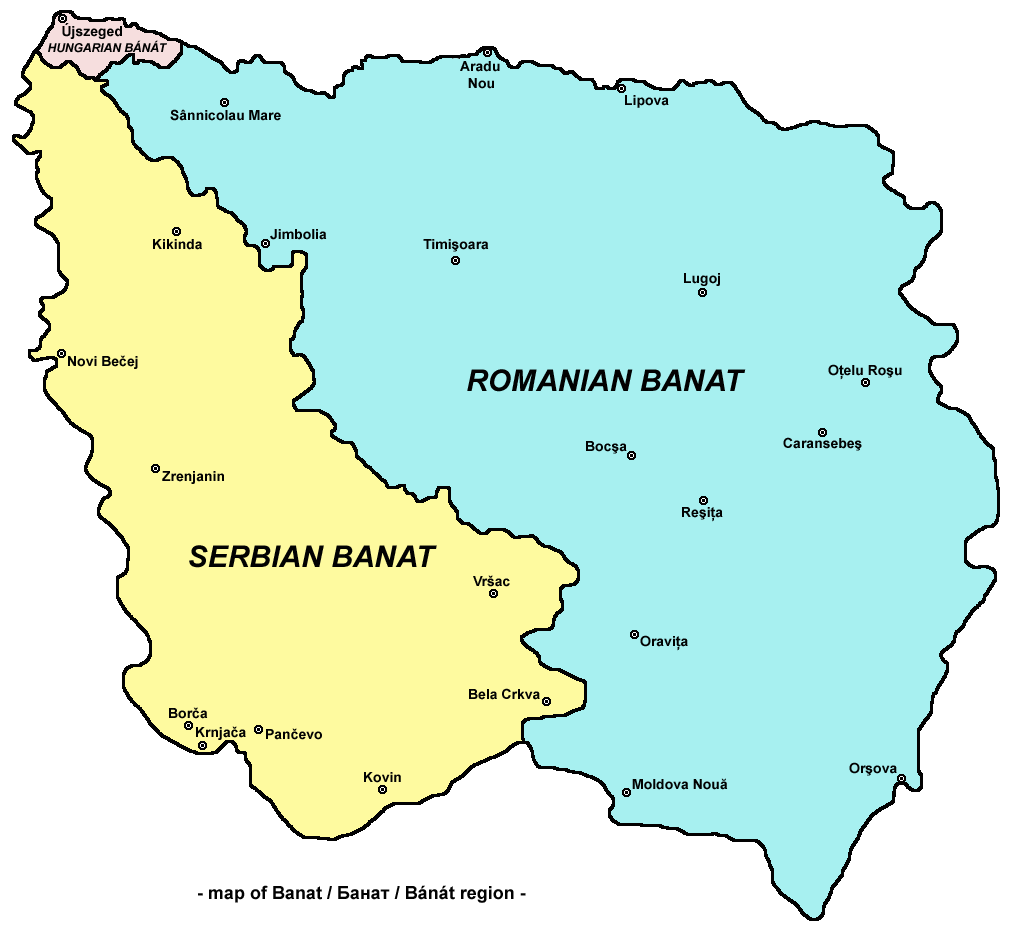
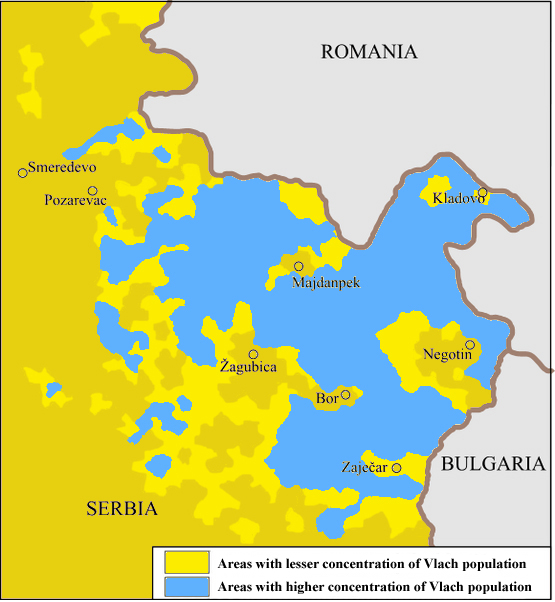
Map of the historical region of Banat (top) and an ethnic map of the Timok Valley (bottom) where Romanians are labelled as "Vlachs"

The Axis needed to secure all borders before an attack on the Soviet Union. Thus, Yugoslavia was invaded on 6 April 1941. Hitler had already announced how the Yugoslav territories would be partitioned, including the Serbian Banat, which was to become Hungarian. Although Romania was not included in the operation, the Romanian Government was already suspicious of a possible invasion of Yugoslavia and of the possibility that Hungary could annex the Serbian Banat. At that time, tensions between the two countries were high due to the conflict in Northern Translyvania and the massacres carried against the Romanian population by the Hungarians. Antonescu, seeing himself forced to act, announced during a meeting with a German commander on 3 April that a Hungarian occupation of the region would outrage the Romanian public and force him to intervene, causing a possible war between Hungary and Romania. After this, Hungarian troops were prohibited from operating east of the Tisza River (in Banat), and on 12 April, the Serbian Banat was placed under German military administration. This was seen by Hitler as "preparation" for the Hungarian rule.

During a meeting between the Italian foreign minister Galeazzo Ciano and his German counterpart Joachim von Ribbentrop, Ciano declared his wish to give the Serbian Banat (apart from Bačka and Baranya) to Hungary. This is probably what triggered the Romanian Government's official claim to the territory sent on 23 April. Romanian officials, national newspapers and the population itself had already demanded this. For them, this request was rightful based on ethnic and historic grounds. Antonescu said that an annexation of the Serbian Banat would increase his popularity and strengthen his position as leader, being after all the territorial losses of 1940 the ones that forced Carol II to flee the country. Antonescu later wrote a memorandum on 11 June and sent it to von Ribbentrop. On it, he reaffirmed the loyalty of Romania and the need to yield not only Banat, but also the Timok Valley, which had a large Romanian population. This memorandum also claimed that "the region from Timok to Thessaloniki was Romanian". To support this, Antonescu attempted to persuade Hitler by showing him the wish of the Romanians of Banat, Timok and also Transnistria to be incorporated into Romania and the situation of the Aromanians in the Balkans. At the end, the Germans never found a solution that satisfied both Hungary and Romania, and the Serbian Banat remained under military administration until 1944.

Romanian territory in May 1942

On 12 June, Hitler revealed to Antonescu his plans to invade the Soviet Union. Antonescu promised him full economic and military participation. The population strongly supported the idea, as it was seen as the opportunity to eliminate the Russian threat once and for all. A few hours before the invasion began, Antonescu and Michael I declared a "holy war" for the liberation of Bessarabia and Northern Bukovina. The invasion began on 22 June, but Romanian military operations began on 2 July. After several battles, both regions were reintegrated into the Romanian state on 25 July. A meeting between Hitler and Antonescu on 6 August determined that the area between the Dniester and the Southern Bug rivers would be placed under Romanian military–civil administration. Further, Romanian troops would occupy the area between the Southern Bug and Dnieper River and a few others would cross the Dnieper and continue the invasion. On 19 August, the Transnistria Governorate was established in the area between the Dniester and the Southern Bug, but it was not formally annexed into Romania unlike Bessarabia and Northern Bukovina. Many Romanian troops participated in the German offensives in southern Russia and the Caucasus. The defeat at the Battle of Stalingrad convinced Antonescu that a German victory was impossible, and he began to protect the east of Romania, although he continued to support Germany with troops and material.

Several Romanian political figures tried to get Romania out of the war, their leader being Iuliu Maniu. He had communicated to the British Government that the Romanian public was not interested in war beyond the Dniester (the border between Bessarabia and Transnistria) and that they only wanted to defend Romanian territorial integrity, including Northern Transylvania. However, in January 1943, the United Kingdom reported that the borders of post-war Romania had to be negotiated with the Soviet Union. In March 1944, Soviet troops entered Romanian territory (Northern Moldavia). Barbu Știrbey, Maniu's representative, began negotiating with the Allies and the Soviet Union in early 1944 in Cairo. The Soviet representative presented on 12 April the minimum conditions for an armistice. These included a breakdown of relations with Germany and switching to the Allied side to fight against it, the restoration of the 1940 Romanian-Soviet border and the nullification of the Second Vienna Award (thus giving Northern Transylvania back to Romania). After unsuccessful attempts to soften these conditions, Maniu accepted on 10 June 1944. Opposition against the war and Antonescu's dictatorship grew greatly, and on 23 August, while a Soviet offensive continued to take place, King Michael I and others performed a coup that ended in Antonescu's arrest. That same day, he announced that Romania had officially joined the Allies and that the army was being mobilized for the liberation of Northern Transylvania. An official armistice was signed on 13 September. A struggle for power began between the various Romanian political parties, and the communist leaders traveled to Moscow, where they were promised full support for seize power. After strong Soviet pressure, Petru Groza, leader of the communist-allied Ploughmen's Front, took power.

Map showing the Romanian territorial changes in the Danube Delta of 1948

On 10 February 1947, the Paris Peace Treaties that confirmed Romanian sovereignty over Northern Transylvania were signed. A new government with Groza again as leader which was predominantly communist was established in December 1946. It began to dominate all aspects of the Romanian economy in early 1947. Its intention was to remove all political opponents such as Maniu, and on 29 October 1947, they were tried. The last step for communist domination over Romania was made on 30 December 1947. King Michael I was forced to abdicate, and afterwards, the Romanian People's Republic was proclaimed.

Although the Paris Peace Treaties reaffirmed the border between Romania and the Soviet Union, the latter had occupied in 1944 a group of islands that had not been included in the ultimatum of 1940. The Soviet Union insisted on signing a protocol defining the border between both countries, which was fulfilled on 4 February 1948. According to this protocol, the Soviet Union would annex the Danubian islands of Tătaru Mic, Daleru Mic, Daleru Mare, Maican and Limba, as well as the Snake Island in the Black Sea. On the other side, Romania would keep the Danubian islands of Tătaru Mare, Cernovca and Babina.

=== Postwar period ===
Map showing the claims of Romania and Ukraine and the final decision done by the ICJ

After the fall of communism in Romania with the Romanian Revolution of December 1989, Romania tried to regain the small Snake Island. Since it is located on the Black Sea, it has access to the sea's continental shelf rich in petroleum and natural gas resources. The owner of it was now Ukraine, as the Soviet Union had collapsed in 1991. Romania later gave up on the island and in 1997, Ukraine and it signed a good neighborliness and cooperation treaty. It was specified on it that both countries had to define the maritime boundary between them. All rounds of negotiations failed. Therefore, Romania requested the International Court of Justice (ICJ) to solve the dispute, thus starting a case.

Romania argued that in the 1997 treaty, both countries agreed to a declaration saying that the island cannot support a permanent population or an economic life on its own, so it should not affect the maritime borders of both countries. Ukraine responded by saying that there is a difference between a declaration and a reservation and that this does not change the legal status of the treaty. The ICJ was therefore under no obligation to take this into account. After examining old treaties between Romania and the Soviet Union, it was determined that Snake Island should have an arc of 22 kilometres (12 nautical miles) as delimitation. In addition, the previous Romanian declaration was later applied, and the ICJ determined that Snake Island was not an island, but a rock without the ability to change the maritime borders between the two countries. The ICJ also said that Ukraine's delimitation claim was too close to the Romanian coast for no apparent reason, affecting the security interests of the country. At the end, the ICJ concluded the case on 3 February 2009 by drawing a boundary line that gave 80% of the disputed area to Romania.

== Aftermath ==
Nowadays, there are several supporters of the idea of expanding the current borders of Romania. Most of them are nationalists, extremists and far-right parties like Greater Romania Party or Noua Dreaptă. These focus specially on the recovery of Bessarabia and Northern Bukovina (a restoration of Greater Romania), now in Ukraine and the Republic of Moldova. They also oppose strongly territorial claims against Romania, namely Hungarian ones regarding Transylvania.

== See also ==
- Administrative divisions of Romania
- Greater Romania
- Principality of the Pindus
- Romanianization
- Székely autonomy movement
