= Development regions of Romania =

Overview article

Map of the development regions (NUTS-2 level divisions)

Map of the macroregions (NUTS-1 level divisions)

The development regions of Romania (Romanian: Regiunile de dezvoltare ale României) refer to the eight regional divisions created in Romania in 1998 in order to better co-ordinate regional development as Romania progressed towards accession to the European Union (EU). The development regions correspond to NUTS 2-level divisions in EU member states. Despite becoming increasingly significant in regional development projects, Romania's development regions do not actually have an administrative status and do not have a legislative or executive council or government. Rather, they serve a function for allocating EU PHARE funds for regional development, as well as for collection of regional statistics. They also co-ordinate a range of regional development projects and became members of the Committee of the Regions when Romania joined the EU on 1 January 2007.

== List ==
There are eight development regions in Romania, which (with the exception of București-Ilfov) are named by their geographical position in the country:

- RO1 – Macroregiunea Unu:
  - Nord-Vest – RO11; 6 counties; 2,544,010 inhabitants; 34,159 km^{2} (13,189 sq mi)
  - Centru – RO12; 6 counties; 2,291,551 inhabitants; 34,082 km^{2} (13,159 sq mi)
- RO2 – Macroregiunea Doi:
  - Nord-Est – RO21; 6 counties; 3,218,218 inhabitants; 36,850 km^{2} (14,230 sq mi)
  - Sud-Est – RO22; 6 counties; 2,331,165 inhabitants; 35,762 km^{2} (13,808 sq mi)
- RO3 – Macroregiunea Trei:
  - Sud - Muntenia – RO31; 7 counties; 2,825,694 inhabitants; 34,489 km^{2} (13,316 sq mi)
  - București - Ilfov – RO32; 1 county and Bucharest; 2,313,455 inhabitants; 1,811 km^{2} (699 sq mi)
- RO4 – Macroregiunea Patru:
  - Sud-Vest Oltenia – RO41; 5 counties; 1,848,028 inhabitants; 29,212 km^{2} (11,279 sq mi)
  - Vest – RO42; 4 counties; 1,671,030 inhabitants; 32,028 km^{2} (12,366 sq mi)

All but Sud-Est are landlocked.

| No | Name | Code | Area, km^{2} | Population (2025-01-01) | Municipalities | Other cities | Communes | Villages |
|---|---|---|---|---|---|---|---|---|
| 1 | Nord-Est | RO21 | 36,850 | 3,218,218 | 17 | 29 | 506 | 2,414 |
| 2 | Sud-Est | RO22 | 35,762 | 2,331,165 | 11 | 24 | 355 | 1,448 |
| 3 | Sud - Muntenia | RO31 | 34,453 | 2,825,694 | 16 | 32 | 519 | 2,019 |
| 4 | Sud-Vest Oltenia | RO41 | 29,212 | 1,848,028 | 11 | 29 | 408 | 2,070 |
| 5 | Vest | RO42 | 32,034 | 1,671,030 | 12 | 30 | 281 | 1,327 |
| 6 | Nord-Vest | RO11 | 34,159 | 2,544,010 | 15 | 28 | 403 | 1,800 |
| 7 | Centru | RO12 | 34,100 | 2,291,551 | 20 | 37 | 357 | 1,788 |
| 8 | București - Ilfov | RO32 | 1,821 | 2,313,455 | 1 | 8 | 32 | 91 |
| Total | | | 238,391 | 19,036,031 | 103 | 217 | 2,861 | 12,957 |

== Economy ==
Gross domestic product (GDP) as reported by Eurostat
| | 2006 | | | | | 2016 | | | | | 2020 | 2023 |
| Region (NUTS-3) | Total (million €) | € per capita | PPP (million €) | PPP € per capita | % of EU average GDP (PPP) | Total (million €) | € per capita | PPP (million €) in 2014 | PPP € per capita | % of EU average GDP (PPP) | % of EU average GDP per capita | % of EU average GDP (PPP) |
| Romania | 98,419 | 4,500 | 196,999 | 9,200 | 38 | 169,771 | 8,600 | 301,801 | 17,000 | 58 | 72 | 78 |
|---|---|---|---|---|---|---|---|---|---|---|---|---|
| Nord-Vest | 11,675 | 4,200 | 23,370 | 8,700 | 36 | 19,519 | 7,600 | 34,001 | 14,300 | 51 | 67 | 71 |
| Centru | 11,335 | 4,500 | 22,689 | 9,100 | 37 | 18,761 | 8,000 | 33,349 | 15,800 | 54 | 67 | 70 |
| Nord-Est | 10,787 | 2,900 | 21,591 | 5,900 | 24 | 17,081 | 5,300 | 30,912 | 10,400 | 36 | 46 | 47 |
| Sud-Est | 11,051 | 3,800 | 22,119 | 7,900 | 32 | 18,159 | 7,400 | 34,020 | 14,600 | 52 | 58 | 61 |
| Sud - Muntenia | 12,482 | 3,800 | 24,985 | 7,700 | 31 | 20,583 | 6,800 | 36,630 | 14,200 | 46 | 55 | 60 |
| București - Ilfov | 22,946 | 9,900 | 45,931 | 21,100 | 86 | 46 994 | 20,500 | 81,267 | 40,400 | 139 | 164 | 190 |
| Sud-Vest Oltenia | 8,138 | 3,600 | 16,290 | 7,200 | 29 | 12,451 | 6,300 | 22,677 | 12,400 | 42 | 56 | 62 |
| Vest | 9,940 | 5,300 | 19,897 | 10,500 | 43 | 16 081 | 8,900 | 28,698 | 17,600 | 60 | 74 | 78 |

== HDI index ==
Map of Romanian regions by HDI in 2023. Legend: ≥ 0.900 0.840 – 0.900 0.820 – 0.839 0.800 - 0.819

List of NUTS2 statistical regions of Romania by Human Development Index as of 2023

| Rank | Region | HDI (2023) |
Very high human development
| 1 | București - Ilfov | 0.938 |
| 2 | Nord-Vest | 0.848 |
| 2 | Vest | 0.848 |
| - | Romania (average) | 0.845 |
| 4 | Centru | 0.840 |
| 5 | Sud-Vest | 0.823 |
| 6 | Sud-Est | 0.813 |
| 7 | Sud | 0.803 |
| 8 | Nord-Est | 0.802 |

== See also ==
- Administrative divisions of Romania
- Region (Europe)
- Nomenclature of Territorial Units for Statistics
- Historical regions of Romania
