= Macroregiunea Patru =

Coordinates: 46°46′N 23°35′E

Macroregion Four Macroregiunea Patru
- Region
- Country: Romania

Area
  - Total: 61,244.9 km^{2} (23,646.8 sq mi)

Population (2024)
  - Total: 3,526,875
  - Density: 57.5864/km^{2} (149.148/sq mi)

GDP
  - Total: €53.471 billion (2023)
- Time zone: UTC+2 (EET)
  - Summer (DST): UTC+3 (EEST)
- NUTS code: RO4

Macroregion Four (Romanian: Macroregiunea Patru) is a statistical (NUTS 1) region of Romania. It consists of two development regions (West and South-West Oltenia), nine counties, respectively.
