= Sud-Est (development region) =

Coordinates: 44°10′N 28°38′E

- Region
- Country: Romania
- Development Agency HQ: Brăila
- Largest city: Constanța

Area
  - Total: 35,762 km^{2} (13,808 sq mi)
  - Rank: 2nd

Population (2021 census)
  - Total: 2,367,987
  - Rank: 4th
  - Density: 66.215/km^{2} (171.50/sq mi)

Ethnic groups
  - Romanians: 95.2%
  - Roma: 1.7%
  - Turks: 1.0%
  - Lipovans: 0.9%

GDP
  - Total: €31.360 billion (2023)
- Time zone: UTC+2 (EET)
  - Summer (DST): UTC+3 (EEST)
- NUTS code: RO22
- HDI (2022): 0.796 high · 6th
- Website: http://www.adrse.ro/

Sud-Est (English South East) is a development region in Romania. As with other development regions, it does not have any administrative powers, its main function being to co-ordinate regional development projects and manage funds from the European Union.

== Counties ==
The region covers the Southeast part of the country, and it includes the old historical regions of Dobrudja, southern Moldavia, and northeastern Muntenia. The Sud-Est region is made up of the following counties:

- Brăila (Muntenia)
- Buzău (Muntenia)
- Constanța (Dobrudja)
- Galați (Moldavia)
- Tulcea (Dobrudja)
- Vrancea (Moldavia)

== See also ==
- Development regions of Romania
- Nomenclature of Territorial Units for Statistics
