= Nord-Est (development region) =

Coordinates: 47°09′25″N 27°35′25″E

- Region
- Country: Romania
- Development Agency HQ: Piatra Neamț
- Largest city: Iași

Area
  - Total: 36,850 km^{2} (14,230 sq mi)
  - Rank: 1st

Population (2021 census)
  - Total: 3,226,436
  - Rank: 1st
  - Density: 87.56/km^{2} (226.8/sq mi)

Ethnic groups
  - Romanians: 97.9%
  - Roma: 1.2%
  - Ukrainians: 0.3%

GDP
  - Total: €32.786 billion (2023)
- Time zone: UTC+2 (EET)
  - Summer (DST): UTC+3 (EEST)
- NUTS code: RO21
- HDI (2022): 0.785 high · 8th
- Website: http://www.adrnordest.ro/

Nord-Est (English: North East) is a development region in Romania. As other development regions, it does not have any administrative powers, its main function being to co-ordinate regional development projects and manage funds from the European Union.

The Nord-Est Region is an area with a rich historical, cultural and spiritual background. Geographically, the region goes from mountain ranges in the west, towards the gentle plateaus with important vineyards, and rolling plains with large farms in the east. It is also one of the tourist destinations in Romania.

== Counties ==
The region covers the Northeast part of the country and, traditionally, it is a part of the old historical region of Moldavia (mainly, Western Moldavia and southern Bukovina). The Nord-Est region is made up of the following counties:

- Bacău
- Botoșani
- Iași
- Neamț
- Suceava
- Vaslui

== Economy ==
The economy of Nord-Est region is mixed, agricultural, especially towards the east, and with a number of industrial centres. The regional GDP per capita is the lowest in Romania, at about two-thirds of the national average.

Main cities:

- Iași, the former capital of Moldavia and the largest city in Nord-Est, has a strong industrial base and is one of Romania's main university, cultural, arts and business centers;
- Bacău is a dynamic industrial and commercial centre;
- Suceava (the medieval capital of Moldavia) and Piatra Neamț were also industrialized cities, and are important historical and tourism based cities;
- Botoșani and Vaslui are traditional developed trade and agriculture centers, and important bases for the regions textile and processing industries.
- Bârlad, Roman, Onești and Pașcani are other important industrial based cities in the region.

== Demographics ==
Nord-Est has a total population of 3,302,217 (2011 Census) making it the most populated region in the country. Its population density is 90/km^{2}.

At the 2002 census, the region had a significant Romanian majority, of 97.9%, with the second largest minority being the Romani, who make up 1.2% of the population. Other minorities, which include Ukrainians, Lipovans, Csangos, Poles, Hutsuls, Hungarians, and Germans make up the rest of the population (0.9%).

Romanian is the most widely spoken language, spoken as a first language by 98.7% of the inhabitants of the region. Minority languages include Romany, spoken by 0.6% of the population, and Ukrainian (0.3%).

== See also ==
- Development regions of Romania
- Nomenclature of Territorial Units for Statistics
