= București - Ilfov =

Coordinates: 44°25′57″N 26°06′14″E

București – Ilfov
- Region
- Interactive map of București – Ilfov
- Country: Romania
- Development Agency HQ: Bucharest
- Largest city: Bucharest

Area
  - Total: 1,811 km^{2} (699 sq mi)
  - Rank: 8th

Population (2021 census)
  - Total: 2,259,665
  - Rank: 6th
  - Density: 1,248/km^{2} (3,232/sq mi)

GDP
  - Total: €104.409 billion (2024)
  - Per capita: €45,140 (2024)
- Time zone: UTC+2 (EET)
  - Summer (DST): UTC+3 (EEST)
- NUTS code: RO32
- HDI (2023): 0.940 very high · 1st
- Website: http://www.adrbi.ro/

The București – Ilfov development region (pronunciation: [bukuˈreʃtʲ ˈilfov]) is a development region in Romania, encompassing the national capital, Bucharest, as well as the surrounding Ilfov County. As other development regions, it does not have any administrative powers, its main function being to co-ordinate regional development projects and manage funds from the European Union. It is also used as an entity in regional statistical analysis at the European Union NUTS-II level.

== See also ==
- Development regions of Romania
- Nomenclature of Territorial Units for Statistics
