= Nord-Vest (development region) =

Coordinates: 46°46′N 23°35′E

- Region
- Country: Romania
- Development Agency HQ: Cluj-Napoca
- Largest city: Cluj-Napoca

Area
  - Total: 34,159 km^{2} (13,189 sq mi)
  - Rank: 4th

Population (2021 census)
  - Total: 2,521,793
  - Rank: 3rd
  - Density: 73.825/km^{2} (191.21/sq mi)

Ethnic groups
  - Romanians: 75.0%
  - Hungarians: 19.3%
  - Roma: 3.5%
  - Ukrainians: 1.3%

GDP
  - Total: $50.509 billion (2025)
- Time zone: UTC+2 (EET)
  - Summer (DST): UTC+3 (EEST)
- NUTS code: RO11
- HDI (2022): 0.848 very high · 2nd
- Website: http://www.nord-vest.ro/

Nord-Vest (English: North West) is a development region in Romania, created in 1998. As other development regions, it does not have any administrative powers, its main function being to co-ordinate regional development projects and manage funds from the European Union.

== Counties ==
The Nord-Vest region is made up of the 6 following counties:

- Bihor
- Bistrița-Năsăud
- Cluj
- Maramureș
- Satu Mare
- Sălaj

== Economy ==
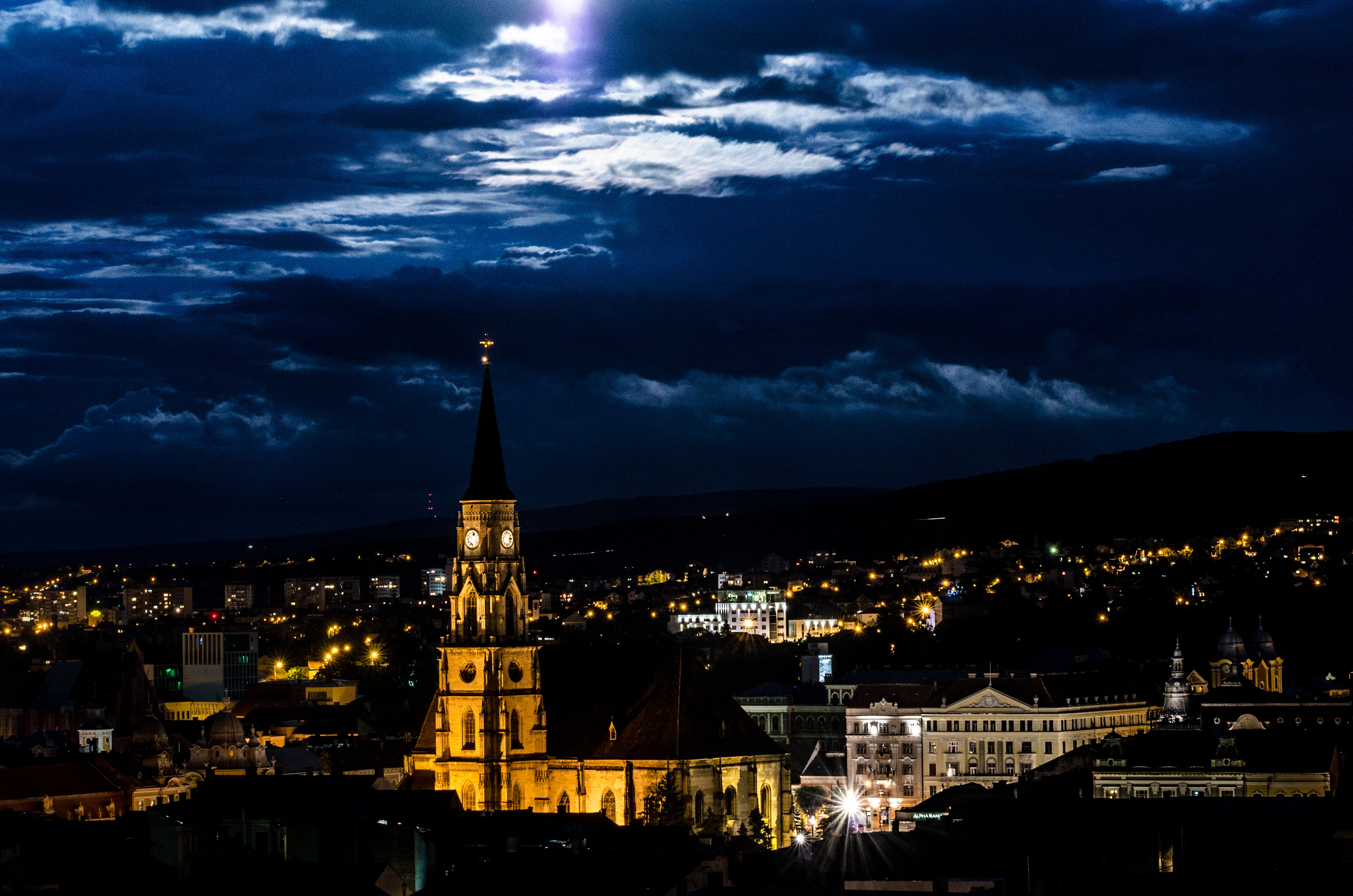
Cluj-Napoca is the major economic centre of the region

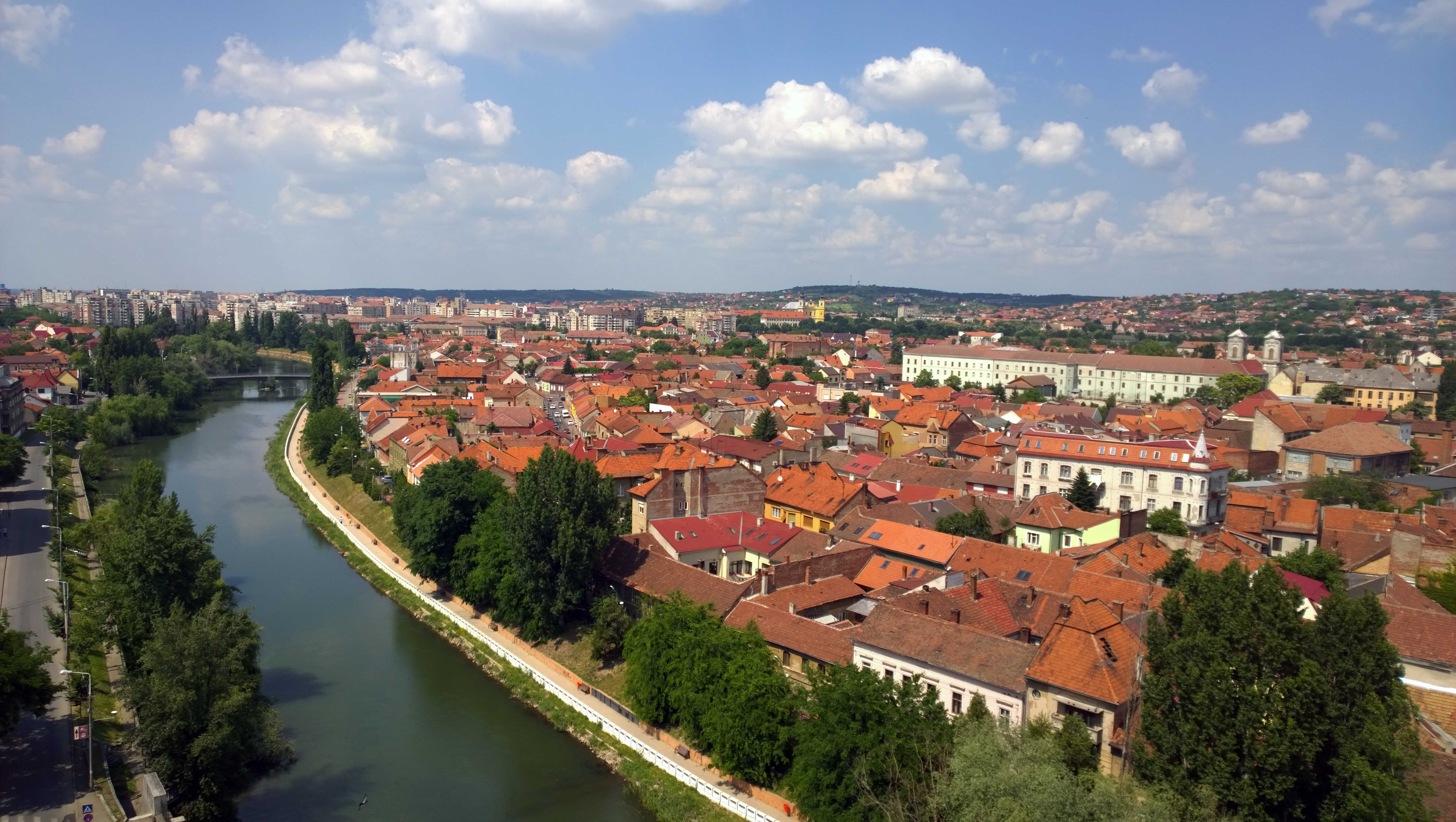
Oradea is another important economic and cultural centre of the region

The economy of Nord-Vest is mainly agricultural (46% of its population having agriculture as their main occupation), even though there is some heavy and light industry in the major regional industrial centres of Cluj-Napoca, Oradea, Baia Mare, Bistrița, Satu Mare and Zalău.

There are also several mining centres in Maramureș County and in the Apuseni Mountains. Many of these mining areas have been partly shut down, resulting in significant local unemployment, even though unemployment in the Nord-Vest region is at approximately 4%, below the Romanian national average of 5.5%. Many mining areas have been classified by the government as defavourised zones, with incentives given to investors who plan to create jobs in these areas and diversify the economy.

The region's GDP per capita is slightly below the Romanian average (approximately 90% of the Romanian average), despite the fact that the major cities – Cluj-Napoca and Oradea – are some of the most prosperous in Romania.

== Infrastructure ==
The region is crossed by five European roads – E60, E81, E79, E671 and E58. Additionally, the A3 freeway is currently in construction and will cross Cluj, Sălaj and Bihor counties in the region. Expressway DEX4 is currently being constructed in Cluj County and Expressway DEX16 is under construction in Bihor County. Nord-Vest also it has an extensive railway infrastructure connecting most of the important towns.

The region has four airports – Cluj-Napoca, Oradea, Satu Mare and Baia Mare. Currently, Cluj-Napoca, Oradea and Satu Mare airports have international flights while Baia Mare airport is temporarily closed.

== Demographics ==
Romania's Nord-Vest development region has a total population of 2,600,132 (2011 Census). The region is one of the most ethnically-diverse in Romania, with 25% of the population coming from a minority group. After Romanians, who make up 75% of the population, the largest minority group are Hungarians, who comprise slightly less than 20% of the population. Hungarians are mainly concentrated in urban centres, especially those near the Hungarian border, such as Oradea and Satu Mare. The third largest minority are Romani people, who make up 3.5%, slightly above the national average. Romani people are spread relatively evenly throughout the region, even though the highest proportions are in Bihor county, where approximately 5% of the population is Romani.

Romanian is the most widely spoken language, spoken as a first language by 76.6% of the inhabitants of the region. The other important languages are Hungarian, spoken by 19.9% of the population, Romani and Ukrainian. Religion is mainly based on ethnic groups, with the largest religion being Romanian Orthodoxy, observed by 68.38% of the population, mostly ethnic Romanians. Other important religions are the Reformed Church (12.70%), Roman Catholicism (6.86%) and Greek Catholicism (4.20%).

=== Age and fertility ===
The Nord-Vest region has the following age structure, according to the 2011 census:

Age group	Population	% of total
0–4 years	138,001	5.3%
5–9 years	138,975	5.3%
10–14 years	141,587	5.5%
15–19 years	150,960	5.8%
20–24 years	195,377	7.5%
25–29 years	178,518	6.9%
30–34 years	196,938	7.6%
35–39 years	199,398	7.7%
40–44 years	209,816	8.1%
45–49 years	149,585	5.8%
50–54 years	172,566	6.6%
55–59 years	180,088	6.9%
60–64 years	155,323	6.0%
65–69 years	120,034	4.6%
70–74 years	109,073	4.2%
75-79 years	83,406	3.2%
80-84 years	52,430	2.0%
85+ years	28,057	1.1%
Total	2,600,132	100.00%

=== Language ===
- Romanian: 1,898,588
- Hungarian: 474,134
- Romani: 45,624
- Ukrainian: 32,056
- Slovak: 6,964
- German: 2,847
- Other: 3,567
- Unavailable information: 136,352

=== Religion ===
- Romanian Orthodox: 1,873,647 (68.38%)
- Reformed: 347,857 (12.70%)
- Roman Catholic: 187,988 (6.86%)
- Greek Catholic: 114,978 (4.20%)
- Pentecostal: 106,959 (3.90%)
- Baptists: 54,800 (2%)
- Atheist/No religion: 5,244 (0.19%)

=== Citizenship ===
99.9% of the population of Nord-Vest region has Romanian citizenship. There are 2,343 residents, or 0.09% of the population, of foreign citizenship, including:

- Moldovan citizenship: 621
- Italian citizenship: 298
- Ukrainian citizenship: 156

2,687 people, or 0.10% of the population, has dual citizenship.

== See also ==
- Development regions of Romania
- Nomenclature of Territorial Units for Statistics
