= Sud - Muntenia (development region) =

Coordinates: 44°12′N 27°20′E

- Region
- Country: Romania
- Development Agency HQ: Călărași
- Largest city: Ploiești

Area
  - Total: 34,489 km^{2} (13,316 sq mi)
  - Rank: 3rd

Population (2021 census)
  - Total: 2,864,339
  - Rank: 2nd
  - Density: 83.051/km^{2} (215.10/sq mi)

Ethnic groups
  - Romanians: 96.9%
  - Roma: 2.9%

GDP
  - Total: €37.228 billion (2024)
  - Per capita: €13,178 (2024)
- Time zone: UTC+2 (EET)
  - Summer (DST): UTC+3 (EEST)
- NUTS code: RO31
- HDI (2022): 0.785 high · 7th
- Website: http://www.adrmuntenia.ro/

Sud-Muntenia (South-Muntenia) is a development region in Romania. As other development regions, it does not have any administrative powers, its main function being to co-ordinate regional development projects and manage funds from the European Union. It is located entirely in the historic region of Muntenia, with its Development Agency HQ in Călărași.

== Counties ==
The Sud region is made up of the following counties:

- Argeș
- Călărași
- Dâmbovița
- Giurgiu
- Ialomița
- Prahova
- Teleorman

== See also ==
- Development regions of Romania
- Nomenclature of Territorial Units for Statistics
