= Centru (development region) =

Coordinates: 45°40′N 25°37′E

- Region
- Country: Romania
- Development Agency HQ: Alba Iulia
- Largest city: Brașov

Area
  - Total: 34,082 km^{2} (13,159 sq mi)
  - Rank: 5th

Population (2021 census)
  - Total: 2,271,067
  - Rank: 5th
  - Density: 66.635/km^{2} (172.58/sq mi)

Ethnic groups
  - Romanians: 64.3%
  - Hungarians: 30.9%
  - Roma: 2.7%
  - Germans: 0.4%

GDP
  - Total: €39.265 billion (2024)
  - Per capita: €17,139 (2024)
- Time zone: UTC+2 (EET)
  - Summer (DST): UTC+3 (EEST)
- NUTS code: RO12
- HDI (2022): 0.840 very high · 4th
- Website: http://www.adrcentru.ro/

Centru (Centre) is a development region in Romania. As other development regions, it does not have any administrative powers, its main function being to co-ordinate regional development projects and manage funds from the European Union.

== Localization ==
Centru is situated in the center of Romania, within the greater curvature of the Carpathian Mountains, on the upper and middle courses of Mureș and Olt, being crossed by the 25th meridian east and the 46th parallel north. With an area of 34,082 km^{2}, accounting for 14.3% of the Romanian territory, Centru ranks 5th among the eight development regions. Due to its geographical position, it borders every other development region except București - Ilfov, registering approximately equal distances from its central zone to the border crossing points.

== Counties ==
The Centru region is made up of the following 6 counties: Alba, Brașov, Covasna, Harghita, Mureș and Sibiu.

== Geography ==
=== Relief ===
Lacking proper plains, the relief of Centru Region includes significant parts of the three branches of the Romanian Carpathians (almost half the area of the region), hilly area of the Transylvanian Plateau and depression area of contact between the hills and the mountains.

=== Hydrographic network ===
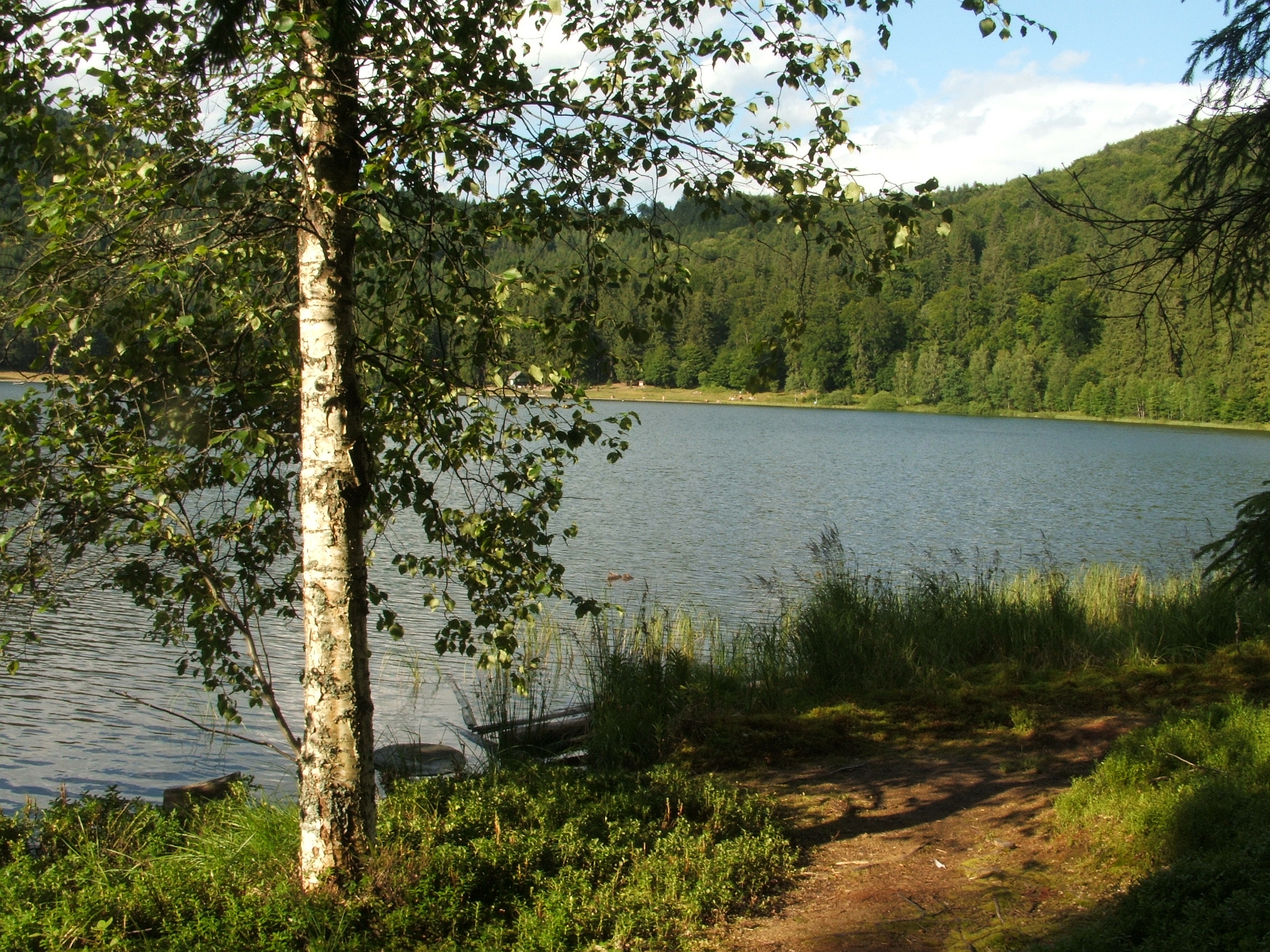
Lake Sfânta Ana, the only volcanic lake in Romania

The hydrographic network is rich, consisting of upper and middle courses of Mureș and Olt and their tributaries. Natural lakes are diverse as genesis, the most notable being the glacial lakes in the Făgăraș Mountains, Sfânta Ana volcanic lake in Harghita Mountains, Red Lake, lake formed by damming the natural course of the Bicaz River and Ursu Lake. The most important artificial lakes are the dam lakes on Olt and Sebeș rivers, salt lakes in former salt mines at Ocna Sibiului and the Transylvanian Plain fishponds.

=== Climate ===
The climate of the region is temperate continental, and varies by altitude. In the intramontane depressions of the eastern region, temperature inversions are frequent. In Bod, Brașov County, the lowest temperature in Romania, −38.5 °C (−37.3 °F), was recorded on 25 January 1942.

== Demographics ==
Centru has a total population of 2,251,268 (2011 Census). Its population density is 73.99/km^{2}, somewhat lower than the national average of 91.3/km^{2}.

The region is one of the most ethnically-diverse in Romania, with ethnic Romanians making up 64.3% of the population, Hungarians making up 30.9% and Romani making up 2.7%. Most of the Hungarian population is concentrated in the counties of Harghita and Covasna, where they make up a majority of a population. There's also a big number of Hungarians in Mures as well.

== See also ==
- Development regions of Romania
- Nomenclature of Territorial Units for Statistics
