= Vest (development region) =

- Region
- Country: Romania
- Development Agency HQ: Timișoara
- Largest city: Timișoara

Area
  - Total: 32,028 km^{2} (12,366 sq mi)
  - Rank: 6th

Population (2021 census)
  - Total: 1,668,921
  - Rank: 8th
  - Density: 52.108/km^{2} (134.96/sq mi)

Ethnic groups
  - Romanians: 86.3%
  - Hungarians: 6.7%
  - Roma: 2.5%
  - Germans: 1.4%

GDP
  - Total: €31.585 billion (2024)
  - Per capita: €18,902 (2024)
- Time zone: UTC+2 (EET)
  - Summer (DST): UTC+3 (EEST)
- NUTS code: RO42
- HDI (2022): 0.848 very high · 3rd
- Website: regiuneavest.ro

Vest (English: West) is a development region in Romania created in 1998. As with the other development regions, it does not have any administrative powers. Its primary functions are coordinating regional development projects and managing funds from the European Union.

== Counties ==
The Vest region is made up of the following counties:

- Arad
- Caraș-Severin
- Hunedoara
- Timiș

== See also ==
- Development regions of Romania
- Nomenclature of Territorial Units for Statistics
