= Outline of Romania =

Country in Central and Southeastern Europe

The Flag of Romania

The Coat of arms of Romania

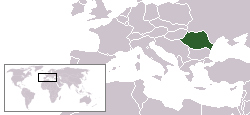
The location of Romania

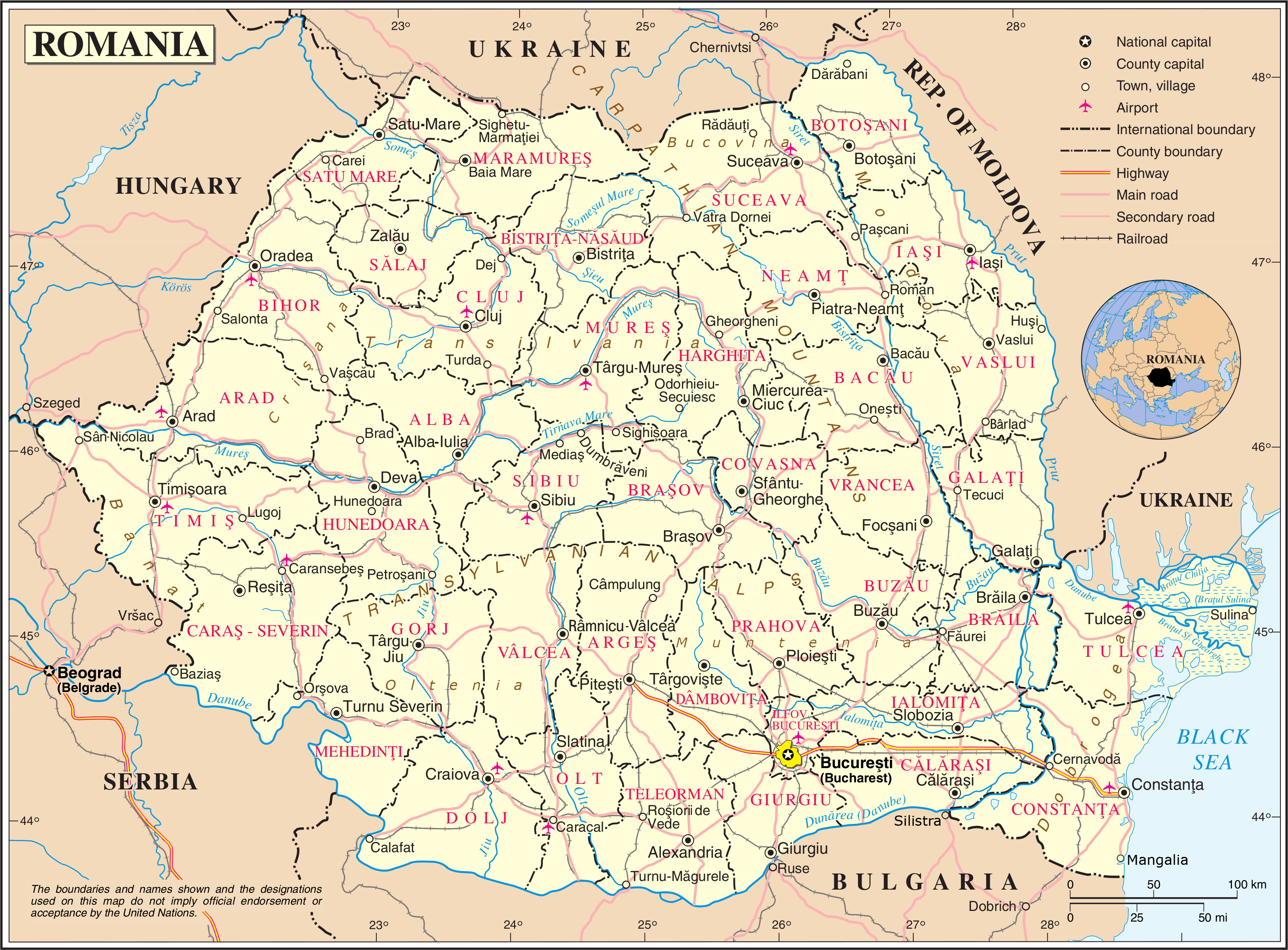
An enlargeable map of Romania

The following outline is provided as an overview of and topical guide to Romania:

Romania – unitary semi-presidential republic located in Central-Southeastern Europe, bordering the Black Sea to the south-east, between Bulgaria and Ukraine. It also borders Hungary to the west, Serbia to the south-west, and the Republic of Moldova to the east. It covers 238,391 square kilometres (92,043 sq mi) and has a predominantly temperate continental climate.

With c. 19 million inhabitants (as of early 2022), it is the seventh most populous member state of the European Union (EU). Its capital and largest city, Bucharest, is the fourth largest city in the EU. It encompasses the historical regions of Wallachia (including Dobruja), Moldavia (including Bukovina), Transylvania (including Banat, Maramureș, and Crișana). Romania derives from the Latin romanus, meaning "citizen of Rome".

== General reference ==
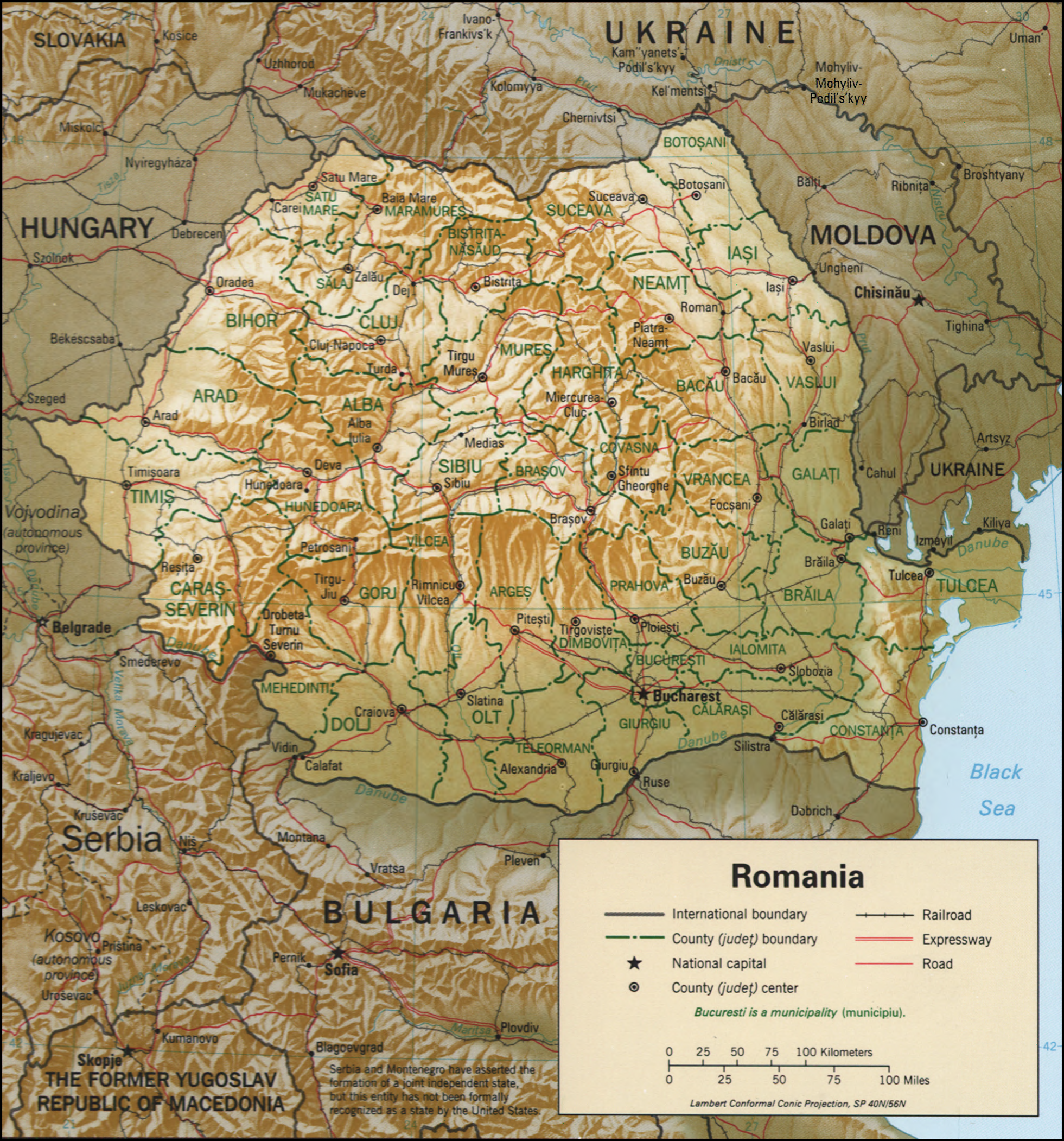
An enlargeable relief map of Romania

- Pronunciation:
- Common English country name: Romania
- Official English country name: Romania
- Common endonym(s): România
- Official endonym(s): Român
- Adjectival(s): Romanian
- Demonym(s): Romanian
- Etymology: Name of Romania
- ISO country codes: RO, ROU, 642
- ISO region codes: See ISO 3166-2:RO
- Internet country code top-level domain: .ro

== Geography of Romania ==
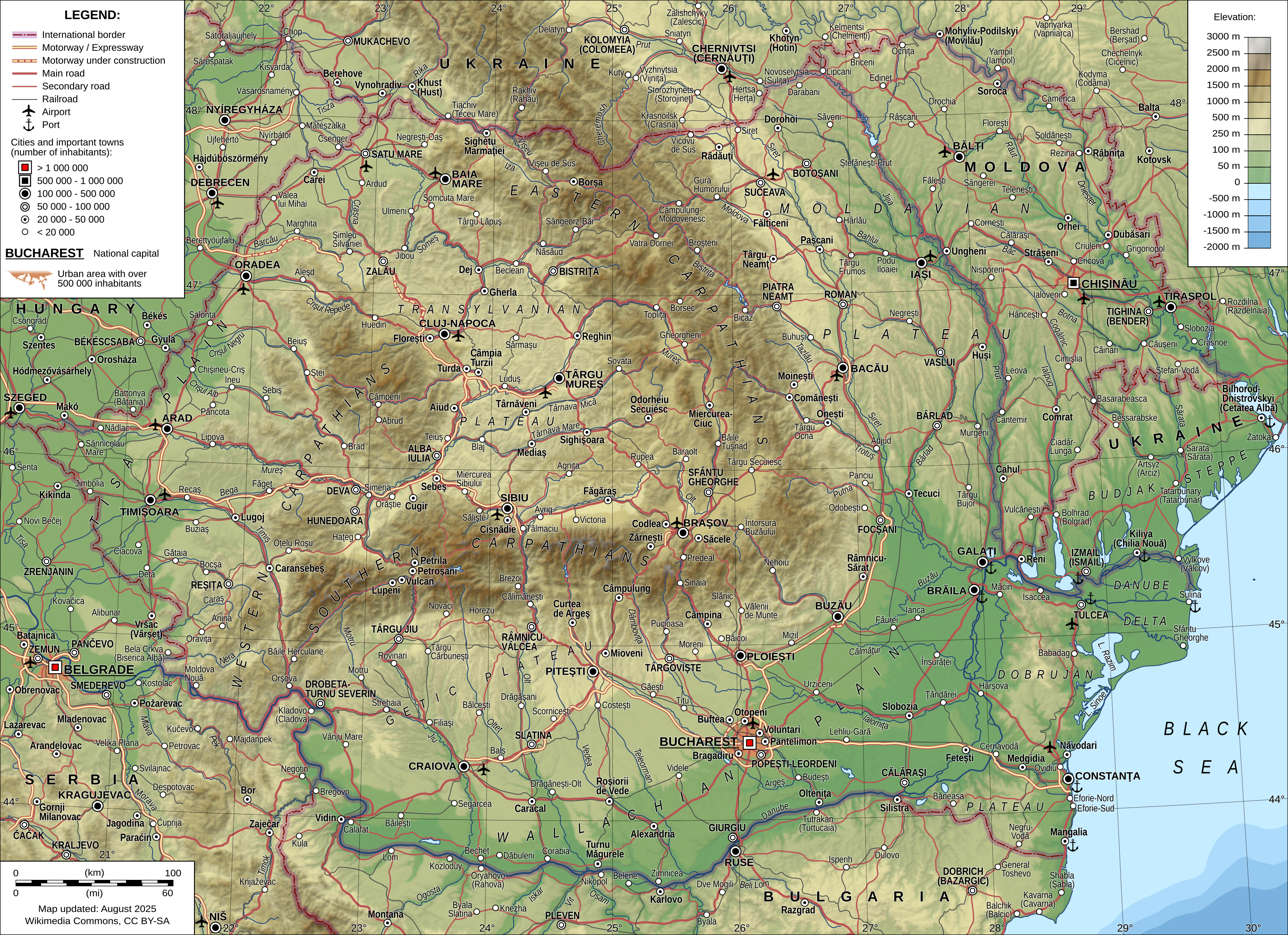
An enlargeable general map of Romania

Geography of Romania

- Romania is:
  - a country
  - a member state of the European Union
  - a member state of NATO
- Location:
  - Northern Hemisphere and Eastern Hemisphere
  - Eurasia
    - Europe
      - Central Europe
      - Eastern Europe
  - Time zone: Eastern European Time (UTC+02), Eastern European Summer Time (UTC+03)
  - Extreme points of Romania
    - High: Moldoveanu 2,544 m (8,346 ft)
    - Low: Black Sea 0 m
  - Land boundaries: 2,508 km

Bulgaria 608 km
Ukraine 531 km
Serbia 476 km
Moldova 450 km
Hungary 443 km

- Coastline: Black Sea 225 km

- Population of Romania: 19,638,000 (2017) – 65th most populous country
- Area of Romania: 238,391 km^{2}
- Atlas of Romania

=== Environment of Romania ===
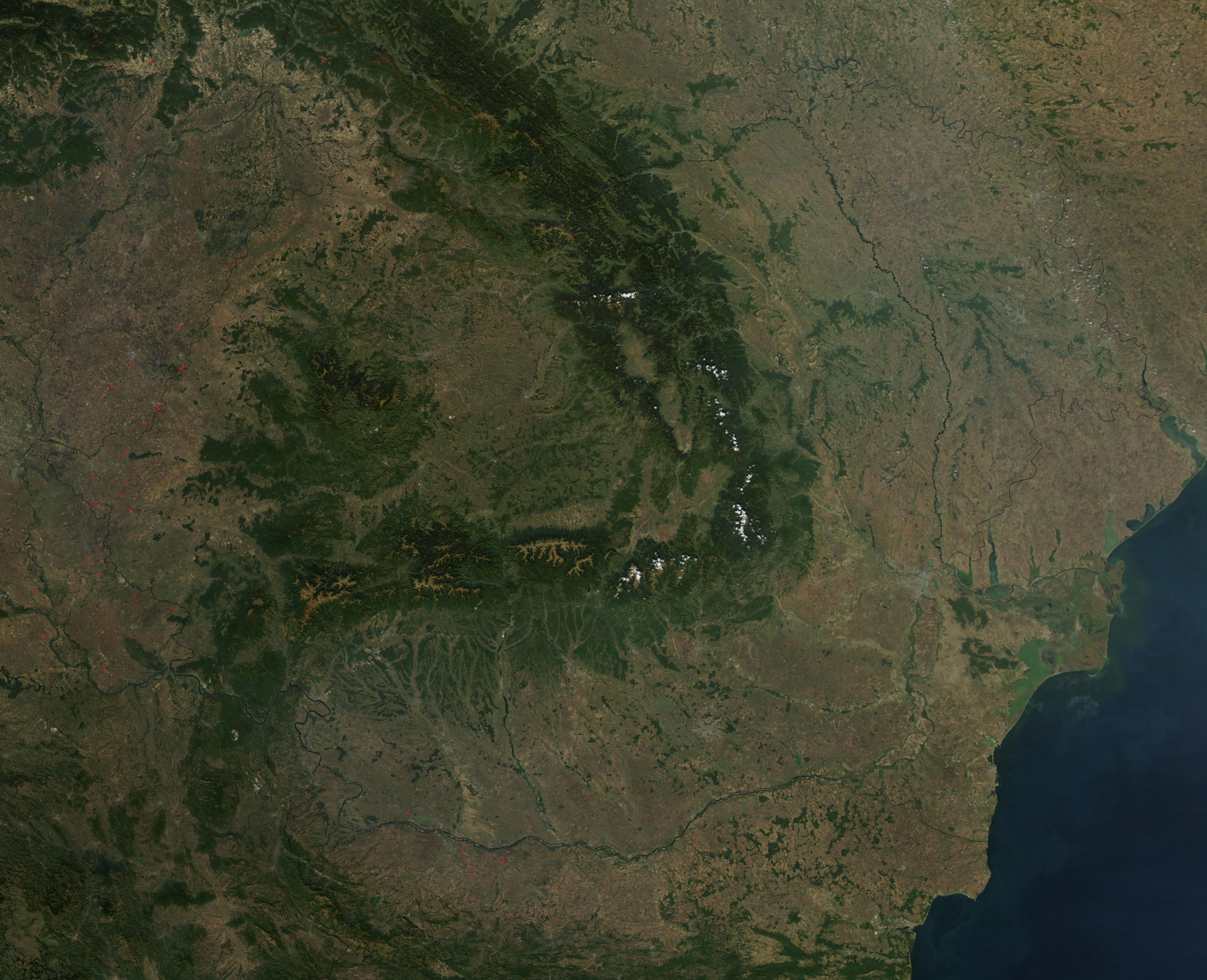
An enlargeable satellite image of Romania

- Climate of Romania
- Environmental issues in Romania
- Renewable energy in Romania
- Geology of Romania
- Protected areas of Romania
- Wildlife of Romania
  - Flora of Romania
  - Fauna of Romania
    - Birds of Romania
    - Mammals of Romania

==== Geographic features of Romania ====
- Glaciers of Romania
- Islands of Romania
- Lakes of Romania
- Mountains of Romania
- Rivers of Romania
- World Heritage Sites in Romania

=== Regions of Romania ===
==== Administrative divisions of Romania ====
Administrative divisions of Romania

- Regions of Romania
  - Counties of Romania
    - Municipalities of Romania

===== Regions of Romania =====
Map of the development regions

Development regions of Romania These are the 8 development regions in Romania, which (with the exception of București-Ilfov) are named by their geographical position in the country:

- Macroregiunea 1:
  - Nord-Vest (6 counties)
  - Centru (6 counties)
- Macroregiunea 2:
  - Nord-Est (6 counties)
  - Sud-Est (6 counties)
- Macroregiunea 3:
  - Sud-Muntenia (7 counties)
  - București-Ilfov (1 county and Bucharest)
- Macroregiunea 4:
  - Sud-Vest Oltenia (5 counties)
  - Vest (4 counties)

===== Counties of Romania =====
Counties of Romania

Name	Common abbrev.	Capital	Area (km^{2})
Alba	AB	Alba Iulia	6,242
Arad	AR	Arad	7,754
Argeș	AG	Pitești	6,862
Bacău	BC	Bacău	6,621
Bihor	BH	Oradea	7,544
Bistrița-Năsăud	BN	Bistrița	5,355
Botoșani	BT	Botoșani	4,986
Brașov	BV	Brașov	5,363
Brăila	BR	Brăila	4,766
Buzău	BZ	Buzău	6,103
Caraș-Severin	CS	Reșița	8,514
Călărași	CL	Călărași	5,088
Cluj	CJ	Cluj-Napoca	6,674
Constanța	CT	Constanța	7,071
Covasna	CV	Sfântu Gheorghe	3,710
Dâmbovița	DB	Târgoviște	4,054
Dolj	DJ	Craiova	7,414
Galați	GL	Galați	4,466
Giurgiu	GR	Giurgiu	3,526
Gorj	GJ	Târgu Jiu	5,602
Harghita	HR	Miercurea Ciuc	6,639
Hunedoara	HD	Deva	7,063
Ialomița	IL	Slobozia	4,453
Iași	IS	Iași	5,476
Ilfov	IF	Buftea	1,583
Maramureș	MM	Baia Mare	6,304
Mehedinți	MH	Drobeta-Turnu Severin	4,933
Mureș	MS	Târgu Mureș	6,714
Neamț	NT	Piatra Neamț	5,896
Olt	OT	Slatina	5,498
Prahova	PH	Ploiești	4,716
Satu Mare	SM	Satu Mare	4,418
Sălaj	SJ	Zalău	3,864
Sibiu	SB	Sibiu	5,432
Suceava	SV	Suceava	8,553
Teleorman	TR	Alexandria	5,790
Timiș	TM	Timișoara	8,697
Tulcea	TL	Tulcea	8,499
Vaslui	VS	Vaslui	5,318
Vâlcea	VL	Râmnicu Vâlcea	5,765
Vrancea	VN	Focșani	4,857
București	B	(Bucharest municipality)	228

===== Municipalities of Romania =====
Municipalities of Romania

- Capital of Romania: Bucharest
- Cities of Romania

=== Demography of Romania ===
Demographics of Romania

=== Neighbours of Romania ===
- Ukraine
- Republic of Moldova
- Bulgaria
- Serbia
- Hungary

== Government and politics of Romania ==
- Form of government: unitary semi-presidential representative democratic republic
- Capital of Romania: Bucharest
- Elections in Romania
- Political parties in Romania
- Corruption scandals in Romania

=== Branches of the government of Romania ===
Government of Romania

==== Executive branch of the government of Romania ====
- Head of state: President of Romania, Nicușor Dan
  - Presidents of Romania
- Head of government: Prime Minister of Romania, Ilie Bolojan
  - Prime ministers of Romania
- Cabinet of Romania

==== Legislative branch of the government of Romania ====
- Parliament of Romania – bicameral, composed of two equal houses:
  - The Chamber of Deputies of Romania
  - The Senate of Romania

==== Judicial branch of the government of Romania ====
Court system of Romania

- Supreme Court of Romania

=== Foreign relations of Romania ===
Foreign relations of Romania

- Diplomatic missions in Romania
- Diplomatic missions of Romania

==== International organization membership ====
Romania is a member of:

- Australia Group
- Bank for International Settlements (BIS)
- Black Sea Economic Cooperation Zone (BSEC)
- Central European Initiative (CEI)
- Confederation of European Paper Industries (CEPI)
- Council of Europe (CE)
- Euro-Atlantic Partnership Council (EAPC)
- European Bank for Reconstruction and Development (EBRD)
- European Investment Bank (EIB)
- European Space Agency (ESA)
- European Union (EU)
- Food and Agriculture Organization (FAO)
- Group of 9 (G9)
- International Atomic Energy Agency (IAEA)
- International Bank for Reconstruction and Development (IBRD)
- International Chamber of Commerce (ICC)
- International Civil Aviation Organization (ICAO)
- International Criminal Court (ICCt)
- International Criminal Police Organization (Interpol)
- International Development Association (IDA)
- International Federation of Red Cross and Red Crescent Societies (IFRCS)
- International Finance Corporation (IFC)
- International Fund for Agricultural Development (IFAD)
- International Hydrographic Organization (IHO)
- International Labour Organization (ILO)
- International Maritime Organization (IMO)
- International Mobile Satellite Organization (IMSO)
- International Monetary Fund (IMF)
- International Olympic Committee (IOC)
- International Organization for Migration (IOM)
- International Organization for Standardization (ISO)
- International Red Cross and Red Crescent Movement (ICRM)
- International Telecommunication Union (ITU)
- International Telecommunications Satellite Organization (ITSO)
- International Trade Union Confederation (ITUC)
- Inter-Parliamentary Union (IPU)
- Latin American Integration Association (LAIA) (observer)
- Multilateral Investment Guarantee Agency (MIGA)
- Nonaligned Movement (NAM) (guest)
- North Atlantic Treaty Organization (NATO)
- Nuclear Suppliers Group (NSG)
- Organisation internationale de la Francophonie (OIF)
- Organization for Security and Cooperation in Europe (OSCE)
- Organisation for the Prohibition of Chemical Weapons (OPCW)
- Organization of American States (OAS) (observer)
- Permanent Court of Arbitration (PCA)
- Southeast European Cooperative Initiative (SECI)
- United Nations (UN)
- United Nations Conference on Trade and Development (UNCTAD)
- United Nations Educational, Scientific, and Cultural Organization (UNESCO)
- United Nations High Commissioner for Refugees (UNHCR)
- United Nations Industrial Development Organization (UNIDO)
- United Nations Mission in Liberia (UNMIL)
- United Nations Mission in the Sudan (UNMIS)
- United Nations Observer Mission in Georgia (UNOMIG)
- United Nations Operation in Cote d'Ivoire (UNOCI)
- United Nations Organization Mission in the Democratic Republic of the Congo (MONUC)
- Uniunea Latină
- Universal Postal Union (UPU)
- Western European Union (WEU) (associate partner)
- World Confederation of Labour (WCL)
- World Customs Organization (WCO)
- World Federation of Trade Unions (WFTU)
- World Health Organization (WHO)
- World Intellectual Property Organization (WIPO)
- World Meteorological Organization (WMO)
- World Tourism Organization (UNWTO)
- World Trade Organization (WTO)
- Zangger Committee (ZC)

=== Law and order in Romania ===
Law of Romania

- Capital punishment in Romania
- Constitution of Romania
- Crime in Romania
- Human rights in Romania
  - LGBT rights in Romania
  - Freedom of religion in Romania
- Law enforcement in Romania

=== Military of Romania ===
Military of Romania

- Command
  - Commander-in-chief: President of Romania
    - Ministry of Defence of Romania
- Forces
  - Army of Romania
  - Navy of Romania
  - Air Force of Romania
  - Special forces of Romania
- Military history of Romania
- Military ranks of Romania

=== Local government in Romania ===
Local government in Romania

== History of Romania ==
History of Romania

=== History of Romania, by period ===
- Timeline of Romanian history
- Prehistoric Romania
- Dacia
- Roman Dacia
- Romania in the Middle Ages
- Early Modern Romania
- United Principalities
- Kingdom of Romania
  - Kings of Romania
- Romanian Campaign (World War I)
- Greater Romania
- Romania during World War II
- Socialist Republic of Romania
- Romanian Revolution
- History of Romania since 1989
- Current events of Romania

=== History of Romania, by region ===
- Bessarabia
- Dobruja
- Moldavia
- Wallachia
  - List of rulers of Wallachia
- Transylvania

=== History of Romania, by subject ===
- History of the Jews in Romania
- Military history of Romania
  - Romanian Armed Forces ranks and insignia
- Romanian mythology

== Culture of Romania ==
Culture of Romania

- Romanian Academy
- Architecture of Romania
- Cuisine of Romania
- Customs of Romania
  - Romanian Christmas customs
- Ethnic minorities in Romania
- Festivals in Romania
- Folklore of Romania
- Holidays in Romania
- Humor in Romania
- Media in Romania
- Mythology of Romania
- National symbols of Romania
  - Coat of arms of Romania
  - Flag of Romania
  - National anthem of Romania
- People of Romania
- Philosophy of Romania
- Prostitution in Romania
- Public holidays in Romania
- Records of Romania
- World Heritage Sites in Romania

=== Art in Romania ===
Art in Romania

- Architecture of Romania
- Cinema of Romania
- Dance in Romania
- Literature of Romania
- Music of Romania
  - Romanian rock music
  - National anthem of Romania
- Television in Romania
- Theatre in Romania

=== Languages of Romania ===
Languages of Romania

- Romanian language
- Moldovan language
- Istro-Romanian language
- Megleno-Romanian language
- Aromanian language
- Hungarian language

=== People of Romania ===
- Common Romanian surnames
- Eastern name order used in Romanian personal names

==== Romanians ====
Romanians

- List of Romanians
- List of Romanian writers
- List of Romanian poets
- List of Romanian monarchs
- List of famous Romanians

==== Romanian diaspora ====
Romanian diaspora

- Romanian American
  - List of Romanian Americans
- Romanian Canadian
- Romanian French
- Romanians of Australia
- Romanians in Bulgaria
- Romanians of Serbia

=== Religion in Romania ===
Religion in Romania

- Christianity in Romania
  - Baptist Union of Romania
    - Convention of the Hungarian Baptist Churches of Romania
  - Romanian Orthodox Church
- Hinduism in Romania
- Islam in Romania
- Judaism in Romania

=== Sports in Romania ===
Sports in Romania

- Football in Romania
- Romania at the Olympics

== Economy and infrastructure of Romania ==
Economy of Romania

- Economic rank, by nominal GDP (2007): 42nd (forty-second)
- Agriculture in Romania
- Banking in Romania
  - National Bank of Romania
- Communications in Romania
  - Internet in Romania
  - Romanian-language television stations
  - Radio stations in Romania
- Companies of Romania
  - Supermarkets in Romania
  - Antena 1
  - Billa
  - Angst
  - La Fourmi
  - Vodafone Romania
  - Orange Romania
  - Romanian Television
  - List of newspapers in Romania
  - Automobile Dacia
- Currency of Romania: Leu
  - ISO 4217: RON
- Energy in Romania
  - Energy policy of Romania
  - Oil industry in Romania
- Mining in Romania
- Tourism in Romania
- Bucharest Stock Exchange
- Sibiu Stock Exchange
- Health care in Romania
  - Abortion in Romania
- Transport in Romania
  - Airports in Romania
  - Rail transport in Romania
  - Roads in Romania
- Water supply and sanitation in Romania

== Education in Romania ==
Education in Romania

- List of universities in Romania

== See also ==
Romania

- List of international rankings
- List of Romania-related topics
- Member state of the European Union
- Member state of the North Atlantic Treaty Organization
- Member state of the United Nations
- Outline of Europe
- Outline of geography

(place the links from the following sections into the outline above)

Geography

- Protected areas
- Topography

Politics

- Administrative divisions
- Constitution
- Elections
- Foreign relations
- Government
- Human rights
  - LGBT
- LGBT history
- Judiciary
- Law enforcement
- Military
- Parliament
- Political parties
- Unification with Moldova

Economy

- Agriculture
- Energy
- Foreign investment
- Foreign trade
- Industry
  - automotive
  - construction
  - mining
  - petrochemical
- Leu (currency)
- National Bank
- Property bubble
- Science and technology
- Services
- Stock Exchange
- Telecommunications

Society

- Crime in Romania
- Immigration to Romania
- Languages in Romania
- Minorities of Romania
  - Hungarians in Romania
- Public holidays in Romania
- Social structure of Romania
- Systematization (Romania)
- Social welfare in Romania
