= Fauna of Romania =

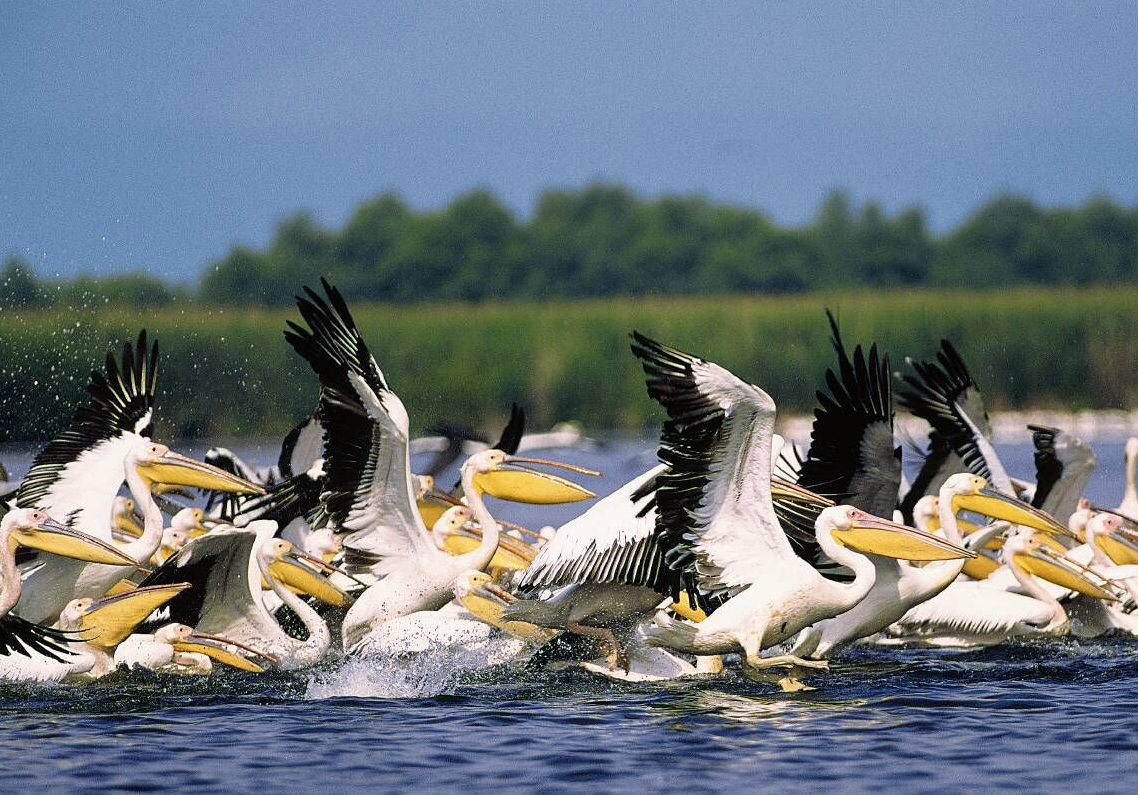
Great white pelicans in the Danube Delta

The fauna of Romania comprises all the animal species inhabiting the country of Romania and its coastal territory in the Black Sea.

== Vertebrates ==
According to a systematic list of the Romanian vertebrate fauna, there are 732 species of vertebrates living in Romania. When grouped into classes, the largest number of these species are birds, with 382 species, followed by fish with 184. 110 of these species are mammals, 31 are reptiles, 20 are amphibians, while only five belong to the Cyclostomata class of jawless fish.

=== Cyclostomata ===
The cyclostomata superclass of vertebrates is represented in Romania by five species of lampreys that live in fast, mountains streams. They are found particularly in Transylvania, in rivers such as Criș, Mureș, Someș and Vișeu.

=== Fish ===
==== Freshwater ====
Romania's rivers, lakes and ponds are home to numerous species of freshwater fish, most importantly carp, Prussian carp, chub, trout, perch, zander, bream, pike, roach and the wels catfish.

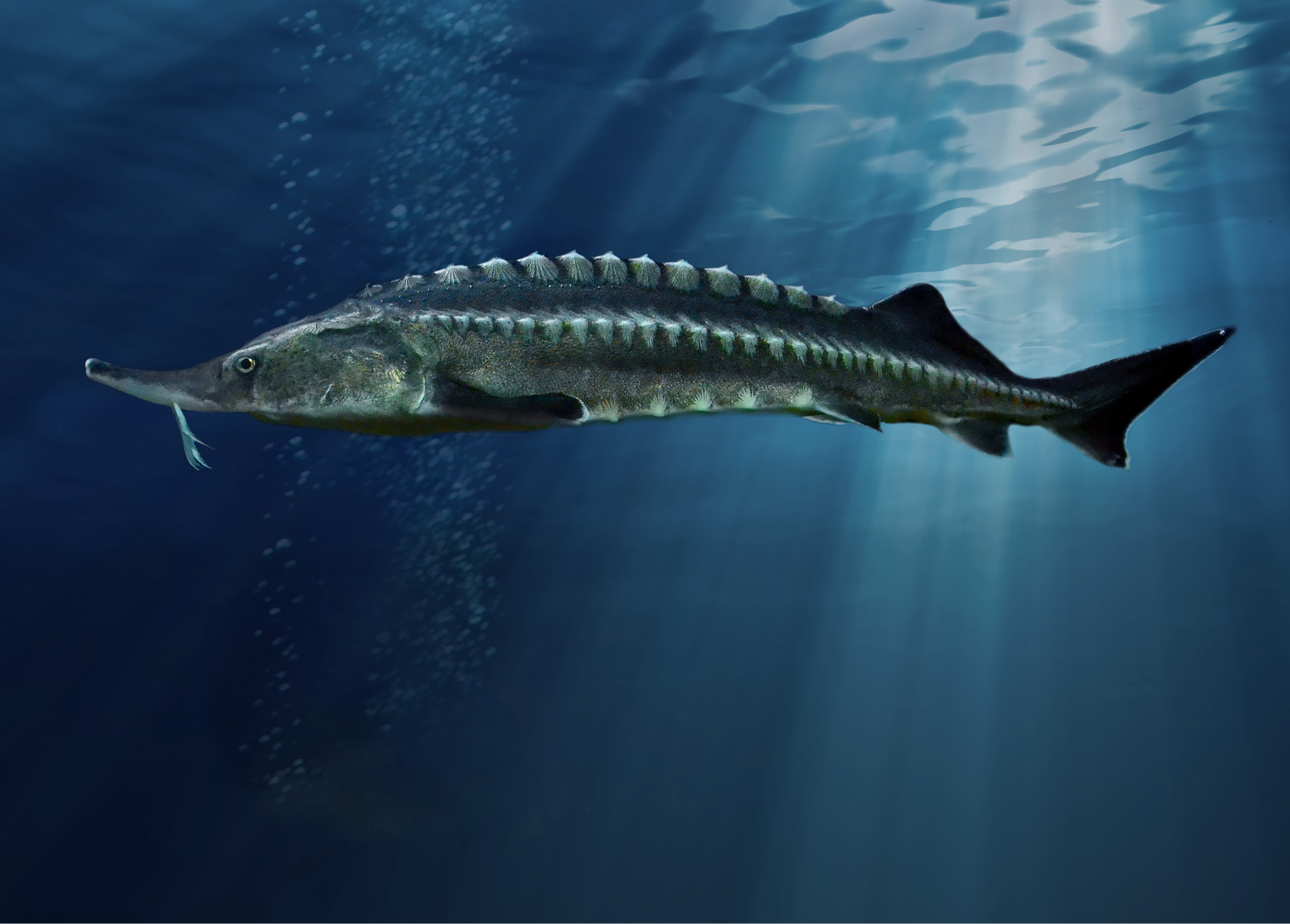
The beluga sturgeon is the largest freshwater fish in the world

Additionally, six species of sturgeon live in the Black Sea, but travel upriver on the Danube to mate. Five of the six Danube sturgeon species are critically endangered, with only the sterlet being considered vulnerable. The most well known of these six species is probably the beluga sturgeon, which is heavily fished for the female's valuable roe – known as beluga caviar.

Romania is also home to the asprete, a critically endangered species described by the media as a living fossil and "Europe's rarest fish". Once common in the waters of the Argeș river and its tributaries, Râul Doamnei and Vâlsan, by the 2000s it was only found to be extant in a 1 km stretch of the Vâlsan, with conservationists fearing that less than 10 individuals remained. Increased conservation and survey efforts led to a resurgence in the numbers of identified individuals, with a 2022 survey finding 58 asprete across a 15 km stretch of the Vâlsan.

==== Saltwater ====
The saltwater fish of Romania are the Black Sea species of fish that live in the territorial waters of Romania. A 2005 biodiversity inventory of the Romanian waters identified around 140 species and subspecies of marine fish. Many of the species have seen their stocks plummet in the last 50 years due to commercial exploitation. The six species that are the most commercially viable today are all small-sized fish: the red mullet, the Mediterranean sand smelt, the round goby, the European anchovy, the merling and the sprat.

According to recent reports, dozens of species of fish that were believed to be extinct in the Black Sea have reappeared in the area in the last few years, most likely travelling from the Mediterranean, due to the improved water quality and regeneration of the Black Sea ecosystem.

Other species that can be found on the Romanian coast include two rays, two sharks and dozens of teleostean fish.

=== Amphibians ===
The amphibian population of Romania includes more than a dozen species of frogs and toads, several species of newts and the fire salamander, out of which nine species are not found outside of Romania.

The most common amphibians are the common toad, the yellow-bellied toad, the European green toad, the agile frog and the smooth newt.

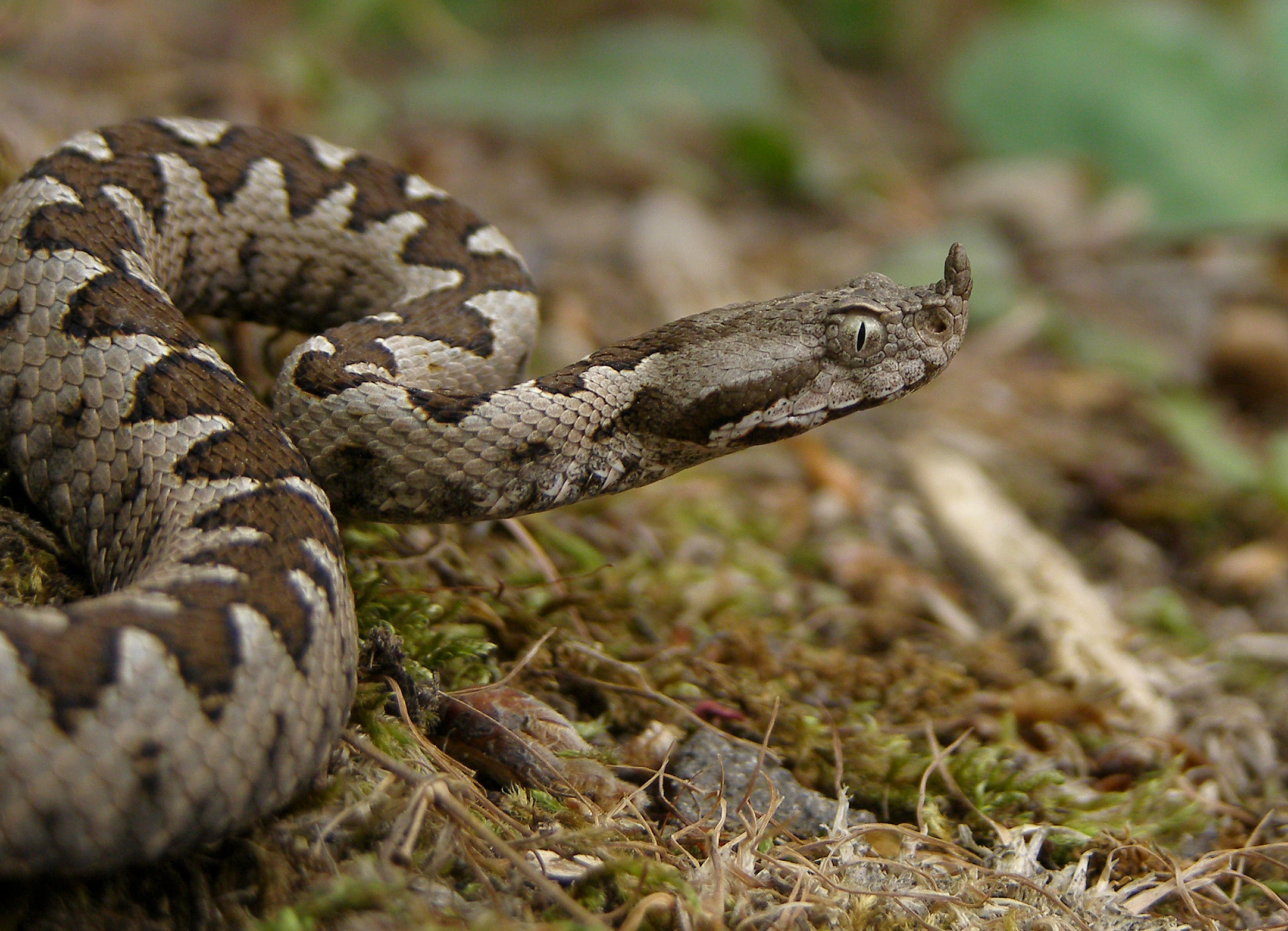
Known for its distinctive "horn", the long-nosed viper (Vipera ammodytes) is the most dangerous snake in Romania

=== Reptiles ===
There are ten species of snakes living in Romania, of which three, the common European viper, the meadow viper and the horned viper, are venomous. The horned viper in particular is considered to be extremely dangerous and possibly the most venomous snake in Europe.

The javeline sand boa, the rarest species of snake in Europe and the only species of boa on the continent, was believed extinct in Romania, with the last live specimen being reported in 1937. An entire stable population of the species was discovered by experts in 2014 along the banks of the Danube, with the exact location being kept a secret to avoid trophy hunting.

Four species of turtle and tortoise call Romania their home: The European pond turtle, the common tortoise, Hermann's tortoise and the marine loggerhead sea turtle. In recent years, a number of exotic species such as the Mississippi map turtle and even the Chinese softshell turtle were spotted in ponds and rivers around Bucharest, but their presence has not been extensively documented and their impact on the environment is not yet clearly understood.

Over a dozen species of lizard can be found in the country, with the most common one being the European green lizard and the common field lizard Lacerta agilis. While not yet present in Romania, the Pallas's glass lizard and Kotschy's gecko are considered likely to join the list of reptiles in Romania in the near future, both being present in Bulgaria, near the Romanian border.

=== Birds ===
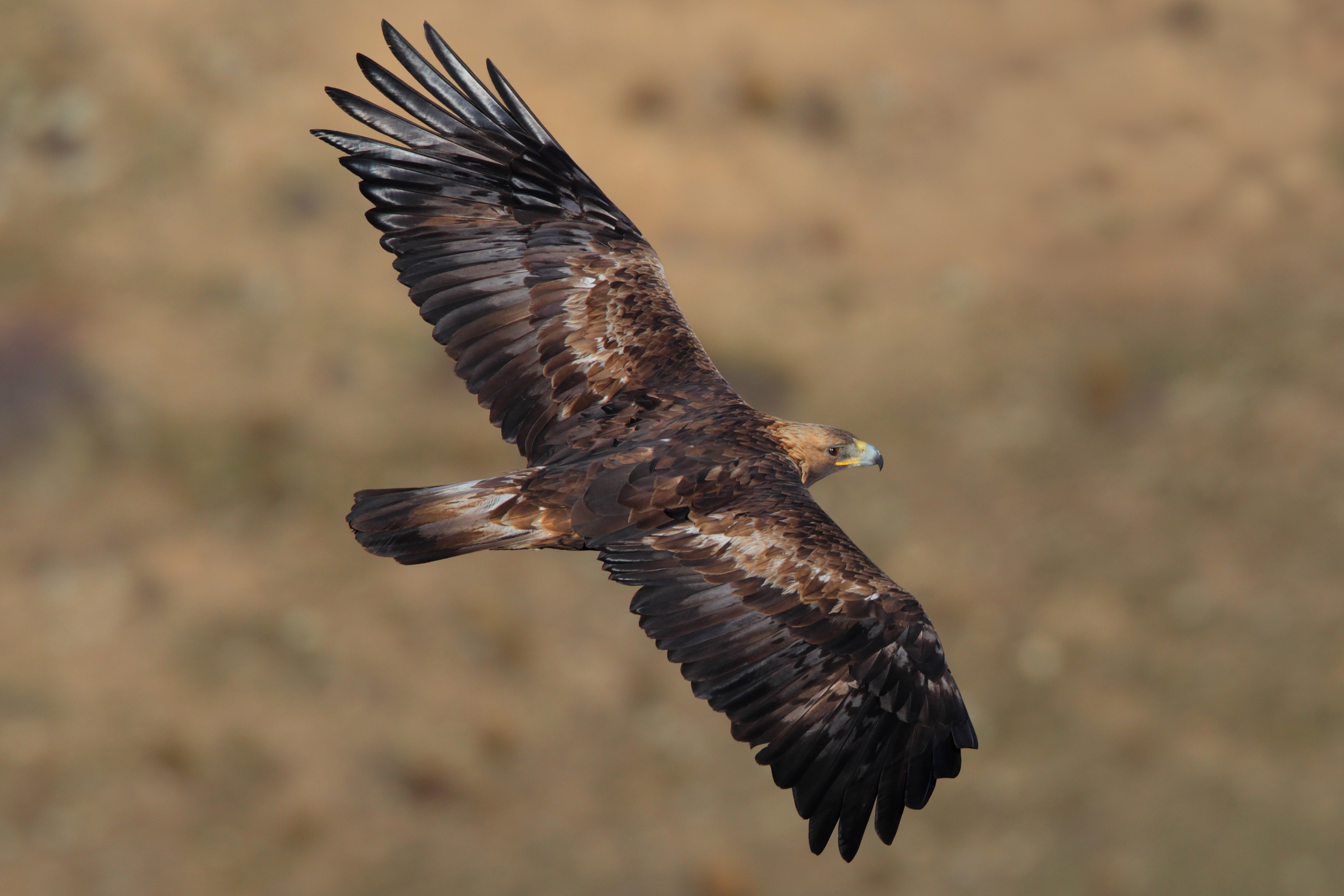
The golden eagle appears on the Romanian coat of arms

Romania is home to roughly two-dozen species of raptors (Accipitriformes), the order which includes the hawks, eagles, kites, and Old World vultures. The adjacent bird-of-prey groups, the falcons and kestrels (Falconiformes) and the owls (Strigiformes) each have about ten species represented in the country. The last bearded vulture, or llamergeier, in Romania was shot in Sibiu in 1927, with no other credible sightings of the bird until 2009. In 2016, researchers provided the first photographic evidence of bearded vulture activity in Romania after almost 90 years.

The water-dwelling birds of Romania are mainly concentrated in the lower Danube, in the Danube Delta, and the littoral area of the Black Sea. The Dobruja region, in general, and the Danube Delta, in particular, are hotspots for nesting migratory birds. These include numerous species of Anseriformes, such as ducks, geese, and swans, as well as cormorants, shags, herons, storks, ibises, pelicans and, seasonally, greater flamingos.

Several species of seagulls can be found not only on the coast, but hundreds of kilometres inland, as they follow waterways; as in many worldwide cities, they have become something of a pest in cities such as Bucharest and Brașov. The great white pelican is sometimes mentioned in the media as being the national bird of Romania, despite the lack of any official decision in this regard.

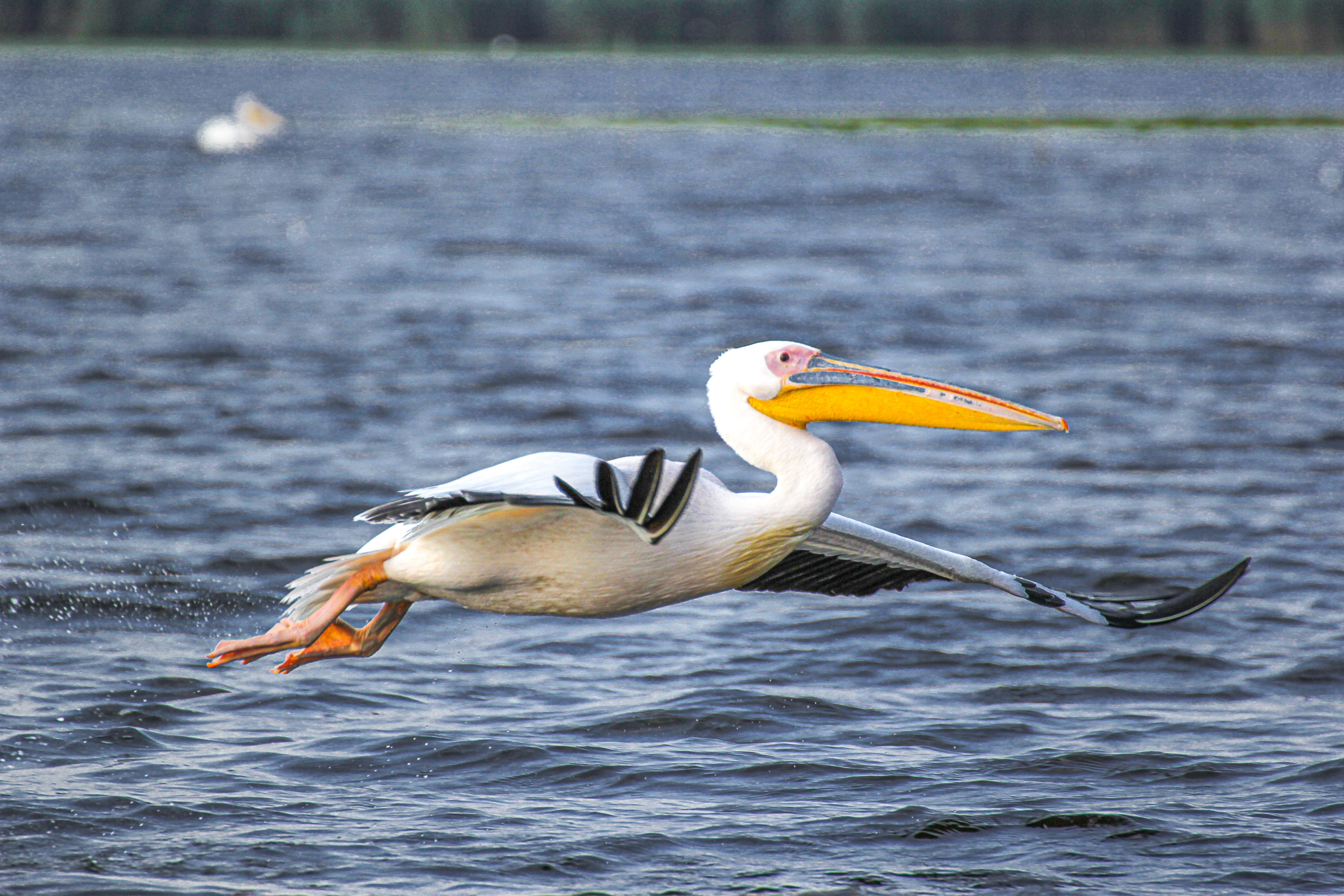
Great white pelican taking off from the water in the Danube Delta

Among passerine birds, the most numerous species in Romania is probably the chaffinch, with an estimated 5 million adults, followed by the European robin, the goldcrest, the great tit, the white wagtail, the song thrush, the red-backed shrike, and several species of sparrow.

The great bustard, the world's largest extant flying animal, was once common in Central and Southeast Romania until the early 20th century, when agrarian reform severely restricted its habitat. They were considered extinct in Romania, with no sightings between 1981 and 2002, but can now be found in two small, isolated groups in Bihor and Timiș counties, near the border with Hungary. The first proactive conservation measures affecting the great bustard populations in Western Romania began in 2018.

=== Mammals ===
==== Small mammals ====
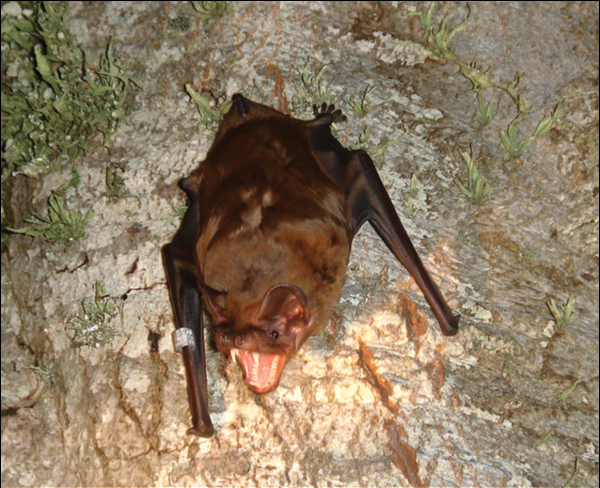
The greater noctule bat is Europe's largest species of bat. It is also among its most rare.

Rodents make up a large proportion of the mammals in Romania, especially in the low-lying plains. This includes species of hamsters, field mice, ground squirrels, voles, dormice, red squirrels, nutrias and beavers. Other common small mammals include shrews, rabbits, hedgehogs, polecats, martens and badgers.

The bat population in Romania is particularly plentiful with 32 species present in the country. The Huda lui Papară cave in the Trascău Mountains is home to the largest known bat colony in Europe, while the Topolnița Cave in Mehedinți hosts the largest colony of greater horseshoe bat on the continent. Several other caves display extraordinary biodiversity, with up to 20 species of bats living in the same cave system. Romania is also home to the greater noctule bat (Nyctalus lasiopterus), a rare species that is Europe's largest and least studied bat, as well as probably its most threatened. It is a carnivorous bat that feeds on insects, but was also found to consume "large numbers of migratory passerines", making it the sole bat species known to regularly prey on birds.

==== Megafauna ====
===== Herbivores and omnivores =====
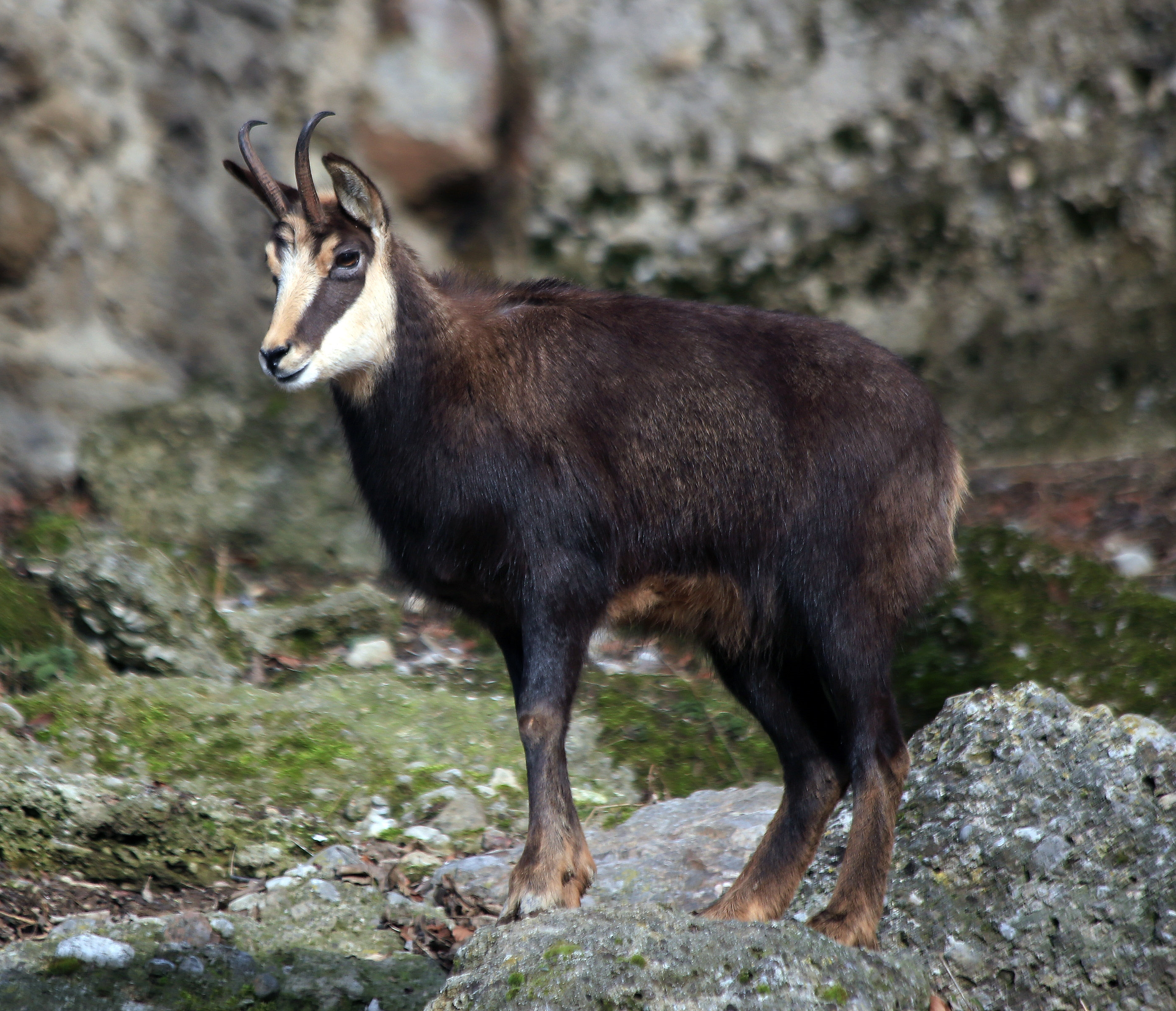
The chamois has been the subject of some of the most robust conservation efforts in Romania

Large species of non-carnivorous mammals in Romania include the Carpathian boar, fallow deer, red deer, roe deer and the chamois. The endangered saiga antelope was once common in Moldavia and Eastern Wallachia, but has gone all but extinct in the 18th century. Today only a few specimens survive in a small natural reserve in the north-eastern county of Botoșani. The chamois is a protected species in Romania and is the subject of several conservation efforts.

The European bison, the largest European land mammal, became extinct in the region in the 18th century, However, in 1958, Romania began the reintroduction of the bison into its nature reserves. In the 21st century, Romania also began reintroducing the European bison in the wild, the ninth country to do so as part of a continent-wide effort that saw the total number of bison in Europe go from 54 captive individuals in 1927 to more than 7000 in 2018. In 2022, there were over 200 bison living in wild or semi-wild areas in regions of Romania.

Romania is also home to the Danube Delta horses, a population of feral horses that has lived for hundreds of years in and around Letea Forest in the Danube Delta and is possibly the last sizable population of wild horses in Europe. After collective farms were closed in the 1990s, the population was supplanted by freed horses and by the beginning of the 21st century, it increased to around 4,000 individuals, turning them into a threat to the protected flora of the region. Following media and public outrage in 2011, authorities walked back on the initial plan of killing the horses and the population is now controlled through birth-control vaccines.

===== Carnivores =====
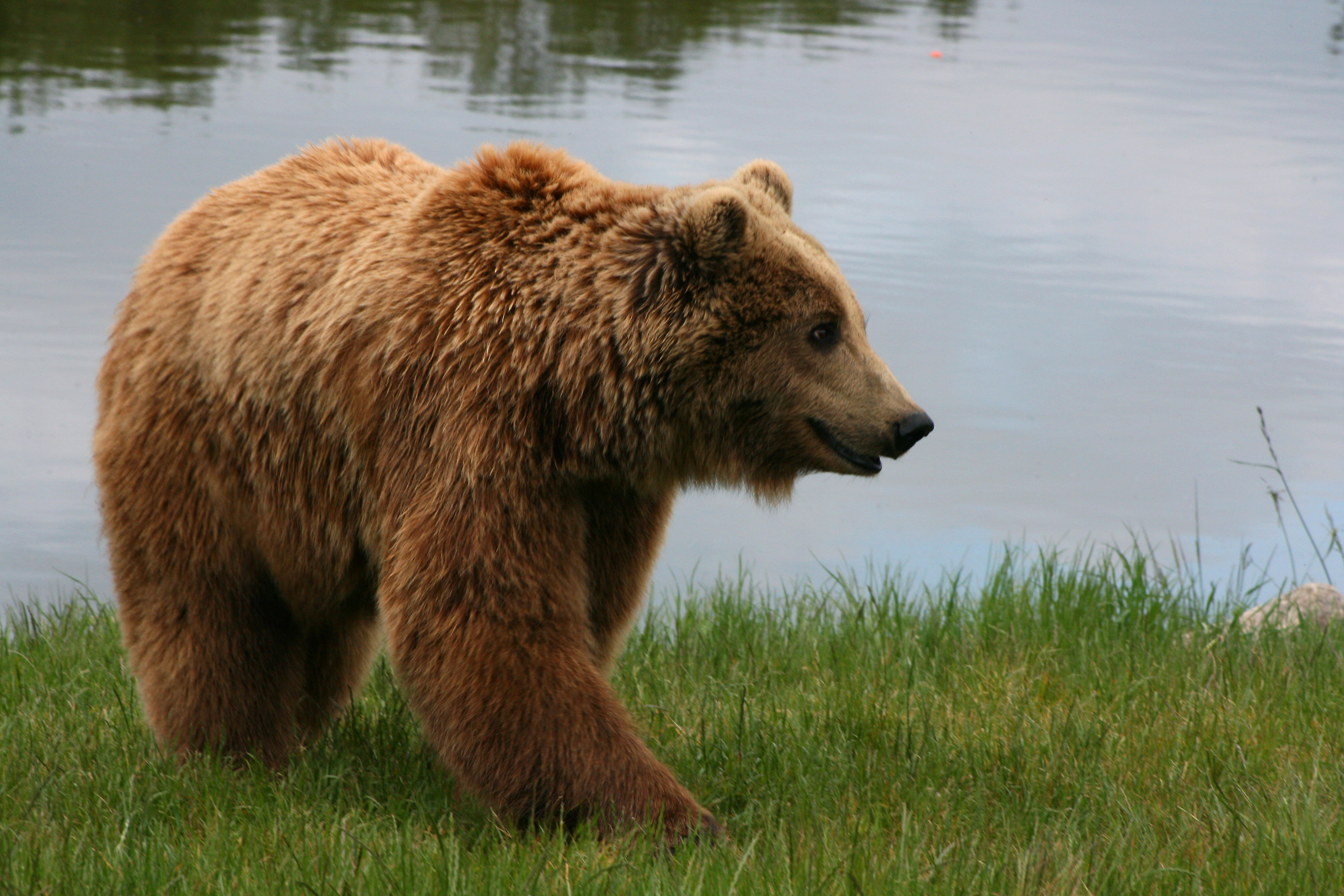
Over 6000 brown bears live in Romania

The large carnivores living in Romania are the European wildcat, the Eurasian lynx, the red fox, the golden jackal, the grey wolf and the brown bear. Lions were once present in the countries southeast but were extirpated in the Bronze Age.

There are over 6,000 brown bears living in Romania, in one of the largest concentrations in Europe. Because of the increasing number of interactions with settled areas, including a number of attacks, but also because the "optimum size of the population of brown bear, from an ecological, social and economic point of view" is around 4,000, the Romanian government announced plans in 2018 for a culling of about 2000 of the country's brown bears. This measured was met with hostility by many conservationist organisations and the public.

==== Marine mammals ====
One species of porpoise (Phocoena phocoena) and several species of dolphins live in the Black Sea off the coast of Romania. While the endangered Mediterranean monk seal still appears in the Black Sea, it has not been recorded in Romanian waters for several decades.

==== New arrivals ====
Several non-native species of mammals were introduced to Romania during the 20th century. Among these the most notable are the East-Asian raccoon dog, which spread to Europe through the USSR and was first seen in Romania in 1951, the European mouflon, which was introduces starting with 1966 in game reserves and later in the wilderness, and the North-American muskrat, which was introduced to Romania accidentally, after individuals which escaped captivity in Czech and Russian farms spread across the continent around the middle of the century.

== Conservation challenges ==
Due to the low level of conservation research done in Romania and the rapid pace of environmental changes that the country has gone through in the last decades, there is no definitive list of endangered species in Romania. According to a 2013 paper on biodiversity,

The incomplete and biased species inventory in Romania may have several causes: difficult access due to low road density, complex landscape (with 15% of the territory above 800 m), limited funds available for large-scale inventory and monitoring projects, and lack of institutional support. For instance, no species distribution databases are publicly available at the Romanian Ministry of the Environment

Some species, such as the chamois, the Eurasian lynx, the European bison, the wood grouse and the Danube salmon have been the subject of high-profile conservation efforts and are protected by national laws.

=== Alien species ===
A 2017 study identified 390 alien species of terrestrial animals (of which 90% are invertebrates) and 102 species of aquatic organisms (44 freshwater and 58 marine) in Romania. Most of these originate in North America and Southeast Asia and have been introduced accidentally. Despite being a signatory of the Berne Convention on the Conservation of European Wildlife and Natural Habitats, Romania is behind many other countries when it comes to protecting its ecosystems from invasive alien species. There is currently no official list of alien species or invasive species provided by the Romanian Ministry of Environment.

Some of the invasive alien species, such as the veined rapa whelk, the sea walnut or the soft-shell clam have been well documented, but the impact of most invasive species on the Romanian ecosystems has not been properly researched, with serious academic research into the topic only beginning within the last decade.

== See also ==
- List of birds of Romania
- List of mammals of Romania
- List of fishes of the Black Sea
- Outline of Romania
