= Services in Romania =

Economic overview

In 2003, the service sector constituted 55% of gross domestic product (GDP), and the sector employed 62.6(cia.gov)% of the workforce. The subcomponents of services are financial, renting, and business activities (20.5%); trade, hotels and restaurants, and transport (18%); and other service activities (21.7%).

The service sector in Romania is vast and multifaceted, employing some three quarters of Romanians and accounting for two thirds of GDP. The largest employer is the retail sector, employing almost 12% of Romanians. The retail industry is mainly concentrated in a relatively small number of chain stores clustered together in shopping malls. In recent years the rise of big-box stores, such as Cora (hypermarket) (of the France) and Carrefour (a subsidiary of the French), have led to fewer workers in this sector and a migration of retail jobs to the suburbs.

The second largest portion of the service sector is the business services, employing only a slightly smaller percentage of the population. This includes the financial services, real estate, and communications industries. This portion of the economy has been rapidly growing in recent years. It is largely concentrated in the major urban centres, especially Bucharest (see Banking in Romania).

The education and health sectors are two of Romania's largest, but both are largely under the purview of the government. The health care industry has been rapidly growing, and is the third largest in Romania. Its rapid growth has led to problems for governments who must find money to fund it.

Romania has an important high tech industry, and also an entertainment industry creating content both for local and international consumption. Tourism is of ever increasing importance, with the vast majority of international visitors coming from the EU, though the recent strength of the Romanian leu has damaged this sector.

== Tourism ==
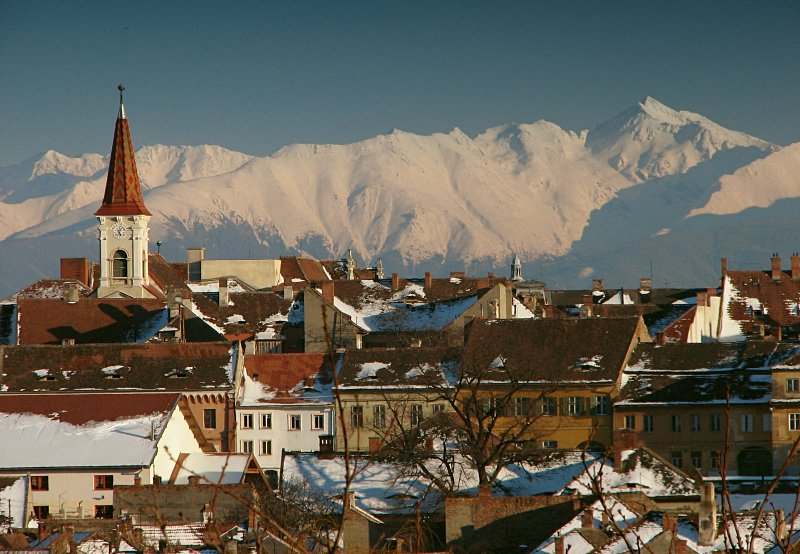
Sibiu, the 2007 European Capital of Culture

Tourism is a significant contributor to the Romania Economy. In the 1990s the government heavily promoted the development of skiing in the Romanian Carpathians. Domestic and international tourism generates about 6% of gross domestic product (GDP) and 0.8 million jobs. Following commerce, tourism is the second largest component of the services sector. In 2006 Romania registered 20 million overnight stays by international tourists, 4% higher than in the previous year and an all-time record. Two-thirds of all major trade fairs from Central Europe are held in Romania, and each year they attract 2 to 3 million business travelers, about 20% of whom are foreigners. The four most important trade fairs take place in Bucharest, Cluj-Napoca, Iaşi, Timișoara.

In the year 2007, 7,722,000 tourists vacationed in Romania. The total revenue was $2.1 billion and with an average expenditure of $300 per tourist. Over the years, Romania has emerged as a popular tourist destination for many Europeans, often competing with Greece, Italy and Spain. Romania destinations such as Constanța and Mamaia (sometimes called the Romanian Riviera) have become very popular among European tourists.

Romania has a highly developed tourism infrastructure, making it a good market for tourism-related equipment and services.

In 2006 it is reported that the hotel and restaurant industry added gross value of $8,074 million to the Romanian economy in 2005.

== Banking and finance ==
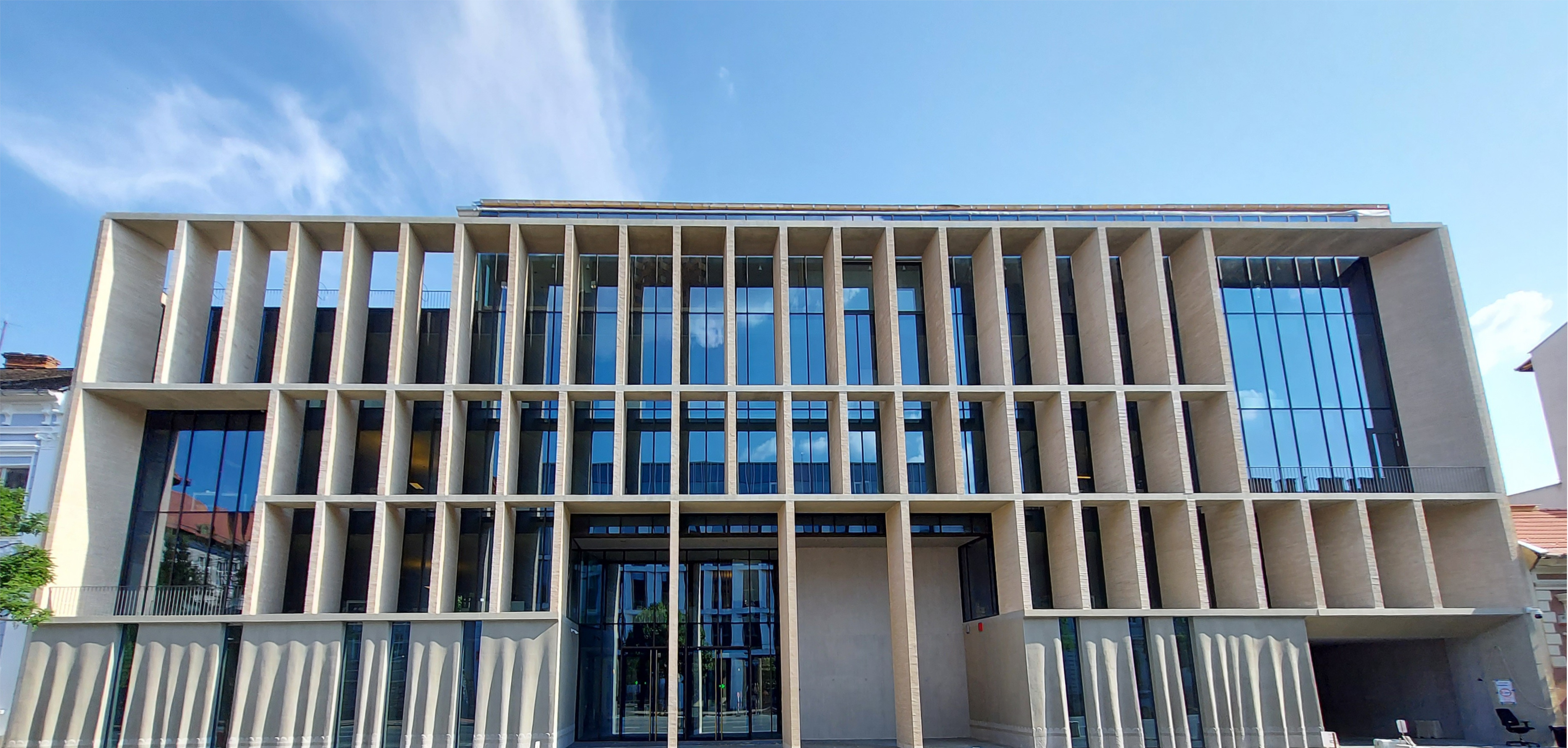
Headquarters of Banca Transilvania in Cluj-Napoca (right). To the left headquarters of the county branch of BCR

Romania's capital is Bucharest. The City of Bucharest is Bucharest's major financial district, and one of the regional's leading financial centres. The city is where the Bucharest Stock Exchange, as well as many other exchanges, are based. Service industries, particularly banking, insurance, and business services, account by far for the largest proportion of GDP and employ around 55% of the working population. Many other international banks are beginning to operate bases in Romania, as the sector expands. In 2007 there were 52 banks.

In the first four years of the twenty-first century, Romania's BET Index was the best-performing stock market index in the world as declared by the international magazine Business Week.

The stock market capitalisation of listed companies in Romania was valued at $56 billion in 2008 by the World Bank. As a result, the corporate sector of Romania has grown dramatically in significance in recent times.

== See also ==
- Supermarkets in Romania
