= Welfare in Romania =

Topic in Romanian government

Social welfare (Romanian: ajutor social) in Romania is coordinated by the Romanian Ministry of Labor, Family and Social Protection. The system is funded from the state budget. There are roughly fifty types of welfare a Romanian citizen can receive. In 2015, it was estimated that 7 million Romanians receive some form of welfare benefits. In 2017, the budget granted for social welfare at the ministerial level was of 35.71 billion lei (€8.5 billion).

== History ==
The Ministry of Labor, Family and Social Protection was created in 1920, after World War I. The purpose of the ministry was to reorganize the social classes and provide aid for the poor in the Kingdom of Romania. The system worked even during World War II, as the King of Romania himself encouraged the concept of social welfare.

After the war ended and the Communist regime came to power, Romania became a socialist state, and therefore social welfare became widespread.

In 1990, after the fall of the communist regime, the whole system was reformed. It was divided into multiple categories, and the concept of generalized social welfare was reduced.

== Today ==
Social welfare is subdivided into multiple categories.

=== Healthcare ===
See article Healthcare in Romania.

=== Child care ===
Maternity care is free in Romania. As soon as mothers give birth, they are entitled to vacation time and receive aid which amounts to 85% of their net income without a limit being set. After the age of two, children receive an allowance up until the age of 18, although they must attend school to be eligible.

Education in Romania is free and compulsory until age 16, when children are eligible for part-time work. Free school meals are provided for all children, and there is no requirement that parents or guardians pay for class supplies. Children up until the age of 18 also receive subsidies for public transportation to and from school.

=== Adults ===
Adults are entitled to certain kinds of welfare, the most widespread being subsidies for heat and electricity, provided through municipalities who receive funding from the Ministry of Labor. In 2012 it was noted that funding for this welfare had been reduced and those previously in receipt of aid no longer eligible, unless the applicant earned below a certain income level.

Adults are also eligible for unemployment aid, the amount varying from case to case, but generally comparable to the minimum wage (800 RON). Unemployment aid may be granted if the applicant has contributed and if they can prove they are actively seeking a job. It is granted on a time-limited, individually determined basis.

There is also a subsidy available for funeral arrangements amounting to 2000 RON, and given regardless of the circumstances. To be eligible for assistance, a death certificate is required.

=== Disability ===
People with disabilities also receive welfare. The amount depends on an individual's assessed disability and is normally granted until the end of life, or until the disability has been successfully treated. It has been discovered that some beneficiaries of disability welfare are not truly disabled. Consequently, the potential for fraudulent claims has sparked debate in Romania.

=== Elderly ===
A pension is provided by the state. Women retire at the age of 62, and men at 65. The pension is granted regardless of whether contributions are made. The minimum pension given is 350 RON, increasing in proportion to contributions made during working life. Some retirees have pensions in excess of the median salary, however one third live off a pension equal to or under the minimum wage. Retirees also receive subsidies for public transportation.

== Controversy ==
One in two Romanians receive welfare and are commonly pejoratively referred to as "socially assisted" (asistați social) by taxpayers. It is estimated that 1.8 million people are receiving welfare while not legally eligible.

Since the economical crisis, the state has cut welfare. In consequence where there are suspicions of fraud, committees are established to check the validity of claims.

The large number of welfare grants available from both local, county and national authorities is frequently the target of criticism.
