= Social structure of Romania =

The following is a description of the social structure of Romania divided into three distinct categories.

== Kingdom of Romania (before 1947) ==
Before World War II, Romania was primarily agrarian; in the late 1940s, about three-quarters of the population were engaged in subsistence agriculture from ever-shrinking plots of land (due to an increasing rural population). Although some industrial activity was encouraged by state contracts and foreign investment, industrial development was slow and failed to create alternative employment opportunities for the overpopulated and impoverished countryside. Atop the low social pyramid stood a disproportionately powerful social elite, a remnant of the nobility that had once owned most of the land in the Kingdom of Romania (1881–1947). Although reforms between 1917 and 1921 had left them with only 15% of the arable land, this aristocracy retained a powerful voice in political affairs.

== Communist era (1947–1989) ==
After World War II, Romania's social structure was drastically altered by the imposition of a political system envisioning a classless, egalitarian society. Marxist-Leninist doctrine holds that the establishment of a socialist state (in which the working class possesses the means of production and distribution of goods and political power) will ensure the eventual development of communism. Under communism, there would be no class conflict or exploitation of man by his fellow man. There would be an abundance of wealth, shared equally by all. The road to communism requires the primacy of the working class and the elimination of the ruling class and bourgeoisie. In Romania the latter was easily accomplished, but most of the population were peasants and not workers.

The Communist government (imposed by the Soviet Union in 1945) eliminated opposition to their consolidation of power by appeals to the working class. Disruption caused by World War II assisted the new government; much of the ruling elite had either emigrated or been killed, and many survivors left with the retreating German forces as the Red Army approached. Most Jews (who had constituted a large segment of the communal and financial elite before the war) either died in fascist Romania or fled the country over the next few years.

Measures taken during the early days of communist rule eradicated what remained of the upper crust. Land reforms in 1945 eliminated large holdings, depriving the aristocracy of their power and economic base. The currency reform of 1947 (which essentially confiscated all money for the state) was ruinous for members of the commercial and industrial bourgeoisie who had not fled with their fortunes. The state also expropriated commercial and industrial properties; by 1950 90% of all industrial output was state-controlled, and by 1953 only 14% of shops were privately owned.

Although opposition from the more economically and socially advanced members of society was eliminated almost immediately, the task of creating an industrial working class (in whose name the communists claimed power) had just begun. In 1950, less than 25% of the population lived in cities or worked in factories. Conditions in the countryside, however, were poised for change in the direction the regime required. The war and Soviet occupation had left the peasantry starving, with much of their livestock and capital destroyed. Their problems were compounded by a drought in 1945–1946, followed by a famine in which thousands died. More important for the regime, many of the peasants became detached from the land and were willing to work in factory jobs resulting from the Communist Party's industrialization program.

== Post-communism (1990–present) ==
From the late 1970s to the 1980s there was a growing economic crisis, leading to a sharp decline in living standards. The response by Nicolae Ceaușescu, which made liberal use of austerity, led to heightened societal tensions and even worse conditions for working people. In December 1989, the government headed by Nicolae Ceaușescu was forcibly overthrown, with rioting in Bucharest.
