= Romanian =

Romanian may refer to:

- anything of, from, or related to the country and nation of Romania
  - Romanians, an ethnic group
  - Romanian language, a Romance language
    - Romanian dialects, variants of the Romanian language
  - Romanian cuisine, traditional foods
  - Romanian folklore
- The Romanian: Story of an Obsession, a 2004 novel by Bruce Benderson
- Românul (lit. 'The Romanian'), a newspaper published in Bucharest, Romania, 1857–1905
