= Foreign direct investment in Romania =

Investment in Romania's economy from abroad

Foreign direct investment (FDI) in Romania has increased dramatically. As of 2022, Romania's foreign direct investment (FDI) stock reached nearly €108 billion, marking its highest value to date. Cheap and skilled labor force, low taxes, a 16% flat tax for corporations and individuals, no dividend taxes, liberal labor code and a favorable geographical location are Romania's main advantages for foreign investors. FDI has grown by 600% since 2000 to around $13.6 billion or $2,540 per capita by the end of 2004. In October 2005 new investment stimuli introduced – more favorable conditions to IT and research centers, especially to be located in the east part of the country (where is more unemployment), to bring more added value and not to be logistically demanding.

== Introduction ==
Origin of direct foreign investment 1996-2005 – the Netherlands 24.3%; Germany 19.4%, Austria 14.1%; Italy 7.5%, United States (8th largest investor) 4.0%. Top investors from countries, by companies: Erste Bank (Austria), OMV (Austria), Gaz de France (France), Orange (France), Vodafone (United Kingdom), Ford (United States), MOL (Hungary), Enel (Italy), E.ON (Germany), Nokia (Finland) ... General Motors considers Romania for plant.

== Nokia investment in Romania ==
General Motors could shortly begin investments in order to develop a production centre in Romania, with Cluj-Napoca as a potential location for the future plant, close to the Nokia Village. Nokia invested $110 mn in a plant near Cluj-Napoca. SABMiller is set to invest EUR50m (US$69m) in expanding production at one of its breweries in Romania (Ursus). Czech-based investor and developer CTP Invest plans to allocate EUR 60 mln next year in industrial property development in Romania. Snowmobile and motorcycle maker Polaris will invest 50 million euros ($69.41 million) in a snowmobile plant in Romania.

Sectors of direct foreign investment - industry 38.4%; banking and insurance 22.2%; wholesale and retail trade 13.1%; production of electricity, gas and water 10.5%; transportation and telecommunications 9.2%.

== "Invest in Romania" ==
"Invest in Romania" is an initiative of the Romanian Economy Ministry's International Trade Administration to promote foreign direct investment to Romania.

=== Activities ===
The Ministry of Commerce's global network provides the platform to educate international investors on the advantages that come with investing in Romania.

The initiative is focused on outreach to the international investment community.

More specifically, Invest in Romania welcomes all inquiries and is equipped to serve as a foreign investor's first point of contact for an investment in Romania. Initial meetings may involve gaining information about the Romanian economy as a whole, making contacts with appropriate agencies, and discussing Romania policies and basic investment procedures.

Invest in Romania can provide all potential investors an investment contact list encompassing all Romanian companies. This comprehensive guide provides the economic development point of contact within each state who has been designated by each Governor to field international investment inquiries.

In addition to helping foreign investors locate in the Romania, Invest in Romania works across various agencies to act as a voice within the federal bureaucracy to ensure the United States remains the premier location for foreign direct investment. Through its ombudsman role, Invest in Romania also supports potential and current foreign investors with regard to difficulties encountered within the bureaucracy.

Invest in Romania complements the work of state governments. The one activity the initiative will not undertake is to steer prospective investors toward or away from any particular location in Romania. The initiative promotes Romania in general as a site for investment.

== Benefits of foreign direct investment ==
- The total stock of FDI in the Romania in 2006 totaled 34,512 billion, or the equivalent of nearly 30% of the Romania GDP in the same year.

== See also ==
- Economy of Romania
