= Regions of Romania (disambiguation) =

The regions of Romania can refer to the:

- Development regions of Romania, formed in 1998 to assist in regional development for the preparation of Romania's accession to the European Union
- Historical regions of Romania
- Regions of the People's Republic of Romania
