= Languages of Romania =

- Official: Romanian (>90%)
- Minority: Albanian, Hungarian, Romani, Ukrainian, German, Greek, Russian, Turkish, Tatar, Serbian, Slovak, Bulgarian, Croatian, Italian, Yiddish
- Foreign: English (31%); French (17%); Italian (7%)
- Signed: Romanian Sign Language
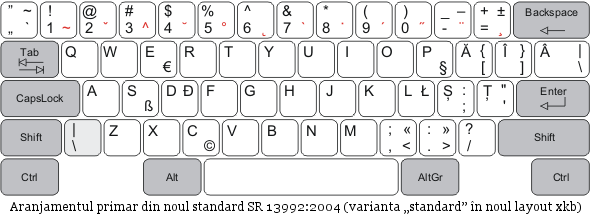
- Keyboard layout: Romanian keyboard layout

Beyond the official Romanian language, multiple other languages are spoken in Romania. Laws regarding the rights of minority languages are in place, and some of them have co-official status at a local level. Although having no native speakers, French is also historically important, and the country is a member of the Organisation internationale de la Francophonie.

== Official language ==
According to the 2002 Romanian Census, Romanian is spoken by 91% of the population as a primary language. According to the Romanian Constitution and the law 1206 of 2006 the official language in Romania is Romanian both at the national and local level.

Officially and since 2013, the Romanian language has its own holiday, the Romanian Language Day, celebrated in Romania on every 31 August. This holiday is officially celebrated in Moldova on the same day since 2023.

== Minority languages ==
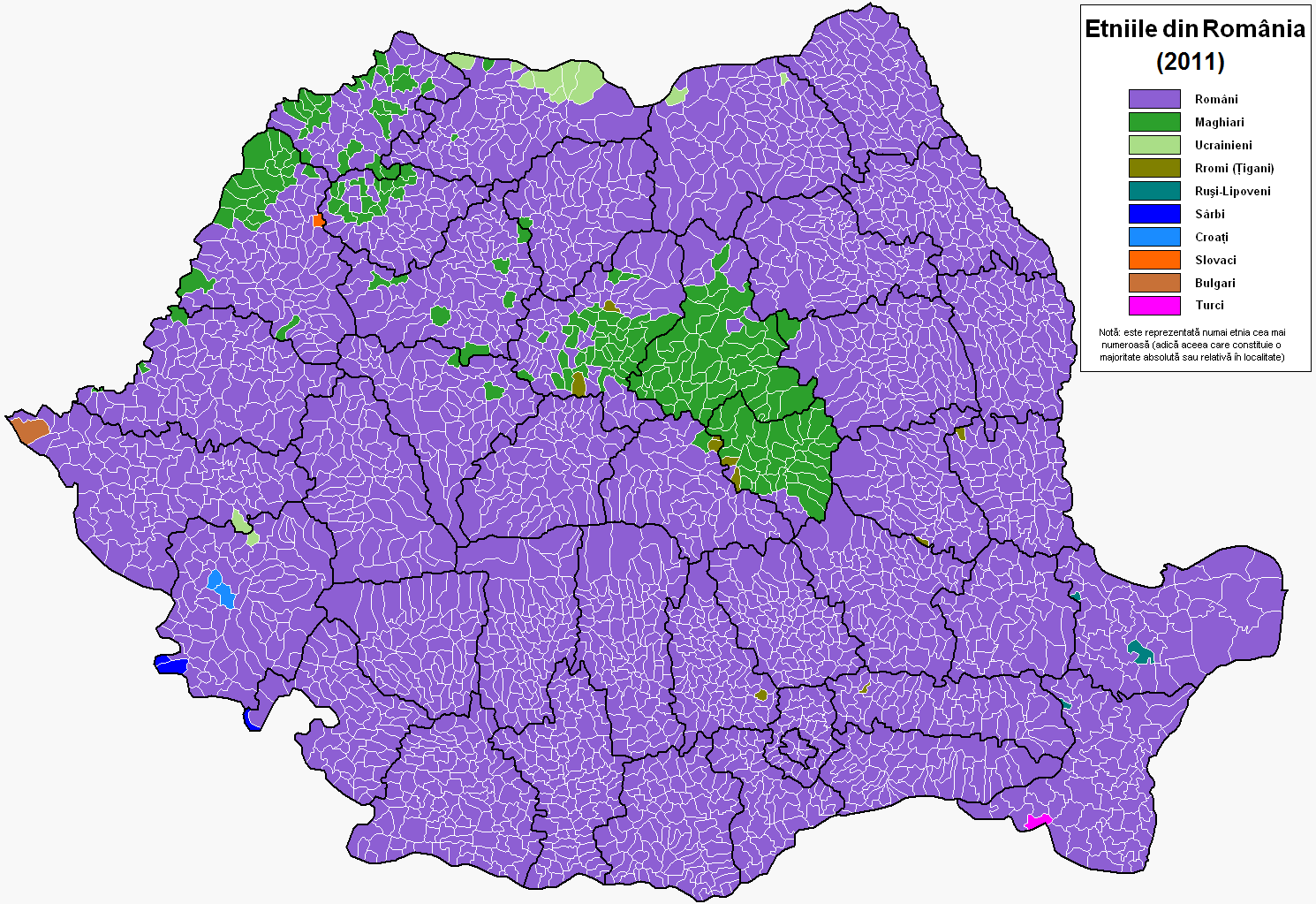
Ethnic composition of Romania. Localities with a Hungarian majority or plurality are shown in dark green.

After the fall of Romania's communist government in 1989, the various minority languages have received more rights, and Romania currently has extensive laws relating to the rights of minorities to use their own language in local administration and the judicial system.

While Romanian is the only official language at the national and local level, there are over 30 living languages identified as being spoken within Romania (5 of these are indigenous). The Romanian laws include linguistic rights for all minority groups that form over 20% of a locality's population based on the census from 1992. The list of such localities appears in the Government Decision nr. 1206/2001. This includes the adoption of signage in minority languages, access to local administration, public services and justice systems. The right to receive education in that language is not restricted only to these settlements.

=== Hungarian ===
Hungarian is the largest minority language in Romania: the 2011 census listed 1,227,623 native Hungarian speakers in the country, or 6.1% of the total population. This minority largely lives in Transylvania, which was part of the Kingdom of Hungary until the end of World War I. (Northern Transylvania was part of Hungary again between 1940 and 1947) though there are Hungarian speaking minorities in other parts of the country as well.

=== Romani ===
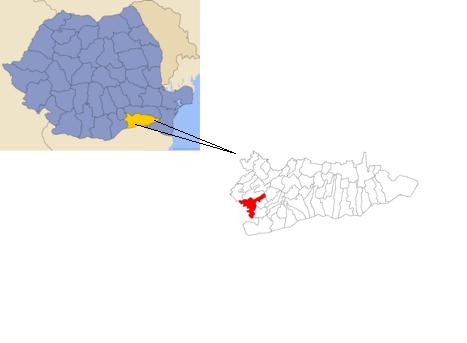
The location of Budești within Călărași County and of Călărași County within Romania.

Roma make up the second largest minority in Romania and 241,617 Romani speakers were reported in the 2002 census, or 1.1% of the total population. Dialects of Romani spoken include Balkan Romani, Vlax Romani, and Carpathian Romani. Romani is used in local signage, administration, education and justice in 79 communes and one town (Budești).

=== Ukrainian ===
There are 57,593 Ukrainian speakers in Romania, mostly concentrated in Maramureș County, where they make up 6.67% of the population, but also in Suceava and Timiș counties. Ukrainians make up the majority in four communes: Bistra, Maramureș, Rona de Sus, Știuca and Copăcele.

=== German ===
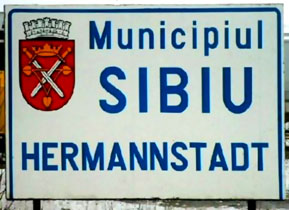
German/Romanian signage in Sibiu (known as Hermannstadt in German), home of the Transylvanian Landler.

There are many different groups of Germans in Romania, the largest of whom have historically been known as the Transylvanian Saxons and the Banat Swabians. Germans once constituted a much larger portion of the Romanian population than they do today, though they are still the fourth largest ethno-linguistic group. In 1938 there were 780,000, and in 1992 there were 111,301, but the 2002 census reported only 45,129 Germans. Since 1989 they have been represented by the Democratic Forum of Germans in Romania, which functions in the German language.

=== Russian ===
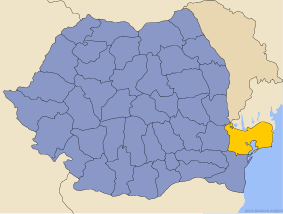
Tulcea County, where most Romanian Lipovans live.

There are 29,890 Lipovans, ethnically Russian emigrants from the Russian Empire who left because of religious differences with the Russian Orthodox Church, in Romania. They mostly speak the Russian language, and most live in Tulcea County.

=== Turkic languages ===
==== Turkish ====
Turkish speakers make up 0.1% of the population, with a community of some 28,714 speakers. The Turkish speaking community is largely a legacy of the Ottoman rule of a large part of Romania. They live in the east parts of Romania (Constanța). There is also a very small group of Gagauz people, maybe a few hundreds, who still speak the Gagauz language.

==== Tatar ====
Tatars also make up roughly 0.1% of the Romanian population, with a community of 21,482 speakers. Most Crimean Tatars speak the Crimean Tatar language, and the greater part of the community lives in Constanța County.

=== Other languages ===
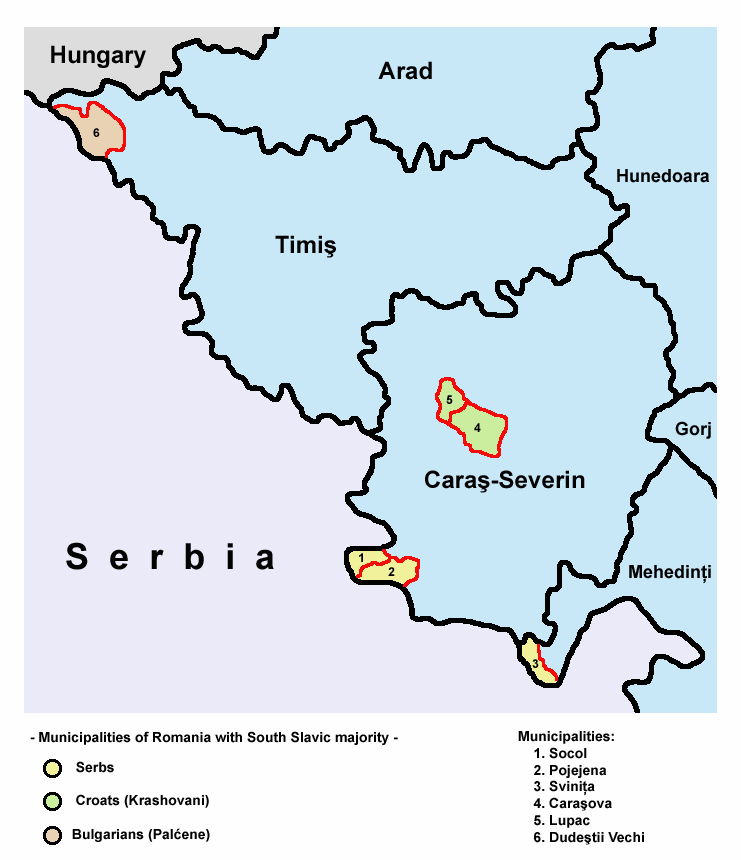
Communities of South Slavs in Romania

Lesser spoken languages in Romania include: Serbo-Croatian (26,732: 20,377 Serbians, 6,355 Croatians), Slovak (16,108), Bulgarian (6,747), Greek (4,146).

The use of French developed among Romanian elites from the 18th century. Patrick Leigh Fermor, who visited Romania in 1934, noted that although the elites were all bilingual, their mother tongue was French, "of a particularly pure, cool, and charming kind." Today around a quarter of Romanians have studied French. Since 1993, Romania has been a member of Organisation internationale de la Francophonie despite not having a native French-speaking population or ever being part of any French empire.

== See also ==
- Italians in Romania
