= List of supermarket chains in Romania =

The concept of modern, big and self-service store came to Romania in mid-1990s. Since mid-2000s, there has been a strong growth in the number of supermarkets in the country, particularly in Bucharest and other main urban areas. Almost all supermarkets are owned by multinational companies. This is a list of major retailers in Romania in 2022.

Name	Stores	Type	Parent
Carrefour; Carrefour Market; Carrefour Express; Supeco	57; 188; 162; 29	Hypermarkets; Supermarkets; Convenience stores Discount supermarkets	Carrefour Group
Auchan MyAuchan	33; 7; 392	Hypermarkets; Supermarkets; Convenience stores	Auchan Holding (Mulliez Family)
Kaufland	190	Discount hypermarkets	Schwarz Gruppe
Lidl	377	Discount supermarkets	Schwarz Gruppe
Penny	423	Discount supermarkets	REWE Group
Profi; Profi City	1,769	Supermarkets, Convenience stores	Ahold Delhaize
Mega Image; Shop&Go; Gusturi Românești	955	Supermarkets; Convenience stores Romanian products shops	Ahold Delhaize
Metro	30	Cash & carry stores (only for professionals)	Metro AG
La Doi Pași	2,500+	Minimarkets	Metro AG
Succes Nic Com	200 (as of 2013)	Supermarkets, Convenience stores	
Selgros	23	Cash & carry stores (for natural individuals & professionals)	TransGourmet
La Cocoș	7	Cash & carry stores (for natural individuals & professionals)	Schwarz Gruppe

== See also ==
- List of supermarket chains
