= Results of the 2022 Swedish general election =

The 2022 Swedish general election was held on 11 September to determine the 349 seats of Sweden's parliament, the Riksdag, for the term lasting until 2026. The opposition right-wing bloc won a majority of seats and later formed the Tidö Agreement. The agreement paved the way to the Kristersson cabinet, a minority government of Ulf Kristersson's Moderate Party, the Christian Democrats, and Liberals that relies on confidence and supply from the Sweden Democrats (SD), the first time the party is holding direct influence on government policy.

== Results ==
As of 15 September 2022, the results remained preliminary after a first tally was presented. The official results were announced about a week after the election, showing very minor changes.

Party	Votes	%	Seats			
Party	Votes	%	Con.	Lev.	Tot.	+/–
Swedish Social Democratic Party	1,964,474	30.33	104	3	107	+7
Sweden Democrats	1,330,325	20.54	69	4	73	+11
Moderate Party	1,237,428	19.10	67	1	68	−2
Left Party	437,050	6.75	16	8	24	−4
Centre Party	434,945	6.71	23	1	24	−7
Christian Democrats	345,712	5.34	13	6	19	−3
Green Party	329,242	5.08	10	8	18	+2
Liberals	298,542	4.61	8	8	16	−4
Nuance Party	28,352	0.44	0	0	0	New
Alternative for Sweden	16,646	0.26	0	0	0	0
Citizens' Coalition	12,882	0.20	0	0	0	0
Pirate Party	9,135	0.14	0	0	0	0
Human Rights and Democracy	6,077	0.09	0	0	0	New
Christian Values Party	5,983	0.09	0	0	0	0
Knapptryckarna	5,493	0.08	0	0	0	New
Feminist Initiative	3,157	0.05	0	0	0	0
Independent Rural Party	2,215	0.03	0	0	0	0
Direct Democrats	1,755	0.03	0	0	0	0
Climate Alliance	1,702	0.03	0	0	0	New
Unity	1,356	0.02	0	0	0	0
Communist Party of Sweden	1,181	0.02	0	0	0	0
Socialist Welfare Party	892	0.01	0	0	0	–
Nordic Resistance Movement	847	0.01	0	0	0	0
Turning Point Party	419	0.01	0	0	0	New
Basic Income Party	374	0.01	0	0	0	New
Classical Liberal Party	344	0.01	0	0	0	0
Scania Party	206	0.00	0	0	0	0
Sweden Out of the EU/Free Justice Party	174	0.00	0	0	0	0
United Democratic Party	157	0.00	0	0	0	New
Stram Kurs Sweden	156	0.00	0	0	0	New
Donald Duck Party	144	0.00	0	0	0	0
Volt Sweden	89	0.00	0	0	0	New
Freedom Party	76	0.00	0	0	0	New
Security Party	66	0.00	0	0	0	0
Ny Reform	47	0.00	0	0	0	0
Evil Chicken Party	39	0.00	0	0	0	New
Political Shift	22	0.00	0	0	0	New
My Sweden	21	0.00	0	0	0	New
Swedish National Law	17	0.00	0	0	0	New
Freedom of the Family	16	0.00	0	0	0	New
Electoral Cooperation Party	16	0.00	0	0	0	New
European Workers Party	15	0.00	0	0	0	0
Common Sense in Sweden	10	0.00	0	0	0	0
Swexit Party	10	0.00	0	0	0	New
Freedom Movement	8	0.00	0	0	0	New
Now That Will Be Enough	8	0.00	0	0	0	New
Love Party	8	0.00	0	0	0	New
Change Party Revolution	7	0.00	0	0	0	New
Reform Party	7	0.00	0	0	0	New
The Anarchists	6	0.00	0	0	0	New
The Least Bad Party	6	0.00	0	0	0	New
Free Wermland	6	0.00	0	0	0	New
Pax	5	0.00	0	0	0	New
Nix to the Six	5	0.00	0	0	0	New
Sweden Party	4	0.00	0	0	0	New
Free Choice	4	0.00	0	0	0	New
New Democracy	4	0.00	0	0	0	New
Green Democrats	4	0.00	0	0	0	New
The Duck Party	4	0.00	0	0	0	New
Naturist Party	4	0.00	0	0	0	New
My Voice	3	0.00	0	0	0	New
Referendum Party	3	0.00	0	0	0	New
John Mikkonen	3	0.00	0	0	0	New
Neotechnocrats	3	0.00	0	0	0	New
Poor Man's Party	3	0.00	0	0	0	New
Yggdrasil	2	0.00	0	0	0	New
Corn Party	2	0.00	0	0	0	New
Peace Party	2	0.00	0	0	0	New
Social Libertarians	2	0.00	0	0	0	New
Enterprise Sweden	2	0.00	0	0	0	New
Immigrant Party	2	0.00	0	0	0	New
Bjorn Party	2	0.00	0	0	0	New
European Radical Reflection – A European Dream Party	1	0.00	0	0	0	New
Faith in the Future	1	0.00	0	0	0	New
Humanist Democracy	1	0.00	0	0	0	New
KSP	1	0.00	0	0	0	New
The Monists	1	0.00	0	0	0	New
National Socialist Reformist Party	1	0.00	0	0	0	New
New Social Party	1	0.00	0	0	0	New
OK	1	0.00	0	0	0	New
Positive Community Initiative	1	0.00	0	0	0	New
Stora Norrland's Independent Freedom Party	1	0.00	0	0	0	New
The Swedes	1	0.00	0	0	0	New
United Politics	1	0.00	0	0	0	New
Yellow Vests	1	0.00	0	0	0	New
The Natural Philosophers	1	0.00	0	0	0	New
UN Party Art. 27	1	0.00	0	0	0	New
A Wise Abolishes the Right of Asylum!	1	0.00	0	0	0	New
Other parties not reported separately	26	0.00	0	0	0	New
Total	6,477,970	100.00	310	39	349	0
Valid votes	6,477,970	98.93				
Invalid votes	6,998	0.11				
Blank votes	62,833	0.96				
Total votes	6,547,801	100.00				
Registered voters/turnout	7,775,390	84.21				
Source: Election Authority

Alliance	Votes	%	Seats	+/−
Kristersson's Bloc (M+SD+KD+L)	3,212,007	49.59	176	+2
Andersson's Bloc (S+MP+V+C)	3,165,711	48.87	173	−2
Invalid/blank votes	69,831	–	–	–
Total	6,547,625	100	349	0
Registered voters/turnout	7,775,390	84.21	–	–
Source: VAL

=== Voter demographics ===
Sveriges Television exit polling (VALU) suggested the following demographic breakdown based on preliminary results to the nearest integer.

Cohort	Percentage of cohort voting for									Lead
Cohort	S	SD	M	V	C	KD	MP	L	Others	Lead
Total vote	30	21	19	7	7	5	5	5	1	9
Gender
Females	34	16	17	8	8	6	6	4	1	17
Males	26	25	21	6	6	5	4	5	2	1
Age
18–21 years old	20	22	26	10	6	5	5	5	1	4
22–30 years old	23	17	21	11	8	6	6	5	3	2
31–64 years old	30	21	19	6	6	6	5	4	3	9
65 years old and older	38	17	16	4	7	5	4	6	3	21
Work
Blue-collar workers	32	29	14	9	4	5	4	2	1	3
White-collar workers	32	15	21	6	8	5	6	6	0	11
Entrepreneurs and farmers	19	24	25	3	9	6	6	6	2	1
Source: Sveriges Television

== Results by greater region ==
=== Percentage share ===
Land	Turnout	Share	Votes	S	SD	M	V	C	KD	MP	L	Other	Left	Right	Margin
Land	%	%		%	%	%	%	%	%	%	%	%	%	%	
Götaland	85.1	48.1	3,115,670	28.9	22.7	19.4	6.2	6.3	5.9	4.6	4.5	1.6	46.0	52.5	202,927
Svealand	83.8	40.1	2,596,794	29.6	18.1	20.1	7.4	7.2	4.8	5.9	5.3	1.6	50.1	48.2	49,429
Norrland	84.7	11.8	765,330	38.7	19.9	14.6	6.7	7.0	5.1	4.1	2.8	1.2	56.4	42.4	107,202
Total	84.2	100.0	6,477,794	30.3	20.5	19.1	6.8	6.7	5.3	5.1	4.6	1.5	48.8	49.6	46,296
Source: Sweden's Election Authority

=== By votes ===
Land	Turnout	Share	Votes	S	SD	M	V	C	KD	MP	L	Other	Left	Right	Margin
Land	%	%													
Götaland	85.1	48.1	3,115,670	900,200	708,325	604,926	192,668	195,274	182,895	143,727	138,650	49,005	1,431,869	1,634,796	202,927
Svealand	83.8	40.1	2,596,794	768,078	469,634	521,053	193,353	186,313	123,715	154,287	138,200	42,161	1,302,031	1,252,602	49,429
Norrland	84.7	11.8	765,330	296,196	152,366	111,449	51,029	53,358	39,102	31,228	21,692	8,910	431,811	324,609	107,202
Total	84.2	100.0	6,477,794	1,964,474	1,330,325	1,237,428	437,050	434,945	345,712	329,242	298,542	100,076	3,165,711	3,212,007	46,296
Source: Sweden's Election Authority

== Results by statistical area ==
=== Percentage share ===
Land	Turnout	Share	Votes	S	SD	M	V	C	KD	MP	L	Other	Left	Right	Margin
Land	%	%		%	%	%	%	%	%	%	%	%	%	%	
East Middle Sweden	84.7	17.0	1,099,304	31.3	21.4	18.7	6.2	6.4	5.5	4.7	4.4	1.4	48.6	50.0	15,203
Middle Norrland	85.1	3.8	243,745	38.2	20.5	14.3	5.7	8.0	5.4	4.0	2.7	1.2	56.0	42.8	31,966
North Middle Sweden	84.7	8.5	551,416	33.6	24.2	16.6	5.4	6.4	5.6	3.6	3.3	1.3	49.1	49.7	3,513
Småland & Islands	85.7	8.6	556,843	30.7	23.1	18.5	4.6	7.2	7.7	3.6	3.4	1.4	46.0	52.6	36,999
South Sweden	83.2	14.7	949,501	27.2	25.5	19.8	6.1	5.5	4.8	4.7	4.7	1.7	43.5	54.7	106,014
Stockholm County	83.1	22.1	1,429,261	27.5	14.6	21.9	8.6	7.9	4.2	7.2	6.3	0.3	51.2	47.0	59,183
Upper Norrland	85.2	5.2	338,998	41.2	17.2	13.9	7.8	6.6	4.9	4.5	2.8	1.1	60.0	38.9	71,745
West Sweden	84.6	20.2	1,308,726	29.0	20.9	19.5	7.0	6.4	5.9	5.0	4.8	1.6	47.4	51.0	47,461
Total	84.2	100.0	6,477,794	30.3	20.5	19.1	6.8	6.7	5.3	5.1	4.6	1.5	48.8	49.6	46,296
Source: Sweden's Election Authority

=== By votes ===
Land	Turnout	Share	Votes	S	SD	M	V	C	KD	MP	L	Other	Left	Right	Margin
Land	%	%													
East Middle Sweden	84.7	17.0	1,099,304	344,437	234,836	205,772	68,380	69,891	60,403	51,407	48,307	15,871	534,115	549,318	15,203
Middle Norrland	85.1	3.8	243,745	93,228	49,926	34,750	13,872	19,593	13,165	9,706	6,592	2,913	136,399	104,433	31,966
North Middle Sweden	84.7	8.5	551,416	185,529	133,480	91,393	29,846	35,093	31,124	20,030	18,014	6,907	270,498	274,011	3,513
Småland & Islands	85.7	8.6	556,843	170,820	128,874	102,944	25,476	40,018	42,648	19,825	18,672	7,566	256,139	293,138	36,999
South Sweden	83.2	14.7	949,501	258,347	242,011	187,606	58,262	52,295	45,364	44,572	44,509	16,535	413,476	519,490	106,014
Stockholm County	83.1	22.1	1,429,261	393,364	209,045	313,172	122,794	112,213	59,434	103,075	90,612	25,552	731,446	672,263	59,183
Upper Norrland	85.2	5.2	338,998	139,553	58,446	47,038	26,374	22,360	16,634	15,214	9,638	3,741	203,501	131,756	71,745
West Sweden	84.6	20.2	1,308,726	379,196	273,707	254,753	92,046	83,482	76,940	65,413	62,198	20,991	620,137	667,598	47,461
Total	84.2	100.0	6,477,794	1,964,474	1,330,325	1,237,428	437,050	434,945	345,712	329,242	298,542	100,076	3,165,711	3,212,007	46,296
Source: Sweden's Election Authority

== Results by constituency ==
=== Percentage share ===
Constituency	Land	Turnout	Share	Votes	S	SD	M	V	C	KD	MP	L	Other	Left	Right	Margin
Constituency		%	%		%	%	%	%	%	%	%	%	%	%	%	
Blekinge	G	86.1	1.6	103,580	31.1	28.5	17.9	4.4	4.8	5.5	2.9	3.5	1.2	43.3	55.4	12,544
Dalarna	S	85.4	2.9	186,598	31.7	25.7	16.4	5.3	6.5	6.0	3.8	3.1	1.5	47.3	51.2	7,377
Gothenburg	G	80.7	5.4	347,101	27.7	14.7	18.5	12.8	5.9	4.4	7.9	5.9	2.3	54.3	43.4	37,877
Gotland	G	87.1	0.6	41,459	34.6	15.7	16.8	6.4	11.7	4.0	6.5	2.8	1.5	59.2	39.3	8,257
Gävleborg	N	83.5	2.8	182,587	34.7	24.1	16.2	5.9	6.2	5.1	3.5	3.0	1.2	50.3	48.4	3,491
Halland	G	86.6	3.4	221,675	28.3	22.6	22.5	4.0	7.0	6.0	3.6	4.8	1.1	42.9	55.9	28,741
Jämtland	N	85.0	1.3	85,024	36.1	20.1	14.8	5.6	9.1	5.4	5.0	2.6	1.3	55.8	42.9	10,966
Jönköping	G	85.3	3.5	229,125	29.1	23.3	18.7	4.0	7.5	9.3	3.2	3.7	1.3	43.7	55.0	25,965
Kalmar	G	86.0	2.5	161,267	31.7	24.5	17.8	4.6	6.5	7.0	3.4	3.2	1.3	46.3	52.4	9,927
Kronoberg	G	85.4	1.9	124,992	31.0	23.6	19.5	5.0	6.0	6.8	3.5	3.1	1.5	45.5	53.0	9,364
Malmö	G	77.2	3.0	192,043	29.6	16.4	17.9	12.5	5.5	3.0	7.5	4.5	3.2	55.0	41.8	25,502
Norrbotten	N	84.6	2.5	161,455	41.6	20.3	13.6	7.0	5.3	5.1	3.4	2.5	1.1	57.4	41.5	25,549
Skåne NE	G	83.9	3.1	202,890	25.2	32.2	19.5	3.9	4.9	6.2	3.0	3.8	1.3	37.1	61.6	49,858
Skåne S	G	87.3	4.0	259,333	25.4	23.4	22.1	5.0	6.6	4.8	5.5	6.2	1.2	42.5	56.3	35,918
Skåne W	G	81.9	3.0	191,655	27.3	28.8	19.8	4.6	5.0	4.7	3.5	4.5	1.8	40.5	57.8	33,196
Stockholm	S	84.0	9.4	606,751	28.1	10.7	19.1	11.7	8.5	3.2	10.0	6.9	1.9	58.3	39.9	112,381
Stockholm County	S	82.5	12.7	822,510	27.1	17.5	24.0	6.3	7.4	4.9	5.1	6.0	1.7	45.9	52.4	53,198
Södermanland	S	83.5	2.9	184,880	32.9	23.0	19.2	5.2	5.9	4.7	4.0	3.6	1.4	48.1	50.5	4,581
Uppsala	S	86.0	3.8	248,888	29.1	18.2	18.3	7.9	7.2	5.9	6.7	5.0	1.7	51.0	47.4	8,907
Värmland	S	85.2	2.8	182,231	34.6	22.8	17.0	5.0	6.3	5.8	3.6	3.7	1.0	49.6	49.4	373
Västerbotten	N	85.8	2.7	177,543	40.7	14.5	14.1	8.5	7.8	4.7	5.4	3.1	1.1	62.5	36.4	46,196
Västernorrland	N	85.2	2.5	158,721	39.4	20.7	14.0	5.7	7.4	5.4	3.4	2.7	1.2	56.0	42.8	21,000
Västmanland	S	82.9	2.6	170,749	32.0	23.7	19.1	6.1	5.4	5.0	3.2	4.2	1.3	46.7	52.0	8,931
Västra Götaland E	G	86.1	2.7	176,526	31.4	24.1	18.6	4.5	6.6	7.0	3.3	3.4	1.3	45.7	53.0	12,878
Västra Götaland N	G	84.4	2.7	173,655	31.3	25.4	17.5	5.2	5.7	6.2	3.6	3.6	1.5	45.8	52.8	12,110
Västra Götaland S	G	84.4	2.2	141,906	29.1	23.6	18.9	5.3	7.1	7.0	3.6	3.8	1.6	45.1	53.3	11,590
Västra Götaland W	G	87.6	3.8	247,863	28.0	21.2	20.5	5.7	6.4	6.3	5.2	5.4	1.3	45.3	53.4	20,019
Örebro	S	84.7	3.0	194,187	33.2	22.1	16.7	6.1	6.3	5.3	4.1	4.5	1.6	49.7	48.7	1,855
Östergötland	G	85.3	4.6	300,600	30.6	21.2	19.8	5.6	6.5	6.0	4.6	4.4	1.3	47.3	51.4	12,453
Total		84.2	100.0	6,477,794	30.3	20.5	19.1	6.8	6.7	5.3	5.1	4.6	1.5	48.8	49.6	46,296
Source: Sweden's Election Authority

=== By votes ===
Constituency	Land	Turnout	Share	Votes	S	SD	M	V	C	KD	MP	L	Other	Left	Right	Margin
Constituency		%	%													
Blekinge	G	86.1	1.6	103,580	32,255	29,556	18,500	4,600	5,014	5,735	3,015	3,637	1,268	44,884	7,428	12,544
Dalarna	S	85.4	2.9	186,598	59,080	47,931	30,664	9,937	12,131	11,231	7,087	5,786	2,751	88,235	95,612	7,377
Gothenburg	G	80.7	5.4	347,101	95,980	50,889	64,157	44,602	20,343	15,170	27,485	20,317	8,158	188,410	150,533	37,877
Gotland	G	87.1	0.6	41,459	14,361	6,504	6,969	2,642	4,858	1,645	2,683	1,169	628	24,544	16,287	8,257
Gävleborg	N	83.5	2.8	182,587	63,415	43,994	29,661	10,783	11,405	9,303	6,308	5,462	2,256	91,911	88,420	3,491
Halland	G	86.6	3.4	221,675	62,666	50,046	49,810	8,963	15,590	13,328	7,963	10,739	2,570	95,182	123,923	28,741
Jämtland	N	85.0	1.3	85,024	30,666	17,097	12,574	4,749	7,771	4,574	4,269	2,244	1,080	47,455	36,489	10,966
Jönköping	G	85.3	3.5	229,125	66,568	53,338	42,913	9,069	17,078	21,326	7,377	8,480	2,976	100,092	126,057	25,965
Kalmar	G	86.0	2.5	161,267	51,179	39,516	28,672	7,484	10,523	11,226	5,427	5,126	2,114	74,613	84,540	9,927
Kronoberg	G	85.4	1.9	124,992	38,712	29,516	24,390	6,281	7,559	8,451	4,338	3,897	1,848	56,890	66,254	9,364
Malmö	G	77.2	3.0	192,043	56,789	31,433	34,313	23,986	10,546	5,753	14,386	8,706	6,131	105,707	80,205	25,502
Norrbotten	N	84.6	2.5	161,455	67,235	32,780	21,917	11,277	8,533	8,266	5,561	4,094	1,792	92,606	67,057	25,549
Skåne NE	G	83.9	3.1	202,890	51,154	65,345	39,595	7,987	10,040	12,480	6,006	7,625	2,658	75,187	125,045	49,858
Skåne S	G	87.3	4.0	259,333	65,747	60,573	57,216	12,857	17,171	12,341	14,386	15,949	3,093	110,161	146,079	35,918
Skåne W	G	81.9	3.0	191,655	52,402	55,104	37,982	8,832	9,524	9,055	6,779	8,592	3,385	77,537	110,733	33,196
Stockholm	S	84.0	9.4	606,751	170,308	64,730	115,706	71,171	51,437	19,227	60,791	41,663	11,718	353,707	241,326	112,381
Stockholm County	S	82.5	12.7	822,510	223,056	144,315	197,466	51,623	60,776	40,207	42,284	48,949	13,834	377,739	430,937	53,198
Södermanland	S	83.5	2.9	184,880	60,891	42,547	35,513	9,605	10,989	8,772	7,409	6,643	2,511	88,894	93,475	4,581
Uppsala	S	86.0	3.8	248,888	72,499	45,237	45,457	19,543	18,040	14,766	16,750	12,465	4,131	126,832	117,925	8,907
Värmland	S	85.2	2.8	182,231	63,034	41,555	31,068	9,126	11,557	10,590	6,635	6,766	1,900	90,352	89,979	373
Västerbotten	N	85.8	2.7	177,543	72,318	25,666	25,121	15,097	13,827	8,368	9,653	5,544	1,949	110,895	64,699	46,196
Västernorrland	N	85.2	2.5	158,721	62,562	32,829	22,176	9,123	11,822	8,591	5,437	4,348	1,833	88,944	67,944	21,000
Västmanland	S	82.9	2.6	170,749	54,645	40,415	32,671	10,475	9,224	8,554	5,465	7,100	2,200	79,809	88,740	8,931
Västra Götaland E	G	86.1	2.7	176,526	55,421	42,572	32,790	7,856	11,667	12,289	5,748	5,919	2,264	80,692	93,570	12,878
Västra Götaland N	G	84.4	2.7	173,655	54,311	44,165	30,443	8,953	9,938	10,711	6,318	6,311	2,505	79,520	91,630	12,110
Västra Götaland S	G	84.4	2.2	141,906	41,350	33,477	26,846	7,583	10,063	9,871	5,053	5,445	2,218	64,049	75,639	11,590
Västra Götaland W	G	87.6	3.8	247,863	69,468	52,558	50,707	14,089	15,881	15,571	12,846	13,467	3,276	112,284	132,303	20,019
Örebro	S	84.7	3.0	194,187	64,565	42,904	32,508	11,873	12,159	10,368	7,866	8,828	3,116	96,463	94,608	1,855
Östergötland	G	85.3	4.6	300,600	91,837	63,733	59,623	16,884	19,479	17,943	13,917	13,271	3,913	142,117	154,570	12,453
Total		84.2	100.0	6,477,794	1,964,474	1,330,325	1,237,428	437,050	434,945	345,712	329,242	298,542	100,076	3,165,711	3,212,007	46,296
Source: Sweden's Election Authority

== 2018–2022 bloc comparison ==
=== Percentage share ===
Constituency	Land	Votes 2018	Left 2018	Right 2018	Win 2018	Votes 2022	Left 2022	Right 2022	Win 2022	Change
Constituency			%	%	%		%	%	%	%
Blekinge	G	104,514	46.54	52.18	5.64	103,580	43.33	55.44	12.11	6.47
Dalarna	S	188,027	51.32	47.18	4.14	186,598	47.29	50.85	3.56	7.70
Gothenburg	G	349,645	51.83	46.07	5.76	347,101	54.28	43.05	11.23	5.47
Gotland	G	41,129	60.95	37.17	23.78	41,459	59.20	39.28	19.92	3.86
Gävleborg	N	185,413	54.58	44.16	10.42	182,587	50.34	47.69	2.65	7.77
Halland	G	216,982	44.32	54.33	10.01	221,675	42.94	55.90	12.96	2.95
Jämtland	N	85,223	60.95	37.59	23.36	85,024	55.81	42.92	12.89	10.47
Jönköping	G	229,580	45.98	52.83	6.85	229,125	43.68	55.02	11.34	4.49
Kalmar	G	160,864	50.01	48.75	1.26	161,267	46.27	52.55	6.28	7.54
Kronoberg	G	124,570	48.23	50.54	2.31	124,992	45.51	53.19	7.68	5.37
Malmö	G	193,298	52.28	45.71	6.57	192,043	55.04	41.49	13.55	6.98
Norrbotten	N	166,678	62.19	36.40	25.79	161,455	57.36	41.53	15.83	9.96
Skåne NE	G	202,502	38.79	59.94	21.15	202,890	37.06	61.75	24.69	3.54
Skåne S	G	252,804	39.97	58.47	18.50	259,333	42.48	56.33	13.85	4.65
Skåne W	G	191,506	40.83	57.72	16.89	191,655	40.46	57.78	17.32	0.43
Stockholm	S	611,206	53.65	44.44	9.21	606,751	58.30	39.77	18.53	9.32
Stockholm County	S	815,031	43.34	55.17	11.83	822,510	45.93	52.39	6.46	5.37
Södermanland	S	183,449	49.13	49.55	0.42	184,880	48.08	50.95	2.87	2.45
Uppsala	S	241,489	50.49	47.54	2.95	248,888	50.95	47.38	3.57	0.62
Värmland	S	183,966	53.46	45.21	8.25	182,231	49.58	48.91	0.67	7.58
Västerbotten	N	178,837	64.81	33.62	31.19	177,543	62.46	36.44	26.02	5.17
Västernorrland	N	163,001	60.55	38.06	22.49	158,721	56.04	42.81	13.23	9.26
Västmanland	S	172,719	48.12	50.53	2.41	170,749	46.74	51.97	5.23	2.82
Västra Götaland E	G	177,001	48.56	50.04	1.48	176,526	45.71	53.00	7.29	5.81
Västra Götaland N	G	174,573	48.41	50.21	1.80	173,655	45.79	52.77	6.98	5.18
Västra Götaland S	G	143,505	47.45	51.21	3.76	141,906	45.13	53.30	8.17	4.41
Västra Götaland W	G	243,278	44.26	54.38	10.12	247,863	45.30	53.38	8.08	2.04
Örebro	S	195,157	52.20	46.31	5.89	194,187	49.67	48.72	0.95	4.94
Östergötland	G	300,778	48.39	50.04	1.65	300,600	47.28	51.42	4.14	2.49
Total		6,476,725	49.29	49.18	0.11	6,477,794	48.87	49.58	0.71	0.82
Source: Sweden's Election Authority

=== By votes ===
Constituency	Land	Votes 2018	Left 2018	Right 2018	Win 2018	Votes 2022	Left 2022	Right 2022	Win 2022	Change
Constituency	#									
Blekinge	G	104,514	48,642	54,531	5,889	103,580	44,884	57,428	12,544	6,655
Dalarna	S	188,027	96,492	88,719	7,773	186,598	88,235	95,612	7,377	15,150
Gothenburg	G	349,645	181,222	161,092	20,130	347,101	188,410	150,533	37,877	17,747
Gotland	G	41,129	25,070	15,286	9,784	41,459	24,544	16,287	8,257	1,527
Gävleborg	N	185,413	101,201	81,887	19,314	182,587	91,911	88,420	3,491	15,823
Halland	G	216,982	96,169	117,881	21,712	221,675	95,182	123,923	28,741	7,029
Jämtland	N	85,223	51,946	32,032	19,914	85,024	47,455	36,489	10,966	8,948
Jönköping	G	229,580	105,550	121,291	15,741	229,125	100,092	126,057	25,965	10,224
Kalmar	G	160,864	80,448	78,429	2,019	161,267	74,613	84,540	9,927	11,946
Kronoberg	G	124,570	60,080	62,952	2,872	124,992	56,890	66,254	9,364	6,492
Malmö	G	193,298	101,055	88,363	12,692	192,043	105,707	80,205	25,502	12,810
Norrbotten	N	166,678	103,658	60,672	42,986	161,455	92,606	67,057	25,549	17,437
Skåne NE	G	202,502	78,556	121,375	42,819	202,890	75,187	125,045	49,858	7,039
Skåne S	G	252,804	101,040	147,817	46,777	259,333	110,161	146,079	35,918	10,859
Skåne W	G	191,506	78,201	110,540	32,339	191,655	77,537	110,733	33,196	857
Stockholm	S	611,206	327,934	271,630	56,304	606,751	353,707	241,326	112,381	56,077
Stockholm County	S	815,031	353,218	449,644	96,426	822,510	377,739	430,937	53,198	43,228
Södermanland	S	183,449	90,124	90,898	774	184,880	88,894	93,475	4,581	3,807
Uppsala	S	241,489	121,920	114,819	7,101	248,888	126,832	117,925	8,907	1,806
Värmland	S	183,966	98,352	83,162	15,190	182,231	90,352	89,979	373	14,817
Västerbotten	N	178,837	115,896	60,124	55,772	177,543	110,895	64,699	46,196	9,576
Västernorrland	N	163,001	98,691	62,032	36,659	158,721	88,944	67,944	21,000	15,659
Västmanland	S	172,719	83,115	87,279	4,164	170,749	79,809	88,740	8,931	4,767
Västra Götaland E	G	177,001	85,952	88,569	2,617	176,526	80,692	93,570	12,878	10,261
Västra Götaland N	G	174,573	84,515	87,656	3,141	173,655	79,520	91,630	12,110	8,969
Västra Götaland S	G	143,505	68,098	73,487	5,389	141,906	64,049	75,639	11,590	6,201
Västra Götaland W	G	243,278	107,671	132,287	24,616	247,863	112,284	132,303	20,019	4,597
Örebro	S	195,157	101,864	90,377	11,487	194,187	96,463	94,608	1,855	9,632
Östergötland	G	300,778	145,559	150,518	4,959	300,600	142,117	154,570	12,453	7,494
Total		6,476,725	3,192,239	3,185,349	6,890	6,477,794	3,165,711	3,212,007	46,296	53,186
Source: Sweden's Election Authority

== Seat distribution ==
Constituency	S	SD	M	V	C	KD	MP	L	Left	Right	Total
Blekinge	2	2	1	0	0	0	0	0	2	3	5
Dalarna	3	3	2	1	1	1	0	0	5	6	11
Gävleborg	4	2	2	1	1	1	0	0	6	5	11
Gothenburg	5	3	3	2	1	1	2	1	10	8	18
Gotland	1	0	1	0	0	0	0	0	1	1	2
Halland	3	3	2	0	1	1	1	1	5	7	12
Jämtland	2	1	1	0	0	0	0	0	2	2	4
Jönköping	4	3	2	1	1	1	0	1	6	7	13
Kalmar	3	2	2	0	0	1	0	0	3	5	8
Kronoberg	2	2	2	0	0	0	0	0	2	4	6
Malmö	3	2	2	1	1	0	1	1	6	5	11
Norrbotten	4	2	1	1	0	0	0	0	5	3	8
Skåne NE	3	4	2	0	0	1	0	0	3	7	10
Skåne S	3	3	3	1	1	1	1	1	6	8	14
Skåne W	3	3	2	0	1	0	0	1	4	6	10
Södermanland	4	2	2	1	1	0	1	0	7	4	11
Stockholm	9	4	6	4	3	1	4	3	20	14	34
Stockholm County	11	8	10	3	3	2	3	3	20	23	43
Uppsala	4	2	2	1	1	1	1	1	7	6	13
Värmland	4	2	2	1	1	1	0	0	6	5	11
Västerbotten	4	1	1	1	1	0	1	0	7	2	9
Västernorrland	4	2	1	1	1	0	0	0	6	3	9
Västmanland	3	2	2	1	0	0	0	0	4	4	8
Västra Götaland E	3	2	2	0	1	1	0	0	4	5	9
Västra Götaland N	3	2	2	0	0	1	0	0	3	5	8
Västra Götaland S	2	2	2	0	1	1	0	0	3	5	8
Västra Götaland W	3	3	3	1	1	1	1	1	6	8	14
Örebro	3	2	2	1	1	1	1	1	6	6	12
Östergötland	5	4	3	1	1	1	1	1	8	9	17
Total	107	73	68	24	24	19	18	16	173	176	349
Source: Sweden's Election Authority

== Results by municipality ==
Sweden is divided into 21 counties, most of whom are similar to the constituencies underneath and form the 290 municipalities and 6,578 electoral districts. The counties of Sweden are Blekinge, Dalarna, Gotland, Gävleborg, Halland, Jämtland, Jönköping, Kalmar, Kronoberg, Norrbotten, Skåne, Stockholm, Södermanland, Uppsala, Värmland, Västerbotten, Västernorrland, Västmanland, Västra Götaland, Örebro and Östergötland.

In spite of the close overall results, the left bloc won just 78 municipalities to 212 for the right bloc. Instead, the leftist parties carried the large cities by unprecedented margins.

=== Municipal summary ===
Location	District	Turnout	Votes	S	SD	M	V	C	KD	MP	L	Other	L-vote	R-vote	Left	Right	+/-
Location		%		%	%	%	%	%	%	%	%	%			%	%	
Ale	V Götaland W	85.1	19,517	29.9	25.7	18.3	6.7	5.3	5.6	3.6	3.3	1.7	8,858	10,331	45.4	52.9	1,473
Alingsås	V Götaland W	87.9	27,734	29.8	19.1	18.0	6.5	7.0	7.3	5.8	5.1	1.5	13,604	13,713	49.1	49.4	109
Alvesta	Kronoberg	84.7	12,226	29.0	28.4	18.0	4.1	6.2	7.3	2.6	2.4	2.0	5,131	6,850	42.0	56.0	1,719
Aneby	Jönköping	88.2	4,465	25.0	26.9	16.8	2.7	9.3	11.4	2.7	3.4	1.7	1,770	2,617	39.6	58.6	847
Arboga	Västmanland	84.0	9,081	33.8	25.6	17.6	4.8	5.2	4.8	3.5	3.6	1.1	4,296	4,682	47.3	51.6	386
Arjeplog	Norrbotten	82.1	1,717	37.9	24.8	9.0	7.8	4.5	8.8	3.4	3.0	0.8	921	783	53.6	45.6	138
Arvidsjaur	Norrbotten	85.0	4,002	42.0	24.0	10.8	7.1	5.6	5.1	1.3	3.2	0.9	2,243	1,724	56.0	43.1	519
Arvika	Värmland	84.6	16,593	34.9	23.3	16.9	5.4	6.0	5.5	4.2	2.9	0.9	8,381	8,067	50.5	48.6	314
Askersund	Örebro	86.5	7,817	32.0	29.6	15.6	3.4	6.5	5.6	3.0	2.8	1.5	3,502	4,197	44.8	53.7	695
Avesta	Dalarna	84.1	14,343	35.7	27.9	15.3	4.6	4.9	5.4	2.2	2.6	1.1	6,792	7,347	47.4	51.2	555
Bengtsfors	V Götaland N	83.5	5,840	32.6	29.7	14.3	4.5	5.9	6.5	3.3	2.4	0.8	2,702	3,089	46.3	52.9	387
Berg	Jämtland	83.7	4,554	32.4	24.5	17.3	4.3	9.5	5.7	3.4	1.4	1.5	2,261	2,226	49.6	48.9	35
Bjurholm	Västerbotten	82.9	1,500	29.8	24.3	20.1	2.8	8.1	9.1	1.9	3.0	0.9	639	847	42.6	56.5	208
Bjuv	Skåne W	79.9	8,661	27.1	42.1	15.1	3.7	2.9	4.1	1.4	1.8	1.9	3,039	5,459	35.1	63.0	2,420
Boden	Norrbotten	85.4	18,574	42.2	22.7	14.7	5.2	4.8	4.5	2.5	2.3	1.1	10,162	8,216	54.7	44.2	1,946
Bollebygd	V Götaland S	89.1	6,356	25.6	27.7	20.1	4.3	6.5	6.6	3.9	4.1	1.2	2,559	3,719	40.3	58.5	1,160
Bollnäs	Gävleborg	83.4	16,939	36.0	24.6	13.9	5.1	7.5	6.2	3.0	2.6	1.0	8,746	8,018	51.6	47.3	728
Borgholm	Kalmar	86.8	7,715	28.1	25.5	17.8	3.8	8.7	7.4	4.4	3.1	1.3	3,469	4,148	45.0	53.8	679
Borlänge	Dalarna	83.1	31,848	34.0	24.5	16.7	6.0	5.3	4.8	3.7	3.5	1.5	15,595	15,765	49.0	49.5	170
Borås	V Götaland S	82.4	68,283	30.4	21.5	20.1	6.1	5.9	6.3	3.8	4.2	1.7	31,527	35,599	46.2	52.1	4,072
Botkyrka	Stockholm	71.3	43,262	32.3	18.5	17.3	10.3	4.7	6.6	3.9	3.1	3.4	22,152	19,656	51.2	45.4	2,496
Boxholm	Östergötland	88.0	3,749	35.9	26.6	14.9	4.1	5.9	6.0	2.6	2.5	1.4	1,821	1,876	48.6	50.0	55
Bromölla	Skåne NE	84.7	7,989	28.3	39.1	16.1	3.3	2.4	5.2	1.8	2.7	1.1	2,862	5,038	35.8	63.1	2,176
Bräcke	Jämtland	82.7	3,930	36.8	27.6	13.1	4.6	8.1	4.8	2.5	1.2	1.2	2,046	1,837	52.1	46.7	209
Burlöv	Skåne S	74.5	9,947	32.6	24.2	17.6	7.2	4.9	3.3	3.8	3.6	2.7	4,821	4,855	48.5	48.8	34
Båstad	Skåne NE	87.1	10,883	20.7	24.7	25.8	2.6	7.6	6.9	4.2	6.2	1.1	3,837	6,925	35.3	63.6	3,088
Dals-Ed	V Götaland N	83.2	2,875	23.2	31.7	16.7	3.0	8.6	10.9	1.6	2.5	1.8	1,047	1,776	36.4	61.8	729
Danderyd	Stockholm	89.7	21,658	12.5	11.1	41.0	2.1	10.0	5.9	4.2	12.3	0.9	6,235	15,229	28.8	70.3	8,994
Degerfors	Örebro	84.9	6,261	39.6	26.6	12.0	7.7	3.9	4.2	2.4	2.3	1.3	3,359	2,819	53.6	45.0	540
Dorotea	Västerbotten	80.8	1,523	42.1	23.0	6.8	8.6	7.6	5.1	1.7	3.8	1.2	914	591	60.0	38.8	323
Eda	Värmland	80.4	4,320	33.4	29.9	14.1	3.0	6.2	9.1	1.4	2.1	0.8	1,898	2,386	43.9	55.2	488
Ekerö	Stockholm	90.4	18,186	23.0	19.3	25.6	3.8	9.1	5.7	6.1	6.3	1.1	7,647	10,341	42.0	56.9	2,694
Eksjö	Jönköping	86.6	11,457	28.5	24.4	17.8	3.6	9.1	8.0	3.0	3.8	1.9	5,063	6,178	44.2	53.9	1,115
Emmaboda	Kalmar	84.9	5,763	33.4	28.0	14.6	4.4	6.9	6.3	2.7	2.4	1.4	2,726	2,959	47.3	51.3	233
Enköping	Uppsala	84.4	29,193	27.9	24.7	21.7	4.2	6.7	6.4	3.4	3.6	1.5	12,310	16,454	42.2	56.4	4,144
Eskilstuna	Södermanland	80.4	62,313	33.0	24.2	18.5	5.9	5.1	4.7	3.5	3.6	1.5	29,617	31,789	47.5	51.0	2,172
Eslöv	Skåne W	83.8	20,683	28.3	30.7	17.7	4.7	5.1	4.7	3.6	3.6	1.6	8,629	11,723	41.7	56.7	3,094
Essunga	V Götaland E	87.4	3,788	27.0	29.9	20.2	3.5	8.2	5.9	2.5	1.9	0.9	1,557	2,196	41.1	58.0	639
Fagersta	Västmanland	80.8	7,634	35.6	27.9	14.8	7.7	3.3	4.8	2.4	2.5	1.1	3,740	3,811	49.0	49.9	71
Falkenberg	Halland	85.6	30,318	31.5	21.7	20.1	4.2	8.5	5.5	3.5	4.0	1.0	14,452	15,558	47.7	51.3	1,106
Falköping	V Götaland E	85.1	20,933	29.7	25.1	17.3	4.9	7.1	7.6	3.5	3.2	1.6	9,460	11,143	45.2	53.2	1,683
Falun	Dalarna	87.0	39,594	31.4	18.6	18.6	6.0	8.1	5.6	6.2	4.0	1.5	20,495	18,504	51.8	46.7	1,991
Filipstad	Värmland	80.4	6,132	36.7	30.4	14.5	5.1	3.1	4.9	1.6	2.4	1.2	2,852	3,207	46.5	52.3	355
Finspång	Östergötland	85.3	13,999	35.5	26.1	15.2	5.4	4.8	5.5	2.9	3.2	1.5	6,791	7,002	48.5	50.0	211
Flen	Södermanland	82.6	9,837	34.8	24.9	15.3	5.1	6.3	5.1	4.1	3.1	1.3	4,954	4,759	50.4	48.4	195
Forshaga	Värmland	86.9	7,582	37.7	26.7	14.2	4.2	5.0	5.9	2.8	2.3	1.1	3,772	3,727	49.7	49.2	45
Färgelanda	V Götaland N	82.5	4,256	26.7	38.2	13.0	3.1	6.8	6.6	1.7	2.7	1.2	1,631	2,575	38.3	60.5	944
Gagnef	Dalarna	87.9	6,968	27.0	27.8	15.3	4.9	8.2	9.0	3.9	2.9	1.0	3,070	3,830	44.1	55.0	760
Gislaved	Jönköping	81.6	17,174	29.0	27.6	19.3	3.5	7.1	7.8	1.8	3.0	0.9	7,113	9,902	41.4	57.7	2,789
Gnesta	Södermanland	86.4	7,360	29.1	22.2	19.4	6.9	7.6	4.3	6.2	2.9	1.4	3,659	3,595	49.7	48.8	64
Gnosjö	Jönköping	81.6	5,518	24.6	26.5	20.6	2.6	7.2	13.0	1.7	3.0	0.7	1,992	3,485	36.1	63.2	1,493
Gothenburg	Gothenburg	80.7	347,101	27.7	14.7	18.5	12.8	5.9	4.4	7.9	5.9	2.3	188,410	150,533	54.3	43.4	37,877
Gotland	Gotland	87.1	41,456	34.6	15.7	16.8	6.4	11.7	4.0	6.5	2.8	1.5	24,544	16,287	59.2	39.3	8,257
Grums	Värmland	84.1	5,749	37.9	29.4	14.3	4.3	5.1	4.4	1.8	1.8	1.0	2,824	2,866	49.1	49.9	42
Grästorp	V Götaland E	88.3	3,943	24.9	29.4	20.2	2.6	9.3	6.8	2.4	3.2	1.2	1,546	2,348	39.2	59.5	802
Gullspång	V Götaland E	83.4	3,299	34.5	29.4	14.2	4.6	5.9	5.0	2.2	2.2	1.8	1,561	1,678	47.3	50.9	117
Gällivare	Norrbotten	81.0	10,959	38.5	27.2	13.0	8.2	2.8	4.3	3.6	1.4	1.1	5,810	5,024	53.0	45.8	786
Gävle	Gävleborg	84.0	65,558	33.3	22.6	19.2	6.5	5.0	4.3	4.0	3.8	1.4	32,026	32,624	48.9	49.8	598
Götene	V Götaland E	88.1	8,951	32.2	23.4	16.1	4.4	7.5	8.1	3.9	3.2	1.2	4,300	4,544	48.0	50.8	244
Habo	Jönköping	91.5	8,256	26.3	23.8	20.5	2.8	7.0	11.1	3.3	3.8	1.4	3,251	4,891	39.4	59.2	1,640
Hagfors	Värmland	82.5	7,210	43.2	27.6	9.4	5.5	4.3	5.0	1.8	2.1	1.2	3,943	3,183	54.7	44.1	760
Hallsberg	Örebro	85.6	10,073	35.5	27.2	14.7	4.8	6.1	4.6	2.9	2.9	1.3	4,964	4,981	49.3	49.4	17
Hallstahammar	Västmanland	83.2	10,125	34.9	28.2	14.8	5.9	4.3	4.9	2.6	2.9	1.6	4,833	5,135	47.7	50.7	302
Halmstad	Halland	83.8	65,548	31.6	21.7	20.8	4.9	6.1	5.5	3.6	4.4	1.5	30,261	34,327	46.2	52.4	4,066
Hammarö	Värmland	90.4	11,052	37.2	16.1	20.2	3.4	6.9	5.2	4.4	5.4	0.9	5,727	5,222	51.8	47.2	505
Haninge	Stockholm	79.0	50,489	29.8	22.8	20.8	7.3	5.4	4.2	3.7	3.9	2.2	23,313	26,080	46.2	51.7	2,767
Haparanda	Norrbotten	69.1	4,220	35.9	30.9	13.5	3.8	6.2	5.1	1.9	1.7	1.0	2,015	2,164	47.7	51.3	149
Heby	Uppsala	85.1	9,149	27.6	29.6	14.8	4.9	7.9	8.2	2.9	2.4	1.6	3,966	5,036	43.3	55.0	1,070
Hedemora	Dalarna	83.3	9,743	29.6	28.8	16.1	5.6	6.2	6.2	3.5	2.1	1.7	4,385	5,190	45.0	53.3	805
Herrljunga	V Götaland S	87.4	6,302	26.0	26.4	16.3	4.7	9.1	9.4	2.7	3.7	1.7	2,678	3,518	42.5	55.8	840
Helsingborg	Skåne W	80.1	87,626	28.1	26.3	21.6	5.0	5.0	4.5	3.4	4.4	1.7	36,358	49,768	41.5	56.8	13,410
Hjo	V Götaland E	87.7	6,262	29.5	22.6	18.7	4.0	6.6	9.5	4.4	3.5	1.2	2,792	3,392	44.6	54.2	600
Hofors	Gävleborg	82.3	6,006	36.4	27.8	13.6	8.3	3.9	4.4	2.3	2.1	1.1	3,052	2,889	50.8	48.1	163
Huddinge	Stockholm	80.8	60,933	30.0	17.0	21.4	8.4	6.9	3.8	5.6	4.7	2.1	31,027	28,604	50.9	46.9	2,423
Hudiksvall	Gävleborg	83.9	24,441	36.4	21.2	14.6	6.3	8.4	5.3	4.3	2.5	1.2	13,515	10,627	55.3	43.5	2,888
Hultsfred	Kalmar	82.9	8,445	33.6	26.3	12.4	4.6	7.3	10.2	1.8	1.9	1.7	4,002	4,299	47.4	50.9	297
Hylte	Halland	82.1	6,036	30.3	30.5	14.7	3.6	7.7	7.2	2.5	2.7	0.9	2,663	3,318	44.1	55.0	655
Håbo	Uppsala	86.5	13,992	24.5	28.4	23.8	3.8	5.2	6.0	2.8	4.4	1.1	5,088	8,744	36.4	62.5	3,656
Hällefors	Örebro	81.6	4,016	38.3	29.5	13.0	5.9	4.2	3.1	2.6	2.1	1.2	2,050	1,919	51.0	47.8	131
Härjedalen	Jämtland	83.4	6,688	33.4	25.5	13.4	5.5	8.0	6.8	3.0	3.0	1.3	3,341	3,259	50.0	48.7	82
Härnösand	Västernorrland	84.4	15,950	39.6	19.7	12.3	6.4	7.6	4.7	6.0	2.6	1.2	9,502	6,252	59.6	39.2	3,250
Härryda	V Götaland W	88.9	24,947	27.2	20.6	22.5	4.7	7.1	5.0	5.6	6.2	1.1	11,120	13,560	44.6	54.4	2,440
Hässleholm	Skåne NE	83.6	32,621	24.6	33.6	17.7	4.7	5.0	6.8	2.8	3.5	1.2	12,117	20,120	37.1	61.7	8,003
Höganäs	Skåne W	87.8	18,548	24.3	23.6	25.1	3.1	6.6	5.7	4.5	5.9	1.2	7,141	11,190	38.5	60.3	4,049
Högsby	Kalmar	83.9	3,304	30.8	30.7	11.8	3.9	7.7	10.7	1.8	1.2	1.4	1,462	1,797	44.2	54.4	335
Hörby	Skåne W	85.4	10,094	21.1	39.0	16.3	3.7	5.6	6.9	2.8	3.7	1.0	3,353	6,640	33.2	65.8	3,287
Höör	Skåne W	86.2	10,904	23.1	30.6	17.6	5.2	5.3	6.0	6.2	4.3	1.6	4,345	6,383	39.8	58.5	2,038
Jokkmokk	Norrbotten	81.6	3,026	34.2	22.5	9.9	9.2	4.4	4.5	11.8	2.0	1.5	1,804	1,177	59.6	38.9	627
Järfälla	Stockholm	79.4	45,409	30.7	16.4	21.0	9.1	6.1	4.3	4.8	5.1	2.4	23,038	21,271	50.7	46.8	1,767
Jönköping	Jönköping	85.2	90,470	29.9	19.4	19.4	4.8	7.6	9.1	4.2	4.4	1.3	41,998	47,321	46.4	52.3	5,323
Kalix	Norrbotten	84.3	10,355	43.9	24.2	12.6	4.4	5.0	4.5	2.6	2.0	0.9	5,790	4,476	55.9	43.2	1,314
Kalmar	Kalmar	87.0	46,794	31.8	20.1	20.6	5.5	6.4	5.9	4.7	3.9	1.2	22,635	23,613	48.4	50.5	978
Karlsborg	V Götaland E	89.1	4,882	30.4	26.7	16.7	3.5	6.9	8.3	2.5	4.1	0.9	2,113	2,724	43.3	55.8	611
Karlshamn	Blekinge	85.2	21,015	31.7	28.8	17.8	4.6	4.7	4.9	3.3	3.0	1.1	9,322	11,460	44.4	54.5	2,138
Karlskoga	Örebro	84.3	19,604	37.4	23.7	18.9	5.0	4.1	3.9	2.6	3.0	1.3	9,634	9,722	49.1	49.6	88
Karlskrona	Blekinge	87.8	44,082	31.9	24.4	19.0	4.6	5.4	5.9	3.4	4.3	1.2	19,935	23,601	45.2	53.5	3,666
Karlstad	Värmland	85.8	63,445	34.8	17.3	19.5	6.2	6.5	4.8	5.1	4.7	1.1	33,336	29,409	52.5	46.4	3,927
Katrineholm	Södermanland	83.0	21,314	37.8	21.8	16.9	4.7	6.1	4.7	3.7	3.0	1.3	11,157	9,885	52.3	46.4	1,272
Kil	Värmland	87.6	8,044	32.4	27.8	16.5	3.8	6.5	5.5	3.4	3.4	0.7	3,709	4,279	46.1	53.2	570
Kinda	Östergötland	88.1	6,778	29.7	25.3	16.5	3.9	8.0	8.2	4.5	2.5	1.5	3,123	3,553	46.1	52.4	430
Kiruna	Norrbotten	82.0	13,698	41.9	22.1	11.1	8.1	2.9	6.8	3.8	1.8	1.5	7,763	5,724	56.7	41.8	2,039
Klippan	Skåne NE	82.2	10,544	23.7	40.3	15.7	3.5	4.1	6.6	2.3	2.2	1.7	3,542	6,827	33.6	64.7	3,285
Knivsta	Uppsala	89.2	12,065	25.0	19.5	21.1	4.7	7.8	8.5	6.2	5.6	1.6	5,269	6,605	43.7	54.7	1,336
Kramfors	Västernorrland	83.7	11,550	41.6	21.9	9.5	7.9	8.3	4.6	3.1	1.6	1.4	7,043	4,346	61.0	37.6	2,697
Kristianstad	Skåne NE	83.1	53,832	25.8	28.8	21.9	4.5	4.6	5.5	2.6	4.8	1.5	20,203	32,813	37.5	61.0	12,610
Kristinehamn	Värmland	84.9	15,890	36.3	23.2	14.9	5.7	5.9	5.0	3.2	4.6	1.0	8,143	7,581	51.2	47.7	562
Krokom	Jämtland	87.3	9,805	33.0	21.3	15.5	5.3	10.7	6.1	5.1	2.0	1.1	5,299	4,397	54.0	44.8	902
Kumla	Örebro	86.9	14,141	33.2	25.6	17.3	4.3	5.6	5.6	2.6	4.7	1.2	6,451	7,520	45.6	53.2	1,069
Kungsbacka	Halland	90.3	57,603	21.2	22.6	29.0	3.0	6.6	6.4	3.8	6.4	1.0	19,927	37,078	34.6	64.4	17,151
Kungsör	Västmanland	84.9	5,456	32.0	29.0	16.2	4.5	5.2	6.0	2.5	3.7	1.1	2,408	2,989	44.1	54.8	581
Kungälv	V Götaland W	88.5	32,340	28.1	22.8	20.5	4.9	6.3	6.5	4.3	5.1	1.5	14,109	17,750	43.6	54.9	3,641
Kävlinge	Skåne S	89.8	21,029	25.1	26.8	24.5	2.5	6.9	4.6	3.4	5.2	0.8	7,984	12,869	38.0	61.2	4,885
Köping	Västmanland	82.4	15,956	32.5	29.2	14.7	6.3	4.9	6.4	2.2	2.8	1.1	7,332	8,452	46.0	53.0	1,120
Laholm	Halland	85.4	16,922	25.1	30.9	18.5	3.0	7.4	7.3	2.8	3.9	1.1	6,481	10,255	38.3	60.6	3,774
Landskrona	Skåne W	79.5	26,654	31.1	27.4	17.3	4.8	3.8	3.6	3.1	6.1	2.8	11,391	14,511	42.7	54.4	3,120
Laxå	Örebro	85.3	3,633	34.5	30.7	12.2	4.8	5.1	6.2	2.1	2.9	1.4	1,689	1,892	46.5	52.1	203
Lekeberg	Örebro	89.3	5,598	25.3	27.5	17.2	3.6	9.5	8.1	3.4	3.8	1.6	2,340	3,167	41.8	56.6	827
Leksand	Dalarna	87.8	11,018	29.8	21.4	18.6	5.1	7.9	8.1	4.2	3.6	1.2	5,197	5,690	47.2	51.6	493
Lerum	V Götaland W	89.8	27,881	26.9	19.7	21.9	5.4	6.5	6.0	6.3	6.3	1.0	12,568	15,045	45.1	54.0	2,477
Lessebo	Kronoberg	85.2	5,007	36.4	25.6	15.5	6.7	4.7	5.9	2.5	1.6	1.2	2,515	2,434	50.2	48.6	81
Lidingö	Stockholm	87.7	31,247	17.8	12.1	34.2	3.1	10.4	5.2	5.5	10.7	1.0	11,488	19,433	36.8	62.2	7,945
Lidköping	V Götaland E	87.8	27,366	34.1	21.4	17.6	5.0	6.4	6.6	3.9	3.9	1.2	13,493	13,550	49.3	49.5	57
Lilla Edet	V Götaland W	83.0	8,684	28.8	35.3	13.3	5.7	4.9	5.4	2.3	2.5	1.8	3,620	4,907	41.7	56.5	1,287
Lindesberg	Örebro	84.5	15,053	30.2	30.1	15.5	5.1	6.0	5.4	3.2	2.7	1.8	6,701	8,087	44.5	53.7	1,386
Linköping	Östergötland	86.2	106,264	30.1	15.9	20.9	6.0	8.1	5.3	6.3	6.0	1.4	53,624	51,100	50.5	48.1	2,524
Ljungby	Kronoberg	84.3	17,604	29.0	28.3	19.4	3.7	5.6	7.7	2.5	2.5	1.3	7,188	10,187	40.8	57.9	2,999
Ljusdal	Gävleborg	82.8	12,043	32.1	26.2	16.0	4.6	8.0	5.6	3.5	3.0	1.1	5,795	6,116	48.1	50.8	321
Ljusnarsberg	Örebro	81.0	2,845	32.8	34.9	13.7	5.4	3.0	4.1	1.9	1.8	2.3	1,230	1,550	43.2	54.5	320
Lomma	Skåne S	92.4	16,493	23.2	17.6	29.4	2.2	8.5	4.8	4.6	8.9	0.8	6,341	10,028	38.4	60.8	3,687
Ludvika	Dalarna	84.3	16,327	35.2	28.1	14.1	6.2	4.6	4.7	2.8	2.9	1.4	7,970	8,135	48.8	49.8	165
Luleå	Norrbotten	86.9	52,524	39.5	17.4	15.7	7.2	5.9	5.3	4.3	3.6	1.1	29,889	22,053	56.9	42.0	7,836
Lund	Skåne S	87.7	81,313	28.3	12.8	16.8	9.1	8.7	3.4	11.0	8.4	1.4	46,470	33,666	57.1	41.4	12,804
Lycksele	Västerbotten	83.0	7,555	40.4	18.2	14.7	5.3	5.2	10.3	2.2	2.9	0.8	4,017	3,477	53.2	46.0	540
Lysekil	V Götaland N	86.0	9,629	33.5	25.2	16.3	5.0	4.6	5.2	4.4	4.4	1.5	4,569	4,920	47.5	51.1	351
Malmö	Malmö	77.2	192,043	29.6	16.4	17.9	12.5	5.5	3.0	7.5	4.5	3.2	105,707	80,205	55.0	41.8	25,502
Malung-Sälen	Dalarna	86.4	6,786	26.2	32.1	18.9	4.1	5.4	6.5	1.9	3.3	1.7	2,552	4,122	37.6	60.7	1,570
Malå	Västerbotten	82.0	1,807	40.1	24.4	9.5	9.0	4.4	5.8	1.4	4.8	0.7	992	803	54.9	44.4	189
Mariestad	V Götaland E	86.3	16,463	34.2	22.9	20.3	4.6	5.5	5.8	3.2	2.4	1.1	7,806	8,472	47.4	51.5	666
Mark	V Götaland S	85.9	22,632	30.5	24.9	16.5	5.4	7.6	6.9	3.4	3.2	1.7	10,607	11,639	46.9	51.4	1,032
Markaryd	Kronoberg	82.0	5,969	27.1	35.8	15.5	3.2	4.0	9.6	1.5	1.8	1.6	2,129	3,742	35.7	62.7	1,613
Mellerud	V Götaland N	84.4	5,766	26.0	32.4	17.2	3.4	7.4	6.8	2.7	2.3	1.8	2,276	3,384	39.5	58.7	1,108
Mjölby	Östergötland	86.8	18,378	31.8	24.5	20.2	4.0	5.7	6.1	2.8	4.0	1.0	8,145	10,057	44.3	54.7	1,912
Mora	Dalarna	85.3	13,751	29.6	29.0	16.0	4.3	7.1	6.5	3.3	2.9	1.3	6,094	7,473	44.3	54.3	1,379
Motala	Östergötland	85.3	28,104	34.2	24.9	18.7	4.4	5.1	5.5	2.7	3.5	1.0	13,051	14,783	46.4	52.6	1,732
Mullsjö	Jönköping	88.7	4,903	26.0	27.0	16.4	3.9	5.7	12.5	3.8	3.2	1.4	1,933	2,899	39.4	59.1	966
Munkedal	V Götaland N	83.8	6,630	27.4	32.0	15.7	4.4	6.1	8.0	2.4	2.5	1.5	2,674	3,856	40.3	58.2	1,182
Munkfors	Värmland	84.0	2,250	44.0	24.9	10.3	5.1	5.6	4.4	2.1	2.4	1.2	1,278	946	56.8	42.0	332
Mölndal	V Götaland W	86.7	44,287	28.2	17.7	21.2	7.0	7.2	4.9	6.2	6.4	1.4	21,479	22,197	48.5	50.1	718
Mönsterås	Kalmar	87.3	8,753	31.6	30.6	14.0	3.6	6.3	8.0	2.2	2.6	1.2	3,815	4,834	43.6	55.2	1,019
Mörbylånga	Kalmar	90.4	10,961	29.6	22.7	19.5	4.1	7.6	7.5	4.7	3.5	0.8	5,050	5,827	46.1	53.2	777
Nacka	Stockholm	87.3	67,081	25.3	11.8	26.9	5.3	10.4	4.0	7.4	7.6	1.3	32,459	33,766	48.4	50.3	1,307
Nora	Örebro	86.1	7,031	32.9	25.8	15.0	4.7	6.0	5.6	4.4	3.7	1.8	3,378	3,523	48.0	50.1	145
Norberg	Västmanland	83.6	3,587	36.9	25.8	14.3	7.7	3.0	4.6	2.9	3.1	1.7	1,811	1,714	50.5	47.8	97
Nordanstig	Gävleborg	82.5	6,017	31.6	29.0	13.1	6.2	7.1	6.5	2.9	2.2	1.4	2,877	3,056	47.8	50.8	179
Nordmaling	Västerbotten	84.4	4,605	37.4	21.6	13.6	5.7	9.3	6.1	2.6	2.6	1.0	2,531	2,026	55.0	44.0	505
Norrköping	Östergötland	82.6	88,622	29.4	22.7	20.4	6.8	5.1	6.1	4.4	3.7	1.3	40,508	46,925	45.7	52.9	6,417
Norrtälje	Stockholm	85.0	42,903	29.1	25.2	20.6	4.6	6.3	4.7	4.0	4.2	1.1	18,914	23,498	44.1	54.8	4,584
Norsjö	Västerbotten	83.1	2,504	41.3	18.4	13.4	6.4	6.1	8.5	1.2	3.6	1.0	1,377	1,101	55.0	44.0	276
Nybro	Kalmar	84.8	12,678	32.7	27.2	15.7	4.7	6.3	6.9	2.2	2.8	1.5	5,818	6,666	45.9	52.6	848
Nykvarn	Stockholm	88.9	7,276	24.9	28.7	25.6	2.5	5.3	5.3	2.6	4.4	0.7	2,566	4,660	35.3	64.0	2,094
Nyköping	Södermanland	85.8	36,968	34.1	20.2	19.3	5.0	6.8	4.8	4.7	3.8	1.3	18,710	17,793	50.6	48.1	917
Nynäshamn	Stockholm	83.1	17,676	31.4	27.3	17.7	5.2	4.5	5.1	4.0	3.4	1.4	7,984	9,444	45.2	53.4	1,460
Nässjö	Jönköping	84.7	19,250	30.0	28.0	15.9	4.0	6.2	8.4	3.0	3.2	1.3	8,329	10,675	43.3	55.5	2,346
Ockelbo	Gävleborg	84.7	3,800	33.2	30.8	12.3	5.2	7.3	5.0	3.4	1.9	1.0	1,865	1,897	49.1	49.9	32
Olofström	Blekinge	80.9	8,117	33.0	34.7	13.3	4.6	4.5	4.9	2.0	2.0	0.9	3,580	4,466	44.1	55.0	886
Orsa	Dalarna	84.7	4,598	26.8	32.9	13.4	5.3	6.5	6.6	3.7	2.8	2.0	1,945	2,559	42.3	55.7	614
Orust	V Götaland N	87.9	10,860	28.3	25.7	17.9	4.7	6.5	6.5	4.9	4.3	1.3	4,807	5,917	44.3	54.5	1,110
Osby	Skåne NE	84.7	8,248	27.2	36.4	15.8	3.5	4.8	6.5	2.5	2.3	0.9	3,130	5,041	37.9	61.1	1,911
Oskarshamn	Kalmar	85.9	17,695	31.2	27.7	18.9	4.4	4.2	7.4	1.8	3.3	1.2	7,363	10,119	41.6	57.2	2,756
Ovanåker	Gävleborg	84.3	7,510	31.5	24.2	13.9	3.6	9.9	11.5	2.5	2.1	0.8	3,566	3,881	47.5	51.7	315
Oxelösund	Södermanland	83.1	7,484	39.1	22.5	17.0	6.9	3.7	3.4	2.9	2.6	2.1	3,929	3,397	52.5	45.4	532
Pajala	Norrbotten	79.5	3,669	35.3	23.3	9.6	15.1	3.5	8.3	2.1	1.5	1.3	2,053	1,567	56.0	42.7	486
Partille	V Götaland W	85.1	23,845	28.6	17.8	21.7	6.5	6.8	5.4	6.2	5.9	1.2	11,469	12,099	48.1	50.7	630
Perstorp	Skåne NE	79.2	4,031	26.5	40.9	14.5	3.8	4.1	5.5	1.7	2.0	0.9	1,456	2,537	36.1	62.9	1,081
Piteå	Norrbotten	87.7	29,052	48.0	16.1	12.8	6.9	6.0	4.0	3.0	2.0	1.1	18,576	10,170	63.9	35.0	8,406
Ragunda	Jämtland	84.8	3,324	38.7	27.1	9.3	5.4	8.7	5.9	2.5	1.1	1.4	1,835	1,443	55.2	43.4	392
Robertsfors	Västerbotten	84.3	4,302	39.6	15.4	13.2	6.3	12.9	5.1	4.3	2.1	1.2	2,715	1,537	63.1	35.7	1,178
Ronneby	Blekinge	85.4	18,546	30.7	31.1	16.3	4.7	4.6	5.4	2.5	3.3	1.6	7,866	10,389	42.4	56.0	2,523
Rättvik	Dalarna	86.0	7,686	28.6	29.2	16.5	3.7	6.9	7.4	3.7	2.6	1.4	3,291	4,289	42.8	55.8	998
Sala	Västmanland	85.8	14,805	30.5	27.2	16.8	5.3	7.3	5.6	3.0	3.0	1.4	6,823	7,781	46.1	52.6	958
Salem	Stockholm	85.0	10,070	27.9	19.6	23.8	4.8	6.7	5.7	5.0	5.1	1.5	4,464	5,454	44.3	54.2	990
Sandviken	Gävleborg	83.2	24,374	37.1	26.0	15.6	5.8	4.8	4.1	2.6	3.0	1.1	12,241	11,853	50.2	48.6	388
Sigtuna	Stockholm	77.4	25,280	27.6	22.3	22.3	6.3	5.3	5.9	3.4	4.1	2.9	10,749	13,805	42.5	54.6	3,056
Simrishamn	Skåne NE	85.4	13,238	25.5	27.6	18.4	5.0	5.8	5.3	6.2	4.5	1.6	5,631	7,398	42.5	55.9	1,767
Sjöbo	Skåne S	85.5	12,612	19.1	42.6	17.7	2.7	4.3	6.9	2.7	2.9	1.1	3,634	8,837	28.8	70.1	5,203
Skara	V Götaland E	84.9	11,904	31.7	24.5	18.8	4.6	6.5	6.0	3.5	3.2	1.2	5,521	6,239	46.4	52.4	718
Skinnskatteberg	Västmanland	83.2	2,787	34.4	31.4	11.6	5.2	4.1	5.3	2.8	4.2	1.0	1,294	1,464	46.4	52.5	170
Skellefteå	Västerbotten	85.4	47,884	45.2	15.3	13.3	6.6	7.4	4.4	4.0	2.6	1.0	30,272	17,113	63.2	35.7	13,159
Skurup	Skåne S	86.2	10,464	24.1	34.9	20.1	3.8	5.1	5.0	2.4	3.3	1.3	3,697	6,629	35.3	63.4	2,932
Skövde	V Götaland E	85.2	36,748	31.2	20.8	20.9	4.7	6.5	7.0	3.6	4.0	1.4	16,906	19,330	46.0	52.6	2,424
Smedjebacken	Dalarna	86.4	7,368	36.3	30.5	14.1	5.3	4.1	4.1	2.4	1.9	1.2	3,549	3,731	48.2	50.6	182
Sollefteå	Västernorrland	84.0	11,979	39.1	25.1	7.4	8.3	8.8	6.0	2.3	1.5	1.5	7,009	4,794	58.5	40.0	2,215
Sollentuna	Stockholm	84.7	44,031	26.8	12.9	24.9	6.2	9.4	4.5	5.8	7.7	1.7	21,261	22,031	48.3	50.0	770
Solna	Stockholm	83.8	50,061	29.5	12.5	21.2	8.9	8.6	3.8	6.9	6.8	1.7	26,997	22,213	53.9	44.4	4,784
Sorsele	Västerbotten	81.3	1,457	39.2	21.8	11.4	7.3	7.8	7.1	2.3	2.2	1.0	824	618	56.7	42.4	206
Sotenäs	V Götaland N	88.3	6,668	28.0	24.2	22.0	3.0	5.6	7.6	3.2	5.5	0.9	2,652	3,954	39.8	59.3	1,302
Staffanstorp	Skåne S	88.6	16,559	26.3	23.2	26.9	3.2	6.2	4.5	3.5	5.4	0.9	6,478	9,935	39.1	60.0	3,457
Stenungsund	V Götaland W	88.3	18,154	27.8	23.8	22.1	4.2	5.8	6.0	4.0	4.9	1.4	7,584	10,307	41.8	56.8	2,723
Stockholm	Stockholm C	84.0	606,751	28.1	10.7	19.1	11.7	8.5	3.2	10.0	6.9	1.9	353,707	241,326	58.3	39.9	112,381
Storfors	Värmland	85.1	2,597	36.1	30.9	14.1	4.3	4.6	4.4	2.1	2.0	1.5	1,224	1,333	47.1	51.3	109
Storuman	Västerbotten	81.6	3,624	34.4	23.1	13.1	7.1	6.4	7.9	3.2	3.9	0.8	1,854	1,740	51.2	48.0	114
Strängnäs	Södermanland	86.2	24,053	27.2	23.4	23.8	4.0	6.7	4.9	4.1	4.6	1.3	10,107	13,633	42.0	56.7	3,526
Strömstad	V Götaland N	80.9	7,256	29.1	25.6	17.3	4.9	5.8	6.5	4.5	4.8	1.5	3,213	3,934	44.3	54.2	721
Strömsund	Jämtland	82.6	7,195	38.1	27.5	12.0	5.3	6.9	5.7	1.9	1.5	1.2	3,757	3,354	52.2	46.6	403
Sundbyberg	Stockholm	81.2	30,744	31.3	12.7	20.0	10.9	7.5	3.5	6.3	5.9	1.7	17,239	12,989	56.1	42.2	4,250
Sundsvall	Västernorrland	85.4	64,770	37.8	20.0	16.7	5.7	6.4	5.0	3.8	3.6	1.1	34,735	29,349	53.6	45.3	5,386
Sunne	Värmland	86.1	8,797	28.1	24.4	19.6	3.4	9.5	7.3	3.1	3.5	1.1	3,874	4,825	44.0	54.8	951
Surahammar	Västmanland	83.7	6,185	34.7	33.7	13.9	5.0	2.7	4.4	1.9	2.5	1.0	2,749	3,374	44.4	54.6	625
Svalöv	Skåne W	84.8	8,485	24.7	36.7	14.5	4.5	5.8	5.3	3.7	3.1	1.7	3,281	5,059	38.7	59.6	1,778
Svedala	Skåne S	89.3	14,670	24.8	32.7	22.0	3.0	4.9	5.4	2.8	3.5	0.9	5,205	9,329	35.5	63.6	4,124
Svenljunga	V Götaland S	84.6	6,768	25.4	31.7	17.6	3.7	6.7	7.9	2.7	3.1	1.1	2,610	4,081	38.6	60.3	1,471
Säffle	Värmland	84.8	9,786	28.0	29.3	16.7	3.6	9.1	7.5	2.1	2.7	1.0	4,182	5,503	42.7	56.2	1,321
Säter	Dalarna	87.3	7,563	30.9	26.7	16.6	4.5	7.9	6.5	3.0	2.6	1.3	3,504	3,963	46.3	52.4	459
Sävsjö	Jönköping	85.8	7,119	22.5	29.7	17.3	3.0	6.9	14.8	1.6	2.2	2.1	2,423	4,550	34.0	63.9	2,127
Söderhamn	Gävleborg	81.7	15,899	37.5	24.9	14.8	5.1	6.3	4.9	2.9	2.3	1.3	8,228	7,459	51.8	46.9	769
Söderköping	Östergötland	88.8	10,026	24.4	26.7	21.4	4.1	7.1	7.1	3.7	4.4	1.1	3,944	5,972	39.3	59.6	2,028
Södertälje	Stockholm	70.6	46,786	28.5	20.9	20.6	7.0	4.5	8.2	4.8	3.6	1.8	21,000	24,964	44.9	53.4	3,964
Sölvesborg	Blekinge	86.2	11,820	26.7	35.4	19.2	3.2	3.7	5.9	1.8	3.0	1.1	4,181	7,512	35.4	63.6	3,331
Tanum	V Götaland N	86.4	8,759	24.4	24.1	21.6	4.1	8.4	7.4	4.5	4.4	1.1	3,624	5,039	41.4	57.5	1,415
Tibro	V Götaland E	84.5	7,223	31.7	25.6	16.3	3.7	6.3	8.6	2.4	4.3	1.2	3,179	3,954	44.0	54.7	775
Tidaholm	V Götaland E	87.2	8,559	35.1	27.6	13.7	4.0	5.3	7.6	2.6	3.1	1.1	4,015	4,451	46.9	52.0	436
Tierp	Uppsala	85.3	13,600	34.1	26.6	14.4	4.7	7.1	5.9	3.3	2.6	1.3	6,697	6,729	49.2	49.5	32
Timrå	Västernorrland	85.5	11,810	41.0	26.3	12.6	5.1	5.0	4.9	2.1	2.2	0.9	6,282	5,426	53.2	45.9	856
Tingsryd	Kronoberg	85.1	7,745	27.3	32.8	15.4	3.9	6.4	8.4	2.4	2.1	1.3	3,098	4,543	40.0	58.7	1,445
Tjörn	V Götaland W	89.4	11,328	25.4	24.3	19.9	3.7	5.5	9.9	4.0	6.4	0.9	4,372	6,854	38.6	60.5	2,482
Tomelilla	Skåne NE	85.4	8,750	23.3	37.2	17.0	4.0	5.8	5.5	3.5	2.6	1.2	3,198	5,445	36.5	62.2	2,247
Torsby	Värmland	83.2	7,177	32.8	28.9	16.2	4.2	5.9	6.4	2.1	2.3	1.2	3,225	3,868	44.9	53.9	643
Torsås	Kalmar	87.0	4,748	26.5	34.1	14.3	3.8	7.1	7.5	2.8	2.8	1.3	1,905	2,783	40.1	58.6	878
Tranemo	V Götaland S	85.9	7,607	30.0	24.3	19.1	4.1	8.7	6.5	3.0	2.9	1.4	3,483	4,018	45.8	52.8	535
Tranås	Jönköping	85.6	12,009	33.9	23.2	18.2	3.7	6.3	6.9	3.2	3.4	1.1	5,658	6,216	47.1	51.8	558
Trelleborg	Skåne S	83.8	28,726	26.9	32.0	20.0	3.6	4.5	5.6	2.3	3.8	1.3	10,717	17,633	37.3	61.4	6,916
Trollhättan	V Götaland N	83.0	36,047	35.7	20.8	19.0	6.1	5.4	4.8	3.5	3.4	1.3	18,277	17,288	50.7	48.0	989
Trosa	Södermanland	88.5	9,650	27.3	23.3	24.5	3.4	6.5	5.0	4.7	4.1	1.1	4,049	5,499	42.0	57.0	1,450
Tyresö	Stockholm	86.9	30,322	29.8	18.9	23.6	5.1	6.6	3.9	5.3	5.5	1.2	14,204	15,751	46.8	51.9	1,547
Täby	Stockholm	88.6	47,733	19.8	12.9	33.9	2.8	9.9	5.2	4.6	9.7	1.1	17,712	29,518	37.1	61.8	11,806
Töreboda	V Götaland E	84.7	5,876	29.9	29.9	17.3	3.9	6.5	5.7	2.2	2.4	2.2	2,502	3,246	42.6	55.2	744
Uddevalla	V Götaland N	84.0	35,755	31.0	24.6	17.5	5.7	5.1	6.5	4.0	3.6	2.0	16,333	18,702	45.7	52.3	2,369
Ulricehamn	V Götaland S	86.3	16,163	27.0	23.9	19.8	4.4	9.0	7.1	3.5	4.0	1.2	7,097	8,865	43.9	54.8	1,768
Umeå	Västerbotten	87.5	85,994	39.8	10.8	14.9	10.6	7.9	3.6	7.6	3.6	1.1	56,699	28,327	65.9	32.9	28,372
Upplands-Bro	Stockholm	81.3	16,471	28.2	22.8	21.4	7.0	5.3	5.5	3.4	4.4	1.9	7,237	8,914	43.9	54.1	1,677
Upplands Väsby	Stockholm	79.5	25,908	30.1	20.9	20.5	7.6	5.9	5.0	3.6	4.3	1.9	12,249	13,156	47.3	50.8	907
Uppsala	Uppsala	86.3	150,144	29.4	13.0	17.6	10.2	7.8	5.4	8.9	5.9	1.9	84,507	62,842	56.3	41.9	21,665
Uppvidinge	Kronoberg	84.9	5,586	27.6	31.7	16.3	4.1	6.5	7.8	2.2	2.3	1.5	2,257	3,246	40.4	58.1	989
Vadstena	Östergötland	88.8	5,434	31.7	19.9	21.2	4.5	6.8	6.3	5.1	3.9	0.6	2,616	2,784	48.1	51.2	168
Vaggeryd	Jönköping	86.8	9,138	29.8	25.1	16.4	3.3	7.5	10.3	2.5	3.5	1.6	3,945	5,046	43.2	55.2	1,101
Valdemarsvik	Östergötland	87.1	5,285	29.8	29.2	17.1	4.1	6.4	7.3	2.0	2.7	1.3	2,241	2,975	42.4	56.3	734
Vallentuna	Stockholm	81.7	21,293	24.1	20.7	26.0	3.7	7.9	5.2	5.2	6.0	1.2	8,714	12,324	40.9	57.9	3,610
Vansbro	Dalarna	84.1	4,390	28.7	28.3	14.1	4.8	8.2	10.7	1.9	1.9	1.5	1,912	2,412	43.6	54.9	500
Vara	V Götaland E	85.6	10,329	25.0	29.9	22.0	3.8	7.5	6.4	1.8	2.6	0.8	3,941	6,303	38.2	61.0	2,362
Varberg	Halland	88.1	45,248	31.3	20.3	20.7	4.4	7.8	5.9	3.9	4.7	1.0	21,398	23,387	47.3	51.7	1,989
Vaxholm	Stockholm	89.7	8,110	22.4	15.6	28.7	2.9	10.1	5.2	6.3	7.9	0.9	3,375	4,659	41.6	57.4	1,284
Vellinge	Skåne S	91.6	26,093	14.8	25.3	35.7	1.2	6.1	6.3	2.2	7.6	0.7	6,362	19,553	24.4	74.9	13,191
Vetlanda	Jönköping	85.1	17,408	27.5	27.9	17.7	3.0	7.6	9.6	2.3	2.9	1.4	7,045	10,120	40.5	58.1	3,075
Vilhelmina	Västerbotten	81.7	4,080	35.2	25.8	10.5	7.8	6.5	8.9	2.0	1.4	1.7	2,105	1,904	51.6	46.7	201
Vimmerby	Kalmar	85.5	10,122	30.4	24.9	17.8	4.6	8.1	7.8	3.0	1.8	1.7	4,668	5,286	46.1	52.2	618
Vindeln	Västerbotten	83.8	3,389	34.0	21.7	16.6	5.3	9.6	6.3	2.9	2.5	1.1	1,754	1,597	51.8	47.1	157
Vingåker	Södermanland	86.8	5,901	33.1	28.8	16.8	4.5	5.0	5.2	3.3	2.1	1.1	2,712	3,125	46.0	53.0	413
Vårgårda	V Götaland S	87.5	7,795	26.8	24.6	15.4	4.3	9.6	10.4	4.1	3.5	1.4	3,488	4,200	44.7	53.9	712
Vänersborg	V Götaland N	85.2	25,419	32.8	25.9	15.9	5.6	5.6	5.8	3.4	3.7	1.2	12,058	13,050	47.4	51.3	992
Vännäs	Västerbotten	84.3	5,594	36.6	18.4	15.0	8.0	9.1	4.9	4.5	2.2	1.4	3,255	2,263	58.2	40.5	992
Värmdö	Stockholm	88.4	29,584	26.5	19.8	23.7	4.7	8.0	4.5	6.4	5.4	1.1	13,473	15,792	45.5	53.4	2,319
Värnamo	Jönköping	85.2	21,958	29.2	22.2	20.8	3.5	8.4	9.1	2.4	3.3	1.0	9,572	12,157	43.6	55.4	2,585
Västervik	Kalmar	84.0	24,289	34.4	23.2	17.4	4.5	6.1	6.2	3.2	3.5	1.6	11,700	12,209	48.2	50.3	509
Västerås	Västmanland	82.5	95,133	31.0	19.9	22.1	6.4	5.8	4.7	3.6	5.1	1.3	44,523	49,338	46.8	51.9	4,815
Växjö	Kronoberg	86.4	60,608	32.5	17.9	21.4	6.0	6.3	5.8	4.5	4.0	1.5	29,932	29,773	49.4	49.1	159
Ydre	Östergötland	89.6	2,574	25.9	24.5	16.2	2.9	11.2	10.8	4.0	3.3	1.2	1,134	1,409	44.1	54.7	275
Ystad	Skåne S	86.1	21,427	27.3	27.0	22.0	3.6	4.9	6.0	3.6	4.6	1.1	8,452	12,745	39.4	59.5	4,293
Åmål	V Götaland N	83.2	7,895	33.0	28.2	15.7	5.2	5.0	5.7	3.1	2.9	1.2	3,657	4,146	46.3	52.5	489
Ånge	Västernorrland	84.5	6,090	37.2	29.8	12.3	4.8	5.5	6.0	1.5	1.7	1.1	2,983	3,040	49.0	49.9	57
Åre	Jämtland	86.8	7,779	32.1	16.6	15.8	5.5	11.8	4.9	8.5	3.6	1.2	4,505	3,182	57.9	40.9	1,323
Årjäng	Värmland	82.4	5,607	23.9	30.6	12.6	2.5	7.0	17.8	2.0	2.8	0.8	1,984	3,577	35.4	63.8	1,593
Åsele	Västerbotten	82.0	1,725	37.7	22.4	12.9	5.4	10.0	5.3	1.7	3.2	1.3	947	755	54.9	43.8	192
Åstorp	Skåne NE	79.4	8,704	28.2	38.1	16.7	3.9	3.3	5.0	1.4	2.1	1.3	3,207	5,387	36.8	61.9	2,180
Åtvidaberg	Östergötland	87.7	7,852	34.8	25.8	16.2	3.7	6.2	6.3	3.1	3.0	0.9	3,746	4,032	47.7	51.3	286
Älmhult	Kronoberg	85.3	10,247	31.9	24.5	19.4	3.9	6.6	6.9	2.9	2.7	1.2	4,640	5,479	45.3	53.5	839
Älvdalen	Dalarna	85.5	4,615	28.7	35.9	10.6	3.5	6.6	8.0	2.1	1.9	2.8	1,884	2,602	40.8	56.4	718
Älvkarleby	Uppsala	84.2	6,088	35.5	31.0	14.5	4.6	3.3	4.3	2.9	2.4	1.4	2,824	3,180	46.4	52.2	356
Älvsbyn	Norrbotten	83.3	5,110	43.2	20.5	13.3	6.1	6.6	5.4	1.5	2.3	1.1	2,939	2,117	57.5	41.4	822
Ängelholm	Skåne NE	85.9	28,920	25.8	28.0	22.9	3.1	5.8	6.3	3.4	3.9	1.0	10,973	17,650	37.9	61.0	6,677
Öckerö	V Götaland W	90.8	9,146	24.8	22.1	19.8	4.2	4.8	14.1	4.5	4.5	1.1	3,501	5,540	38.3	60.6	2,039
Ödeshög	Östergötland	87.1	3,535	24.4	26.9	17.5	2.8	7.8	12.9	3.9	2.1	1.7	1,373	2,102	38.8	59.5	729
Örebro	Örebro	84.1	98,115	32.6	17.1	17.5	7.3	7.0	5.6	5.2	5.9	1.8	51,165	45,231	52.1	46.1	5,934
Örkelljunga	Skåne NE	83.7	6,331	21.6	39.3	14.2	2.5	4.4	11.2	2.2	2.5	2.1	1,945	4,254	30.7	67.2	2,309
Örnsköldsvik	Västernorrland	85.9	36,572	41.5	17.1	14.2	4.5	9.7	6.7	2.9	2.3	1.2	21,390	14,737	58.5	40.3	6,653
Östersund	Jämtland	85.1	41,749	37.7	16.6	15.4	6.0	8.9	5.0	5.8	3.1	1.3	24,411	16,791	58.5	40.2	7,620
Österåker	Stockholm	87.3	29,997	24.9	19.4	27.5	3.7	7.5	4.7	4.7	6.4	1.2	12,242	17,385	40.8	58.0	5,143
Östhammar	Uppsala	85.0	14,657	30.4	27.0	18.5	3.7	5.4	8.0	2.6	3.3	1.0	6,171	8,335	42.1	56.9	2,164
Östra Göinge	Skåne NE	84.0	8,799	25.5	38.1	17.4	3.2	4.4	6.1	2.0	2.2	1.2	3,086	5,610	35.1	63.8	2,524
Överkalix	Norrbotten	81.3	2,076	42.9	23.3	10.1	7.8	5.8	5.7	1.5	1.8	1.0	1,204	851	58.0	41.0	353
Övertorneå	Norrbotten	78.2	2,473	37.4	19.8	10.5	6.8	12.2	8.9	1.6	1.7	1.0	1,437	1,011	58.1	40.9	426
Total		84.2	6,477,794	30.3	20.5	19.1	6.8	6.7	5.3	5.1	4.6	1.5	3,165,711	3,212,007	48.8	49.6	46,296
Source: Sweden's Election Authority

=== Blekinge ===
Location	Turnout	Share	Votes	S	SD	M	V	C	KD	MP	L	Other	L-vote	R-vote	Left	Right	Margin
Location	%	%		%	%	%	%	%	%	%	%	%			%	%	
Karlshamn	85.2	20.3	21,015	31.7	28.8	17.8	4.6	4.7	4.9	3.3	3.0	1.1	9,322	11,460	44.4	54.5	2,138
Karlskrona	87.8	42.6	44,082	31.9	24.4	19.0	4.6	5.4	5.9	3.4	4.3	1.2	19,935	23,601	45.2	53.5	3,666
Olofström	80.9	7.8	8,117	33.0	34.7	13.3	4.6	4.5	4.9	2.0	2.0	0.9	3,580	4,466	44.1	55.0	886
Ronneby	85.4	17.9	18,546	30.7	31.1	16.3	4.7	4.6	5.4	2.5	3.3	1.6	7,866	10,389	42.4	56.0	2,523
Sölvesborg	86.2	11.4	11,820	26.7	35.4	19.2	3.2	3.7	5.9	1.8	3.0	1.1	4,181	7,512	35.4	63.6	3,331
Total	86.1	100.0	103,580	31.1	28.5	17.9	4.4	4.8	5.5	2.9	3.5	1.2	44,884	57,428	43.3	55.4	12,544
Source: Sweden's Election Authority

=== Dalarna ===
Location	Turnout	Share	Votes	S	SD	M	V	C	KD	MP	L	Other	L-vote	R-vote	Left	Right	Margin
Location	%	%		%	%	%	%	%	%	%	%	%			%	%	
Avesta	84.1	7.7	14,343	35.7	27.9	15.3	4.6	4.9	5.4	2.2	2.6	1.1	6,792	7,347	47.4	51.2	555
Borlänge	83.1	17.1	31,848	34.0	24.5	16.7	6.0	5.3	4.8	3.7	3.5	1.5	15,595	15,765	49.0	49.5	170
Falun	87.0	21.2	39,594	31.4	18.6	18.6	6.0	8.1	5.6	6.2	4.0	1.5	20,495	18,504	51.8	46.7	1,991
Gagnef	87.9	3.7	6,968	27.0	27.8	15.3	4.9	8.2	9.0	3.9	2.9	1.0	3,070	3,830	44.1	55.0	760
Hedemora	83.3	5.2	9,743	29.6	28.8	16.1	5.6	6.2	6.2	3.5	2.1	1.7	4,385	5,190	45.0	53.3	805
Leksand	87.8	5.9	11,018	29.8	21.4	18.6	5.1	7.9	8.1	4.2	3.6	1.2	5,197	5,690	47.2	51.6	493
Ludvika	84.3	8.7	16,327	35.2	28.1	14.1	6.2	4.6	4.7	2.8	2.9	1.4	7,970	8,135	48.8	49.8	165
Malung-Sälen	86.4	3.6	6,786	26.2	32.1	18.9	4.1	5.4	6.5	1.9	3.3	1.7	2,552	4,122	37.6	60.7	1,570
Mora	85.3	7.4	13,751	29.6	29.0	16.0	4.3	7.1	6.5	3.3	2.9	1.3	6,094	7,473	44.3	54.3	1,379
Orsa	84.7	2.5	4,598	26.8	32.9	13.4	5.3	6.5	6.6	3.7	2.8	2.0	1,945	2,559	42.3	55.7	614
Rättvik	86.0	4.1	7,686	28.6	29.2	16.5	3.7	6.9	7.4	3.7	2.6	1.4	3,291	4,289	42.8	55.8	998
Smedjebacken	86.4	3.9	7,368	36.3	30.5	14.1	5.3	4.1	4.1	2.4	1.9	1.2	3,549	3,731	48.2	50.6	182
Säter	87.3	4.1	7,563	30.9	26.7	16.6	4.5	7.9	6.5	3.0	2.6	1.3	3,504	3,963	46.3	52.4	459
Vansbro	84.1	2.4	4,390	28.7	28.3	14.1	4.8	8.2	10.7	1.9	1.9	1.5	1,912	2,412	43.6	54.9	500
Älvdalen	85.5	2.5	4,615	28.7	35.9	10.6	3.5	6.6	8.0	2.1	1.9	2.8	1,884	2,602	40.8	56.4	718
Total	85.4	100.0	186,598	31.7	25.7	16.4	5.3	6.5	6.0	3.8	3.1	1.5	88,235	95,612	47.3	51.2	7,377
Source: Sweden's Election Authority

=== Gotland ===
Location	Turnout	Share	Votes	S	SD	M	V	C	KD	MP	L	Other	L-vote	R-vote	Left	Right	Margin
Location	%	%		%	%	%	%	%	%	%	%	%			%	%	
Gotland	87.1	100.0	41,456	34.6	15.7	16.8	6.4	11.7	4.0	6.5	2.8	1.5	24,544	16,287	59.2	39.3	8,257
Total	87.1	100.0	41,456	34.6	15.7	16.8	6.4	11.7	4.0	6.5	2.8	1.5	24,544	16,287	59.2	39.3	8,257
Source: Sweden's Election Authority

=== Gävleborg ===
Location	Turnout	Share	Votes	S	SD	M	V	C	KD	MP	L	Other	L-vote	R-vote	Left	Right	Margin
Location	%	%		%	%	%	%	%	%	%	%	%			%	%	
Bollnäs	83.4	9.3	16,939	36.0	24.6	13.9	5.1	7.5	6.2	3.0	2.6	1.0	8,746	8,018	51.6	47.3	728
Gävle	84.0	35.9	65,558	33.3	22.6	19.2	6.5	5.0	4.3	4.0	3.8	1.4	32,026	32,624	48.9	49.8	598
Hofors	82.3	3.3	6,006	36.4	27.8	13.6	8.3	3.9	4.4	2.3	2.1	1.1	3,052	2,889	50.8	48.1	163
Hudiksvall	83.9	13.4	24,441	36.4	21.2	14.6	6.3	8.4	5.3	4.3	2.5	1.2	13,515	10,627	55.3	43.5	2,888
Ljusdal	82.8	6.6	12,043	32.1	26.2	16.0	4.6	8.0	5.6	3.5	3.0	1.1	5,795	6,116	48.1	50.8	321
Nordanstig	82.5	3.3	6,017	31.6	29.0	13.1	6.2	7.1	6.5	2.9	2.2	1.4	2,877	3,056	47.8	50.8	179
Ockelbo	84.7	2.1	3,800	33.2	30.8	12.3	5.2	7.3	5.0	3.4	1.9	1.0	1,865	1,897	49.1	49.9	32
Ovanåker	84.3	4.1	7,510	31.5	24.2	13.9	3.6	9.9	11.5	2.5	2.1	0.8	3,566	3,881	47.5	51.7	315
Sandviken	83.2	13.3	24,374	37.1	26.0	15.6	5.8	4.8	4.1	2.6	3.0	1.1	12,241	11,853	50.2	48.6	388
Söderhamn	81.7	8.7	15,899	37.5	24.9	14.8	5.1	6.3	4.9	2.9	2.3	1.3	8,228	7,459	51.8	46.9	769
Total	83.5	100.0	182,587	34.7	24.1	16.2	5.9	6.2	5.1	3.5	3.0	1.2	91,911	88,420	50.3	48.4	3,491
Source: Sweden's Election Authority

=== Halland ===
Location	Turnout	Share	Votes	S	SD	M	V	C	KD	MP	L	Other	L-vote	R-vote	Left	Right	Margin
Location	%	%		%	%	%	%	%	%	%	%	%			%	%	
Falkenberg	85.6	13.7	30,318	31.5	21.7	20.1	4.2	8.5	5.5	3.5	4.0	1.0	14,452	15,558	47.7	51.3	1,106
Halmstad	83.8	29.6	65,548	31.6	21.7	20.8	4.9	6.1	5.5	3.6	4.4	1.5	30,261	34,327	46.2	52.4	4,066
Hylte	82.1	2.7	6,036	30.3	30.5	14.7	3.6	7.7	7.2	2.5	2.7	0.9	2,663	3,318	44.1	55.0	655
Kungsbacka	90.3	26.0	57,603	21.2	22.6	29.0	3.0	6.6	6.4	3.8	6.4	1.0	19,927	37,078	34.6	64.4	17,151
Laholm	85.4	7.6	16,922	25.1	30.9	18.5	3.0	7.4	7.3	2.8	3.9	1.1	6,481	10,255	38.3	60.6	3,774
Varberg	88.1	20.4	45,248	31.3	20.3	20.7	4.4	7.8	5.9	3.9	4.7	1.0	21,398	23,387	47.3	51.7	1,989
Total	86.6	100.0	221,675	28.3	22.6	22.5	4.0	7.0	6.0	3.6	4.8	1.1	95,182	123,923	42.9	55.9	28,741
Source: Sweden's Election Authority

=== Jämtland ===
Location	Turnout	Share	Votes	S	SD	M	V	C	KD	MP	L	Other	L-vote	R-vote	Left	Right	Margin
Location	%	%		%	%	%	%	%	%	%	%	%			%	%	
Berg	83.7	5.4	4,554	32.4	24.5	17.3	4.3	9.5	5.7	3.4	1.4	1.5	2,261	2,226	49.6	48.9	35
Bräcke	82.7	4.6	3,930	36.8	27.6	13.1	4.6	8.1	4.8	2.5	1.2	1.2	2,046	1,837	52.1	46.7	209
Härjedalen	83.4	7.9	6,688	33.4	25.5	13.4	5.5	8.0	6.8	3.0	3.0	1.3	3,341	3,259	50.0	48.7	82
Krokom	87.3	11.5	9,805	33.0	21.3	15.5	5.3	10.7	6.1	5.1	2.0	1.1	5,299	4,397	54.0	44.8	902
Ragunda	84.8	3.9	3,324	38.7	27.1	9.3	5.4	8.7	5.9	2.5	1.1	1.4	1,835	1,443	55.2	43.4	392
Strömsund	82.6	8.5	7,195	38.1	27.5	12.0	5.3	6.9	5.7	1.9	1.5	1.2	3,757	3,354	52.2	46.6	403
Åre	86.8	9.1	7,779	32.1	16.6	15.8	5.5	11.8	4.9	8.5	3.6	1.2	4,505	3,182	57.9	40.9	1,323
Östersund	85.1	49.1	41,749	37.7	16.6	15.4	6.0	8.9	5.0	5.8	3.1	1.3	24,411	16,791	58.5	40.2	7,620
Total	85.0	100.0	85,024	36.1	20.1	14.8	5.6	9.1	5.4	5.0	2.6	1.3	47,455	36,489	55.8	42.9	10,966
Source: Sweden's Election Authority

=== Jönköping ===
Location	Turnout	Share	Votes	S	SD	M	V	C	KD	MP	L	Other	L-vote	R-vote	Left	Right	Margin
Location	%	%		%	%	%	%	%	%	%	%	%			%	%	
Aneby	88.2	1.9	4,465	25.0	26.9	16.8	2.7	9.3	11.4	2.7	3.4	1.7	1,770	2,617	39.6	58.6	847
Eksjö	86.6	5.0	11,457	28.5	24.4	17.8	3.6	9.1	8.0	3.0	3.8	1.9	5,063	6,178	44.2	53.9	1,115
Gislaved	81.6	7.5	17,174	29.0	27.6	19.3	3.5	7.1	7.8	1.8	3.0	0.9	7,113	9,902	41.4	57.7	2,789
Gnosjö	81.6	2.4	5,518	24.6	26.5	20.6	2.6	7.2	13.0	1.7	3.0	0.7	1,992	3,485	36.1	63.2	1,493
Habo	91.5	3.6	8,256	26.3	23.8	20.5	2.8	7.0	11.1	3.3	3.8	1.4	3,251	4,891	39.4	59.2	1,640
Jönköping	85.2	39.5	90,470	29.9	19.4	19.4	4.8	7.6	9.1	4.2	4.4	1.3	41,998	47,321	46.4	52.3	5,323
Mullsjö	88.7	2.1	4,903	26.0	27.0	16.4	3.9	5.7	12.5	3.8	3.2	1.4	1,933	2,899	39.4	59.1	966
Nässjö	84.7	8.4	19,250	30.0	28.0	15.9	4.0	6.2	8.4	3.0	3.2	1.3	8,329	10,675	43.3	55.5	2,346
Sävsjö	85.8	3.1	7,119	22.5	29.7	17.3	3.0	6.9	14.8	1.6	2.2	2.1	2,423	4,550	34.0	63.9	2,127
Tranås	85.6	5.2	12,009	33.9	23.2	18.2	3.7	6.3	6.9	3.2	3.4	1.1	5,658	6,216	47.1	51.8	558
Vaggeryd	86.8	4.0	9,138	29.8	25.1	16.4	3.3	7.5	10.3	2.5	3.5	1.6	3,945	5,046	43.2	55.2	1,101
Vetlanda	85.1	7.6	17,408	27.5	27.9	17.7	3.0	7.6	9.6	2.3	2.9	1.4	7,045	10,120	40.5	58.1	3,075
Värnamo	85.2	9.6	21,958	29.2	22.2	20.8	3.5	8.4	9.1	2.4	3.3	1.0	9,572	12,157	43.6	55.4	2,585
Total	85.3	100.0	229,125	29.1	23.3	18.7	4.0	7.5	9.3	3.2	3.7	1.3	100,092	126,057	43.7	55.0	25,965
Source: Sweden's Election Authority

=== Kalmar ===
Location	Turnout	Share	Votes	S	SD	M	V	C	KD	MP	L	Other	L-vote	R-vote	Left	Right	Margin
Location	%	%		%	%	%	%	%	%	%	%	%			%	%	
Borgholm	86.8	4.8	7,715	28.1	25.5	17.8	3.8	8.7	7.4	4.4	3.1	1.3	3,469	4,148	45.0	53.8	679
Emmaboda	84.9	3.6	5,763	33.4	28.0	14.6	4.4	6.9	6.3	2.7	2.4	1.4	2,726	2,959	47.3	51.3	233
Hultsfred	82.9	5.2	8,445	33.6	26.3	12.4	4.6	7.3	10.2	1.8	1.9	1.7	4,002	4,299	47.4	50.9	297
Högsby	83.9	2.0	3,304	30.8	30.7	11.8	3.9	7.7	10.7	1.8	1.2	1.4	1,462	1,797	44.2	54.4	335
Kalmar	87.0	29.0	46,794	31.8	20.1	20.6	5.5	6.4	5.9	4.7	3.9	1.2	22,635	23,613	48.4	50.5	978
Mönsterås	87.3	5.4	8,753	31.6	30.6	14.0	3.6	6.3	8.0	2.2	2.6	1.2	3,815	4,834	43.6	55.2	1,019
Mörbylånga	90.4	6.8	10,961	29.6	22.7	19.5	4.1	7.6	7.5	4.7	3.5	0.8	5,050	5,827	46.1	53.2	777
Nybro	84.8	7.9	12,678	32.7	27.2	15.7	4.7	6.3	6.9	2.2	2.8	1.5	5,818	6,666	45.9	52.6	848
Oskarshamn	85.9	11.0	17,695	31.2	27.7	18.9	4.4	4.2	7.4	1.8	3.3	1.2	7,363	10,119	41.6	57.2	2,756
Torsås	87.0	2.9	4,748	26.5	34.1	14.3	3.8	7.1	7.5	2.8	2.8	1.3	1,905	2,783	40.1	58.6	878
Vimmerby	85.5	6.3	10,122	30.4	24.9	17.8	4.6	8.1	7.8	3.0	1.8	1.7	4,668	5,286	46.1	52.2	618
Västervik	84.0	15.1	24,289	34.4	23.2	17.4	4.5	6.1	6.2	3.2	3.5	1.6	11,700	12,209	48.2	50.3	509
Total	86.0	100.0	161,267	31.7	24.5	17.8	4.6	6.5	7.0	3.4	3.2	1.3	74,613	84,540	46.3	52.4	9,927
Source: Sweden's Election Authority

=== Kronoberg ===
Location	Turnout	Share	Votes	S	SD	M	V	C	KD	MP	L	Other	L-vote	R-vote	Left	Right	Margin
Location	%	%		%	%	%	%	%	%	%	%	%			%	%	
Alvesta	84.7	9.8	12,226	29.0	28.4	18.0	4.1	6.2	7.3	2.6	2.4	2.0	5,131	6,850	42.0	56.0	1,719
Lessebo	85.2	4.0	5,007	36.4	25.6	15.5	6.7	4.7	5.9	2.5	1.6	1.2	2,515	2,434	50.2	48.6	81
Ljungby	84.3	14.1	17,604	29.0	28.3	19.4	3.7	5.6	7.7	2.5	2.5	1.3	7,188	10,187	40.8	57.9	2,999
Markaryd	82.0	4.8	5,969	27.1	35.8	15.5	3.2	4.0	9.6	1.5	1.8	1.6	2,129	3,742	35.7	62.7	1,613
Tingsryd	85.1	6.2	7,745	27.3	32.8	15.4	3.9	6.4	8.4	2.4	2.1	1.3	3,098	4,543	40.0	58.7	1,445
Uppvidinge	84.9	4.5	5,586	27.6	31.7	16.3	4.1	6.5	7.8	2.2	2.3	1.5	2,257	3,246	40.4	58.1	989
Växjö	86.4	48.5	60,608	32.5	17.9	21.4	6.0	6.3	5.8	4.5	4.0	1.5	29,932	29,773	49.4	49.1	159
Älmhult	85.3	8.2	10,247	31.9	24.5	19.4	3.9	6.6	6.9	2.9	2.7	1.2	4,640	5,479	45.3	53.5	839
Total	85.4	100.0	124,992	31.0	23.6	19.5	5.0	6.0	6.8	3.5	3.1	1.5	56,890	66,254	45.5	53.0	9,364
Source: Sweden's Election Authority

=== Norrbotten ===
Location	Turnout	Share	Votes	S	SD	M	V	C	KD	MP	L	Other	L-vote	R-vote	Left	Right	Margin
Location	%	%		%	%	%	%	%	%	%	%	%			%	%	
Arjeplog	82.1	1.1	1,717	37.9	24.8	9.0	7.8	4.5	8.8	3.4	3.0	0.8	921	783	53.6	45.6	138
Arvidsjaur	85.0	2.5	4,002	42.0	24.0	10.8	7.1	5.6	5.1	1.3	3.2	0.9	2,243	1,724	56.0	43.1	519
Boden	85.4	11.5	18,574	42.2	22.7	14.7	5.2	4.8	4.5	2.5	2.3	1.1	10,162	8,216	54.7	44.2	1,946
Gällivare	81.0	6.8	10,959	38.5	27.2	13.0	8.2	2.8	4.3	3.6	1.4	1.1	5,810	5,024	53.0	45.8	786
Haparanda	69.1	2.6	4,220	35.9	30.9	13.5	3.8	6.2	5.1	1.9	1.7	1.0	2,015	2,164	47.7	51.3	149
Jokkmokk	81.6	1.9	3,026	34.2	22.5	9.9	9.2	4.4	4.5	11.8	2.0	1.5	1,804	1,177	59.6	38.9	627
Kalix	84.3	6.4	10,355	43.9	24.2	12.6	4.4	5.0	4.5	2.6	2.0	0.9	5,790	4,476	55.9	43.2	1,314
Kiruna	82.0	8.5	13,698	41.9	22.1	11.1	8.1	2.9	6.8	3.8	1.8	1.5	7,763	5,724	56.7	41.8	2,039
Luleå	86.9	32.5	52,524	39.5	17.4	15.7	7.2	5.9	5.3	4.3	3.6	1.1	29,889	22,053	56.9	42.0	7,836
Pajala	79.5	2.3	3,669	35.3	23.3	9.6	15.1	3.5	8.3	2.1	1.5	1.3	2,053	1,567	56.0	42.7	486
Piteå	87.7	18.0	29,052	48.0	16.1	12.8	6.9	6.0	4.0	3.0	2.0	1.1	18,576	10,170	63.9	35.0	8,406
Älvsbyn	83.3	3.2	5,110	43.2	20.5	13.3	6.1	6.6	5.4	1.5	2.3	1.1	2,939	2,117	57.5	41.4	822
Överkalix	81.3	1.3	2,076	42.9	23.3	10.1	7.8	5.8	5.7	1.5	1.8	1.0	1,204	851	58.0	41.0	353
Övertorneå	78.2	1.5	2,473	37.4	19.8	10.5	6.8	12.2	8.9	1.6	1.7	1.0	1,437	1,011	58.1	40.9	426
Total	84.6	100.0	161,455	41.6	20.3	13.6	7.0	5.3	5.1	3.4	2.5	1.1	92,606	67,057	57.4	41.5	25,549
Source: Sweden's Election Authority

=== Skåne ===
==== Malmö ====
Location	Turnout	Share	Votes	S	SD	M	V	C	KD	MP	L	Other	L-vote	R-vote	Left	Right	Margin
Location	%	%		%	%	%	%	%	%	%	%	%			%	%	
Malmö	77.2	100.0	192,043	29.6	16.4	17.9	12.5	5.5	3.0	7.5	4.5	3.2	105,707	80,205	55.0	41.8	25,502
Total	77.2	100.0	192,043	29.6	16.4	17.9	12.5	5.5	3.0	7.5	4.5	3.2	105,707	80,205	55.0	41.8	25,502
Source: Sweden's Election Authority

==== Skåne NE ====
Location	Turnout	Share	Votes	S	SD	M	V	C	KD	MP	L	Other	L-vote	R-vote	Left	Right	Margin
Location	%	%		%	%	%	%	%	%	%	%	%			%	%	
Bromölla	84.7	3.9	7,989	28.3	39.1	16.1	3.3	2.4	5.2	1.8	2.7	1.1	2,862	5,038	35.8	63.1	2,176
Båstad	87.1	5.4	10,883	20.7	24.7	25.8	2.6	7.6	6.9	4.2	6.2	1.1	3,837	6,925	35.3	63.6	3,088
Hässleholm	83.6	16.1	32,621	24.6	33.6	17.7	4.7	5.0	6.8	2.8	3.5	1.2	12,117	20,120	37.1	61.7	8,003
Klippan	82.2	5.2	10,544	23.7	40.3	15.7	3.5	4.1	6.6	2.3	2.2	1.7	3,542	6,827	33.6	64.7	3,285
Kristianstad	83.1	26.5	53,832	25.8	28.8	21.9	4.5	4.6	5.5	2.6	4.8	1.5	20,203	32,813	37.5	61.0	12,610
Osby	84.7	4.1	8,248	27.2	36.4	15.8	3.5	4.8	6.5	2.5	2.3	0.9	3,130	5,041	37.9	61.1	1,911
Perstorp	79.2	2.0	4,031	26.5	40.9	14.5	3.8	4.1	5.5	1.7	2.0	0.9	1,456	2,537	36.1	62.9	1,081
Simrishamn	85.4	6.5	13,238	25.5	27.6	18.4	5.0	5.8	5.3	6.2	4.5	1.6	5,631	7,398	42.5	55.9	1,767
Tomelilla	85.4	4.3	8,750	23.3	37.2	17.0	4.0	5.8	5.5	3.5	2.6	1.2	3,198	5,445	36.5	62.2	2,247
Åstorp	79.4	4.3	8,704	28.2	38.1	16.7	3.9	3.3	5.0	1.4	2.1	1.3	3,207	5,387	36.8	61.9	2,180
Ängelholm	85.9	14.3	28,920	25.8	28.0	22.9	3.1	5.8	6.3	3.4	3.9	1.0	10,973	17,650	37.9	61.0	6,677
Örkelljunga	83.7	3.1	6,331	21.6	39.3	14.2	2.5	4.4	11.2	2.2	2.5	2.1	1,945	4,254	30.7	67.2	2,309
Östra Göinge	84.0	4.3	8,799	25.5	38.1	17.4	3.2	4.4	6.1	2.0	2.2	1.2	3,086	5,610	35.1	63.8	2,524
Total	83.9	100.0	202,890	25.2	32.2	19.5	3.9	4.9	6.2	3.0	3.8	1.3	75,187	125,045	37.1	61.6	49,858
Source: Sweden's Election Authority

==== Skåne S ====
Location	Turnout	Share	Votes	S	SD	M	V	C	KD	MP	L	Other	L-vote	R-vote	Left	Right	Margin
Location	%	%		%	%	%	%	%	%	%	%	%			%	%	
Burlöv	74.5	3.8	9,947	32.6	24.2	17.6	7.2	4.9	3.3	3.8	3.6	2.7	4,821	4,855	48.5	48.8	34
Kävlinge	89.8	8.1	21,029	25.1	26.8	24.5	2.5	6.9	4.6	3.4	5.2	0.8	7,984	12,869	38.0	61.2	4,885
Lomma	92.4	6.4	16,493	23.2	17.6	29.4	2.2	8.5	4.8	4.6	8.9	0.8	6,341	10,028	38.4	60.8	3,687
Lund	87.7	31.4	81,313	28.3	12.8	16.8	9.1	8.7	3.4	11.0	8.4	1.4	46,470	33,666	57.1	41.4	12,804
Sjöbo	85.5	4.9	12,612	19.1	42.6	17.7	2.7	4.3	6.9	2.7	2.9	1.1	3,634	8,837	28.8	70.1	5,203
Skurup	86.2	4.0	10,464	24.1	34.9	20.1	3.8	5.1	5.0	2.4	3.3	1.3	3,697	6,629	35.3	63.4	2,932
Staffanstorp	88.6	6.4	16,559	26.3	23.2	26.9	3.2	6.2	4.5	3.5	5.4	0.9	6,478	9,935	39.1	60.0	3,457
Svedala	89.3	5.7	14,670	24.8	32.7	22.0	3.0	4.9	5.4	2.8	3.5	0.9	5,205	9,329	35.5	63.6	4,124
Trelleborg	83.8	11.1	28,726	26.9	32.0	20.0	3.6	4.5	5.6	2.3	3.8	1.3	10,717	17,633	37.3	61.4	6,916
Vellinge	91.6	10.1	26,093	14.8	25.3	35.7	1.2	6.1	6.3	2.2	7.6	0.7	6,362	19,553	24.4	74.9	13,191
Ystad	86.1	8.3	21,427	27.3	27.0	22.0	3.6	4.9	6.0	3.6	4.6	1.1	8,452	12,745	39.4	59.5	4,293
Total	87.3	100.0	259,333	25.4	23.4	22.1	5.0	6.6	4.8	5.5	6.2	1.2	110,161	146,079	42.5	56.3	35,918
Source: Sweden's Election Authority

==== Skåne W ====
Location	Turnout	Share	Votes	S	SD	M	V	C	KD	MP	L	Other	L-vote	R-vote	Left	Right	Margin
Location	%	%		%	%	%	%	%	%	%	%	%			%	%	
Bjuv	79.9	4.5	8,661	27.1	42.1	15.1	3.7	2.9	4.1	1.4	1.8	1.9	3,039	5,459	35.1	63.0	2,420
Eslöv	83.8	10.8	20,683	28.3	30.7	17.7	4.7	5.1	4.7	3.6	3.6	1.6	8,629	11,723	41.7	56.7	3,094
Helsingborg	80.1	45.7	87,626	28.1	26.3	21.6	5.0	5.0	4.5	3.4	4.4	1.7	36,358	49,768	41.5	56.8	13,410
Höganäs	87.8	9.7	18,548	24.3	23.6	25.1	3.1	6.6	5.7	4.5	5.9	1.2	7,141	11,190	38.5	60.3	4,049
Hörby	85.4	5.3	10,094	21.1	39.0	16.3	3.7	5.6	6.9	2.8	3.7	1.0	3,353	6,640	33.2	65.8	3,287
Höör	86.2	5.7	10,904	23.1	30.6	17.6	5.2	5.3	6.0	6.2	4.3	1.6	4,345	6,383	39.8	58.5	2,038
Landskrona	79.5	13.9	26,654	31.1	27.4	17.3	4.8	3.8	3.6	3.1	6.1	2.8	11,391	14,511	42.7	54.4	3,120
Svalöv	84.8	4.4	8,485	24.7	36.7	14.5	4.5	5.8	5.3	3.7	3.1	1.7	3,281	5,059	38.7	59.6	1,778
Total	81.9	100.0	191,655	27.3	28.8	19.8	4.6	5.0	4.7	3.5	4.5	1.8	77,537	110,733	40.7	57.8	33,196
Source: Sweden's Election Authority

=== Stockholm area ===
==== Stockholm ====
Location	Turnout	Share	Votes	S	SD	M	V	C	KD	MP	L	Other	L-vote	R-vote	Left	Right	Margin
Location	%	%		%	%	%	%	%	%	%	%	%			%	%	
Northeast	88.5	18.3	110,928	18.9	10.6	31.4	4.7	10.7	4.6	6.9	11.2	1.1	45,775	63,977	41.3	57.7	18,202
Northwest	71.7	12.7	76,777	31.9	11.9	15.6	15.7	6.2	3.4	5.6	4.1	5.5	45,640	26,889	59.4	35.0	18,751
South	88.7	19.8	119,937	30.6	9.2	14.4	12.8	8.7	2.3	14.5	6.2	1.1	79,969	38,600	66.7	32.2	41,369
Southeast	81.8	15.6	94,870	32.4	12.1	11.7	17.7	5.9	2.4	12.0	3.9	1.9	64,519	28,563	68.0	30.1	35,956
Southwest	83.0	16.3	98,844	31.9	10.5	14.5	15.1	7.2	2.6	11.3	4.9	1.9	64,727	32,222	65.5	32.6	32,505
West	88.5	17.4	105,395	24.4	10.4	24.8	6.5	11.0	3.8	8.5	9.5	1.2	53,077	51,075	50.4	48.5	2,002
Total	84.0	100.0	606,751	28.1	10.7	19.1	11.7	8.5	3.2	10.0	6.9	1.9	353,707	241,326	58.3	39.9	112,381
Source: Sweden's Election Authority

==== Stockholm County ====
Location	Turnout	Share	Votes	S	SD	M	V	C	KD	MP	L	Other	L-vote	R-vote	Left	Right	Margin
Location	%	%		%	%	%	%	%	%	%	%	%			%	%	
Botkyrka	71.3	5.3	43,262	32.3	18.5	17.3	10.3	4.7	6.6	3.9	3.1	3.4	22,152	19,656	51.2	45.4	2,496
Danderyd	89.7	2.6	21,658	12.5	11.1	41.0	2.1	10.0	5.9	4.2	12.3	0.9	6,235	15,229	28.8	70.3	8,994
Ekerö	90.4	2.2	18,186	23.0	19.3	25.6	3.8	9.1	5.7	6.1	6.3	1.1	7,647	10,341	42.0	56.9	2,694
Haninge	79.0	6.1	50,489	29.8	22.8	20.8	7.3	5.4	4.2	3.7	3.9	2.2	23,313	26,080	46.2	51.7	2,767
Huddinge	80.8	7.4	60,933	30.0	17.0	21.4	8.4	6.9	3.8	5.6	4.7	2.1	31,027	28,604	50.9	46.9	2,423
Järfälla	79.4	5.5	45,409	30.7	16.4	21.0	9.1	6.1	4.3	4.8	5.1	2.4	23,038	21,271	50.7	46.8	1,767
Lidingö	87.7	3.8	31,247	17.8	12.1	34.2	3.1	10.4	5.2	5.5	10.7	1.0	11,488	19,433	36.8	62.2	7,945
Nacka	87.3	8.2	67,081	25.3	11.8	26.9	5.3	10.4	4.0	7.4	7.6	1.3	32,459	33,766	48.4	50.3	1,307
Norrtälje	85.0	5.2	42,903	29.1	25.2	20.6	4.6	6.3	4.7	4.0	4.2	1.1	18,914	23,498	44.1	54.8	4,584
Nykvarn	88.9	0.9	7,276	24.9	28.7	25.6	2.5	5.3	5.3	2.6	4.4	0.7	2,566	4,660	35.3	64.0	2,094
Nynäshamn	83.1	2.1	17,676	31.4	27.3	17.7	5.2	4.5	5.1	4.0	3.4	1.4	7,984	9,444	45.2	53.4	1,460
Salem	85.0	1.2	10,070	27.9	19.6	23.8	4.8	6.7	5.7	5.0	5.1	1.5	4,464	5,454	44.3	54.2	990
Sigtuna	77.4	3.1	25,280	27.6	22.3	22.3	6.3	5.3	5.9	3.4	4.1	2.9	10,749	13,805	42.5	54.6	3,056
Sollentuna	84.7	5.4	44,031	26.8	12.9	24.9	6.2	9.4	4.5	5.8	7.7	1.7	21,261	22,031	48.3	50.0	770
Solna	83.8	6.1	50,061	29.5	12.5	21.2	8.9	8.6	3.8	6.9	6.8	1.7	26,997	22,213	53.9	44.4	4,784
Sundbyberg	81.2	3.7	30,744	31.3	12.7	20.0	10.9	7.5	3.5	6.3	5.9	1.7	17,239	12,989	56.1	42.2	4,250
Södertälje	70.6	5.7	46,786	28.5	20.9	20.6	7.0	4.5	8.2	4.8	3.6	1.8	21,000	24,964	44.9	53.4	3,964
Tyresö	86.9	3.7	30,322	29.8	18.9	23.6	5.1	6.6	3.9	5.3	5.5	1.2	14,204	15,751	46.8	51.9	1,547
Täby	88.6	5.8	47,733	19.8	12.9	33.9	2.8	9.9	5.2	4.6	9.7	1.1	17,712	29,518	37.1	61.8	11,806
Upplands-Bro	81.3	2.0	16,471	28.2	22.8	21.4	7.0	5.3	5.5	3.4	4.4	1.9	7,237	8,914	43.9	54.1	1,677
Upplands Väsby	79.5	3.1	25,908	30.1	20.9	20.5	7.6	5.9	5.0	3.6	4.3	1.9	12,249	13,156	47.3	50.8	907
Vallentuna	81.7	2.6	21,293	24.1	20.7	26.0	3.7	7.9	5.2	5.2	6.0	1.2	8,714	12,324	40.9	57.9	3,610
Vaxholm	89.7	1.0	8,110	22.4	15.6	28.7	2.9	10.1	5.2	6.3	7.9	0.9	3,375	4,659	41.6	57.4	1,284
Värmdö	88.4	3.6	29,584	26.5	19.8	23.7	4.7	8.0	4.5	6.4	5.4	1.1	13,473	15,792	45.5	53.4	2,319
Österåker	87.3	3.6	29,997	24.9	19.4	27.5	3.7	7.5	4.7	4.7	6.4	1.2	12,242	17,385	40.8	58.0	5,143
Total	82.5	100.0	822,510	27.1	17.5	24.0	6.3	7.4	4.9	5.1	6.0	1.7	377,739	430,937	45.9	52.4	53,198
Source: Sweden's Election Authority

=== Södermanland ===
Location	Turnout	Share	Votes	S	SD	M	V	C	KD	MP	L	Other	L-vote	R-vote	Left	Right	Margin
Location	%	%		%	%	%	%	%	%	%	%	%			%	%	
Eskilstuna	80.4	33.7	62,313	33.0	24.2	18.5	5.9	5.1	4.7	3.5	3.6	1.5	29,617	31,789	47.5	51.0	2,172
Flen	82.6	5.3	9,837	34.8	24.9	15.3	5.1	6.3	5.1	4.1	3.1	1.3	4,954	4,759	50.4	48.4	195
Gnesta	86.4	4.0	7,360	29.1	22.2	19.4	6.9	7.6	4.3	6.2	2.9	1.4	3,659	3,595	49.7	48.8	64
Katrineholm	83.0	11.5	21,314	37.8	21.8	16.9	4.7	6.1	4.7	3.7	3.0	1.3	11,157	9,885	52.3	46.4	1,272
Nyköping	85.8	20.0	36,968	34.1	20.2	19.3	5.0	6.8	4.8	4.7	3.8	1.3	18,710	17,793	50.6	48.1	917
Oxelösund	83.1	4.0	7,484	39.1	22.5	17.0	6.9	3.7	3.4	2.9	2.6	2.1	3,929	3,397	52.5	45.4	532
Strängnäs	86.2	13.0	24,053	27.2	23.4	23.8	4.0	6.7	4.9	4.1	4.6	1.3	10,107	13,633	42.0	56.7	3,526
Trosa	88.5	5.2	9,650	27.3	23.3	24.5	3.4	6.5	5.0	4.7	4.1	1.1	4,049	5,499	42.0	57.0	1,450
Vingåker	86.8	3.2	5,901	33.1	28.8	16.8	4.5	5.0	5.2	3.3	2.1	1.1	2,712	3,125	46.0	53.0	413
Total	83.5	100.0	184,880	32.9	23.0	19.2	5.2	5.9	4.7	4.0	3.6	1.4	88,894	93,475	48.1	50.5	4,581
Source: Sweden's Election Authority

=== Uppsala ===
Location	Turnout	Share	Votes	S	SD	M	V	C	KD	MP	L	Other	L-vote	R-vote	Left	Right	Margin
Location	%	%		%	%	%	%	%	%	%	%	%			%	%	
Enköping	84.4	11.7	29,193	27.9	24.7	21.7	4.2	6.7	6.4	3.4	3.6	1.5	12,310	16,454	42.2	56.4	4,144
Heby	85.1	3.7	9,149	27.6	29.6	14.8	4.9	7.9	8.2	2.9	2.4	1.6	3,966	5,036	43.3	55.0	1,070
Håbo	86.5	5.6	13,992	24.5	28.4	23.8	3.8	5.2	6.0	2.8	4.4	1.1	5,088	8,744	36.4	62.5	3,656
Knivsta	89.2	4.8	12,065	25.0	19.5	21.1	4.7	7.8	8.5	6.2	5.6	1.6	5,269	6,605	43.7	54.7	1,336
Tierp	85.3	5.5	13,600	34.1	26.6	14.4	4.7	7.1	5.9	3.3	2.6	1.3	6,697	6,729	49.2	49.5	32
Uppsala	86.3	60.3	150,144	29.4	13.0	17.6	10.2	7.8	5.4	8.9	5.9	1.9	84,507	62,842	56.3	41.9	21,665
Älvkarleby	84.2	2.4	6,088	35.5	31.0	14.5	4.6	3.3	4.3	2.9	2.4	1.4	2,824	3,180	46.4	52.2	356
Östhammar	85.0	5.9	14,657	30.4	27.0	18.5	3.7	5.4	8.0	2.6	3.3	1.0	6,171	8,335	42.1	56.9	2,164
Total	86.0	100.0	248,888	29.1	18.2	18.3	7.9	7.2	5.9	6.7	5.0	1.7	126,832	117,925	51.0	47.4	8,907
Source: Sweden's Election Authority

=== Värmland ===
Location	Turnout	Share	Votes	S	SD	M	V	C	KD	MP	L	Other	L-vote	R-vote	Left	Right	Margin
Location	%	%		%	%	%	%	%	%	%	%	%			%	%	
Arvika	84.6	9.1	16,593	34.9	23.3	16.9	5.4	6.0	5.5	4.2	2.9	0.9	8,381	8,067	50.5	48.6	314
Eda	80.4	2.4	4,320	33.4	29.9	14.1	3.0	6.2	9.1	1.4	2.1	0.8	1,898	2,386	43.9	55.2	488
Filipstad	80.4	3.4	6,132	36.7	30.4	14.5	5.1	3.1	4.9	1.6	2.4	1.2	2,852	3,207	46.5	52.3	355
Forshaga	86.9	4.2	7,582	37.7	26.7	14.2	4.2	5.0	5.9	2.8	2.3	1.1	3,772	3,727	49.7	49.2	45
Grums	84.1	3.2	5,749	37.9	29.4	14.3	4.3	5.1	4.4	1.8	1.8	1.0	2,824	2,866	49.1	49.9	42
Hagfors	82.5	4.0	7,210	43.2	27.6	9.4	5.5	4.3	5.0	1.8	2.1	1.2	3,943	3,183	54.7	44.1	760
Hammarö	90.4	6.1	11,052	37.2	16.1	20.2	3.4	6.9	5.2	4.4	5.4	0.9	5,727	5,222	51.8	47.2	505
Karlstad	85.8	34.8	63,445	34.8	17.3	19.5	6.2	6.5	4.8	5.1	4.7	1.1	33,336	29,409	52.5	46.4	3,927
Kil	87.6	4.4	8,044	32.4	27.8	16.5	3.8	6.5	5.5	3.4	3.4	0.7	3,709	4,279	46.1	53.2	570
Kristinehamn	84.9	8.7	15,890	36.3	23.2	14.9	5.7	5.9	5.0	3.2	4.6	1.0	8,143	7,581	51.2	47.7	562
Munkfors	84.0	1.2	2,250	44.0	24.9	10.3	5.1	5.6	4.4	2.1	2.4	1.2	1,278	946	56.8	42.0	332
Storfors	85.1	1.4	2,597	36.1	30.9	14.1	4.3	4.6	4.4	2.1	2.0	1.5	1,224	1,333	47.1	51.3	109
Sunne	86.1	4.8	8,797	28.1	24.4	19.6	3.4	9.5	7.3	3.1	3.5	1.1	3,874	4,825	44.0	54.8	951
Säffle	84.8	5.4	9,786	28.0	29.3	16.7	3.6	9.1	7.5	2.1	2.7	1.0	4,182	5,503	42.7	56.2	1,321
Torsby	83.2	3.9	7,177	32.8	28.9	16.2	4.2	5.9	6.4	2.1	2.3	1.2	3,225	3,868	44.9	53.9	643
Årjäng	82.4	3.1	5,607	23.9	30.6	12.6	2.5	7.0	17.8	2.0	2.8	0.8	1,984	3,577	35.4	63.8	1,593
Total	85.2	100.0	182,231	34.6	22.8	17.0	5.0	6.3	5.8	3.6	3.7	1.0	90,352	89,979	49.6	49.4	373
Source: Sweden's Election Authority

=== Västerbotten ===
Location	Turnout	Share	Votes	S	SD	M	V	C	KD	MP	L	Other	L-vote	R-vote	Left	Right	Margin
Location	%	%		%	%	%	%	%	%	%	%	%			%	%	
Bjurholm	82.9	0.8	1,500	29.8	24.3	20.1	2.8	8.1	9.1	1.9	3.0	0.9	639	847	42.6	56.5	208
Dorotea	80.8	0.9	1,523	42.1	23.0	6.8	8.6	7.6	5.1	1.7	3.8	1.2	914	591	60.0	38.8	323
Lycksele	83.0	4.3	7,555	40.4	18.2	14.7	5.3	5.2	10.3	2.2	2.9	0.8	4,017	3,477	53.2	46.0	540
Malå	82.0	1.0	1,807	40.1	24.4	9.5	9.0	4.4	5.8	1.4	4.8	0.7	992	803	54.9	44.4	189
Nordmaling	84.4	2.6	4,605	37.4	21.6	13.6	5.7	9.3	6.1	2.6	2.6	1.0	2,531	2,026	55.0	44.0	505
Norsjö	83.1	1.4	2,504	41.3	18.4	13.4	6.4	6.1	8.5	1.2	3.6	1.0	1,377	1,101	55.0	44.0	276
Robertsfors	84.3	2.4	4,302	39.6	15.4	13.2	6.3	12.9	5.1	4.3	2.1	1.2	2,715	1,537	63.1	35.7	1,178
Skellefteå	85.4	27.0	47,884	45.2	15.3	13.3	6.6	7.4	4.4	4.0	2.6	1.0	30,272	17,113	63.2	35.7	13,159
Sorsele	81.3	0.8	1,457	39.2	21.8	11.4	7.3	7.8	7.1	2.3	2.2	1.0	824	618	56.7	42.4	206
Storuman	81.6	2.0	3,624	34.4	23.1	13.1	7.1	6.4	7.9	3.2	3.9	0.8	1,854	1,740	51.2	48.0	114
Umeå	87.5	48.4	85,994	39.8	10.8	14.9	10.6	7.9	3.6	7.6	3.6	1.1	56,699	28,327	65.9	32.9	28,372
Vilhelmina	81.7	2.3	4,080	35.2	25.8	10.5	7.8	6.5	8.9	2.0	1.4	1.7	2,105	1,904	51.6	46.7	201
Vindeln	83.8	1.9	3,389	34.0	21.7	16.6	5.3	9.6	6.3	2.9	2.5	1.1	1,754	1,597	51.8	47.1	157
Vännäs	84.3	3.2	5,594	36.6	18.4	15.0	8.0	9.1	4.9	4.5	2.2	1.4	3,255	2,263	58.2	40.5	992
Åsele	82.0	1.0	1,725	37.7	22.4	12.9	5.4	10.0	5.3	1.7	3.2	1.3	947	755	54.9	43.8	192
Total	85.8	100.0	177,543	40.7	14.5	14.1	8.5	7.8	4.7	5.4	3.1	1.1	110,895	64,699	62.5	36.4	46,196
Source: Sweden's Election Authority

=== Västernorrland ===
Location	Turnout	Share	Votes	S	SD	M	V	C	KD	MP	L	Other	L-vote	R-vote	Left	Right	Margin
Location	%	%		%	%	%	%	%	%	%	%	%			%	%	
Härnösand	84.4	10.0	15,950	39.6	19.7	12.3	6.4	7.6	4.7	6.0	2.6	1.2	9,502	6,252	59.6	39.2	3,250
Kramfors	83.7	7.3	11,550	41.6	21.9	9.5	7.9	8.3	4.6	3.1	1.6	1.4	7,043	4,346	61.0	37.6	2,697
Sollefteå	84.0	7.5	11,979	39.1	25.1	7.4	8.3	8.8	6.0	2.3	1.5	1.5	7,009	4,794	58.5	40.0	2,215
Sundsvall	85.4	40.8	64,770	37.8	20.0	16.7	5.7	6.4	5.0	3.8	3.6	1.1	34,735	29,349	53.6	45.3	5,386
Timrå	85.5	7.4	11,810	41.0	26.3	12.6	5.1	5.0	4.9	2.1	2.2	0.9	6,282	5,426	53.2	45.9	856
Ånge	84.5	3.8	6,090	37.2	29.8	12.3	4.8	5.5	6.0	1.5	1.7	1.1	2,983	3,040	49.0	49.9	57
Örnsköldsvik	85.9	23.0	36,572	41.5	17.1	14.2	4.5	9.7	6.7	2.9	2.3	1.2	21,390	14,737	58.5	40.3	6,653
Total	85.2	100.0	158,721	39.4	20.7	14.0	5.7	7.4	5.4	3.4	2.7	1.2	88,944	67,944	56.0	42.8	21,000
Source: Sweden's Election Authority

=== Västmanland ===
Location	Turnout	Share	Votes	S	SD	M	V	C	KD	MP	L	Other	L-vote	R-vote	Left	Right	Margin
Location	%	%		%	%	%	%	%	%	%	%	%			%	%	
Arboga	84.0	5.3	9,081	33.8	25.6	17.6	4.8	5.2	4.8	3.5	3.6	1.1	4,296	4,682	47.3	51.6	386
Fagersta	80.8	4.5	7,634	35.6	27.9	14.8	7.7	3.3	4.8	2.4	2.5	1.1	3,740	3,811	49.0	49.9	71
Hallstahammar	83.2	5.9	10,125	34.9	28.2	14.8	5.9	4.3	4.9	2.6	2.9	1.6	4,833	5,135	47.7	50.7	302
Kungsör	84.9	3.2	5,456	32.0	29.0	16.2	4.5	5.2	6.0	2.5	3.7	1.1	2,408	2,989	44.1	54.8	581
Köping	82.4	9.3	15,956	32.5	29.2	14.7	6.3	4.9	6.4	2.2	2.8	1.1	7,332	8,452	46.0	53.0	1,120
Norberg	83.6	2.1	3,587	36.9	25.8	14.3	7.7	3.0	4.6	2.9	3.1	1.7	1,811	1,714	50.5	47.8	97
Sala	85.8	8.7	14,805	30.5	27.2	16.8	5.3	7.3	5.6	3.0	3.0	1.4	6,823	7,781	46.1	52.6	958
Skinnskatteberg	83.2	1.6	2,787	34.4	31.4	11.6	5.2	4.1	5.3	2.8	4.2	1.0	1,294	1,464	46.4	52.5	170
Surahammar	83.7	3.6	6,185	34.7	33.7	13.9	5.0	2.7	4.4	1.9	2.5	1.0	2,749	3,374	44.4	54.6	625
Västerås	82.5	55.7	95,133	31.0	19.9	22.1	6.4	5.8	4.7	3.6	5.1	1.3	44,523	49,338	46.8	51.9	4,815
Total	82.9	100.0	170,749	32.0	23.7	19.1	6.1	5.4	5.0	3.2	4.2	1.3	79,809	88,740	46.7	52.0	8,931
Source: Sweden's Election Authority

=== Västra Götaland ===
==== Gothenburg ====
Location	Turnout	Share	Votes	S	SD	M	V	C	KD	MP	L	Other	L-vote	R-vote	Left	Right	Margin
Location	%	%		%	%	%	%	%	%	%	%	%			%	%	
Gothenburg	80.7	100.0	347,101	27.7	14.7	18.5	12.8	5.9	4.4	7.9	5.9	2.3	188,410	150,533	54.3	43.4	37,877
Total	80.7	100.0	347,101	27.7	14.7	18.5	12.8	5.9	4.4	7.9	5.9	2.3	188,410	150,533	54.3	43.4	37,877
Source: Sweden's Election Authority

==== Västra Götaland E ====
The Social Democrats became the largest party in Töreboda Municipality by four votes over the Sweden Democrats, although by a close enough margin for both to be rounded to 29.9% using one decimal.

Location	Turnout	Share	Votes	S	SD	M	V	C	KD	MP	L	Other	L-vote	R-vote	Left	Right	Margin
Location	%	%		%	%	%	%	%	%	%	%	%			%	%	
Essunga	87.4	2.1	3,788	27.0	29.9	20.2	3.5	8.2	5.9	2.5	1.9	0.9	1,557	2,196	41.1	58.0	639
Falköping	85.1	11.9	20,933	29.7	25.1	17.3	4.9	7.1	7.6	3.5	3.2	1.6	9,460	11,143	45.2	53.2	1,683
Grästorp	88.3	2.2	3,943	24.9	29.4	20.2	2.6	9.3	6.8	2.4	3.2	1.2	1,546	2,348	39.2	59.5	802
Gullspång	83.4	1.9	3,299	34.5	29.4	14.2	4.6	5.9	5.0	2.2	2.2	1.8	1,561	1,678	47.3	50.9	117
Götene	88.1	5.1	8,951	32.2	23.4	16.1	4.4	7.5	8.1	3.9	3.2	1.2	4,300	4,544	48.0	50.8	244
Hjo	87.7	3.5	6,262	29.5	22.6	18.7	4.0	6.6	9.5	4.4	3.5	1.2	2,792	3,392	44.6	54.2	600
Karlsborg	89.1	2.8	4,882	30.4	26.7	16.7	3.5	6.9	8.3	2.5	4.1	0.9	2,113	2,724	43.3	55.8	611
Lidköping	87.8	15.5	27,366	34.1	21.4	17.6	5.0	6.4	6.6	3.9	3.9	1.2	13,493	13,550	49.3	49.5	57
Mariestad	86.3	9.3	16,463	34.2	22.9	20.3	4.6	5.5	5.8	3.2	2.4	1.1	7,806	8,472	47.4	51.5	666
Skara	84.9	6.7	11,904	31.7	24.5	18.8	4.6	6.5	6.0	3.5	3.2	1.2	5,521	6,239	46.4	52.4	718
Skövde	85.2	20.8	36,748	31.2	20.8	20.9	4.7	6.5	7.0	3.6	4.0	1.4	16,906	19,330	46.0	52.6	2,424
Tibro	84.5	4.1	7,223	31.7	25.6	16.3	3.7	6.3	8.6	2.4	4.3	1.2	3,179	3,954	44.0	54.7	775
Tidaholm	87.2	4.8	8,559	35.1	27.6	13.7	4.0	5.3	7.6	2.6	3.1	1.1	4,015	4,451	46.9	52.0	436
Töreboda	84.7	3.3	5,876	29.9	29.9	17.3	3.9	6.5	5.7	2.2	2.4	2.2	2,502	3,246	42.6	55.2	744
Vara	85.6	5.9	10,329	25.0	29.9	22.0	3.8	7.5	6.4	1.8	2.6	0.8	3,941	6,303	38.2	61.0	2,362
Total	86.1	100.0	176,526	31.4	24.1	18.6	4.5	6.6	7.0	3.3	3.4	1.3	80,692	93,570	45.7	53.0	12,878
Source: Sweden's Election Authority

==== Västra Götaland N ====
Location	Turnout	Share	Votes	S	SD	M	V	C	KD	MP	L	Other	L-vote	R-vote	Left	Right	Margin
Location	%	%		%	%	%	%	%	%	%	%	%			%	%	
Bengtsfors	83.5	3.4	5,840	32.6	29.7	14.3	4.5	5.9	6.5	3.3	2.4	0.8	2,702	3,089	46.3	52.9	387
Dals-Ed	83.2	1.7	2,875	23.2	31.7	16.7	3.0	8.6	10.9	1.6	2.5	1.8	1,047	1,776	36.4	61.8	729
Färgelanda	82.5	2.5	4,256	26.7	38.2	13.0	3.1	6.8	6.6	1.7	2.7	1.2	1,631	2,575	38.3	60.5	944
Lysekil	86.0	5.5	9,629	33.5	25.2	16.3	5.0	4.6	5.2	4.4	4.4	1.5	4,569	4,920	47.5	51.1	351
Mellerud	84.4	3.3	5,766	26.0	32.4	17.2	3.4	7.4	6.8	2.7	2.3	1.8	2,276	3,384	39.5	58.7	1,108
Munkedal	83.8	3.8	6,630	27.4	32.0	15.7	4.4	6.1	8.0	2.4	2.5	1.5	2,674	3,856	40.3	58.2	1,182
Orust	87.9	6.3	10,860	28.3	25.7	17.9	4.7	6.5	6.5	4.9	4.3	1.3	4,807	5,917	44.3	54.5	1,110
Sotenäs	88.3	3.8	6,668	28.0	24.2	22.0	3.0	5.6	7.6	3.2	5.5	0.9	2,652	3,954	39.8	59.3	1,302
Strömstad	80.9	4.2	7,256	29.1	25.6	17.3	4.9	5.8	6.5	4.5	4.8	1.5	3,213	3,934	44.3	54.2	721
Tanum	86.4	5.0	8,759	24.4	24.1	21.6	4.1	8.4	7.4	4.5	4.4	1.1	3,624	5,039	41.4	57.5	1,415
Trollhättan	83.0	20.8	36,047	35.7	20.8	19.0	6.1	5.4	4.8	3.5	3.4	1.3	18,277	17,288	50.7	48.0	989
Uddevalla	84.0	20.6	35,755	31.0	24.6	17.5	5.7	5.1	6.5	4.0	3.6	2.0	16,333	18,702	45.7	52.3	2,369
Vänersborg	85.2	14.6	25,419	32.8	25.9	15.9	5.6	5.6	5.8	3.4	3.7	1.2	12,058	13,050	47.4	51.3	992
Åmål	83.2	4.5	7,895	33.0	28.2	15.7	5.2	5.0	5.7	3.1	2.9	1.2	3,657	4,146	46.3	52.5	489
Total	84.4	100.0	173,655	31.3	25.4	17.5	5.2	5.7	6.2	3.6	3.6	1.5	79,520	91,630	45.8	52.8	12,110
Source: Sweden's Election Authority

==== Västra Götaland S ====
Location	Turnout	Share	Votes	S	SD	M	V	C	KD	MP	L	Other	L-vote	R-vote	Left	Right	Margin
Location	%	%		%	%	%	%	%	%	%	%	%			%	%	
Bollebygd	89.1	4.5	6,356	25.6	27.7	20.1	4.3	6.5	6.6	3.9	4.1	1.2	2,559	3,719	40.3	58.5	1,160
Borås	82.4	48.1	68,283	30.4	21.5	20.1	6.1	5.9	6.3	3.8	4.2	1.7	31,527	35,599	46.2	52.1	4,072
Herrljunga	87.4	4.4	6,302	26.0	26.4	16.3	4.7	9.1	9.4	2.7	3.7	1.7	2,678	3,518	42.5	55.8	840
Mark	85.9	15.9	22,632	30.5	24.9	16.5	5.4	7.6	6.9	3.4	3.2	1.7	10,607	11,639	46.9	51.4	1,032
Svenljunga	84.6	4.8	6,768	25.4	31.7	17.6	3.7	6.7	7.9	2.7	3.1	1.1	2,610	4,081	38.6	60.3	1,471
Tranemo	85.9	5.4	7,607	30.0	24.3	19.1	4.1	8.7	6.5	3.0	2.9	1.4	3,483	4,018	45.8	52.8	535
Ulricehamn	86.3	11.4	16,163	27.0	23.9	19.8	4.4	9.0	7.1	3.5	4.0	1.2	7,097	8,865	43.9	54.8	1,768
Vårgårda	87.5	5.5	7,795	26.8	24.6	15.4	4.3	9.6	10.4	4.1	3.5	1.4	3,488	4,200	44.7	53.9	712
Total	84.4	100.0	141,906	29.1	23.6	18.9	5.3	7.1	7.0	3.6	3.8	1.6	64,049	75,639	45.1	53.3	11,590
Source: Sweden's Election Authority

==== Västra Götaland W ====
Location	Turnout	Share	Votes	S	SD	M	V	C	KD	MP	L	Other	L-vote	R-vote	Left	Right	Margin
Location	%	%		%	%	%	%	%	%	%	%	%			%	%	
Ale	85.1	7.9	19,517	29.9	25.7	18.3	6.7	5.3	5.6	3.6	3.3	1.7	8,858	10,331	45.4	52.9	1,473
Alingsås	87.9	11.2	27,734	29.8	19.1	18.0	6.5	7.0	7.3	5.8	5.1	1.5	13,604	13,713	49.1	49.4	109
Härryda	88.9	10.1	24,947	27.2	20.6	22.5	4.7	7.1	5.0	5.6	6.2	1.1	11,120	13,560	44.6	54.4	2,440
Kungälv	88.5	13.0	32,340	28.1	22.8	20.5	4.9	6.3	6.5	4.3	5.1	1.5	14,109	17,750	43.6	54.9	3,641
Lerum	89.8	11.2	27,881	26.9	19.7	21.9	5.4	6.5	6.0	6.3	6.3	1.0	12,568	15,045	45.1	54.0	2,477
Lilla Edet	83.0	3.5	8,684	28.8	35.3	13.3	5.7	4.9	5.4	2.3	2.5	1.8	3,620	4,907	41.7	56.5	1,287
Mölndal	86.7	17.9	44,287	28.2	17.7	21.2	7.0	7.2	4.9	6.2	6.4	1.4	21,479	22,197	48.5	50.1	718
Partille	85.1	9.6	23,845	28.6	17.8	21.7	6.5	6.8	5.4	6.2	5.9	1.2	11,469	12,099	48.1	50.7	630
Stenungsund	88.3	7.3	18,154	27.8	23.8	22.1	4.2	5.8	6.0	4.0	4.9	1.4	7,584	10,307	41.8	56.8	2,723
Tjörn	89.4	4.6	11,328	25.4	24.3	19.9	3.7	5.5	9.9	4.0	6.4	0.9	4,372	6,854	38.6	60.5	2,482
Öckerö	90.8	3.7	9,146	24.8	22.1	19.8	4.2	4.8	14.1	4.5	4.5	1.1	3,501	5,540	38.3	60.6	2,039
Total	87.6	100.0	247,863	28.0	21.2	20.5	5.7	6.4	6.3	5.2	5.4	1.3	112,284	132,303	45.3	53.4	20,019
Source: Sweden's Election Authority

=== Örebro ===
Location	Turnout	Share	Votes	S	SD	M	V	C	KD	MP	L	Other	L-vote	R-vote	Left	Right	Margin
Location	%	%		%	%	%	%	%	%	%	%	%			%	%	
Askersund	86.5	4.0	7,817	32.0	29.6	15.6	3.4	6.5	5.6	3.0	2.8	1.5	3,502	4,197	44.8	53.7	695
Degerfors	84.9	3.2	6,261	39.6	26.6	12.0	7.7	3.9	4.2	2.4	2.3	1.3	3,359	2,819	53.6	45.0	540
Hallsberg	85.6	5.2	10,073	35.5	27.2	14.7	4.8	6.1	4.6	2.9	2.9	1.3	4,964	4,981	49.3	49.4	17
Hällefors	81.6	2.1	4,016	38.3	29.5	13.0	5.9	4.2	3.1	2.6	2.1	1.2	2,050	1,919	51.0	47.8	131
Karlskoga	84.3	10.1	19,604	37.4	23.7	18.9	5.0	4.1	3.9	2.6	3.0	1.3	9,634	9,722	49.1	49.6	88
Kumla	86.9	7.3	14,141	33.2	25.6	17.3	4.3	5.6	5.6	2.6	4.7	1.2	6,451	7,520	45.6	53.2	1,069
Laxå	85.3	1.9	3,633	34.5	30.7	12.2	4.8	5.1	6.2	2.1	2.9	1.4	1,689	1,892	46.5	52.1	203
Lekeberg	89.3	2.9	5,598	25.3	27.5	17.2	3.6	9.5	8.1	3.4	3.8	1.6	2,340	3,167	41.8	56.6	827
Lindesberg	84.5	7.8	15,053	30.2	30.1	15.5	5.1	6.0	5.4	3.2	2.7	1.8	6,701	8,087	44.5	53.7	1,386
Ljusnarsberg	81.0	1.5	2,845	32.8	34.9	13.7	5.4	3.0	4.1	1.9	1.8	2.3	1,230	1,550	43.2	54.5	320
Nora	86.1	3.6	7,031	32.9	25.8	15.0	4.7	6.0	5.6	4.4	3.7	1.8	3,378	3,523	48.0	50.1	145
Örebro	84.1	50.5	98,115	32.6	17.1	17.5	7.3	7.0	5.6	5.2	5.9	1.8	51,165	45,231	52.1	46.1	5,934
Total	84.7	100.0	194,187	33.2	22.1	16.7	6.1	6.3	5.3	4.1	4.5	1.6	96,463	94,608	49.7	48.7	1,855
Source: Sweden's Election Authority

=== Östergötland ===
Location	Turnout	Share	Votes	S	SD	M	V	C	KD	MP	L	Other	L-vote	R-vote	Left	Right	Margin
Location	%	%		%	%	%	%	%	%	%	%	%			%	%	
Boxholm	88.0	1.2	3,749	35.9	26.6	14.9	4.1	5.9	6.0	2.6	2.5	1.4	1,821	1,876	48.6	50.0	55
Finspång	85.3	4.7	13,999	35.5	26.1	15.2	5.4	4.8	5.5	2.9	3.2	1.5	6,791	7,002	48.5	50.0	211
Kinda	88.1	2.3	6,778	29.7	25.3	16.5	3.9	8.0	8.2	4.5	2.5	1.5	3,123	3,553	46.1	52.4	430
Linköping	86.2	35.4	106,264	30.1	15.9	20.9	6.0	8.1	5.3	6.3	6.0	1.4	53,624	51,100	50.5	48.1	2,524
Mjölby	86.8	6.1	18,378	31.8	24.5	20.2	4.0	5.7	6.1	2.8	4.0	1.0	8,145	10,057	44.3	54.7	1,912
Motala	85.3	9.3	28,104	34.2	24.9	18.7	4.4	5.1	5.5	2.7	3.5	1.0	13,051	14,783	46.4	52.6	1,732
Norrköping	82.6	29.5	88,622	29.4	22.7	20.4	6.8	5.1	6.1	4.4	3.7	1.3	40,508	46,925	45.7	52.9	6,417
Söderköping	88.8	3.3	10,026	24.4	26.7	21.4	4.1	7.1	7.1	3.7	4.4	1.1	3,944	5,972	39.3	59.6	2,028
Vadstena	88.8	1.8	5,434	31.7	19.9	21.2	4.5	6.8	6.3	5.1	3.9	0.6	2,616	2,784	48.1	51.2	168
Valdemarsvik	87.1	1.8	5,285	29.8	29.2	17.1	4.1	6.4	7.3	2.0	2.7	1.3	2,241	2,975	42.4	56.3	734
Ydre	89.6	0.9	2,574	25.9	24.5	16.2	2.9	11.2	10.8	4.0	3.3	1.2	1,134	1,409	44.1	54.7	275
Åtvidaberg	87.7	2.6	7,852	34.8	25.8	16.2	3.7	6.2	6.3	3.1	3.0	0.9	3,746	4,032	47.7	51.3	286
Ödeshög	87.1	1.2	3,535	24.4	26.9	17.5	2.8	7.8	12.9	3.9	2.1	1.7	1,373	2,102	38.8	59.5	729
Total	85.3	100.0	300,600	30.6	21.2	19.8	5.6	6.5	6.0	4.6	4.4	1.3	142,117	154,570	47.3	51.4	12,453
Source: Sweden's Election Authority

=== Maps ===
Map of the 2022 Swedish general election shaded by party strength

Map of the 2022 Swedish general election shaded by coalition strength

Coalition results, red (S, V, C, MP) to blue (SD, M, KD, L), shaded by strength

Map results for the Swedish Social Democratic Party (S)

Map results for the Sweden Democrats (SD)

Map results for the Moderate Party (M)

Map results for the Left Party (V)

Map results for the Centre Party (C)

Map results for the Christian Democrats (KD)

Map results for the Green Party (MP)

Map results for the Liberals (L)

== Non-Riksdag parties ==
The eleven largest parties that failed to enter the Riksdag but received more than 0.025% of the vote (1 in 4,000) have been included.

=== Constituencies by percentage share ===
Constituency	Land	Turnout	Share	Votes	PNY	AFS	MED	PP	MOD	KRVP	KN	F!	LPO	DD	KA	RD	
Constituency		%	%		%	%	%	%	%	%	%	%	%	%	%	%	
Constituency	Blekinge	G	86.1	1.6	103,580	0.22	0.30	0.17	0.13	0.07	0.08	0.08	0.04	0.02	0.05	0.02	98.78
Dalarna	S	85.4	2.9	186,598	0.13	0.29	0.17	0.11	0.12	0.08	0.23	0.05	0.06	0.02	0.02	98.53	
Gothenburg	G	80.7	5.4	347,101	1.14	0.24	0.23	0.18	0.12	0.09	0.07	0.09	0.00	0.04	0.05	97.65	
Gotland	G	87.1	0.6	41,459	0.01	0.20	0.10	0.08	0.13	0.02	0.11	0.07	0.13	0.02	0.04	98.49	
Gävleborg	N	83.5	2.8	182,587	0.21	0.27	0.15	0.10	0.10	0.07	0.10	0.03	0.07	0.03	0.01	98.76	
Halland	G	86.6	3.4	221,675	0.18	0.25	0.19	0.07	0.13	0.08	0.08	0.03	0.03	0.04	0.03	98.84	
Jämtland	N	85.0	1.3	85,024	0.05	0.29	0.17	0.16	0.14	0.06	0.12	0.04	0.11	0.03	0.02	98.73	
Jönköping	G	85.3	3.5	229,125	0.24	0.24	0.12	0.10	0.09	0.25	0.06	0.04	0.03	0.02	0.01	98.70	
Kalmar	G	86.0	2.5	161,267	0.19	0.29	0.16	0.13	0.07	0.12	0.10	0.03	0.04	0.03	0.02	98.69	
Kronoberg	G	85.4	1.9	124,992	0.47	0.28	0.16	0.08	0.07	0.10	0.11	0.04	0.06	0.02	0.01	98.52	
Malmö	G	77.2	3.0	192,043	2.10	0.19	0.20	0.18	0.08	0.02	0.06	0.07	0.00	0.02	0.04	96.81	
Norrbotten	N	84.6	2.5	161,455	0.04	0.27	0.14	0.13	0.10	0.14	0.08	0.04	0.06	0.02	0.01	98.89	
Skåne NE	G	83.9	3.1	202,890	0.30	0.29	0.15	0.11	0.08	0.10	0.08	0.03	0.03	0.02	0.04	98.69	
Skåne S	G	87.3	4.0	259,333	0.23	0.26	0.21	0.15	0.06	0.04	0.06	0.04	0.01	0.02	0.04	98.81	
Skåne W	G	81.9	3.0	191,655	0.81	0.27	0.16	0.12	0.09	0.06	0.08	0.04	0.02	0.01	0.02	98.23	
Stockholm	S	84.0	9.4	606,751	0.76	0.22	0.29	0.19	0.10	0.06	0.06	0.08	0.00	0.03	0.04	98.07	
Stockholm County	S	82.5	12.7	822,510	0.52	0.25	0.27	0.17	0.10	0.09	0.08	0.05	0.01	0.03	0.03	98.32	
Södermanland	S	83.5	2.9	184,880	0.39	0.27	0.17	0.11	0.08	0.07	0.08	0.05	0.02	0.03	0.02	98.64	
Uppsala	S	86.0	3.8	248,888	0.37	0.25	0.24	0.15	0.07	0.10	0.09	0.06	0.08	0.04	0.03	98.34	
Värmland	S	85.2	2.8	182,231	0.10	0.25	0.14	0.11	0.07	0.07	0.10	0.04	0.05	0.03	0.01	98.96	
Västerbotten	N	85.8	2.7	177,543	0.06	0.23	0.20	0.13	0.10	0.12	0.06	0.05	0.04	0.03	0.01	98.90	
Västernorrland	N	85.2	2.5	158,721	0.05	0.31	0.14	0.12	0.10	0.09	0.11	0.03	0.08	0.03	0.01	98.85	
Västmanland	S	82.9	2.6	170,749	0.26	0.24	0.18	0.11	0.08	0.08	0.10	0.04	0.05	0.03	0.01	98.71	
Västra Götaland E	G	86.1	2.7	176,526	0.18	0.29	0.13	0.17	0.07	0.16	0.10	0.04	0.03	0.03	0.02	98.72	
Västra Götaland N	G	84.4	2.7	173,655	0.30	0.39	0.14	0.10	0.09	0.11	0.10	0.06	0.03	0.02	0.03	98.56	
Västra Götaland S	G	84.4	2.2	141,906	0.35	0.31	0.19	0.11	0.18	0.13	0.09	0.04	0.05	0.03	0.01	98.44	
Västra Götaland W	G	87.6	3.8	247,863	0.23	0.26	0.20	0.13	0.11	0.11	0.08	0.06	0.01	0.02	0.03	98.68	
Örebro	S	84.7	3.0	194,187	0.42	0.27	0.18	0.16	0.09	0.14	0.10	0.04	0.10	0.02	0.03	98.40	
Östergötland	G	85.3	4.6	300,600	0.19	0.25	0.21	0.17	0.08	0.06	0.08	0.04	0.06	0.03	0.03	98.70	
Total		84.2	100.0	6,477,794	0.44	0.26	0.20	0.14	0.09	0.09	0.08	0.05	0.03	0.03	0.03	98.46	
Source: val.se

=== Constituencies by votes ===
Constituency	Land	Turnout	Share	Votes	PNY	AFS	MED	PP	MOD	KRVP	KN	F!	LPO	DD	KA	Other	RD	
Constituency		%	%															
Constituency	Blekinge	G	86.1	1.6	103,580	226	312	172	134	75	83	78	37	25	52	18	56	102,312
Dalarna	S	85.4	2.9	186,598	237	537	325	196	232	155	434	85	116	45	46	343	183,847	
Gothenburg	G	80.7	5.4	347,101	3,945	847	785	628	417	313	254	299	13	122	162	373	338,943	
Gotland	G	87.1	0.6	41,459	5	82	42	33	53	9	46	30	54	10	17	247	40,831	
Gävleborg	N	83.5	2.8	182,587	377	498	280	184	178	121	177	55	131	47	22	186	180,331	
Halland	G	86.6	3.4	221,675	405	548	428	150	292	176	174	65	69	80	59	124	219,105	
Jämtland	N	85.0	1.3	85,024	46	247	143	140	116	48	106	34	97	23	19	61	83,944	
Jönköping	G	85.3	3.5	229,125	558	558	271	223	208	563	131	88	76	47	24	229	226,149	
Kalmar	G	86.0	2.5	161,267	306	464	261	202	111	196	157	53	69	41	34	220	159,153	
Kronoberg	G	85.4	1.9	124,992	588	346	202	95	84	121	134	44	73	30	15	116	123,144	
Malmö	G	77.2	3.0	192,043	4,029	358	383	346	151	48	107	141	6	43	75	444	185,912	
Norrbotten	N	84.6	2.5	161,455	61	434	234	215	158	218	128	68	93	26	24	133	159,663	
Skåne NE	G	83.9	3.1	202,890	606	592	306	228	153	193	164	64	59	34	75	184	200,232	
Skåne S	G	87.3	4.0	259,333	594	667	533	397	168	98	143	101	20	50	105	217	256,240	
Skåne W	G	81.9	3.0	191,655	1,546	510	311	230	176	114	155	68	32	28	39	176	188,270	
Stockholm	S	84.0	9.4	606,751	4,634	1,310	1,760	1,172	610	375	339	461	27	206	251	573	595,033	
Stockholm County	S	82.5	12.7	822,510	4,253	2,047	2,184	1,420	798	750	646	394	83	235	226	798	808,676	
Södermanland	S	83.5	2.9	184,880	729	508	309	204	139	138	144	87	40	49	28	136	182,369	
Uppsala	S	86.0	3.8	248,888	932	630	587	384	166	257	224	146	202	92	64	447	244,757	
Värmland	S	85.2	2.8	182,231	186	463	257	207	120	123	186	67	84	53	20	134	180,331	
Västerbotten	N	85.8	2.7	177,543	113	415	354	226	169	220	110	85	68	54	19	116	175,594	
Västernorrland	N	85.2	2.5	158,721	87	488	228	192	152	148	171	50	134	42	12	129	156,888	
Västmanland	S	82.9	2.6	170,749	443	407	313	182	139	144	170	69	78	43	18	194	168,549	
Västra Götaland E	G	86.1	2.7	176,526	322	507	236	293	124	277	175	78	50	54	33	115	174,262	
Västra Götaland N	G	84.4	2.7	173,655	685	516	237	169	148	193	165	103	48	33	50	158	171,150	
Västra Götaland S	G	84.4	2.2	141,906	491	436	264	158	250	179	129	54	71	38	19	129	139,688	
Västra Götaland W	G	87.6	3.8	247,863	560	643	496	319	274	272	202	149	20	52	80	209	244,587	
Örebro	S	84.7	3.0	194,187	806	527	351	305	179	265	195	70	191	44	57	126	191,071	
Östergötland	G	85.3	4.6	300,600	582	749	630	503	237	186	249	112	186	82	91	306	296,687	
Total		84.2	100.0	6,477,794	28,352	16,646	12,882	9,135	6,077	5,983	5,493	3,157	2,215	1,755	1,702	6,679	6,377,718	
Source: Sweden's Election Authority
