= List of Swedish regions by Human Development Index =

Map of the Swedish regions by Human Development Index in 2017. Legend: > 0.930 0.930 - 0.920 0.920 - 0.910 0.910 - 0.906 < 0.906

This is a list of NUTS2 statistical regions of Sweden by Human Development Index as of 2023.

| Rank | Region | HDI (2023) |
Very high human development
| 1 | Stockholm | 0.976 |
| – | Sweden (average) | 0.959 |
| 2 | West Sweden | 0.958 |
| 3 | Upper Norrland | 0.957 |
| 4 | East Middle Sweden | 0.948 |
| 4 | Småland and the islands | 0.948 |
| 4 | South Sweden | 0.948 |
| 7 | Middle Norrland | 0.946 |
| 8 | North Middle Sweden | 0.941 |
