= North Sweden =

North Sweden Norra Sverige
- Region
- North Sweden in orange
- Country: Sweden

Area
  - Total: 309,934 km^{2} (119,666 sq mi)

Population (2024)
  - Total: 1,758,372
  - Density: 5.67338/km^{2} (14.6940/sq mi)
- NUTS code: SE3
- HDI (2022): 0.944 very high · 3rd (Upper Norrland)

North Sweden is a subdivision of Sweden as defined by the Nomenclature of Territorial Units for Statistics (NUTS). It is classified as a NUTS-1 statistical region of Sweden. It encompasses an area of 309,934 km^{2} (119,666 sq mi), and is the second largest non-national sub-division in the NUTS classification after Mainland Finland. It incorporates seven counties across three national areas–North Middle Sweden, Middle Norrland and Upper Norrland.

== Sub-division ==
The country of Sweden is organized into eight national areas, which are the primary sub-divisions of the country. These are further divided into 21 regions. For statistical purposes, the Nomenclature of Territorial Units for Statistics (NUTS) organizes the country into three broader level sub-divisions based on cardinal directions. These are classified as a NUTS-1 statistical regions of Sweden, and incorporate various regions within it.

== Geography ==
North Sweden covers most of the land area of Sweden except the southern third of the country. It shares a long border with Norway on the west, and Finland along the rivers of Könkämäeno, Muonionjoki, and Tornionjoki to the north east. The three countries meet at the Three-Country Cairn. The region encompasses an area of 309,934 km^{2} (119,666 sq mi), and is the second largest non-national sub-division in the NUTS classification after Mainland Finland. With parts of the territory located in the Arctic Circle, most of the area has a cold climate. It had a population of over 1.75 million in 2024.

=== Sub-divisions ===
It incorporates seven counties across three national areas–North Middle Sweden, Middle Norrland and Upper Norrland.

Sub-divisions
County	Official name	Area	HASC	ISO	FIPS	NUTS	Capital	Area (km^{2})	Area (mi^{2})	Population (2024)
Värmland County	Värmland län	North Middle Sweden (Norra Mellansverige)	SE.VR	S	SW22	SE311	Karlstad	19,388	7,486	273,489
Dalarna County	Dalarna län	North Middle Sweden (Norra Mellansverige)	SE.KO	W	SW10	SE312	Falun	30,404	11,739	275,711
Gävleborg County	Gävleborgs län	North Middle Sweden (Norra Mellansverige)	SE.GV	X	SW03	SE313	Gävle	19,756	7,628	275,653
Västernorrland County	Västernorrlands län	Middle Norrland (Mellersta Norrland)	SE.VN	Y	SW24	SE321	Härnösand	23,107	8,922	243,978
Jämtland County	Jämtlands län	Middle Norrland (Mellersta Norrland)	SE.JA	Z	SW07	SE322	Östersund	54,100	20,888	127,020
Västerbotten County	Västerbottens län	Upper Norrland (Övre Norrland)	SE.VB	AC	SW23	SE331	Umeå	59,284	22,890	257,581
Norrbotten County	Norrbottens län	Upper Norrland (Övre Norrland)	SE.NB	BD	SW14	SE332	Luleå	106,012	40,931	251,886

== Economy ==
While encompassing a large land area, North Sweden faces unique challenges as most of the area is cold. The region is sparsely populated and has an ageing population. It has about nine percent of the country's population, and contributes to about nine percent of Sweden's GDP. Most of the population were dependent on natural resources, and engage in indigenous activities such as hunting, fishing, trapping, and herding. In the 21st century, with the development of technology and urbanization, there has been an increased impetus to tap the natural resources and develop tourism. The Government of Sweden has also been putting resources to increase the economic contribution of the region.
