= East Sweden =

East Sweden Östra Sverige
- NUTS 1 Region of the EU
- Eastern Sweden in yellow
- Country: Sweden
- Largest city: Stockholm

Area
  - Total: 44,539.9 km^{2} (17,197.0 sq mi)

Population (2017-12-31)
  - Total: 3,995,953
  - Density: 89.7163/km^{2} (232.364/sq mi)
- ISO 3166 code: SE1

East Sweden (Swedish: Östra Sverige) is a NUTS 1 region in Sweden. The region is defined and used by the European Union for statistical purposes, it is not used as a region by Sweden which uses other divisions of the country.

== Subdivision ==
There are two subdivisions of East Sweden called National Areas of Sweden (NUTS 2). They are in turn comprised out of six different counties (NUTS 3).

- SE11 Stockholm
  - Stockholm County acts as a NUTS 2 and 3 region
- SE12 East Middle Sweden
  - Östergötland County
  - Uppsala County
  - Örebro County
  - Västmanland County
  - Södermanland County

== Economy ==
Eurostat estimated the regional nominal GDP to be € 206,003 million and the nominal GDP per capita to be €53,600 in a 2015 study. The same study also showed that the region had a 45% higher GDP per capita than the EU average.

== See also ==
- First-level NUTS of the European Union
- NUTS statistical regions of Sweden
- Lands of Sweden
