= Norland =

Norland can refer to any of the following:

== Art, entertainment, and media ==
- Norland (July 1914), a fictional European country in Arthur Conan Doyle's short story "Danger!"
- Norlands (1936), a fictional Scandinavian country in John Buchan's final Richard Hannay story “The Island of Sheep”.
- Norland (2024), a Colony Sim game that has been developed by the studio Long Jount Ltd.

== Companies and institutions ==
- Miami Norland High School, a high school in Miami Gardens, Florida
- Norland University of Early Childhood, a childcare training facility in Bath, United Kingdom
- Norland Plastics, an auto parts supplier

== People ==
- Cecilie Drabsch Norland (born 1978), Norwegian Paralympic swimmer
- Donald R. Norland (1924–2006), American diplomat
- Maurice Norland (1901–1967), French long-distance runner
- Richard B. Norland (born 1955), American diplomat

== Places ==
- Norland, Florida, USA
- Norland, Ontario, Canada
- Norland, Virginia, USA
- Norland, West Yorkshire, England
- Norland Square, London, England
- Nordland, a county in north Norway
- Norrland, the Northland of Sweden

== Vessels ==
- MV Norland, a ferry used as a troopship during the Falklands War

== See also ==
- The Norlands
- Nordland (disambiguation)
