= Demographics of Sweden =

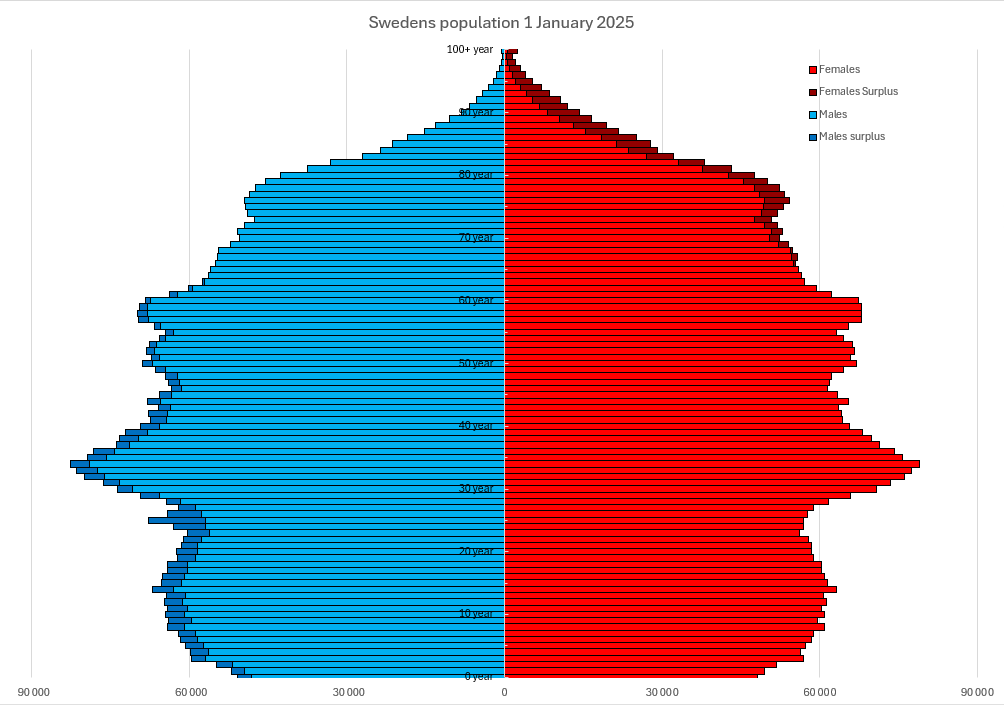
- Population pyramid of Sweden in 2025
- Population: ▲10,605,500 (31 December 2025)
- Growth rate: 0.3% (2025 est.)
- Birth rate: 9.19 births/1,000 population (2025)
- Death rate: 8.69 deaths/1,000 population (2025)
- Life expectancy: 82.8 years
  - male: 82.29 years (2025)
  - female: 85.35 years (2025)
- Fertility rate: 1.42 children born/woman (2025 est.)
- Infant mortality: 2.3 deaths/1,000 live births
- Net migration rate: 1.1 migrant(s)/1,000 population (2025 est.)
- Immigrant share: 21.4% (2024)

Age structure
- 0–14 years: 17.71%
- 15–64 years: 62.18%
- 65 and over: 20.12%

Sex ratio
- Total: 1.01 male(s)/female (2022 est.)
- At birth: 1.06 male(s)/female
- 65 and over: 0.69 male(s)/female

Nationality
- Nationality: noun: Swede(s) adjective: Swedish
- Major ethnic: Swedes (Native)
- Minor ethnic: Arabs; Finns; Persians; Africans; Turks; Assyrians; Germans; Kurds; Baloch; Poles; Norwegians; Danes; Serbs; Sámi (Native); Croats; Others

Language
- Official: Swedish
- Spoken: Swedish, others

The demographics of Sweden are monitored by the Statistiska centralbyrån (Statistics Sweden). Sweden's population was 10,605,500 (31 December 2025), making it the 15th-most populous country in Europe after Portugal, the 10th-most populous member state of the European Union, and the 89th-most populous country in the world. The total fertility rate was rated at 1.43 in 2024, which is far below the replacement rate of 2.1.

The population exceeded 10 million for the first time on Friday, 20 January 2017. The three largest cities are Stockholm, Gothenburg and Malmö. Sweden's population has become much more ethnically, religiously and linguistically non-Swedish over the past 70 years as a result of immigration. Every fourth (24.9%) resident in the country has a foreign background and every third (32.3%) has at least one parent born abroad. The most common foreign ancestry is Finnish.

Statistics Sweden projects a Swedish population of 12.6 million in 2070.

== Population ==
=== Cities ===
Sweden has 17 cities with a population of over 100,000 people. Most of Sweden's population lives in Svealand and Götaland.

=== Fertility ===
The total fertility rate is the number of children born per woman. It is based on fairly good data for the entire period. Sources: Our World In Data and Gapminder Foundation.

Sweden total fertility rate over time (1630 - 2016)

Years	1630	1632	1634	1636	1638	1640	1642	1644	1646	1648	1650	1652	1654	1656	1658
Total fertility rate in Sweden	4.81	4.25	3.89	4.38	4.4	4.92	4.38	4.25	4.95	5.4	4.34	4.54	5.33	4.72	4.58

Years	1660	1662	1664	1666	1668	1670	1672	1674	1676	1678	1680	1682	1684	1686	1688
Total fertility rate in Sweden	4.2	4.54	5.01	4.98	4.6	5.13	5.01	4.38	4.28	4.35	4.64	5.4	5.25	4.84	5.29

Years	1690	1692	1694	1696	1698	1700	1702	1704	1706	1708	1710	1712	1714	1716	1718
Total fertility rate in Sweden	4.99	5.11	4.98	5.33	5.11	5.56	5.81	5.52	5.16	5.32	4.3	5.63	5.81	4.92	5.13

Years	1720	1722	1724	1726	1728	1730	1732	1734	1736	1738	1740	1742	1744	1746	1748
Total fertility rate in Sweden	4.62	5.09	5.02	4.75	4.23	4.77	4.86	4.77	4.51	4.96	4.52	4.35	5.02	4.85	4.86

Years	1750	1752	1754	1756	1758	1760	1762	1764	1766	1768	1770	1772	1774	1776	1778
Total fertility rate in Sweden	5.09	5.29	5.4	5.23	4.68	5.06	4.98	4.92	4.79	4.77	4.68	4.1	4.89	4.67	4.94

Years	1780	1782	1784	1786	1788	1790	1792	1794	1796	1798	1800
Total fertility rate in Sweden	5.06	4.54	4.47	4.67	4.81	4.33	5.19	4.79	4.92	4.79	4.07

Swedish population pyramid, 1860–2020

Years	1801	1802	1803	1804	1805	1806	1807	1808	1809	1810
Total fertility rate in Sweden	4.26	4.5	4.45	4.52	4.5	4.36	4.42	4.31	3.78	4.67

Years	1811	1812	1813	1814	1815	1816	1817	1818	1819	1820
Total fertility rate in Sweden	5.01	4.76	4.22	4.42	4.93	5.01	4.74	4.8	4.68	4.68

Years	1821	1822	1823	1824	1825	1826	1827	1828	1829	1830
Total fertility rate in Sweden	5.03	5.09	5.22	4.9	5.18	4.94	4.44	4.77	4.94	4.67

Years	1831	1832	1833	1834	1835	1836	1837	1838	1839	1840
Total fertility rate in Sweden	4.32	4.38	4.84	4.78	4.63	4.52	4.37	4.17	4.18	4.46

Years	1841	1842	1843	1844	1845	1846	1847	1848	1849	1850
Total fertility rate in Sweden	4.3	4.49	4.36	4.56	4.46	4.25	4.2	4.3	4.66	4.45

Historical population of Sweden

Years	1851	1852	1853	1854	1855	1856	1857	1858	1859	1860
Total fertility rate in Sweden	4.36	4.2	4.26	4.53	4.3	4.23	4.36	4.66	4.71	4.71

Years	1861	1862	1863	1864	1865	1866	1867	1868	1869	1870
Total fertility rate in Sweden	4.44	4.59	4.65	4.69	4.58	4.68	4.4	3.93	4.03	4.11

Years	1871	1872	1873	1874	1875	1876	1877	1878	1879	1880
Total fertility rate in Sweden	4.37	4.34	4.49	4.54	4.6	4.57	4.62	4.44	4.56	4.36

Years	1881	1882	1883	1884	1885	1886	1887	1888	1889	1890
Total fertility rate in Sweden	4.29	4.32	4.24	4.4	4.34	4.39	4.36	4.24	4.1	4.15

Years	1891	1892	1893	1894	1895	1896	1897	1898	1899	1900
Total fertility rate in Sweden	4.14	3.93	3.97	3.94	4.01	3.98	3.92	3.99	3.9	4

=== Life expectancy ===
Sources: Our World In Data and the United Nations.

1751–1949

Years	1751	1754	1756	1768	1776	1781	1789	1795	1810	1818	1824	1837	1847	1855	1861
Life expectancy in Sweden	38.4	37.4	36.2	35.0	41.5	37.8	31.2	36.5	31.9	40.0	44.9	39.6	40.1	43.0	47.1

Years	1868	1872	1878	1884	1890	1896	1905	1911	1913	1916	1922	1929	1935	1943	1949
Life expectancy in Sweden	43.2	50.0	47.6	49.1	50.4	53.4	54.5	58.0	58.7	58.2	61.0	62.3	64.9	68.7	70.8

1950–2015

Life expectancy in Sweden since 1751

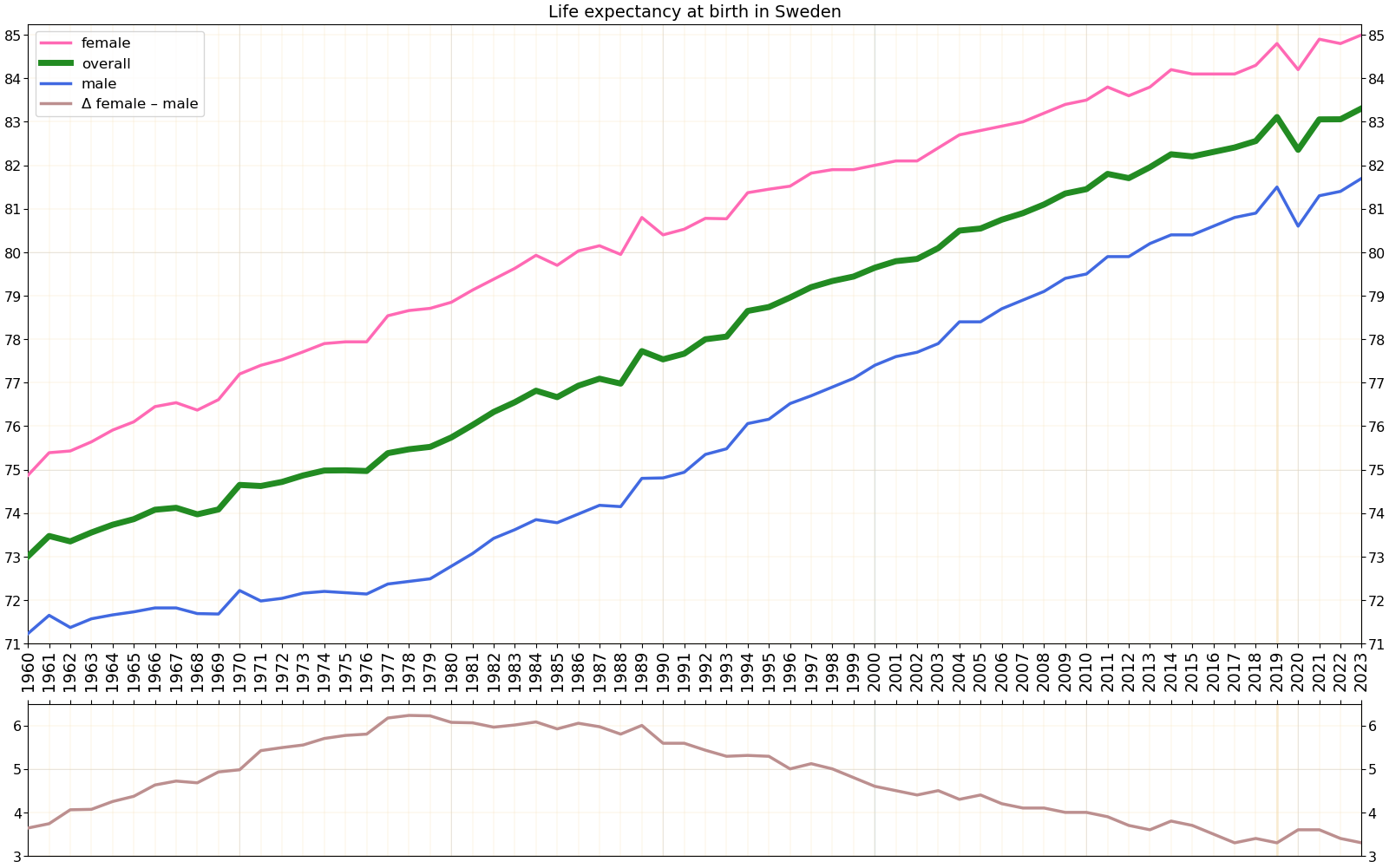
Life expectancy in Sweden since 1960 by gender

Period	Life expectancy in Years	Period	Life expectancy in Years
1950–1955	71.9	1985–1990	77.2
1955–1960	72.9	1990–1995	78.2
1960–1965	73.5	1995–2000	79.3
1965–1970	74.1	2000–2005	80.1
1970–1975	74.8	2005–2010	81.1
1975–1980	75.4	2010–2015	81.9
1980–1985	76.4		

Source: UN World Population Prospects

Largest cities or towns in Sweden "Kommungruppsindelning 2017". & "SCB befolkningsstatistik".
Rank	Name	County	Pop.	Metro.	Rank	Name	County	Pop.	Metro.
1	Stockholm	Stockholm	952,058	2,205,105	11	Umeå	Västerbotten	125,434	137,800
2	Gothenburg	Västra Götaland	565,496	1,015,974	12	Lund	Skåne	121,893	197,300
3	Malmö	Skåne	351,749	689,206	13	Borås	Västra Götaland	111,354	151,300
4	Uppsala	Uppsala	221,141	257,200	14	Huddinge	Stockholm	110,335	136,000
5	Linköping	Östergötland	158,953	189,800	15	Eskilstuna	Södermanland	105,014	110,900
6	Örebro	Örebro	150,949	196,700	16	Nacka	Stockholm	101,697	114,800
7	Västerås	Västmanland	150,564	169,200	17	Gävle	Gävleborg	100,825	107,500
8	Helsingborg	Skåne	143,671	321,500	18	Halmstad	Halland	99,932	119,300
9	Norrköping	Östergötland	140,991	149,600	19	Sundsvall	Västernorrland	98,837	115,300
10	Jönköping	Jönköping	137,863	156,700	20	Södertälje	Stockholm	96,254	158,300

=== Statistics ===
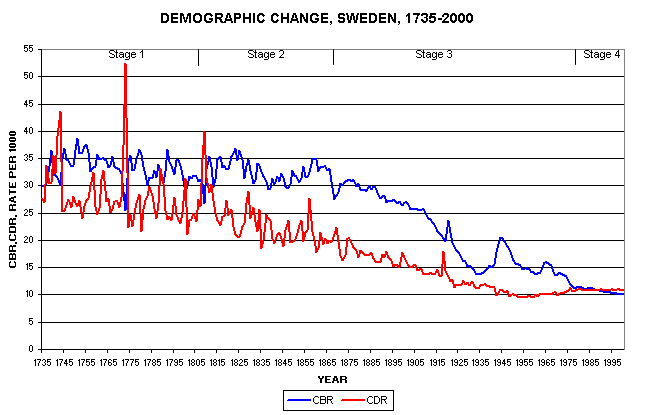
Estimated birth rate (blue) and death rate (red) in Sweden for the period of 1735 to 2000. The graph indicates strong population growth for the period of 1800 to 1970, and a beginning population decline from the 1980s.

The birth and death rates in Sweden 1950–2008.

Demographic statistics according to the CIA World Factbook, unless otherwise indicated.

View source data.
(Note: Crude migration change (per 1,000) is a trend analysis, an extrapolation based average population change (current year minus previous) minus natural change of the current year (see table vital statistics). As average population is an estimate of the population in the middle of the year and not end of the year.) View source data.
View source data.
View source data.

=== Population change ===
Population density in the counties of Sweden. people/km^{2} 0–9.9 10–24.9 25–49.9 50–99.9 100–199.9 200+

The demography of Sweden is monitored by Statistics Sweden (SCB).

The 2005 Swedish census showed an increase of 1,488,322 compared to the 1990 census, an average increase of 88,680 annually. During the 1930s, birth rate increased by more than 88128.5 children per year while death rates fell and immigration surged. In the early 2000s, birth rate declined as immigration increased further, with the context of unrest in the Middle East, upholding steady population growth.

=== Population projections ===
In 1950 Sweden had fewer people aged 10–20 with more people ages 20–30 and 0–10. In 2017 the ratio of male to female remains steady at about 50–50. As a whole, the graph broadens with people appearing to live longer. In 2050 it is predicted that all ages will increase from below 300,000 males and females to above 300,000 males and females. With about 50,000 people living to the ages of 90–100. In 2100 the graph is shaped as a rectangle with people of all ages and genders remaining steady. It narrows slightly at the top of the graph with about 250,000/300,000 males and females living to be 90–100 years old. Statistics Sweden projects the following population development in Sweden:

Year	Projection
2016	9,995,000
2020	10,431,000
2026	11,046,000
2030	11,344,000
2040	11,898,000
2050	12,395,000
2060	12,858,000

Eurostat projects a population in Sweden reaching 11,994,364 people in 2040 and 14,388,478 in 2080.

=== Urbanisation and population density ===
The population density is just over 25 people per km^{2} (65 per square mile), with 1,437 persons per km^{2} in localities (continuous settlement with at least 200 inhabitants).^{,} 87% of the population live in urban areas, which cover 1.5% of the entire land area. 63% of Swedes are in large urban areas. The population density is substantially higher in the south than in the north. The capital city Stockholm has a municipal population of about 950,000 (with 1.5 million in the urban area and 2.3 million in the metropolitan area). The second- and third-largest cities are Gothenburg and Malmö. Greater Gothenburg counts just over a million inhabitants and the same goes for the western part of Scania, along the Öresund. The Öresund Region, the Danish-Swedish cross-border region around the Öresund that Malmö is part of, has a population of 4 million. Outside of major cities, areas with notably higher population density include the agricultural part of Östergötland, the western coast, the area around Lake Mälaren and the agricultural area around Uppsala.

Norrland, which covers approximately 60% of the Swedish territory, has a very low population density (below 5 people per square kilometer). The mountains and most of the remote coastal areas are almost unpopulated. Low population density exists also in large parts of western Svealand, as well as southern and central Småland. An area known as Finnveden, which is located in the south-west of Småland, and mainly below the 57th parallel, can also be considered as almost empty of people.

== Origin ==
Population pyramid of Sweden over time by origin

Percentage born to foreign born mothers

Before World War II, Sweden had a relatively homogenous population that was predominately White. The majority of the population are ethnic Swedes, or people who can trace most of their ethnicity to Sweden going back at least 12 generations. The Sweden Finns are a large ethnic minority comprising approximately 50,000 along the Swedish-Finnish border, and 450,000 first and second-generation immigrated ethnic Finns, mainly living in the Mälaren Valley region. Meänkieli Finnish has official status in parts of northern Sweden near the Finnish border.

In addition, Sweden's indigenous population groups include the Sámi people, who have a history of practicing hunting and gathering and gradually adopting a largely semi-nomadic reindeer herding lifestyle. The Sámi have lived in Fennoscandia from at earliest 3,500 years to at latest around 2,650 years ago, with evidence of a distinct ethnic identity linked to an early Sámi language diverging from early Finnish by the first millennium BC. Sámi presence in Scandinavia does not predate Norse/Scandinavian settlement of Scandinavia, as sometimes assumed — the migration of Germanic-speaking peoples to Southern Scandinavia happened independently and separate from the later Sámi migrations into the northern regions. However, Sámi presence in those northernmost regions, called Sápmi, does predate the Viking expansion, the establishment of Sweden as a country, and Sweden's colonization of Sápmi during the 1600s. It is this presence in the northernmost areas of Sweden, predating the Swedish colonization and presence in the Sápmi regions of Sweden, that is the basis for their classification as an indigenous people under ILO 169. Today, the Sámi language holds the status of official minority language in the Norrbotten, Västerbotten and Jämtland counties.

In addition to the Sámi, Tornedalers, and Sweden Finns, Jewish and Roma people have national minority status in Sweden.

There are no official statistics on ethnicity, but according to Statistics Sweden, around two million (19.6%) inhabitants in Sweden are born in another country. Of those, more than half are Swedish citizens. The most common countries of origin were Syria (1.82%), Finland (1.45%), Iraq (1.41%), Poland (0.91%), Iran (0.76%) and Somalia (0.67%). The average age in Sweden is 41.1 years.

There are at least two studies that forecast future demographic changes in Sweden largely due to immigration and low birth rates. A 2006 study states that "[based upon current data, extrapolated with relevant assumptions] Sweden and the Netherlands would have majority foreign-origin populations by the end of the [21st] century." A 2018 study concluded that in Sweden by "2065, the share of the native population is [set] to decrease to 49%, the Western population is projected to fall to 63%, and the Muslim population increase to 25%." Thomas Lindh, at the time head researcher for the Swedish Institute for Futures Studies, claimed in an interview that by the year "2050, more than half of Sweden's population will be immigrants or second-generation immigrants."

Origin statistics in Sweden back to 1900
Background Groups	Year																									
Background Groups	1900		1930		1950		1960		1970		1980		1990		2002		2005		2010		2015		2020		2025	
Background Groups	Number	%	Number	%	Number	%	Number	%	Number	%	Number	%	Number	%	Number	%	Number	%	Number	%	Number	%	Number	%	Number	%
Swedes with two Swedish parents	–	–	–	–	–	–	–	–	–	90%	–	87%	–	84%	7,028,802	78.61%	6,997,684	77.34%	6,965,033	73.97%	6,939,156	70.44%	6,900,476	66.5%	6,823,598	64.3%
Swedes with one Swedish parent and one foreign born	–	–	–	–	–	–	–	–	–	3%	–	4%	–	5%	553,772	6.19%	586,710	6.48%	652,648	6.93%	724,841	7.35%	792,779	7.6%	845,089	8.0%
Total: Swedes	–	–	–	–	–	–	–	–	–	93%	7,561,000	91%	7,613,600	88.6%	7,582,574	84.8%	7,584,394	83.82%	7,617,681	80.90%	7,663,997	77.79%	7,693,255	74.1%	7,668,687	72.3%
Born in Sweden to two foreign-born parents	–	–	–	–	–	–	–	–	–	1%	130,000	1.5%	187,000	2.2%	304,751	3.40%	337,568	3.73%	412,960	4.38%	510,756	5.18%	639,309	6.2%	726,205	6.8%
Born outside Sweden	36,000	0.7%	62,000	1%	198,000	2.8%	300,000	4%	538,000	6.7%	627,000	7.5%	790,000	9.2%	1,053,463	11.78%	1,125,790	12.44%	1,384,929	14.70%	1,676,264	17.01%	2,046,731	19.7%	2,210,638	20.8%
Total: Foreign background	–	–	–	–	–	–	–	–	–	–	757,000	9%	977,000	11.4%	1,358,214	15.19%	1,463,358	16.17%	1,797,889	19.09%	2,187,020	22.20%	2,686,040	25.9%	2,936,843	27.7%
Overall Total	5,136,441	100%	6,142,191	100%	7,041,829	100%	7,497,967	100%	8,081,229	100%	8,317,937	100%	8,590,630	100%	8,940,788	100%	9,047,752	100%	9,415,570	100%	9,851,017	100%	10,379,295	100%	10,605,529	100%

Origin groups mapped as percentage of the population in counties in Sweden

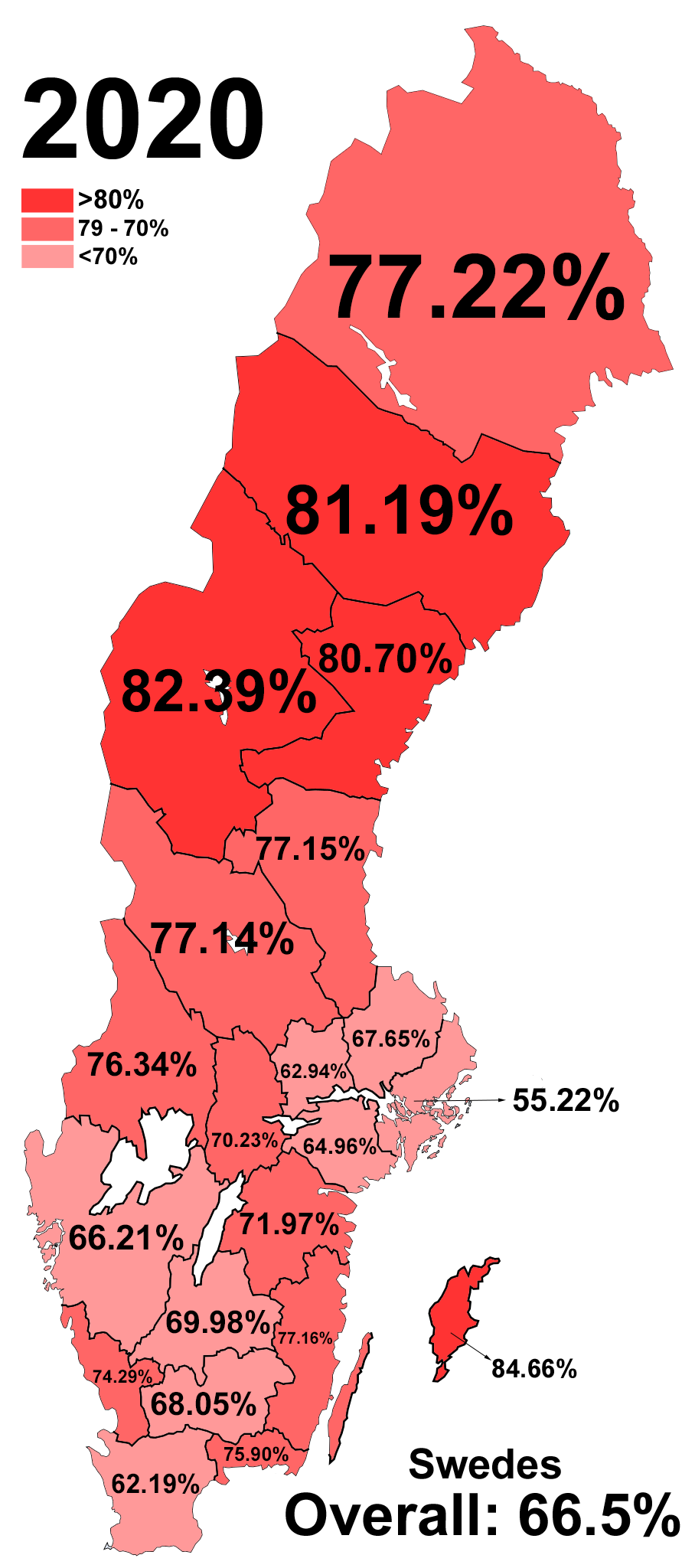
Swedes of two Swedish parents in Sweden's counties and overall as of 2020.

Percentage of those of a foreign background in total in Sweden in 2021
Population pyramids of each origin group

Population pyramid of Sweden by origin group in 2021

Swede of two Swedish parents

Swede of one Swedish parent and one foreign born

Foreign born

Born in Sweden to two foreign born parents

Foreign born within Stockholm county by municipality in 2021

=== Extended origin background statistics ===
Extended origin background statistics
Country	1994		
Country	1st generation	2nd generation	Total
Nordic countries	298,844	349,140	647,984
Denmark	40,907		93,650
Finland	207,796	235,042	442,838
Iceland	4,285		6,358
Norway	45,851		108,340
Other Europe	306,503	182,996	489,499
Greece	12,441		23,671
Yugoslavia	112,320	36,685	149,005
Poland	39,009		62,533
Romania	10,885	3,136	14,021
United Kingdom	12,569		24,588
Germany	36,500		86,894
Hungary	14,799		27,646
Other	67,980		101,141
Africa	44,961	22,740	67,701
Ethiopia	11,384	4,056	15,440
Other Africa	33,577	18,68	35,445
North America	15,598	17,370	32,968
United States	13,746	15,586	29,332
Other North America	1,852	1,784	3,636
Latin America	53,471	21,262	74,733
Asia	34,941	11,257	46,198
India	9,953		13,607
Vietnam	9,219		12,626
South Korea	8,447		9,895
Thailand	7,322		10,070
Middle East + Turkey	131,989	53,189	185,178
Iraq	23,389		29,454
Iran	48,693		59,246
Syria	9,072	5,973	15,045
Lebanon	21,593		31,248
Turkey	29,242		50,185
Oceania	2,232	1,243	3,475
Total	922,055	676,468	1,598,523

== Vital statistics ==
Births and deaths over time in Sweden

Data according to Statistics Sweden, which collects the official statistics for Sweden.

Notable events in Swedish demographics:

- 1808–1809 – Dano-Swedish War
- Swedish famine of 1867–1869
- 1914–1918 – First World War

	Average population (31 Dec)	Live births	Deaths	Natural change	Crude birth rate (per 1000)	Crude death rate (per 1000)	Natural change (per 1000)	Crude migration change (per 1000)	Total fertility rates (Note: In fertility rates, 2.1 and above represents a stable or increasing population and have been marked blue, while 2.0 and below leads to an aging and, ultimately, declining population.)	Infant mortality rate (per 1000)
1800	2,347,303	67,555	73,928	−6,373	28.8	31.5	−2.7		4.07	
1801	2,354,952	70,629	61,317	9,312	30.0	26.0	4.0	−0.7	4.26	
1802	2,372,216	74,963	56,035	18,928	31.6	23.6	8.0	−0.7	4.50	
1803	2,388,619	74,644	56,577	18,067	31.3	23.7	7.6	−0.7	4.45	
1804	2,403,814	76,443	59,584	16,859	31.8	24.8	7.0	−0.6	4.52	
1805	2,422,039	76,552	56,663	19,889	31.6	23.4	8.2	0.7	4.50	
1806	2,428,734	74,581	66,728	7,853	30.7	27.5	3.2	−5.3	4.36	
1807	2,439,599	75,842	63,818	12,024	31.1	26.2	4.9	0.5	4.42	
1808	2,427,592	73,963	84,811	−10,848	30.5	34.9	−4.5	−9.5	4.31	
1809	2,394,101	64,300	96,532	−32,232	26.9	40.3	−13.5	−19.3	3.78	
1810	2,396,351	78,916	75,607	3,309	32.9	31.5	1.4	1.6	4.67	
1811	2,411,382	84,862	69,246	15,616	35.2	28.7	6.5	0.9	5.01	
1812	2,418,780	81,079	73,095	7,984	33.5	30.2	3.3	−3.0	4.76	
1813	2,423,949	72,021	66,266	5,755	29.7	27.3	2.4	−0.8	4.22	
1814	2,438,241	75,837	60,959	14,878	31.1	25.0	6.1	4.4	4.42	
1815	2,465,066	85,239	57,829	27,410	34.6	23.5	11.1	8.2	4.93	
1816	2,497,484	87,644	56,225	31,419	35.1	22.5	12.6	8.7	5.01	
1817	2,521,442	83,821	60,863	22,958	33.2	24.1	9.1	1.8	4.74	
1818	2,546,411	85,714	61,745	23,969	33.7	24.2	9.4	4.7	4.80	
1819	2,561,780	84,250	69,881	14,369	32.9	27.3	5.6	−3.2	4.68	
1820	2,584,690	84,841	62,930	21,911	32.8	24.3	8.5	6.4	4.68	
1821	2,610,870	92,072	66,416	25,656	35.3	25.4	9.8	6.1	5.03	
1822	2,646,314	94,309	59,390	34,919	35.6	22.4	13.2	7.4	5.09	
1823	2,689,031	98,259	56,067	42,192	36.5	20.9	15.7	10.0	5.22	
1824	2,726,877	93,577	56,256	37,321	34.3	20.6	13.7	3.6	4.90	
1825	2,771,252	100,315	56,465	43,850	36.2	20.4	15.8	9.2	5.18	
1826	2,804,926	97,125	63,027	34,098	34.6	22.5	12.2	2.6	4.94	
1827	2,827,719	88,138	64,920	23,218	31.2	23.0	8.2	−1.6	4.44	
1828	2,846,788	95,354	75,860	19,494	33.5	26.6	6.9	−0.2	4.74	
1829	2,863,132	99,488	82,719	16,769	34.7	28.9	5.9	−0.6	4.94	
1830	2,888,082	94,626	69,251	25,375	32.8	24.0	8.8	4.6	4.67	
1831	2,901,039	88,253	75,274	12,979	30.4	26.0	4.5	−4.0	4.32	
1832	2,922,801	89,862	68,078	21,784	30.7	23.3	7.4	3.6	4.38	
1833	2,959,141	100,309	63,947	36,362	33.9	21.6	12.3	9.5	4.84	
1834	2,983,055	100,231	76,294	23,937	33.6	25.6	8.0	0.3	4.78	
1835	3,025,439	98,144	55,738	42,406	32.4	18.4	14.0	0.0	4.63	
1836	3,059,356	96,857	60,763	36,094	31.7	19.9	11.8	−0.7	4.52	
1837	3,076,184	94,616	75,611	19,005	30.8	24.6	6.2	−0.7	4.17	
1838	3,090,262	90,565	74,309	16,256	29.3	24.0	5.3	−0.3	4.37	
1839	3,106,459	91,363	72,988	18,375	29.4	23.5	5.9	0.4	4.18	
1840	3,138,887	98,160	63,555	34,605	31.3	20.2	11.0	2.1	4.46	
1841	3,173,160	95,734	61,279	34,455	30.2	19.3	10.9	−0.2	4.30	
1842	3,206,776	100,976	67,177	33,799	31.5	21.0	10.5	−0.2	4.49	
1843	3,236,632	99,154	69,115	30,039	30.6	21.4	9.3	−1.5	4.36	
1844	3,275,133	104,693	66,009	38,684	32.0	20.2	11.8	4.6	4.56	
1845	3,316,536	103,660	62,074	41,586	31.3	18.7	12.5	2.2	4.46	
1846	3,342,927	99,703	72,683	27,020	29.8	21.7	8.1	−4.4	4.25	
1847	3,362,072	99,179	79,405	19,774	29.5	23.6	5.9	−2.8	4.20	
1848	3,397,454	102,524	66,513	36,011	30.2	19.6	10.6	7.4	4.30	
1849	3,441,286	112,304	67,842	44,462	32.6	19.7	12.9	3.9	4.66	
1850	3,482,541	110,399	68,514	41,885	31.7	19.7	12.0	−0.2	4.45	
1851	3,516,647	111,065	72,506	38,559	31.6	20.6	11.0	−1.4	4.36	
1852	3,540,409	108,305	80,090	28,215	30.6	22.6	8.0	−5.3	4.20	
1853	3,563,316	111,407	84,047	27,360	31.3	23.6	7.7	−0.5	4.26	
1854	3,608,124	120,107	70,846	49,261	33.3	19.6	13.7	8.0	4.53	
1855	3,641,011	115,072	77,734	37,338	31.6	21.3	10.3	−1.9	4.30	
1856	3,672,988	115,082	79,618	35,464	31.3	21.7	9.6	−0.5	4.23	
1857	3,687,601	119,349	101,491	17,858	32.4	27.5	4.8	−6.2	4.36	
1858	3,734,240	129,039	80,498	48,541	34.6	21.6	13.0	11.7	4.66	
1859	3,787,735	131,605	75,720	55,885	34.8	20.0	14.8	4.5	4.71	
1860	3,859,728	133,162	67,502	65,660	34.5	17.5	17.0	9.2	4.71	
1861	3,917,339	126,634	71,829	54,805	32.3	18.3	14.0	−3.4	4.44	
1862	3,965,899	131,584	84,350	47,234	33.2	21.3	11.9	−2.0	4.59	
1863	4,022,564	134,279	77,227	57,052	33.4	19.2	14.2	6.7	4.65	
1864	4,070,061	136,004	81,937	54,067	33.4	20.1	13.3	−0.8	4.65	
1865	4,114,141	134,281	79,216	55,065	32.6	19.3	13.4	−1.9	4.58	
1866	4,160,677	136,989	82,666	54,323	32.9	19.9	13.0	2.0	4.68	
1867	4,195,681	128,832	82,072	46,760	30.7	19.6	11.1	−3.8	4.40	
1868	4,173,080	114,955	87,807	27,148	27.5	21.0	6.5	−21.2	3.93	
1869	4,158,757	117,677	92,775	24,902	28.3	22.3	6.0	−4.1	4.03	
1870	4,168,525	119,838	82,449	37,389	28.7	19.8	9.0	−6.6	4.11	
1871	4,204,177	127,333	72,046	55,287	30.3	17.1	13.1	−4.7	4.47	
1872	4,250,412	126,983	68,802	58,181	29.9	16.2	13.7	−2.8	4.34	
1873	4,297,972	131,643	73,525	58,118	30.6	17.1	13.5	−0.2	4.49	
1874	4,341,559	133,249	87,760	45,489	30.7	20.2	10.5	−5.3	4.54	
1875	4,383,291	135,958	88,439	47,519	31.0	20.2	10.8	0.7	4.60	
1876	4,429,713	135,890	86,334	49,556	30.7	19.5	11.2	2.2	4.57	
1877	4,484,542	138,476	83,175	55,301	30.9	18.5	12.3	3.4	4.62	
1878	4,531,863	134,464	81,418	53,046	29.7	18.0	11.7	−1.2	4.44	
1879	4,578,901	139,043	77,152	61,891	30.4	16.8	13.5	2.4	4.56	
1880	4,565,668	134,262	82,753	51,509	29.4	18.1	11.3	−14.2	4.36	
1881	4,572,245	132,804	80,800	52,004	29.0	17.7	11.4	−9.9	4.29	
1882	4,579,115	134,300	79,406	54,894	29.3	17.3	12.0	−10.5	4.32	
1883	4,603,595	132,875	79,487	53,388	28.9	17.3	11.6	0.2	4.24	
1884	4,644,448	138,745	81,077	57,668	29.9	17.5	12.4	5.9	4.40	
1885	4,682,769	137,308	82,781	54,527	29.3	17.7	11.6	5.2	4.34	
1886	4,717,189	139,882	78,045	61,837	29.6	16.5	13.1	5.6	4.39	
1887	4,734,901	140,169	76,227	63,942	29.6	16.1	13.5	−0.8	4.36	
1888	4,748,257	136,451	75,831	60,620	28.7	16.0	12.8	−3.1	4.24	
1889	4,774,409	132,069	76,124	55,945	27.7	15.9	11.7	4.3	4.10	
1890	4,784,981	133,597	81,824	51,773	27.9	17.1	10.8	−3.9	4.15	
1891	4,802,751	135,516	80,603	54,913	28.2	16.8	11.4	2.6	4.14	
1892	4,806,865	129,622	85,894	43,728	27.0	17.9	9.1	−4.4	3.93	
1893	4,824,150	131,729	81,027	50,702	27.3	16.8	10.5	4.0	3.97	
1894	4,873,183	131,409	79,444	51,965	27.0	16.3	10.7	8.9	3.94	
1895	4,919,260	134,599	74,368	60,231	27.4	15.1	12.2	8.0	4.01	
1896	4,962,568	134,308	77,259	57,049	27.1	15.6	11.5	5.1	3.98	
1897	5,009,632	132,999	76,558	56,441	26.6	15.3	11.3	5.7	3.92	
1898	5,062,918	136,523	75,949	60,574	27.0	15.0	12.0	6.8	3.99	
1899	5,097,402	133,882	89,678	44,204	26.3	17.6	8.7	−5.5	3.09	
1900	5,136,441	138,139	86,146	51,993	27.0	16.8	10.2	−2.5	4.02	
1901	5,175,228	139,370	82,772	56,598	27.0	16.1	10.9	−3.3	4.04	
1902	5,198,752	137,364	79,722	57,642	26.5	15.4	11.1	-6.6	3.95	
1903	5,221,291	133,896	78,610	55,286	25.7	15.1	10.6	−6.3	3.82	
1904	5,260,811	134,952	80,152	54,800	25.7	15.3	10.4	−2.8	3.83	
1905	5,294,885	135,409	82,443	52,966	25.7	15.6	10.1	−3.6	3.83	
1906	5,337,055	136,620	76,366	60,254	25.7	14.4	11.3	−3.3	3.81	
1907	5,377,713	136,793	78,149	58,644	25.5	14.6	10.9	−3.3	3.77	
1908	5,429,600	138,874	80,568	58,306	25.7	14.9	10.8	−1.2	3.79	
1909	5,476,441	139,505	74,538	64,967	25.6	13.7	11.9	−3.3	3.71	
1910	5,522,403	135,625	77,212	58,413	24.7	14.0	10.7	−2.3	3.60	
1911	5,561,799	132,977	76,462	56,515	24.0	13.8	10.2	−3.1	3.49	
1912	5,604,192	132,868	79,241	53,627	23.8	14.2	9.6	−2.0	3.44	
1913	5,638,583	130,200	76,724	53,476	23.2	13.6	9.6	−3.5	3.32	
1914	5,679,607	129,458	78,311	51,147	22.9	13.8	9.1	−1.8	3.29	
1915	5,712,740	122,997	83,587	39,410	21.6	14.7	6.9	−1.1	3.06	
1916	5,757,566	121,679	77,771	43,908	21.2	13.6	7.6	0.2	2.99	
1917	5,800,847	120,855	77,385	43,470	20.9	13.4	7.5	0.0	2.93	
1918	5,813,850	117,955	104,594	13,361	20.3	18.0	2.3	−0.1	2.83	
1919	5,847,037	115,193	84,289	30,904	19.8	14.5	5.3	0.4	2.72	
1920	5,904,489	138,753	78,128	60,625	23.6	13.3	10.3	−0.5	3.22	
1921	5,954,316	127,723	73,536	54,187	21.5	12.4	9.1	−0.7	2.93	
1922	5,987,520	116,946	76,343	40,603	19.6	12.8	6.8	−1.2	2.66	
1923	6,005,759	113,435	68,424	45,011	18.9	11.4	7.5	−4.5	2.55	
1924	6,036,118	109,055	72,001	37,054	18.1	12.0	6.1	−1.0	2.43	
1925	6,053,562	106,292	70,918	35,374	17.6	11.7	5.9	−3.0	2.34	
1926	6,074,368	102,007	71,344	30,663	16.8	11.8	5.0	−1.6	2.22	
1927	6,087,923	97,994	77,219	20,775	16.1	12.7	3.4	−1.2	2.11	
1928	6,105,190	97,868	73,267	24,601	16.1	12.0	4.1	−1.3	2.08	
1929	6,120,080	92,861	74,538	18,323	15.2	12.2	3.0	−0.6	1.95	
1930	6,142,191	94,220	71,790	22,430	15.4	11.7	3.7	−0.1	1.96	
1931	6,162,446	91,074	77,121	13,953	14.8	12.5	2.3	1.0	1.88	
1932	6,190,364	89,779	71,459	18,320	14.5	11.6	2.9	1.6	1.83	
1933	6,211,566	85,020	69,607	15,413	13.7	11.2	2.5	0.9	1.72	
1934	6,233,090	85,092	69,921	15,171	13.7	11.2	2.5	1.0	1.67	
1935	6,250,506	85,906	72,813	13,093	13.8	11.7	2.1	0.7	1.70	
1936	6,266,888	88,938	74,836	14,102	14.2	12.0	2.2	0.4	1.75	
1937	6,284,722	90,373	75,392	14,981	14.4	12.0	2.4	0.4	1.77	
1938	6,310,214	93,946	72,693	21,253	14.9	11.5	3.4	0.7	1.84	
1939	6,341,303	97,380	72,876	24,504	15.4	11.5	3.9	1.0	1.90	
1940	6,371,432	95,778	72,748	23,030	15.1	11.4	3.7	1.1	1.86	
1941	6,406,474	99,727	71,910	27,817	15.6	11.3	4.3	1.2	1.92	
1942	6,458,200	113,961	63,741	50,220	17.7	9.9	7.8	0.3	2.19	
1943	6,522,827	125,392	66,105	59,287	19.3	10.2	9.1	0.9	2.41	
1944	6,597,348	134,991	72,284	62,707	20.6	11.0	10.6	0.8	2.61	
1945	6,673,749	135,373	71,901	63,472	20.4	10.8	10.4	1.2	2.63	
1946	6,763,685	132,597	70,635	61,962	19.7	10.5	9.2	4.3	2.57	26.5
1947	6,842,046	128,779	73,579	55,200	18.9	10.8	8.1	3.5	2.50	25.4
1948	6,924,888	126,683	67,693	58,990	18.4	9.8	8.6	3.5	2.47	23.2
1949	6,986,181	121,272	69,537	51,735	17.4	10.0	7.4	1.5	2.39	23.3
1950	7,041,829	115,414	70,296	45,118	16.5	10.0	6.5	1.5	2.28	21.0
1951	7,098,740	110,168	69,799	40,369	15.6	9.9	5.7	2.4	2.20	21.6
1952	7,150,606	110,192	68,270	41,922	15.5	9.6	5.9	1.4	2.22	20.0
1953	7,192,316	110,144	69,553	40,591	15.4	9.7	5.7	0.1	2.25	18.7
1954	7,234,667	105,096	69,030	36,066	14.6	9.6	5.0	0.9	2.18	18.7
1955	7,290,112	107,305	68,634	38,671	14.8	9.5	5.3	2.4	2.25	17.4
1956	7,338,991	107,960	70,205	37,755	14.8	9.6	5.2	1.5	2.29	17.3
1957	7,388,611	107,168	73,132	34,036	14.6	9.9	4.7	2.1	2.29	17.8
1958	7,429,675	105,502	71,065	34,437	14.2	9.6	4.6	1.0	2.26	15.9
1959	7,462,823	104,743	70,889	33,854	14.1	9.5	4.5	0.0	2.29	16.6
1960	7,497,967	102,219	75,093	27,126	13.7	10.0	3.7	1.0	2.17	16.6
1961	7,542,028	104,501	73,555	30,946	13.9	9.8	4.1	1.8	2.21	15.8
1962	7,581,148	107,284	76,791	30,493	14.2	10.2	5.6	-0.4	2.25	15.4
1963	7,627,507	112,903	76,460	36,443	14.8	10.1	4.7	1.4	2.33	15.4
1964	7,695,200	122,664	76,661	46,003	16.0	10.0	6.0	2.9	2.47	14.2
1965	7,772,506	122,806	78,194	44,612	15.9	10.1	5.8	4.2	2.39	13.3
1966	7,843,088	123,354	78,440	44,914	15.8	10.0	5.8	3.3	2.37	12.6
1967	7,892,774	121,360	79,783	41,577	15.4	10.1	5.3	1.0	2.28	12.9
1968	7,931,193	113,087	82,476	30,611	14.3	10.4	3.9	1.0	2.07	13.1
1969	8,004,270	107,622	83,352	24,270	13.5	10.5	3.0	6.2	1.94	11.7
1970	8,081,142	110,150	80,026	30,124	13.7	9.9	3.8	5.8	1.94	11.0
1971	8,115,165	114,484	82,717	31,767	14.1	10.2	3.9	0.3	1.98	11.1
1972	8,129,129	112,273	84,051	28,222	13.8	10.3	3.5	−1.8	1.93	10.8
1973	8,144,428	109,663	85,640	24,023	13.5	10.5	3.0	−1.1	1.88	9.9
1974	8,176,691	109,874	86,316	23,558	13.5	10.6	2.9	1.1	1.91	9.6
1975	8,208,442	103,632	88,208	15,424	12.6	10.8	1.8	2.1	1.78	8.6
1976	8,236,179	98,345	90,677	7,668	12.0	11.0	1.0	2.4	1.70	8.3
1977	8,267,116	96,057	88,202	7,855	11.6	10.7	0.9	2.9	1.64	8.0
1978	8,284,437	93,248	89,681	3,567	11.3	10.8	0.5	1.6	1.61	7.8
1979	8,303,010	96,255	91,074	5,181	11.6	11.0	0.6	1.6	1.66	7.5
1980	8,317,937	97,064	91,800	5,264	11.7	11.0	0.7	1.1	1.69	6.9
1981	8,323,033	94,065	92,034	2,031	11.3	11.1	0.2	0.4	1.63	6.9
1982	8,327,484	92,748	90,671	2,077	11.1	10.9	0.2	0.3	1.60	6.8
1983	8,330,573	91,780	90,791	989	11.0	10.9	0.1	0.3	1.61	7.0
1984	8,342,621	93,889	90,483	3,406	11.3	10.9	0.4	1.0	1.66	6.4
1985	8,358,139	98,463	94,032	4,431	11.8	11.3	0.5	1.4	1.74	6.8
1986	8,381,515	101,950	93,295	8,655	12.2	11.1	1.1	1.7	1.79	5.9
1987	8,414,083	104,699	93,307	11,392	12.5	11.1	1.4	2.5	1.84	6.1
1988	8,458,888	112,080	96,743	15,337	13.3	11.5	1.8	3.5	1.96	5.8
1989	8,527,036	116,023	92,110	23,913	13.7	10.8	2.9	5.2	2.02	5.8
1990	8,590,630	123,938	95,161	28,777	14.5	11.1	3.4	4.1	2.14	6.0
1991	8,644,119	123,737	95,202	28,535	14.4	11.0	3.4	2.8	2.12	6.2
1992	8,692,013	122,848	94,710	28,138	14.2	10.9	3.3	2.2	2.09	5.3
1993	8,745,109	117,998	97,008	20,990	13.5	11.1	2.4	3.7	2.00	4.8
1994	8,816,381	112,257	91,844	20,413	12.8	10.5	2.3	5.8	1.90	4.4
1995	8,837,496	103,326	96,910	6,416	11.7	11.0	0.7	1.7	1.74	4.1
1996	8,844,499	95,297	94,133	1,164	10.8	10.6	0.2	0.6	1.61	4.0
1997	8,847,625	89,171	92,674	−3,503	10.1	10.5	−0.4	0.8	1.52	3.6
1998	8,854,322	88,384	92,891	−4,507	10.0	10.5	−0.5	1.3	1.51	3.5
1999	8,861,426	88,173	94,726	−6,553	10.0	10.7	−0.7	1.5	1.50	3.4
2000	8,882,792	90,441	93,285	−2,844	10.2	10.5	−0.3	2.7	1.54	3.4
2001	8,909,128	91,466	93,752	−2,286	10.3	10.5	−0.2	3.2	1.57	3.7
2002	8,940,788	95,815	95,009	806	10.7	10.6	0.1	3.5	1.65	3.3
2003	8,975,670	99,157	92,961	6,196	11.1	10.4	0.7	3.2	1.71	3.1
2004	9,011,392	100,928	90,532	10,396	11.2	10.1	1.1	2.9	1.75	3.1
2005	9,047,752	101,346	91,710	9,636	11.2	10.2	1.0	3.0	1.77	2.4
2006	9,113,257	105,913	91,177	14,736	11.7	10.0	1.7	5.5	1.85	2.8
2007	9,182,927	107,421	91,729	15,692	11.7	10.0	1.7	5.9	1.88	2.5
2008	9,256,347	109,301	91,449	17,852	11.9	9.9	2.0	6.0	1.91	2.5
2009	9,340,682	111,801	90,080	21,721	12.0	9.7	2.3	6.8	1.93	2.5
2010	9,415,570	115,641	90,487	25,154	12.3	9.6	2.7	5.3	1.985	2.5
2011	9,482,885	111,770	89,938	21,832	11.8	9.5	2.3	4.8	1.901	2.1
2012	9,555,893	113,177	91,938	21,239	11.9	9.7	2.2	5.5	1.906	2.6
2013	9,644,000	113,593	90,402	23,191	11.8	9.4	2.4	6.8	1.888	2.7
2014	9,747,000	114,907	88,976	25,931	11.9	9.2	2.7	8.0	1.881	2.2
2015	9,851,000	114,870	90,907	23,963	11.7	9.3	2.4	8.3	1.849	2.5
2016	9,995,000	117,425	90,982	26,443	11.8	9.2	2.6	12.0	1.853	2.5
2017	10,120,000	115,416	91,972	23,444	11.4	9.1	2.3	10.2	1.779	2.4
2018	10,230,000	115,832	92,185	23,647	11.3	9.0	2.3	8.6	1.752	2.0
2019	10,327,000	114,523	88,766	25,757	11.1	8.6	2.5	7.0	1.705	2.1
2020	10,379,000	113,077	98,124	14,953	10.9	9.5	1.4	3.6	1.664	2.4
2021	10,452,326	114,263	91,958	22,305	10.9	8.8	2.1	4.9	1.669	1.8
2022	10,521,556	104,734	94,737	9,997	10.0	9.0	1.0	5.6	1.521	2.2
2023	10,551,707	100,051	94,385	5,666	9.5	9.0	0.5	2.3	1.449	2.1
2024	10,587,710	98,451	91,268	7,183	9.3	8.6	0.7	2.7	1.430	2.0
2025	10,605,529	97,491	92,212	5,279	9.2	8.7	0.5	1.1	1.423	

In 2021 80,465 (70.4%) babies were born to Swedish-born mothers while 33,798 (29.6%) were born to foreign-born mothers. The total fertility rate for Swedish-born women was 1.62, for foreign-born ones 1.86. In 2022 73,294 (70.0%) babies were born to Swedish-born mothers while 31,440 (30.0%) were born to foreign-born mothers. The total fertility rate for Swedish-born women was 1.47, for foreign-born ones 1.69.

=== Current vital statistics ===
Period	Live births	Deaths	Natural increase
January—September 2025	75,396	68,612	+6,784
January—September 2026	75,978	68,785	+7,193
Difference	▲ +582 (+0.77%)	▲ +173 (+0.25%)	+409

=== Total fertility rates by areas ===
2023
National areas	TFR
Småland and the islands	1.59
Middle Norrland	1.50
West Sweden	1.48
South Sweden	1.48
North Middle Sweden	1.47
East Middle Sweden	1.42
Stockholm	1.40
Upper Norrland	1.38

=== Structure of the population ===
Population Estimates by Sex and Age Group (01.I.2021) (Population statistics are compiled from registers. Data refer to registered resident population.):

Age group	Male	Female	Total	%
Total	5 222 847	5 156 448	10 379 295	100
0–4	305 880	289 196	595 076	5.73
5–9	319 463	300 892	620 355	5.98
10–14	320 338	302 029	622 367	6.00
15–19	298 045	278 531	576 576	5.56
20–24	307 498	271 966	579 464	5.58
25–29	369 377	348 382	717 759	6.92
30–34	378 916	361 033	739 949	7.13
35–39	338 542	320 188	658 730	6.35
40–44	323 615	310 620	634 235	6.11
45–49	338 455	328 772	667 227	6.43
50–54	339 035	329 537	668 572	6.44
55–59	324 658	317 015	641 673	6.18
60–64	285 462	283 764	569 226	5.48
65–69	265 210	271 524	536 734	5.17
70–74	268 233	282 384	550 617	5.30
75–79	219 254	237 761	457 015	4.40
80–84	125 935	155 095	281 030	2.71
85–89	64 699	98 675	163 374	1.57
90–94	24 686	51 690	76 376	0.74
95–99	5 132	15 359	20 491	0.20
100+	414	2 035	2 449	0.02
Age group	Male	Female	Total	Percent
0–14	945 681	892 117	1 837 798	17.71
15–64	3 303 603	3 149 808	6 453 411	62.18
65+	973 563	1 114 523	2 088 086	20.12

== Migration ==
Population pyramid segmented by background. Swedish background in color, foreign background in gray

Prior to World War II, emigrants generally outnumbered immigrants. Since then, net migration has been positive with many immigrants coming to Sweden from the 1970s through today.

=== Emigration ===
Between 1820 and 1930, approximately 1.3 million Swedes, 20% of the male population and 15% of the female population at the time, emigrated to North America, and most of them to the United States. There are more than 4.4 million Swedish Americans according to a 2006 US Census Bureau estimate. In Canada, the community of Swedish ancestry is 330,000 strong.

=== Immigration ===
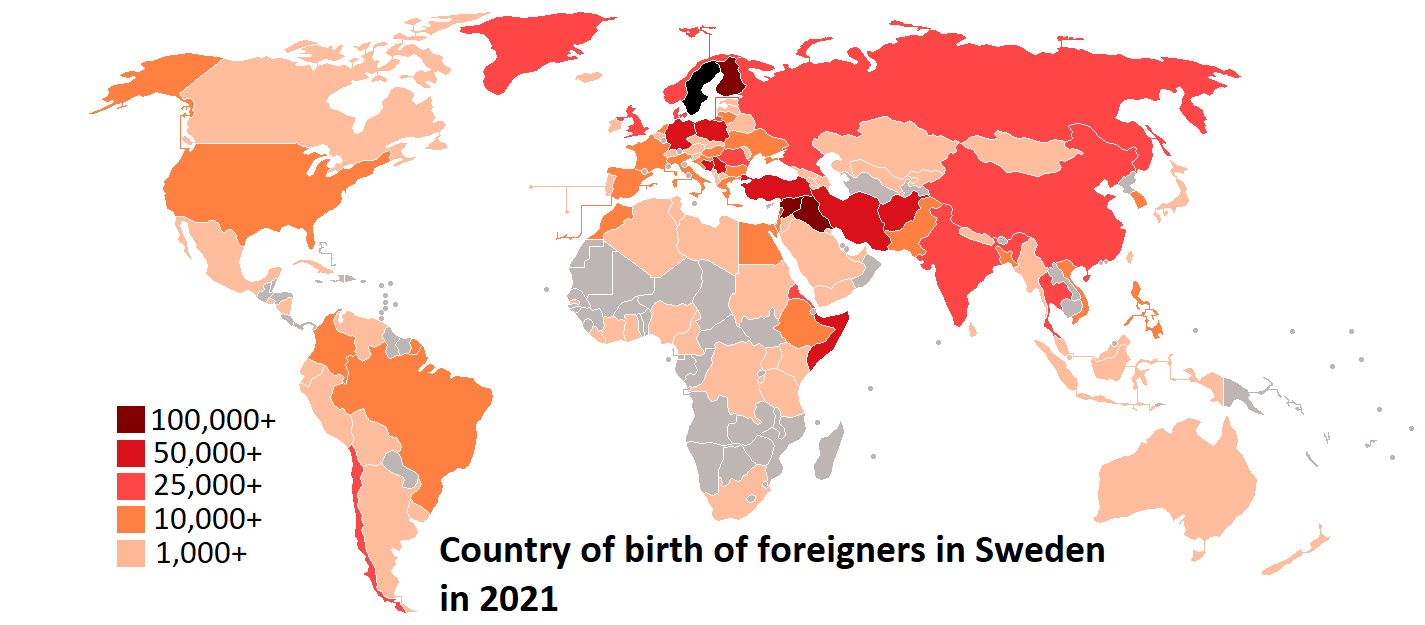

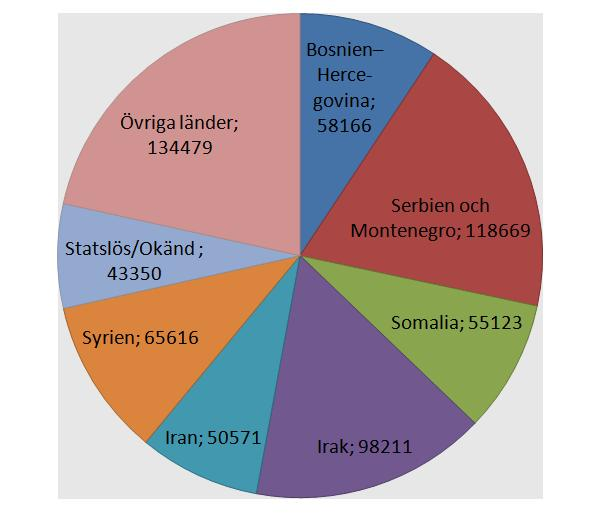
Increases (1984–2014) of asylum in Sweden by origin Serbia and Montenegro: 118 669 Iraq: 98 211 Syria: 65 616 Bosnia-Herzegovina: 58 166 Somalia: 55 123 Iran: 50 571 Other countries: 134 479 Unknown: 43 350 Data source (Swedish government).

The demographic profile of Sweden has altered considerably due to immigration patterns since the 1970s. As of 2020, Statistics Sweden reported that around 2,686,040 or 25.9% of the inhabitants of Sweden were from a foreign background: that is, each such person either had been born abroad or had been born in Sweden to two parents who themselves had both been born abroad. Also taking into account people with only one parent born abroad, this number increases to one third (33.5%).

Additionally, the birth rate among immigrant women after arriving in Sweden is somewhat higher than among ethnic Swedes. Taking into account the fact that immigrant women have on average fewer children than Swedish women of comparable age, however, the difference in total birth rate is only 0.1 children more if the woman is foreign born – with the disclaimer that some women may have children not immigrating to and not reported in Sweden, who are thus not included in the statistics.

==== Historical immigration ====
World War II

Immigration increased markedly with World War II. Historically, the most numerous of foreign born nationalities are ethnic Germans from Germany and other Scandinavians from Denmark and Norway. In short order, 70,000 war children were evacuated from Finland, of which 15,000 remained in Sweden. Also, many of Denmark's nearly 7,000 Jews who were evacuated to Sweden decided to remain there.

A sizeable community from the Baltic countries (Estonia, Latvia and Lithuania) arrived during the Second World War.

1945 to 1967

During the 1950s and 1960s, the recruitment of immigrant labour was an important factor of immigration. The Nordic countries signed a trade agreement in 1952, establishing a common labour market and free movement across borders. This migration within the Nordic countries, especially from Finland, was essential to create the tax-base required for the expansion of the strong public sector now characteristic of Scandinavia. but the influx gave rise to an anti-Finnish sentiment within Sweden and Norway. This continued until 1967, when the labour market became saturated, and Sweden introduced new immigration controls.

On a smaller scale, Sweden took in political refugees from Hungary and the former Czechoslovakia after their countries were invaded by the Soviet Union in 1956 and 1968, respectively.

==== Contemporary immigration ====
Swedish and foreign born population pyramid in 2022

Since the early 1970s, immigration to Sweden has been mostly due to refugee migration and family reunification from countries in the Middle East and Latin America. According to Eurostat, in 2010, there were 1.33 million foreign-born residents in Sweden, corresponding to 14.3% of the total population. Of these, 859,000 (64.3%) were born outside the EU and 477,000 (35.7%) were born in another EU Member State. By comparison, the Swedish civil registry reports, for 2018, that nearly 1.96 million residents are foreign-born, a 47% increase from 2010. There are 8.27 million Swedish-born residents, giving a total population of 10.23 million, and a 19.1% foreign-born population. Malmö, the third largest city of Sweden and Skåne County as a whole have taken in highest numbers of refugees who reached Sweden, in particular during the Yugoslav Wars in the 1990s and the Syrian civil war in the 2010s.

The first group of Assyrians/Syriacs moved to Sweden from Lebanon in 1967. Many of them live in Södertälje (Stockholm). There are also around 40,000 Roma in Sweden. Some Roma people have long historical roots in Sweden, while others are more recent migrants from elsewhere in Europe.

Immigrants from Western Asia have been a rapidly growing share of Sweden's population. According to the government agency Statistics Sweden, the number of immigrants born in all of Asia (including the Middle East) rose from just 1,000 in 1950 to 295,000 in 2003. Most of those immigrants came from Iraq, Iran, Lebanon and Syria, according to Statistics Sweden.

Immigration of Iraqis increased dramatically during the Iraq War, beginning in 2003. A total of 8,951 Iraqis came to Sweden in 2006, accounting for 45% of the entire Iraqi migration to Europe. By 2007, the community of Iraqis in Sweden numbered above 70,000. In 2008, Sweden introduced tighter rules on asylum seekers.

A significant number of Syrian Christians have also settled in Sweden. There have also been immigrants from South-Central Asia such as Afghanistan and India. Since the European migrant crisis, Syrians became the second-largest group of foreign-born persons in the Swedish civil registry in 2017 with 158,443 people (after former Yugoslavia).

Note that the table below lists the citizenship the person had when arriving in Sweden, and therefore there are no registered Eritreans, Russians or Bosnians from 1990, they were recorded as Ethiopians, Soviets and Yugoslavs. The nationality of Yugoslavs below is therefore people who came to Sweden from the Socialist Federal Republic of Yugoslavia before 1991 and people who came from today's Montenegro and Serbia before 2003, then called the Federal Republic of Yugoslavia. Counting all people who came from Slovenia, Croatia, Bosnia and Herzegovina, Serbia, Montenegro, Kosovo, Macedonia, Serbia and Montenegro, the Federal Republic of Yugoslavia and the Socialist Federal Republic of Yugoslavia, there were 176,033 people from there in 2018.

The 49 countries with over 10,000 foreign-born persons in 2024.
Country	1900	1930	1960	1990	2000	2010	2020	2021	2022	2023	2024	2025
Syria	–	–	6	5,874	14,162	20,758	193,594	196,077	197,799	197,201	196,152	194,606
Iraq	–	–	16	9,818	49,372	121,761	146,440	146,769	146,831	145,586	143,160	141,451
(European Union) Finland	6,644	9,746	101,307	217,636	195,447	169,521	140,337	136,607	133,083	129,406	125,904	122,462
(European Union) Poland	–	1,065	6,347	35,631	40,123	70,253	93,762	95,076	98,387	100,706	100,062	98,311
Iran	2	8	115	40,084	51,101	62,120	81,301	83,122	85,488	86,838	87,115	87,292
Somalia	–	–	–	1,441	13,082	37,846	70,184	70,087	69,477	68,290	66,846	65,960
former Federal Republic of Yugoslavia	–	19	1,532	43,346	71,972	70,819	63,419	62,444	61,554	60,636	59,692	58,757
Afghanistan	–	–	17	534	4,287	14,420	60,858	62,803	65,662	67,738	68,164	68,819
Bosnia and Herzegovina	–	–	–	–	51,526	56,183	60,161	60,194	60,265	60,003	59,333	58,749
Turkey	15	22	202	25,528	31,894	42,527	52,628	54,004	55,954	56,871	57,389	57,783
(European Union) Germany	5,107	8,566	37,580	37,558	38,155	48,158	51,434	52,960	55,642	56,969	57,871	58,461
Eritrea	–	–	–	–	3,054	10,301	47,156	48,278	49,213	49,639	49,704	49,740
Thailand	–	–	20	4,934	10,353	31,378	44,339	45,109	45,631	45,940	45,882	46,036
India	45	135	361	9,054	11,110	17,863	42,790	47,369	53,973	58,094	59,290	61,298
Norway	7,978	14,731	37,253	52,744	42,464	43,480	41,062	40,625	40,277	39,951	39,370	38,934
(European Union) Denmark	6,872	8,726	35,112	43,931	38,190	45,548	38,929	38,474	38,070	37,655	37,203	36,708
China (not including Hong Kong)	34	201	520	3,896	8,150	23,998	36,023	37,172	38,461	38,253	38,976	40,338
(European Union) Romania	3	34	719	8,785	11,776	19,741	32,741	33,695	35,565	36,738	36,870	36,681
United Kingdom	779	1,270	2,738	11,378	14,602	20,839	31,035	31,993	32,575	32,916	33,143	33,278
Lebanon	–	–	15	15,986	20,038	24,116	28,885	29,313	29,770	29,876	29,774	29,576
Chile	6	28	69	27,635	26,842	28,387	27,918	27,894	27,869	27,756	27,427	27,186
United States	5,130	8,852	10,874	13,001	14,413	17,179	23,290	24,173	24,970	25,739	25,437	26,285
Russia	1,506	–	–	–	6,523	15,511	22,774	23,455	24,775	25,568	26,529	26,680
Ethiopia	5	–	59	10,027	11,907	13,822	22,125	22,672	23,141	23,363	23,463	23,634
Pakistan	–	–	11	2,291	3,100	10,265	21,172	24,183	27,292	28,614	29,760	32,075
Vietnam	–	–	1	6,265	10,898	14,584	21,126	21,528	21,874	21,983	21,842	21,998
(European Union) Greece	5	22	266	13,171	10,851	11,381	19,737	19,931	20,672	21,237	21,520	21,720
(European Union) Hungary	50	108	8,544	15,045	14,127	15,339	16,480	16,381	16,568	16,900	16,960	16,858
(European Union) Lithuania	–	149	–	233	785	6,735	15,917	16,434	17,396	17,944	17,878	17,566
Serbia	–	–	–	–	–	5,324	15,874	16,719	17,567	17,927	17,909	17,875
Philippines	–	–	5	2,613	5,460	9,826	15,640	16,219	16,790	17,311	17,683	18,153
(European Union) Italy	200	367	4,904	5,989	6,337	7,804	14,155	14,786	15,665	16,397	16,786	17,065
Colombia	–	–	73	4,650	7,317	10,531	13,060	13,411	13,782	14,055	14,217	14,377
(European Union) Spain	30	64	867	4,917	5,079	6,763	12,930	13,409	14,060	14,534	14,681	14,714
(European Union) Netherlands	50	208	2,105	3,543	4,532	8,700	12,769	13,523	14,774	15,772	16,829	18,062
Bangladesh	–	–	–	1,571	2,937	6,289	12,279	12,965	13,904	13,987	14,461	15,427
(European Union) Croatia	–	–	–	–	5,229	6,277	12,207	12,559	13,016	13,204	12,975	12,650
Ukraine	–	–	–	–	1,459	4,741	11,899	12,891	13,937	14,297	41,767	47,960
Morocco	–	–	22	2,720	4,492	7,391	11,898	12,207	12,573	12,823	12,914	12,973
(European Union) France	255	599	1,750	3,844	5,602	7,944	11,854	12,618	13,445	14,006	14,270	14,585
South Korea	–	–	47	8,205	9,170	10,398	11,719	11,795	11,945	11,985	11,968	11,898
Egypt								10,268	10,768	10,866	10,979	11,108
North Macedonia									10,653	11,131	11,195	11,162
(European Union) Bulgaria								10,052	10,427	10,741	10,685	10,563
(European Union) Latvia									10,323	11,154	11,362	11,327
Kosovo	–	–	–	–	–	2,288	11,164	11,920	12,605	12,913	12,891	12,915
Brazil	41	92	175	2,118	3,496	6,005	10,725	11,680	12,832	13,305	13,439	13,651
Albania										10,453	10,763	11,065
Sri Lanka										10,420	11,380	12,117
Total	35,627	61,657	299,879	790,445	1,003,798	1,384,929	2,046,731					

=== Migration data of Sweden (2000–present) ===
Year	Immigration	Emigration	Net Migration	Swedish nationals Immigration	Swedish nationals Emigration	Swedish nationals Net Migration
2000	58,659	34,091	24,568	16,030	21,515	−5,485
2001	60,795	32,141	28,654	16,678	19,439	−2,761
2002	64,087	33,009	31,078	16,484	18,813	−2,329
2003	63,795	35,023	28,772	15,807	19,889	−4,082
2004	62,028	36,586	25,442	14,448	20,565	−6,117
2005	65,229	38,118	27,111	13,932	22,266	−8,334
2006	95,750	44,908	50,842	15,352	24,875	−9,523
2007	99,485	45,418	54,067	15,949	24,990	−9,041
2008	101,171	45,294	55,877	17,853	26,052	−8,199
2009	102,280	39,240	63,040	18,517	20,883	−2,366
2010	98,801	48,853	49,948	19,765	26,792	−7,027
2011	96,467	51,179	45,288	20,615	27,506	−6,891
2012	103,059	51,747	51,312	20,462	25,116	−4,654
2013	115,845	50,715	65,130	20,484	26,112	−5,628
2014	126,966	51,237	75,729	20,866	24,861	−3,995
2015	134,240	55,830	78,410	20,372	24,497	−4,125
2016	163,005	45,878	117,127	20,019	22,425	−2,406
2017	144,489	45,620	98,869	19,513	22,248	−2,735
2018	132,602	46,981	85,621	18,171	22,884	−4,713
2019	115,805	47,718	68,087	17,570	22,407	−4,837
2020	82,518	48,937	33,581	16,729	22,195	−5,466
2021	90,631	48,284	42,347	16,005	25,443	−9,438
2022	102,436	50,592	51,844	15,705	29,892	−14,187
2023	94,514	73,434	21,080	17,228	37,508	−20,280
2024	116,197	86,449	29,748	18,916	39,550	−20,634

== Language ==
The Swedish language is the official and by far the dominating language in Sweden, and is used by the government administration. English is also widely spoken and is taught in public schools.

Since 1999, Sweden has five officially recognised minority languages: Sámi, Meänkieli, Finnish, Romani and Yiddish.

The Sámi languages, spoken by about 20,000–30,000 people worldwide, may be used in government agencies, courts, preschools and nursing homes in 26 municipalities: Arjeplog, Arvidsjaur, Berg, Dorotea, Gällivare, Härjedalen, Jokkmokk, Kiruna, Krokom, Luleå, Lycksele, Malå, Sorsele, Skellefteå, Stockholm, Storuman, Strömsund, Sundsvall, Umeå, Vilhelmina, Vindeln, Åre, Åsele, Älvdalen, Örnsköldsvik and Östersund.

Meänkieli-speakers have the same rights as above in the following nine municipalities: Gällivare, Haparanda, Kiruna, Pajala, Övertorneå, Kalix, Luleå, Stockholm and Umeå.

Finnish-speakers have the same rights as above in 66 of Sweden's 290 municipalities.

During the mid to late 20th and early 21st centuries, immigrant communities brought other languages, such as Persian, Serbo-Croatian, Arabic and Neo-Aramaic.

== Religion ==
The majority (52.1%) of the population belongs to the Church of Sweden, the Lutheran church that was disestablished as a state church in 2000. Until 1996, those who had family members in the church automatically became members at birth. Other Christian denominations in Sweden include the Roman Catholic Church (see Catholic Church in Sweden), several Orthodox churches in diaspora, Baptist, Pentecostal, Neo-pietistic (nyevangeliska) and other evangelical Christian churches (frikyrkor = 'free churches'). Shamanism persisted among the Sámi people up until the 18th century, but no longer exists in its traditional form as most Sámi today belong to the Lutheran church.

Jews were permitted to practice their religion in five Swedish cities in 1782, and have enjoyed full rights as citizens since 1870. The new Freedom of Religion Bill was passed in 1951, and former obstacles against Non-Lutherans working in schools and hospitals were removed. Further, that bill made it legal to leave any religious denomination, without entering another. There are also many Muslims, as well as a number of Buddhists and Baháʼís in Sweden, mainly as a result of 20th and 21st century immigration. There is also a small Zoroastrian community in Sweden.

== Homelessness ==
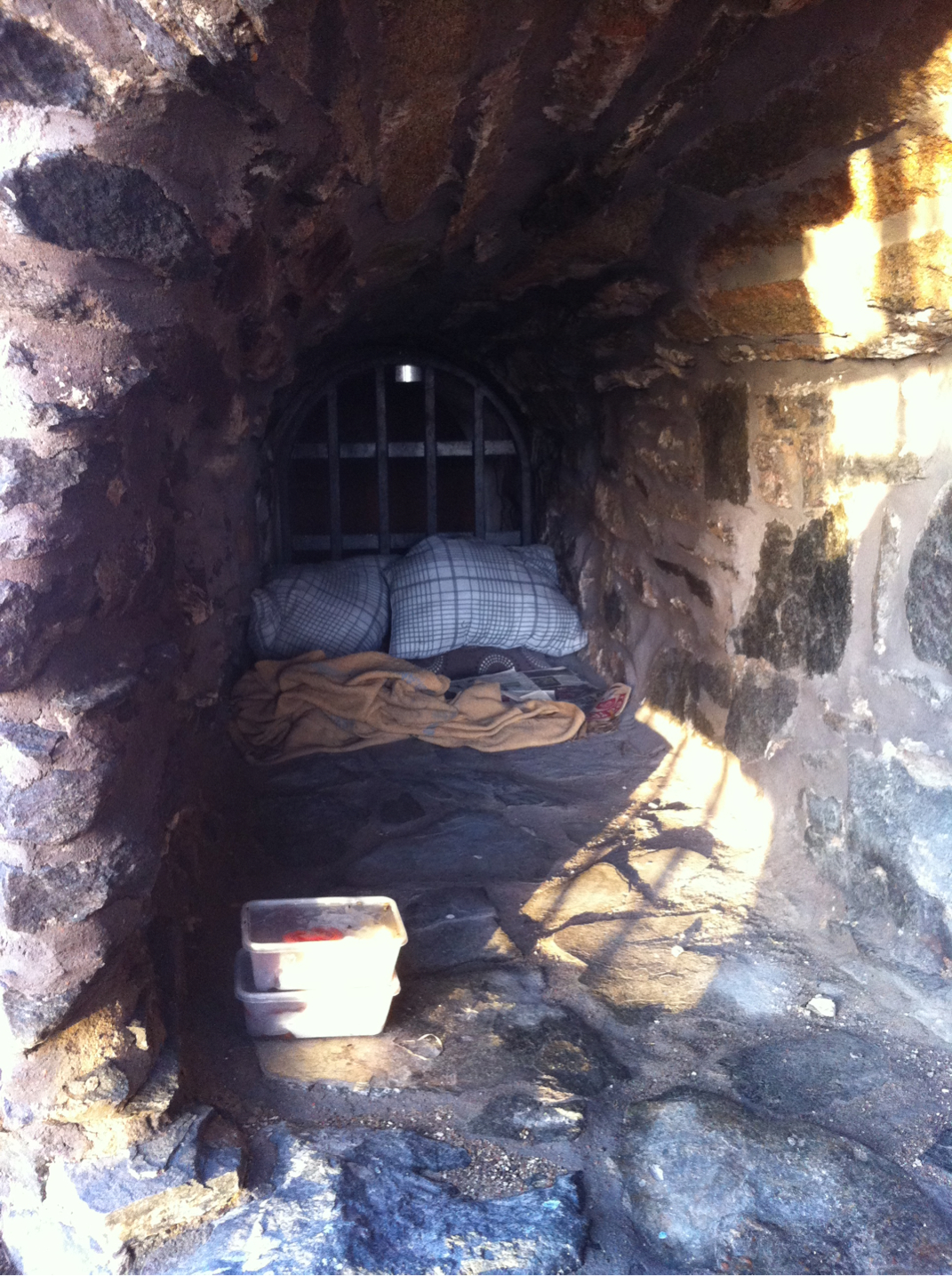
A homeless person's bed in Gothenburg, Sweden, 2013.

Homelessness in Sweden affects around 27,000 people.

The Swedish government's response to homelessness has included commissioning national surveys on homelessness during the last decade that allow for direct comparison between Sweden, Denmark and Norway. The three countries have very similar definitions of homelessness, with minor variations.

Some researchers maintain that measures to counteract homelessness in Sweden are largely dependent on a general premise equating homelessness with addiction, mental illness and deviance. On the other hand, youth homelessness is considered a child protection problem.

== See also ==
- Statistics Sweden
- Municipalities of Sweden
- Demographical center of Sweden
- Immigration to Europe
- List of countries by immigrant population
- Aging of Europe
- List of Swedish counties by fertility rate
