= Stockholm (national area) =

- National area
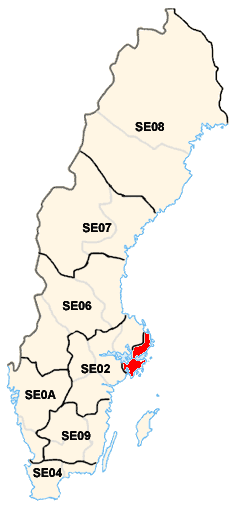
- Country: Sweden
- Largest city: Stockholm
- ISO 3166 code: SE01

Stockholm is a national area (riksområde) of Sweden. The national areas are a part of the Nomenclature of Territorial Units for Statistics (NUTS) of Sweden.

== Geography ==
The area corresponds to that of Stockholm County. It borders the riksområde of East Middle Sweden.

== See also ==
- Stockholm County
- Riksområden
- NUTS of Sweden
- Local administrative unit
- ISO 3166-2:SE
- Municipalities of Stockholm County
