= Län =

Administrative divisions used in Sweden and previously in Denmark, Finland and Norway

Län of Sweden: (AB) Stockholm County; (C) Uppsala County; (D) Södermanland County; (E) Östergötland County; (F) Jönköping County; (G) Kronoberg County; (H) Kalmar County; (I) Gotland County; (K) Blekinge County; (M) Skåne County; (N) Halland County; (O) Västra Götaland County; (S) Värmland County; (T) Örebro County; (U) Västmanland County; (W) Dalarna County; (X) Gävleborg County; (Y) Västernorrland County; (Z) Jämtland County; (AC) Västerbotten County; (BD) Norrbotten County

Län (Swedish, IPA: [ˈlɛːn]), len (Danish, IPA: [leːn]), lääni (Finnish, IPA: [ˈlæːni]) and len (Norwegian, IPA: [leːn]) (all known as leatna in Northern Sámi) refer to the administrative divisions used in Sweden and previously in Denmark, Finland and Norway. The provinces of Finland were abolished on 1 January 2010. In Norway, the term was in use from 1308 and in Denmark from the beginning of the 13th century. As of 19 February 1662 the len of Denmark-Norway were converted into amt.

They are also sometimes used in other countries, especially as a translation of the Russian word volost. During the period when Finland was a part of the Russian Empire (1809–1917), when Russian was made an official language alongside Swedish, it was synonymous with the word guberniya.

== The term ==
The word literally means "fief" and is cognate with English loan. The usual English language terms used are separate for the two countries, where Sweden has chosen to translate the term as "county" while Finland prefers "province". With a shared administrative tradition spanning centuries, ending only in 1809, this is a separation by convention, rather than by distinction.

The term matches reasonably well the British term "county", but not so well the American term "county" which is usually much smaller in population, akin to a Swedish "kommun", nor does the concept of an American state compare well to län.

Before län were adopted, the historical provinces were defined as either "hertigdöme" (duchy) or "grevskap" (county), which adds further confusion. Later all historical provinces have been termed "hertigdömen" (duchies) as honorary titles.

== The län ==
In Sweden a län is but an arm of the executive power of the national government, and has no autonomy nor legislative power. The län subdivision does not always match the traditional provinces, which are called landskap (singular and plural) in Swedish (including Swedish-speaking Finland) and maakunnat (singular maakunta) in Finnish. The same situation existed in Finland until län/lääni were abolished in 2010.

- Counties of Sweden (Sveriges län)
- Provinces of Finland (Suomen läänit / Finlands län, abolished 2010)

Historically the term guberniya (Russian: губе́рния) was used for the län/lääni in the Grand Duchy of Finland as a part of Russia from 1809 to 1917. See Governorates of the Grand Duchy of Finland.

== The landsting ==
In every Swedish län (except Gotland) there was a landsting. This was a locally elected assembly, which collected tax and had responsibility for a number of services to the population. The main responsibilities were health care, public transport and culture. As of 2020, the landsting have been replaced by regions.

== The landshövding ==
The governor has the title landshövding (Swedish) (previously maaherra in Finnish). The governor is appointed by the government, and presides over the länsstyrelse (Swedish; previously lääninhallitus in Finnish) – translated as "County Administrative Board". The governor's office is administrative by nature, which is also hinted at by the now obsolete title Konungens befallningshavande – "the King's Deputy" – and traditionally used as an honourable post for politicians to conclude their careers. In Finland, the office of governor was abolished in 2010. However, the office still exists in the autonomous province of Åland. The governor of a Swedish county is appointed to represent the central government, rather than elected by the people.

== See also ==
- Subdivisions of the Nordic countries
- Counties of Sweden
- Counties of Denmark
- Counties of Finland
- Counties of Norway
