= North Middle Sweden =

North Middle Sweden Norra Mellansverige
- National area
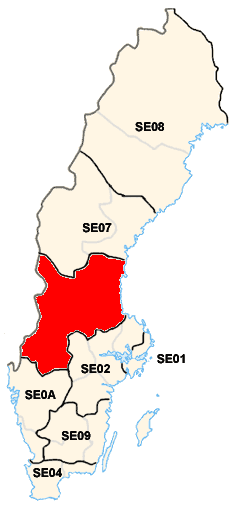
- Country: Sweden
- Largest city: Gävle

Area
  - Total: 63,968 km^{2} (24,698 sq mi)

Population
  - Total: 858,063
  - Density: 13.414/km^{2} (34.742/sq mi)

GDP
  - Total: €34.528 billion (2024)
  - Per capita: €40,431 (2024)
- ISO 3166 code: SE06

North Middle Sweden (Swedish: Norra Mellansverige) is a national area (riksområde) of Sweden. The national areas are a part of the NUTS statistical regions of Sweden.

== Geography ==
The region is situated in the central part of the country, partly located in Norrland and mainly in Svealand. It borders with Norway and the riksområden of Middle Norrland, West Sweden and East Middle Sweden.

The most populous cities are Gävle, Karlstad, Borlänge, Falun, Sandviken, Kristinehamn, Hudiksvall, Avesta, Ludvika and Arvika.

== Subdivision ==
North Middle Sweden includes 3 counties:

- Dalarna (seat: Falun)
- Gävleborg (seat: Gävle)
- Värmland (seat: Karlstad)

== Economy ==
The Gross domestic product (GDP) of the region was 35.725 billion € in 2021, accounting for 6.8% of Swedish economic output. GDP per capita adjusted for purchasing power was 29,700 € or 98% of the EU27 average in the same year. The GDP per employee was 102% of the EU average.

== See also ==
- Svealand
- Norrland
- Riksområden
- NUTS of Sweden
- ISO 3166-2:SE
- Local administrative unit
- Subdivisions of Norden
