= West Sweden =

West Sweden Västsverige
- National area
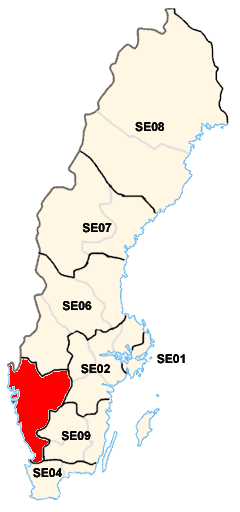
- Country: Sweden
- Largest city: Gothenburg

Area
  - Total: 29,399 km^{2} (11,351 sq mi)

Population
  - Total: 2,071,191
  - Density: 70.451/km^{2} (182.47/sq mi)

GDP
  - Total: €101.340 billion (2021)
- ISO 3166 code: SE0A

West Sweden (Swedish: Västsverige or Västra Sverige) is a national area (riksområde) of Sweden. The national areas are a part of the NUTS statistical regions of Sweden.

== Geography ==
It is located in the south-west of the country, centered on Västra Götaland County and the city of Gothenburg. After Stockholm it is the second most populated region. It borders with Norway and the riksområden of North Middle Sweden, East Middle Sweden, Småland and the islands and South Sweden.

The most populous cities are Gothenburg, Borås, Halmstad, Vänersborg, Uddevalla, Trollhättan, Mölndal, Skövde, Varberg, Kungsbacka and Lidköping.

== Subdivision ==
West Sweden includes 2 counties:

- Halland (seat: Halmstad)
- Västra Götaland (seat: Gothenburg)

== Economy ==
The Gross domestic product (GDP) of the region was 101 billion € in 2021, accounting for almost fifth of Swedish economic output. GDP per capita adjusted for purchasing power was 36,000 € or 119% of the EU27 average in the same year. The GDP per employee was 109% of the EU average.

== See also ==
- Greater Göteborg
- Götaland
- Riksområden
- NUTS of Sweden
- ISO 3166-2:SE
- Local administrative unit
- Subdivisions of Norden
