= Småland and the islands =

Småland and the islands Småland och öarna
- National area
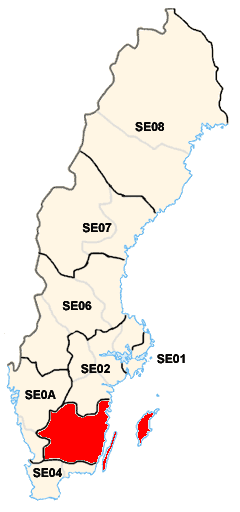
- Country: Sweden
- Largest city: Jönköping

Area
  - Total: 33,244 km^{2} (12,836 sq mi)

Population (2021)
  - Total: 873,407
  - Density: 26.273/km^{2} (68.046/sq mi)

GDP
  - Total: €37.886 billion (2021)
- ISO 3166 code: SE09

Småland and the islands (Swedish: Småland och öarna) is a national area (riksområde) of Sweden. The national areas are a part of the NUTS statistical regions of Sweden. The name derives from the fact that the area covers most of the historical province of Småland with the island provinces of Öland and Gotland, located in the Baltic Sea.

== Geography ==
The Småland and the islands area is situated in the south-eastern part of Sweden. It is close to Denmark and it borders the riksområden of East Middle Sweden, West Sweden and South Sweden.

The most populous cities are Jönköping, Växjö, Kalmar, Visby, Västervik and Värnamo.

== Economy ==
The Gross domestic product (GDP) of the region was 37.886 billion € in 2021, accounting for 7.4% of Swedish economic output. GDP per capita adjusted for purchasing power was 32,100 € or 106% of the EU27 average in the same year. The GDP per employee was 99% of the EU average.

== Subdivision ==
Småland and the islands includes 4 counties:

Counties	NUTS 3	Municipalities	LAU 2
Jönköping (seat: Jönköping)	SE091	Aneby	0604
Jönköping (seat: Jönköping)	SE091	Gnosjö	0617
Jönköping (seat: Jönköping)	SE091	Mullsjö	0642
Jönköping (seat: Jönköping)	SE091	Habo	0643
Jönköping (seat: Jönköping)	SE091	Gislaved	0662
Jönköping (seat: Jönköping)	SE091	Vaggeryd	0665
Jönköping (seat: Jönköping)	SE091	Jönköping	0680
Jönköping (seat: Jönköping)	SE091	Nässjö	0682
Jönköping (seat: Jönköping)	SE091	Värnamo	0683
Jönköping (seat: Jönköping)	SE091	Sävsjö	0684
Jönköping (seat: Jönköping)	SE091	Vetlanda	0685
Jönköping (seat: Jönköping)	SE091	Eksjö	0686
Jönköping (seat: Jönköping)	SE091	Tranås	0687
Kronoberg (seat: Växjö)	SE092	Uppvidinge	0760
Kronoberg (seat: Växjö)	SE092	Lessebo	0761
Kronoberg (seat: Växjö)	SE092	Tingsryd	0763
Kronoberg (seat: Växjö)	SE092	Alvesta	0764
Kronoberg (seat: Växjö)	SE092	Älmhult	0765
Kronoberg (seat: Växjö)	SE092	Markaryd	0767
Kronoberg (seat: Växjö)	SE092	Växjö	0780
Kronoberg (seat: Växjö)	SE092	Ljungby	0781
Kalmar (seat: Kalmar)	SE093	Högsby	0821
Kalmar (seat: Kalmar)	SE093	Torsås	0834
Kalmar (seat: Kalmar)	SE093	Mörbylånga	0840
Kalmar (seat: Kalmar)	SE093	Hultsfred	0860
Kalmar (seat: Kalmar)	SE093	Mönsterås	0861
Kalmar (seat: Kalmar)	SE093	Emmaboda	0862
Kalmar (seat: Kalmar)	SE093	Kalmar	0880
Kalmar (seat: Kalmar)	SE093	Nybro	0881
Kalmar (seat: Kalmar)	SE093	Oskarshamn	0882
Kalmar (seat: Kalmar)	SE093	Västervik	0883
Kalmar (seat: Kalmar)	SE093	Vimmerby	0884
Kalmar (seat: Kalmar)	SE093	Borgholm	0885
Gotland (seat: Visby)	SE094	Gotland	0980

== See also ==
- Götaland
- Riksområden
- NUTS of Sweden
- Local administrative unit
- ISO 3166-2:SE
- Subdivisions of the Nordic countries
- Municipalities of Jönköping County
- Municipalities of Kronoberg County
- Municipalities of Kalmar County
- Municipalities of Gotland County
