= East Middle Sweden =

East Middle Sweden Östra Mellansverige
- National area
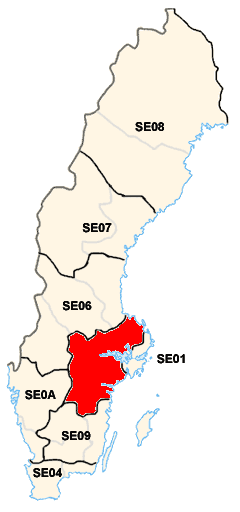
- Coordinates: 59°00′50″N 16°16′19″E
- Country: Sweden
- Largest city: Uppsala

Area
  - Total: 38,120 km^{2} (14,720 sq mi)

Population
  - Total: 1,737,737
  - Density: 45.59/km^{2} (118.1/sq mi)

GDP
  - Total: €76.258 billion (2021)
- ISO 3166 code: SE02

East Middle Sweden (Swedish: Östra Mellansverige) is a national area (riksområde) of Sweden. The national areas are a part of the NUTS statistical regions of Sweden.

== Geography ==
The region is situated in the central part of the Sweden, close to the county and the metropolitan area of Stockholm. It borders with the riksområden of North Middle Sweden, West Sweden, Småland and the islands and Stockholm.

The most populous cities are Uppsala, Västerås, Örebro, Linköping, Norrköping, Eskilstuna, Nyköping, Motala, Enköping and Katrineholm.

== Subdivision ==
East Middle Sweden includes 5 counties:

- Örebro (seat: Örebro)
- Östergötland (seat: Linköping)
- Södermanland (seat: Nyköping)
- Uppsala (seat: Uppsala)
- Västmanland (seat: Västerås)

== Economy ==
The Gross domestic product (GDP) of the region was 76.258 billion € in 2021, accounting for 14.5% of Swedish economic output. GDP per capita adjusted for purchasing power was €31,500 or 106% of the EU27 average in the same year. The GDP per employee was also 106% of the EU average.

== See also ==
- Svealand
- Riksområden
- NUTS of Sweden
- ISO 3166-2:SE
- Local administrative unit
- Subdivisions of Norden
