= South Sweden =

Coordinates: 55.9349°N 14.2530°E

South Sweden Sydsverige
- National area
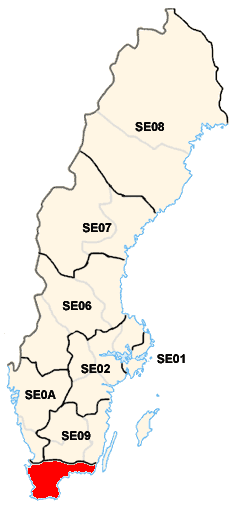
- Country: Sweden
- Largest city: Malmö

Area
  - Total: 13,968 km^{2} (5,393 sq mi)

Population
  - Total: 1,548,392
  - Density: 110.85/km^{2} (287.11/sq mi)

GDP
  - Total: €68.460 billion (2021)
- ISO 3166 code: SE04

South Sweden (Swedish: Sydsverige) is a subdivision of Sweden as defined by the Nomenclature of Territorial Units for Statistics (NUTS). It is classified as a NUTS-1 statistical region of Sweden. It encompasses an area of 13,968 km^{2} (5,393 sq mi), and is the second smallest sub-division in Sweden. It incorporates two counties–Blekinge and Skåne.

== Sub-division ==
The country of Sweden is organized into eight national areas, which are the primary sub-divisions of the country. These are further divided into 21 regions. For statistical purposes, the Nomenclature of Territorial Units for Statistics (NUTS) organizes the country into three broader level sub-divisions based on cardinal directions. These are classified as a NUTS-1 statistical regions of Sweden, and incorporate various regions within it. South Sweden incorporates two counties–Blekinge and Skåne.

== Geography ==
South Sweden covers southern most land area of the country. It is situated close to Denmark and borders the Småland and the islands and West Sweden. The region encompasses an area of 13,968 km^{2} (5,393 sq mi), and is the second smallest non-national sub-division in Sweden. It had a population of over 1.5 million in 2024. Majority of the region consists of plain lands. The region has a temperate climate and the climate becomes relatively warmer moving towards the south despite its location close to the Arctic Circle due to the effect of North Atlantic Current.

== Economy ==
The Gross domestic product (GDP) of the region was 68.460 billion euros in 2021, and accounted for 12.6% of Swedish economic output. GDP per capita adjusted for purchasing power was 31,100 € or 103% of the European union average in the same year. The GDP per employee was also 103% of the EU average.

== See also ==
- Greater Malmö
- Götaland
- NUTS statistical regions of Sweden
- ISO 3166-2:SE
- Administrative divisions of Sweden
