= Middle Norrland =

Middle Norrland Mellersta Norrland
- National area
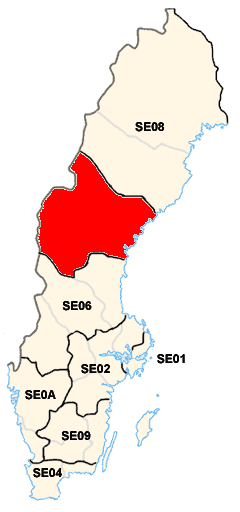
- Country: Sweden
- Largest city: Sundsvall

Area
  - Total: 71,122 km^{2} (27,460 sq mi)

Population
  - Total: 375,709
  - Density: 5.2826/km^{2} (13.682/sq mi)

GDP
  - Total: €17.686 billion (2024)
  - Per capita: €47,289 (2024)
- ISO 3166 code: SE07

Middle Norrland (Swedish: Mellersta Norrland) is a national area (riksområde) of Sweden. The national areas are a part of the NUTS statistical regions of Sweden.

== Geography ==
The region is situated in the north of the county, partly in the area of Sápmi. It is the second for extension and the lesser populated. It borders with Norway and the riksområden of Upper Norrland and North Middle Sweden.

The most populous cities are Sundsvall, Östersund, Örnsköldsvik and Härnösand.

== Subdivision ==
Middle Norrland includes 2 counties:

- Jämtland (seat: Östersund)
- Västernorrland (seat: Härnösand)

== Economy ==
The Gross domestic product (GDP) of the region was 17.0 billion € in 2021, accounting for 3.2% of Swedish economic output. GDP per capita adjusted for purchasing power was 29,700 € or 105% of the EU27 average in the same year. The GDP per employee was 102% of the EU average.

== See also ==
- Sápmi
- Norrland
- Riksområden
- NUTS of Sweden
- ISO 3166-2:SE
- Local administrative unit
- Subdivisions of Norden
