= Nordland (disambiguation) =

Nordland may refer to:

== Places ==
- Nordland, a county in Norway
- Nordlandet, an island in Kristiansund, Norway
- Nordland, Nordland, a village in the island municipality of Værøy in Nordland county, Norway
- Nordland, Washington, a community in the United States
- Nordland Township (disambiguation), the name of several townships in the United States
- Northern Norway, a geographical region in Norway

== Fiction ==
- Nordland (Warhammer), a province in the land of "The Empire" in the Warhammer Fantasy setting
- The land occupied by the Norts in the Rogue Trooper fictional scenario

== Music ==
- Nordland (band), a 1980s Danish pop band
- Nordland (Swiss band), a 1980s Swiss new wave band
- Nordland I and Nordland II, albums by the Swedish Viking metal band Bathory

== Ships ==
- Nordland, a German gunnery training ship from 1944 to 1945, formerly the Danish coastal defence ship HDMS Niels Juel
- FV Nordland a German fishing trawler in service 1922–39, and 1939–40
- V 401 Nordland a Vorpostenboot in service in 1939
- V 411 Nordland a Vorpostenboot in service in 1939
- HMS Nordland, a Royal Navy salvage boat in service 1940–48

== Other ==
- Nordland (boat), a type of fishing boat used in northern Norway
- Nordland (magazine), a Nazi publication in Sweden
- SS Division Nordland, a Waffen-SS unit
- Nordland Line, a railway line in Northern Norway

== See also ==
- Norrland
