= Ranked list of Swedish counties =

Ranked lists of the Counties of Sweden.

== By population (2023) ==
Rank	County	Population	%	Density
1	Stockholm	2,454,821	23.3%	374.6
2	Västra Götaland	1,767,016	16.7%	73.9
3	Skåne	1,421,781	13.5%	129
4	Östergötland	472,298	4.5%	44.7
5	Uppsala	404,589	3.8%	48.9
6	Jönköping	368,856	3.5%	35.4
7	Halland	343,746	3.3%	63.2
8	Örebro	308,116	2.9%	36.2
9	Södermanland	301,944	2.9%	49.8
10	Dalarna	287,253	2.7%	10.3
11	Gävleborg	285,642	2.7%	15.9
12	Värmland	283,548	2.7%	16.2
13	Västmanland	280,813	2.7%	54.9
14	Västerbotten	278,729	2.6%	5.1
15	Norrbotten	248,480	2.4%	2.6
16	Kalmar	246,667	2.3%	22.2
17	Västernorrland	242,148	2.3%	11.3
18	Kronoberg	203,686	1.9%	24.3
19	Blekinge	157,973	1.5%	54.2
20	Jämtland	132,572	1.3%	2.7
21	Gotland	61,029	0.6%	19.5
	Sweden	10,551,707	100.0%	25.8

== By area ==
Rank	County	Area (km²)	%	Density
1	Norrbotten	98,911	24.1%	2.6
2	Västerbotten	55,401	13.5%	4.6
3	Jämtland	49,444	12.0%	2.6
4	Dalarna	28,194	6.9%	10.0
5	Västra Götaland	23,945	5.8%	62.2
6	Västernorrland	21,678	5.3%	11.5
7	Gävleborg	18,191	4.4%	15.4
8	Värmland	17,583	4.3%	15.2
9	Kalmar	11,171	2.7%	21.2
10	Skåne	11,027	2.7%	104.8
11	Östergötland	10,562	2.6%	38.9
12	Jönköping	10,475	2.5%	31.2
13	Örebro	8,519	2.1%	32.1
14	Kronoberg	8,458	2.1%	20.9
15	Uppsala	6,989	1.7%	42.1
16	Stockholm	6,488	1.6%	278.0
17	Västmanland	6,302	1.5%	40.8
18	Södermanland	6,061	1.5%	42.2
19	Halland	5,454	1.3%	50.2
20	Gotland	3,140	0.8%	18.2
21	Blekinge	2,941	0.7%	51.2
	Sweden	410,934	100.0%	21.6

== By density ==
Rank	County	Population	Area (km²)	Density
1	Stockholm	1,803,377	6,488	278.0
2	Skåne	1,156,070	11,027	104.8
3	Västra Götaland	1,488,709	23,945	62.2
4	Blekinge	150,625	2,941	51.2
5	Halland	273,537	5,454	50.2
6	Södermanland	255,890	6,061	42.2
7	Uppsala	294,415	6,989	42.1
8	Västmanland	256,901	6,302	40.8
9	Östergötland	411,320	10,562	38.9
10	Örebro	273,822	8,519	32.1
11	Jönköping	327,266	10,475	31.2
12	Kalmar	236,501	11,171	21.2
13	Kronoberg	177,149	8,458	20.9
14	Gotland	57,248	3,140	18.2
15	Gävleborg	280,717	18,191	15.4
16	Värmland	267,600	17,583	15.2
17	Västernorrland	249,299	21,678	11.5
18	Dalarna	280,575	28,194	10.0
19	Västerbotten	256,710	55,401	4.6
20	Jämtland	130,705	49,444	2.6
21	Norrbotten	258,904	98,911	2.6
	Sweden	8,887,340	410,934	21.6
