= Upper Norrland =

Upper Norrland Övre Norrland
- National area
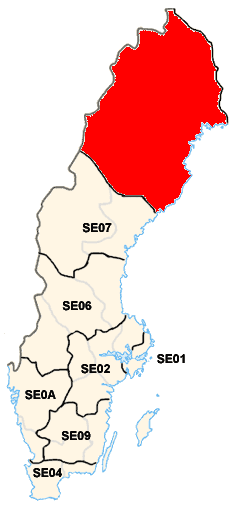
- Coordinates: 65.925°N 18.8°E
- Country: Sweden
- Largest city: Umeå

Area
  - Total: 154,312 km^{2} (59,580 sq mi)

Population
  - Total: 522,806
  - Density: 3.38798/km^{2} (8.77483/sq mi)

GDP
  - Total: €27.911 billion (2021)
- ISO 3166 code: SE08

Upper Norrland (Swedish: Övre Norrland) is a national area (riksområde) of Sweden. The national areas are a part of the NUTS statistical regions of Sweden.

== Geography ==
Övre Norrland is the northernmost region of Sweden and forms part of Sápmi (Lapland). It is the Sweden's largest region by area. It borders Norway, Finland, and the riksområde of Middle Norrland.

The most populous cities are Umeå, Luleå, Skellefteå, Piteå and Boden.

== Subdivision ==
Upper Norrland includes 2 counties:

- Norrbotten (seat: Luleå)
- Västerbotten (seat: Umeå)

== Economy ==
The Gross domestic product (GDP) of the region was 27.911 billion € in 2021, accounting for 4.9% of Swedish economic output. GDP per capita adjusted for purchasing power was €35,100 or 116% of the EU27 average in the same year. The GDP per employee was 109% of the EU average.

== See also ==
- Sápmi
- Norrland
- Riksområden
- NUTS of Sweden
- ISO 3166-2:SE
- Local administrative unit
- Subdivisions of Norden
