= Norland, Virginia =

Unincorporated community in Virginia, United States

Coordinates: 37°09′51″N 82°31′28″W

Norland is an unincorporated community in Dickenson County, Virginia, United States.

== History ==
A post office was established at Norland in 1902, and remained in operation until it was discontinued in 1950. Norland might be short for "north land".
