= Nordland Township =

Nordland Township may refer to:

- Nordland Township, Aitkin County, Minnesota
- Nordland Township, Lyon County, Minnesota
- Nordland Township, Marshall County, South Dakota, in Marshall County, South Dakota
