= Counties of Sweden =

Administrative subdivisions of Sweden

Counties of Sweden Sveriges län (Swedish)
- Category: Unitary state
- Location: Sweden
- Number: 21
- Populations: Least: Gotland, 61,001; Most: Stockholm, 2,415,139
- Areas: Smallest: Blekinge, 2946.4 km^{2} Largest: Norrbotten, 98244.8 km^{2}
- Government: Administrative board; Regional council
- Subdivisions: Municipality

The counties of Sweden (Swedish: Sveriges län, pronounced [ˈsvæ̂rjɛs lɛːn]) are the first-level administrative subdivisions of Sweden. There are twenty-one counties; however, the number of counties has varied over time, due to territorial changes and to divisions or mergers of existing counties.

This level of administrative unit was first established in the 1634 Instrument of Government on Lord Chancellor Count Axel Oxenstierna's initiative, and superseded the landskap, in order to introduce a more efficient administration of the realm. The county borders often follow the provincial borders, but the Crown often chose to make slight relocations to suit its purposes.

In every county there is a county administrative board (länsstyrelse) headed by a governor (landshövding), appointed by the government, as well as a separate regional council (region). In the county of Gotland however, the county's only municipality has adopted regional responsibilities. The aims of the county administrative board are to supervise local state administration (that is not otherwise assigned to other government agencies), and to coordinate political goals with the central government. The regional council is the elected regional political assembly that oversees the municipal affairs of the county, primarily in regard to public healthcare, public transport, and culture.

Beginning in the 2000s, many major government agencies have reorganised from a county-based subdivisional structure into larger geographical or functional areas. This include the Swedish Tax Agency (1 January 2004), the Swedish Social Insurance Agency (1 January 2005), the Swedish Public Employment Service (1 January 2008), and the Swedish Police Authority (1 January 2015).

== List of counties ==
ISO	NUTS	CoA	County (Län)	Administrative centre	Governor	Area		Population (2021-12-31)	Density	
ISO	NUTS	CoA	County (Län)	Administrative centre	Governor	km^{2}	sq mi	Population (2021-12-31)	per km^{2}	per sq mi
SE-AB	SE110		Stockholm	Stockholm	Cecilia Skingsley	6,519.3	2,517.1	2,415,139	370	960
SE-C	SE121		Uppsala	Uppsala	Stefan Attefall	8,207.2	3,168.8	395,026	48.1	125
SE-D	SE122		Södermanland	Nyköping	Johanna Sandwall (acting)	6,102.3	2,356.1	301,801	49.5	128
SE-E	SE123		Östergötland	Linköping	Gunilla Svantorp	10,602.0	4,093.5	469,704	44.3	115
SE-F	SE211		Jönköping	Jönköping	Brittis Benzler	10,495.1	4,052.2	367,064	35.0	91
SE-G	SE212		Kronoberg	Växjö	Maria Arnholm	8,466.0	3,268.7	203,340	24.0	62
SE-H	SE213		Kalmar	Kalmar	Allan Widman	11,217.8	4,331.2	247,175	22.0	57
SE-I	SE214		Gotland	Visby	Charlotte Petri Gornitzka	3,151.4	1,216.8	61,001	19.4	50
SE-K	SE221		Blekinge	Karlskrona	Ulrica Messing	2,946.4	1,137.6	158,937	53.9	140
SE-M	SE224		Skåne	Malmö, Kristianstad	Peter Danielsson	11,034.5	4,260.4	1,402,425	127	330
SE-N	SE231		Halland	Halmstad	Anders Thornberg	5,460.7	2,108.4	340,243	62.3	161
SE-O	SE232		Västra Götaland	Gothenburg, Vänersborg	Sten Tolgfors	23,948.8	9,246.7	1,744,859	72.9	189
SE-S	SE311		Värmland	Karlstad	Georg Andrén	17,591.0	6,791.9	283,196	16.1	42
SE-T	SE124		Örebro	Örebro	Lena Rådström Baastad	8,545.6	3,299.5	306,792	35.9	93
SE-U	SE125		Västmanland	Västerås	Acko Ankarberg Johansson	5,145.8	1,986.8	278,967	54.2	140
SE-W	SE312		Dalarna	Falun	Helena Höij	28,188.8	10,883.8	288,387	10.2	26
SE-X	SE313		Gävleborg	Gävle	Carina Ståhl Herrstedt	18,198.9	7,026.6	287,767	15.8	41
SE-Y	SE321		Västernorrland	Härnösand	Carin Jämtin	21,683.8	8,372.2	244,193	11.3	29
SE-Z	SE322		Jämtland	Östersund	Marita Ljung	49,341.2	19,050.7	132,054	2.68	6.9
SE-AC	SE331		Västerbotten	Umeå	Helene Hellmark Knutsson	55,186.2	21,307.5	274,563	4.98	12.9
SE-BD	SE332		Norrbotten	Luleå	Lotta Finstorp	98,244.8	37,932.5	249,693	2.54	6.6

== Map ==
With county codes, which were official until 1974.

- AB: Stockholm County
- C: Uppsala County
- D: Södermanland County
- E: Östergötland County
- F: Jönköping County
- G: Kronoberg County
- H: Kalmar County
- I: Gotland County
- K: Blekinge County
- M: Skåne County
- N: Halland County
- O: Västra Götaland County
- S: Värmland County
- T: Örebro County
- U: Västmanland County
- W: Dalarna County
- X: Gävleborg County
- Y: Västernorrland County
- Z: Jämtland County
- AC: Västerbotten County
- BD: Norrbotten County

Counties of Sweden

Comparison with the provinces of Sweden
Bold lines represent county borders, colors represent provinces.

Each county region contains a number of municipalities (kommuner), the existence of which is partly at the discretion of the central government. Since 2004 their number has been 290, thus an average of 13.8 municipalities per county.

Until 1968, the City of Stockholm had its own "county code" A, which is still used interchangeably with AB in some contexts, and County of Stockholm had county code B. L was for Kristianstad County and M was for Malmöhus County but since they were merged to form Skåne County, M is usually used. O used to stand for Gothenburg and Bohus County but has been used for Västra Götaland County since it was merged with Skaraborg County (R) and Älvsborg County (P).

== History ==
=== Older subdivisions ===
Sweden's provinces, or landskap, and the "lands", or landsdelar, lack political importance today but are common denominations culturally and historically. The provinces had their own laws and justice systems and could have large cultural and religious differences. The province of Småland (literally small land) historically was several provinces with its own laws. Here burial tradition in the era before the Viking Age could differ significantly from province to province. The province of Norrbotten is a relatively recent creation; it was part of Västerbotten which extended all the way to Österbotten in today's Finland before 1809. Finnish and Swedish Lapland formed a single province until 1809.

Historically, the provinces were grouped in three lands: Götaland, being southern and western Sweden; Svealand being eastern and south-eastern, and Norrland being the entire northern half. The names of the first two refer to ancient tribes, and the third is a geographical reference. They are still commonly used as geographical references. The boundaries have changed over time, with the most significant in 1658 (the cession of provinces from Denmark-Norway to Sweden) and 1812 (due to the loss of Finland to Russia in 1809). In 1812, some provinces were moved from Götaland to Svealand.

=== Finland ===
After the Finnish War, Sweden was forced to cede the counties in Finland to Russia following the Treaty of Fredrikshamn in (1809). However, the counties were upheld in Finland until a reform in 1997. They are still in use in Sweden, 370 years later.

The counties in Finland established in 1634 were: Turku and Pori County, Nyland and Tavastehus County, Viborg and Nyslott County, Ostrobothnia County and Kexholm County. Over time the number of subdivisions in Finland increased to twelve, until a reorganization in 1997 reduced their number to six provinces, while keeping the administrative model intact. The counties in Finland were abolished in 2010.

=== Abolished counties ===
Abolished counties in current-day Sweden proper were:

- Skaraborg County + Gothenburg and Bohus County + Älvsborg County (merged as Västra Götaland County in 1998)
- Kopparberg County (became Dalarna County in 1997)
- Malmöhus County + Kristianstad County (merged as Skåne County in 1997)
- Norrland County (in 1645 divided into Västerbotten County, Hudiksvall County and Härnösand County)
- Nyköping County, Gripsholm County and Eskilstunahus County (united in 1683 to become Södermanland County)
- Närke and Värmland County (became Örebro County)
- Härnösand County (1645–1654, formed Västernorrland County)
- Hudiksvall County (1645–1654, formed Gävleborg County)
- Office of the Governor of Stockholm (1634–1967, united with Stockholm County)
- Svartsjö County (1786–1809, united with Stockholm County)
- Öland County (1819–1826, united with Kalmar County)

Counties in Swedish-ruled Finland were:

- Turku and Pori County (1634–1809)
- Nyland and Tavastehus County (1634–1809)
- Ostrobothnia County (1634–1775)
- Viborg and Nyslott County (1634–1721)
- Kexholm County (1634–1721)
- Kymmenegård and Nyslott County (1721–1747)
- Savolax and Kymmenegård County (1747–1775)
- Vasa County (1775–1809)
- Oulu County (1775–1809)
- Kymmenegård County (1775–1809)
- Savolax and Karelia County (1775–1809)

== Proposed regions ==
Six or nine new administrative regions.

Under the aegis of the Swedish government, Ansvarskommittén has been investigating the possibilities of merging the current 21 counties into 6 to 9 larger regions. These proposals are from their final report, delivered in 2007:

1. Norra Sverige: Norrbotten County + Västerbotten County + Jämtland County + Västernorrland County + Nordanstig and Hudiksvall
2. Bergslagen: the rest of Gävleborg County + Dalarna County + Örebro County + Värmland County
3. Mälardalen: Stockholm County + Uppsala County + Södermanland County + Västmanland County + Gotland County
4. Västra Götaland: Västra Götaland County + Halland County
5. Östra Götaland: Östergötland County + Jönköping County + Kronoberg County + Kalmar County
6. Södra Götaland: Skåne County + Blekinge County
1. Norra Sverige: Norrbotten County + Västerbotten County + Örnsköldsvik
2. Mellannorrland: Jämtland County + Västernorrland County (except Örnsköldsvik) + Nordanstig and Hudiksvall
3. Dalarna-Gävleborg: Dalarna County + Gävleborg County (except Nordanstig and Hudiksvall)
4. Västra Svealand: Värmland County + Örebro County
5. Mälardalen: Stockholm County + Uppsala County + Södermanland County + Västmanland County + Gotland County
6. Västra Götaland: Västra Götaland County + Halland County
7. Östergötland: Östergötland County + Västervik
8. Småland: Jönköping County + Kronoberg County + Kalmar County (except Västervik)
9. Södra Götaland: Skåne County + Blekinge County

A model for this comes from the merger of some counties into Skåne County and Västra Götaland County in 1997 and 1998, respectively, which is now considered a success.

The counties are discussing the proposal. An obstacle is that Stockholm County does not want to merge with any other county, while its neighbours want to merge with Stockholm. After this discussion the following proposal has in 2016 emerged:

1. Norrbotten, Västerbotten, Västernorrland and Jämtland county
2. Dalarna, Gävleborgs, Södermanlands, Uppsala, Västmanland and Örebro county
3. Östergötland, Jönköping, Kalmar and Kronoberg county
4. Gotland and Stockholm county
5. Halland, Värmland and Västra Götaland county
6. Blekinge and Skåne county

The main difference is that the proposed Bergslagen is divided to other counties, and Stockholm is on its own (plus the small Gotland which has air connections to Stockholm)

== Riksområden ==
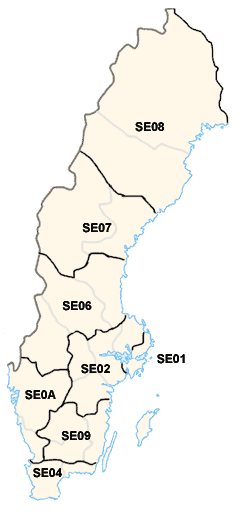
Current statistical regions (riksområden).

The counties in Sweden correspond to the third level of division in the European Union's system of Nomenclature of Territorial Units for Statistics. For the purpose of creating regions corresponding to the second level, counties have been grouped into eight Riksområden, or National Areas: Stockholm, East Middle Sweden, North Middle Sweden, Middle Norrland, Upper Norrland, Småland and the islands, West Sweden and South Sweden.

== See also ==
- Administrative divisions of Sweden
- Ranked list of Swedish counties
- ISO 3166-2 codes for Sweden
- Subdivisions of the Nordic countries
