= NUTS statistical regions of Sweden =

Statistical regions of Sweden

In the NUTS (Nomenclature of Territorial Units for Statistics) codes of Sweden (SE), the three levels are:

| Level | Subdivisions | # |
|---|---|---|
| NUTS 1 | Lands (Swedish: landsdelar) | 3 |
| NUTS 2 | National areas (Swedish: riksområden) | 8 |
| NUTS 3 | Counties (Swedish: Län) | 21 |

== NUTS codes ==
8 National Areas of Sweden

SE SWEDEN (SVERIGE)

SE1 EAST SWEDEN (ÖSTRA SVERIGE)

SE11 Stockholm (Stockholm)

SE110 Stockholm County (Stockholms län)

SE12 East Middle Sweden (Östra Mellansverige)

SE121 Uppsala County (Uppsala län)
SE122 Södermanland County (Södermanlands län)
SE123 Östergötland County (Östergötlands län)
SE124 Örebro County (Örebro län)
SE125 Västmanland County (Västmanlands län)

SE2 SOUTH SWEDEN (SÖDRA SVERIGE)

SE21 Småland and the islands (Småland med öarna)

SE211 Jönköping County (Jönköpings län)
SE212 Kronoberg County (Kronobergs län)
SE213 Kalmar County (Kalmar län)
SE214 Gotland County (Gotlands län)

SE22 South Sweden (Sydsverige)

SE221 Blekinge County (Blekinge län)
SE224 Skåne County (Skåne län)

SE23 West Sweden (Västsverige)

SE231 Halland County (Hallands län)
SE232 Västra Götaland County (Västra Götalands län)

SE3 NORTH SWEDEN (NORRA SVERIGE)

SE31 North Middle Sweden (Norra Mellansverige)

SE311 Värmland County (Värmlands län)
SE312 Dalarna County (Dalarnas län)
SE313 Gävleborg County (Gävleborgs län)

SE32 Middle Norrland (Mellersta Norrland)

SE321 Västernorrland County (Västernorrlands län)
SE322 Jämtland County (Jämtlands län)

SE33 Upper Norrland (Övre Norrland)

SE331 Västerbotten County (Västerbottens län)
SE332 Norrbotten County (Norrbottens län)

=== NUTS codes prior to 31.12.2007 ===
Prior to 31.12.2007, the codes were as follows:

The National Areas of Sweden are 8 second level subdivisions (NUTS-2) of Sweden, created by the European Union for statistical purposes.

The 8 riksområden (Singular : Riksområde) includes the 21 counties of Sweden. Only Stockholm (SE01) corresponds simply to the homonymous county.

| NUTS 1 | Code | NUTS 2 | Code | NUTS 3 | Code |
|---|---|---|---|---|---|
| Sweden | SE0 | Stockholm | SE01 | Stockholm County | SE010 |
| NUTS2 codes for Sweden | | East Middle Sweden | SE02 | Uppsala County | SE021 |
| NUTS2 codes for Sweden | | East Middle Sweden | SE02 | Södermanland County | SE022 |
| NUTS2 codes for Sweden | | East Middle Sweden | SE02 | Östergötland County | SE023 |
| NUTS2 codes for Sweden | | East Middle Sweden | SE02 | Örebro County | SE024 |
| NUTS2 codes for Sweden | | East Middle Sweden | SE02 | Västmanland County | SE025 |
| NUTS2 codes for Sweden | | South Sweden | SE04 | Blekinge County | SE041 |
| NUTS2 codes for Sweden | | South Sweden | SE04 | Skåne County | SE044 |
| NUTS2 codes for Sweden | | North Middle Sweden | SE06 | Värmland County | SE061 |
| NUTS2 codes for Sweden | | North Middle Sweden | SE06 | Dalarna County | SE062 |
| NUTS2 codes for Sweden | | North Middle Sweden | SE06 | Gävleborg County | SE063 |
| NUTS2 codes for Sweden | | Middle Norrland | SE07 | Västernorrland County | SE071 |
| NUTS2 codes for Sweden | | Middle Norrland | SE07 | Jämtland County | SE072 |
| NUTS2 codes for Sweden | | Upper Norrland | SE08 | Västerbotten County | SE081 |
| NUTS2 codes for Sweden | | Upper Norrland | SE08 | Norrbotten County | SE082 |
| NUTS2 codes for Sweden | | Småland and the islands | SE09 | Jönköping County | SE091 |
| NUTS2 codes for Sweden | | Småland and the islands | SE09 | Kronoberg County | SE092 |
| NUTS2 codes for Sweden | | Småland and the islands | SE09 | Kalmar County | SE093 |
| NUTS2 codes for Sweden | | Småland and the islands | SE09 | Gotland County | SE094 |
| NUTS2 codes for Sweden | | West Sweden | SE0A | Halland County | SE0A1 |
| NUTS2 codes for Sweden | | West Sweden | SE0A | Västra Götaland County | SE0A2 |

== Local administrative units ==
Below the NUTS levels, the two LAU (Local Administrative Units) levels are:

| Level | Subdivisions | # |
|---|---|---|
| LAU 1 | — (same as NUTS 3) | 21 |
| LAU 2 | Municipalities (Swedish: kommuner) | 290 |

The LAU codes of Sweden can be downloaded here:

== NUTS 1 compared to Lands of Sweden ==
While similar, NUTS 1 doesn't correspond to Lands of Sweden.

== See also ==
- List of Swedish regions by Human Development Index
- Subdivisions of Sweden
- ISO 3166-2 codes of Sweden
- FIPS region codes of Sweden
