= Norrland =

Northernmost region of Sweden

- Land of Sweden
- Coordinates: 65°N 18°E

Area
  - Total: 261,292 km^{2} (100,885 sq mi)

Population (31 December 2021)
  - Total: 1,188,031
  - Density: 4.54676/km^{2} (11.7760/sq mi)

Gross Regional Product
  - Total: SEK 427.062 billion €45.629 billion (2015)
- Time zone: UTC+1 (CET)
  - Summer (DST): UTC+2 (CEST)

Norrland (Swedish: [ˈnɔ̌rːland], lit. 'Northland', originally Norrlanden, meaning 'the Northlands') is the northernmost, largest and least populated of the three traditional lands of Sweden, consisting of nine provinces. Although Norrland does not serve any administrative purposes, it continues to exist as a historical, cultural, and geographic region; it is often referred to in everyday language, e.g., in weather forecasts. Several related Norrland dialects form a distinct subset of dialects of the Swedish language separate from those to its south.

Norrland consists of the majority of the Swedish landmass at about 60% of the land area, but only has about 12% of the country's population. Its largest city is Umeå, while the other four county seats are Gävle, Härnösand, Östersund and Luleå. The largest non-capitals are Sundsvall, Skellefteå and Örnsköldsvik while Kiruna is the largest town of the vast Lapland province in the far north. Sweden's highest mountain Kebnekaise and deepest lake of Hornavan are in Norrland. Plenty of long rivers originating in the mountains run through the Norrland forests, with major coastal towns frequently being on their estuaries. Their extensive drops in elevation also make Norrland a major producer of hydroelectricity from some of those rivers.

Winters in Norrland are cold by Swedish standards but mild for the latitudes. The vastness of the region renders very different environments and climates, ranging from mild coastal climates of Gävleborg to the tundra climate of the high mountains. In general, the most common climate is the subarctic type. The cold climate has led to winter sports being popular, with Norrland teams and athletes being especially successful in ice hockey, skiing and bandy.

== Provinces and counties ==
Norrland comprises the historical nine provinces (landskap):

- Gästrikland
- Hälsingland
- Härjedalen
- Jämtland
- Medelpad
- Ångermanland
- Västerbotten
- Norrbotten
- Lappland

Historically, Jämtland and Härjedalen belonged to Norway until 1645, and are thus often considered outside of the historical Norrland. On the other hand, Finland belonged to Sweden until 1809, and during that time, Norrland was extended into Northern Finland. Administratively, Sweden is not divided into provinces but into counties (län). Although Norrland is defined in terms of the historical provinces and not the counties, it roughly comprises the modern counties of Gävleborg, Jämtland, Norrbotten, Västerbotten and Västernorrland.

Sometimes, Norrland is subdivided into Northern Norrland (norra Norrland) and Southern Norrland (södra Norrland). The northern part of the region typically covers the historical provinces of Norrbotten, Västerbotten and Lappland (the modern counties of Norrbotten and Västerbotten), while the southern part covers the remainder of the region. There is also the concept of Middle Norrland (mellersta Norrland), which is the northern part of Southern Norrland. Middle Norrland has no clearly defined boundaries, but usually corresponds with the historical provinces Ångermanland, Medelpad, Jämtland and Härjedalen.

== Geography ==
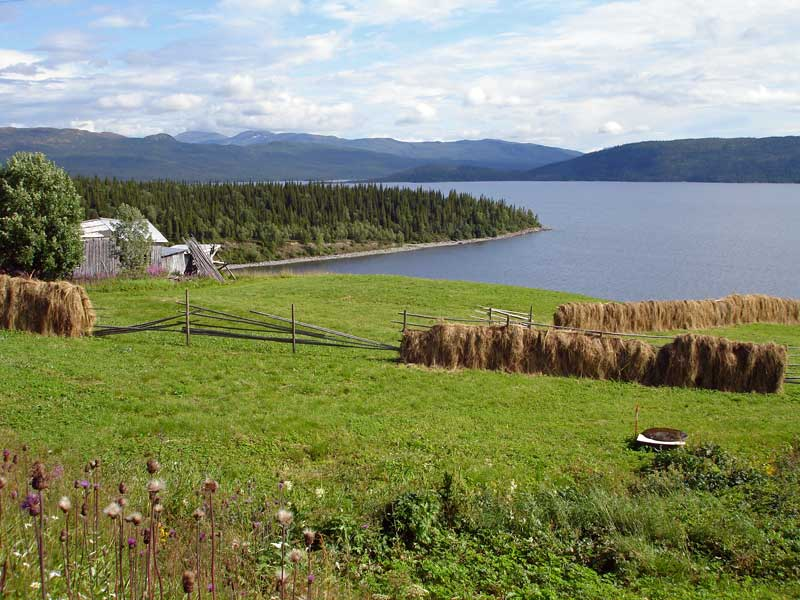
The village Stora Blåsjön and the lake of Stora Blåsjön in Strömsund Municipality, Jämtland.

Except for the coastal areas, Norrland is sparsely populated. Approximately 12 percent of Sweden's population lives in Norrland. Except for some coastal areas most of Norrland is made up by the Norrland terrain—hilly and mountainous land covered by boreal forests. More in detail Norrland is made up of three north–south belts: the Scandinavian Mountains in the west, the Muddus Plains covering much of the inland, and the mixed relief (Note: This includes coastal plains and parts of the Sub-Cambrian peneplain.) of the eastern coast.

Unlike the much more densely populated Svealand and Götaland, which are better known for big cities (Stockholm, Gothenburg, Malmö) with landmarks and tourist attractions, Norrland is known for its nature with wide forests, large rivers and untouched wilderness.

Most inhabitants live in rural areas and small villages and along the coast in cities. Towards the end of the 20th century, there was a noticeable increase of the population in Norrland, mainly from people moving from larger cities. The largest cities in Norrland, from north to south, are Luleå, Skellefteå, Umeå, Östersund, Sundsvall and Gävle. With the exception of Östersund, those cities are all near the coast.

During the Industrial Revolution, which reached Sweden in the mid-19th century, Norrland became the source for the important wood and pulp industry. All but four of the major Norrland rivers have been exploited for water power. The rivers in Norrland account for the bulk of hydroelectric power in Sweden, which is in many countries a limited energy source, but Sweden has hydroelectrical power account for approximately 40 percent of its total production of electricity.

Mines for producing precious metals have also been located in Norrland. In older history and still today, the administration in Stockholm viewed Norrland essentially as a colony consisting of natural resources to be exploited. "In Norrland we have an India within our borders, if only we realize we should be taking advantage of it" (I Norrland hava vi inom våra gränser ett Indien, blott vi förstå att bruka det) is a quote attributed to Axel Oxenstierna that fairly well describes the attitude. In the official history of Sweden, not much is written about the northern parts of the country.

Kebnekaise, Sweden's tallest mountain at 2,097 metres (6,879 feet), is located in Lappland in the north of Norrland.

Norrland has a highly variable climate depending on altitude, latitude and distance to water. The southern coastal areas have a humid continental climate, but further north, the subarctic climate is abundant, although it in many areas is very mild for that classification, especially in coastal regions. In the mountain ranges the tundra climate can be found with summer temperatures averaging below 10 °C (50 °F), but that is due to altitude and not in populated areas. All low-lying areas of Norrland are below the tree line because of the mild summers and so the boreal forest is dominant.

== History ==
In older history, Norrland is one of the four lands of Sweden. To the west it represented the northern half of Sweden bounded to the south by Svealand and to the east it represented the northern half of Finland – which was then a part of Sweden – bounded to the south by Österland. In Svealand and Götaland, the land boundaries were of major juridical and administrative importance, but this was not the case with Norrland. The name Norrland just gradually became a denomination of everything north of Svealand. Up to the Middle Ages, the northern part of Norrland (Norrbotten and Lappland) was sparsely populated by Sami, Kvens and different tribes/people related to the Finns. In the southern part of Norrland, Swedish and Norwegian settlers lived side by side with the Sami population. From the Middle Ages on, the Swedish kings tried to colonize and Christianize the area.

As a result of the changing relations to Finland, the northern borders of Norrland have shifted. While the word Finland originally meant only the southwestern part of what is now Finland (Finland Proper), the border of Norrland was drawn at the rivers Kaakamojoki or, later, Simojoki. This changed when the eastern half of Sweden (Finland) was lost to Russia in 1809, and the new border was drawn at Torne River. The southern border was originally everything north of the Gästrikland province (until the 14th or 15th century a part of Uppland), but since the mid 17th century, Gästrikland is also considered a part of Norrland. The name can be first traced from Karl's Chronicle, explaining how Engelbrekt Engelbrektsson in 1433 sent a letter to Erik Puke requesting assistance to conquer entire Norrland (al norland vnte han honom wolla).

== Sport ==
Ice hockey is generally regarded to be the most popular spectator sport in Norrland. Many of Sweden's most famous hockey players are natives of Norrland, including Peter Forsberg, Börje Salming, Markus Näslund, Henrik Lundqvist, Nicklas Bäckström, Elias Pettersson, and twin brothers Henrik and Daniel Sedin. As of the 2023–24 season, four Norrland teams currently compete in the Swedish Hockey League: Luleå HF, Skellefteå AIK, MoDo Hockey and Timrå IK. Additionally, Brynäs IF and IF Björklöven are also two popular teams from Norrland with long traditions in Swedish ice hockey who currently compete in the second highest league Hockeyallsvenskan.

Skiing, both alpine and nordic, is also a popular sport in Norrland. Two of Sweden's largest and most popular ski resorts, Åre and Hemavan, are located in Norrland. Famous skiers from the region include Ingemar Stenmark, Anja Pärson and Per Elofsson.

Football is also popular in Norrland, but teams from the region have rarely been on the same competitive level as the big city clubs in southern Sweden. To date, no Norrland team has ever won Allsvenskan, Sweden's highest-level football league, and Sandvikens IF is the only Norrland team that has ever finished in the top four (last time in 1956). As of the 2023 season, no team from Norrland currently plays in Allsvenskan. However, teams such as GIF Sundsvall, Gefle IF and Östersunds FK have all in recent years played many seasons in Sweden's highest league, and the region has produced its share of famous footballers. Gunnar Nordahl, Tomas Brolin, Jesper Blomqvist and Mikael Lustig are all footballers who grew up in Norrland, and went on to become Swedish internationals.

== In fiction ==
Norrland is often "othered" in Swedish fiction, used as a canvas for stories involving terror and dread. The thriller films The Hunters and False Trail (The Hunters 2) show a highly negative portrait of Norrland, filled with racial prejudice and violence. The people of Norrland in their turn tend to have a fairly negative view of people from Stockholm and the rest of southern Sweden, for example by referring to Stockholm as fjollträsk, which loosely translated means "sissy swamp". This dynamic is portrayed in movies and series such as Sällskapsresan 2 – Snowroller, The Hunters and Pistvakt – En vintersaga. Despite Norrland being the most diverse of the three lands of Sweden in terms of languages and cultures it is usually portrayed as one homogeneous region. Fiction usually portrays characters from Norrland as villagers from the wilderness even though the majority of the population live in and around the coastal cities.

In the 2006 horror film Frostbite, the portrait is more balanced. Unlike most other Swedish films, it takes place in a larger community at the northern peak of Sweden, being filmed in Kalix and Kiruna. The people are shown to be pretty warm and welcoming towards outsiders. Rather than the people, the nature of Norrland is shown to be hostile. A constant darkness roams over the town and there is extreme cold. Vampires have been shown taking a liking to the land and hunt the towns people in the arctic night. The film is notorious for having the actors speak without the district Norrland accent, even the actors in the film who are native to Norrland.

A mixed portrait of the region is found in As It Is in Heaven (2004), which "vividly conveys both the delights and the challenges of small town living." The northern town is initially inhospitable to the main character as a boy, whose mother chooses to take him out of the town to escape bullying. He returns years later as an accomplished musician, only to find an insular town where bullying continues in several forms, including from the original classmates who troubled him as a youth. It is through his outside status—along with his music and desire share its joy—that the town finds redemption.

The plot of Stieg Larsson's 2005 thriller The Girl with the Dragon Tattoo shifts back and forth between Stockholm and the fictional town of Hedestad, which Larsson places along "the Norrland coast... a little more than an hour north of Gävle." A repeated theme is the social, cultural and physical differences between Stockholm and Norrland, despite Hedestad only being three hours north of Stockholm by train. Norrland is depicted as being more sedate, conservative and slow-moving in comparison with the cosmopolitan Stockholm; a Stockholmer having to live for an extended period in Norrland feels "exiled to the back of beyond." Norrland is also colder, and a Stockholmer coming there must urgently buy warmer clothes (a theme which is also present in As It Is in Heaven); Norrlanders often speak regional dialects which Stockholm people find nearly incomprehensible; Stockholm people look down their noses at "a working class boy from Norrland" even when he had lived many years in Stockholm. The book's great success and translation into numerous languages made non-Swedish people more aware of Norrland's distinct characteristics.

== Gallery ==
The three lands of Sweden

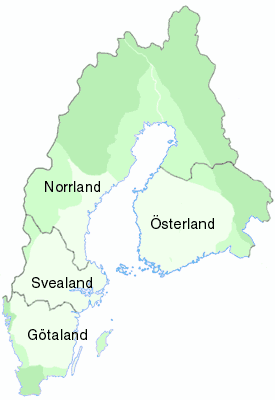
Norrland when Finland was an integrated part of Sweden.

Unofficial flag

== See also ==
- Svealand
- Götaland
- Österland
- Upper Norrland
- Middle Norrland
- Sápmi
- Lappland
- Historical provinces of Finland
- Norrland Grand Regiment
- Norrland County
- Norland (disambiguation)
- Nordland (disambiguation)
