= Administrative divisions of Sweden =

There are several series of subdivisions of Sweden.

- Judiciary
  1. Supreme Court (Högsta Domstolen), Supreme Administrative Court (Högsta förvaltningsdomstolen)
  2. Courts of appeal (hovrätter), administrative courts of appeal (kammarrätter) (and historically: lagsagor)
  3. District courts (tingsrätter), county administrative courts (länsrätter)
- Central executive
  1. Cabinet of Sweden, Government agencies in Sweden
  2. County administrative boards of Sweden
- Local government
  1. Regions of Sweden (regioner) - there are 21
  2. Municipalities of Sweden (kommuner) - there are 290
  3. City districts of Sweden (stadsdelar or stadsdelsnämndsområden)
- Ecclesiastically
  1. Church of Sweden
  2. Dioceses (stift)
  3. Kontrakt
  4. Pastorat
  5. Parishes (församlingar)
- Historically
  1. Lands of Sweden
  2. Provinces of Sweden
  3. Hundreds of Sweden
  4. Socknar (both parishes and rural municipalities)
- Proposed
  1. Regions of Sweden

== See also ==
- Subdivisions of the Nordic countries
- NUTS statistical regions of Sweden
