= Lands of Sweden =

Historical division of the provinces of Sweden into three groups

The three lands of Sweden

The lands of Sweden (Swedish: Sveriges landsdelar) are three traditional and historical regions of the country, each consisting of several provinces. The division into lands goes back to the consolidation of Sweden, when Götaland, the land of the Geats, merged with Svealand, the land of the Swedes, to form the country, while Norrland and Österland (the latter now Finland) were added later. The lands have no administrative function but are still seen by many Swedes as an important part of their identity, and they are regularly mentioned in televised weather reports.

== Subdivision ==
- Götaland (Gothenland or Gothia, "Land of the Geats") is the southernmost, most densely populated part, consisting of ten provinces.
- Svealand (Swealand, "Land of the Swedes") is the central, and smallest of the three lands, with six provinces; the administrative centre of Sweden has been situated here at least since the late Middle Ages.
- Norrland (literally "Northland") is the northernmost, and largest, of the three lands, covering 60 percent of the total land area of Sweden, with nine provinces. Despite its large geographic size, most of the area is very sparsely populated, and it's far smaller than the other two lands by population. The three northernmost provinces are often referred to as Övre (Upper) Norrland, while the rest of the provinces are referred to as Nedre (Lower) Norrland.

The lands have no administrative functions (Note: Although the Courts of appeal in Sweden are named in part after Lands, their jurisdictions overlap, but do not match that of the Lands.) or coats of arms, but are in common use when referring to different parts of the country, including in all nationwide weather reports in Swedish media.

Areas and populations of the lands:

| Land | GDP (billion SEK | Population (2021) | Area | | Density | | Num. of prov. | Provinces |
| Land | GDP (billion SEK | Population (2021) | km^{2} | sq mi | per km^{2} | per sq mi | Num. of prov. | Provinces |
|---|---|---|---|---|---|---|---|---|
| Götaland | 1,812.447 | 4,995,764 | 97,841 | 37,777 | 51 | 130 | 10 | Scania, Blekinge, Halland, Småland, Öland, Gotland, Östergötland, Västergötland, Dalsland and Bohuslän |
| Svealand | 1,960.351 | 4,268,504 | 91,098 | 35,173 | 47 | 120 | 6 | Södermanland, Uppland, Västmanland, Närke, Värmland and Dalarna |
| Norrland | 427.062 | 1,188,031 | 261,292 | 100,885 | 4.5 | 12 | 9 | Gästrikland, Hälsingland, Härjedalen, Jämtland, Medelpad, Ångermanland, Västerbotten, Norrbotten and Lappland |

== Historical lands ==
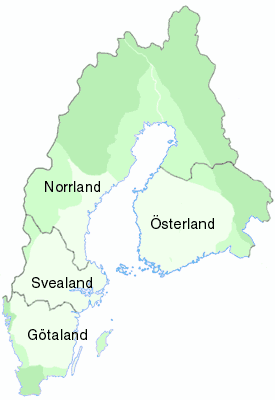
The former lands of Sweden

Sweden was historically divided into the four lands: Götaland, Svealand, Norrland and Österland.

- Österland (literally Eastland) is an old name for southern Finland. The term has been obsolete since the 15th century and is virtually unknown in Sweden today. In most dictionaries, "österlandet" simply means the orient.
- Norrland was the name for the annexed lands to the north on both sides of the Gulf of Bothnia.
- In Sweden's prehistoric times, Sweden was largely limited to Svealand and southern Norrland, while Götaland was mentioned as a rival kingdom, and stories of Swedish-Geatish wars survive in the Anglo-Saxon epic Beowulf. Eventually, the two countries were united under one crown, though it is a matter of debate when, as historians have claimed that it happened as early as the 6th century AD and as late as the 13th century AD.

In the Second Treaty of Brömsebro (1645) Denmark-Norway ceded the Norwegian provinces of Jämtland and Härjedalen to Sweden. These provinces are part of Norrland. In the Treaty of Roskilde (1658), Denmark-Norway ceded Scania, Blekinge and Halland (Skåneland) and Bohuslän to Sweden. These provinces are since then part of Götaland.

After the Finnish War (1808–1809), the eastern part of Sweden was ceded to Russia, thus becoming the Imperial Russian Grand Duchy of Finland, with Norrland divided between these two states. The Swedish portion of Norrland still represents more than half of Sweden's territory; it remains, however, sparsely populated compared to the south and middle.

== See also ==
- Finland under Swedish rule
- Dominions of Sweden
- Provinces of Sweden
- Old Finland
- Historical provinces of Finland
- Subdivisions of the Nordic countries
- Lands of Denmark
