= ISO 3166-2:SE =

Entry for Sweden in ISO 3166-2

ISO 3166-2:SE is the entry for Sweden in ISO 3166-2, part of the ISO 3166 standard published by the International Organization for Standardization (ISO), which defines codes for the names of the principal subdivisions (e.g., provinces or states) of all countries coded in ISO 3166-1.

Currently for Sweden, ISO 3166-2 codes are defined for 21 counties.

Each code consists of two parts, separated by a hyphen. The first part is SE, the ISO 3166-1 alpha-2 code of Sweden. The second part is one or two letters, which is the alphabetic code (Swedish: länsbokstav) of the county, and was used in vehicle registration plates until 1973.

== Current codes ==
Subdivision names are listed as in the ISO 3166-2 standard published by the ISO 3166 Maintenance Agency (ISO 3166/MA).

In ISO 3166-2, the numeric code (länskod) of each county is shown for information purposes in square brackets after the name of the county. However, these alternative code elements are not official ISO 3166-2 codes, since this part of ISO 3166 does not allow for duplicate coding of identical subdivisions.

Subdivision names are sorted in Swedish alphabetical order: a–z, å, ä, ö.

Click on the button in the header to sort each column.

=== Counties ===
Map of Sweden with each county labelled with the second part of its ISO 3166-2 code.

Code	Subdivision name (sv)	Subdivision name (en)	Alternative code
SE-K	Blekinge län	Blekinge	[SE-10]
SE-W	Dalarnas län	Dalarna	[SE-20]
SE-I	Gotlands län	Gotland	[SE-09]
SE-X	Gävleborgs län	Gävleborg	[SE-21]
SE-N	Hallands län	Halland	[SE-13]
SE-Z	Jämtlands län	Jämtland	[SE-23]
SE-F	Jönköpings län	Jönköping	[SE-06]
SE-H	Kalmar län	Kalmar	[SE-08]
SE-G	Kronobergs län	Kronoberg	[SE-07]
SE-BD	Norrbottens län	Norrbotten	[SE-25]
SE-M	Skåne län	Scania	[SE-12]
SE-AB	Stockholms län	Stockholm	[SE-01]
SE-D	Södermanlands län	Södermanland	[SE-04]
SE-C	Uppsala län	Uppsala	[SE-03]
SE-S	Värmlands län	Värmland	[SE-17]
SE-AC	Västerbottens län	Västerbotten	[SE-24]
SE-Y	Västernorrlands län	Western Northland	[SE-22]
SE-U	Västmanlands län	Västmanland	[SE-19]
SE-O	Västra Götalands län	Västra Götaland	[SE-14]
SE-T	Örebro län	Örebro	[SE-18]
SE-E	Östergötlands län	Östergötland	[SE-05]

== Changes ==
The following changes to the entry have been announced in newsletters by the ISO 3166/MA since the first publication of ISO 3166-2 in 1998:

Newsletter	Date issued	Description of change in newsletter
Newsletter II-3	2011-12-13 (corrected 2011-12-15)	Name precision of the administrative division, Alphabetical re-ordering and source list update.

== See also ==
- Subdivisions of Sweden
- FIPS region codes of Sweden
- NUTS codes of Sweden
- Neighbouring countries: FI (also AX), NO
