= Subdivisions of the Nordic countries =

Scandinavia by type of locality

The administrative divisions of the Nordic countries are similar given the countries' shared culture and history.

== Denmark ==
- Denmark proper
  - 5 regions (Danish: regioner)
  - 98 municipalities (Danish: kommuner)
- 2 autonomous insular overseas dependencies
  - Faroe Islands
    - 6 regions
    - 29 municipalities
  - Greenland
    - 5 municipalities
    - 1 unincorporated national park
    - 1 unincorporated space base

== Finland ==
- Finland
  - 19 regions (Finnish: maakunnat, Swedish: landskap)
    - Åland
    - 69 sub-regions (Finnish: seutukunnat, Swedish: ekonomiska regioner)
      - 308 municipalities (Finnish: kunnat, Swedish: kommuner)

== Iceland ==
- Iceland
  - 6 constituencies (Icelandic: kjördæmi), electoral
  - 8 regions (Icelandic: landshlutar), statistical
  - 61 municipalities (Icelandic: sveitarfélög), administrative

== Norway ==
- Norway proper
  - 15 counties (Norwegian: fylker)
  - 357 municipalities (Norwegian: kommuner)
- overseas dependencies
  - 2 unincorporated overseas dependencies
  - 3 unintegrated overseas dependencies

== Sweden ==
- Sweden
  - 21 counties (Swedish: län)
    - 290 municipalities (Swedish: kommuner)
