= List of NUTS regions in the European Union by GDP =

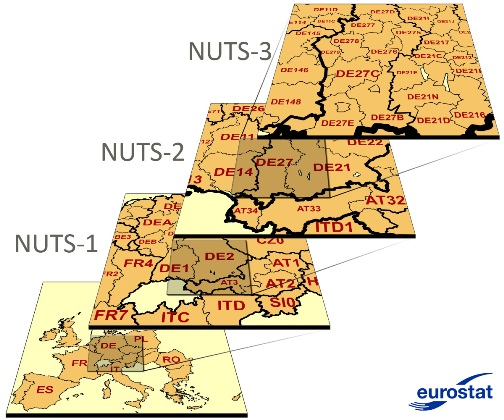
The European Union uses a hierarchical system to classify regions for statistics purposes

This is a list of NUTS regions in the European Union by GDP. The European Union uses a classification for subnational territory called Nomenclature of Territorial Units for Statistics (French: Nomenclature des unités territoriales statistiques) (commonly abbreviated as NUTS). The NUTS 1 classification is applied to a group of regions, NUTS 2 for regions and NUTS 3 as subdivisions of regions. There are also two levels (NUTS 4 and 5) which relate to local administrative unit levels. Countries agree a NUTS classification with the European Commission. Geddes notes that NUTS level 2 is "particularly important", because they often exist as territorial-government divisions and are used for regional policies by countries. NUTS 1 typically has a population of 3-7 million; NUTS 2 0.8-3 million; and NUTS 3 150,000-800,000. As of 2015, there are 98 regions at NUTS 1 level, 276 regions at NUTS 2 level and 1,342 regions at NUTS 3 level (as a result, statistics at the NUTS level 3 are found as an external link to this article). The EU is based on the classification of NUTS 2 regions as: less developed regions, transition regions and more developed regions. The EU's Structural Funds and Cohesion Fund direct funding to NUTS level 2 regions based on their GDP (PPS) per capita in comparison to the EU average: less developed regions (less than 75%), transition regions (between 75% and 90% and more developed regions (over 90%). For the period 2014–20, EUR 351 billion will be invested in the EU's regions with most being directed to the less developed regions.

== NUTS level 1 (data in 2017) ==
| Region | Country | Euro total | Euro per capita | PPS total | PPS per capita | PPS per capita anomaly |
|---|---|---|---|---|---|---|
| East Austria | Austria | 159,978 | 41,700 | 144,757 | 37,700 | 126 |
| South Austria | Austria | 67,457 | 37,500 | 61,039 | 33,900 | 113 |
| West Austria | Austria | 142,330 | 45,100 | 128,788 | 40,800 | 136 |
| Brussels Capital Region | Belgium | 77,694 | 65,000 | 70,213 | 58,700 | 196 |
| Flemish Region | Belgium | 259,786 | 39,800 | 234,771 | 35,900 | 120 |
| Walloon Region | Belgium | 101,378 | 28,000 | 91,616 | 25,300 | 84 |
| Northern and Eastern Bulgaria | Bulgaria | 19,646 | 5,500 | 39,801 | 11,200 | 37 |
| South-Western and South-Central Bulgaria | Bulgaria | 32,017 | 9,100 | 64,865 | 18,400 | 61 |
| Cyprus | Cyprus | 19,571 | 22,800 | 21,857 | 25,400 | 85 |
| Czech Republic | Czech Republic | 191,722 | 18,100 | 284,422 | 26,900 | 89 |
| Baden-Württemberg | Germany | 496,240 | 45,200 | 464,621 | 42,300 | 141 |
| Bavaria | Germany | 597,818 | 46,100 | 559,727 | 43,200 | 144 |
| Berlin | Germany | 136,231 | 37,900 | 127,550 | 35,500 | 118 |
| Brandenburg | Germany | 69,487 | 27,800 | 65,059 | 26,000 | 87 |
| Bremen | Germany | 33,791 | 49,700 | 31,638 | 46,500 | 155 |
| Hamburg | Germany | 117,779 | 64,700 | 110,274 | 60,600 | 202 |
| Hessen | Germany | 280,003 | 45,000 | 262,162 | 42,100 | 140 |
| Mecklenburg-Vorpommern | Germany | 42,930 | 26,700 | 40,195 | 25,000 | 83 |
| Lower Saxony | Germany | 290,010 | 36,500 | 271,531 | 34,100 | 114 |
| North Rhine-Westphalia | Germany | 693,304 | 38,700 | 649,128 | 36,300 | 121 |
| Rhineland-Palatinate | Germany | 145,219 | 35,700 | 135,966 | 33,400 | 111 |
| Saarland | Germany | 35,447 | 35,300 | 33,189 | 33,300 | 111 |
| Saxony | Germany | 122,178 | 29,900 | 114,393 | 28,000 | 93 |
| Saxony-Anhalt | Germany | 61,064 | 27,400 | 57,173 | 25,600 | 85 |
| Schleswig-Holstein | Germany | 93,640 | 32,400 | 87,673 | 30,400 | 101 |
| Thuringia | Germany | 62,199 | 28,900 | 58,236 | 27,000 | 90 |
| Denmark | Denmark | 289,030 | 50,100 | 218,418 | 38,400 | 128 |
| Estonia | Estonia | 23,615 | 18,000 | 31,114 | 23,700 | 79 |
| Attica | Greece | 85,285 | 22,700 | 102,709 | 27,300 | 91 |
| Aegean Islands, Crete | Greece | 17,574 | 14,900 | 21,164 | 17,900 | 60 |
| Northern Greece | Greece | 39,903 | 12,900 | 48,055 | 15,600 | 52 |
| Central Greece | Greece | 37,456 | 13,700 | 45,108 | 16,600 | 55 |
| North West Spain | Spain | 96,665 | 22,400 | 106,447 | 24,700 | 82 |
| North East Spain | Spain | 135,803 | 30,600 | 149,545 | 33,700 | 112 |
| Community of Madrid | Spain | 220,025 | 33,800 | 242,290 | 37,200 | 124 |
| Central Spain | Spain | 115,957 | 21,000 | 127,691 | 23,100 | 77 |
| East Spain | Spain | 363,056 | 26,800 | 399,795 | 29,500 | 98 |
| South Spain | Spain | 189,535 | 18,900 | 208,714 | 20,800 | 69 |
| Canary Islands | Spain | 44,503 | 20,600 | 49,006 | 22,700 | 75 |
| European Union | | 14,907,852 | 29,200 | 14,907,852 | 30,000 | 100 |
| Mainland Finland | Finland | 222,404 | 40,600 | 179,053 | 32,700 | 109 |
| Åland | Finland | 1,383 | 47,100 | 1,114 | 37,900 | 126 |
| Île-de-France | France | 709,197 | 58,300 | 645,686 | 53,100 | 177 |
| Centre-Val de Loire | France | 71,493 | 27,800 | 65,090 | 25,300 | 84 |
| Bourgogne-Franche-Comté | France | 74,806 | 26,600 | 68,107 | 24,300 | 81 |
| Normandie | France | 93,404 | 28,100 | 85,039 | 25,500 | 85 |
| Nord-Pas-de-Calais-Picardie | France | 159,149 | 26,500 | 144,897 | 24,200 | 80 |
| Alsace-Champagne-Ardenne-Lorraine | France | 154,604 | 27,900 | 140,758 | 25,400 | 85 |
| Pays-de-la-Loire | France | 116,126 | 30,900 | 105,726 | 28,100 | 94 |
| Bretagne | France | 96,669 | 29,100 | 88,012 | 26,500 | 88 |
| Aquitaine-Limousin-Poitou-Charentes | France | 171,887 | 28,800 | 156,494 | 26,200 | 87 |
| Languedoc-Roussillon - Midi-Pyrénées | France | 166,127 | 28,400 | 151,249 | 25,800 | 86 |
| Auvergne-Rhône-Alpes | France | 263,149 | 33,000 | 239,583 | 30,000 | 100 |
| Provence-Alpes-Côte d’Azur | France | 158,136 | 31,400 | 143,974 | 28,600 | 95 |
| Corse | France | 9,230 | 27,600 | 8,403 | 25,100 | 84 |
| Overseas departments | France | 46,645 | 21,300 | 42,467 | 19,400 | 64 |
| Croatia | Croatia | 48,990 | 11,900 | 76,583 | 18,500 | 62 |
| Central Hungary | Hungary | 58,255 | 19,400 | 93,471 | 31,100 | 104 |
| Transdanubia | Hungary | 33,012 | 11,300 | 52,969 | 18,100 | 60 |
| Great Plain and North | Hungary | 32,783 | 8,500 | 52,601 | 13,700 | 45 |
| Ireland | Ireland | 294,110 | 61,200 | 260,729 | 54,300 | 181 |
| Northwest Italy | Italy | 567,394 | 35,200 | 575,411 | 35,700 | 119 |
| Northeast Italy | Italy | 398,789 | 34,300 | 404,424 | 34,700 | 116 |
| Central Italy | Italy | 369,780 | 30,700 | 375,004 | 31,100 | 104 |
| South Italy | Italy | 265,590 | 18,900 | 269,343 | 19,200 | 64 |
| Insular Italy | Italy | 122,077 | 18,200 | 123,802 | 18,500 | 62 |
| Lithuania | Lithuania | 42,191 | 14,900 | 66,412 | 23,500 | 78 |
| Luxembourg | Luxembourg | 55,299 | 92,600 | 45,326 | 75,900 | 253 |
| Latvia | Latvia | 26,996 | 13,900 | 38,845 | 20,000 | 67 |
| Malta | Malta | 11,228 | 24,100 | 13,687 | 29,300 | 97 |
| North Netherlands | Netherlands | 57,478 | 33,000 | 51,208 | 29,800 | 99 |
| East Netherlands | Netherlands | 128,789 | 34,200 | 110,714 | 31,800 | 106 |
| West Netherlands | Netherlands | 396,529 | 46,000 | 335,919 | 43,400 | 145 |
| South Netherlands | Netherlands | 151,980 | 40,600 | 132,721 | 37,300 | 124 |
| Województwo Mazowieckie | Poland | | | | 33,500 | 112 |
| Central Poland | Poland | | | | 18,000 | 60 |
| South Poland | Poland | 86,454 | 10,900 | 155,305 | 20,500 | 68 |
| East Poland | Poland | 52259 | 7,800 | 93,877 | 14,600 | 49 |
| North West Poland | Poland | 67,440 | 10,900 | 121,150 | 20,400 | 68 |
| South West Poland | Poland | 44,484 | 11,400 | 79,911 | 21,400 | 71 |
| North Poland | Poland | 55,060 | 9,400 | 98,909 | 17,700 | 59 |
| Mainland Portugal | Portugal | 176,744 | 18,000 | 221,994 | 23,100 | 77 |
| Azores | Portugal | 3,927 | 16,000 | 4,933 | 20,500 | 68 |
| Madeira | Portugal | 4,353 | 17,000 | 5,468 | 22,000 | 73 |
| Romania 1 | Romania | 38,280 | 7,800 | 75,363 | 17,400 | 58 |
| Romania 2 | Romania | 35,241 | 6,200 | 69,379 | 13,400 | 45 |
| Romania 3 | Romania | 67,577 | 12,700 | 133,041 | 27,300 | 91 |
| Romania 4 | Romania | 28,532 | 7,500 | 56,172 | 16,700 | 55 |
| East Sweden | Sweden | 214,622 | 55,000 | 164,782 | 42,000 | 140 |
| South Sweden | Sweden | 182,298 | 42,500 | 139,964 | 33,300 | 111 |
| North Sweden | Sweden | 68,161 | 39,400 | 52,333 | 30,700 | 102 |
| Slovenia | Slovenia | 40,418 | 19,600 | 49,733 | 25,500 | 85 |
| Slovakia | Slovakia | 81,154 | 14,900 | 121,749 | 22,900 | 76 |
| North East England | United Kingdom | 69,469 | 26,300 | 59,712 | 23,200 | 77 |
| North West England | United Kingdom | 228,308 | 31,600 | 196,242 | 27,500 | 92 |
| Yorkshire and the Humber | United Kingdom | 153,804 | 28,300 | 132,202 | 24,700 | 82 |
| East Midlands | United Kingdom | 137,207 | 29,000 | 117,936 | 25,100 | 84 |
| West Midlands | United Kingdom | 173,537 | 29,900 | 149,164 | 26,100 | 87 |
| East of England | United Kingdom | 202,042 | 33,000 | 173,665 | 28,500 | 95 |
| Greater London | United Kingdom | 559,973 | 63,700 | 481,325 | 56,200 | 187 |
| South East England | United Kingdom | 354,922 | 39,300 | 305,073 | 33,900 | 113 |
| South West England | United Kingdom | 174,611 | 31,700 | 150,087 | 27,000 | 90 |
| Wales | United Kingdom | 81,683 | 26,200 | 70,211 | 22,900 | 76 |
| Scotland | United Kingdom | 183,749 | 34,000 | 157,942 | 29,300 | 98 |
| Northern Ireland | United Kingdom | 51,047 | 27,400 | 43,878 | 24,400 | 81 |

== NUTS level 2 ==
| Region | Country | Euro total | Euro per capita | PPS total | PPS per capita | PPS per capita anomaly |
|---|---|---|---|---|---|---|
| Burgenland | Austria | 8,161 | 28,000 | 7,504 | 25,700 | 88 |
| Lower Austria | Austria | 54,962 | 33,100 | 50,537 | 30,400 | 104 |
| Vienna | Austria | 90,110 | 48,600 | 82,855 | 44,700 | 153 |
| Carinthia | Austria | 19,262 | 34,300 | 17,711 | 31,600 | 108 |
| Styria | Austria | 44,283 | 35,800 | 40,717 | 33,000 | 113 |
| Upper Austria | Austria | 59,956 | 41,100 | 55,129 | 37,800 | 129 |
| Salzburg | Austria | 26,683 | 48,700 | 24,534 | 44,800 | 154 |
| Tyrol | Austria | 32,479 | 43,700 | 29,864 | 40,200 | 138 |
| Vorarlberg | Austria | 17,270 | 44,700 | 15,880 | 41,100 | 141 |
| Brussels-Capital Region | Belgium | 75,893 | 63,800 | 69,506 | 58,400 | 200 |
| Antwerpen | Belgium | 80,981 | 44,200 | 74,165 | 40,500 | 139 |
| Limburg | Belgium | 26,708 | 30,900 | 24,460 | 28,300 | 97 |
| East Flanders | Belgium | 52,024 | 34,900 | 47,645 | 31,900 | 110 |
| Flemish Brabant | Belgium | 45,502 | 40,400 | 41,672 | 37,000 | 127 |
| West Flanders | Belgium | 43,537 | 36,800 | 39,872 | 33,700 | 115 |
| Walloon Brabant | Belgium | 16,815 | 42,200 | 15,400 | 38,700 | 133 |
| Hainaut | Belgium | 32,304 | 24,100 | 29,585 | 22,100 | 76 |
| Liège | Belgium | 29,683 | 27,000 | 27,184 | 24,700 | 85 |
| Luxembourg | Belgium | 6,700 | 23,800 | 6,136 | 21,800 | 75 |
| Namur | Belgium | 12 718 | 25,900 | 11,648 | 23,800 | 81 |
| Severozapaden | Bulgaria | 3,183 | 4,100 | 6,676 | 8,600 | 29 |
| Severen tsentralen | Bulgaria | 3,775 | 4,700 | 7,919 | 9,800 | 34 |
| Severoiztochen | Bulgaria | 5,119 | 5,400 | 10,736 | 11,400 | 39 |
| Yugoiztochen | Bulgaria | 6,236 | 5,900 | 13,080 | 12,500 | 43 |
| Yugozapaden | Bulgaria | 23,061 | 10,900 | 48,369 | 22,800 | 78 |
| Yuzhen tsentralen | Bulgaria | 6,754 | 4,700 | 14,166 | 9,900 | 34 |
| Cyprus | Cyprus | 18,123 | 21,300 | 20,499 | 24,100 | 83 |
| Prague | Czech Republic | 44,138 | 34,700 | 67,553 | 53,100 | 182 |
| Central Bohemia | Czech Republic | 20,436 | 15,300 | 31,277 | 23,500 | 80 |
| South West Czech Republic | Czech Republic | 17,849 | 14,700 | 27,318 | 22,500 | 77 |
| North West Czech Republic | Czech Republic | 13,454 | 12,000 | 20,591 | 18,400 | 63 |
| North East Czech Republic | Czech Republic | 20,799 | 13,800 | 31,833 | 21,100 | 72 |
| South East Czech Republic | Czech Republic | 26,034 | 15,400 | 39,845 | 23,600 | 81 |
| Central Moravia | Czech Republic | 16,590 | 13,600 | 25,391 | 20,800 | 71 |
| Moravian-Silesian | Czech Republic | 17,264 | 14,300 | 26,422 | 21,800 | 75 |
| Stuttgart | Germany | 204,521 | 50,000 | 192,957 | 47,200 | 162 |
| Karlsruhe | Germany | 117,154 | 42,300 | 110,530 | 39,900 | 137 |
| Freiburg | Germany | 81,817 | 36,600 | 77,191 | 34,500 | 118 |
| Tübingen | Germany | 75,000 | 41,000 | 70,759 | 38,700 | 133 |
| Upper Bavaria | Germany | 251,517 | 54,600 | 237,296 | 51,500 | 177 |
| Lower Bavaria | Germany | 45,284 | 37,300 | 42,723 | 35,100 | 121 |
| Upper Palatinate | Germany | 43,678 | 39,900 | 41,209 | 37,600 | 129 |
| Upper Franconia | Germany | 37,521 | 35,400 | 35,400 | 33,400 | 115 |
| Middle Franconia | Germany | 72,332 | 41,500 | 68,243 | 39,100 | 134 |
| Lower Franconia | Germany | 49,682 | 38,000 | 46,873 | 35,800 | 123 |
| Swabia | Germany | 70,020 | 37,800 | 66,061 | 35,700 | 122 |
| Berlin | Germany | 129,924 | 36,600 | 122,578 | 34,500 | 118 |
| Brandenburg | Germany | 68,757 | 27,600 | 64,870 | 26,100 | 89 |
| Bremen | Germany | 32,376 | 47,900 | 30,546 | 45,200 | 155 |
| Hamburg | Germany | 111,076 | 61,800 | 104,796 | 58,300 | 200 |
| Darmstadt | Germany | 194,324 | 49,400 | 183,336 | 46,600 | 160 |
| Giessen | Germany | 33,539 | 32,700 | 31,642 | 30,800 | 106 |
| Kassel | Germany | 42,506 | 34,900 | 40,103 | 33,000 | 113 |
| Mecklenburg-Western Pomerania | Germany | 41,580 | 25,800 | 39,229 | 24,400 | 84 |
| Braunschweig | Germany | 58,728 | 36,800 | 55,407 | 34,800 | 119 |
| Hannover | Germany | 79,096 | 35,600 | 71,793 | 33,500 | 115 |
| Lüneburg | Germany | 46,426 | 27,200 | 43,801 | 25,700 | 88 |
| Weser-Ems | Germany | 83,797 | 33,400 | 79,059 | 31,500 | 108 |
| Düsseldorf | Germany | 209,463 | 40,400 | 197,620 | 38,100 | 131 |
| Cologne | Germany | 183,129 | 41,400 | 172,775 | 39,000 | 134 |
| Münster | Germany | 84,151 | 32,100 | 79,393 | 30,300 | 104 |
| Detmold | Germany | 74,854 | 36,400 | 70,621 | 34,400 | 118 |
| Arnsberg | Germany | 120,511 | 33,600 | 113,697 | 31,700 | 109 |
| Koblenz | Germany | 49,228 | 33,000 | 46,444 | 31,100 | 107 |
| Trier | Germany | 15,984 | 30,300 | 15,081 | 28,600 | 98 |
| Rheinhessen-Pfalz | Germany | 74,747 | 36,600 | 70,520 | 34,500 | 118 |
| Saarland | Germany | 35,231 | 35,300 | 33,239 | 33,300 | 114 |
| Dresden | Germany | 47,553 | 29,700 | 44,864 | 28,100 | 96 |
| Chemnitz | Germany | 39,925 | 27,400 | 37,668 | 25,800 | 89 |
| Leipzig | Germany | 31,409 | 30,800 | 29,633 | 29,000 | 100 |
| Saxony-Anhalt | Germany | 59,593 | 26,600 | 56,224 | 25,100 | 86 |
| Schleswig-Holstein | Germany | 89,551 | 31,100 | 84,488 | 29,400 | 101 |
| Thuringia | Germany | 61,064 | 28,300 | 57,611 | 26,700 | 91 |
| Capital Region of Denmark | Denmark | 111,818 | 62,200 | 83,289 | 46,300 | 159 |
| Zealand | Denmark | 28,166 | 33,900 | 20,980 | 25,300 | 87 |
| South Denmark | Denmark | 53,514 | 44,000 | 39,861 | 32,800 | 113 |
| Central Jutland | Denmark | 56,526 | 43,500 | 42,104 | 32,400 | 111 |
| North Jutland | Denmark | 23,765 | 40,600 | 17,702 | 30,200 | 104 |
| Estonia | Estonia | 21,098 | 16,000 | 28,803 | 21,900 | 75 |
| Attica | Greece | 83,469 | 22,100 | 101,711 | 26,900 | 92 |
| North Aegean | Greece | 2,412 | 12,000 | 2,940 | 14,700 | 50 |
| South Aegean | Greece | 5,888 | 17,500 | 7,175 | 21,300 | 73 |
| Crete | Greece | 8,654 | 13,700 | 10,545 | 16,700 | 57 |
| Eastern Macedonia and Thrace | Greece | 6,709 | 11,100 | 8,175 | 13,500 | 46 |
| Central Macedonia | Greece | 23,850 | 12,700 | 29,063 | 15,400 | 53 |
| Western Macedonia | Greece | 3,849 | 14,100 | 5,018 | 17,200 | 59 |
| Epirus | Greece | 3,843 | 11,400 | 4,690 | 13,900 | 48 |
| Thessaly | Greece | 9,006 | 12,400 | 10,974 | 15,100 | 52 |
| Ionian Islands | Greece | 3,064 | 14,900 | 3,733 | 18,100 | 62 |
| Western Greece | Greece | 7,847 | 11,800 | 9,562 | 14,300 | 49 |
| Central Greece | Greece | 7,926 | 14,300 | 9,658 | 17,400 | 60 |
| Peloponnese | Greece | 7,683 | 13,200 | 9,362 | 16,100 | 55 |
| Galicia | Spain | 58,449 | 21,500 | 64,903 | 23,900 | 82 |
| Asturias | Spain | 21,628 | 20,900 | 24,017 | 23,200 | 79 |
| Cantabria | Spain | 12,543 | 21,600 | 13,928 | 24,000 | 82 |
| Basque Country | Spain | 68,817 | 31,800 | 76,417 | 35,300 | 121 |
| Navarre | Spain | 19,152 | 30,000 | 21,268 | 33,300 | 114 |
| La Rioja | Spain | 7,915 | 25,300 | 8,789 | 28,100 | 96 |
| Aragon | Spain | 34,368 | 26,100 | 38,164 | 29,000 | 99 |
| Community of Madrid | Spain | 211,528 | 32,800 | 234,888 | 36,400 | 125 |
| Castile and León | Spain | 55,533 | 22,700 | 61,666 | 25,200 | 87 |
| Castilla-La Mancha | Spain | 38,505 | 18,800 | 42,757 | 20,900 | 72 |
| Extremadura | Spain | 17,902 | 16,600 | 19,879 | 18,400 | 63 |
| Catalonia | Spain | 213,766 | 28,800 | 237,373 | 32,000 | 110 |
| Valencian Community | Spain | 104,632 | 21,200 | 116,187 | 23,600 | 81 |
| Balearic Islands | Spain | 28,651 | 25,100 | 31,815 | 27,800 | 95 |
| Andalucia | Spain | 149,515 | 17,800 | 166,027 | 19,800 | 68 |
| Region of Murcia | Spain | 29,171 | 19,900 | 32,393 | 22,100 | 76 |
| Ceuta | Spain | 1,628 | 19,200 | 1,808 | 21,300 | 73 |
| Melilla | Spain | 1,490 | 17,600 | 1,655 | 19,500 | 67 |
| Canary Islands | Spain | 42,460 | 19,800 | 47,149 | 22,000 | 75 |
| European Union | | 14,907,852 | 29,200 | 14,907,852 | 29,200 | 100 |
| West Finland | Finland | 48,084 | 34,800 | 39,096 | 28,300 | 97 |
| Helsinki-Uusimaa | Finland | 84,005 | 51,600 | 68,302 | 41,900 | 144 |
| South Finland | Finland | 40,159 | 34,600 | 32,652 | 28,200 | 97 |
| North & East Finland | Finland | 41,942 | 32,300 | 34,102 | 26,300 | 90 |
| Åland | Finland | 1,368 | 47,000 | 1,112 | 38,200 | 131 |
| Île de France | France | 680,717 | 56,000 | 621,625 | 51,100 | 175 |
| Champagne-Ardenne | France | 35,891 | 26,900 | 32,775 | 24,500 | 84 |
| Picardy | France | 48,396 | 25,000 | 44,195 | 22,900 | 78 |
| Upper Normandy | France | 53,235 | 28,600 | 48,614 | 26,100 | 89 |
| Centre-Val de Loire | France | 70,938 | 27,500 | 64,780 | 25,100 | 86 |
| Lower Normandy | France | 39,028 | 26,400 | 35,640 | 24,100 | 83 |
| Burgundy | France | 44,176 | 27,000 | 40,341 | 24,600 | 84 |
| Nord-Pas-de-Calais | France | 108,597 | 26,600 | 99,170 | 24,300 | 83 |
| Lorraine | France | 60,280 | 25,800 | 55,047 | 23,600 | 81 |
| Alsace | France | 57 177 | 30,300 | 52,213 | 27,700 | 95 |
| Franche-Comté | France | 30,765 | 26,100 | 28,094 | 23,800 | 82 |
| Pays de la Loire | France | 111,129 | 29,600 | 101,482 | 27,000 | 93 |
| Brittany | France | 94,270 | 28,400 | 86,087 | 26,000 | 89 |
| Poitou-Charentes | France | 47,267 | 26,100 | 43,164 | 23,900 | 82 |
| Aquitaine | France | 100,864 | 29,600 | 92,108 | 27,000 | 93 |
| Midi-Pyrénées | France | 92,816 | 30,600 | 84,758 | 27,900 | 96 |
| Limousin | France | 19,844 | 26,900 | 18,122 | 24,600 | 84 |
| Rhône-Alpes | France | 216,502 | 32,800 | 197,708 | 30,000 | 103 |
| Auvergne | France | 38,587 | 28,300 | 35,238 | 25,800 | 89 |
| Languedoc-Roussillon | France | 68,417 | 24,400 | 62,478 | 22,300 | 76 |
| Provence-Alpes-Côte d'Azur | France | 155,161 | 30,800 | 141,692 | 28,100 | 96 |
| Corsica | France | 9,097 | 27,400 | 8,307 | 25,000 | 86 |
| Guadeloupe | France | 9,314 | 21,600 | 8,505 | 19,800 | 68 |
| Martinique | France | 9,118 | 24,200 | 8,326 | 22,100 | 76 |
| French Guiana | France | 4,390 | 16,200 | 4,009 | 14,800 | 51 |
| Réunion | France | 19,228 | 22,400 | 17,559 | 20,500 | 70 |
| Mayotte | France | 2,592 | 10,600 | 2,367 | 9,700 | 33 |
| Adriatic Croatia | Croatia | 14,759 | 10,600 | 23,179 | 16,700 | 57 |
| Continental Croatia | Croatia | 31,623 | 11,400 | 49,665 | 17,900 | 61 |
| Central Hungary | Hungary | 52,685 | 17,600 | 89,339 | 29,800 | 102 |
| Central Transdanubia | Hungary | 11,631 | 11,100 | 19,723 | 18,600 | 64 |
| Western Transdanubia | Hungary | 12,481 | 12,700 | 21,164 | 21,500 | 74 |
| Southern Transdanubia | Hungary | 6,849 | 7,600 | 11,614 | 12,900 | 44 |
| Northern Hungary | Hungary | 8,832 | 7,700 | 14,976 | 13,000 | 45 |
| Northern Great Plain | Hungary | 10,854 | 7,400 | 18,405 | 12,500 | 43 |
| Southern Great Plain | Hungary | 10,400 | 8,300 | 17,635 | 14,000 | 48 |
| Border, Midland and Western | Ireland (2014) | 33,777 | 27,600 | 30,625 | 25,000 | 86 |
| Southern and Eastern Ireland | Ireland (2014) | 241,790 | 69,900 | 219,223 | 63,400 | 217 |
| Piedmont | Italy | 129,322 | 29,400 | 131,753 | 30,000 | 103 |
| Aosta Valley | Italy | 4,436 | 34,900 | 4,520 | 35,600 | 122 |
| Liguria | Italy | 48,287 | 30,800 | 49,194 | 31,400 | 108 |
| Lombardy | Italy | 366,541 | 36,600 | 373,430 | 37,300 | 128 |
| Abruzzo | Italy | 31,959 | 24,100 | 32,560 | 24,600 | 84 |
| Molise | Italy | 6,233 | 20,000 | 6,350 | 20,400 | 70 |
| Campania | Italy | 106,753 | 18,300 | 108,760 | 18,600 | 62 |
| Apulia | Italy | 72,406 | 17,800 | 73,767 | 18,100 | 62 |
| Basilicata | Italy | 11,782 | 20,600 | 12,003 | 21,000 | 72 |
| Calabria | Italy | 33,054 | 16,800 | 33,676 | 17,100 | 59 |
| Sicily | Italy | 86,998 | 17,200 | 88,633 | 17,500 | 60 |
| Sardinia | Italy | 33,556 | 20,300 | 34,186 | 20,600 | 71 |
| South Tyrol | Italy | 22,272 | 42,600 | 22,691 | 43,400 | 149 |
| Trentino | Italy | 18,832 | 35,000 | 19,186 | 35,600 | 122 |
| Veneto | Italy | 155,515 | 31,700 | 158,438 | 32,300 | 111 |
| Friuli-Venezia Giulia | Italy | 36,935 | 30,300 | 37,629 | 30,900 | 106 |
| Emilia-Romagna | Italy | 153,997 | 34,600 | 156,892 | 35,300 | 121 |
| Tuscany | Italy | 112,239 | 30,000 | 114,349 | 30,500 | 105 |
| Umbria | Italy | 21,341 | 24,000 | 21,742 | 24,400 | 84 |
| Marche | Italy | 40,988 | 26,600 | 41,758 | 27,100 | 93 |
| Lazio | Italy | 185,935 | 31,600 | 189,430 | 32,100 | 110 |
| Lithuania | Lithuania | 38,668 | 13,500 | 63,038 | 22,000 | 75 |
| Luxembourg | Luxembourg | 53,005 | 90,700 | 43,859 | 75,100 | 257 |
| Latvia | Latvia | 24,927 | 12,700 | 36,850 | 18,800 | 65 |
| Republic of Macedonia | Macedonia (2014) | 8,529 | 4,100 | 20,877 | 10,100 | 37 |
| Malta | Malta | 9,927 | 22,700 | 12,170 | 27,900 | 96 |
| Groningen | Netherlands | 24,102 | 41,300 | 21,729 | 37,200 | 128 |
| Friesland | Netherlands | 18,581 | 28,800 | 16,751 | 25,900 | 89 |
| Drenthe | Netherlands | 14,119 | 28,800 | 12,729 | 26,000 | 89 |
| Overijssel | Netherlands | 39,059 | 34,100 | 35,212 | 30,700 | 105 |
| Gelderland | Netherlands | 70,789 | 34,700 | 63,819 | 31,300 | 107 |
| Flevoland | Netherlands | 12,959 | 31,900 | 11,683 | 28,800 | 99 |
| Utrecht | Netherlands | 61,452 | 48,000 | 55,400 | 43,300 | 149 |
| North Holland | Netherlands | 148,243 | 53,000 | 133,645 | 47,800 | 164 |
| South Holland | Netherlands | 150,675 | 41,400 | 135,837 | 37,400 | 128 |
| Zeeland | Netherlands | 12,242 | 32,100 | 11,036 | 29,000 | 99 |
| North Brabant | Netherlands | 107,888 | 43,100 | 97,264 | 38,800 | 133 |
| Limburg | Netherlands | 39,329 | 35,200 | 35,456 | 31,700 | 109 |
| Łódź | Poland | 26,113 | 10,500 | 46,246 | 18,500 | 64 |
| Mazovia | Poland | 95,160 | 17,800 | 168,526 | 31,600 | 109 |
| Małopolska | Poland | 33,947 | 10,100 | 60,119 | 17,800 | 62 |
| Silesia | Poland | 53,286 | 11,600 | 94,369 | 20,600 | 71 |
| Lublin | Poland | 16,424 | 7,700 | 29,086 | 13,600 | 47 |
| Podkarpackie | Poland | 16,803 | 7,900 | 29,758 | 14,000 | 48 |
| Świętokrzyskie | Poland | 10,201 | 8,100 | 18,066 | 14,300 | 50 |
| Podlaskie | Poland | 9,453 | 7,900 | 16,741 | 14,100 | 49 |
| Greater Poland Voivodeship | Poland | 42,236 | 12,200 | 74,799 | 21,500 | 75 |
| West Pomerania | Poland | 16,259 | 9,500 | 28,794 | 16,800 | 58 |
| Lubuskie | Poland | 9,513 | 9,300 | 16,847 | 16,500 | 57 |
| Lower Silesia | Poland | 36,197 | 12,500 | 64,104 | 22,100 | 76 |
| Opole | Poland | 9,022 | 9,000 | 15,978 | 16,000 | 55 |
| Kujawy-Pomerania | Poland | 19,031 | 9,100 | 33,704 | 16,100 | 56 |
| Warmia-Masuria | Poland | 11,442 | 7,900 | 20,263 | 14,100 | 49 |
| Pomerania | Poland | 24,707 | 10,700 | 43,755 | 19,000 | 66 |
| North Portugal | Portugal | 52,926 | 14,600 | 67,688 | 18,700 | 65 |
| Algarve | Portugal | 7,856 | 17,800 | 10,047 | 22,700 | 79 |
| Central Portugal | Portugal | 33,962 | 15,000 | 43,434 | 19,200 | 67 |
| Lisbon metropolitan area | Portugal | 65,344 | 23,200 | 83,568 | 29,700 | 103 |
| Alentejo | Portugal | 11,465 | 15,700 | 14,663 | 20,100 | 70 |
| Azores | Portugal | 3,785 | 15,400 | 4,841 | 19,700 | 68 |
| Madeira | Portugal | 4,159 | 16,100 | 5,319 | 20,700 | 72 |
| North West Romania | Romania | 18,267 | 7,100 | 37,254 | 14,400 | 50 |
| Central Romania | Romania | 17,368 | 7,400 | 35,420 | 15,100 | 52 |
| North East Romania | Romania | 15,864 | 4,900 | 32,353 | 9,900 | 34 |
| South East Romania | Romania | 17,772 | 7,200 | 36,244 | 14,600 | 51 |
| South - Muntenia | Romania | 20,404 | 6,700 | 41,613 | 13,700 | 47 |
| Bucharest - Ilfov | Romania | 44,154 | 19,300 | 90,048 | 39,400 | 136 |
| South West Oltenia | Romania | 11,382 | 5,700 | 23,212 | 11,600 | 40 |
| West Romania | Romania | 14,655 | 8,100 | 29,887 | 16,500 | 57 |
| Stockholm County | Sweden | 142,329 | 64,300 | 111,393 | 50,300 | 174 |
| East Middle Sweden | Sweden | 63,675 | 39,100 | 49,835 | 30,600 | 106 |
| Småland and the islands | Sweden | 31,817 | 38,300 | 24,902 | 30,000 | 104 |
| South Sweden | Sweden | 55,913 | 38,500 | 43,760 | 30,200 | 104 |
| West Sweden | Sweden | 87,277 | 44,700 | 68,307 | 35,000 | 121 |
| North Middle Sweden | Sweden | 30,394 | 36,400 | 23,788 | 28,500 | 99 |
| Middle Norrland | Sweden | 14,484 | 39,000 | 11,336 | 30,600 | 106 |
| Upper Norrland | Sweden | 21,020 | 41,000 | 16,451 | 32,100 | 111 |
| Eastern Slovenia | Slovenia | 16,930 | 15,500 | 21,615 | 19,800 | 69 |
| Western Slovenia | Slovenia | 21,640 | 22,300 | 27,627 | 28,500 | 99 |
| Bratislava Region | Slovakia | 22,238 | 35,400 | 34,225 | 54,400 | 188 |
| Western Slovakia | Slovakia | 24,540 | 13,400 | 37,767 | 20,600 | 71 |
| Central Slovakia | Slovakia | 15,560 | 11,600 | 23,947 | 17,800 | 62 |
| Eastern Slovakia | Slovakia | 16,347 | 10,100 | 25,158 | 15,600 | 54 |
| Tees Valley and Durham | United Kingdom | 32,010 | 27,000 | 25,195 | 21,200 | 74 |
| Northumberland and Tyne and Wear | United Kingdom | 44,885 | 31,200 | 35,329 | 24,600 | 85 |
| Cumbria | United Kingdom | 17,336 | 34,800 | 13,645 | 27,400 | 95 |
| Greater Manchester | United Kingdom | 92,261 | 33,500 | 72,620 | 26,300 | 91 |
| Lancashire | United Kingdom | 44,908 | 30,400 | 35,347 | 23,900 | 83 |
| Cheshire | United Kingdom | 42,722 | 46,600 | 33,627 | 36,700 | 127 |
| Merseyside | United Kingdom | 45,587 | 29,900 | 35,882 | 23,500 | 81 |
| East Yorkshire and Northern Lincolnshire | United Kingdom | 27,555 | 29,800 | 21,689 | 23,400 | 81 |
| North Yorkshire | United Kingdom | 28,835 | 35,600 | 22,696 | 28,100 | 97 |
| South Yorkshire | United Kingdom | 37,636 | 27,400 | 29,624 | 21,500 | 75 |
| West Yorkshire | United Kingdom | 75,780 | 33,200 | 59,647 | 26,100 | 91 |
| Derbyshire and Nottinghamshire | United Kingdom | 68,245 | 31,600 | 53,716 | 24,900 | 86 |
| Leicestershire, Rutland and Northamptonshire | United Kingdom | 61,804 | 34,700 | 48,647 | 27,300 | 95 |
| Lincolnshire | United Kingdom | 21,467 | 29,100 | 16,897 | 22,900 | 79 |
| Herefordshire, Worcestershire and Warwickshire | United Kingdom | 47,671 | 36,100 | 37,522 | 28,400 | 98 |
| Shropshire and Staffordshire | United Kingdom | 45,863 | 28,700 | 36,099 | 22,600 | 78 |
| West Midlands | United Kingdom | 91,851 | 32,400 | 72,297 | 25,500 | 88 |
| East Anglia | United Kingdom | 92,347 | 37,400 | 72,687 | 29,500 | 102 |
| Bedfordshire and Hertfordshire | United Kingdom | 74,198 | 40,700 | 58,402 | 32,100 | 111 |
| Essex | United Kingdom | 58,902 | 33,000 | 46,362 | 25,900 | 90 |
| Inner London - West | United Kingdom | 243,454 | 212,800 | 191,625 | 167,500 | 580 |
| Inner London - East | United Kingdom | 149,625 | 64,300 | 117,771 | 50,600 | 175 |
| Outer London - East and North East | United Kingdom | 53,350 | 28,600 | 41,992 | 22,500 | 78 |
| Outer London - South | United Kingdom | 44,241 | 34,500 | 34,822 | 27,200 | 94 |
| Outer London - West and North West | United Kingdom | 95,075 | 46,300 | 74,835 | 36,400 | 126 |
| Berkshire, Buckinghamshire and Oxfordshire | United Kingdom | 129,785 | 55,000 | 102,154 | 43,300 | 150 |
| Surrey, East and West Sussex | United Kingdom | 119,665 | 42,200 | 94,189 | 33,200 | 115 |
| Hampshire and Isle of Wight | United Kingdom | 77,753 | 39,800 | 61,200 | 31,300 | 108 |
| Kent | United Kingdom | 58,483 | 32,500 | 46,032 | 25,600 | 89 |
| Gloucestershire, Wiltshire and Bristol/Bath area | United Kingdom | 100,707 | 41,300 | 79,267 | 32,500 | 113 |
| Dorset and Somerset | United Kingdom | 43,202 | 33,000 | 34,005 | 25,900 | 90 |
| Cornwall and Isles of Scilly | United Kingdom | 15,341 | 27,800 | 12,075 | 21,900 | 76 |
| Devon | United Kingdom | 35,790 | 30,600 | 28,170 | 24,100 | 83 |
| West Wales and the Valleys | United Kingdom | 48,490 | 22,000 | 36,779 | 18,900 | 69 |
| East Wales | United Kingdom | 37,862 | 28,900 | 28,389 | 24,800 | 90 |
| Eastern Scotland | United Kingdom | 74,193 | 35,900 | 58,398 | 28,200 | 98 |
| South Western Scotland | United Kingdom | 79,009 | 33,700 | 62,188 | 26,500 | 92 |
| North Eastern Scotland | United Kingdom | 27,987 | 56,900 | 22,029 | 44,800 | 155 |
| Highlands and Islands | United Kingdom | 15,791 | 33,700 | 12,429 | 26,600 | 92 |
| Northern Ireland | United Kingdom | 53,262 | 28,800 | 41,923 | 22,600 | 78 |

== See also ==
- Economy of the European Union
- List of metropolitan areas in the European Union by GDP
- List of European regions by GDP
