= Nomenclature of Territorial Units for Statistics =

European Union standard for country subdivisions

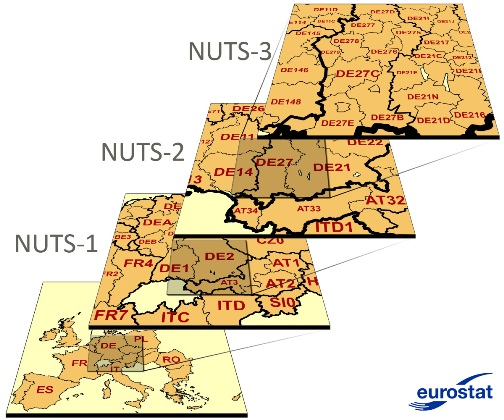
A diagram of the three main divisions of the NUTS system developed by Eurostat

Nomenclature of Territorial Units for Statistics (French: Nomenclature des unités territoriales statistiques; NUTS) is a geocode standard for referencing the administrative divisions of countries for statistical purposes. The standard, adopted in 2003, is developed and regulated by the European Union (EU), and thus covers only the EU member states in detail. The Nomenclature of Territorial Units for Statistics is instrumental in the European Union's Structural Funds and Cohesion Fund delivery mechanisms and for locating the area where goods and services subject to European public procurement legislation are to be delivered.

For each EU member country, a hierarchy of three NUTS levels is established by Eurostat in agreement with each member state; the subdivisions in some levels do not necessarily correspond to administrative divisions within the country. A NUTS code begins with a two-letter code referencing the country, as abbreviated in the European Union's Interinstitutional Style Guide. The subdivision of the country is then referred to with one number. A second or third subdivision level is referred to with another number each. Each numbering starts with 1, as 0 is used for the upper level. Where the subdivision has more than nine entities, capital letters are used to continue the numbering. Below the three NUTS levels are local administrative units (LAUs). A similar statistical system is defined for the candidate countries and members of the European Free Trade Association, but they are not part of NUTS governed by the regulations.

The current NUTS classification, dated 21 November 2016 and effective from 1 January 2018 (now updated to current members as of 2020), lists 92 regions at NUTS 1, 244 regions at NUTS 2, 1215 regions at NUTS 3 level, and 99,387 local administrative units (LAUs).

== National structures ==
Not all countries have every level of division, depending on their size. For example, Luxembourg and Cyprus only have local administrative units (LAUs); the three NUTS divisions each correspond to the entire country itself.

=== Member states ===
Countries		NUTS 1		NUTS 2		NUTS 3		Local administrative units (LAU)	
Member State	27		92		240		1,164		92,054
Austria	AT	Groups of states	3	States	9	Groups of districts	35	Municipalities (Gemeinden)	2,093
Belgium	BE	Regions	3	Provinces (+ Brussels)	11	Arrondissements (Verviers split into two)	44	Municipalities (gemeenten / communes)	581
Bulgaria	BG	—	1	Planning regions	4	Oblasts	28	Municipalities (общини, obshtini)	265
Croatia	HR	—	1	Regions	4	Counties (županije) + Zagreb	21	Municipalities (općine)	556
Cyprus	CY	—	1	—	1	—	1	Municipalities, communities (δήμοι, κοινότητες, dimoi, koinotites)	538
Czech Republic	CZ	—	1	Statistical areas	8	Administrative regions (kraje)	14	Municipalities (obce)	6,258
Denmark	DK	—	1	Regions (Regioner)	5	Provinces (Landsdele)	11	Municipalities (kommuner) and 1 unincorporated area	99
Estonia	EE	—	1	—	1	Groups of counties	5	Municipalities (Vald, linn)	79
Finland	FI	Mainland Finland, Åland	2	Large areas (Suuralueet / Storområden)	5	Regions (Maakunnat / Landskap)	19	Municipalities (kunnat / kommuner)	309
France	FR	Regions + DOM	14	Former regions (1982–2015) + DOM	27	Departments + DOM	101	Communes	34,936
Germany	DE	States (Bundesland)	16	Inconsistent, some whole States (Bundesland), some Government regions (Regierungsbezirk) (or equivalent, or dissolved)	38	Districts (Kreis)	401	Municipalities (Gemeinden)	10,957
Greece	EL (Note: The European Union uses EL as the country code for Greece instead of the ISO 3166-1 alpha-2 code GR.)	Groups of development regions	4	Regions	13	Prefectures	52	Municipal districts/Community districts (δημοτικό διαμέρισμα, κοινότικο διαμέρισμα, demotiko diamerisma, koinotiko diamerisma)	6,142
Hungary	HU	Statistical large regions (statisztikai nagyrégiók)	3	Planning and statistical regions (tervezési-statisztikai régió)	8	Counties (vármegye) + Budapest	20	Settlements (települések)	3,155
Ireland	IE	—	1	Regions	3	Regional Authority Regions	8	Local electoral areas	166
Italy	IT	Groups of regions	5	Regions (Trentino-Alto Adige split into two)	21	Provinces Metropolitan Cities	110	Municipalities (comuni)	7,896
Latvia	LV	—	1	—	1	Statistical regions	5	Municipalities, state cities (valstspilsētas, novadi)	43
Lithuania	LT	—	1	Regions	2	Counties	10	Municipalities (savivaldybės)	60
Luxembourg	LU	—	1	—	1	—	1	Communes (French: communes, German: Gemeinden, Luxembourgish: Gemengen)	100
Malta	MT	—	1	—	1	Islands	2	Local councils (kunsilli)	68
Netherlands	NL	Groups of provinces	4	Provinces	12	COROP regions	40	Municipalities (gemeenten)	342
Poland	PL	Macroregions (Makroregiony)	7	Voivodeships + Warsaw metro	17	Subregions (Podregiony)	74	Municipalities (gminy)	2,477
Portugal	PT	Continent + Azores + Madeira	3	Statistical regions + autonomous regions	9	Groups of municipalities	26	Municipalities (concelhos)	3,092
Romania	RO	Macroregions	4	Regions	8	Counties + Bucharest	42	Communes + Municipalities + Cities (comune + municipii + orașe)	3,181
Slovakia	SK	—	1	Oblasts	4	Regions (Kraje)	8	Municipalities (obce)	2,927
Slovenia	SI	—	1	Macroregions	2	Statistical regions	12	Municipalities (občine)	212
Spain	ES	Groups of autonomous communities	7	17 Autonomous communities and 2 autonomous cities	19	Provinces + Islands + Ceuta and Melilla	59	Municipalities (municipios)	8,132
Sweden	SE	Regions (Grupper av riksområden)	3	National Areas (Riksområde)	8	Counties (Län)	21	Municipalities (kommuner)	290

=== Candidate countries and potential candidates ===
Country		NUTS 1		NUTS 2		NUTS 3		LAU	
Countries	10		28		66		272		3,094
Albania	AL	—	1	Statistical regions (rajoneve statistikore)	3	Counties (qarqe)	12	Municipalities (bashki)	61
Bosnia and Herzegovina	BA	—	1	Administrative statistical territorial unit	3	Not yet agreed*			
Georgia	GE	Not yet agreed*							
Kosovo	XK	—	1	—	1	Regions (Albanian: rajone; Serbo-Croatian: окрузи, okruzi)	7	Municipalities (Albanian: komuna; Serbo-Croatian: општина, opština)	38
Moldova	MD	Not yet agreed*							
Montenegro	ME	—	1	—	1	—	1	Settlements (насеља, naselja)	—
North Macedonia	MK	—	1	—	1	Statistical regions (статистички региони, statistički regioni)	8	Municipalities (општини, opštini)	80
Serbia	RS	Groups of regions (групе региона, grupe regiona)	2	Regions (региони, regioni)	4	Districts (окрузи, okruzi)	25	Municipalities (општине и градови, opštine i gradovi)	168
Turkey	TR	Regions (bölgeler)	12	Sub-regions (alt bölgeler)	26	Provinces (iller)	81	Districts (ilçeler)	973
Ukraine	UA	Macroregions (макрорегіони, makroregiony)	9	Regions (області, oblasti)	27	Districts (райони, raioni)	138	Hromadas (громади)	1774

* Georgia and Moldova have not been updated yet to Eurostat at any NUTS level; Bosnia and Herzegovina has been updated up to NUTS2 level, however the Federation of Bosnia and Herzegovina intends to use cantons as NUTS3 and the Republika Srpska its statistical regions.

=== EFTA countries ===
Country		NUTS 1		NUTS 2		NUTS 3		LAU	
EFTA countries	4		4		13		46		2,562
Switzerland	CH	—	1	Regions (German: grossregionen; French: grandes régions; Italian: grandi regioni)	7	Cantons (German: kantone; French: cantons; Italian: cantoni)	26	Municipalities (German: gemeinden; French: communes; Italian: comuni)	2131
Iceland	IS	—	1	—	1	Statistical areas (hagskýrslusvæði)	2	Municipalities (sveitarfélag)	63
Liechtenstein	LI	—	1	—	1	—	1	Municipalities (gemeinden)	11
Norway	NO	—	1	Regions (landsdeler)	5	Counties (fylker)	17	Municipalities (kommuner)	357

=== Former EU member state ===
Country		NUTS 1		NUTS 2		NUTS 3		LAU	
United Kingdom	UK (Note: The European Union uses UK as the country code for the United Kingdom instead of the ISO 3166-1 alpha-2 code GB.)	Regions of England	9	Sub-Regions: groups of counties; individual counties; groups of London boroughs	30	Upper tier authorities and groups of unitary authorities and districts	93	Districts or unitary authorities	326
United Kingdom	UK	Wales	1	Groups of Principal areas	2	Groups of Principal areas	12	Principal areas	22
United Kingdom	UK	Scotland	1	Groups of Council and/or Island Areas	4	Groups of Council Areas or Islands Areas	23	Council areas, subdivided by LEC where applicable	41
United Kingdom	UK	Northern Ireland	1	—	1	Groups of districts	5	Districts	11

== Maps ==
NUTS 1 in Europe

NUTS 2 in Europe

NUTS 3 in Europe

== Establishment ==
NUTS regions are generally based on existing national administrative subdivisions. In countries where only one or two regional subdivisions exist, or where the population of existing subdivisions is too small or too large, a second and/or third level is created. This may be on the first level (ex. France, Italy, Greece, and Spain), on the second (ex. Germany) and/or third level (ex. Belgium). In countries with small populations, where the entire country would be placed on the NUTS 2 or even NUTS 3 level (ex. Luxembourg, Cyprus), the regions at levels 1, 2 and 3 are identical to each other (and also to the entire country), but are coded with the appropriate length codes levels 1, 2 and 3.

The NUTS system favors existing administrative units, with one or more assigned to each NUTS level. Specific guidelines are based in population, leaving little or no role for other types of variables such as area, distance, topography, levels of jurisdiction or history, which can only be considered in (unspecified) types of special cases. From the NUTS Regulation, the average population size of the regions in the respective level shall lie within the following thresholds:

NUTS 3 regions by population

Level	Minimum	Maximum
NUTS 1	3 million	7 million
NUTS 2	800,000	3 million
NUTS 3	150,000	800,000

For non-administrative units, deviations from these population marks exist for particular geographical, socio-economic, historical, cultural or environmental circumstances, especially for islands and outermost regions.

== Examples ==
- IT: Italy
  - ITC: Northwest Italy
    - ITC1: Piedmont
      - ITC11: Metropolitan City of Turin

== See also ==
- ISO 3166
- ISO 3166-1
- ISO 3166-2
- List of FIPS region codes
- List of metropolitan areas in Europe by population
  - List of metropolitan areas (LUZ) in the European Union
  - List of the largest urban areas of the European Union
- List of European regions by GDP
- Regions of the European Union
- International Territorial Level, the post-Brexit equivalent for NUTS in the United Kingdom
