= List of NUTS-3 regions in EU with GDP per capita over 100,000 EUR =

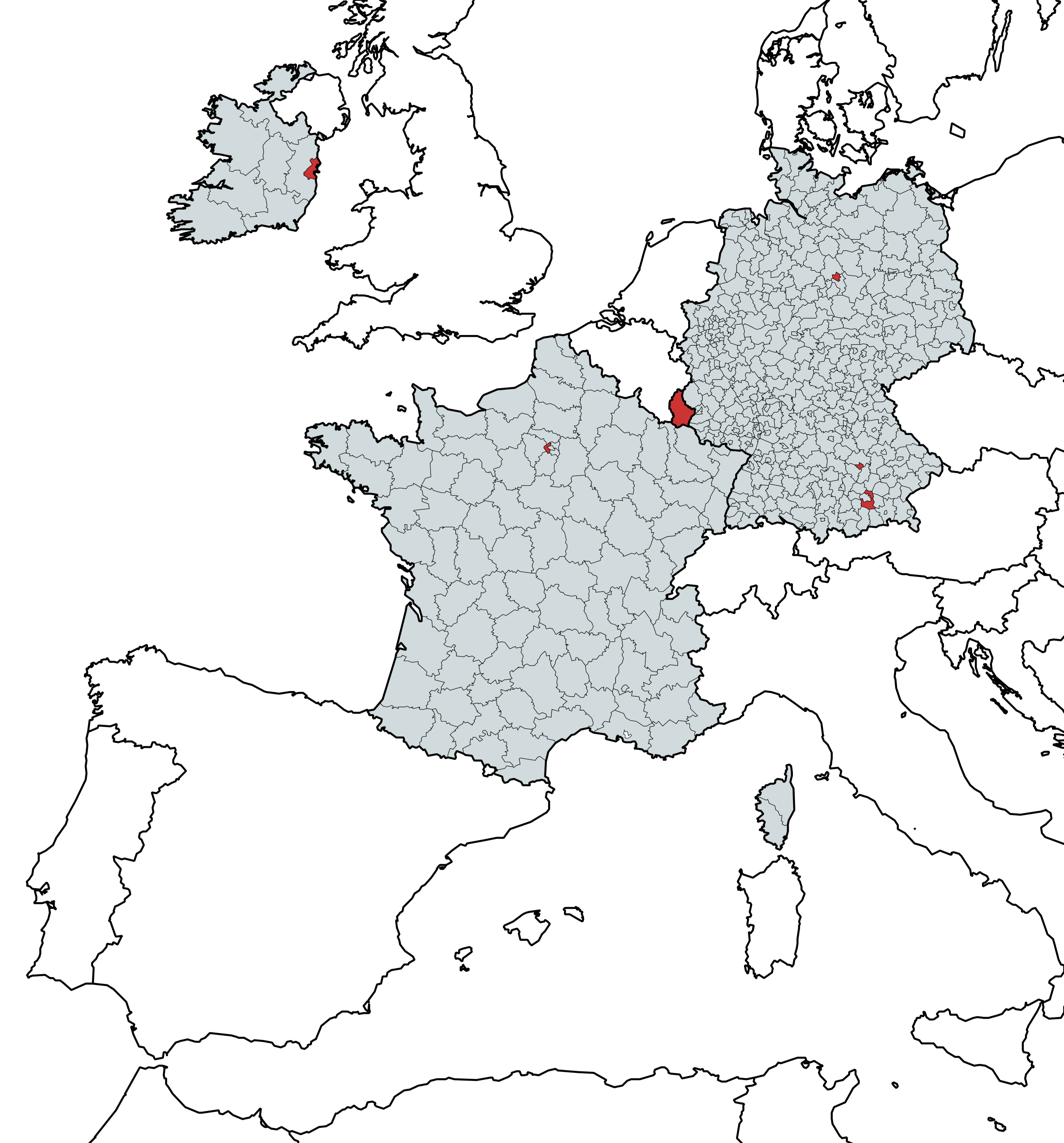
NUTS-3 regions in EU with GDP per capita over 100,000 EUR

This is a list of NUTS-3 regions in EU which have a Nominal gross domestic product (GDP) per capita over €100,000.

Rank	Region	Country	GDP per capita EUR
1	Wolfsburg	Germany	182,300
2	Ingolstadt	Germany	129,900
3	Luxembourg	Luxembourg	114,370
4	Dublin	Ireland	107,808
5	Hauts-de-Seine	France	103,900
6	Munich (district)	Germany	100,600

== See also ==
- List of European regions by GDP
- List of NUTS regions in the European Union by GDP
- List of countries by GDP (nominal) per capita
