= NUTS statistical regions of Kosovo =

The Nomenclature of Territorial Units for Statistics (NUTS) is a geographical standard used by Kosovo in order to divide its territory into regions at three different levels of specified classes of its population. Kosovo is a recognised potential candidate country for membership of the European Union (EU) and thus part of the classification. The three hierarchical levels are known as NUTS-1, NUTS-2 and NUTS-3, moving from larger to smaller territorial divisions. Kosovo is divided into its 7 district at the NUT3 level.

== Overall ==
Level	Division	#
NUTS 1	Kosovo	
NUTS 2	Kosovo	1
NUTS 3	Districts of Pristina, Mitrovica, Peja, Prizren, Ferizaj, Gjilan, Gjakova	7

== Regions ==
The NUTS codes are as follows:

NUTS-1	Code	NUTS-2	Code	NUTS-3	Code
Kosovo	XK0				
Kosovo	XK0	Kosovo	XK00	Pristina	XK001
Kosovo	XK0	Kosovo	XK00	Mitrovica	XK002
Kosovo	XK0	Kosovo	XK00	Peja	XK003
Kosovo	XK0	Kosovo	XK00	Prizren	XK004
Kosovo	XK0	Kosovo	XK00	Ferizaj	XK005
Kosovo	XK0	Kosovo	XK00	Gjilan	XK006
Kosovo	XK0	Kosovo	XK00	Gjakova	XK007
