= List of Finnish regions by Human Development Index =

This is a list of NUTS2 statistical regions of Finland by Human Development Index as of 2023.

Rank	Region	HDI (2023)
Very high human development
1	Helsinki-Uusimaa	0.967
–	Finland (average)	0.948
2	Åland	0.948
3	West (Central Finland, South Ostrobothnia, Ostrobothnia, Satakunta, Pirkanmaa)	0.941
4	South (Southwest Finland, Kanta-Häme, Päijät-Häme, Kymenlaakso, South Karelia)	0.938
5	North & East (South Savo, North Savo, North Karelia, Kainuu, Central Ostrobothnia, North Ostrobothnia, Lapland)	0.935
