= ISO 3166-2:ES =

Entry for Spain in ISO 3166-2

ISO 3166-2:ES is the entry for Spain in ISO 3166-2, part of the ISO 3166 standard published by the International Organization for Standardization (ISO), which defines codes for the names of the principal subdivisions (e.g., provinces or states) of all countries coded in ISO 3166-1.

Currently for Spain, ISO 3166-2 codes are defined for two levels of subdivisions:

- 17 autonomous communities and two autonomous cities in North Africa
- 50 provinces

Each code consists of two parts, separated by a hyphen. The first part is ES, the ISO 3166-1 alpha-2 code of Spain. The second part is one or two letters. For the provinces, the letters were originally used in vehicle registration plates. The codes for the following provinces are based on the names of their capital cities rather than their own names:

- Álava/Araba (ES-VI): Vitoria
- Asturias (ES-O): Oviedo
- Illes Balears (ES-PM): Palma
- Cantabria (ES-S): Santander
- Gipuzkoa (ES-SS): San Sebastián
- La Rioja (ES-LO): Logroño
- Las Palmas (ES-GC): Las Palmas de Gran Canaria
- Bizkaia (ES-BI): Bilbao

== Current codes ==
Subdivision names are listed as in the ISO 3166-2 standard published by the ISO 3166 Maintenance Agency (ISO 3166/MA).

ISO 639-1 codes are used to represent subdivision names in the following administrative languages:

- (es): Spanish
- (eu): Basque
- (ca): Catalan
- (gl): Galician

Except where noted, the names given are in Spanish (Castilian). In autonomous communities and provinces where any of the regional languages is the sole official language of toponymy, the Spanish name is given in square brackets for information. In subdivisions where both a regional language and Spanish are co-official languages of toponymy, both names are listed vertically.

=== Autonomous communities; autonomous cities in Spain ===
Code	Subdivision name (es) (Note: Name is in Spanish (es) except where noted.)	Subdivision name (en) (Note: For reference only, English name not included in the ISO 3166-2 standard.)	Subdivision category
ES-AN	Andalucía	Andalusia	autonomous community
ES-AR	Aragón	Aragon	autonomous community
ES-AS	Asturias, Principado de	Principality of Asturias	autonomous community
ES-CN	Canarias	Canary Islands	autonomous community
ES-CB	Cantabria	Cantabria	autonomous community
ES-CL	Castilla y León	Castile and León	autonomous community
ES-CM	Castilla-La Mancha	Castile-La Mancha	autonomous community
ES-CT	Catalunya (ca) [Cataluña]	Catalonia	autonomous community
ES-CE	Ceuta	Ceuta	autonomous city in North Africa
ES-EX	Extremadura	Extremadura	autonomous community
ES-GA	Galicia (gl) [Galicia]	Galicia	autonomous community
ES-IB	Illes Balears (ca) [Islas Baleares]	Balearic Islands	autonomous community
ES-RI	La Rioja	La Rioja	autonomous community
ES-MD	Madrid, Comunidad de	Community of Madrid	autonomous community
ES-ML	Melilla	Melilla	autonomous city in North Africa
ES-MC	Murcia, Región de	Region of Murcia	autonomous community
ES-NC	Navarra, Comunidad Foral de Nafarroako Foru Komunitatea (eu)	Chartered Community of Navarre	autonomous community
ES-PV	País Vasco; Euskal Herria (eu)	Basque Country	autonomous community
ES-VC	Valenciana, Comunidad; Valenciana, Comunitat (ca)	Valencian Community	autonomous community

=== Provinces ===
Code	Subdivision name (es)	In autonomous community
ES-C	A Coruña (gl) [La Coruña]	GA
ES-VI	Álava; Araba (eu)	PV
ES-AB	Albacete	CM
ES-A	Alicante; Alacant (ca)	VC
ES-AL	Almería	AN
ES-O	Asturias	AS
ES-AV	Ávila	CL
ES-BA	Badajoz	EX
ES-B	Barcelona (ca) [Barcelona]	CT
ES-BI	Bizkaia (eu)	PV
ES-BU	Burgos	CL
ES-CC	Cáceres	EX
ES-CA	Cádiz	AN
ES-S	Cantabria	CB
ES-CS	Castellón; Castelló (ca)	VC
ES-CR	Ciudad Real	CM
ES-CO	Córdoba	AN
ES-CU	Cuenca	CM
ES-SS	Gipuzkoa (eu)	PV
ES-GI	Girona (ca) [Gerona]	CT
ES-GR	Granada	AN
ES-GU	Guadalajara	CM
ES-H	Huelva	AN
ES-HU	Huesca	AR
ES-PM	Illes Balears (ca) [Islas Baleares]	IB
ES-J	Jaén	AN
ES-LO	La Rioja	RI
ES-GC	Las Palmas	CN
ES-LE	León	CL
ES-L	Lleida (ca) [Lérida]	CT
ES-LU	Lugo (gl) [Lugo]	GA
ES-M	Madrid	MD
ES-MA	Málaga	AN
ES-MU	Murcia	MC
ES-NA	Navarra; Nafarroa (eu)	NC
ES-OR	Ourense (gl) [Orense]	GA
ES-P	Palencia	CL
ES-PO	Pontevedra (gl) [Pontevedra]	GA
ES-SA	Salamanca	CL
ES-TF	Santa Cruz de Tenerife	CN
ES-SG	Segovia	CL
ES-SE	Sevilla	AN
ES-SO	Soria	CL
ES-T	Tarragona (ca) [Tarragona]	CT
ES-TE	Teruel	AR
ES-TO	Toledo	CM
ES-V	Valencia; València (ca)	VC
ES-VA	Valladolid	CL
ES-ZA	Zamora	CL
ES-Z	Zaragoza	AR

== Changes ==
The following changes to the entry have been announced in newsletters by the ISO 3166/MA since the first publication of ISO 3166-2 in 1998:

Newsletter	Date issued	Description of change in newsletter	Code/Subdivision change
Newsletter I-1	2000-06-21	Code elements for autonomous communities withdrawn to correct the erroneous duplicate coding of the whole Spanish territory (see 4.1.1 of ISO 3166-2). Introduction of a third column stating a regional level of subdivision which is not coded (see 4.4. c) of ISO 3166-2). Introduction of 2 alternative name forms. Correction of 1 spelling error	
Newsletter I-2	2002-05-21	Spelling correction and update in header information. Four corrections in spellings of subdivisions	Codes: Illes Balears: ES-PM → ES-IB (to correct duplicate use); ES-GE Gerona → ES-GI Girona
Newsletter I-4	2002-12-10	Error correction: Regional subdivision indicator corrected in ES-PM	
Newsletter II-1	2010-02-03 (corrected 2010-02-19)	Addition of the country code prefix as the first code element, reallocation of 3166-2 alpha-2 codes to avoid duplication, update of the administrative structure, addition of names in administrative languages	Codes: (to correct duplicate use); Asturias, Principado de: ES-O → ES-AS; Cantabria (autonomous community): ES-S → ES-CB; La Rioja: (autonomous community): ES-LO → ES-RI; Madrid, Comunidad de: ES-M → ES-MD; Murcia, Región de: ES-MU → ES-MC; Navarra, Comunidad Foral de: ES-NA → ES-NC
Online Browsing Platform (OBP)	2020-11-24	Change of subdivision name of ES-PM; Update List Source; Correction of the Code Source	

== Special territories ==
The following two areas not covered by European Union Customs arrangements are also exceptionally reserved ISO 3166-1 alpha-2 codes on the request of the World Customs Organization:

- EA Ceuta, Melilla
- IC Canary Islands

However, these codes do not correspond in any way to the ISO 3166-2 codes of the territories.

== See also ==
- Subdivisions of Spain
- FIPS region codes of Spain
- NUTS codes of Spain
- Neighbouring countries: AD, FR, GI, MA, PT
