= NUTS statistical regions of Georgia =

The Nomenclature of Territorial Units for Statistics (NUTS) is a geographical standard used by Georgia in order to divide its territory into regions at three different levels of specified classes of its population. Georgia is a recognised potential candidate country for membership of the European Union (EU) and thus part of the classification. The three hierarchical levels are known as NUTS-1, NUTS-2 and NUTS-3, moving from larger to smaller territorial divisions. According to the Annex 1 of the Harmonization Plan.

== Overall ==
Level	Division	#
NUTS 1	Georgia	
NUTS 2	West Georgia, East Georgia and Tbilisi	3
NUTS 3	The Autonomous Republic of Adjara, Imereti Region and Racha-Lechkhumi and Kvemo Svaneti are combined in one single region, Guria, Samegrelo-Zemo Svaneti, Shida Kartli, Mtskheta Mtianeti, Kakheti, Kvemo Kartli, Smtskhe Javakheti and Tbilisi	10

== Regions ==
The NUTS codes are as follows:

NUTS-1	Code	NUTS-2	Code	NUTS-3	Code
Georgia	GE1				
Georgia	GE1	West Georgia	GE11	Adjara	GE111
Georgia	GE1	West Georgia	GE11	Guria	GE112
Georgia	GE1	West Georgia	GE11	Samegrelo-Zemo Svaneti	GE113
Georgia	GE1	West Georgia	GE11	Imereti & Racha-Lechkhumi and Kvemo Svaneti	GE114
Georgia	GE1	East Georgia	GE12	Shida Kartli	GE121
Georgia	GE1	East Georgia	GE12	Mtskheta Mtianeti	GE122
Georgia	GE1	East Georgia	GE12	Kakheti	GE123
Georgia	GE1	East Georgia	GE12	Kvemo Kartli	GE124
Georgia	GE1	East Georgia	GE12	Samtskhe Javakheti	GE125
Georgia	GE1	Tbilisi	GE13	Tbilisi	GE131
