= ISO 3166-2:CY =

Entry for Cyprus in ISO 3166-2

ISO 3166-2:CY is the entry for Cyprus in ISO 3166-2, part of the ISO 3166 standard published by the International Organization for Standardization (ISO), which defines codes for the names of the principal subdivisions (e.g., provinces or states) of all countries coded in ISO 3166-1.

Currently for Cyprus, ISO 3166-2 codes are defined for six districts (el: επαρχίες, eparchies; tr: kaza).

Each code consists of two parts, separated by a hyphen. The first part is CY, the ISO 3166-1 alpha-2 code of Cyprus. The second part is two digits (01–06).

== Current codes ==
Subdivision names are listed as in the ISO 3166-2 standard published by the ISO 3166 Maintenance Agency (ISO 3166/MA).

ISO 639-1 codes are used to represent subdivision names in the following administrative languages:

- (el): Greek
- (tr): Turkish

Code	Subdivision name (el) (ELOT 743:1982 = ISO 843:1997 = UN V/19 1987)	Subdivision name (el)	Subdivision name (tr)	Subdivision name (en)
CY-04	Ammochostos	Αμμόχωστος	Mağusa	Famagusta
CY-06	Keryneia	Κερύvεια	Girne	Kyrenia
CY-03	Larnaka	Λάρνακα	Larnaka	Larnaca
CY-01	Lefkosia	Λευκωσία	Lefkoşa	Nicosia
CY-02	Lemesos	Λεμεσός	Leymasun	Limassol
CY-05	Pafos	Πάφος	Baf	Paphos

The full name of Cyprus in ISO 3166 is the Republic of Cyprus. Yet Cyprus is de facto divided into the Republic of Cyprus, and the Turkish Republic of Northern Cyprus with limited recognition. Thus not all of the territory of the districts is controlled by the government of the Republic of Cyprus; see Northern Cyprus.

The British Overseas Territory of Akrotiri and Dhekelia (which consists of military bases) does not have an ISO 3166 code.

== Changes ==
The following changes to the entry are listed on ISO's online catalogue, the Online Browsing Platform:

Effective date of change	Short description of change (en)
2014-11-03	Update List Source
2015-11-27	Update List Source
2017-11-23	Update List Source; change of spelling of CY-02, CY-04 (tur)
2018-04-20	Update Code Source; update List Source
2018-11-26	Correction of the romanization system label

== See also ==
- Subdivisions of Cyprus
- FIPS region codes of Cyprus
- NUTS codes of Cyprus
- Neighbouring country: GB (Akrotiri and Dhekelia)
