= Districts of Cyprus =

Districts of Cyprus Επαρχίες της Κύπρου (Greek) Kıbrıs'ın kazaları (Turkish)
- Category: Unitary state
- Location: Republic of Cyprus
- Number: 6 Districts
- Populations: Famagusta 54,282 - Nicosia 350,824
- Areas: Kyrenia (643.9 km^{2}) - Nicosia (2,710 km^{2})
- Government: District government, National government
- Subdivisions: Municipalities of Cyprus

Cyprus is divided into six districts (Greek: επαρχίες; Turkish: kazalar), whose capitals share the same name. The districts are subdivided into municipalities and communities. The districts of Cyprus are listed in the table below.

District	Population (2021 census)	Area (km^{2})
Nicosia (Λευκωσία; Lefkoşa)	350,824	2,710.0
Limassol (Λεμεσός; Limasol or Leymosun)	262,238	1,393.3
Larnaca (Λάρνακα; Larnaka)	155,753	1,120.1
Paphos (Πάφος; Baf or Gazibaf)	100,175	1,389.8
Famagusta (Αμμόχωστος; Gazimağusa)	54,282	1,985.3
Kyrenia (Κερύvεια; Girne)	N/A	643.9

Note: Northern Cyprus-controlled lands are included in the area figures, but population was not enumerated there. The UN Buffer Zone is included in both population and area figures. Akrotiri and Dhekelia are not included in the area figures, but non-military Cypriot citizens residing there were enumerated.

== See also ==
- List of cities, towns and villages in Cyprus
- Telephone numbers in Cyprus
- Postal codes in Cyprus
- ISO 3166-2:CY
- Districts of Northern Cyprus
