= NUTS statistical regions of Finland =

Statistical regions of Finland

Nomenclature of Territorial Units for Statistics (NUTS) is a geocode standard for referencing country subdivisions for statistical purposes. The NUTS standard is instrumental in delivering the European Union's Structural Funds. Each EU member state is hierarchically divided into three NUTS levels. The classification is reviewed at most every three years. The current classification is NUTS 2024, which became legally effective on January 1, 2024.

The NUTS code for Finland is FI. The three levels are:

Level	Subdivisions	#
NUTS 1	Mainland Finland, Åland (Finnish: Manner-Suomi, Ahvenanmaa; Swedish: Fasta Finland, Åland)	2
NUTS 2	Large areas (Suuralueet / Storområden)	5
NUTS 3	Regions (Maakunnat / Landskap)	19

Below these three NUTS levels are the Local Administrative Unit (LAU) levels. In Finland, there are two LAU levels, which consist of the sub-regions, and the municipalities.

== NUTS codes ==
NUTS 1	Code	NUTS 2	Code	NUTS 3	Code 2024	Code 2013.	Code 2003
Mainland Finland	FI1	West Finland	FI19	Central Finland	FI198	FI193	
	FI1	West Finland	FI19	Southern Ostrobothnia	FI199	FI194	
	FI1	West Finland	FI19	Ostrobothnia	FI19A	FI195	
	FI1	West Finland	FI19	Satakunta	FI196		FI191
	FI1	West Finland	FI19	Pirkanmaa	FI19B	FI197	FI192
	FI1	Helsinki-Uusimaa	FI1B	Helsinki-Uusimaa	FI1B1		
	FI1	South Finland	FI1C	Southwest Finland	FI1C1		
	FI1	South Finland	FI1C	Kanta-Häme	FI1C2		
	FI1	South Finland	FI1C	Päijät-Häme	FI1C6	FI1C3	
	FI1	South Finland	FI1C	Kymenlaakso	FI1C7	FI1C4	
	FI1	South Finland	FI1C	South Karelia	FI1C5		
	FI1	North & East Finland	FI1D	Etelä-Savo	FI1DA	FI1D1	
	FI1	North & East Finland	FI1D	Pohjois-Savo	FI1DB	FI1D2	
	FI1	North & East Finland	FI1D	North Karelia	FI1DC	FI1D3	
	FI1	North & East Finland	FI1D	Kainuu	FI1D8	FI1D4	
	FI1	North & East Finland	FI1D	Central Ostrobothnia	FI1D5		
	FI1	North & East Finland	FI1D	Northern Ostrobothnia	FI1D9	FI1D6	
	FI1	North & East Finland	FI1D	Lapland	FI1D7		
Åland	FI2	Åland	FI20	Åland	FI200		

== Local administrative units ==
Below the NUTS levels, the two LAU (Local Administrative Units) levels are:

Level	Subdivisions	#
LAU 1	Sub-regions (Seutukunnat / Ekonomiska regioner)	77
LAU 2	Municipalities (Kunnat / Kommuner)	416

The LAU codes of Finland can be downloaded here:

== See also ==
- List of Finnish regions by Human Development Index
- Subdivisions of Finland
- ISO 3166-2 codes of Finland
- FIPS region codes of Finland

== Sources ==
- Hierarchical list of the Nomenclature of territorial units for statistics - NUTS and the Statistical regions of Europe
- Overview map of EU Countries - NUTS level 1
  - SUOMI / FINLAND - NUTS level 2
  - SUOMI / FINLAND - NUTS level 3
- Correspondence between the NUTS levels and the national administrative units
- List of current NUTS codes
  - Download current NUTS codes (ODS format)
- Provinces of Finland, Statoids.com
