= NUTS statistical regions of Cyprus =

Geocode standard used in Cyprus

The Nomenclature of Territorial Units for Statistics (NUTS) is a geocode standard used for referencing the subdivisions of Cyprus for statistical purposes. The standard is developed and regulated by the European Union. The NUTS standard is instrumental in delivering the European Union's Structural Funds. The NUTS code assigned to Cyprus is CY, and Eurostat has established a hierarchical structure consisting of three levels. However, Cyprus does not have subdivisions covered by the NUTS levels, as its population is small enough to be covered within a single level.

In addition to the NUTS levels, there are further levels of geographic organisation known as the local administrative units (LAU). In Cyprus, LAU 1 corresponds to districts, and LAU 2 represents municipalities. These divisions help in the administration and organization of statistical data at a local level.

== Overall and NUTS codes ==
Level	Subdivisions	#	NUTS codes
NUTS 1	—	1	CY0 Cyprus
NUTS 2	—	1	CY00 Cyprus
NUTS 3	—	1	CY000 Cyprus

== Local administrative units ==
Below the NUTS levels, the two LAU (Local Administrative Units) levels are:

Level	Subdivisions	#
LAU 1	Districts (Eparchies)	6
LAU 2	Municipalities, communities (Dimoi, koinotites)	615

The LAU codes of Cyprus can be downloaded here:

== See also ==
- Subdivisions of Cyprus
- ISO 3166-2 codes of Cyprus
- FIPS region codes of Cyprus

== Sources ==
- Hierarchical list of the Nomenclature of territorial units for statistics - NUTS and the Statistical regions of Europe
- Overview map of EU Countries - NUTS level 1
  - KYPROS / KIBRIS - NUTS level 2
  - KYPROS / KIBRIS - NUTS level 3
- Correspondence between the NUTS levels and the national administrative units
- List of current NUTS codes
  - Download current NUTS codes (ODS format)
