= NUTS statistical regions of Denmark =

Geocode standard used in Denmark

The Nomenclature of Territorial Units for Statistics (NUTS) is a geocode standard for referencing the administrative division of Denmark for statistical purposes. The standard is developed and regulated by the European Union. The NUTS standard is instrumental in delivering the European Union's Structural Funds. The NUTS code for Denmark is DK and a hierarchy of three levels is established by Eurostat. Below these is a further levels of geographic organisation - the local administrative unit (LAU). In Denmark, the LAU 1 are municipalities and the LAU 2 are parishes.

== Overall ==
=== NUTS codes ===
Level	Subdivisions	#
NUTS 1	—	1
NUTS 2	Regions (Danish: Regioner)	5
NUTS 3	Provinces (Danish: Landsdele)	11

=== Local administrative units ===
Below the NUTS levels, the LAU (Local Administrative Units) levels are:

Level	Subdivisions	#
LAU1	Municipalities (Danish: Kommuner)	99
LAU2	Parishes (Danish: Sogne)	2133

The LAU codes of Denmark can be downloaded here:

== NUTS codes ==
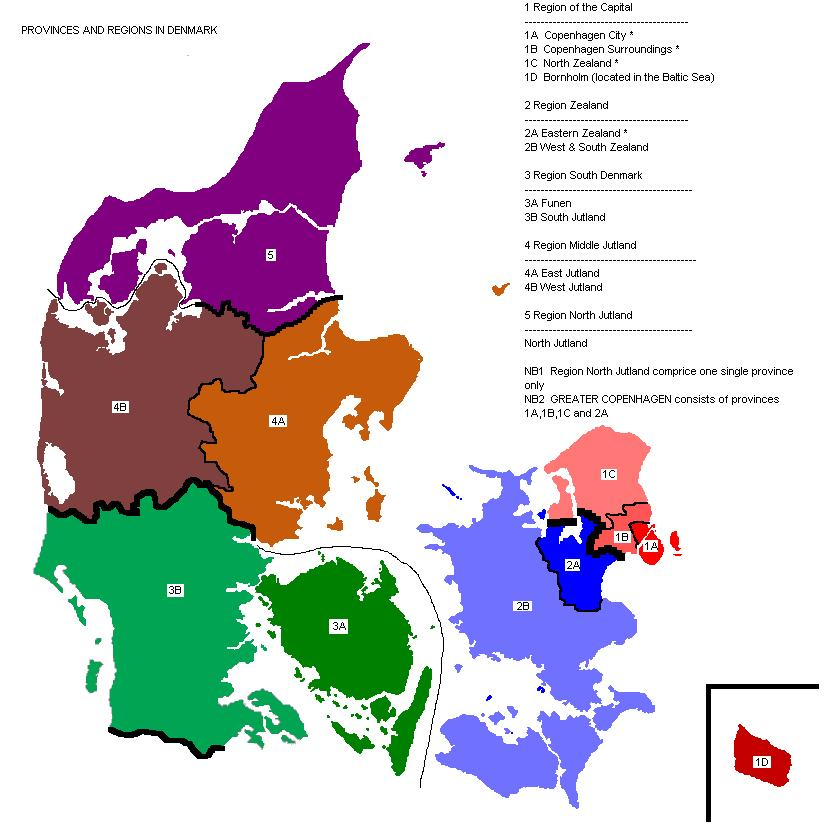
Map of Denmark showing NUTS 3 regions.

NUTS 1	Code	NUTS 2	Code	NUTS 3	Code
Denmark	DK0	Hovedstaden	DK01	Byen København	DK011
Denmark	DK0	Hovedstaden	DK01	Københavns omegn	DK012
Denmark	DK0	Hovedstaden	DK01	Nordsjælland	DK013
Denmark	DK0	Hovedstaden	DK01	Bornholm	DK014
Denmark	DK0	Sjælland	DK02	Østsjælland	DK021
Denmark	DK0	Sjælland	DK02	Vest- og Sydsjælland	DK022
Denmark	DK0	Southern Denmark	DK03	Fyn	DK031
Denmark	DK0	Southern Denmark	DK03	Sydjylland	DK032
Denmark	DK0	Midtjylland	DK04	Vestjylland	DK041
Denmark	DK0	Midtjylland	DK04	Østjylland	DK042
Denmark	DK0	Nordjylland	DK05	Nordjylland	DK050

=== Before 2003 ===
In the 2003 version, before the counties were abolished, the codes were as follows:

NUTS 1	Code	NUTS 2	Code	NUTS 3	Code
Denmark	DK0	Denmark	DK00	Copenhagen and Frederiksberg	DK001
Denmark	DK0	Denmark	DK00	Copenhagen County	DK002
Denmark	DK0	Denmark	DK00	Frederiksborg County	DK003
Denmark	DK0	Denmark	DK00	Roskilde County	DK004
Denmark	DK0	Denmark	DK00	West Zealand County	DK005
Denmark	DK0	Denmark	DK00	Storstrøm County	DK006
Denmark	DK0	Denmark	DK00	Bornholm	DK007
Denmark	DK0	Denmark	DK00	Funen County	DK008
Denmark	DK0	Denmark	DK00	South Jutland County	DK009
Denmark	DK0	Denmark	DK00	Ribe County	DK00A
Denmark	DK0	Denmark	DK00	Vejle County	DK00B
Denmark	DK0	Denmark	DK00	Ringkjøbing County	DK00C
Denmark	DK0	Denmark	DK00	Århus County	DK00D
Denmark	DK0	Denmark	DK00	Viborg County	DK00E
Denmark	DK0	Denmark	DK00	North Jutland County	DK00F

== See also ==
- Administrative divisions of Denmark
- FIPS region codes of Denmark
- ISO 3166-2 codes of Denmark

== Sources ==
- Hierarchical list of the Nomenclature of territorial units for statistics - NUTS and the Statistical regions of Europe
- Overview map of EU Countries - NUTS level 1
  - Overview map of EU Countries - Country level
  - Overview map of EU Countries - NUTS level 1
- Correspondence between the NUTS levels and the national administrative units
- List of current NUTS codes
  - Download current NUTS codes (ODS format)
- Regions of Denmark, Statoids.com
