= NUTS statistical regions of Belgium =

The Nomenclature of Territorial Units for Statistics (NUTS) is a geocode standard for referencing the subdivisions of Belgium for statistical purposes. The standard is developed and regulated by the European Union. The NUTS standard is instrumental in delivering the European Union's Structural Funds. The NUTS code for Belgium is BE and a hierarchy of three levels is established by Eurostat. Below these is a further levels of geographic organisation - the local administrative unit (LAU). In Belgium, the LAUs are municipalities.

== Overall ==
=== NUTS Levels ===
Level	Subdivisions	#
NUTS 1	Regions (Gewesten/Régions)	3
NUTS 2	Provinces (Provincies/Provinces) (+ Brussels)	11
NUTS 3	Arrondissements (Arrondissementen/Arrondissements) (Verviers split into two)	44

=== Local administrative units ===
Below the NUTS levels, the two LAU (Local Administrative Units) levels are:

Level	Subdivisions	#
LAU 1	— (same as NUTS 3)	44
LAU 2	Municipalities (Gemeenten/Communes)	589

The LAU codes of Belgium can be downloaded here:

== NUTS codes ==
NUTS 1	Code	NUTS 2	Code	NUTS 3	Code
Brussels	BE1	Brussels	BE10	Arrondissement of Brussels-Capital	BE100
Flanders	BE2	Antwerp	BE21	Arrondissement of Antwerp	BE211
Flanders	BE2	Antwerp	BE21	Arrondissement of Mechelen	BE212
Flanders	BE2	Antwerp	BE21	Arrondissement of Turnhout	BE213
Flanders	BE2	Limburg	BE22	Arrondissement of Tongeren	BE223
Flanders	BE2	Limburg	BE22	Arrondissement of Hasselt	BE224
Flanders	BE2	Limburg	BE22	Arrondissement of Maaseik	BE225
Flanders	BE2	East Flanders	BE23	Arrondissement of Aalst	BE231
Flanders	BE2	East Flanders	BE23	Arrondissement of Dendermonde	BE232
Flanders	BE2	East Flanders	BE23	Arrondissement of Eeklo	BE233
Flanders	BE2	East Flanders	BE23	Arrondissement of Ghent	BE234
Flanders	BE2	East Flanders	BE23	Arrondissement of Oudenaarde	BE235
Flanders	BE2	East Flanders	BE23	Arrondissement of Sint-Niklaas	BE236
Flanders	BE2	Flemish Brabant	BE24	Arrondissement of Halle-Vilvoorde	BE241
Flanders	BE2	Flemish Brabant	BE24	Arrondissement of Leuven	BE242
Flanders	BE2	West Flanders	BE25	Arrondissement of Bruges	BE251
Flanders	BE2	West Flanders	BE25	Arrondissement of Diksmuide	BE252
Flanders	BE2	West Flanders	BE25	Arrondissement of Ypres	BE253
Flanders	BE2	West Flanders	BE25	Arrondissement of Kortrijk	BE254
Flanders	BE2	West Flanders	BE25	Arrondissement of Ostend	BE255
Flanders	BE2	West Flanders	BE25	Arrondissement of Roeselare	BE256
Flanders	BE2	West Flanders	BE25	Arrondissement of Tielt	BE257
Flanders	BE2	West Flanders	BE25	Arrondissement of Veurne	BE258
Wallonia	BE3	Walloon Brabant	BE31	Arrondissement of Nivelles	BE310
Wallonia	BE3	Hainaut	BE32	Arrondissement of Mons	BE323
Wallonia	BE3	Hainaut	BE32	Arrondissement of Tournai-Mouscron	BE328
Wallonia	BE3	Hainaut	BE32	Arrondissement of La Louvière	BE329
Wallonia	BE3	Hainaut	BE32	Arrondissement of Ath	BE32A
Wallonia	BE3	Hainaut	BE32	Arrondissement of Charleroi	BE32B
Wallonia	BE3	Hainaut	BE32	Arrondissement of Soignies	BE32C
Wallonia	BE3	Hainaut	BE32	Arrondissement of Thuin	BE32D
Wallonia	BE3	Liège	BE33	Arrondissement of Huy	BE331
Wallonia	BE3	Liège	BE33	Arrondissement of Liège	BE332
Wallonia	BE3	Liège	BE33	Arrondissement of Waremme	BE334
Wallonia	BE3	Liège	BE33	Arrondissement of Verviers, municipalities of the French Community	BE335
Wallonia	BE3	Liège	BE33	Arrondissement of Verviers, municipalities of the German Community	BE336
Wallonia	BE3	Luxembourg (Belgium)	BE34	Arrondissement of Arlon	BE341
Wallonia	BE3	Luxembourg (Belgium)	BE34	Arrondissement of Bastogne	BE342
Wallonia	BE3	Luxembourg (Belgium)	BE34	Arrondissement of Marche-en-Famenne	BE343
Wallonia	BE3	Luxembourg (Belgium)	BE34	Arrondissement of Neufchâteau	BE344
Wallonia	BE3	Luxembourg (Belgium)	BE34	Arrondissement of Virton	BE345
Wallonia	BE3	Namur	BE35	Arrondissement of Dinant	BE351
Wallonia	BE3	Namur	BE35	Arrondissement of Namur	BE352
Wallonia	BE3	Namur	BE35	Arrondissement of Philippeville	BE353

In the 2003 version, the Arrondissement of Verviers was coded BE333.

== See also ==
- Subdivisions of Belgium
- ISO 3166-2 codes of Belgium
- FIPS region codes of Belgium

== Sources ==
- Hierarchical list of the Nomenclature of territorial units for statistics - NUTS and the Statistical regions of Europe
- Overview map of EU Countries - NUTS level 1
  - BELGIQUE / BELGIË - NUTS level 2
  - BELGIQUE / BELGIË - NUTS level 3
- Correspondence between the NUTS levels and the national administrative units
- List of current NUTS codes
  - Download current NUTS codes (ODS format)
- Provinces of Belgium, Statoids.com
- Arrondissements of Belgium, Statoids.com
