= NUTS statistical regions of Luxembourg =

Statistical regions of Luxembourg

In the NUTS (Nomenclature of Territorial Units for Statistics) codes of Luxembourg (LU), the three levels are:

Level	Subdivisions	#
NUTS 1	—	1
NUTS 2	—	1
NUTS 3	—	1

== NUTS codes ==
LU0 Luxembourg

LU00 Luxembourg

LU000 Luxembourg

== Local administrative units ==
=== Until 2017 ===
Below the NUTS levels, the two LAU (Local Administrative Unit) levels are:

Level	Subdivisions	#
LAU 1	Cantons	12
LAU 2	Communes	102

The LAU codes of Luxembourg can be found in this spread sheet of all 28 EU member states LAU codes here, current as of 2018:

=== Since 2017 ===
Level	Subdivisions	#
LAU	Communes	102

== See also ==
- Subdivisions of Luxembourg
- ISO 3166-2 codes of Luxembourg
- FIPS region codes of Luxembourg

== Sources ==
- Hierarchical list of the Nomenclature of territorial units for statistics - NUTS and the Statistical regions of Europe
- Overview map of EU Countries - NUTS level 1
  - LUXEMBOURG - NUTS level 2
  - LUXEMBOURG - NUTS level 3
- Correspondence between the NUTS levels and the national administrative units
- List of current NUTS codes
  - Download current NUTS codes (ODS format)
