= NUTS statistical regions of Latvia =

Statistical regions of Latvia

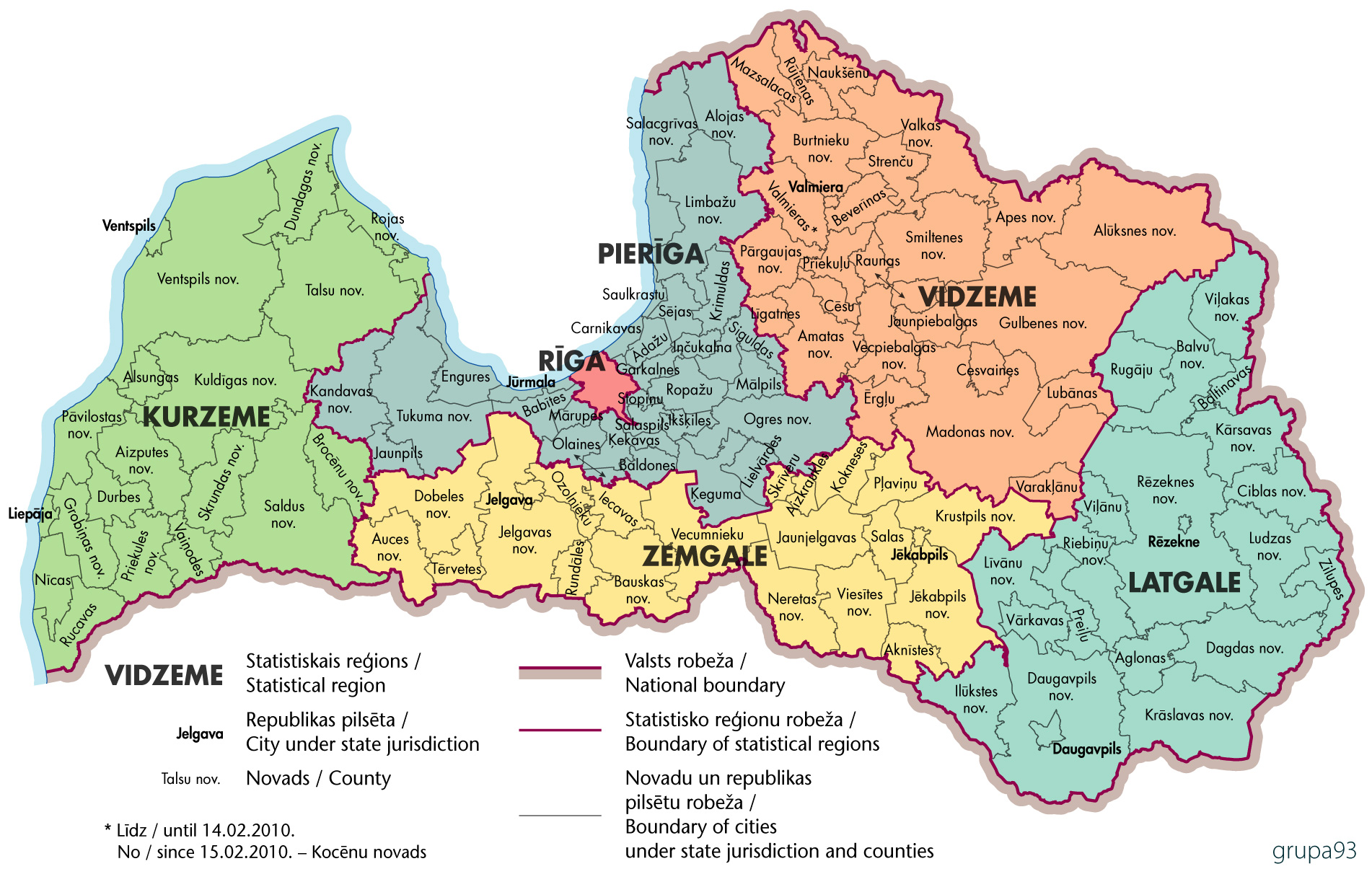
Statistical regions of Latvia

The three NUTS (Nomenclature of Territorial Units for Statistics) levels for Latvia (LV) are:

| Level | Subdivisions | # |
|---|---|---|
| NUTS 1 | — (the whole country) | 1 |
| NUTS 2 | — (the whole country) | 1 |
| NUTS 3 | Statistical regions (Statistiskie reģioni) | 6 |

== NUTS codes ==
LV0 Latvia

LV00 Latvia

LV003 Kurzeme
LV005 Latgale
LV006 Rīga
LV007 Pierīga
LV008 Vidzeme
LV009 Zemgale

== Local administrative units ==
NUTS 3 level is subdivided into LAU 1 units. LAU 1 units are subdivided into LAU 2 units.

LAU (Local Administrative Units) in Latvia according to NUTS regulation (up to 31.12.2011):

| Level | Subdivisions | # |
|---|---|---|
| LAU 1 | Administrative districts, cities under state jurisdiction (Administratīvie rajoni, republikas pilsētas) | 33 |
| LAU 2 | Towns, cities under state jurisdiction, municipalities, parishes (Pilsētas, republikas pilsētas, novadi, pagasti) | 522 |

History of changes of LAU 2 codes till 1 July 2009 can be viewed here.

LAU in Latvia according to NUTS regulation (starting 01.01.2012):

| Level | Subdivisions | # |
|---|---|---|
| LAU 1 | — | —* |
| LAU 2 | Cities under state jurisdiction, municipalities (Republikas pilsētas, novadi) | 119 |

* Due to Administrative Territorial Reform (1 July 2009) administrative districts no longer exist as administrative units in Latvia. Municipalities and parishes amalgamated and formed new LAU 2 units – municipalities. LAU 2 codes from 1 July 2009 updated version.

Changes of LAU 2 codes on 1 July 2009 can be viewed here

== See also ==
- Subdivisions of Latvia
- ISO 3166-2 codes of Latvia
- FIPS region codes of Latvia

== Sources ==
- Hierarchical list of the Nomenclature of territorial units for statistics - NUTS and the Statistical regions of Europe
- Correspondence between the NUTS levels and the local administrative units of each EU country
- List of current NUTS codes
  - Download current NUTS codes (ODS format)
- Municipalities of Latvia, Statoids.com
