= NUTS statistical regions of France =

In the NUTS (Nomenclature of Territorial Units for Statistics) codes of France (FR), the three levels are:

Level	Subdivisions	#
NUTS 1	Regions + DOM (collectively)	14
NUTS 2	Former regions (1982 - 2015) + DOM (individually)	27
NUTS 3	Departments + DOM (individually)	101

== NUTS codes ==
NUTS 1	Code	NUTS 2	Code	NUTS 3	Code
Île de France	FR1	Île de France	FR10	Paris	FR101
Île de France	FR1	Île de France	FR10	Seine-et-Marne	FR102
Île de France	FR1	Île de France	FR10	Yvelines	FR103
Île de France	FR1	Île de France	FR10	Essonne	FR104
Île de France	FR1	Île de France	FR10	Hauts-de-Seine	FR105
Île de France	FR1	Île de France	FR10	Seine-Saint-Denis	FR106
Île de France	FR1	Île de France	FR10	Val-de-Marne	FR107
Île de France	FR1	Île de France	FR10	Val-d'Oise	FR108
Centre-Val de Loire	FRB	Centre-Val de Loire	FRB0	Cher	FRB01
Centre-Val de Loire	FRB	Centre-Val de Loire	FRB0	Eure-et-Loir	FRB02
Centre-Val de Loire	FRB	Centre-Val de Loire	FRB0	Indre	FRB03
Centre-Val de Loire	FRB	Centre-Val de Loire	FRB0	Indre-et-Loire	FRB04
Centre-Val de Loire	FRB	Centre-Val de Loire	FRB0	Loir-et-Cher	FRB05
Centre-Val de Loire	FRB	Centre-Val de Loire	FRB0	Loiret	FRB06
Bourgogne-Franche-Comté	FRC	Bourgogne	FRC1	Côte-d’Or	FRC11
Bourgogne-Franche-Comté	FRC	Bourgogne	FRC1	Nièvre	FRC12
Bourgogne-Franche-Comté	FRC	Bourgogne	FRC1	Saône-et-Loire	FRC13
Bourgogne-Franche-Comté	FRC	Bourgogne	FRC1	Yonne	FRC14
Bourgogne-Franche-Comté	FRC	Franche-Comté	FRC2	Doubs	FRC21
Bourgogne-Franche-Comté	FRC	Franche-Comté	FRC2	Jura	FRC22
Bourgogne-Franche-Comté	FRC	Franche-Comté	FRC2	Haute-Saône	FRC23
Bourgogne-Franche-Comté	FRC	Franche-Comté	FRC2	Territoire de Belfort	FRC24
Normandy	FRD	Lower Normandy	FRD1	Calvados	FRD11
Normandy	FRD	Lower Normandy	FRD1	Manche	FRD12
Normandy	FRD	Lower Normandy	FRD1	Orne	FRD13
Normandy	FRD	Upper Normandy	FRD2	Eure	FRD21
Normandy	FRD	Upper Normandy	FRD2	Seine-Maritime	FRD22
Hauts-de-France	FRE	Nord-Pas-de-Calais	FRE1	Nord	FRE11
Hauts-de-France	FRE	Nord-Pas-de-Calais	FRE1	Pas-de-Calais	FRE12
Hauts-de-France	FRE	Picardy	FRE2	Aisne	FRE21
Hauts-de-France	FRE	Picardy	FRE2	Oise	FRE22
Hauts-de-France	FRE	Picardy	FRE2	Somme	FRE23
Grand Est	FRF	Alsace	FRF1	Bas-Rhin	FRF11
Grand Est	FRF	Alsace	FRF1	Haut-Rhin	FRF12
Grand Est	FRF	Champagne-Ardenne	FRF2	Ardennes	FRF21
Grand Est	FRF	Champagne-Ardenne	FRF2	Aube	FRF22
Grand Est	FRF	Champagne-Ardenne	FRF2	Marne	FRF23
Grand Est	FRF	Champagne-Ardenne	FRF2	Haute-Marne	FRF24
Grand Est	FRF	Lorraine	FRF3	Meurthe-et-Moselle	FRF31
Grand Est	FRF	Lorraine	FRF3	Meuse	FRF32
Grand Est	FRF	Lorraine	FRF3	Moselle	FRF33
Grand Est	FRF	Lorraine	FRF3	Vosges	FRF34
Pays de la Loire	FRG	Pays de la Loire	FRG0	Loire-Atlantique	FRG01
Pays de la Loire	FRG	Pays de la Loire	FRG0	Maine-et-Loire	FRG02
Pays de la Loire	FRG	Pays de la Loire	FRG0	Mayenne	FRG03
Pays de la Loire	FRG	Pays de la Loire	FRG0	Sarthe	FRG04
Pays de la Loire	FRG	Pays de la Loire	FRG0	Vendée	FRG05
Brittany	FRH	Brittany	FRH0	Côtes-d'Armor	FRH01
Brittany	FRH	Brittany	FRH0	Finistère	FRH02
Brittany	FRH	Brittany	FRH0	Ille-et-Vilaine	FRH03
Brittany	FRH	Brittany	FRH0	Morbihan	FRH04
Nouvelle-Aquitaine	FRI	Aquitaine	FRI1	Dordogne	FRI11
Nouvelle-Aquitaine	FRI	Aquitaine	FRI1	Gironde	FRI12
Nouvelle-Aquitaine	FRI	Aquitaine	FRI1	Landes	FRI13
Nouvelle-Aquitaine	FRI	Aquitaine	FRI1	Lot-et-Garonne	FRI14
Nouvelle-Aquitaine	FRI	Aquitaine	FRI1	Pyrénées-Atlantiques	FRI15
Nouvelle-Aquitaine	FRI	Limousin	FRI2	Corrèze	FRI21
Nouvelle-Aquitaine	FRI	Limousin	FRI2	Creuse	FRI22
Nouvelle-Aquitaine	FRI	Limousin	FRI2	Haute-Vienne	FRI23
Nouvelle-Aquitaine	FRI	Poitou-Charentes	FRI3	Charente	FRI31
Nouvelle-Aquitaine	FRI	Poitou-Charentes	FRI3	Charente-Maritime	FRI32
Nouvelle-Aquitaine	FRI	Poitou-Charentes	FRI3	Deux-Sèvres	FRI33
Nouvelle-Aquitaine	FRI	Poitou-Charentes	FRI3	Vienne	FRI34
Occitania	FRJ	Languedoc-Roussillon	FRJ1	Aude	FRJ11
Occitania	FRJ	Languedoc-Roussillon	FRJ1	Gard	FRJ12
Occitania	FRJ	Languedoc-Roussillon	FRJ1	Hérault	FRJ13
Occitania	FRJ	Languedoc-Roussillon	FRJ1	Lozère	FRJ14
Occitania	FRJ	Languedoc-Roussillon	FRJ1	Pyrénées-Orientales	FRJ15
Occitania	FRJ	Midi-Pyrénées	FRJ2	Ariège	FRJ21
Occitania	FRJ	Midi-Pyrénées	FRJ2	Aveyron	FRJ22
Occitania	FRJ	Midi-Pyrénées	FRJ2	Haute-Garonne	FRJ23
Occitania	FRJ	Midi-Pyrénées	FRJ2	Gers	FRJ24
Occitania	FRJ	Midi-Pyrénées	FRJ2	Lot	FRJ25
Occitania	FRJ	Midi-Pyrénées	FRJ2	Hautes-Pyrénées	FRJ26
Occitania	FRJ	Midi-Pyrénées	FRJ2	Tarn	FRJ27
Occitania	FRJ	Midi-Pyrénées	FRJ2	Tarn-et-Garonne	FRJ28
Auvergne-Rhône-Alpes	FRK	Auvergne	FRK1	Allier	FRK11
Auvergne-Rhône-Alpes	FRK	Auvergne	FRK1	Cantal	FRK12
Auvergne-Rhône-Alpes	FRK	Auvergne	FRK1	Haute-Loire	FRK13
Auvergne-Rhône-Alpes	FRK	Auvergne	FRK1	Puy-de-Dôme	FRK14
Auvergne-Rhône-Alpes	FRK	Rhône-Alpes	FRK2	Ain	FRK21
Auvergne-Rhône-Alpes	FRK	Rhône-Alpes	FRK2	Ardèche	FRK22
Auvergne-Rhône-Alpes	FRK	Rhône-Alpes	FRK2	Drôme	FRK23
Auvergne-Rhône-Alpes	FRK	Rhône-Alpes	FRK2	Isère	FRK24
Auvergne-Rhône-Alpes	FRK	Rhône-Alpes	FRK2	Loire	FRK25
Auvergne-Rhône-Alpes	FRK	Rhône-Alpes	FRK2	Rhône	FRK26
Auvergne-Rhône-Alpes	FRK	Rhône-Alpes	FRK2	Savoie	FRK27
Auvergne-Rhône-Alpes	FRK	Rhône-Alpes	FRK2	Haute-Savoie	FRK28
Provence-Alpes-Côte d’Azur	FRL	Provence-Alpes-Côte d’Azur	FRL0	Alpes-de-Haute-Provence	FRL01
Provence-Alpes-Côte d’Azur	FRL	Provence-Alpes-Côte d’Azur	FRL0	Hautes-Alpes	FRL02
Provence-Alpes-Côte d’Azur	FRL	Provence-Alpes-Côte d’Azur	FRL0	Alpes-Maritimes	FRL03
Provence-Alpes-Côte d’Azur	FRL	Provence-Alpes-Côte d’Azur	FRL0	Bouches-du-Rhône	FRL04
Provence-Alpes-Côte d’Azur	FRL	Provence-Alpes-Côte d’Azur	FRL0	Var	FRL05
Provence-Alpes-Côte d’Azur	FRL	Provence-Alpes-Côte d’Azur	FRL0	Vaucluse	FRL06
Corsica	FRM	Corsica	FRM0	Corse-du-Sud	FRM01
Corsica	FRM	Corsica	FRM0	Haute-Corse	FRM02
Départements d'Outre Mer	FRY	Guadeloupe (including the Collectivity of Saint Martin)	FRY1	Guadeloupe (including the Collectivity of Saint Martin)	FRY10
Départements d'Outre Mer	FRY	Martinique	FRY2	Martinique	FRY20
Départements d'Outre Mer	FRY	French Guiana	FRY3	French Guiana	FRY30
Départements d'Outre Mer	FRY	La Réunion	FRY4	La Réunion	FRY40
Départements d'Outre Mer	FRY	Mayotte	FRY5	Mayotte	FRY50

== Local administrative units ==
Below the NUTS levels, the LAU (Local Administrative Units) are:

Level	Subdivisions	#
LAU	Communes	36683

The LAU codes of France can be downloaded here:

== History ==
Up until 2016, the first level NUTS regions of France consisted of Ile de France, Bassin Parisien, Nord-Pas-de-Calais, Est, Ouest, Sud-Ouest, Centre-Est, Méditerranée and the Départements d'outre-mer. The Départements d'outre-mer consisted of all the overseas departments of France, while the remaining eight statistical regions were made up of the 22 regions of France.

Code	Name	Corresponding second-level NUTS	Map
FR	France		
FR1	Région parisienne	Île-de-France	
FR2	Bassin parisien	Champagne-Ardenne, Picardy, Upper Normandy, Centre, Lower Normandy, Burgundy	
FR3	Nord	Nord-Pas-de-Calais	
FR4	Est	Lorraine, Alsace, Franche-Comté	
FR5	Ouest	Pays de la Loire, Brittany, Poitou-Charentes	
FR6	Sud-Ouest	Aquitaine, Midi-Pyrénées, Limousin	
FR7	Centre-Est	Rhône-Alpes, Auvergne	
FR8	Méditerranée	Languedoc-Roussillon, Provence-Alpes-Côte d'Azur, Corsica	
FRA	Départements d'Outre-Mer	Guadeloupe and the Collectivity of Saint Martin, Martinique, French Guiana, La Réunion, Mayotte	

A law passed in 2014 by the French parliament reduced the number of metropolitan regions in the country from 22 to 13. The decrease took effect from 1 January 2016. As a result, the first level NUTS statistical regions were altered to reflect the changes. The number of first level regions was increased to 14 so that each of the 13 metropolitan regions of France became a separate first level statistical region.

== Départements d'outre-mer ==
Although the Départements d'outre-mer, as integrated departments of France, have always been a part of the European Union and its predecessors, they were only officially included as a permanent NUTS statistical area of France in 1989. When they did appear in previous statistics the first and second level NUTS areas were one and the same; from 1989, Guadeloupe, Martinique, French Guiana and La Réunion were designated as separate level 2 regions.

== See also ==
- Subdivisions of France
- ISO 3166-2 codes of France
- FIPS region codes of France

== Notes ==
1. Includes the Collectivity of Saint Martin which, despite its secession from the overseas department and region of Guadeloupe, is still part of the NUTS 2 and NUTS 3 region of Guadeloupe.

== Sources ==
- FRANC - NUTS level 1 to 3 (Commission Regulation (EU) 2016/2066, 21 November 2016), Official Journal of the European Union, pdf, page 26
- List of current NUTS codes (2016) with previously used codes, simap.ted.europa.eu
- History of NUTS, ec.europa.eu/eurostat
- Overview map of EU Countries - NUTS level 1 (2010)
- Correspondence between the NUTS levels and the national administrative units (2016), ec.europa.eu/eurostat
