= Mainland Finland =

Finland excluding the Åland Islands

Coordinates: 65°N 27°E

Mainland Finland (Finnish: Manner-Suomi, Swedish: Fasta Finland) is a term used in statistics and in other contexts to describe the continental parts of Finland, an area which excludes Åland. In legal contexts, the relation between the mainland and Åland is depicted by the word pair the State–Åland (Finnish: valtakunta–maakunta, Swedish: riket–landskapet).

The term "mainland Finland" is significant in the context of legal differences between Åland and mainland Finland, and in the context of differences of culture, language, history, and self-perceived nationhood between the Ålanders and the Swedish-speaking Finns in mainland Finland. However, since the population of Åland is only about 0.5% of that of mainland Finland, and below 10% of that of the Swedish-speaking Finns in mainland Finland, there are many instances when this distinction is ignored.

In a geographical sense the term "mainland Finland" can be used to exclude Finland's other sea islands, but when distinguishing between Åland and the rest of Finland, the term encompasses those islands.

== See also ==
- NUTS statistical regions of Finland
