= NUTS statistical regions of Spain =

Statistical regions of Spain

In the NUTS (Nomenclature of Territorial Units for Statistics) codes of Spain (ES), the following are the first-level political and administrative divisions.

== Overall ==
=== NUTS Codes ===
| Level | Subdivisions | # |
|---|---|---|
| NUTS 1 | Groups of autonomous communities (Agrupación de comunidades autónomas) | 7 |
| NUTS 2 | Autonomous communities and cities (Comunidades y ciudades autónomas) | 19 |
| NUTS 3 | Provinces + Islands + Ceuta and Melilla (Provincias + islas + Ceuta y Melilla) | 59 |

=== Local administrative units ===
Below the NUTS levels, the two LAU (Local Administrative Units) levels are:

| Level | Subdivisions | # |
|---|---|---|
| LAU 1 | — (same as NUTS 3) | 59 |
| LAU 2 | Municipalities (Municipios) | 8114 |

The LAU codes of Spain can be downloaded here:

== NUTS codes ==
| NUTS 1 | Code | NUTS 2 | Code | NUTS 3 | Code |
|---|---|---|---|---|---|
| NOROESTE | ES1 | Galicia | ES11 | A Coruña | ES111 |
| NOROESTE | ES1 | Galicia | ES11 | Lugo | ES112 |
| NOROESTE | ES1 | Galicia | ES11 | Ourense | ES113 |
| NOROESTE | ES1 | Galicia | ES11 | Pontevedra | ES114 |
| NOROESTE | ES1 | Principality of Asturias | ES12 | Asturias | ES120 |
| NOROESTE | ES1 | Cantabria | ES13 | Cantabria | ES130 |
| NORESTE | ES2 | Basque Community | ES21 | Álava/Araba | ES211 |
| NORESTE | ES2 | Basque Community | ES21 | Guipúzcoa/Gipuzkoa | ES212 |
| NORESTE | ES2 | Basque Community | ES21 | Vizcaya/Bizkaia | ES213 |
| NORESTE | ES2 | Navarre | ES22 | Navarre | ES220 |
| NORESTE | ES2 | La Rioja | ES23 | La Rioja | ES230 |
| NORESTE | ES2 | Aragon | ES24 | Huesca | ES241 |
| NORESTE | ES2 | Aragon | ES24 | Teruel | ES242 |
| NORESTE | ES2 | Aragon | ES24 | Zaragoza | ES243 |
| COM. DE MADRID | ES3 | Madrid | ES30 | Madrid | ES300 |
| CENTRO | ES4 | Castile-Leon | ES41 | Ávila | ES411 |
| CENTRO | ES4 | Castile-Leon | ES41 | Burgos | ES412 |
| CENTRO | ES4 | Castile-Leon | ES41 | León | ES413 |
| CENTRO | ES4 | Castile-Leon | ES41 | Palencia | ES414 |
| CENTRO | ES4 | Castile-Leon | ES41 | Salamanca | ES415 |
| CENTRO | ES4 | Castile-Leon | ES41 | Segovia | ES416 |
| CENTRO | ES4 | Castile-Leon | ES41 | Soria | ES417 |
| CENTRO | ES4 | Castile-Leon | ES41 | Valladolid | ES418 |
| CENTRO | ES4 | Castile-Leon | ES41 | Zamora | ES419 |
| CENTRO | ES4 | Castile-La Mancha | ES42 | Albacete | ES421 |
| CENTRO | ES4 | Castile-La Mancha | ES42 | Ciudad Real | ES422 |
| CENTRO | ES4 | Castile-La Mancha | ES42 | Cuenca | ES423 |
| CENTRO | ES4 | Castile-La Mancha | ES42 | Guadalajara | ES424 |
| CENTRO | ES4 | Castile-La Mancha | ES42 | Toledo | ES425 |
| CENTRO | ES4 | Extremadura | ES43 | Badajoz | ES431 |
| CENTRO | ES4 | Extremadura | ES43 | Cáceres | ES432 |
| ESTE | ES5 | Catalonia | ES51 | Barcelona | ES511 |
| ESTE | ES5 | Catalonia | ES51 | Girona | ES512 |
| ESTE | ES5 | Catalonia | ES51 | Lleida | ES513 |
| ESTE | ES5 | Catalonia | ES51 | Tarragona | ES514 |
| ESTE | ES5 | Valencian Community | ES52 | Alicante | ES521 |
| ESTE | ES5 | Valencian Community | ES52 | Castellón/Castelló | ES522 |
| ESTE | ES5 | Valencian Community | ES52 | Valencia | ES523 |
| ESTE | ES5 | Balearic Islands | ES53 | Eivissa i Formentera | ES531 |
| ESTE | ES5 | Balearic Islands | ES53 | Mallorca | ES532 |
| ESTE | ES5 | Balearic Islands | ES53 | Menorca | ES533 |
| SUR | ES6 | Andalusia | ES61 | Almería | ES611 |
| SUR | ES6 | Andalusia | ES61 | Cádiz | ES612 |
| SUR | ES6 | Andalusia | ES61 | Córdoba | ES613 |
| SUR | ES6 | Andalusia | ES61 | Granada | ES614 |
| SUR | ES6 | Andalusia | ES61 | Huelva | ES615 |
| SUR | ES6 | Andalusia | ES61 | Jaén | ES616 |
| SUR | ES6 | Andalusia | ES61 | Málaga | ES617 |
| SUR | ES6 | Andalusia | ES61 | Sevilla | ES618 |
| SUR | ES6 | Region of Murcia | ES62 | Murcia | ES620 |
| SUR | ES6 | Ceuta | ES63 | Ceuta | ES630 |
| SUR | ES6 | Melilla | ES64 | Melilla | ES640 |
| CANARIAS | ES7 | Canary Islands | ES70 | El Hierro | ES703 |
| CANARIAS | ES7 | Canary Islands | ES70 | Fuerteventura | ES704 |
| CANARIAS | ES7 | Canary Islands | ES70 | Gran Canaria | ES705 |
| CANARIAS | ES7 | Canary Islands | ES70 | La Gomera | ES706 |
| CANARIAS | ES7 | Canary Islands | ES70 | La Palma | ES707 |
| CANARIAS | ES7 | Canary Islands | ES70 | Lanzarote | ES708 |
| CANARIAS | ES7 | Canary Islands | ES70 | Tenerife | ES709 |

=== Older Codes ===
In the 2003 version, the two provinces of the Canary Islands were coded as follows:

| Las Palmas | ES701 |
| Tenerife | ES702 |

== See also ==
- Subdivisions of Spain
- ISO 3166-2 codes of Spain
- FIPS region codes of Spain

== Sources ==
- Hierarchical list of the Nomenclature of territorial units for statistics - NUTS and the Statistical regions of Europe
- Overview map of EU Countries - NUTS level 1
  - ESPANA - NUTS level 2
  - ESPANA - NUTS level 3
- Correspondence between the NUTS levels and the national administrative units
- List of current NUTS codes
  - Download current NUTS codes (ODS format)
- Provinces of Spain, Statoids.com
