= NUTS statistical regions of Poland =

Statistical regions of Poland

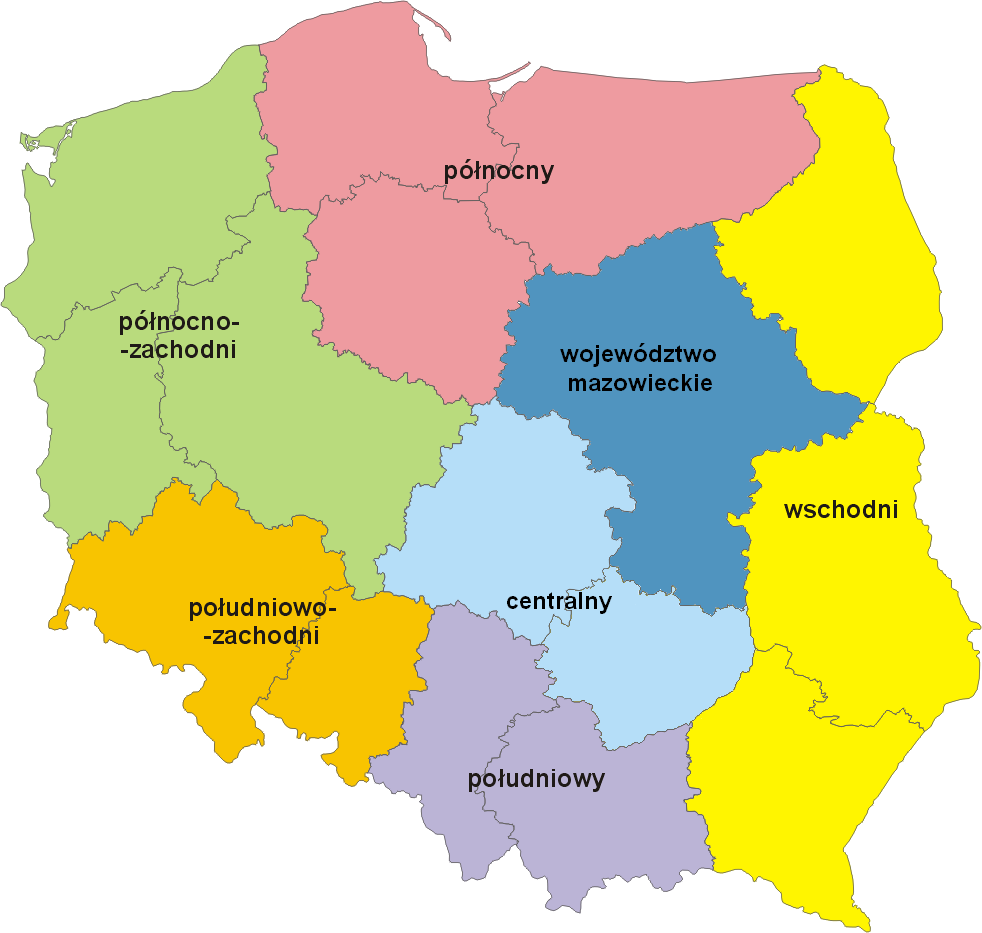
NUTS 1 divisions in Poland, since 2018

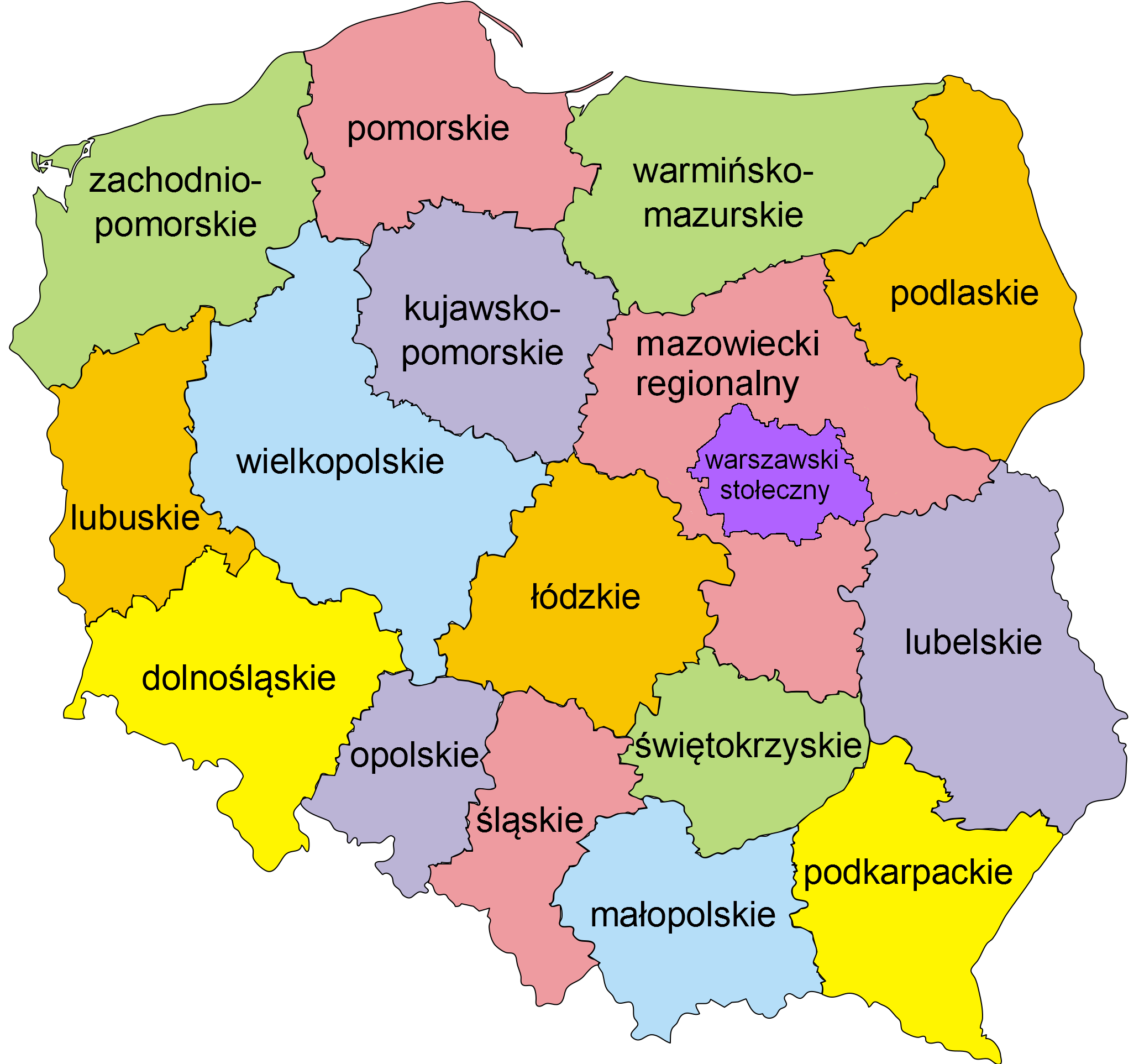
NUTS 2 divisions in Poland, since 2018

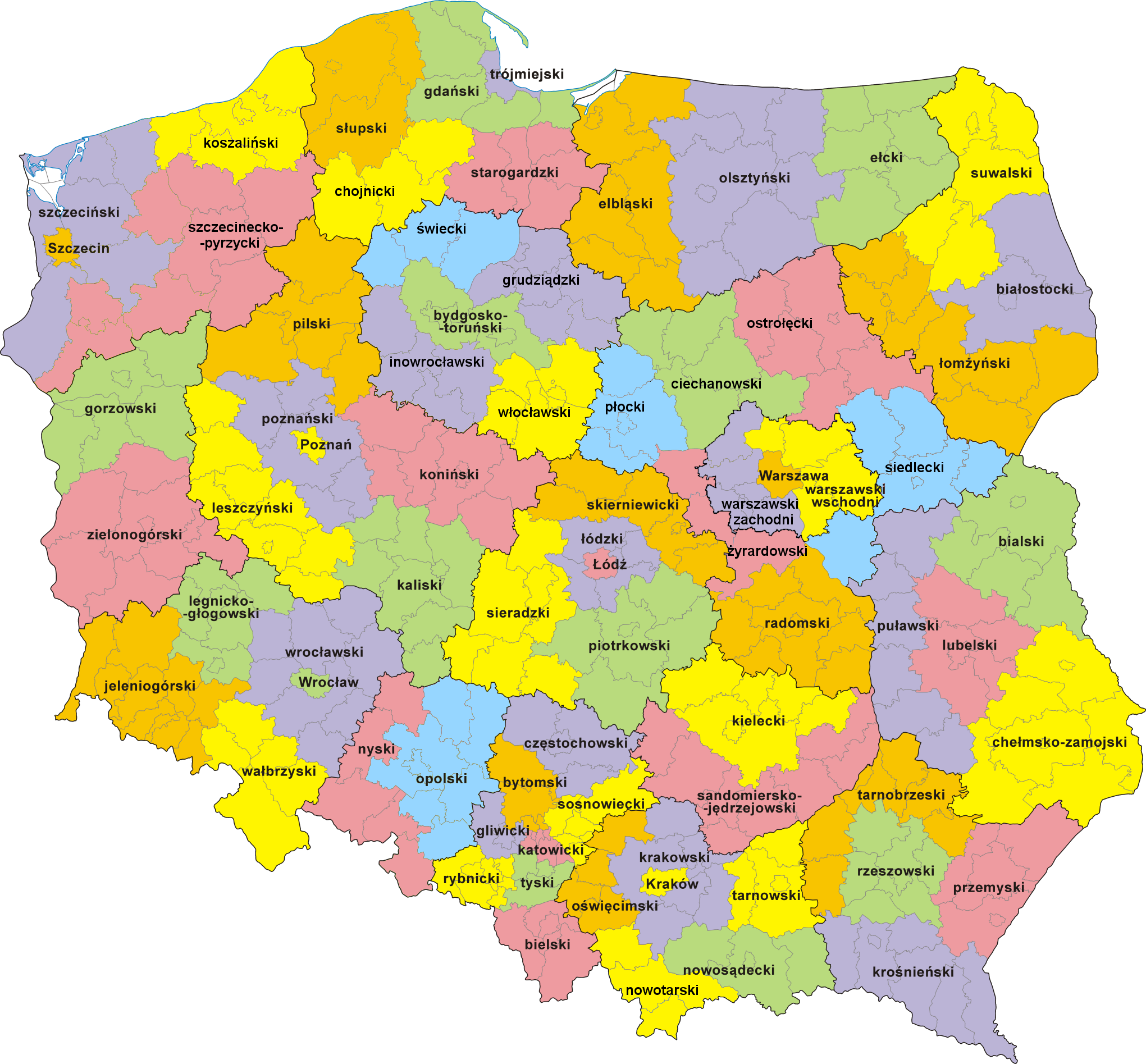
NUTS 3 divisions in Poland, since 2018

In the NUTS (Nomenclature of Territorial Units for Statistics) codes of Poland (PL), the three levels are:

Level	Subdivisions	#
NUTS 1	Macroregions (makroregiony)	7
NUTS 2	Regions (regiony); coterminous with voivodeships, with one exception (Mazovian Voivodeship, which is split into 2 NUTS units)	17
NUTS 3	Subregions (podregiony)	73

== NUTS codes ==
The regional coding below was last verified on October 20, 2019. The current coding as well as the history can be found under https://ec.europa.eu/eurostat/web/nuts/history

=== Current NUTS codes ===
In the 2018 version, the codes are as follows:

NUTS 1	Code	NUTS 2	Code	NUTS 3	Code
MAKROREGION CENTRALNY	PL7	Łódzkie	PL71	Miasto Łódź	PL711
MAKROREGION CENTRALNY	PL7	Łódzkie	PL71	Łódzki	PL712
MAKROREGION CENTRALNY	PL7	Łódzkie	PL71	Piotrkowski	PL713
MAKROREGION CENTRALNY	PL7	Łódzkie	PL71	Sieradzki	PL714
MAKROREGION CENTRALNY	PL7	Łódzkie	PL71	Skierniewicki	PL715
MAKROREGION CENTRALNY	PL7	Świętokrzyskie	PL72	Kielecki	PL721
MAKROREGION CENTRALNY	PL7	Świętokrzyskie	PL72	Sandomiersko-jędrzejowski	PL722
MAKROREGION POŁUDNIOWY	PL2	Małopolskie	PL21	Miasto Kraków	PL213
MAKROREGION POŁUDNIOWY	PL2	Małopolskie	PL21	Krakowski	PL214
MAKROREGION POŁUDNIOWY	PL2	Małopolskie	PL21	Tarnowski	PL217
MAKROREGION POŁUDNIOWY	PL2	Małopolskie	PL21	Nowosądecki	PL218
MAKROREGION POŁUDNIOWY	PL2	Małopolskie	PL21	Nowotarski	PL219
MAKROREGION POŁUDNIOWY	PL2	Małopolskie	PL21	Oświęcimski	PL21A
MAKROREGION POŁUDNIOWY	PL2	Śląskie	PL22	Częstochowski	PL224
MAKROREGION POŁUDNIOWY	PL2	Śląskie	PL22	Bielski	PL225
MAKROREGION POŁUDNIOWY	PL2	Śląskie	PL22	Rybnicki	PL227
MAKROREGION POŁUDNIOWY	PL2	Śląskie	PL22	Bytomski	PL228
MAKROREGION POŁUDNIOWY	PL2	Śląskie	PL22	Gliwicki	PL229
MAKROREGION POŁUDNIOWY	PL2	Śląskie	PL22	Katowicki	PL22A
MAKROREGION POŁUDNIOWY	PL2	Śląskie	PL22	Sosnowiecki	PL22B
MAKROREGION POŁUDNIOWY	PL2	Śląskie	PL22	Tyski	PL22C
MAKROREGION WSCHODNI	PL8	Lubelskie	PL81	Bialski	PL811
MAKROREGION WSCHODNI	PL8	Lubelskie	PL81	Chełmsko-zamojski	PL812
MAKROREGION WSCHODNI	PL8	Lubelskie	PL81	Lubelski	PL814
MAKROREGION WSCHODNI	PL8	Lubelskie	PL81	Puławski	PL815
MAKROREGION WSCHODNI	PL8	Podkarpackie	PL82	Krośnieński	PL821
MAKROREGION WSCHODNI	PL8	Podkarpackie	PL82	Przemyski	PL822
MAKROREGION WSCHODNI	PL8	Podkarpackie	PL82	Rzeszowski	PL823
MAKROREGION WSCHODNI	PL8	Podkarpackie	PL82	Tarnobrzeski	PL824
MAKROREGION WSCHODNI	PL8	Podlaskie	PL84	Białostocki	PL841
MAKROREGION WSCHODNI	PL8	Podlaskie	PL84	Łomżyński	PL842
MAKROREGION WSCHODNI	PL8	Podlaskie	PL84	Suwalski	PL843
MAKROREGION PÓŁNOCNO-ZACHODNI	PL4	Wielkopolskie	PL41	Pilski	PL411
MAKROREGION PÓŁNOCNO-ZACHODNI	PL4	Wielkopolskie	PL41	Koniński	PL414
MAKROREGION PÓŁNOCNO-ZACHODNI	PL4	Wielkopolskie	PL41	Miasto Poznań	PL415
MAKROREGION PÓŁNOCNO-ZACHODNI	PL4	Wielkopolskie	PL41	Kaliski	PL416
MAKROREGION PÓŁNOCNO-ZACHODNI	PL4	Wielkopolskie	PL41	Leszczyński	PL417
MAKROREGION PÓŁNOCNO-ZACHODNI	PL4	Wielkopolskie	PL41	Poznański	PL418
MAKROREGION PÓŁNOCNO-ZACHODNI	PL4	Zachodniopomorskie	PL42	Miasto Szczecin	PL424
MAKROREGION PÓŁNOCNO-ZACHODNI	PL4	Zachodniopomorskie	PL42	Koszaliński	PL426
MAKROREGION PÓŁNOCNO-ZACHODNI	PL4	Zachodniopomorskie	PL42	Szczecinecko-pyrzycki	PL427
MAKROREGION PÓŁNOCNO-ZACHODNI	PL4	Zachodniopomorskie	PL42	Szczeciński	PL428
MAKROREGION PÓŁNOCNO-ZACHODNI	PL4	Lubuskie	PL43	Gorzowski	PL431
MAKROREGION PÓŁNOCNO-ZACHODNI	PL4	Lubuskie	PL43	Zielonogórski	PL432
MAKROREGION POŁUDNIOWO-ZACHODNI	PL5	Dolnośląskie	PL51	Miasto Wrocław	PL514
MAKROREGION POŁUDNIOWO-ZACHODNI	PL5	Dolnośląskie	PL51	Jeleniogórski	PL515
MAKROREGION POŁUDNIOWO-ZACHODNI	PL5	Dolnośląskie	PL51	Legnicko-głogowski	PL516
MAKROREGION POŁUDNIOWO-ZACHODNI	PL5	Dolnośląskie	PL51	Wałbrzyski	PL517
MAKROREGION POŁUDNIOWO-ZACHODNI	PL5	Dolnośląskie	PL51	Wrocławski	PL518
MAKROREGION POŁUDNIOWO-ZACHODNI	PL5	Opolskie	PL52	Nyski	PL523
MAKROREGION POŁUDNIOWO-ZACHODNI	PL5	Opolskie	PL52	Opolski	PL524
MAKROREGION PÓŁNOCNY	PL6	Kujawsko-Pomorskie	PL61	Bydgosko-toruński	PL613
MAKROREGION PÓŁNOCNY	PL6	Kujawsko-Pomorskie	PL61	Grudziądzki	PL616
MAKROREGION PÓŁNOCNY	PL6	Kujawsko-Pomorskie	PL61	Inowrocławski	PL617
MAKROREGION PÓŁNOCNY	PL6	Kujawsko-Pomorskie	PL61	Świecki	PL618
MAKROREGION PÓŁNOCNY	PL6	Kujawsko-Pomorskie	PL61	Włocławski	PL619
MAKROREGION PÓŁNOCNY	PL6	Warmińsko-Mazurskie	PL62	Elbląski	PL621
MAKROREGION PÓŁNOCNY	PL6	Warmińsko-Mazurskie	PL62	Olsztyński	PL622
MAKROREGION PÓŁNOCNY	PL6	Warmińsko-Mazurskie	PL62	Ełcki	PL623
MAKROREGION PÓŁNOCNY	PL6	Pomorskie	PL63	Trójmiejski	PL633
MAKROREGION PÓŁNOCNY	PL6	Pomorskie	PL63	Gdański	PL634
MAKROREGION PÓŁNOCNY	PL6	Pomorskie	PL63	Słupski	PL636
MAKROREGION PÓŁNOCNY	PL6	Pomorskie	PL63	Chojnicki	PL637
MAKROREGION PÓŁNOCNY	PL6	Pomorskie	PL63	Starogardzki	PL638
MAKROREGION WOJEWÓDZTWO MAZOWIECKIE	PL9	Warszawski stołeczny	PL91	Miasto Warszawa	PL911
MAKROREGION WOJEWÓDZTWO MAZOWIECKIE	PL9	Warszawski stołeczny	PL91	Warszawski wschodni	PL912
MAKROREGION WOJEWÓDZTWO MAZOWIECKIE	PL9	Warszawski stołeczny	PL91	Warszawski zachodni	PL913
MAKROREGION WOJEWÓDZTWO MAZOWIECKIE	PL9	Mazowiecki regionalny	PL92	Radomski	PL921
MAKROREGION WOJEWÓDZTWO MAZOWIECKIE	PL9	Mazowiecki regionalny	PL92	Ciechanowski	PL922
MAKROREGION WOJEWÓDZTWO MAZOWIECKIE	PL9	Mazowiecki regionalny	PL92	Płocki	PL923
MAKROREGION WOJEWÓDZTWO MAZOWIECKIE	PL9	Mazowiecki regionalny	PL92	Ostrołęcki	PL924
MAKROREGION WOJEWÓDZTWO MAZOWIECKIE	PL9	Mazowiecki regionalny	PL92	Siedlecki	PL925
MAKROREGION WOJEWÓDZTWO MAZOWIECKIE	PL9	Mazowiecki regionalny	PL92	Żyrardowski	PL926

=== Former coding ===
==== 2015 NUTS codes ====
In the 2015 version, the codes were as follows:

NUTS 1	Code	NUTS 2	Code	NUTS 3	Code
REGION CENTRALNY	PL1	Łódzkie	PL11	Miasto Łódź	PL113
REGION CENTRALNY	PL1	Łódzkie	PL11	Łódzki	PL114
REGION CENTRALNY	PL1	Łódzkie	PL11	Piotrkowski	PL115
REGION CENTRALNY	PL1	Łódzkie	PL11	Sieradzki	PL116
REGION CENTRALNY	PL1	Łódzkie	PL11	Skierniewicki	PL117
REGION CENTRALNY	PL1	Mazowieckie	PL12	Miasto Warszawa	PL127
REGION CENTRALNY	PL1	Mazowieckie	PL12	Radomski	PL128
REGION CENTRALNY	PL1	Mazowieckie	PL12	Warszawski-wschodni	PL129
REGION CENTRALNY	PL1	Mazowieckie	PL12	Warszawski-zachodni	PL12A
REGION CENTRALNY	PL1	Mazowieckie	PL12	Ciechanowski	PL12B
REGION CENTRALNY	PL1	Mazowieckie	PL12	Płocki	PL12C
REGION CENTRALNY	PL1	Mazowieckie	PL12	Ostrołęcki	PL12D
REGION CENTRALNY	PL1	Mazowieckie	PL12	Siedlecki	PL12E
REGION POŁUDNIOWY	PL2	Małopolskie	PL21	Miasto Kraków	PL213
REGION POŁUDNIOWY	PL2	Małopolskie	PL21	Krakowski	PL214
REGION POŁUDNIOWY	PL2	Małopolskie	PL21	Tarnowski	PL217
REGION POŁUDNIOWY	PL2	Małopolskie	PL21	Nowosądecki	PL218
REGION POŁUDNIOWY	PL2	Małopolskie	PL21	Nowotarski	PL219
REGION POŁUDNIOWY	PL2	Małopolskie	PL21	Oświęcimski	PL21A
REGION POŁUDNIOWY	PL2	Śląskie	PL22	Częstochowski	PL224
REGION POŁUDNIOWY	PL2	Śląskie	PL22	Bielski	PL225
REGION POŁUDNIOWY	PL2	Śląskie	PL22	Rybnicki	PL227
REGION POŁUDNIOWY	PL2	Śląskie	PL22	Bytomski	PL228
REGION POŁUDNIOWY	PL2	Śląskie	PL22	Gliwicki	PL229
REGION POŁUDNIOWY	PL2	Śląskie	PL22	Katowicki	PL22A
REGION POŁUDNIOWY	PL2	Śląskie	PL22	Sosnowiecki	PL22B
REGION POŁUDNIOWY	PL2	Śląskie	PL22	Tyski	PL22C
REGION WSCHODNI	PL3	Lubelskie	PL31	Bialski	PL311
REGION WSCHODNI	PL3	Lubelskie	PL31	Chełmsko-zamojski	PL312
REGION WSCHODNI	PL3	Lubelskie	PL31	Lubelski	PL314
REGION WSCHODNI	PL3	Lubelskie	PL31	Puławski	PL315
REGION WSCHODNI	PL3	Podkarpackie	PL32	Krośnieński	PL323
REGION WSCHODNI	PL3	Podkarpackie	PL32	Przemyski	PL324
REGION WSCHODNI	PL3	Podkarpackie	PL32	Rzeszowski	PL325
REGION WSCHODNI	PL3	Podkarpackie	PL32	Tarnobrzeski	PL326
REGION WSCHODNI	PL3	Świętokrzyskie	PL33	Kielecki	PL331
REGION WSCHODNI	PL3	Świętokrzyskie	PL33	Sandomiersko-jędrzejowski	PL332
REGION WSCHODNI	PL3	Podlaskie	PL34	Białostocki	PL343
REGION WSCHODNI	PL3	Podlaskie	PL34	Łomżyński	PL344
REGION WSCHODNI	PL3	Podlaskie	PL34	Suwalski	PL345
REGION PÓŁNOCNO-ZACHODNI	PL4	Wielkopolskie	PL41	Pilski	PL411
REGION PÓŁNOCNO-ZACHODNI	PL4	Wielkopolskie	PL41	Koniński	PL414
REGION PÓŁNOCNO-ZACHODNI	PL4	Wielkopolskie	PL41	Miasto Poznań	PL415
REGION PÓŁNOCNO-ZACHODNI	PL4	Wielkopolskie	PL41	Kaliski	PL416
REGION PÓŁNOCNO-ZACHODNI	PL4	Wielkopolskie	PL41	Leszczyński	PL417
REGION PÓŁNOCNO-ZACHODNI	PL4	Wielkopolskie	PL41	Poznański	PL418
REGION PÓŁNOCNO-ZACHODNI	PL4	Zachodniopomorskie	PL42	Miasto Szczecin	PL424
REGION PÓŁNOCNO-ZACHODNI	PL4	Zachodniopomorskie	PL42	Koszaliński	PL426
REGION PÓŁNOCNO-ZACHODNI	PL4	Zachodniopomorskie	PL42	Szczecinecko-pyrzycki	PL427
REGION PÓŁNOCNO-ZACHODNI	PL4	Zachodniopomorskie	PL42	Szczeciński	PL428
REGION PÓŁNOCNO-ZACHODNI	PL4	Lubuskie	PL43	Gorzowski	PL431
REGION PÓŁNOCNO-ZACHODNI	PL4	Lubuskie	PL43	Zielonogórski	PL432
REGION POŁUDNIOWO-ZACHODNI	PL5	Dolnośląskie	PL51	Miasto Wrocław	PL514
REGION POŁUDNIOWO-ZACHODNI	PL5	Dolnośląskie	PL51	Jeleniogórski	PL515
REGION POŁUDNIOWO-ZACHODNI	PL5	Dolnośląskie	PL51	Legnicko-głogowski	PL516
REGION POŁUDNIOWO-ZACHODNI	PL5	Dolnośląskie	PL51	Wałbrzyski	PL517
REGION POŁUDNIOWO-ZACHODNI	PL5	Dolnośląskie	PL51	Wrocławski	PL518
REGION POŁUDNIOWO-ZACHODNI	PL5	Opolskie	PL52	Nyski	PL523
REGION POŁUDNIOWO-ZACHODNI	PL5	Opolskie	PL52	Opolski	PL524
REGION PÓŁNOCNY	PL6	Kujawsko-Pomorskie	PL61	Bydgosko-toruński	PL613
REGION PÓŁNOCNY	PL6	Kujawsko-Pomorskie	PL61	Grudziądzki	PL616
REGION PÓŁNOCNY	PL6	Kujawsko-Pomorskie	PL61	Inowrocławski	PL617
REGION PÓŁNOCNY	PL6	Kujawsko-Pomorskie	PL61	Świecki	PL618
REGION PÓŁNOCNY	PL6	Kujawsko-Pomorskie	PL61	Włocławski	PL619
REGION PÓŁNOCNY	PL6	Warmińsko-Mazurskie	PL62	Elbląski	PL621
REGION PÓŁNOCNY	PL6	Warmińsko-Mazurskie	PL62	Olsztyński	PL622
REGION PÓŁNOCNY	PL6	Warmińsko-Mazurskie	PL62	Ełcki	PL623
REGION PÓŁNOCNY	PL6	Pomorskie	PL63	Trójmiejski	PL633
REGION PÓŁNOCNY	PL6	Pomorskie	PL63	Gdański	PL634
REGION PÓŁNOCNY	PL6	Pomorskie	PL63	Słupski	PL636
REGION PÓŁNOCNY	PL6	Pomorskie	PL63	Chojnicki	PL637
REGION PÓŁNOCNY	PL6	Pomorskie	PL63	Starogardzki	PL638

==== 2008 NUTS codes ====
In the 2008 version, the codes were as follows:

PL1 REGION CENTRALNY

PL11 Łódzkie

PL113 Miasto Łódź
PL114 Łódzki
PL115 Piotrkowski
PL116 Sieradzki
PL117 Skierniewicki

PL12 Mazowieckie

PL121 Ciechanowsko-płocki
PL122 Ostrołęcko-siedlecki
PL127 Miasto Warszawa
PL128 Radomski
PL129 Warszawski-wschodni
PL12A Warszawski-zachodni

PL2 REGION POŁUDNIOWY

PL21 Małopolskie

PL213 Miasto Kraków
PL214 Krakowski
PL215 Nowosądecki
PL216 Oświęcimski
PL217 Tarnowski

PL22 Śląskie

PL224 Częstochowski
PL225 Bielski
PL227 Rybnicki
PL228 Bytomski
PL229 Gliwicki
PL22A Katowicki
PL22B Sosnowiecki
PL22C Tyski

PL3 REGION WSCHODNI

PL31 Lubelskie

PL311 Bialski
PL312 Chełmsko-zamojski
PL314 Lubelski
PL315 Puławski

PL32 Podkarpackie

PL323 Krośnieński
PL324 Przemyski
PL325 Rzeszowski
PL326 Tarnobrzeski

PL33 Świętokrzyskie

PL331 Kielecki
PL332 Sandomiersko-jędrzejowski

PL34 Podlaskie

PL343 Białostocki
PL344 Łomżyński
PL345 Suwalski

PL4 REGION PÓŁNOCNO-ZACHODNI

PL41 Wielkopolskie

PL411 Pilski
PL414 Koniński
PL415 Miasto Poznań
PL416 Kaliski
PL417 Leszczyński
PL418 Poznański

PL42 Zachodniopomorskie

PL422 Koszaliński
PL423 Stargardzki
PL424 Miasto Szczecin
PL425 Szczeciński

PL43 Lubuskie

PL431 Gorzowski
PL432 Zielonogórski

PL5 REGION POŁUDNIOWO-ZACHODNI

PL51 Dolnośląskie

PL514 Miasto Wrocław
PL515 Jeleniogórski
PL516 Legnicko-Głogowski
PL517 Wałbrzyski
PL518 Wrocławski

PL52 Opolskie

PL521 Nyski
PL522 Opolski

PL6 REGION PÓŁNOCNY

PL61 Kujawsko-Pomorskie

PL613 Bydgosko-Toruński
PL614 Grudziądzki
PL615 Włocławski

PL62 Warmińsko-Mazurskie

PL621 Elbląski
PL622 Olsztyński
PL623 Ełcki

PL63 Pomorskie

PL631 Słupski
PL633 Trójmiejski
PL634 Gdański
PL635 Starogardzki

==== 2003 NUTS codes ====
In the 2003 version, the codes were as follows:

PL1 CENTRALNY

PL11 Łódzkie

PL111 Łódzki
PL112 Piotrkowsko-skierniewicki
PL113 Miasto Łódź

PL12 Mazowieckie

PL121 Ciechanowsko-plocki
PL122 Ostrolecko-siedlecki
PL124 Radomski
PL126 Warszawski
PL127 Miasto Warszawa

PL2 POLUDNIOWY

PL21 Malopolskie

PL211 Krakowsko-tarnowski
PL212 Nowosadecki
PL213 Miasto Kraków

PL22 Slaskie

PL224 Czestochowski
PL225 Bielsko-bialski
PL226 Centralny slaski
PL227 Rybnicko-jastrzebski

PL3 WSCHODNI

PL31 Lubelskie

PL311 Bialskopodlaski
PL312 Chelmsko-zamojski
PL313 Lubelski

PL32 Podkarpackie

PL321 Rzeszowsko-tarnobrzeski
PL322 Krosniensko-przemyski

PL33 Swietokrzyskie

PL330 Swietokrzyski

PL34 Podlaskie

PL341 Bialostocko-suwalski
PL342 Lomzynski

PL4 POLNOCNO-ZACHODNI

PL41 Wielkopolskie

PL411 Pilski
PL412 Poznanski
PL413 Kaliski
PL414 Koninski
PL415 Miasto Poznan

PL42 Zachodniopomorskie

PL421 Szczecinski
PL422 Koszalinski

PL43 Lubuskie

PL431 Gorzowski
PL432 Zielonogorski

PL5 POLUDNIOWO-ZACHODNI

PL51 Dolnoslaskie

PL511 Jeleniogorsko-walbrzyski
PL512 Legnicki
PL513 Wrocławski
PL514 Miasto Wrocław

PL52 Opolskie

PL520 Opolski

PL6 POLNOCNY

PL61 Kujawsko-Pomorskie

PL611 Bydgoski
PL612 Torunsko-wloclawski

PL62 Warminsko-Mazurskie

PL621 Elblaski
PL622 Olsztynski
PL623 Elcki

PL63 Pomorskie

PL631 Slupski
PL632 Gdanski
PL633 Gdansk-Gdynia-Sopot

== Local administrative units ==
Below the NUTS levels, the two LAU (Local Administrative Units) levels are:

Level	Subdivisions	#
LAU 1	Counties and city counties (Powiaty i miasta na prawach powiatu)	379
LAU 2	Municipalities (Gminy)	2478

The LAU codes of Poland can be downloaded here:

== See also ==
- Subdivisions of Poland
- ISO 3166-2 codes of Poland
- FIPS region codes of Poland

== Sources ==
- Hierarchical list of the Nomenclature of territorial units for statistics - NUTS and the Statistical regions of Europe
- Overview map of EU Countries - NUTS level 1
  - POLSKA - NUTS level 2
  - POLSKA - NUTS level 3
- Correspondence between the NUTS levels and the national administrative units
- List of current NUTS codes
  - Download current NUTS codes (ODS format)
- Voivodships of Poland, Statoids.com
