= Stenkumla =

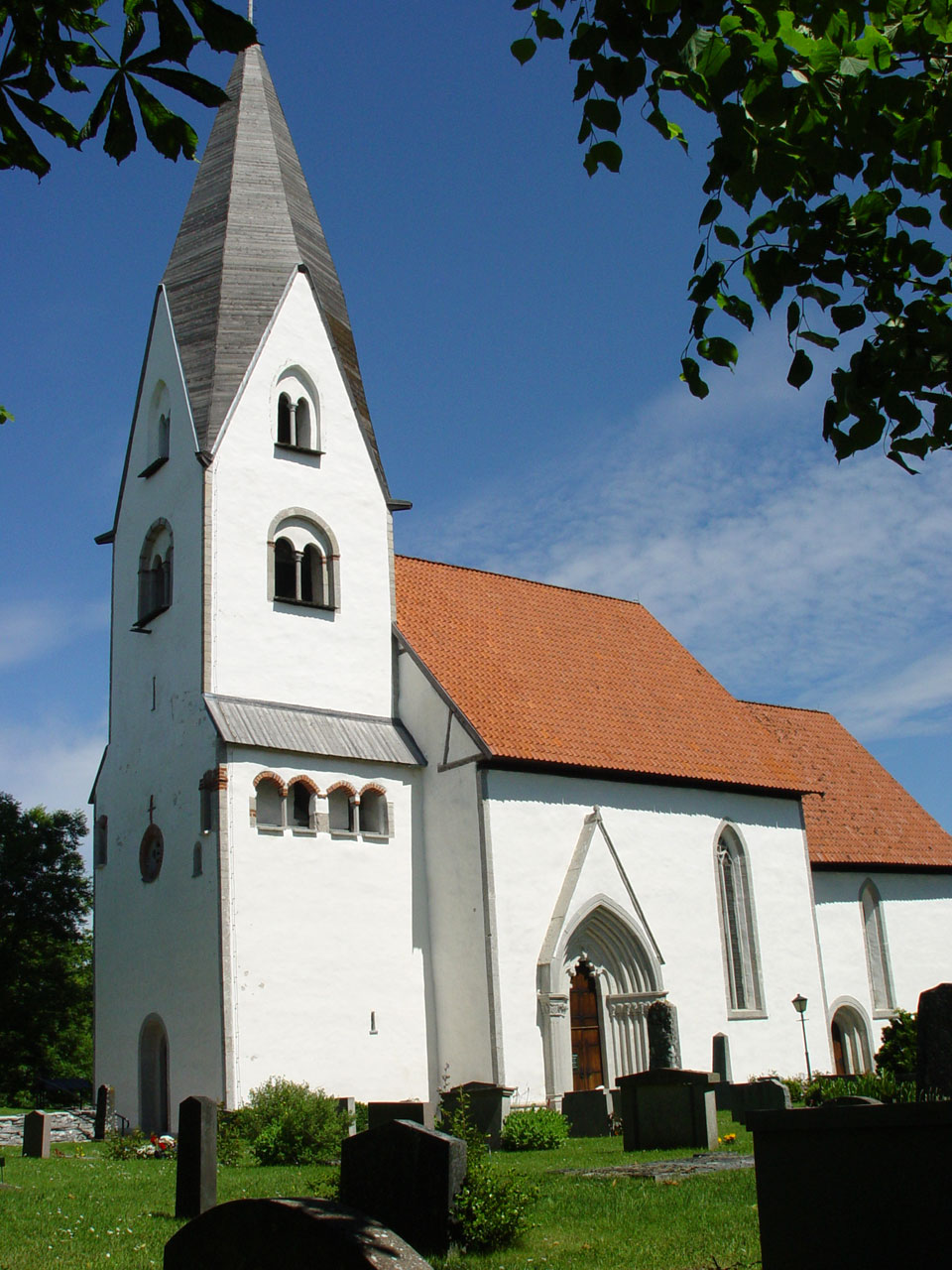
- Stenkumla Church

- Location within Gotland
- Coordinates: 57°32′51″N 18°16′6″E
- Country: Sweden
- Province: Gotland
- County: Gotland County
- Municipality: Gotland Municipality

Area
  - Total: 3,165 km^{2} (1,222 sq mi)

Population (2014)
  - Total: 526
- Time zone: UTC+1 (CET)
  - Summer (DST): UTC+2 (CEST)

Stenkumla is a populated area, a socken (not to be confused with parish), on the Swedish island of Gotland. It comprises the same area as the administrative Stenkumla District, established on 1 January 2016.

== Geography ==
Stenkumla is the name of the socken as well as the district. It is also the name of the small village surrounding the medieval Stenkumla Church, sometimes referred to as Stenkumla kyrkby. It is situated in the central east part of Gotland.

As of 2019, Stenkumla Church belongs to Stenkumla parish, along with the churches in Träkumla, Västerhejde and Vibble.

One of the asteroids in the asteroid belt, 10553 Stenkumla, is named after this place.

== History ==
The last public execution in Sweden took place at Stenkumla Backe by Stenkumla Church on 18 May 1876. Konrad Petterson Lundqvist Tector, a robber and murderer was beheaded. He was buried in the church cemetery where his grave can still be seen.
