= Harald VI =

Retired military mascot

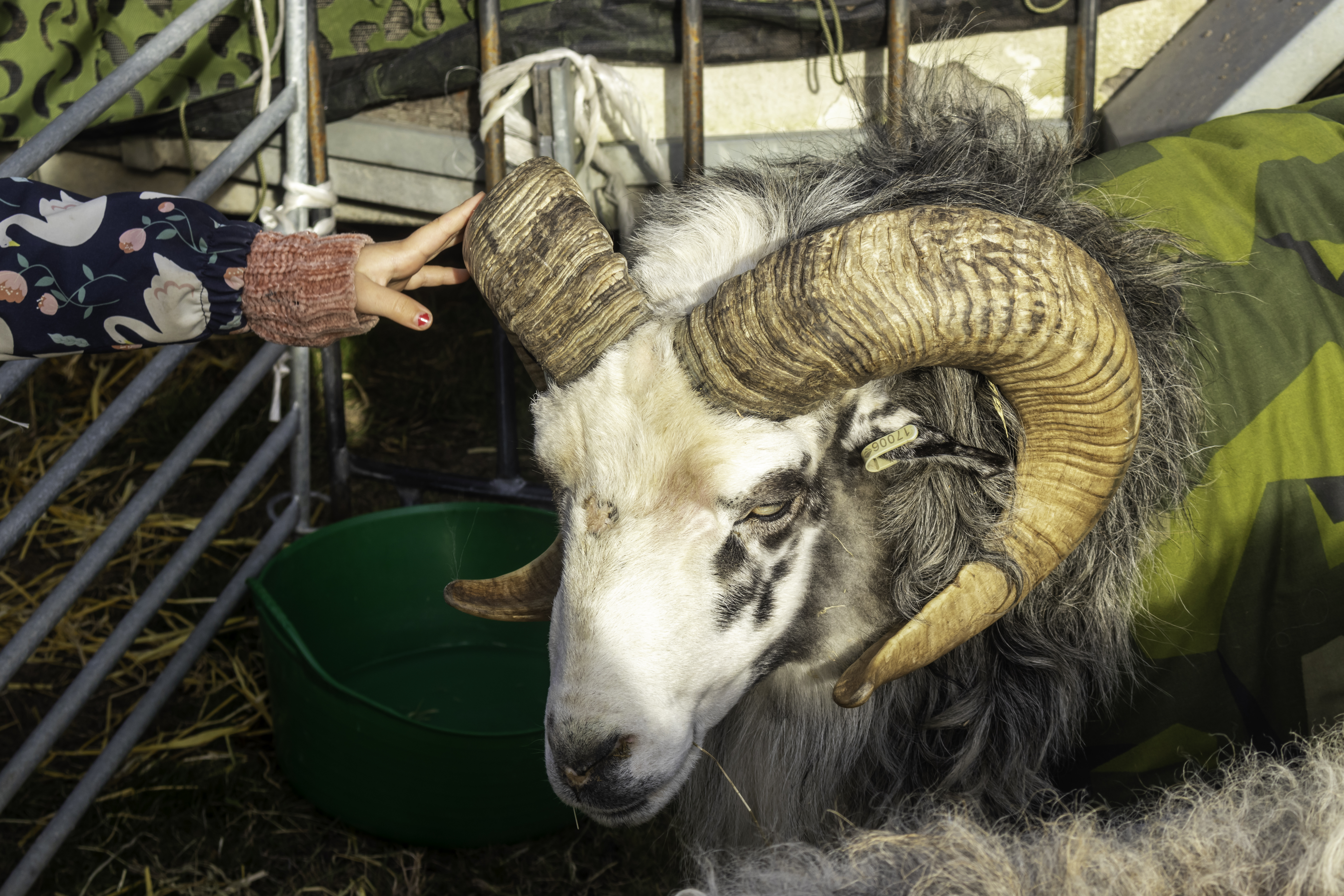
- Harald VI in 2024
- Breed: Gute
- Sex: Male
- Born: 7 April 2017 (age 9)
- Nationality: Sweden
- Employer: Swedish Army
- Years active: 2020–2026
- Known for: Former mascot of the Gotland Regiment
- Predecessor: Harald V
- Successor: Harald VII
- Owner: Katarina Amér

Harald VI (born 7 April 2017) is a Swedish Gute ram who previously served as the mascot for the Gotland Regiment and Gotland Battlegroup.

He was the sixth ram to hold the role, continuing a regimental tradition that began in 1979. Harald VI would appear at regimental ceremonies and public events, where he served as a symbol of Gotland's cultural heritage.

== Life ==
Harald VI was born on 7 April 2017 in Fardhem, Gotland County, to local sheep breeder Katarina Amér. He belongs to the Gute breed, a heritage landrace native to Gotland that descends from the island's ancient horned outfield sheep and is regarded as one of Sweden’s oldest domestic sheep varieties.

As a lamb he was kept alongside his predecessor, Harald V, which accustomed him to human contact and ceremonial environments. Amér, who has long specialised in breeding Gute sheep, described Harald VI as being fostered "like an adjutant" by Harald V, and later as taking on a similar role with younger rams in her flock.

== History ==
The Gotland Regiment is the only regiment in the Swedish Armed Forces to maintain a live animal mascot. The tradition of using Gute rams began in 1979 with Harald I, who was later promoted to second lieutenant after serving in ceremonies including the royal guard at Stockholm Palace. Since then, successive rams named Harald have represented the regiment, serving as living symbols of Gotland’s cultural heritage and sheep-farming traditions.

Following the sudden death of Harald V in September 2019, Harald VI was recruited as the next mascot at the age of two. He made his official debut in January 2020 at the ceremony marking the transfer of the Gotland Battlegroup's command from the Skaraborg Regiment to the Gotland Regiment.

Harald VI took part in several regimental events each year, including parades, transfer ceremonies, and public celebrations. Before such occasions his owner, Amér, would be informed of the schedule and duration of the assignment. For official duties he wore a specially made uniform in the M90 camouflage pattern.

On 5 February 2026, Harald VI retired as regimental mascot and was succeeded by Harald VII.

== See also ==
- Gotland Regiment
- Gotland Battlegroup

== Sources ==
- Fagerstedt, Therese (25 May 2018). "Emotional ceremony at the celebration of the establishment of the Gotland Regiment". Swedish Armed Forces.
- Widehed, Maria (10 September 2019). "Gutebaggen som blev en symbol för något större". Officers' Magazine (in Swedish).
- Skoog, David (29 October 2019). "Harald V har fått en efterträdare". Helagotland (in Swedish).
- Widegren, Patrik (29 October 2019). "Ny gutebagge redo för militärtjänst". Sveriges Television (in Swedish).
- Ihreskog, Magnus (4 January 2020). "Harald VI redo för sitt första maskot-uppdrag". Helagotland (in Swedish).
- Widegren, Patrik (8 January 2020). ""Lysande premiär" för den militära gutebaggen Harald VI". Sveriges Television (in Swedish).
- SSBA (7 June 2023). "Gutefår" (in Swedish). Swedish Sheep Breeding Association.
- Wallin, Tobias (6 February 2026). "Möt militärmaskoten Harald VII som nu fått sin titel". Sveriges Television (in Swedish).
