= Gotland Battlegroup =

Active Swedish Army formation

Coordinates: 57°36′48″N 18°16′57″E

- Stridsgrupp Gotland
- Active: 2016–present
- Country: Sweden
- Branch: Swedish Army
- Size: Brigade
- Part of: Gotland Regiment (peacetime); Army Staff (wartime)
- Headquarters: Visby Garrison, Gotland
- Mottos: Semper in fronte; ('Always foremost')
- Beret colour: Black
- Mascot: Harald VII

Commanders
- Commander: Col Dan Rasmussen

The Gotland Battlegroup, (Note: Swedish: Stridsgrupp Gotland, pronounced [ˈstriːdsˌɡrɵp ˈɡɔtːland]) or the 18th Battlegroup, (Note: Swedish: 18. stridsgruppen, pronounced [ˈɑːʈɔnˌdɛ ˈstriːdsˌɡrɵpːən]) is a reduced Swedish Army mechanised brigade based in Gotland County. It has been active since 2016. The battlegroup is headquartered at Visby Garrison.

== History ==
=== Remilitarisation ===
In 2004, the island of Gotland was demilitarised following reduced tensions in the Baltic Sea after the end of the Cold War, on the assumption that no immediate threat to Swedish sovereignty remained. The decision, however, left a gap in the island’s defence.

After Russia’s annexation of Crimea in 2014 and the subsequent deterioration of the security situation in the Baltic region, the Swedish government introduced the Defence Act of 2015, which mandated the remilitarisation of Gotland by 2018.

=== Establishment ===
Swedish Chief of Defence General Micael Bydén decided to accelerate the process, bringing it forward to autumn 2016. A battlegroup, roughly equivalent to a reduced brigade, was established with the purpose of deterring small-scale attacks and delaying larger assaults until reinforcements and additional units could arrive.

The Skaraborg Regiment was tasked with raising the new unit and temporarily deployed elements to the island under its command, ensuring a limited defensive presence until permanent forces could be established.

As the Gotland Regiment was re-established and gradually regained capability, responsibility for the battlegroup was progressively transferred, and in 2020, once the battlegroup had reached full operational status, full command was formally handed over from the Skaraborg Regiment to the Gotland Regiment.

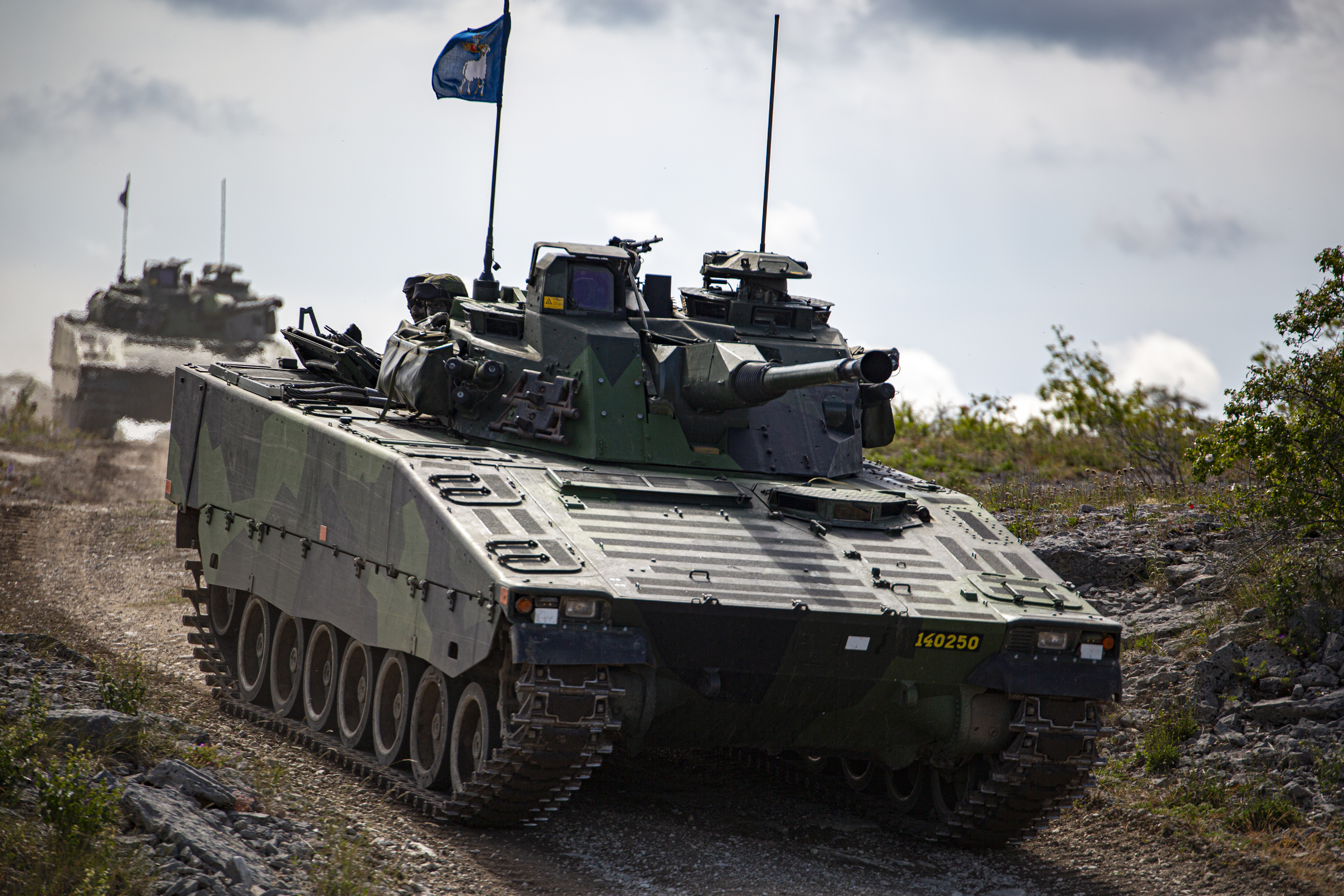
Combat Vehicle 90 of the 181st Mechanised Battalion.

=== Organisation ===
In peacetime, the battlegroup is cadre-organised as a subordinate unit of the Gotland Regiment, while in wartime it is placed directly under the Army Staff rather than the 1st Division, as is the case for other brigades.

As of 2022, the battlegroup's wartime organisation is planned to expand, with full implementation expected by 2028 at the latest:

- 18th Battlegroup
  - 18th Battlegroup Staff
    - 18th Headquarters Company
    - 18th Air Defence Unit
  - 181st Mechanised Battalion
  - 18th Engineer Company
  - 18th Artillery Company
  - 18th Support Company

Given its specialised role, the battlegroup is not intended for deployment outside Gotland and maintains a permanent presence on the island.

== Traditions ==
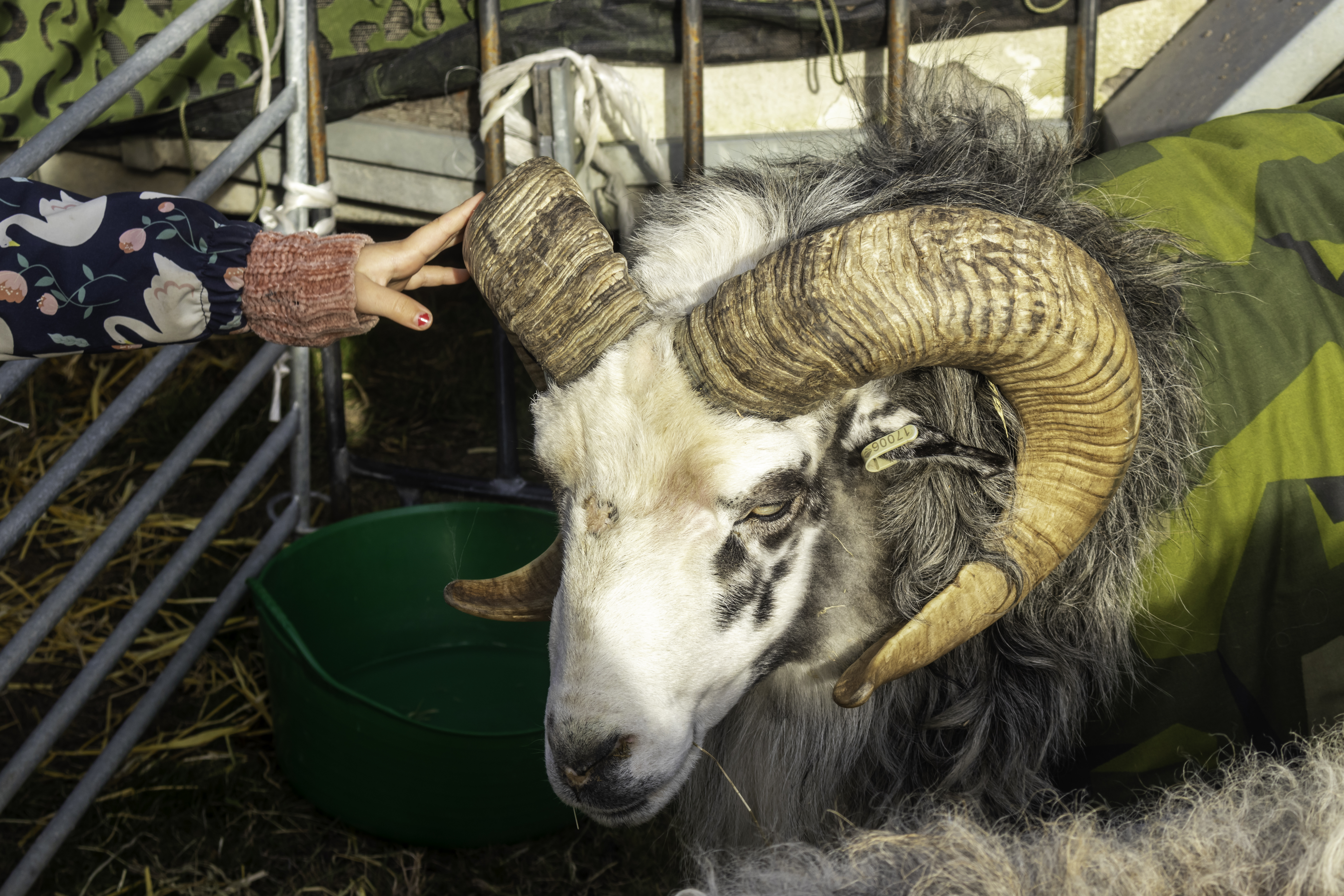
Harald VI in 2024.

Harald VII, successor to Harald VI, is the mascot of the Gotland Regiment as well as the battlegroup.

The coat of arms of the battlegroup, which it shares with the Gotland Regiment, features a Gute ram symbolising strength and resilience.

The most common beret colour in the battlegroup is black, in accordance with the tradition of the Swedish Armoured Troops.

The battlegroup’s motto is Semper in fronte, Latin for 'Always foremost'.

== Commanders ==
The commanders of the brigade throughout its history are as follows:

- 2017–????: Col Stefan Pettersson
- ????–present: Col Dan Rasmussen

== Attributes ==
Attributes and locations of the Gotland Battlegroup
Name	Translation	From	To
Stridsgrupp Gotland	Gotland Battlegroup	14 September 2016	–
Designation		From	To
SG GTL		14 September 2016	–
Location		From	To
Visby Garrison		14 September 2016	–

== See also ==
- List of Swedish Army brigades

== Sources ==
- Wiktorin, Johan (10 March 2014). "Försvara Gotland – Varför och Hur?". kkrva.se (in Swedish). Royal Swedish Academy of War Sciences.
- Försvarsmakten (2015). "Uniformsbestämmelser 2015" (PDF). Reglemente (in Swedish). Stockholm: Swedish Armed Forces.
- Försvarsmakten (14 September 2016). Tidigarelagd etablering på Gotland (Video) (in Swedish). Försvarsmakten – via YouTube.
- Widegren, Patrik (17 November 2017). "Stridsgrupp Gotland officiellt invigd" (in Swedish). Sveriges Television.
- Gummesson, Jonas (1 July 2017). "Stridsgrupp Gotland tillbaka – med stora luckor". Svenska Dagbladet (in Swedish).
- Widehed, Maria; Owetz, Josefine; Hjorth, Anna (2019). "Full rustat Gotland dröjer" (PDF). Officerstidningen (in Swedish) (5). officersforbundet.se.
- Ihreskog, Magnus (4 January 2020). "Harald VI redo för sitt första maskot-uppdrag" (in Swedish). Helagotland.
- Sjögren, Anna-Lie (9 January 2020). "Stridsgruppen – en del av Gotlands regemente". forsvarsmakten.se (in Swedish). Swedish Armed Forces.
- Freeman, Suzanne (30 September 2021). "Are Current Russian Expeditionary Capabilities Capable of a Coup de Main in Sweden?". Center for Strategic and International Studies.
- Carr, David; Moldvik, Jesper (8 December 2022). "Lyckat startskott för ett robustare Gotland" (in Swedish). Swedish Armed Forces.
- Försvarsmakten (2022). "Planerad utveckling av krigsorganisationen 2021-2030" [Planned development of the war organization 2021-2030] (PDF). forsvarsmakten.se (in Swedish). Swedish Armed Forces. Archived from the original (PDF) on 10 March 2022.
- Försvarsmakten (9 May 2025). "Gotlands regemente". forsvarsmakten.se (in Swedish). Swedish Armed Forces.
- Expressen (15 May 2025). Nato: Så ska Gotland användas mot Putin (Video) (in Swedish). Expressen – via YouTube.
- Wallin, Tobias (6 February 2026). "Möt militärmaskoten Harald VII som nu fått sin titel". Sveriges Television (in Swedish).
