= Västerhejde =

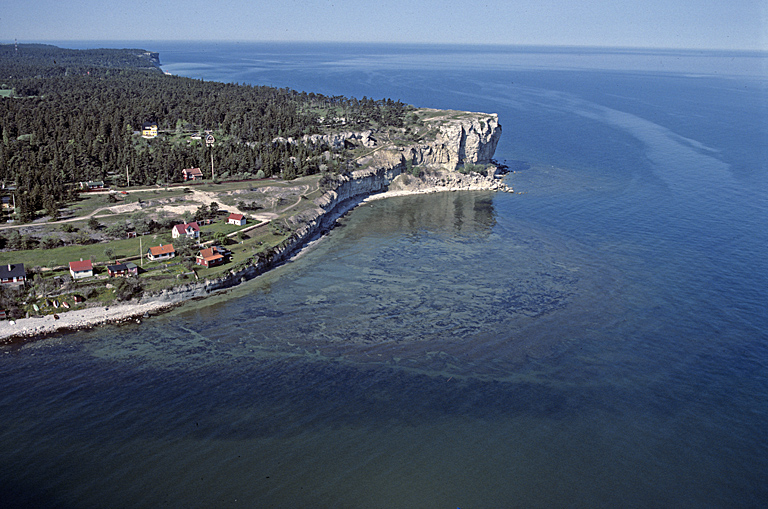
- Västerhejde coastline with Högklint cliff

- Location within Gotland
- Coordinates: 57°35′N 18°15′E
- Country: Sweden
- Province: Gotland
- County: Gotland County
- Municipality: Gotland Municipality

Area
  - Total: 0.53 km^{2} (0.20 sq mi)

Population (31 December 2014)
  - Total: 2,306
- Time zone: UTC+1 (CET)
  - Summer (DST): UTC+2 (CEST)

Västerhejde is a locality on the Swedish island of Gotland.

Västerhejde is also the name of the larger populated area known as a socken (not to be confused with parish). It comprises the same area as the administrative Västerhejde District, established on 1 January 2016.

== Geography ==
Västerhejde is the name of the locality surrounding the medieval Västerhejde Church, sometimes referred to as Västerhejde kyrkby. It is also the name of the socken as well as the district. Västerhejde is located along the coast in the mid-western part of Gotland. As of 2019, Västerhejde Church belongs to Stenkumla parish, along with the churches in Stenkumla, Träkumla, and Vibble.

Located within Västerhejde socken are the settlements of Vibble, Bjärs, and Nygårds fishing village with an adjacent manor and sheep farm, as well as Högklint, a small settlement by the coast. Högklint is also the name of the high cliff with an almost vertical 48 m (157 ft) drop down to the sea and contains several small caves in the steep cliff side.

One of the asteroids in the asteroid belt, 10554 Västerhejde, is named after this place.
