= List of Swedish counties by life expectancy =

According to estimation of the United Nations, in 2023 life expectancy in Sweden was 83.26 years (81.44 for male, 85.10 for female).

Estimation of the World Bank Group for 2023: 83.31 years total (81.70 for male, 85.00 for female).

Estimation of Eurostat for 2023: 83.4 years total (81.7 for male, 85.0 for female).

According to estimation of the WHO for 2019, at that year life expectancy in Sweden was 82.71 years (81.17 years for male and 84.24 years for female).
And healthy life expectancy was 71.41 years (71.33 years for male and 71.46 years for female).

== Statistics Sweden ==
Average values for 5-year periods. By default the table is sorted by arithmetic mean for 2020-2024. Some values are rounded.

county	2014-2018				change	2019-2023				change	2020-2024			
county	male	female	sex gap	arith. mean	change	male	female	sex gap	arith. mean	change	male	female	sex gap	arith. mean
Sweden	80.55	84.10	3.55	82.33	0.62	81.21	84.69	3.48	82.95	0.16	81.40	84.81	3.41	83.11
Halland County	81.52	84.78	3.26	83.15	0.88	82.52	85.53	3.01	84.03	0.08	82.64	85.57	2.93	84.11
Stockholm County	81.04	84.56	3.52	82.80	0.78	81.74	85.41	3.67	83.58	0.24	82.07	85.57	3.50	83.82
Uppsala County	81.38	84.65	3.27	83.02	0.59	82.00	85.22	3.22	83.61	0.06	82.06	85.29	3.23	83.67
Kronoberg County	81.56	84.73	3.17	83.14	0.31	81.96	84.95	2.99	83.45	0.09	82.09	85.00	2.91	83.55
Jönköping County	81.00	84.54	3.54	82.77	0.55	81.55	85.08	3.53	83.31	0.16	81.75	85.19	3.44	83.47
Gotland County	80.43	84.18	3.75	82.31	1.04	81.32	85.38	4.06	83.35	0.12	81.40	85.53	4.13	83.47
Dalarna County	80.47	83.82	3.35	82.14	0.84	81.20	84.76	3.56	82.98	0.16	81.51	84.78	3.27	83.14
Kalmar County	80.18	83.88	3.70	82.03	1.05	81.24	84.91	3.67	83.08	0.06	81.33	84.95	3.62	83.14
Östergötland County	80.78	84.20	3.42	82.49	0.47	81.34	84.57	3.23	82.95	0.13	81.41	84.76	3.35	83.08
Västra Götaland County	80.53	84.07	3.54	82.30	0.54	81.11	84.57	3.46	82.84	0.16	81.26	84.75	3.49	83.00
Skåne County	80.59	84.22	3.63	82.41	0.46	81.14	84.59	3.45	82.86	0.14	81.32	84.68	3.36	83.00
Örebro County	79.91	84.03	4.12	81.97	0.66	80.71	84.55	3.84	82.63	0.20	80.99	84.67	3.68	82.83
Västerbotten County	80.36	83.68	3.32	82.02	0.68	81.16	84.24	3.08	82.70	0.05	81.23	84.26	3.03	82.75
Värmland County	79.75	83.80	4.05	81.78	0.83	80.71	84.50	3.79	82.61	0.10	80.83	84.59	3.76	82.71
Jämtland County	80.04	83.54	3.50	81.79	0.63	80.70	84.15	3.45	82.42	0.26	81.11	84.26	3.15	82.69
Västmanland County	80.33	83.87	3.54	82.10	0.31	80.53	84.29	3.76	82.41	0.25	80.87	84.44	3.57	82.66
Blekinge County	79.77	83.84	4.07	81.81	0.76	81.02	84.12	3.10	82.57	0.08	81.08	84.22	3.14	82.65
Södermanland County	80.03	83.78	3.75	81.91	0.38	80.61	83.95	3.34	82.28	0.16	80.79	84.08	3.29	82.44
Gävleborg County	79.54	83.05	3.51	81.30	0.74	80.22	83.85	3.63	82.03	0.16	80.46	83.92	3.46	82.19
Norrbotten County	79.14	83.20	4.06	81.17	0.56	79.95	83.52	3.57	81.73	0.22	80.10	83.82	3.72	81.96
Västernorrland County	79.54	83.00	3.46	81.27	0.54	80.09	83.52	3.43	81.81	0.11	80.09	83.74	3.65	81.92

Data source: Statistics Sweden (SCB).

Maps of division of Sweden into counties and NUTS-2 regions:

- AB: Stockholm County
- AC: Västerbotten County
- BD: Norrbotten County
- C: Uppsala County
- D: Södermanland County
- E: Östergötland County
- F: Jönköping County
- G: Kronoberg County
- H: Kalmar County
- I: Gotland County
- K: Blekinge County
- M: Skåne County
- N: Halland County
- O: Västra Götaland County
- S: Värmland County
- T: Örebro County
- U: Västmanland County
- W: Dalarna County
- X: Gävleborg County
- Y: Västernorrland County
- Z: Jämtland County

== Eurostat (2014—2023) ==
By default, the table is sorted by 2023.

code	NUTS-2 region	2014				2014 →2019	2019				2019 →2023	2023				2014 →2023
code	NUTS-2 region	overall	male	female	F Δ M	2014 →2019	overall	male	female	F Δ M	2019 →2023	overall	male	female	F Δ M	2014 →2023
	Sweden on average	82.3	80.4	84.2	3.8	0.9	83.2	81.5	84.8	3.3	0.2	83.4	81.7	85.0	3.3	1.1
SE11	Stockholm	82.7	80.9	84.4	3.5	1.2	83.9	81.9	85.7	3.8	0.6	84.5	82.8	86.0	3.2	1.8
SE21	Småland and the islands	82.7	80.7	84.7	4.0	0.9	83.6	81.9	85.3	3.4	−0.1	83.5	82.0	85.1	3.1	0.8
SE23	West Sweden	82.4	80.5	84.4	3.9	0.7	83.1	81.4	84.7	3.3	0.3	83.4	81.7	85.0	3.3	1.0
SE12	East Middle Sweden	82.5	80.7	84.2	3.5	0.5	83.0	81.4	84.7	3.3	0.2	83.2	81.6	84.9	3.3	0.7
SE22	South Sweden	82.2	80.2	84.2	4.0	0.9	83.1	81.6	84.6	3.0	−0.1	83.0	81.3	84.8	3.5	0.8
SE31	North Middle Sweden	81.7	79.8	83.5	3.7	1.0	82.7	80.8	84.6	3.8	0.1	82.8	81.2	84.6	3.4	1.1
SE33	Upper Norrland	81.5	79.6	83.6	4.0	0.7	82.2	80.6	83.8	3.2	0.2	82.4	80.6	84.3	3.7	0.9
SE32	Middle Norrland	81.1	79.4	82.9	3.5	1.0	82.1	80.4	83.9	3.5	0.2	82.3	80.8	83.9	3.1	1.2

Data source: Eurostat

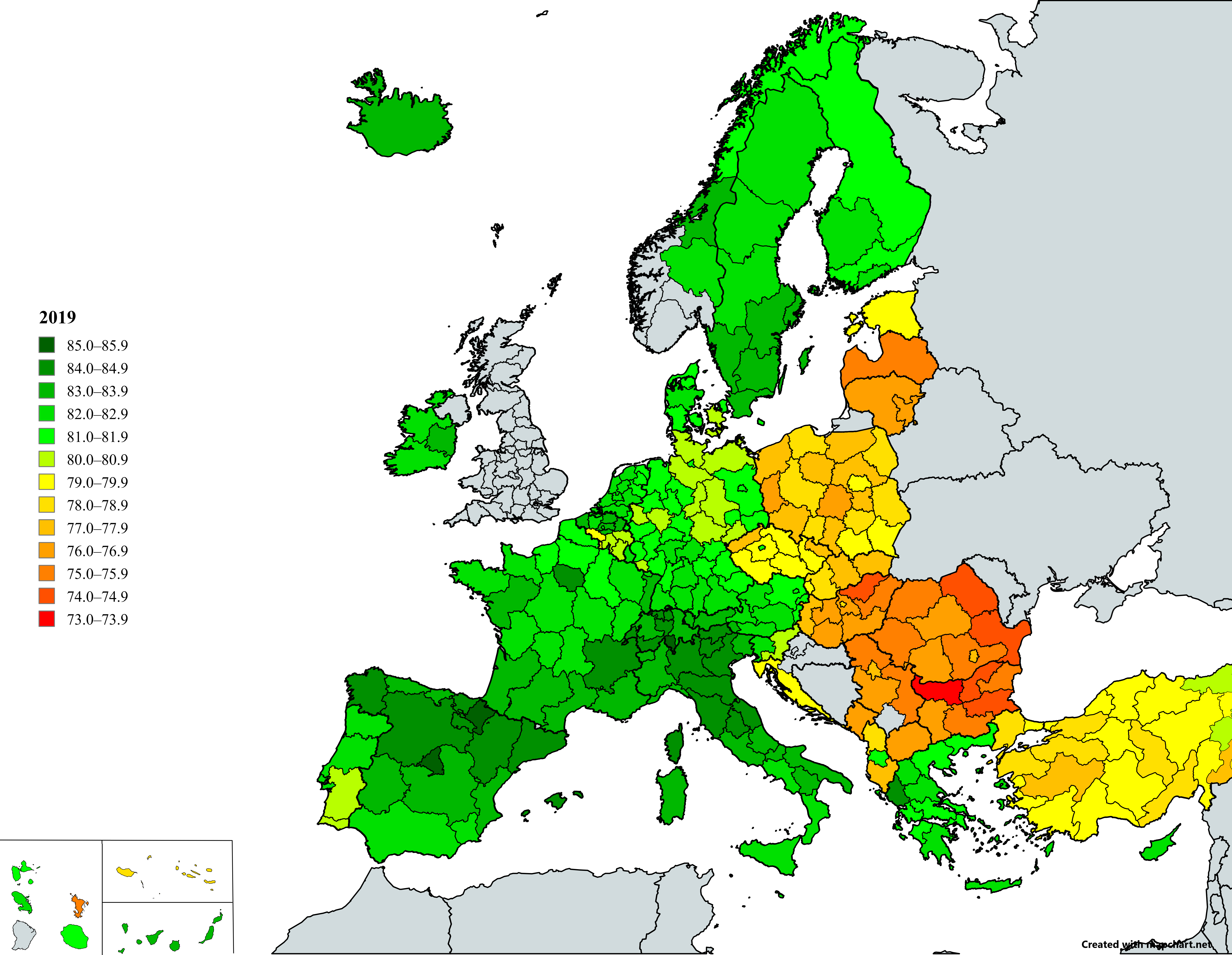
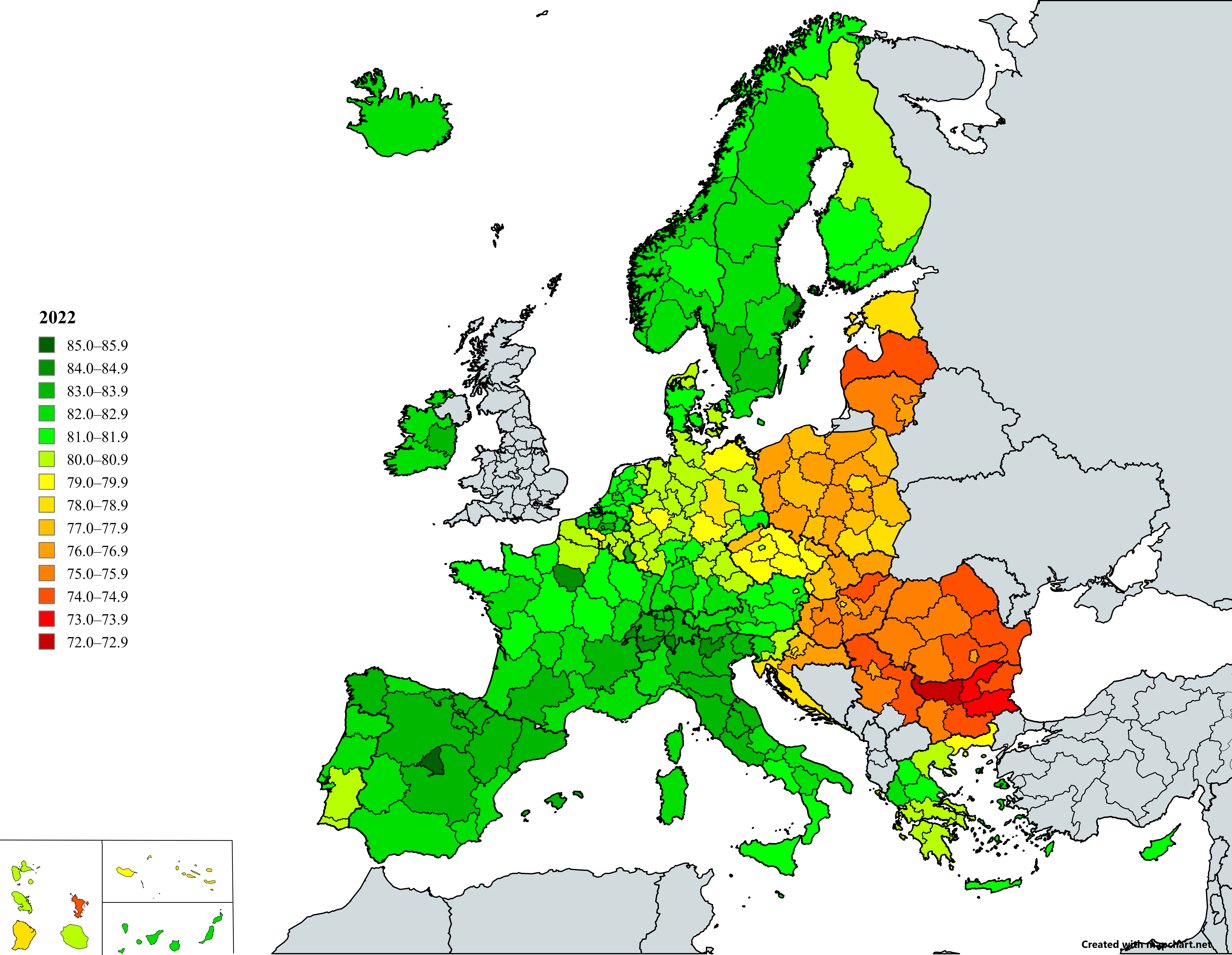
Life expectancy in Swedish regions in comparison with regions of other European countries in 2019 and 2022, according to Eurostat
(legends on the maps are identical)

== Global Data Lab (2019–2022) ==
region	2019				2019 →2021	2021	2021 →2022	2022				2019 →2022
region	overall	male	female	F Δ M	2019 →2021	overall	2021 →2022	overall	male	female	F Δ M	2019 →2022
Sweden on average	83.05	81.35	84.73	3.38	−0.07	82.98	0.53	83.51	81.90	85.09	3.19	0.46
Stockholm	83.76	81.79	85.55	3.76	0.11	83.87	0.48	84.35	82.74	85.86	3.12	0.59
Småland and the islands	83.46	81.79	85.15	3.36	−0.19	83.27	0.57	83.84	82.03	85.66	3.63	0.38
West Sweden	82.96	81.29	84.55	3.26	0.01	82.97	0.57	83.54	81.93	85.16	3.23	0.58
East Middle Sweden	82.86	81.29	84.55	3.26	−0.09	82.77	0.47	83.24	81.53	84.86	3.33	0.38
South Sweden	82.96	81.49	84.45	2.96	−0.29	82.67	0.37	83.04	81.53	84.66	3.13	0.08
North Middle Sweden	82.56	80.69	84.45	3.76	−0.29	82.27	0.77	83.04	81.53	84.56	3.03	0.48
Upper Norrland	82.06	80.49	83.65	3.16	0.01	82.07	0.57	82.64	81.23	84.06	2.83	0.58
Middle Norrland	81.96	80.29	83.75	3.46	0.01	81.97	0.57	82.54	81.13	83.96	2.83	0.58

Data source: Global Data Lab

== Charts ==
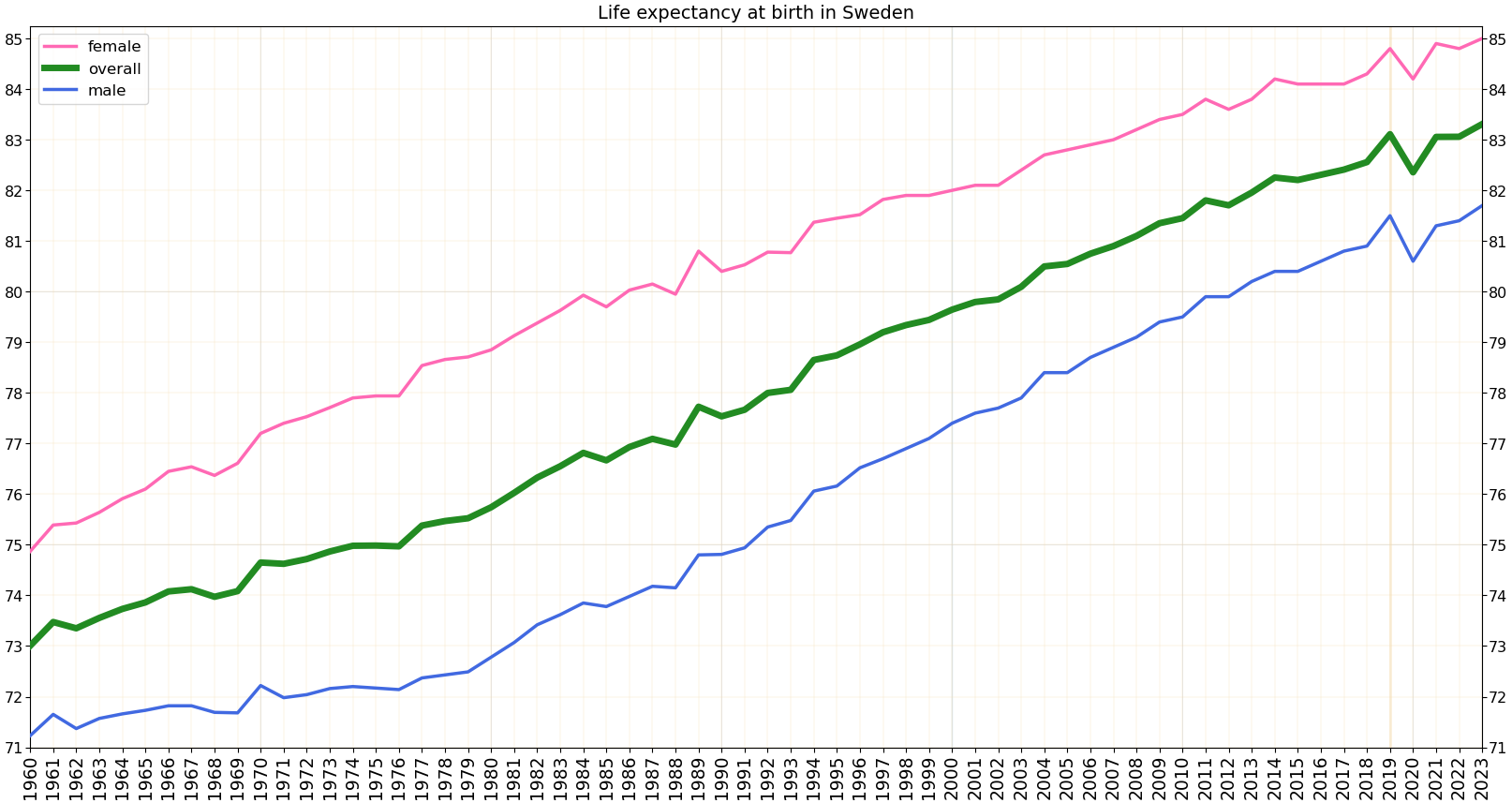
Development of life expectancy in Sweden according to estimation of the World Bank Group

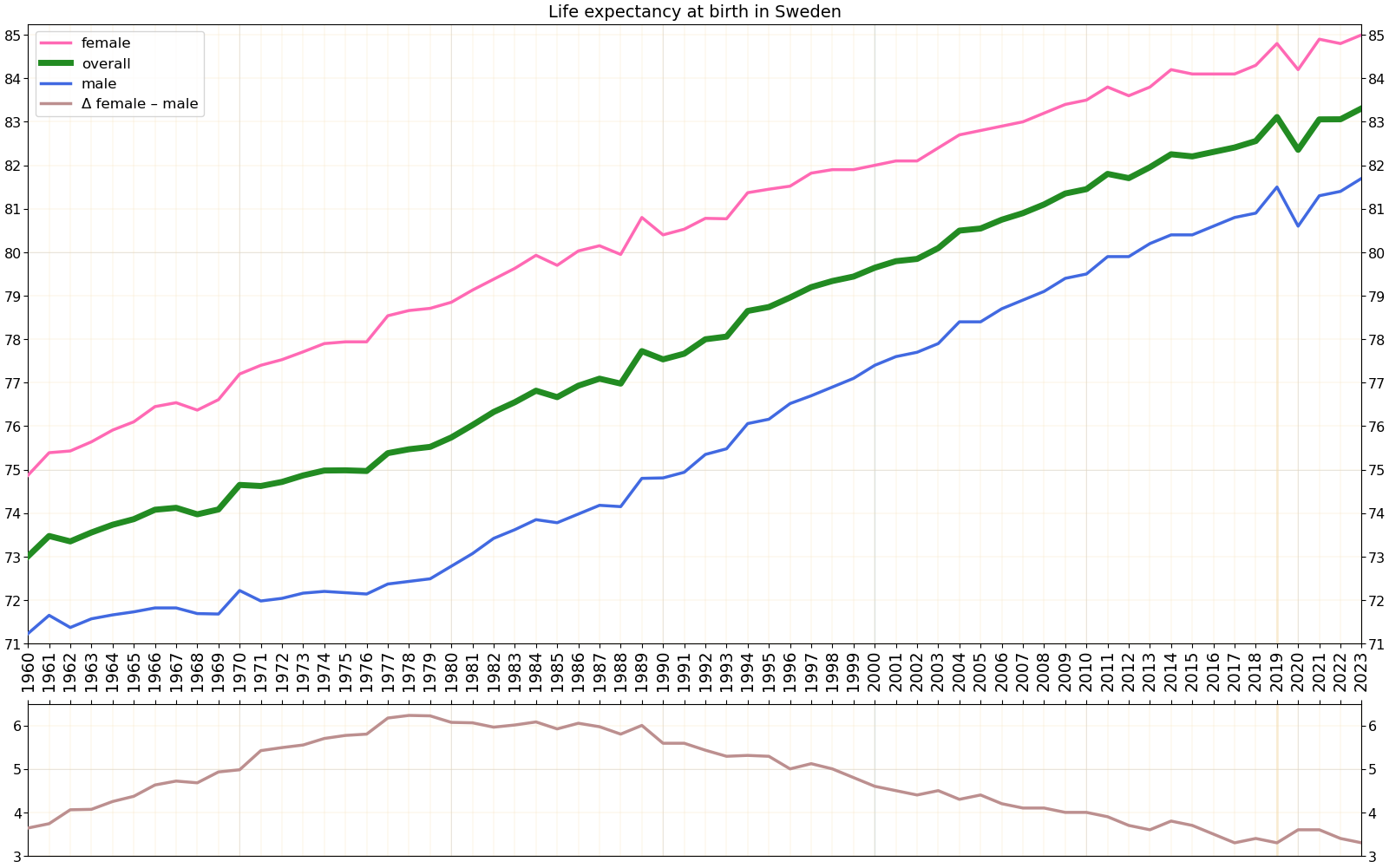
Life expectancy with calculated sex gap

Life expectancy in Sweden according to estimation of Our World in Data

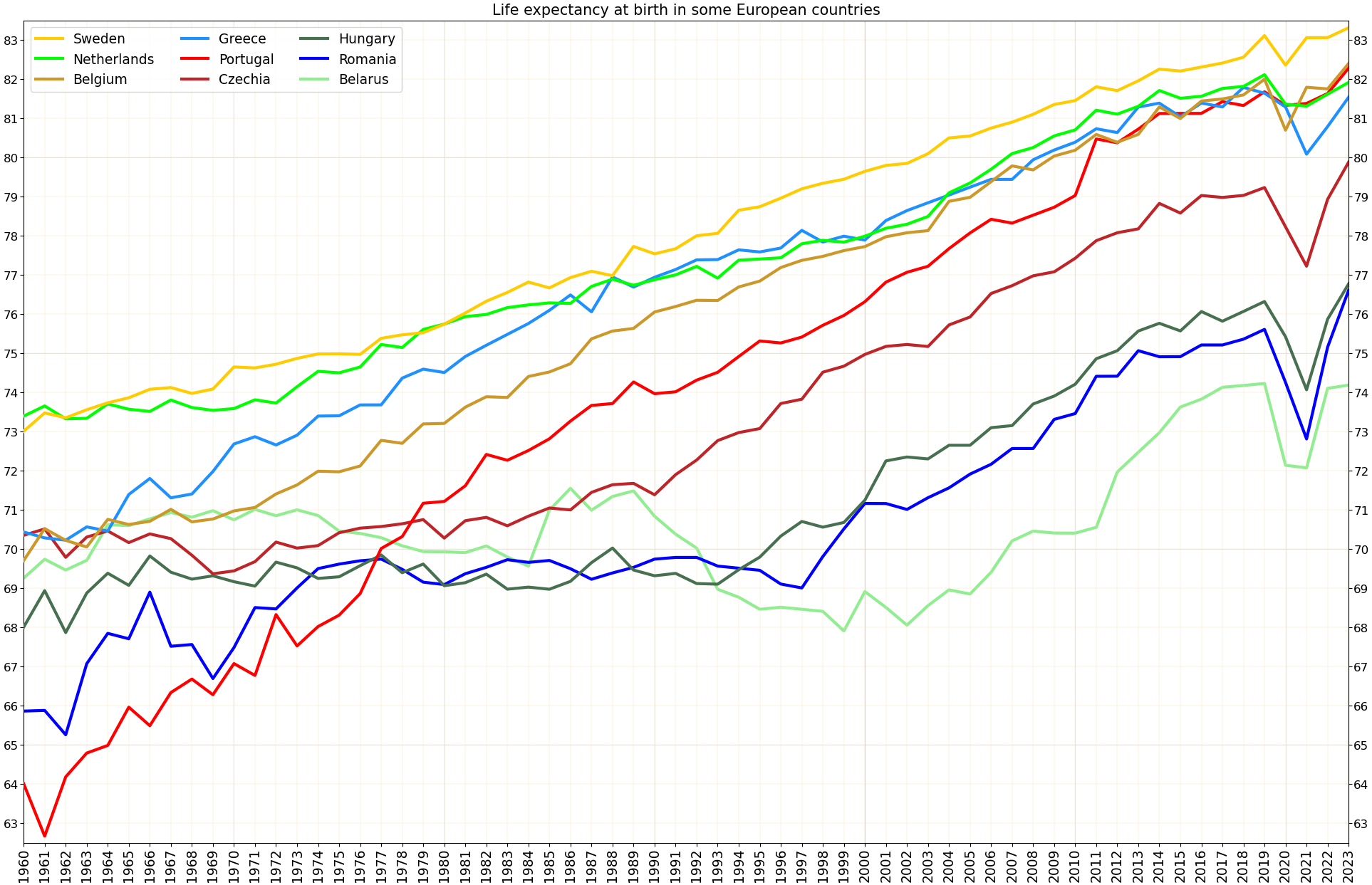
Development of life expectancy in Sweden in comparison to some European countries

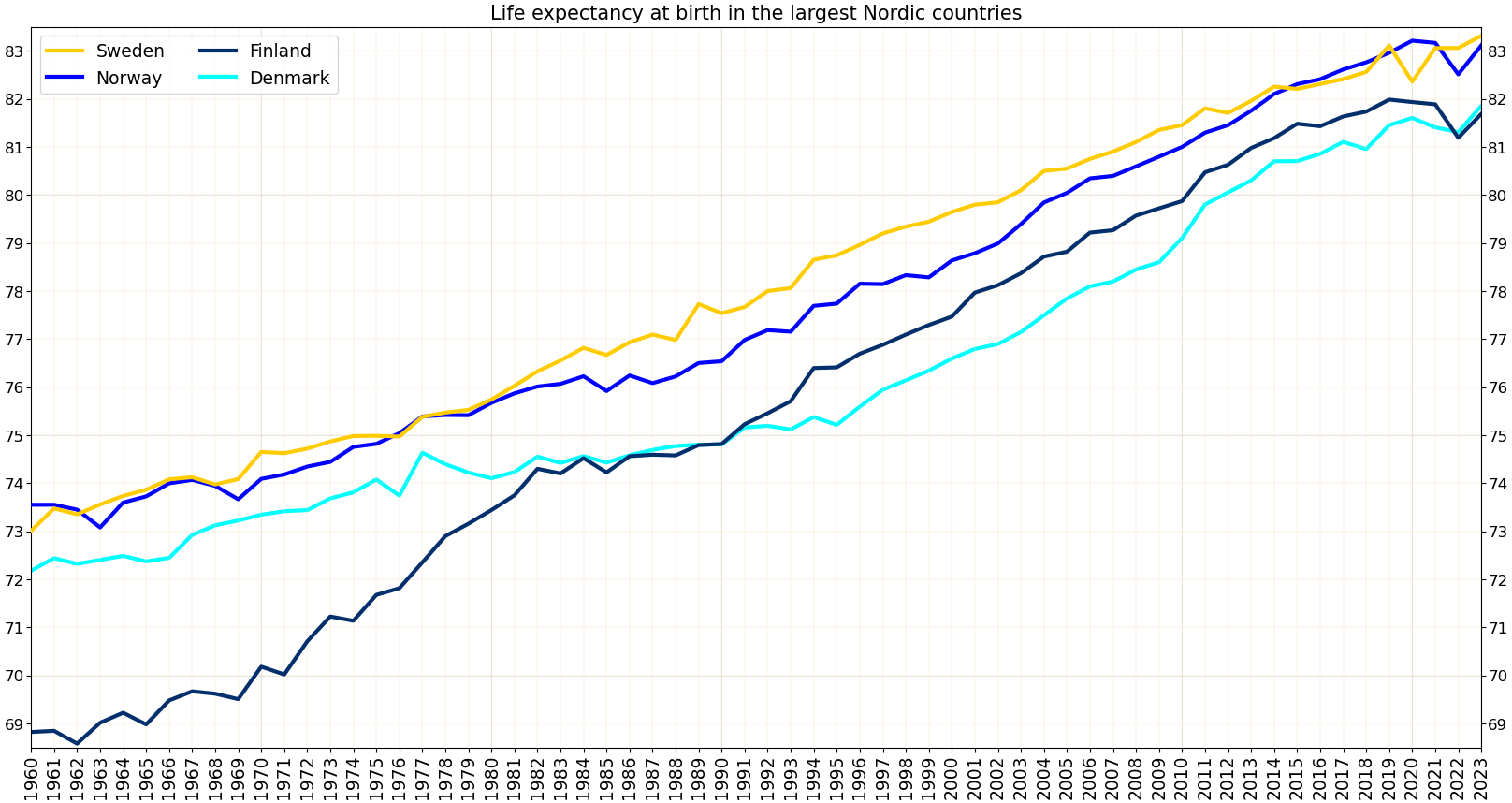
Development of life expectancy in Sweden in comparison to the other large Nordic countries

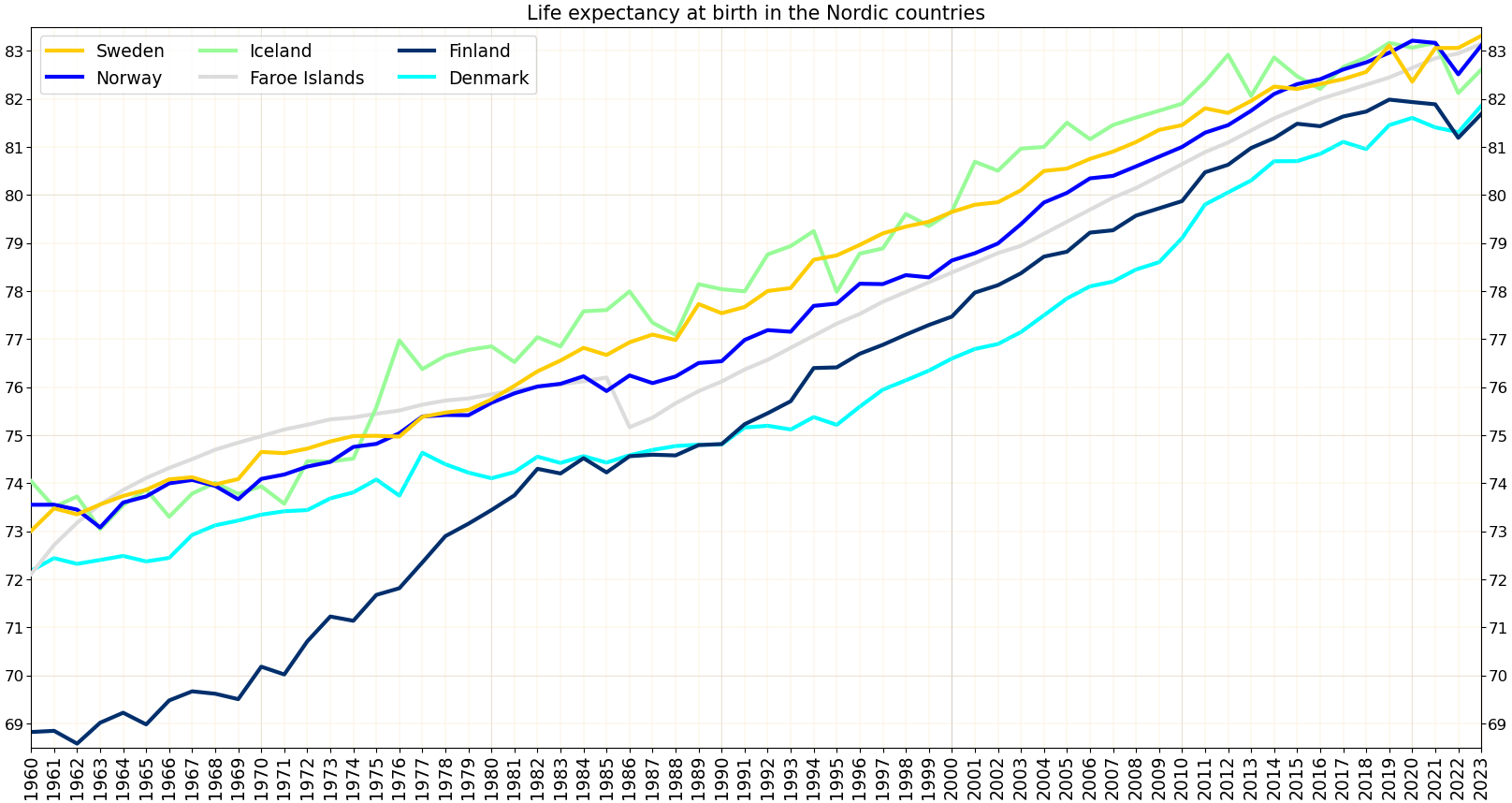
Development of life expectancy in Sweden in comparison to the other Nordic countries
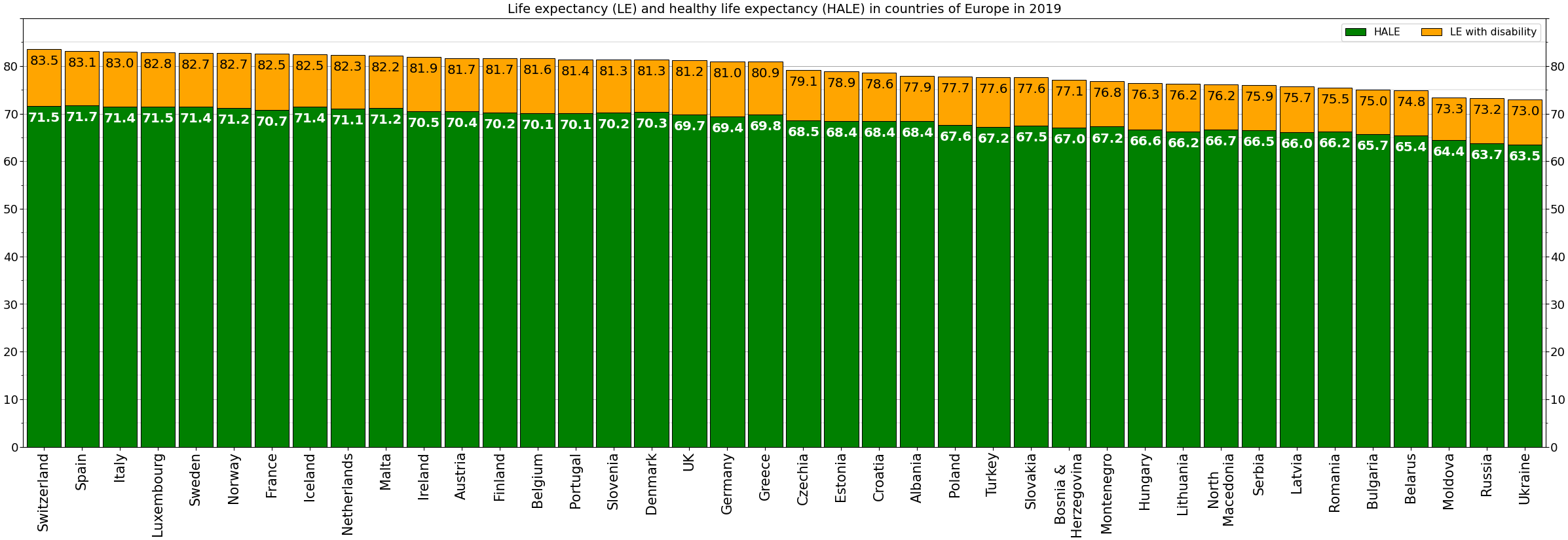
Life expectancy and healthy life expectancy in Sweden on the background of other countries of Europe in 2019

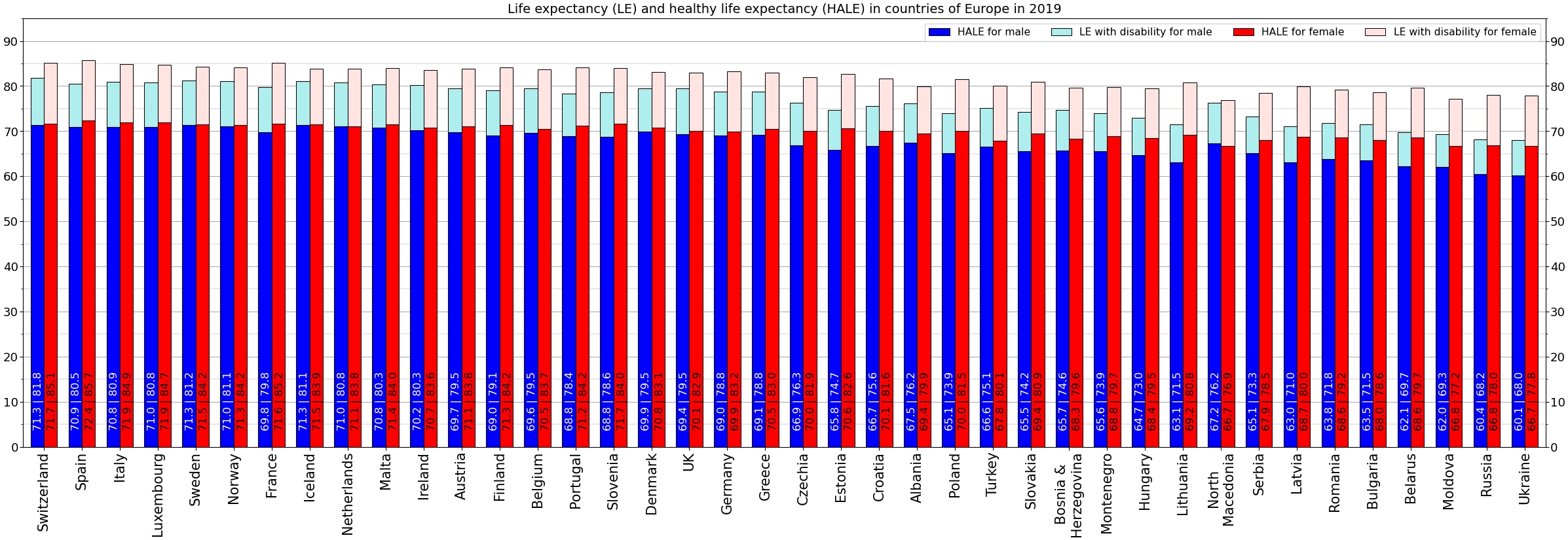
Life expectancy and healthy life expectancy for males and females separately

== See also ==
- List of countries by life expectancy
- List of European countries by life expectancy
- Counties of Sweden
- Demographics of Sweden
