= Västerhejde Church =

- Västerhejde kyrka
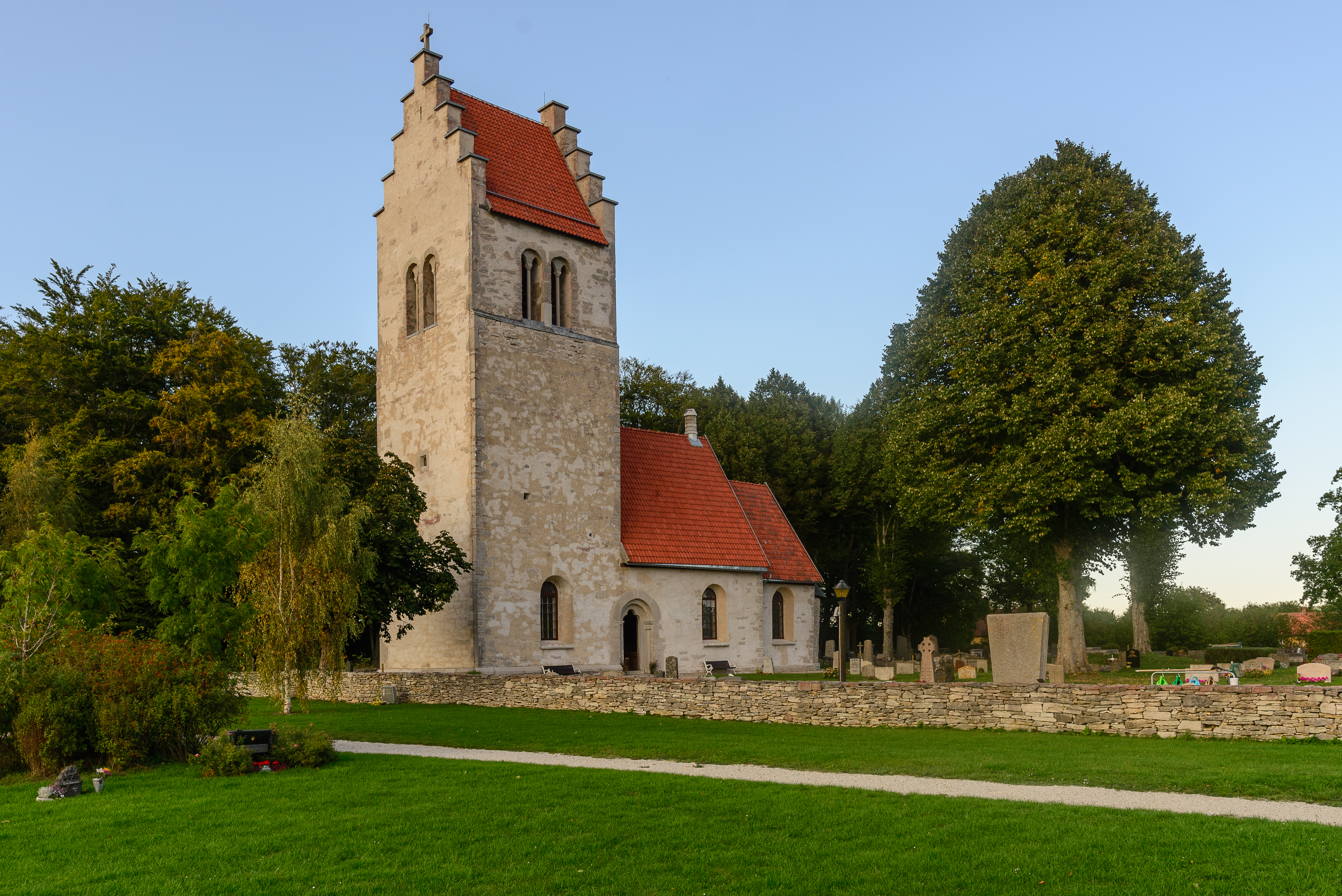
- Västerhejde Church, view of the exterior

- Location within Gotland
- 57°34′50″N 18°14′53″E
- Country: Sweden
- Denomination: Church of Sweden

Administration
- Diocese: Visby

Västerhejde Church (Swedish: Västerhejde kyrka) is a medieval church in Västerhejde on the island of Gotland, Sweden. Dating from the 13th century, it was somewhat altered during the 19th century. It belongs to the Diocese of Visby.

== History and architecture ==
The church was built in Romanesque style during the 13th century, but underwent some changes during the 19th century. The southern portal was then removed, and the spire of the tower changed from its original, pointed design to its presently visible crow-stepped design, traditionally not found on churches of Gotland. The altarpiece, pulpit and pews date from the 17th century. An oil painting by Fredric Westin that hangs in the church is a gift from Princess Eugenie of Sweden and Norway, who spent several summers in the countryside near the church.
