= Stenkumla Church =

- Stenkumla kyrka
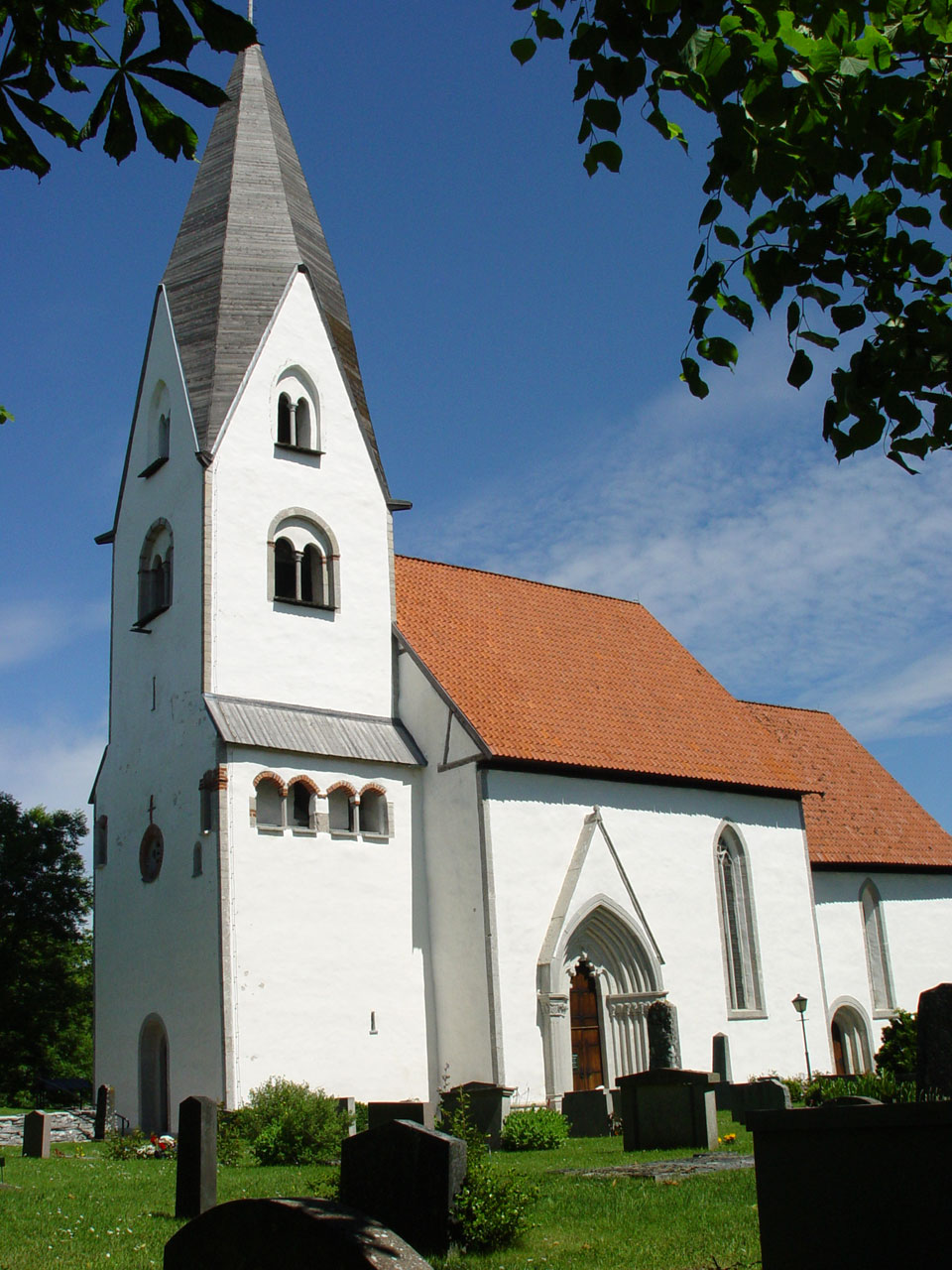
- Stenkumla Church, view of the exterior

- Location within Gotland
- 57°32′51″N 18°16′06″E
- Country: Sweden
- Denomination: Church of Sweden

Administration
- Diocese: Visby

Stenkumla Church (Swedish: Stenkumla kyrka) is a medieval church in Stenkumla on the island of Gotland, Sweden. It belongs to the Diocese of Visby. During the Middle Ages, the church was dedicated to Saint Lawrence.

== History and architecture ==
The oldest part of the church is the tower. It was erected at the beginning of the 13th century. Originally it was attached to a Romanesque church dating from the 12th century, but this was replaced with the current church in stages. The choir thus dates from the middle of the 13th century, while the nave of the church was built at the beginning of the 14th century. The church has remained largely unaltered since the Middle Ages.

The almost square nave is supported by a single central pillar. The walls are decorated with medieval murals from the 15th century, made by the so-called Master of the Passion of Christ. The murals depict the Passion of Christ in one set, and another depicts four female saints, probably Saint Bridget, Saint Elizabeth, Saint Barbara, Saint Catherine and Saint Margaret The windows of the nave contain fragments of the original stained glass window panes, as do the windows of the choir. There is another set of murals in the choir, dating from the 13th century. They depict Saint Lawrence, Saint Peter, Saint Bartholomew and Saint Paul. The choir also contains a wooden tabernacle, dated to the 14th century. Under the chancel arch between the choir and nave, a triumphal cross from the late 12th century is placed; it has been described as the finest piece of art in the church. It was made for the earlier, Romanesque church. It depicts Christ nailed to the cross only through his hands; the feet hang free and in fact are covered with shoes. Other church fittings are from the post-Reformation era, such as the sandstone altarpiece, made in 1681. The pulpit is from the middle of the 17th century and the baptismal font from the 18th century. The church also contains two runestones, dating from the 11th century.

The church cemetery contains the grave of Konrad Petterson Lundqvist Tector, a robber and murderer who was beheaded outside the church on 18 May 1876.
