= Vibble =

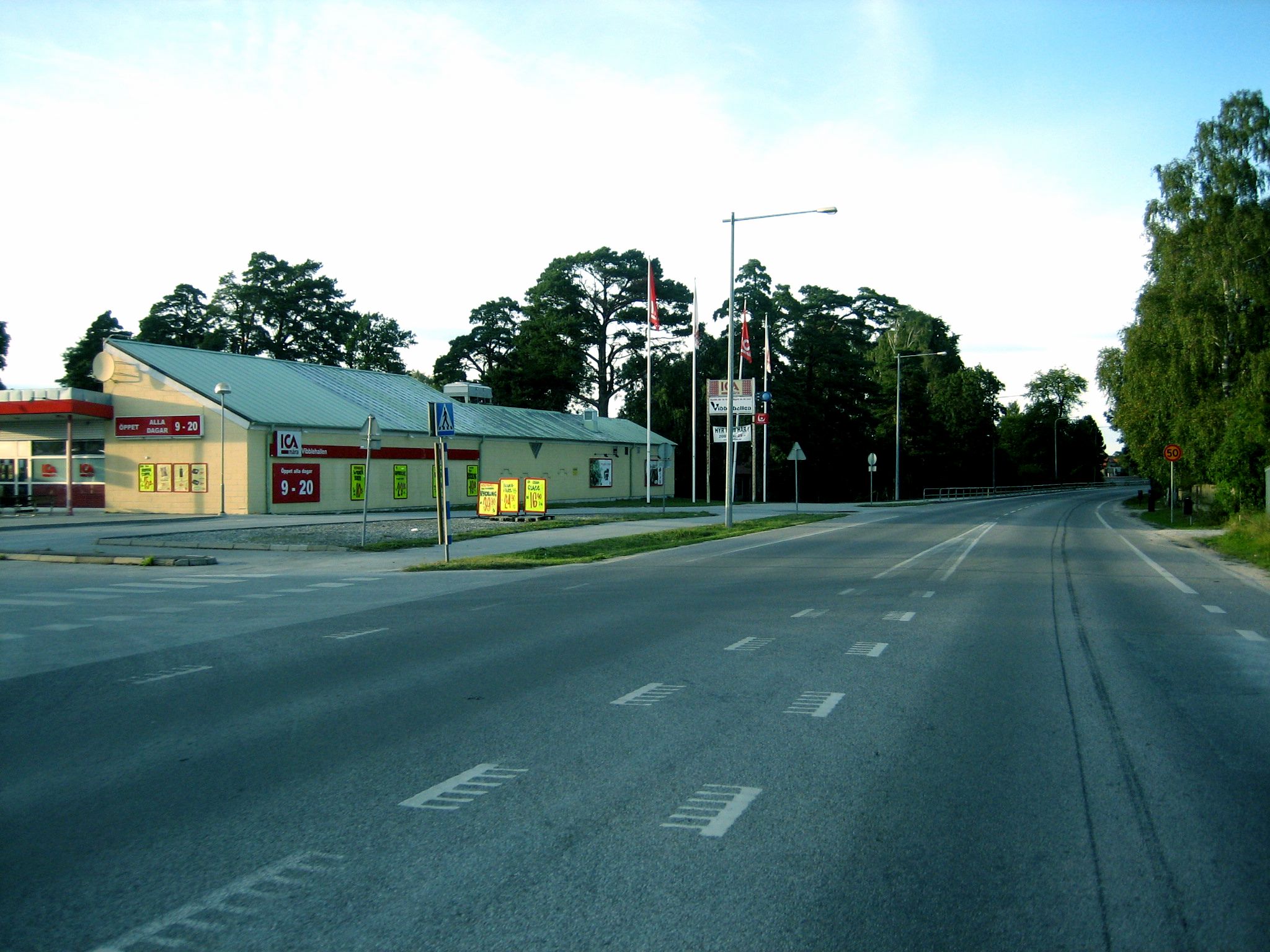
- Central Vibble

- Location within Gotland
- Coordinates: 57°36′N 18°15′E
- Country: Sweden
- Province: Gotland
- County: Gotland County
- Municipality: Gotland Municipality

Area
  - Total: 1.25 km^{2} (0.48 sq mi)

Population (31 December 2010)
  - Total: 1,300
  - Density: 1,028/km^{2} (2,660/sq mi)
- Time zone: UTC+1 (CET)
  - Summer (DST): UTC+2 (CEST)

Vibble is a locality in Västerhejde on the Swedish island of Gotland. Sweden with 1,300 inhabitants in 2010. Situated 3 km (1.9 mi) south of Visby, it is sometimes regarded as a suburb to the town of Visby. The main business in Vibble is tourism. The relocated original Villa Villekulla - where Pippi Longstocking lived - is at the Kneippbyn Holiday Resort in Vibble.

As of 2019, Vibble Chapel belongs to Stenkumla parish, along with the churches in Stenkumla, Träkumla and Västerhejde.

== Gallery ==
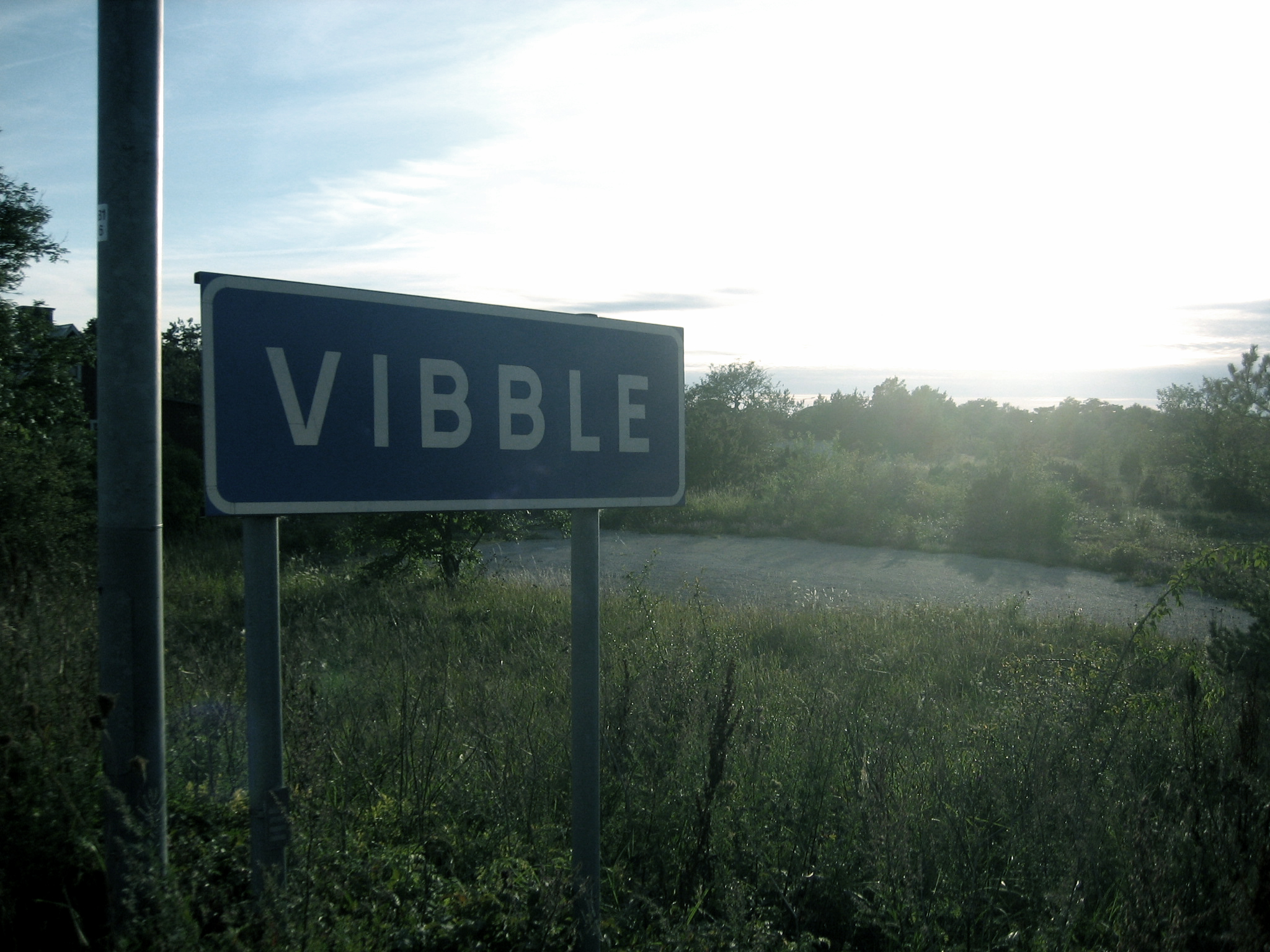
Vibble roadsign

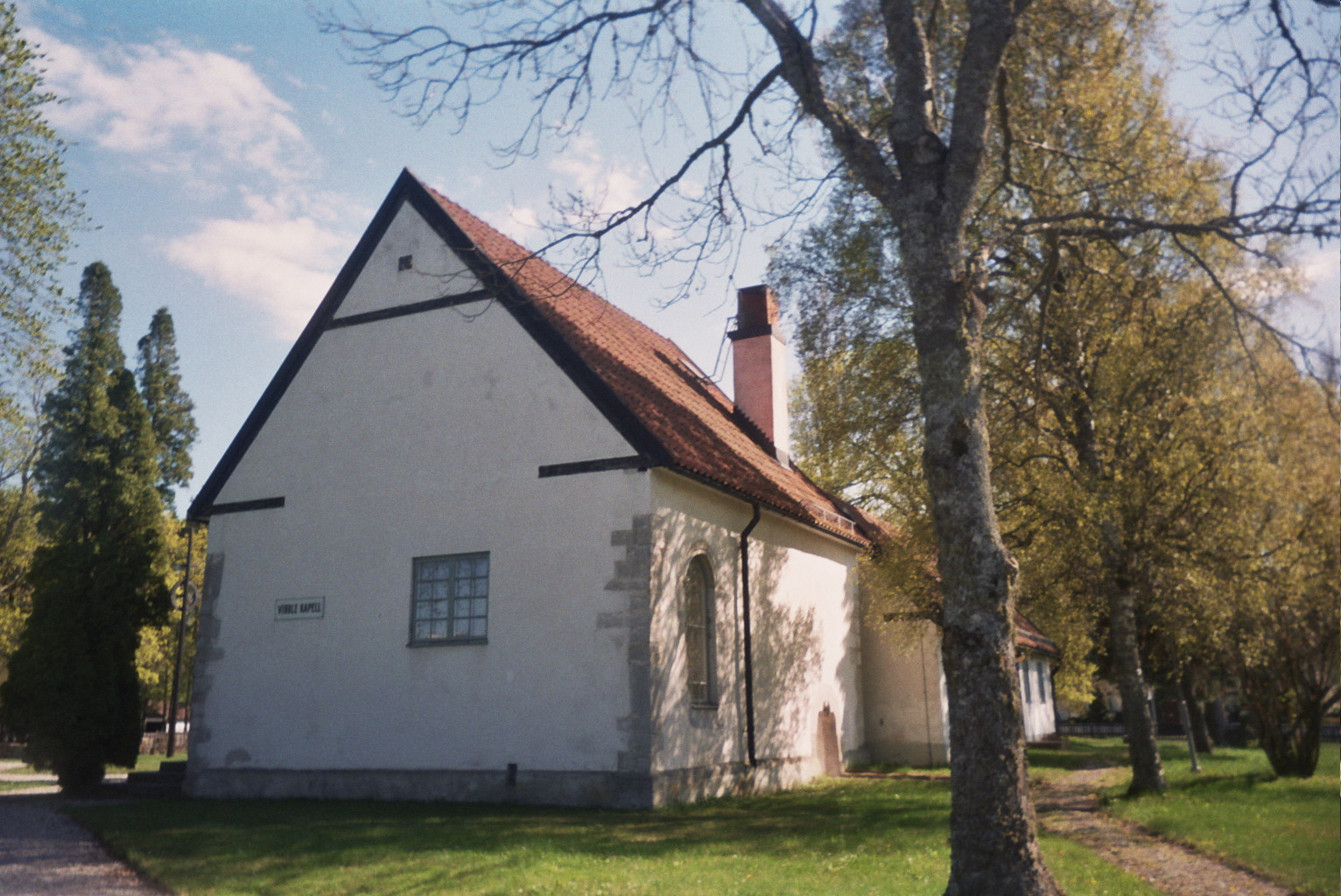
Vibble Chapel

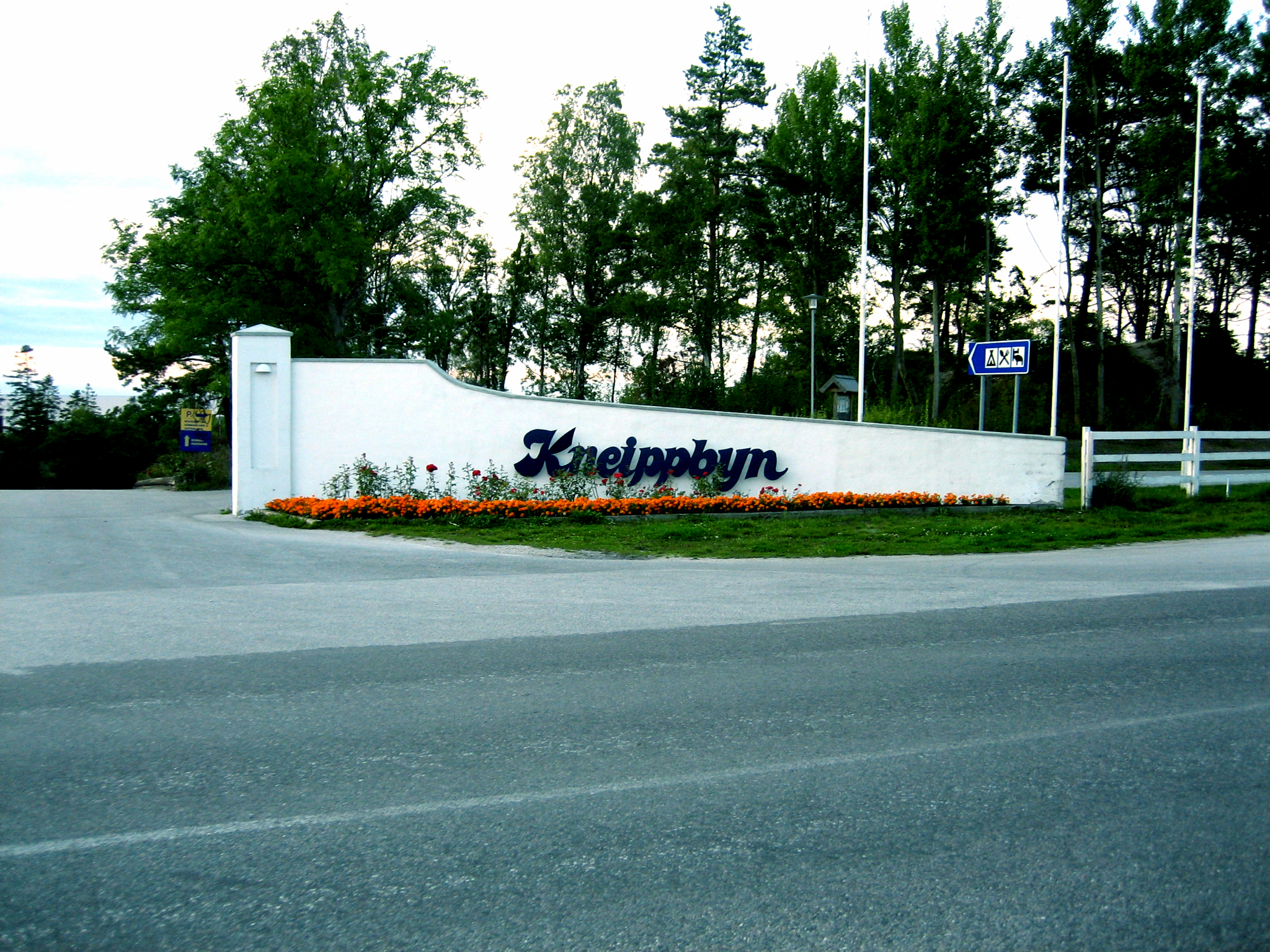
Kneippbyn Holiday Resort
