= Gotland sheep =

Breed of sheep

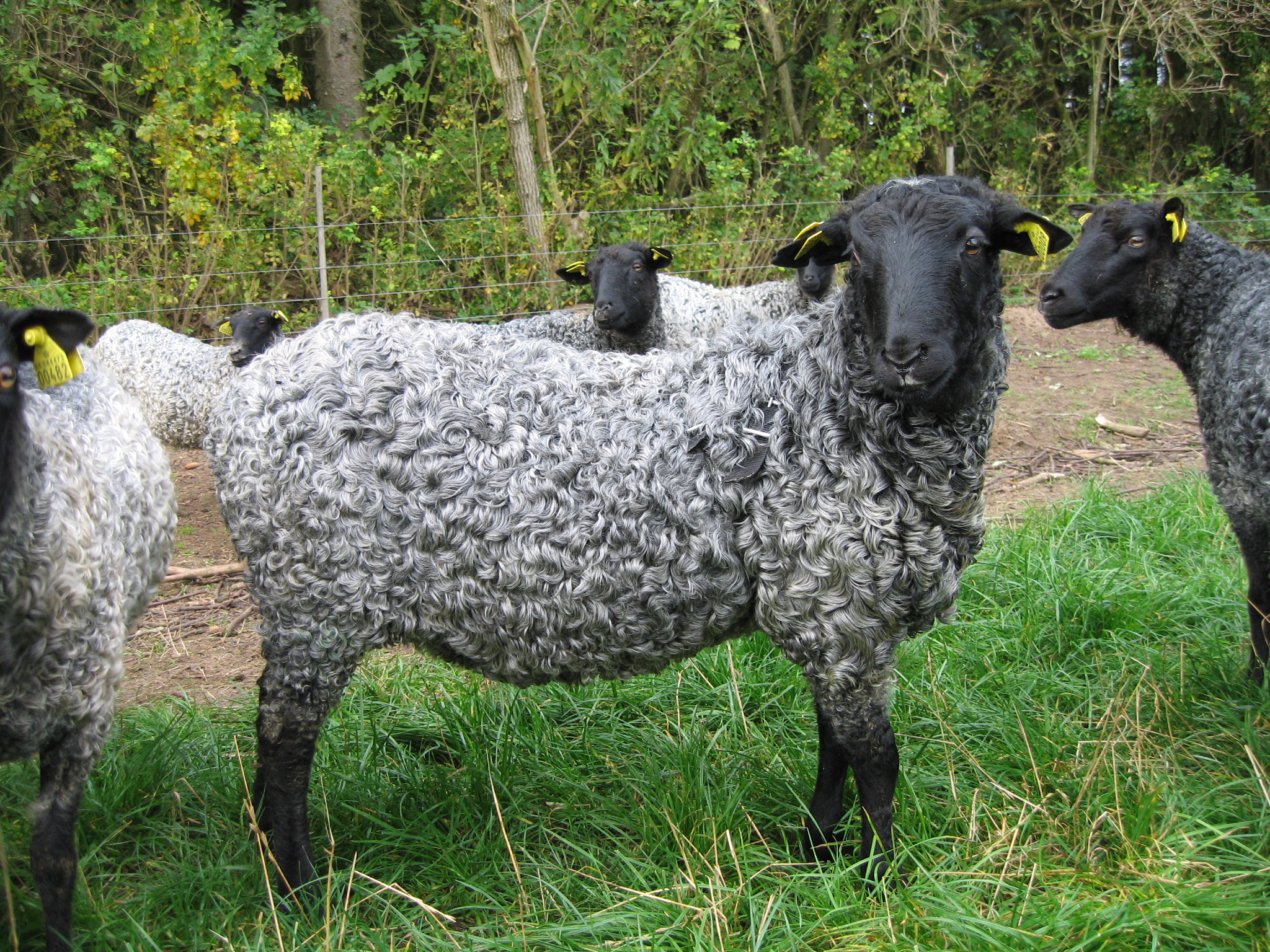
Gotland sheep in Denmark.

The Gotland, also called the Gotland Pelt (Swedish: Pälsfår), is a breed of domestic sheep named for the Swedish island of Gotland. A breed of Northern European short-tailed sheep, they are thought to be the product of crossbreeding between the native landrace of the island — called the Gute — with Karakuls and Romanovs during the 1920s and 1930s.

Primitive horned Gute sheep still exist on the island of Gotland today, though they are now rare. The main differences between the original Gute and the improved Gotlands are that the latter are entirely polled and have more uniform confirmation and fleeces. The improved Gotland sheep may be found in Sweden, Great Britain, Denmark, the Netherlands, New Zealand and Australia. Through the use of artificial insemination starting in 2003, Gotland sheep are being established in the United States of America through two breed associations: the American Gotland Sheep Society and the Gotland Sheep Breeders Association of North America. They are used for both their fleece and meat.

== Breed characteristics ==
Gotland sheep are fine-boned and of medium size. Gotlands are polled and have no wool on their black heads and legs. Sometimes there may be white markings on the top of the head or around the nose and mouth. They have alert medium-sized ears that stand outwards with a small neat muzzle, an even jaw and even teeth. Their slender neck and shoulders set smoothly into a level back with good depth and reasonable breadth of body. The slender legs are well spaced and upright. The tail is short with a hair-covered tip. The fleece is fine, long, lustrous and dense and can be all shades of grey from silver to charcoal grey and dark enough to be almost black. They have a clearly defined even curl (purl) and staple that is soft to the touch. Their disposition is docile and friendly, although older rams can become aggressive. The fleece is typically 29 to 34 micrometres in diameter. Lambswool can be in the low to mid 20s micrometre range. The fleece is prized in the United States by hand-spinners and in Europe they are most desired for their pelts.
