= Region Gotland =

Region Gotland Gotlands Kommun (Swedish)
- Municipality and Region
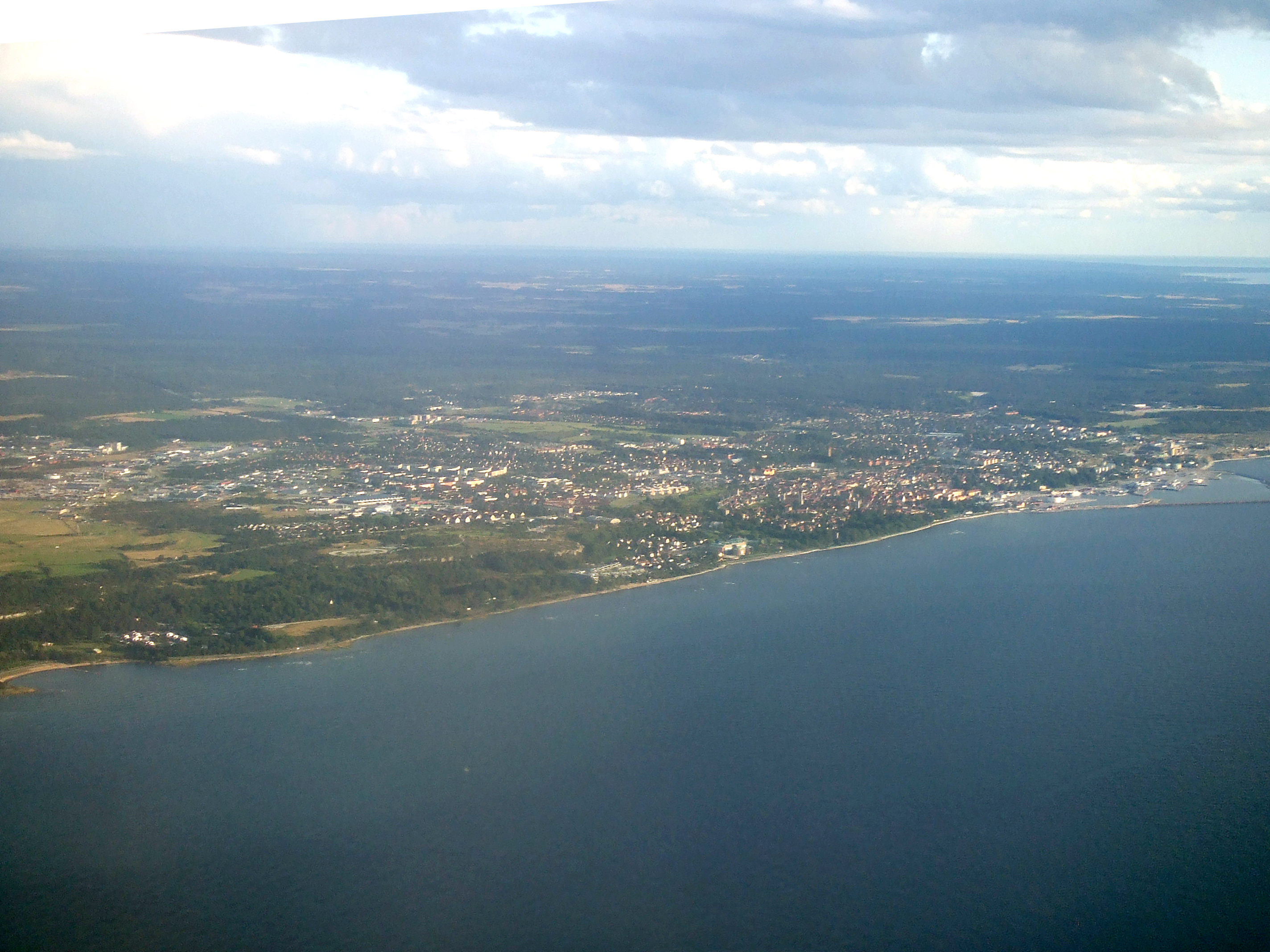

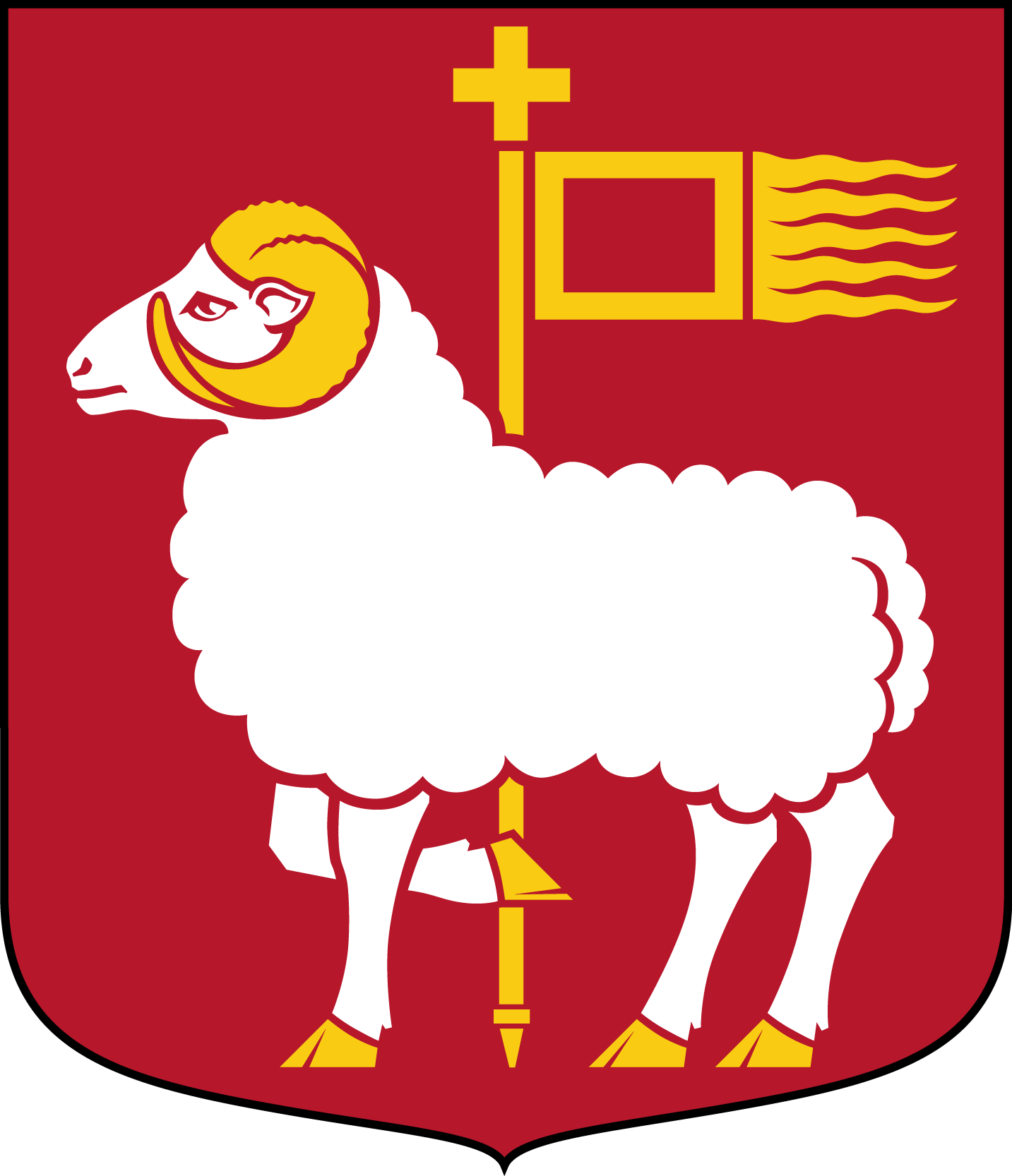
- Flag Coat of arms Logo

- Region Gotland
- Coordinates: 57°38′N 18°17′E
- Country: Sweden
- National Area: Småland and the islands
- County: Gotland County
- Seat: Visby

Area
  - Total: 15,241.07 km^{2} (5,884.61 sq mi)
  - Land: 3,134.05 km^{2} (1,210.06 sq mi)
  - Water: 12,107.02 km^{2} (4,674.55 sq mi)
- Area as of 1 January 2014.

Population (30 June 2025)
  - Total: 60,926
  - Density: 18.9/km^{2} (49/sq mi)
- Time zone: UTC+1 (CET)
  - Summer (DST): UTC+2 (CEST)
- ISO 3166 code: SE
- Province: Gotland
- Municipal code: 0980
- Website: www.gotland.se

Region Gotland, legally Gotlands kommun (English: Gotland Municipality), is a municipality with regional responsibilities that covers the entire island of Gotland in Sweden. The city of Visby is the municipality's seat. Gotland Municipality is the 39th most populous municipality in Sweden.

The flag of the municipality is a white ram on a red background.

== History ==
On 31 December 1951 there were 93 local government units on the island of Gotland, among them one city (Visby), one market town (Slite), one county council and a lot of rural municipalities, many of them with fewer than 100 inhabitants.

Twenty years later the situation was totally different.

The first of the two nationwide local government reforms in Sweden during the 20th century was implemented on 1 January 1952. From that date on, the rural municipalities on the island were regrouped into twelve new enlarged municipalities, which together with Visby, Slite and the Gotland County Council formed the new administrative pattern.

After ten years it was clear that this reform had not been radical enough and the work began preparing for the next one.

On 1 January 1971 the second and last local government reform was implemented in Sweden. All administrative and judicial differences between rural and urban areas were abolished. Only one type of municipality (kommun) existed from that date on. In the case of Gotland all the former entities were united into one single unit. As there was only one municipality in the county, also the County Council was abolished and merged into the new unitary municipality.

As the municipality is the only one in Sweden with both local and regional functions, normally provided separately by the Municipalities and Regional councils respectively, Gotland has a special status as a municipality and has officially been named Region Gotland as of 2011.

== Localities ==
There are 16 urban areas (also called a Tätort or locality) in Gotland Municipality.

In the table the localities are listed according to the size of the population. The municipal seat is in bold characters.

#	Locality	Population in 2005	Population in 2012
1	**Visby**	22,236	23,576
2	Hemse	1,836	1,734
3	Slite	1,598	1,500
4	Klintehamn	1,407	1,350
5	Vibble	1,135	1,300
6	Romakloster	905	949
7	Fårösund	862	800
8	Lärbro	521	500
9	Burgsvik	347	350
10	Stånga	342	300
11	Havdhem	318	300
12	Västerhejde	302	n a
13	Tingstäde	278	n a
14	Väskinde	275	250
15	Roma kyrkby	253	n a
16	När	209	n a

== Demographics ==
This is a demographic table based on Gotland Municipality's electoral districts in the 2022 Swedish general election sourced from SVT's election platform, in turn taken from SCB official statistics.

In total there were 60,941 residents, including 48,274 Swedish citizens of voting age. 59.2 % voted for the left coalition and 39.3 % for the right coalition. Indicators are in percentage points except population totals and income.

Location	Residents	Citizen adults	Left vote	Right vote	Employed	Swedish parents	Foreign heritage	Income SEK	Degree
Location			%	%					
Burgsvik	902	818	64.5	34.8	77	93	7	20,907	20
Dalhem	1,292	988	51.4	46.9	86	95	5	26,008	39
Eksta	1,343	1,085	54.3	43.5	79	94	6	21,860	32
Endre	1,378	1,045	54.6	44.5	86	93	7	26,718	34
Eskelhem	1,770	1,429	53.2	45.9	85	93	7	24,823	42
Fårö	507	452	58.5	39.4	79	95	5	20,165	34
Fårösund	1,262	1,029	58.1	39.6	73	88	12	20,146	34
Garde	1,331	1,115	58.1	41.1	82	95	5	21,928	32
Havdhem	1,115	950	62.3	36.1	80	94	6	20,185	30
Hemse/Alva	1,343	1,071	61.6	35.8	67	85	15	17,893	25
Hemse/Rone	1,213	984	56.0	42.4	79	92	8	20,248	28
Klinte	1,673	1,274	60.4	36.9	76	87	13	20,145	29
Kräklingbo	950	818	69.4	29.1	80	93	7	20,817	40
Lärbro	1,400	1,118	52.5	46.3	81	93	7	22,457	26
Roma	1,536	1,162	55.9	42.0	84	92	8	23,351	27
Sanda	1,528	1,180	57.0	41.2	88	95	5	24,339	38
Slite Othem/Boge	1,193	978	57.1	40.5	70	87	13	20,149	21
Slite Othem/Hellvi	982	810	51.0	47.4	83	91	9	23,849	25
Stenkumla	1,340	1,039	54.6	44.3	88	94	6	26,018	37
Stånga	1,494	1,238	59.3	38.7	86	95	5	22,320	31
Tingstäde	1,749	1,398	58.0	40.2	85	94	6	25,284	39
Vallstena	1,398	1,081	54.2	44.8	88	93	7	25,624	33
Visby A7/Östra Vi	2,382	1,874	61.3	37.8	80	90	10	25,127	49
Visby Bingeby	1,852	1,365	64.9	32.0	71	78	22	20,400	30
Visby Djuplunda	1,891	1,422	62.6	36.3	85	91	9	27,264	47
Visby Furulund	1,912	1,421	60.0	37.3	76	82	18	21,389	30
Visby Galgberget	1,653	1,360	57.2	41.7	81	90	10	28,402	55
Visby Innerstaden	1,748	1,337	66.2	32.9	77	87	13	28,464	67
Visby Länna	2,048	1,660	65.0	33.9	81	90	10	25,885	51
Visby Norr	1,363	1,108	65.7	32.5	69	85	15	19,685	36
Visby Pilhagen	1,410	1,202	65.3	33.6	81	93	7	22,440	35
Visby Skarphäll	1,813	1,541	62.8	35.9	84	93	7	25,668	42
Visby Söder	1,442	1,134	58.5	40.4	66	83	17	21,564	57
Visby Terra Nova	1,872	1,398	59.2	39.6	80	92	8	26,962	34
Visby Visborg	1,665	1,398	62.1	36.8	78	90	10	23,131	46
Visby Y Furulund	1,448	1,112	65.6	32.0	71	81	19	19,127	23
Visby Öster	1,543	1,195	61.1	37.4	72	86	14	23,933	55
Vänge	1,167	940	54.8	43.9	86	93	7	23,742	29
Väskinde	2,320	1,779	57.4	41.5	85	94	6	26,390	39
Västerhejde	2,713	1,966	56.2	42.9	85	92	8	28,459	45
Source: SVT

== Politics ==
=== Riksdag ===
These are the results of the elections to the Riksdag held in Gotland since 1973. The results only include parties that have won representation in the Riksdag assembly at least once during this timeframe. The results of the Sweden Democrats were not listed at a municipal level by the SCB between 1988 and 1998 due to the party's small size at the time. The respective coalitions are based on which prime minister the party backed at the back end of each governance period.

Year	Turnout	Votes	V	S	MP	C	L	KD	M	SD	NyD	Left	Right
1973	90.2	34,168	1.8	37.2	0.0	39.6	7.3	1.0	12.7			39.0	59.6
1976	90.7	36,105	2.6	37.7	0.0	37.3	8.3	0.6	13.4			40.3	59.0
1979	90.0	36,585	4.2	38.7	0.0	31.3	8.7	0.6	16.1			42.9	56.1
1982	90.6	37,646	3.7	42.1	2.3	27.3	5.1	1.0	18.3			45.8	50.7
1985	88.9	37,766	3.7	41.8	2.5	24.4	10.4		17.0			45.5	51.8
1988	85.8	36,362	4.1	41.0	6.8	25.0	7.9	1.5	13.4			51.9	46.3
1991	85.9	36,458	3.8	36.2	4.3	20.7	6.6	5.0	16.7		6.4	40.0	49.0
1994	86.1	37,009	5.2	43.5	6.7	17.9	4.5	2.5	18.0		1.3	55.4	40.4
1998	79.8	34,201	10.8	34.8	5.7	15.0	3.4	8.7	19.2			51.3	46.3
2002	79.0	34,376	8.4	40.8	5.5	15.6	7.8	6.5	14.0	0.6		54.7	43.9
2006	81.4	35,750	6.0	34.9	6.3	19.3	4.4	3.8	21.6	1.6		47.2	49.1
2010	84,9	38,640	6.1	33.3	8.4	14.6	4.6	2.9	25.2	3.2		47.8	47.3
2014	86.5	39,655	5.8	32.2	7.2	13.4	3.8	2.8	21.3	8.2		45.2	41.3
2018	88.8	41,129	9.0	29.8	5.0	17.2	3.7	4.1	16.6	12.7		61.0	37.2
2022	87.1	41,459	6.4	34.6	6.5	11.7	2.8	4.0	16.8	15.7		59.2	39.3

=== Local ===
Election results:

Party	Seats in the 2002 election	Seats in the 2006 election	Seats in the 2010 election	Seats in the 2014 election	Seats in the 2018 election
Swedish Social Democratic Party	28	24	24	21	18
Centre Party	13	17	15	14	18
Moderate Party	11	14	15	13	11
Left Party	8	7	6	7	7
Liberal People's Party	4	4	4	4	3
Green Party	4	4	7	8	4
Christian Democrats	3	1	0	0	2
Sweden Democrats	0	0	0	3	6
Feminist Initiative	0	0	0	1	2
Total	71	71	71	71	71

== Region ==
When Gotland was made into a single municipality in the 1970s, the county council was abolished and its responsibilities transferred to the municipality, making it a unitary authority. During a trial period some of the authority normally held by the Gotland County Administrative Board, an agency of the national government, has also been devolved to the Gotland Municipality, as well as to two mainland councils. The municipality of Gotland is therefore in this respect also a region. It has responsibility for the public healthcare system and public transport.

== Events organised by the municipality ==
The municipality coordinates the annual Almedalen Week (Almedalsveckan), an important meetingplace for everyone involved in Swedish politics. During the week, representatives from the political parties in the Riksdag take turns to hold speeches in the Almedalen park in Visby.

== See also ==
- Politics of Sweden
- Elections in Sweden
- List of Gotland Governors
