= Gute sheep =

Breed of sheep

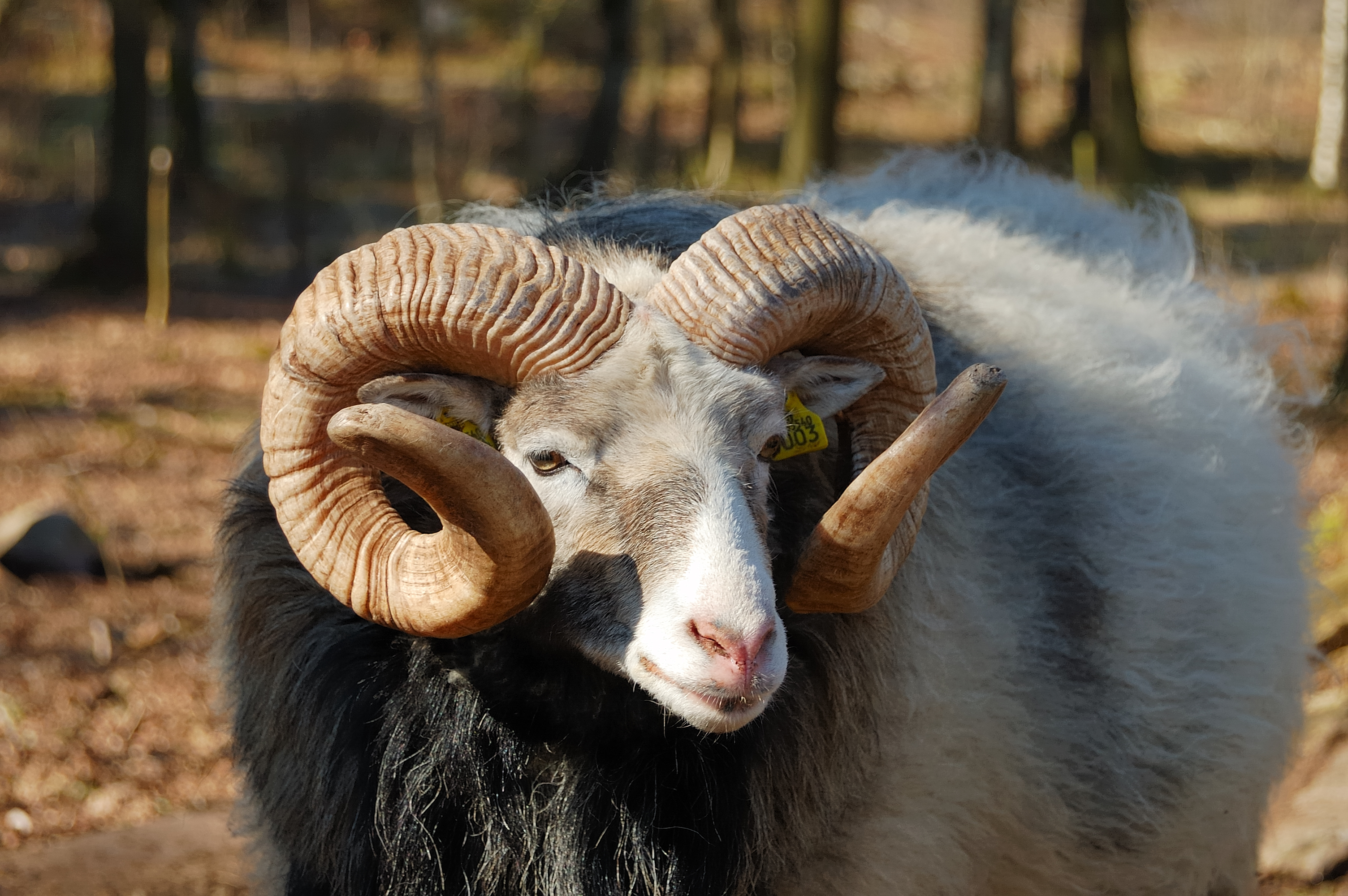
A Gute ram

The Gute (Swedish: Gutefår) is a landrace-based breed of domestic sheep native to the Swedish island of Gotland. The Gute is the most primitive breed native to Sweden, and is one of the Northern European short-tailed sheep. The modern Gotland (Swedish: Gotlandsfår) breed is its direct descendant. Unlike the Gotland, the Gute is horned in both rams and ewes, and has a fleece that appears in a wider variety of colors and patterns, which may be shed in the summer. This breed is raised primarily for genetic conservation.

== Color ==
The most common color of Gute are grey. The ones that are dark grey have black heads and legs. Light grey Gute have white and tan hair on their legs and head. Grey and Black sheep typically have light hair around the eyes and face. The white sheep are seldom all white. White sheep usually have tan patches on the neck and other parts of the body. Most all non-white sheep have markings that are white. The markings can vary greatly.

== Size ==
=== Weight ===
- ram: 70–100 kg
- ewe: 45–60 kg

=== Height ===
- ram: 64–84 cm
- ewe: 65–71 cm

=== Horn length ===
- ram: 39–90 cm
- ewe: 21–43 cm

=== Horn circumference at base ===
- ram: 20–29 cm
- ewe: 12–14 cm

=== Tail length ===
- rams: 13–17 cm
- ewe: 13–17 cm
