= Gotland County =

County (län) of Sweden

Gotland County Gotlands län (Swedish)
- County
- Flag Coat of arms

- Gotland County in Sweden

- Location map of Gotland County in Sweden
- Coordinates: 57°29′57″N 18°30′34″E
- Country: Sweden
- Founded: 1658
- Capital: Visby

Government
  - Governor: Charlotte Petri Gornitzka
  - Municipality: Region Gotland

Area
  - Total: 3,151.4 km^{2} (1,216.8 sq mi)

Population (31 December 2023)
  - Total: 61,029
  - Density: 19.366/km^{2} (50.157/sq mi)

GDP
  - Total: SEK 19 billion €2.011 billion (2015)
- Time zone: UTC+1 (CET)
  - Summer (DST): UTC+2 (CEST)
- ISO 3166 code: SE-I
- NUTS Region: SE214
- Website: www.i.lst.se

Gotland County (Swedish: Gotlands län, pronounced [ˈɡɔtːlands lɛːn]) is a county or län of Sweden. Gotland is located in the Baltic Sea to the east of Öland, and is the largest of Sweden's islands. Counties are usually sub-divided into municipalities, but Gotland County consists of only one county council, which also serves as a municipality, Region Gotland. Gotland County is the only county in Sweden that is not governed by a municipal council. The municipality handles the tasks that are otherwise handled by the county council: mainly health care and public transport. Like other counties, Gotland has a County Administrative Board, which oversees implementation of the Swedish state government. Both the County Administrative Board and the municipality have their seat in the largest city, Visby, with over 22,000 inhabitants. Princess Leonore, the daughter of Princess Madeleine, is Duchess of Gotland.

== Province ==
The provinces of Sweden are no longer officially administrative units but are used in reporting population size, politics, etc. In that case, the province, the county and the municipality all have identical borders and cover an area of 3151 km^{2}

== Administration ==
Gotland is the only Swedish county that is not administered by a county council. Instead, the municipality is tasked with the responsibilities of a county, including public health care and public transport.

The main aims of the County Administrative Board are to fulfil the goals set in national politics by the Riksdag and the Government, to coordinate the interests and promote the development of the county, to establish regional goals and safeguard the due process of law in the handling of each case. The County Administrative Board is a Government agency headed by a Governor.

Jennie von Alten is the regional police chief for Gotland County.

== Politics ==
During a trial period the County Council provisions for Gotland has been evolved to provisions for a Regional Council, meaning that it has assumed certain tasks from the County Administrative Board. Similar provisions are applicable to the counties of Västra Götaland and Skåne during the trial period.

== Localities in order of size ==
The five most populous localities of Gotland County in 2010:

#	Locality	Population
1	Visby	22,593
2	Hemse	1,715
3	Slite	1,483
4	Klintehamn	1,363
5	Vibble	1,286

=== Foreign background ===
Statistics Sweden have collected statistics on backgrounds of residents since 2002. These tables consist of all who have two foreign-born parents or are born abroad themselves. The chart lists election years and the last year on record alone.

Location	2002	2006	2010	2014	2018	2019
Gotland	4.8	5.2	5.8	6.4	8.8	9.2
Source: SCB

== Heraldry ==
Gotland County inherited its coat of arms from the province of Gotland. When it is shown with a royal crown it represents the County Administrative Board.
