= History of the Basques =

The Basques are an indigenous ethno-linguistic group primarily inhabiting the Basque Country, a region that spans northeastern Spain and southwestern France. While geographically located in the Iberian Peninsula, Basques are often distinguished from other Iberian populations due to their unique language, culture, and genetic profile. Linguistically, Basque is a language isolate with no known relation to ancient Iberian or Indo-European languages, and is believed to be a descendant of the pre-Indo-European tongues once spoken across Western Europe. Genetically and culturally, Basques are more closely linked to the ancient Aquitani people of what is now southwestern France. Although the northern Aquitani have largely assimilated into French identity, their southern counterparts persisted culturally and linguistically as the Basques. As such, the Basques are considered a distinct non-Indo-European population indigenous to Western Europe, with deep historical roots predating modern national borders.

== Origins ==
The Hand of Irulegi, a 2,200-year-old (1st century BC) bronze hand silhouette, was discovered in 2021 on a hillside near Lakidain, Navarre. It bears the oldest known Basque-related inscription, including the word "SORIONEKU" (modern Basque zorioneko, meaning "blessed" or "fortunate"). This find pushes back the documented presence of the Basque language in the region to the Iron Age.

The Basque people descend from the Aquitani, an ancient people of southwestern Gaul whose language is considered an early form of Basque. The tribes historically inhabiting the Basque territory—Vascones, Caristii, Varduli, and Autrigones—are linked with either the Vascones or Aquitani, rather than Iberians or Celts.

Archaeological evidence from sites such as Santimamiñe indicates human occupation dating back to the Aurignacian period (~40,000 years ago), with signs of cultural continuity into the Iron Age. Linguistic analysis of Basque vocabulary, such as aizkora ("axe"), suggests roots tracing back to the Paleolithic.

=== Genetic evidence ===
Basques exhibit a unique genetic profile characterized by:

A high frequency of the Y-chromosome haplogroup R1b-DF27, shared with but more concentrated than in neighboring populations.

The highest rate worldwide of Rh-negative blood type, indicating genetic isolation.

Autosomal DNA analysis found Basques to be direct descendants of prehistoric Western Europeans. A 2015 study analyzed DNA from Neolithic individuals in Atapuerca, showing that Basques descend from early Iberian farmers who were genetically isolated for millennia.

== Basque Country in prehistoric times ==
=== Paleolithic ===
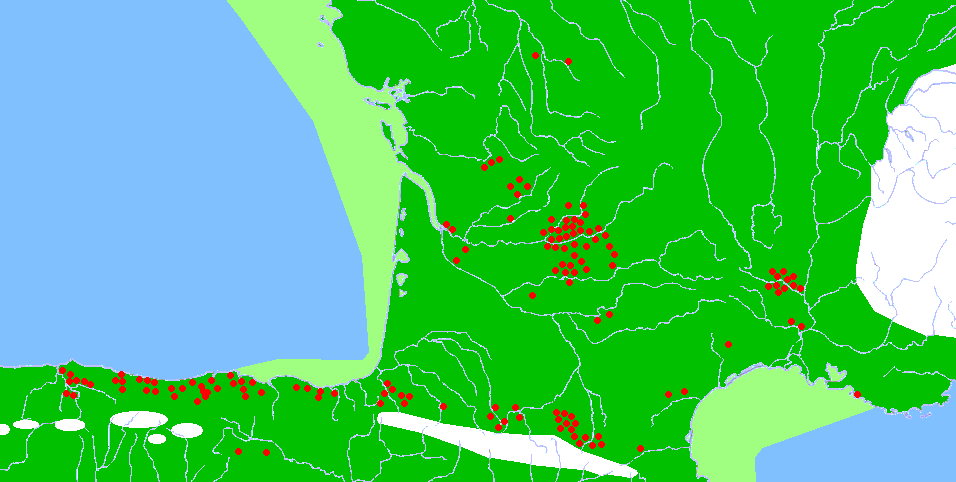
Map of the Franco-Cantabrian region, showing the main caves with mural art

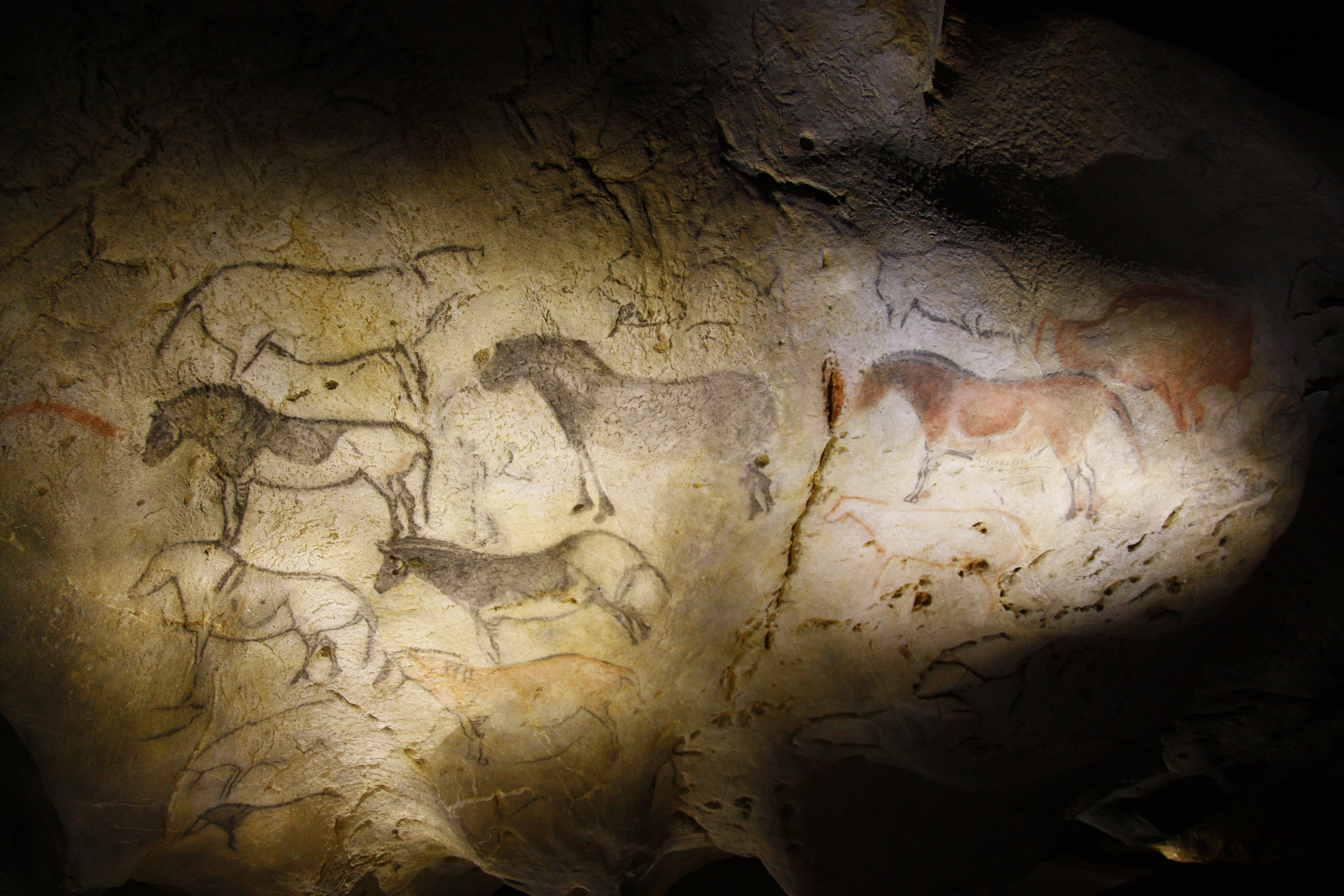
Horse paintings on the walls of the cave Ekain (Ekainberri), near Azpeitia

About 35,000 years ago, the lands that are now the Basque Country, together with neighbouring areas such as Aquitaine and the Pyrenees, were settled by Cro-Magnons, who gradually displaced the region's earlier Neanderthal population. The settlers brought the Aurignacian culture with them.

At this stage, the Basque Country formed part of the archaeological Franco-Cantabrian province which extended all the way from Asturias to Provence. Throughout this region, which underwent similar cultural developments with some local variation, the Aurignacian culture was successively replaced by the Gravettian, Solutrean, and Magdalenian cultures. Except for the Aurignacian, these all seem to have originated in the Franco-Cantabrian region, which suggests no further waves of immigration into the area during the Paleolithic period.

Within the present-day Basque Country, settlement was limited almost exclusively to the Atlantic area, probably for climatic reasons. Important Basque sites include the following:

- Santimamiñe (Biscay): Gravettian, Solutrean and Magdalenian remains, mural art
- Bolinkoba (Biscay): Gravettian and Solutrean
- Ermitia (Gipuzkoa): Solutrean and Magdalenian
- Amalda (Gipuzkoa): Gravettian and Solutrean
- Koskobilo (Gipuzkoa): Aurignacian and Solutrean
- Aitzbitarte (Gipuzkoa): Aurignacian, Gravettian, Solutrean and Magdalenian
- Isturitz (Lower Navarre): Gravettian, Solutrean and Magdalenian, mural art
- Gatzarria (Soule): Aurignacian and Gravettian

=== Epipaleolithic and Neolithic ===
At the end of the Ice Age, Magdalenian culture gave way to Azilian culture. Hunters turned from large animals to smaller prey, and fishing and seafood gathering became important economic activities. The southern part of the Basque Country was first settled in this period.

Gradually, Neolithic technology started to filter through from the Mediterranean coasts, first in the form of isolated pottery items (Zatoia, Marizulo) and later with the introduction of sheepherding. As in most of Atlantic Europe, this transition progressed slowly.

In the Ebro valley, more fully Neolithic sites are found. Anthropometric classification of the remains suggests the possibility of some Mediterranean colonisation here. A comparable situation is found in Aquitaine, where settlers may have arrived via the Garonne.

In the second half of the 4th millennium BC, Megalithic culture appeared throughout the area. Burials become collective (possibly implying families or clans) and the dolmen predominates, while caves are also employed in some places. Unlike the dolmens of the Mediterranean basin which show a preference for corridors, in the Atlantic area they are invariably simple chambers.

=== Copper and Bronze Ages ===
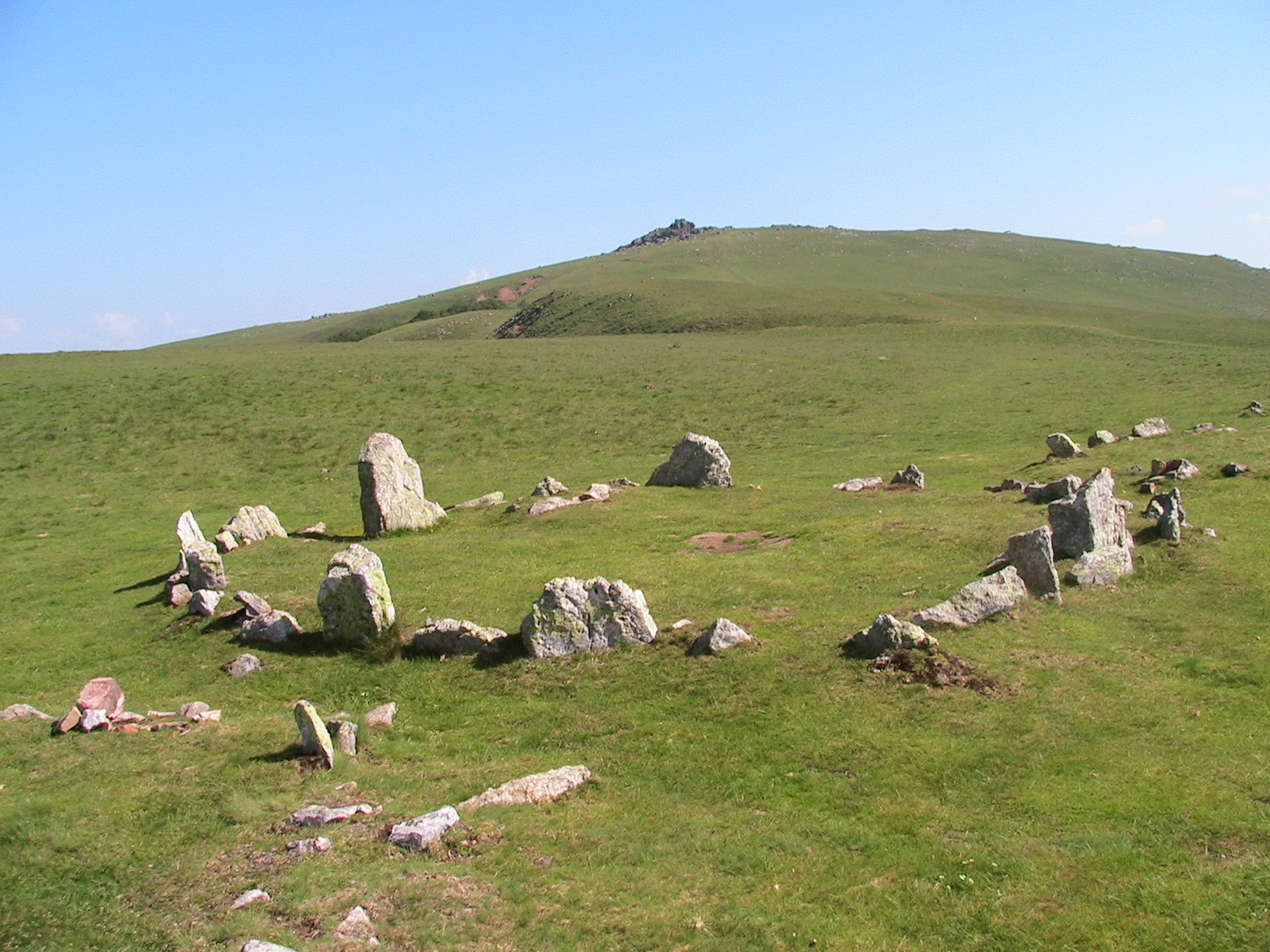
Cromlech of Okabe (Lower Navarre)

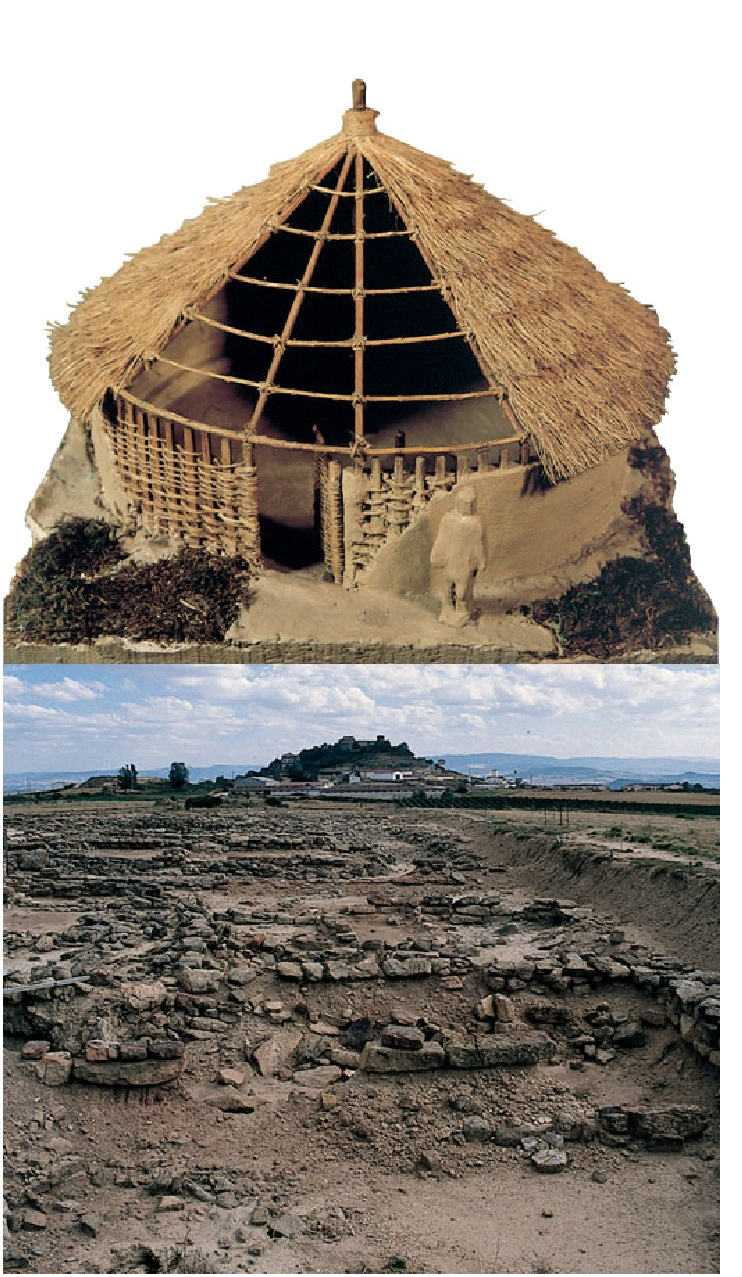
Typical round shack and settlement of La Hoya on the Ebro banks (Álava)

Use of copper and gold, and then other metals, did not begin in the Basque Country until c. 2500 BCE. With the arrival of metal working, the first urban settlements made their appearance. One of the most notable towns on account of its size and continuity was La Hoya in southern Álava, which may have served as a link, and possibly a trading centre, between Portugal (Vila Nova de São Pedro culture) and Languedoc (Treilles group). Concurrently, caves and natural shelters remained in use, particularly in the Atlantic region.

Undecorated pottery continued from the Neolithic period up until the arrival of the Bell Beaker culture with its characteristic pottery style, which is mainly found around the Ebro Valley. Building of megalithic structures continued until the Late Bronze Age.

In Aquitaine, there was a notable presence of the Artenacian culture, a culture of bowmen that spread rapidly through Western France and Belgium from its homeland near the Garonne c. 2400 BCE.

In the Late Bronze Age, parts of the southern Basque Country came under the influence of the pastoralist Cogotas I culture of the Iberian plateau.

=== Iron Age ===
In the Iron Age, bearers of the late Urnfield culture followed the Ebro upstream as far as the southern fringes of the Basque Country, leading to the incorporation of the Hallstatt culture; this corresponds to the beginning of Indo-European, notably Celtic influence in the region.

In the Basque Country, settlements now appear mainly at points of difficult access, probably for defensive reasons, and had elaborate defense systems. During this phase, agriculture seemingly became more important than animal husbandry.

It may be during this period that new megalithic structures, the (stone circle) or cromlech and the megalith or menhir, made their appearance.

== Roman rule ==
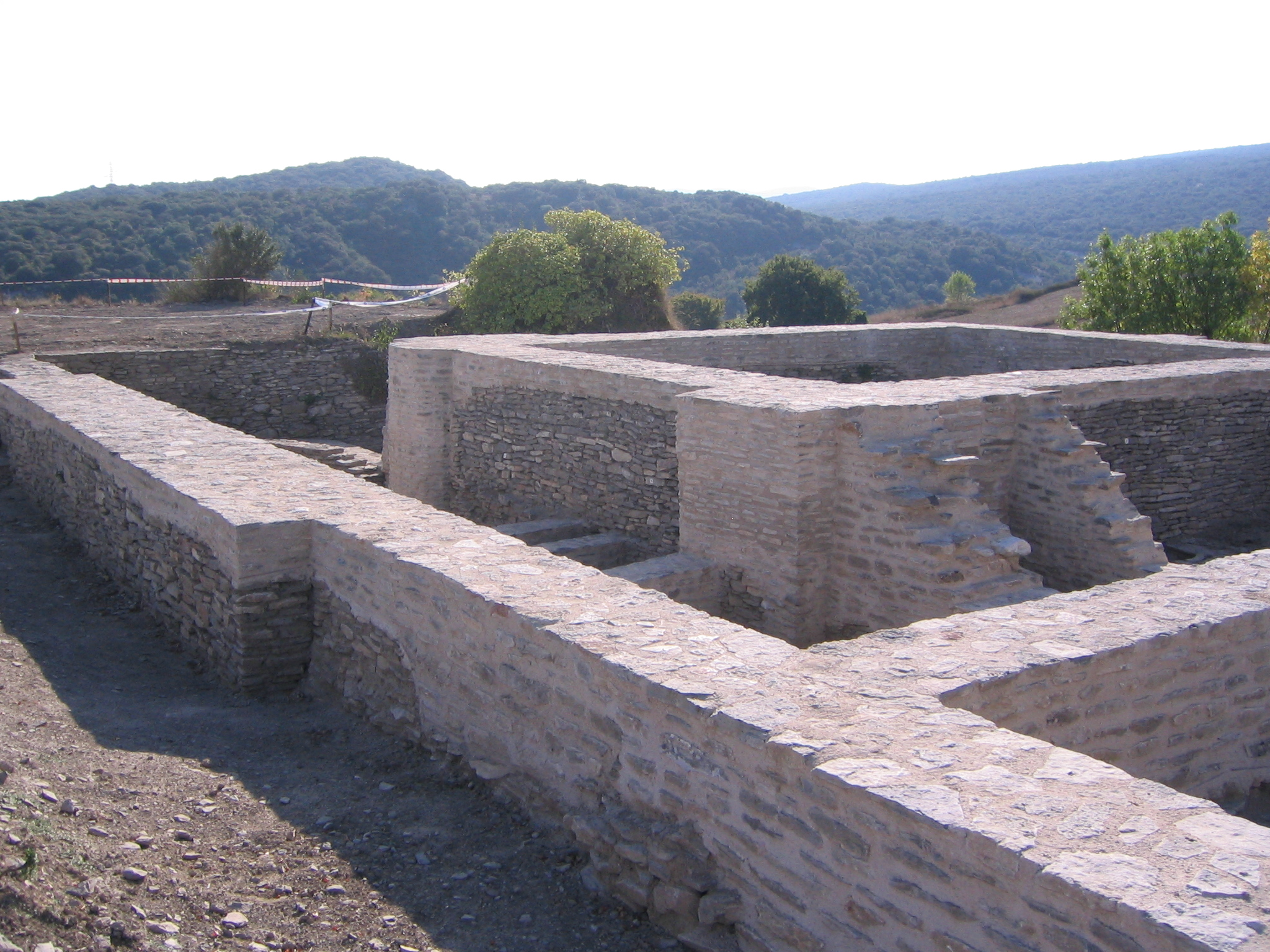
Reconstruction at the archaeological site of Iruña-Veleia, in central Álava

When the Romans arrived in what is now southwestern France, the Pyrenees, and the region extending to Cantabria, the territory was inhabited by various tribes, most of which were non-Indo-European (though the nature of some, such as the Caristii, remains unclear). The Vascones are the tribe most closely identified with the modern Basques, but evidence indicates that Basque-like peoples lived around the Pyrenees and as far as the Garonne River. This is supported by Julius Caesar's account in De Bello Gallico, inscriptions in the Aquitanian language (including personal and divine names), and numerous place names.

Most Aquitanian tribes were subdued in 65 BC by Marcus Licinius Crassus, Caesar's lieutenant. However, the Romans had already reached the upper Ebro region, bordering the Basque territory, in the early 2nd century BC, with settlements such as Calagurris and Graccurris. Under Pompey, in the 1st century BC, the Romans founded Pompaelo (modern-day Pamplona, Iruñea in Basque), although Roman rule was not fully consolidated until the reign of Emperor Augustus. The relative leniency of Roman administration allowed the Basques to retain their traditional laws and local leadership. Romanization was limited in the Basque lands closer to the Atlantic, whereas it was more intense in the Mediterranean Basin. The persistence of the Basque language is often attributed to this limited Roman development.

Pompaelo served as a significant Roman military garrison south of the Pyrenees. Westward expansion followed with the Roman campaigns against the Cantabri during the Cantabrian Wars. Archaeological remains reveal garrisons protecting commercial routes along the Ebro River and a Roman road connecting Asturica to Burdigala (modern Bordeaux).

A contingent of Varduli soldiers was stationed at Hadrian's Wall in northern Britain, earning the title fida ("faithful") for their service. The Romans frequently entered into alliances (foedera) with local tribes, granting them substantial autonomy within the empire.

Livy noted the distinction between the fertile Ager Vasconum (Ebro basin fields) and the mountainous Saltus Vasconum to the north. Historians have argued that Romanization was pronounced in the Ager but minimal in the Saltus, where Roman settlements were scarce and small. However, 21st-century research highlights the economic significance of fishing (with numerous caetariae, or fish-processing factories) and mining along the Atlantic coast, alongside settlements spread across the region.

The Bagaudae, groups of rural rebels in the late Roman Empire, had a major impact on Basque history. In the late 4th and 5th centuries, the Basque region from the Garonne to the Ebro largely escaped Roman control amid widespread revolts. Several Roman villas, such as those at Liédena and Ramalete, were destroyed by fire. The proliferation of coin mints in the region is interpreted as evidence for an internal limes (border zone) in Vasconia, where coins were minted to pay troops. After the collapse of Roman authority, conflict with Rome's Visigoth allies persisted.

== Middle Ages ==
=== Christianization ===
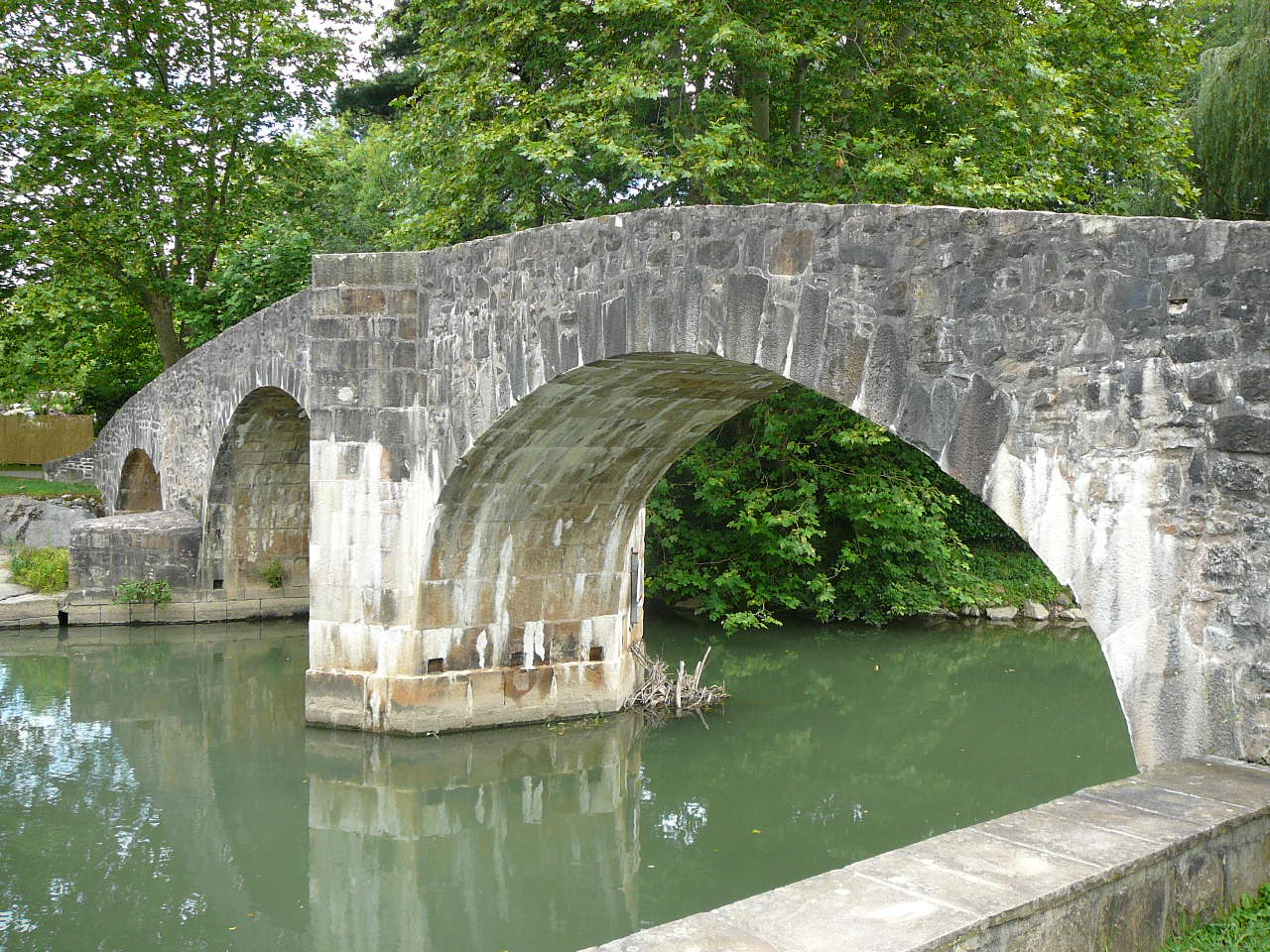
Roman bridge in Ascain (Azkaine)

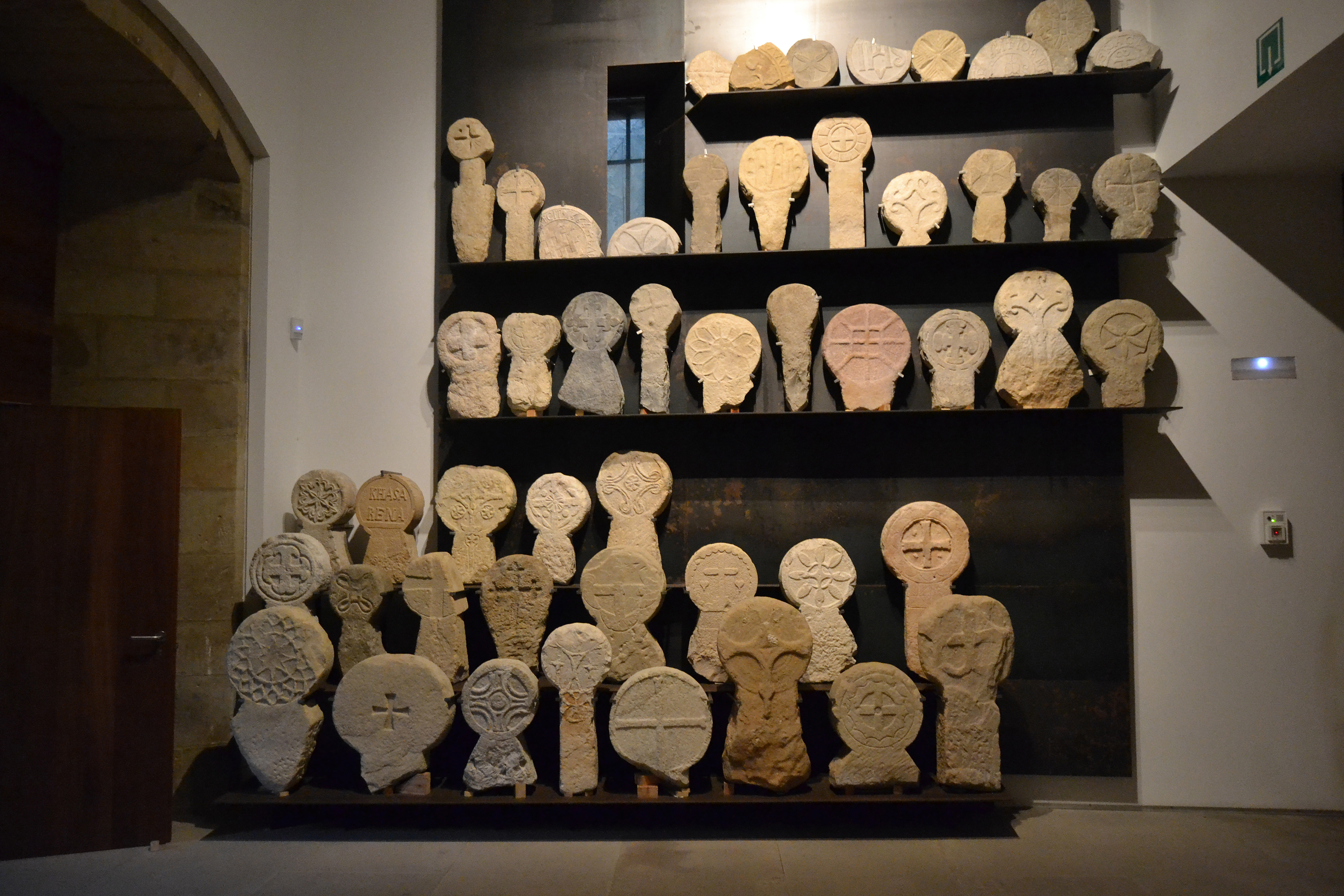
Medieval stellae collection exhibited at the San Telmo Museum, San Sebastián

Despite early Christian testimonies and institutional presence, Basque Christianization was slow. The Basques largely retained their pagan beliefs (later incorporated into Basque mythology), and were Christianized slowly, in a process comparable to the Germanic peoples who resisted Carolingian expansion in the 8th–9th centuries, such as the Saxons. The process extended roughly from the 4th to the 12th century, with some scholars arguing it lasted until the 15th century.

The Christian poet Prudentius praises the Vasconic town of Calahorra in his Peristephanon (early 5th century), referring to its "one-time pagan Vascones" and their martyrdom under Roman persecution (circa 305). Calahorra became an episcopal see in the 4th century, its bishop overseeing an extensive territory including parts of present-day central Rioja, Biscay, Álava, Gipuzkoa, and Navarre. By the 5th century, Eauze (Elusa) was also an episcopal see in Novempopulania, but the actual social influence of these centers remains unclear.

The collapse of Roman authority marked a turning point. Basques ceased to be associated with Roman civilization and its urban culture after the late 5th century, and paganism remained widespread among them at least until the late 7th century and the failed mission of Saint Amandus. However, Frankish chroniclers of the Battle of Roncevaux Pass (778) do not mention Basque paganism, despite its propaganda value; indeed, Odo of Aquitaine was recognized by the Pope as a Christian champion.

Charlemagne pursued colonization in Aquitaine and Vasconia after their submission in 768–769, enlisting the Church to reinforce Frankish authority. He restored control over the High Pyrenees in 778, dividing lands among bishops and abbots and initiating baptism efforts among the Basques in that region.

Muslim chroniclers from the period of the Umayyad conquest of Hispania and early 9th century describe the Basques as magi ("pagan wizards"), not as People of the Book (Christians). In 816, a Muslim source mentions a 'Saltan' near Pamplona—likely a distorted form of the Basque Zaldun ("knight"). Later Muslim historians criticize the Banu Qasi for alliances with these pagan Basque leaders.

Importantly, the Basques were never conquered by the Umayyads; instead, they maintained independence and occasionally allied with Muslim powers such as the Banu Qasi to resist Frankish or Cordovan domination.

== Early Middle Ages ==
In 409, the Vandals, Alans, and Suevi crossed the western Pyrenees into Hispania, followed by the Visigoths in 416 as allies of Rome, though the impact on Basque lands is uncertain. In 418, Rome granted Aquitania and Tarraconensis to the Visigoths as foederati, likely to defend Novempopulana from Bagaudae raids. Although some have speculated the Basques were part of the Bagaudae, contemporary chronicler Hydatius distinguishes the Vascones and the rebels.

The Visigoths claimed Basque lands early on but failed to fully subdue them. Between 435 and 450, Bagaudae rebellions and Visigothic campaigns occurred near Toulouse, Araceli, and Turiasum. The Suevi king Rechiar ravaged Vascon territories in 449–451, damaging settlements; Calahorra and Pamplona survived, but Iruña-Veleia was abandoned.

The Visigoths attempted further invasions post-456, likely crossing the Pyrenees at Roncesvalles, but events remain unclear due to sparse sources. Basques increasingly appeared as mountain warriors threatening urban centers.

The Franks displaced Visigoths from Aquitaine in 507, placing Basques between rival kingdoms. Around 581, both Franks and Visigoths attacked Vasconia but failed. A Frankish defeat in 587 implies Basque expansion north of the Pyrenees. However, Basque expansionism is debated and not essential to the region's history. Frankish and Gothic marches were established to contain Basques — the Duchy of Cantabria to the south and the Duchy of Vasconia to the north (602).

During the 6th–8th centuries, the Duchy of Vasconia spanned both sides of the Pyrenees. Cantabria (possibly including Biscay and Álava) and Pamplona remained independent from Visigothic rule, often aligned with the Franks.

Between 660 and 678, Duke Felix consolidated Vasconia, establishing a strong polity independent from Merovingian Frankish rule. This Basque-Aquitanian realm peaked under Odo the Great. The Umayyad conquest of Hispania (711) and rise of the Carolingians threatened this state, contributing to its fragmentation.

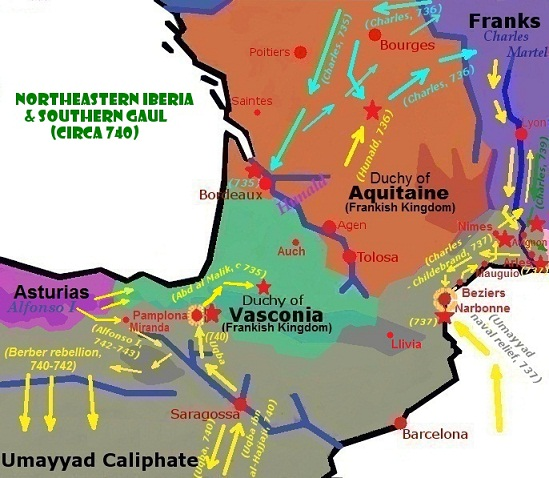
The Duchy of Vasconia and neighbouring territories (740)

After Odo's death in 735, Frankish attempts to subdue Vasconia continued, facing resistance led by Odo's descendants Hunald and Waifer. Frankish king Pippin ravaged the region in 762 but gained submission at the Garonne (c. 769). Vasconia was then described as stretching from Cantabria to the Loire, indicating Basque presence deep into Aquitaine.

The Basque uprisings hampered Charlemagne's interests, including his siege of Zaragoza. After demolishing Pamplona's walls, Roland's rear guard was defeated at the first Battle of Roncevaux Pass (778) by the Basques, led by Duke Lupus, suggesting broken allegiance. Charlemagne ceased appointing dukes in Vasconia after 781, opting for direct rule through the Kingdom of Aquitaine.

The Basque-Muslim Banu Qasi principality, founded c. 800 near Tudela, acted as a buffer between Basques and Cordovan Umayyads, aiding the establishment of the independent Kingdom of Pamplona after the second Battle of Roncevaux Pass (824). The Pamplonese and Banu Qasi defeated a Frankish expedition led by counts Eblus and Aznar. Álava emerged as a contested territory between Asturian and Cordovan forces.

Eneko Arista (Eneko Aritza), rose to power in Pamplona c. 824, establishing a dynasty that resisted Frankish control south of the western Pyrenees. The Arista and Banu Qasi dynasties ruled side by side until the early 10th century. With Sancho I Garces (r. 905), Pamplona aligned with other Christian realms, expanding southwards.

Viking raids in 844–859 targeted the region; they killed the Basque Duke Seguin II of Gascony and took Bayonne and Pamplona, even capturing King Garcia. Viking incursions ended in 982 under Duke William II Sanchez of Gascony, who secured the region and fostered monastic growth.

By the 10th century, Vasconia fragmented into feudal regions like Soule and Labourd, while south of the Pyrenees, the Kingdom of Castile, Kingdom of Pamplona, and Pyrenean counties such as Aragon, Sobrarbe, Ribagorza, and Pallars emerged.

== High Middle Ages ==
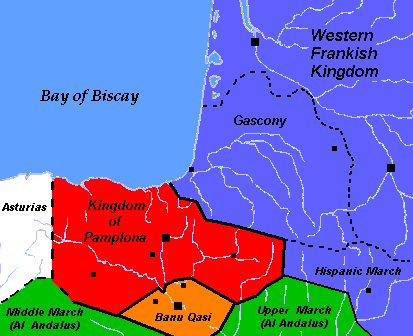
The Kingdom of Pamplona in the early 10th century

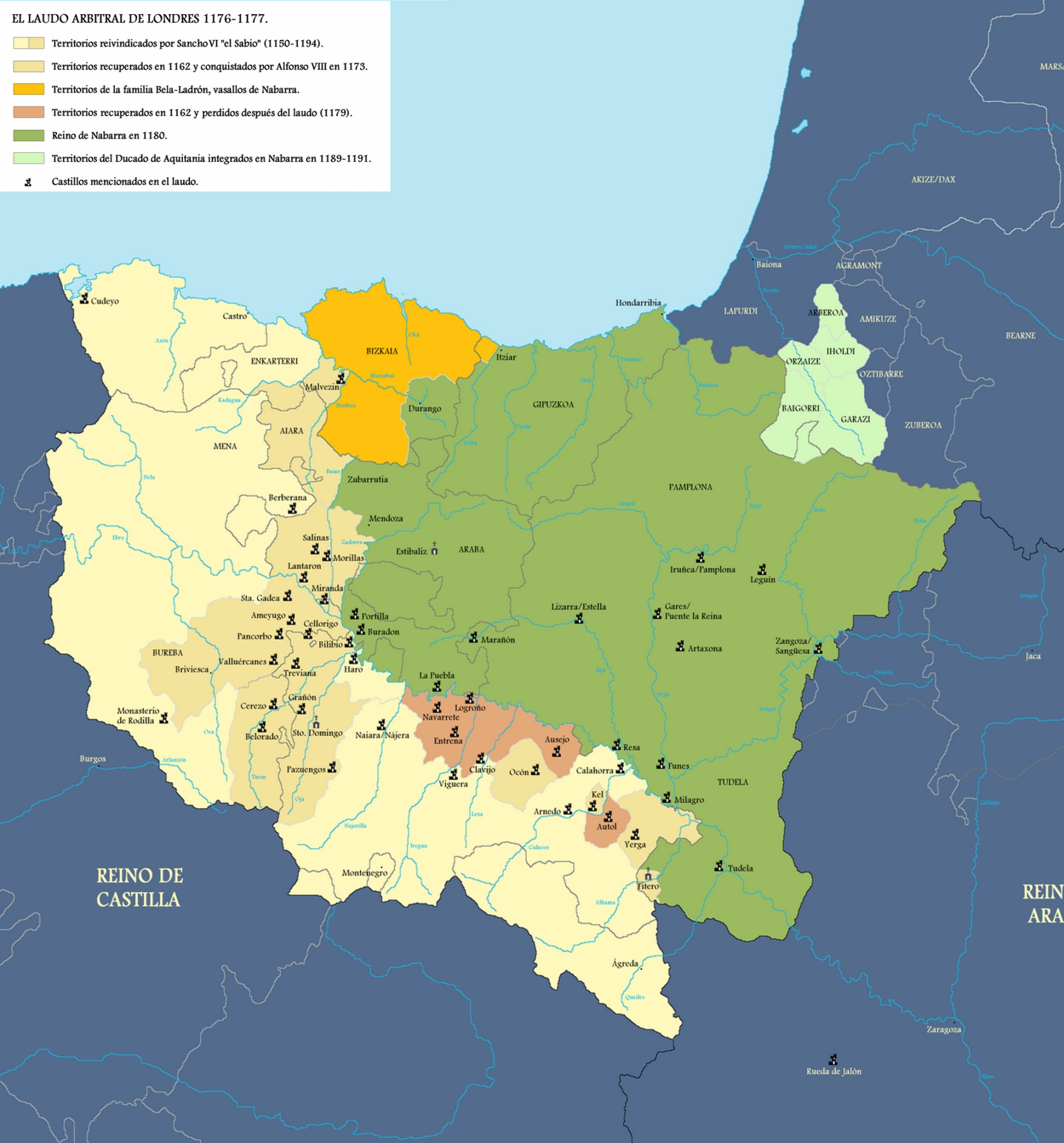
Navarrese territories circa 1179

Under Sancho III the Great, Pamplona controlled much of the southern Basque Country, extending from Burgos and Santander to northern Aragon. Through marriage, he also held Castile and protectorates over Gascony and León. However, in 1058, the Duchy of Vasconia became Gascony and united with Aquitaine, progressively distancing from Basque political and ethnic identity.

Following Sancho III's death, Castile and Aragon became separate kingdoms under his sons, dividing Pamplona in 1076. The Kingdom of Pamplona (later Navarre) diminished while Aragón expanded into the Ebro valley, where Romance languages including Navarro-Aragonese replaced Basque in many areas.

The Kingdom of Navarre was restored in 1157 under García Ramírez "the Restorer", who fought Castile over western lands such as La Rioja and Álava. Mid-12th century Navarrese monarchs granted town charters in contested regions to consolidate authority.

Castilian kings reinforced control over Navarrese borders and expanded commercial routes, founding new towns along the way.

== Basque sailors ==
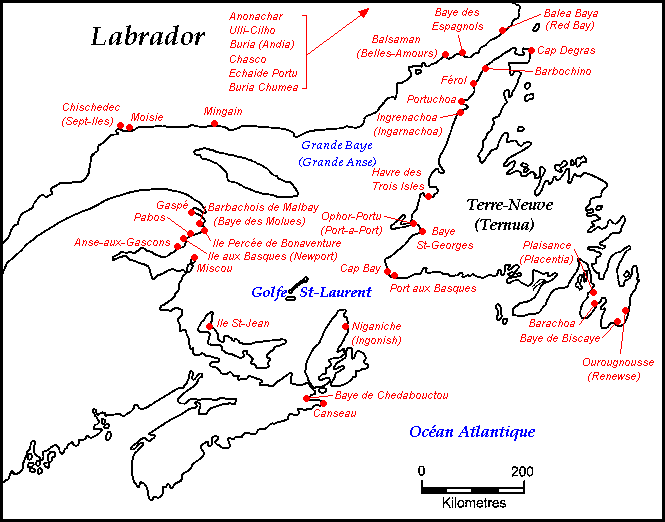
Basque fishing sites in Canada in the 16th and 17th centuries

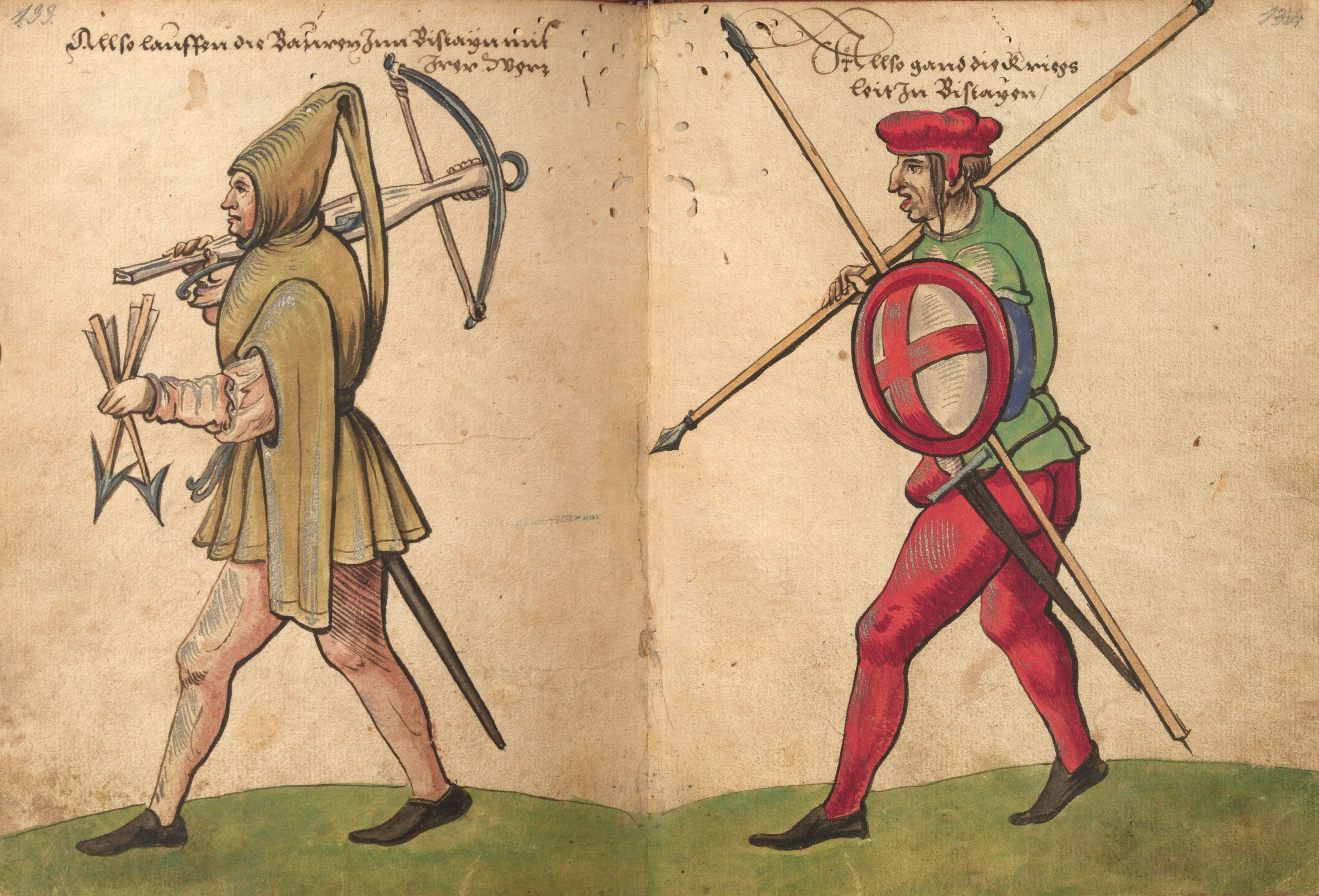
Basque warriors in military outfit (1530s)

Basques were early pioneers of Atlantic maritime ventures. The earliest mention of Basque whale oil dates to 670, and in 1059 whalers from Lapurdi presented the first whale oil to their viscount. While Basques reportedly disliked whale meat, they traded whale products successfully with the French, Castilians, and Flemings.

Following the Castilian conquests (1199–1201) of Gipuzkoa, Durango, and Álava, many coastal towns thrived on fishing and maritime trade. Basque shipyards and ironworks expanded their naval capabilities, using longboats or traineras.

Whaling and cod-fishing brought Basques into contact with the North Sea and Newfoundland from the early 16th century.

The rudder may have been a Basque invention, as suggested by 12th-century frescoes in Estella-Lizarra and historical seals describing steering “à la Navarraise” or “à la Bayonnaise.”

Magellan's expedition included at least 35 Basque sailors; after Magellan's death in the Philippines, Basque Juan Sebastián Elcano completed the circumnavigation. Basques also famously mutinied during Christopher Columbus' voyages.

In 1615, Icelandic forces massacred 32 Gipuzkoan whalers in the Spánverjavígin, an order later revoked in 2015 during a Basque-Icelandic reconciliation.

== Modern period ==
=== Self-government status and accommodation ===
==== Navarre divided and home rule ====
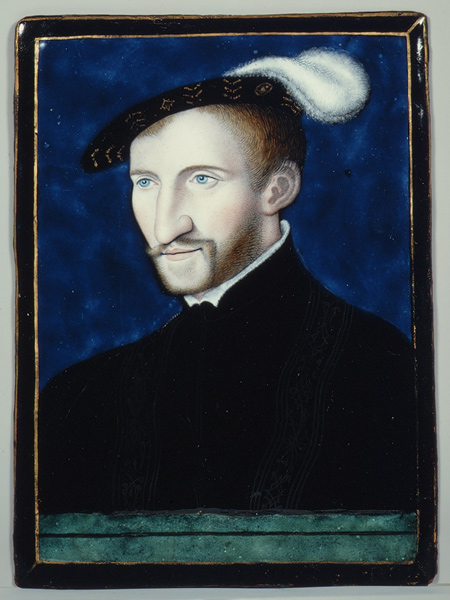
King Henry II called the Parliament of Navarre in Saint-Palais, with a requirement for all its members to have a command in Basque (1523)

Basques in the present-day Spanish and French districts of the Basque Country managed to retain a large degree of self-government within their respective districts, practically functioning initially as separate nation-states. The western Basques managed to confirm their home rule at the end of the Kingdom of Castile's civil wars, pledging an oath to claimant Isabella I of Castile in exchange for generous terms in overseas trade. Their fueros recognised separate laws, taxation and courts in each district. As the Middle Ages drew to a close, the Basques got sandwiched between two rising superpowers after the Spanish conquest of Iberian Navarre, i.e. France and Spain. Most of the Basque population ended up in Spain, or "the Spains", according to its poly-centric arrangement prevailing under the Habsburgs. The initial repression in Navarre on the local nobility and population (1513, 1516, 1523) was followed by a softer, compromising policy on the part of Ferdinand II of Aragon and the emperor Charles V. While heavily conditioned by its geopolitical situation, the Kingdom of Navarre-Bearn remained independent and attempts at reunification, both in Iberian and continental Navarre, did not cease up to 1610—King Henry of Navarre and France was set to march over Navarre at the moment of his assassination.

The Protestant Reformation made some inroads and was supported by Queen Jeanne d'Albret of Navarre-Bearn. The printing of books in Basque, mostly on Christian themes, was introduced in the late 16th century by the Basque-speaking bourgeoisie around Bayonne in the northern Basque Country. King Henry III of Navarre, a Protestant, converted to Roman Catholicism in order to become King Henry IV of France too ("Paris is well worth a mass"). However, Reformist ideas, imported via the vibrant Ways of Saint James and sustained by the Kingdom of Navarre-Bearn, were subject to intense persecution by the Spanish Inquisition and other institutions as early as 1521, especially in bordering areas, a matter with close links to the shaky status of Navarre.

On the whale hunt, as depicted on the coat of arms of Biarritz

The Parliament of Navarre in Pamplona (The Three States, Cortes) kept denouncing King Philip II of Spain's breach of the binding terms laid out in his oath taking ceremony—tension came to a head in 1592 with an imposed oath pledging for Philip III of Spain fraught with irregularities—while in 1600 allegations arise of discrimination by Castilian abbots and bishops to the Navarrese monks "for the sake of their nation", as pointed by the Kingdom's Government (the Diputación). A combination of factors—suspicion of the Basques, intolerance to a different language, religious practices, traditions, high status held by women in the area (cf. whaling campaigns), along with political intrigues involving the lords of Urtubie in Urruña and the critical Urdazubi abbey—led to the Basque witch trials in 1609.

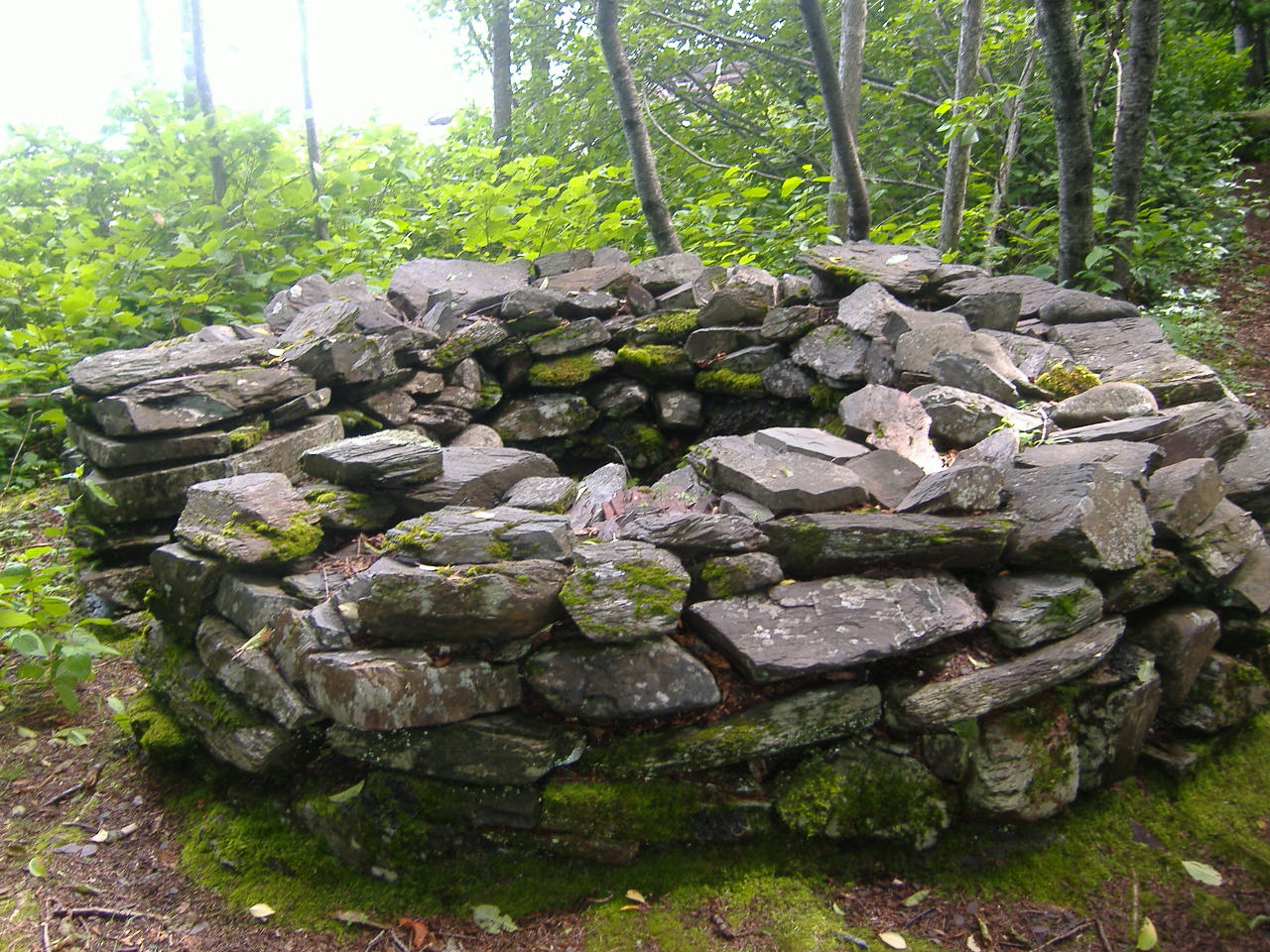
A furnace to melt whale grease left by the Basques in Île aux Basques off Canada's coast

In 1620 the de jure separate Lower Navarre was absorbed by the Kingdom of France, and in 1659 the Treaty of the Pyrenees upheld actual Spanish and French territorial control and determined the fate of vague bordering areas, so establishing customs that did not exist up to that point and restricting free cross-border access. The measures decided were implemented as of 1680.

The region specific laws also underwent a gradual erosion and devaluation, more so in the French Basque Country than in the southern districts. In 1660 the authority of the Assembly of Labourd (Biltzar of Ustaritz) was significantly curtailed. In 1661 French centralization and the nobility's ambition to take over and privatize commons unleashed a popular rebellion in Soule—led by Bernard Goihenetche "Matalaz"—ultimately quelled in blood. However, Labourd and its Biltzar retained important attributions and autonomy, showing an independent fiscal system.

==== Masters of the ocean ====
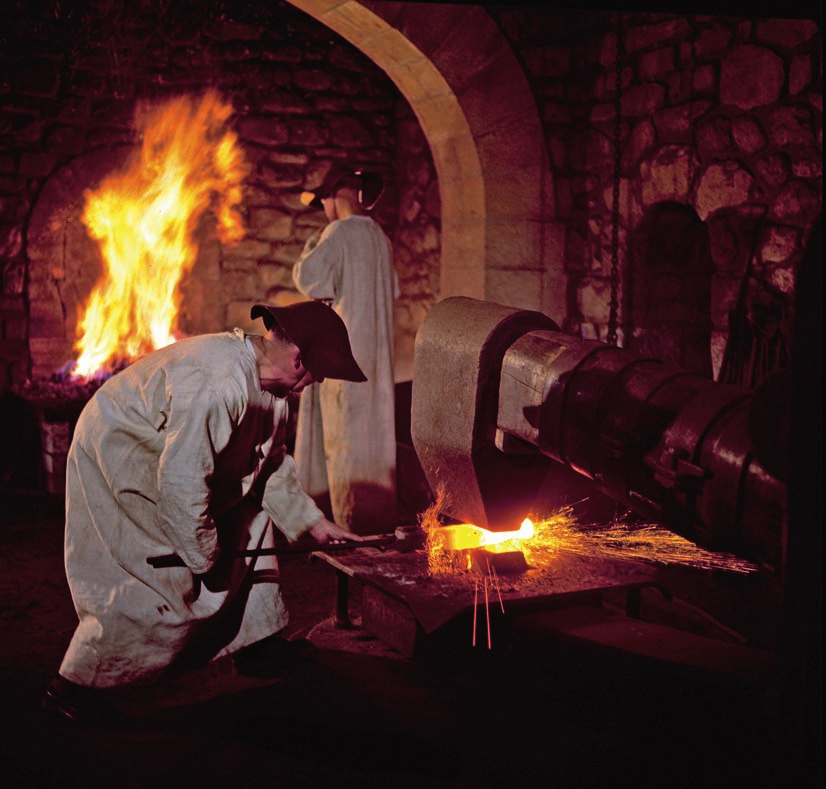
Blacksmiths dressed up in period attire at an ironwork re-enactment in Legazpi

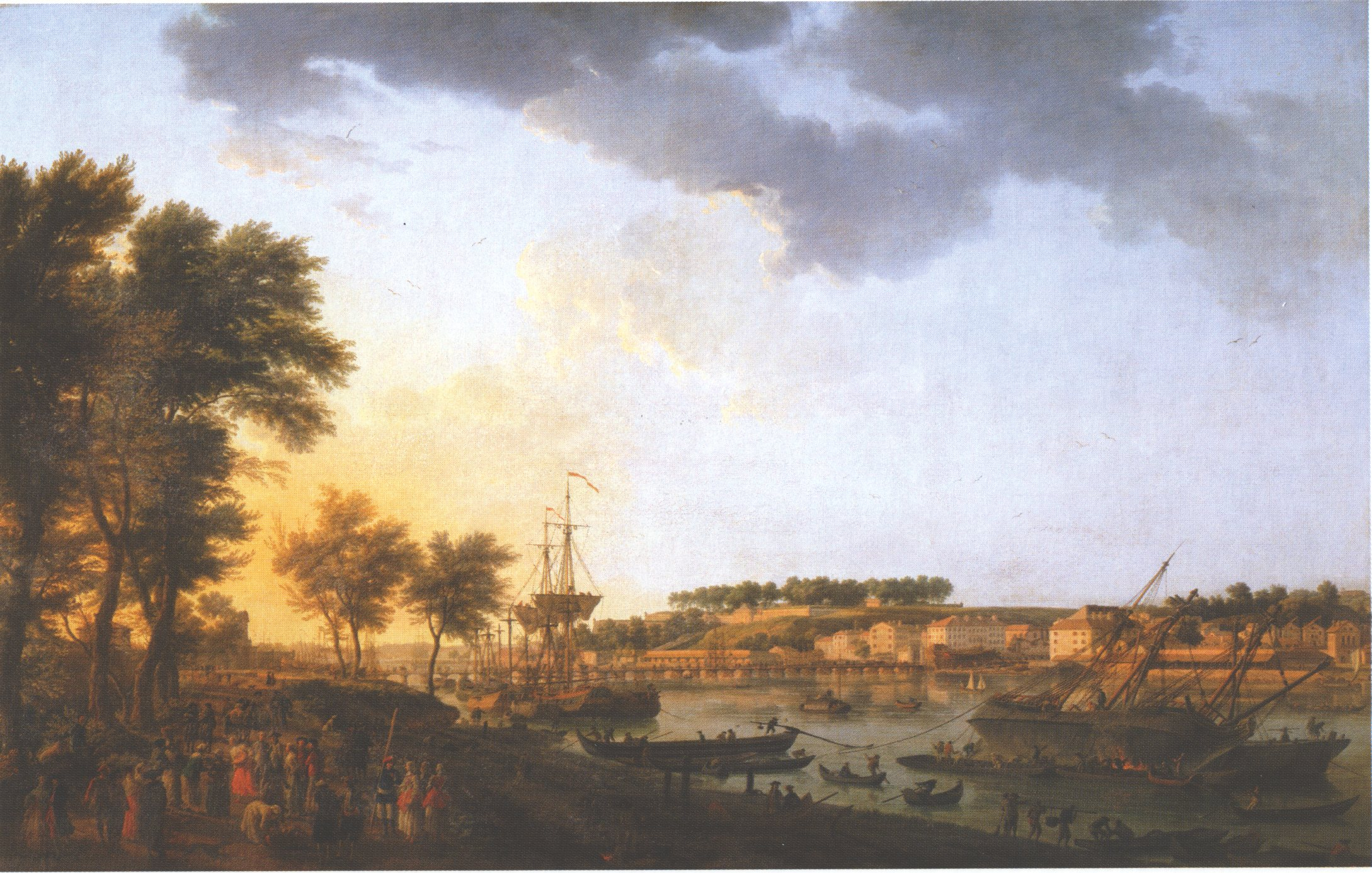
Harbour of Bayonne in 1755, at the height of trade within the Guipuzcoan Company of Caracas

The Basques (or Biscaynes), especially proper Biscayans Gipuzkoans and Lapurdians, thrived on whale hunting, shipbuilding, iron exportation to England, and trade with northern Europe and North America during the 16th century, at which time the Basques became the masters not only of whaling but the Atlantic Ocean. However, King Philip II of Spain's failed Armada Invencible endeavour in 1588, largely relying on heavy whaling and trade galleons confiscated from the reluctant Basques, proved disastrous. The Spanish defeat triggered the immediate collapse of Basque supremacy over the oceans and the rise of English hegemony. As whaling declined privateering soared.

Many Basques found in the Castilian-Spanish Empire an opportunity to promote their social position and venture to America to make a living and sometimes amass a little fortune that spurred the foundation of the present-day baserris. Basques serving under the Spanish flag became renowned sailors, and many of them were among the first Europeans to reach America. For example, Christopher Columbus's first expedition to the New World was partially manned by Basques, the Santa Maria vessel was made in Basque shipyards, and the owner, Juan de la Cosa, may have been a Basque.

Other seamen became renowned as privateers for the French and Spanish kings alike, namely Joanes Suhigaraitxipi from Bayonne (17th century) and Étienne Pellot (Hendaye), "the last privateer" (early 19th century). By the end of the 16th century, Basques were conspicuously present in America, notably in New Spain (Mexico) in the province of Nueva Vizcaya (now Durango and Chihuahua), Chile, Potosí. In the latter, we hear that they went on to cluster around a national confederacy engaging in war against another one, the Vicuñas, formed by a melting pot of Spanish colonists and Native Americans (1620–1625).

==== A Basque trade area ====
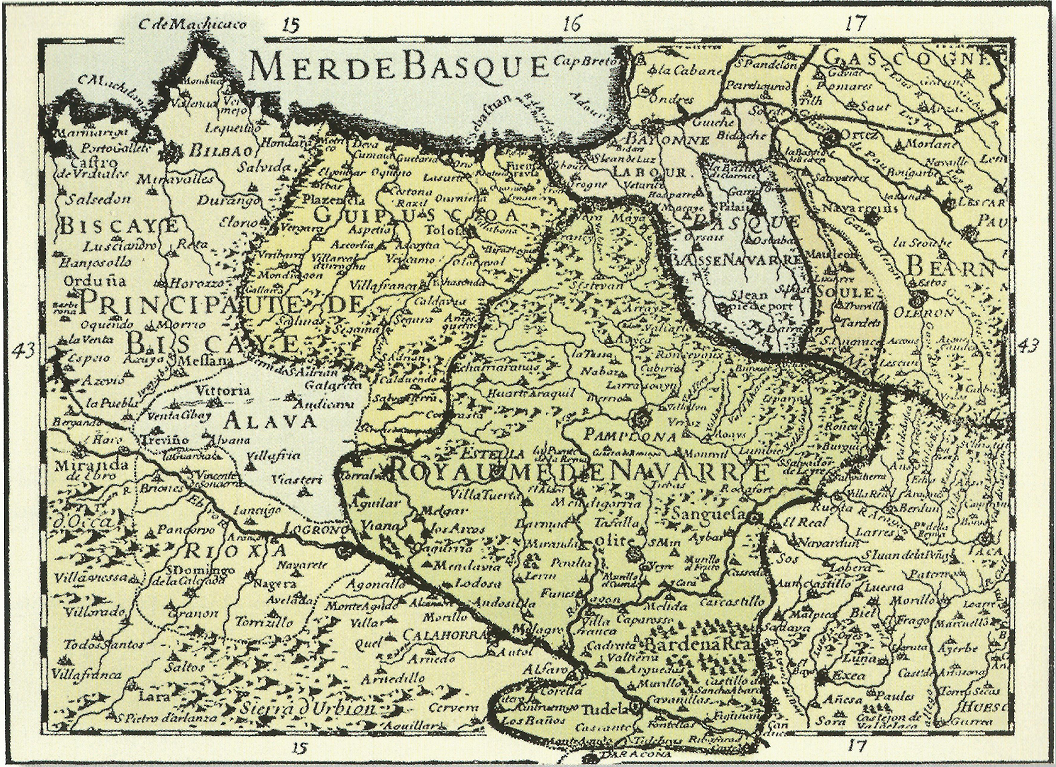
French map of the Basque districts (mid-18th century)

The Basques initially welcomed Philip V—from the lineage of King Henry III of Navarre—to the Crown of Castile (1700), but the absolutist outlook inherited from his grandfather, Louis XIV, could hardly withstand the test of the Basque contractual system. The 1713 Treaty of Utrecht (see Basque sailors above) and the 1714 suppression of home rule in the Kingdom of Aragon and the Principality of Catalonia disquieted the Basques. It did not take long until the Spanish king, relying on prime minister Giulio Alberoni, attempted to enlarge his tax revenue and foster a Spanish internal market by meddling in the Basque low-tax trade area and moving Basque customs from the Ebro to the coast and the Pyrenees. With their overseas and customary cross-Pyrenean trade—and by extension home rule—under threat, the royal advance was responded by the western Basques with a trail of matxinadas, or uprisings, that shook 30 towns in coastal areas (Biscay, Gipuzkoa). Spanish troops were sent over, and the widespread rebellion quelled in blood.

In the wake of the events, an expedition led by the Duke of Berwick dispatched by the Quadruple Alliance broke into Spanish territory by the western Pyrenees (April 1719) only to find Gipuzkoans, Biscayans and Álavans making a formal, conditional recognition of French rule (August 1719). Confronted with a collapsing Basque loyalty, King Philip V backed down on his designs in favour of bringing customs back to the Ebro (1719). A pardon to the leaders of the rebellion in 1726 paved the way to an understanding of the Basque regional governments with Madrid officials, and the ensuing foundation of the Royal Guipuzcoan Company of Caracas in 1728. The Basque districts in Spain kept operating virtually as independent republics.

The Guipuzcoan Company greatly added to the prosperity of the Basque districts, by exporting iron commodities and importing products such as cacao, tobacco, and hides. Merchandise imported on to the Spanish heartland in turn would incur no duties in its customs. The vibrant trade that followed added to a flourishing building activity and the establishment of the pivotal Royal Basque Society, led by Xavier Maria de Munibe, for the encouragement of science and arts.

Emigration to America did not stop, with Basques—reputed for their close solidarity bonds, high organizational skills and an industrious disposition—found venturing into Upper California at the head of the early expeditions and governor positions, e.g. Fermín Lasuén, Juan Bautista de Anza, Diego de Borica, J.J. de Arrillaga, etc. At home, the need for technical innovations—not encouraged any longer by the Spanish Crown during the last third of the 18th century—the virtual exhaustion of the forests supplying the ironworks, and the decline of the Guipuzcoan Company of Caracas after the end of its trade monopoly with America heralded a major economic and political crisis.

By the end of the 18th century the Basques were deprived of their customary trade with America and choked by the Spanish disproportionately high customs duties in the Ebro river, but at least enjoyed a fluent internal market and intensive trade with France. Navarre's geographic distribution of trade in late 18th century is estimated at 37.2% with France (unspecified), 62.3% with other Basque districts, and only 0.5% with the Spanish heartland. On a positive note the Spanish customs exactions imposed over the Ebro favoured a more European orientation and the circulation of innovative ideas—labelled by many in Spain as "un-Spanish"—both technical and humanistic, such as Rousseau's 'social contract', hailed especially by the Basque liberals, who widely supported home rule (fueros). Cross-Pyrenean contacts among Basque scholars and public personalities also intensified, increasing awareness of a common identity beyond district specific practices.

=== Under the nation-states ===
==== Revolution and war ====
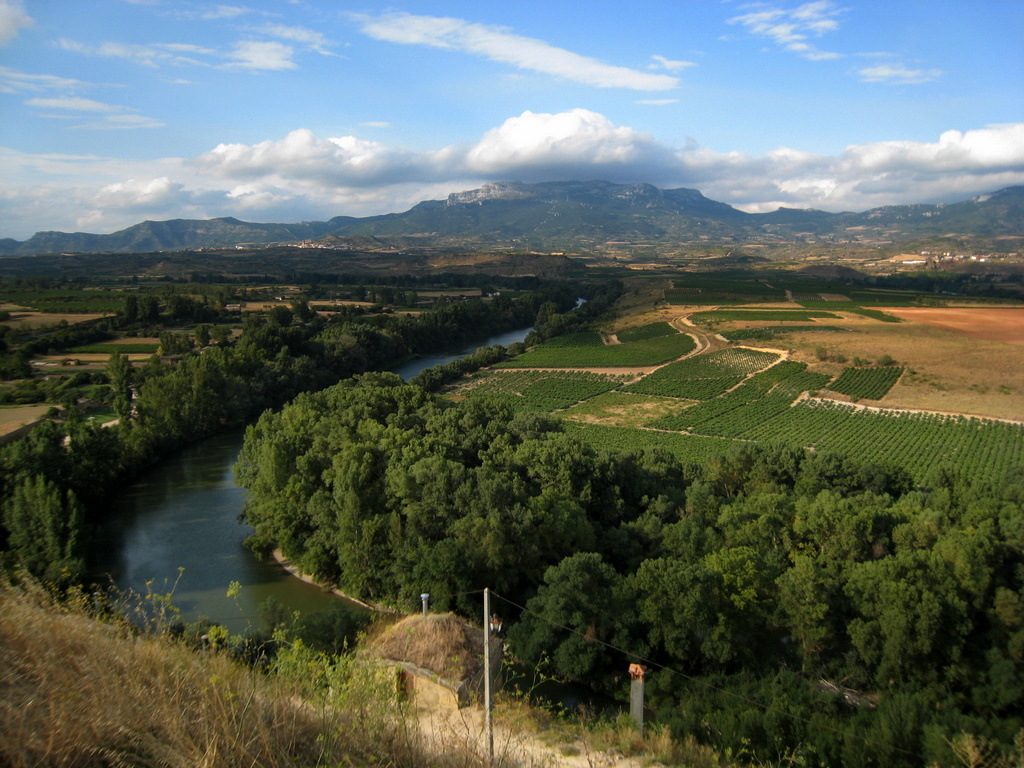
Ebro river winding down La Rioja of Álava and on into the Ribera of Navarre, both fertile grounds for vineyards and cereal crops

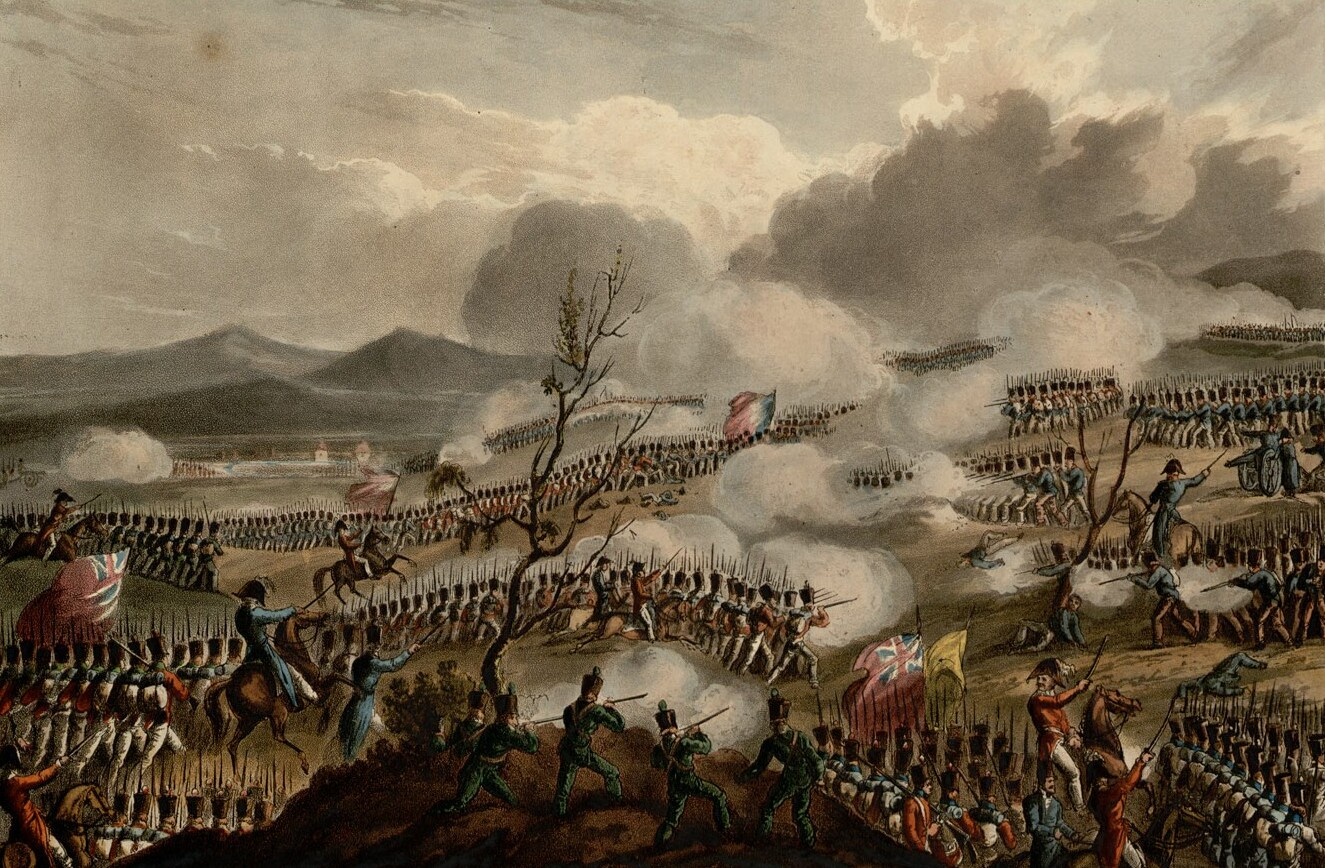
Battle of Nivelle, follow-up to San Sebastián's destruction (1813)

Self-government in the northern Basque Country came to an abrupt end when the French Revolution centralized government and abolished the region specific powers recognized by the ancien régime. The French political design intently pursued a dissolution of the Basque identity into a new French nation, and in 1793 that French national ideal was enforced with terror over the population. During the period of the French Convention (up to 1795), Labourd (Sara, Itxassou, Biriatu, Ascain, etc.) went on to be shaken by indiscriminate mass deportation of civilians to the Landes of Gascony, confiscations, and the death of hundreds. It has been argued that despite its 'fraternal' intent, the intervention of the French Revolution actually destroyed a highly participatory political culture, based on the provincial assemblies (the democratic Biltzar, and the other Estates).

The Southern Basque Country was mired in constant disputes with the royal Spanish authority—breach of fueros—and talks came to a deadlock on accession of Manuel Godoy to office. The central government started to enforce its decisions single-handedly, e.g. regional quotas in military mobilization, so the different Basque autonomous governments—Navarre, Gipuzkoa, Biscay, Álava—felt definitely disenfranchised. During the War of the Pyrenees and the Peninsular War, the impending threat to the self-government on the part of the Spanish royal authority was critical for war events and alliances—cf. Bon-Adrien Jeannot de Moncey's letters, and political developments in Gipuzkoa. The liberal class supporting self-government was quelled by the Spanish authorities following the War of the Pyrenees—court-martial in Pamplona as of 1796.

Manuel Godoy's attempt to establish in Bilbao a parallel harbour under direct royal control was perceived as a blatant interference with what were considered internal affairs of the Basques, and was met with the Zamacolada uprising in Bilbao, a broad-based riot including several cross-class interests, violently quashed by the intervention of the Spanish military (1804). The offensive on the ground was accompanied by an attempt to discredit the sources of Basque self-government as Castile granted privileges, notably Juan Antonio Llorente's Noticias históricas de las tres provincias vascongadas... (1806–1808), commissioned by the Spanish government, praised by Godoy, and immediately contested by native scholars with their own works—P.P. Astarloa, J.J. Loizaga Castaños, etc. Napoleon, stationed in Bayonne (Castle of Marracq), took good note of the Basque dissatisfaction.

While the traumatic war developments above pushed some Basques to counter-revolutionary positions, others saw an option through. A project drafted with the input of the Basque revolutionary D.J. Garat to establish a Basque principality was not implemented in the 1808 Bayonne Statute, but different identities were acknowledged within the Crown of Spain and a framework (of little certitude) for the Basque specificity was provided for on its wording. With the Peninsular War in full swing, two short-lived civil constituencies were eventually created directly answerable to France: Biscay (present-day Basque Autonomous Community) and Navarre, along with other territories to the north of the Ebro. The Napoleonic Army, allowed in Spain as an ally in 1808, at start encountered little difficulty in keeping the southern Basque districts loyal to the occupier, but the tide started to turn when it became apparent that the French attitude was self-serving. Meanwhile, the Spanish Constitution of Cádiz (March 1812) ignored the Basque institutional reality and talked of a sole nation within the Spanish Crown, the Spanish, which in turn sparked Basque reluctance and opposition. On 18 October 1812, the acting Biscayan Regional Council was called in Bilbao by the Basque militia commander Gabriel Mendizabal, with the assembly agreeing on the submission of deputies to Cádiz with a negotiation request.

"The Basques have always been a nation, their hallmarks being independence, isolation, and courage. They have always spoken their ancient language, and have constituted a confederation of small republics, related by their common ancestry and language."
Diccionario geográfico-estadístico-histórico de España (Pascual Madoz, 1850)

Not only did the demand fall on deaf ears, but the Council of Cádiz submitted the military commander Francisco Javier Castaños to Bilbao with the purpose of "restoring order." Pamplona also refused to give a blank check, Navarre's deputy in Cádiz asked for permission to discuss the matter and call the Parliament of Navarre (the Cortes)—the jurisdictional organ of the Kingdom. Again the plea was rejected, with the native commander Francisco Espoz y Mina strong in Navarre deciding in turn to forbid his men to pledge an oath to the new Constitution.

By the end of the Peninsular War, the devastation of the maritime commerce of Labourd started in the War of the Pyrenees was complete, while across the Bidasoa, San Sebastian was reduced to rubble (September 1813). The restoration of Ferdinand VII and the formal comeback of Basque institutions (May–August 1814) saw an overturn of the liberal stipulations approved on the 1812 Constitution of Cádiz, but also a serial breach of basic fueros provisions (contrafueros) that came to shake the foundations of the Basque legal framework, such as fiscal sovereignty and specificity of military draft. The end of the Trienio Liberal in Spain brought to prominence the most staunchly Catholic, traditionalists, and absolutists in Navarre, who attempted to restore the Inquisition and established in 1823 the so-called Comisiones Militares, aimed at orthodoxy and scrutiny of inconvenient individuals. Ironically they and Ferdinand VII ended up implementing the centralizing agenda of the Spanish liberals, but without any of its benefits.

==== First Carlist War and the end of the fueros ====
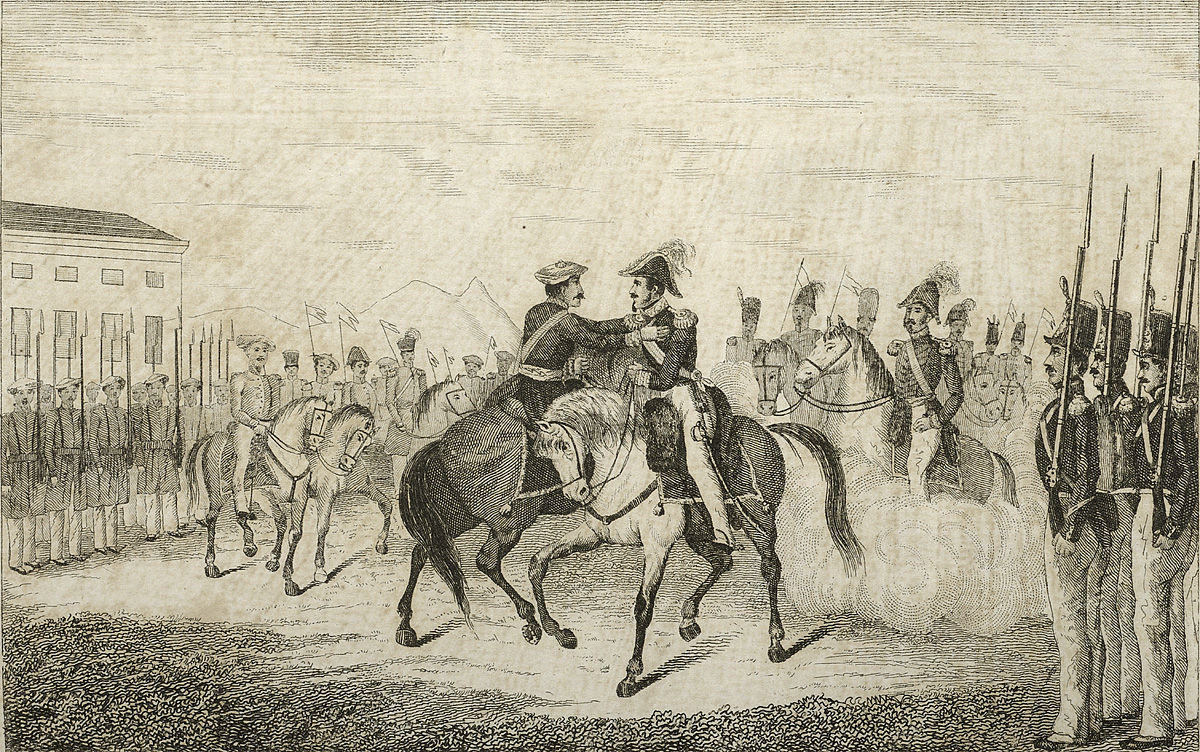
Embrace of Bergara, the final act of the First Carlist War (1839)

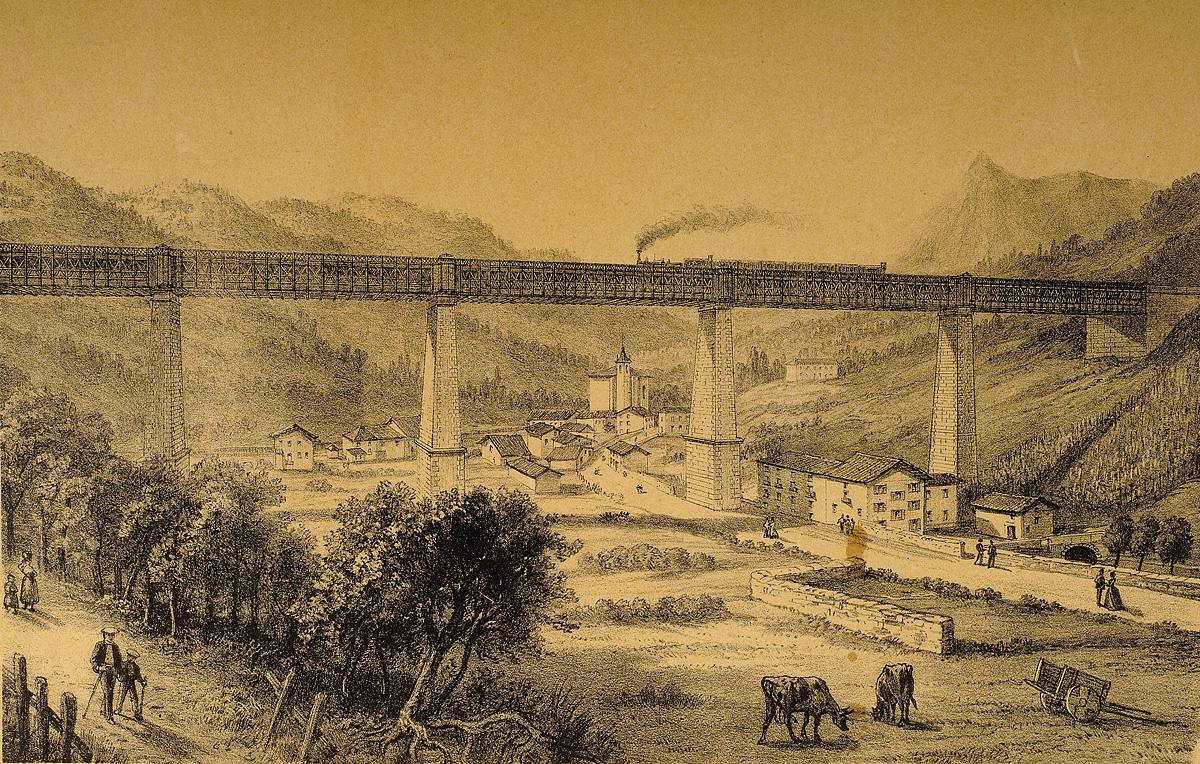
Railway bridge engineered by Eiffel's company over Ormaiztegi, home town of Tomas de Zumalacarregui

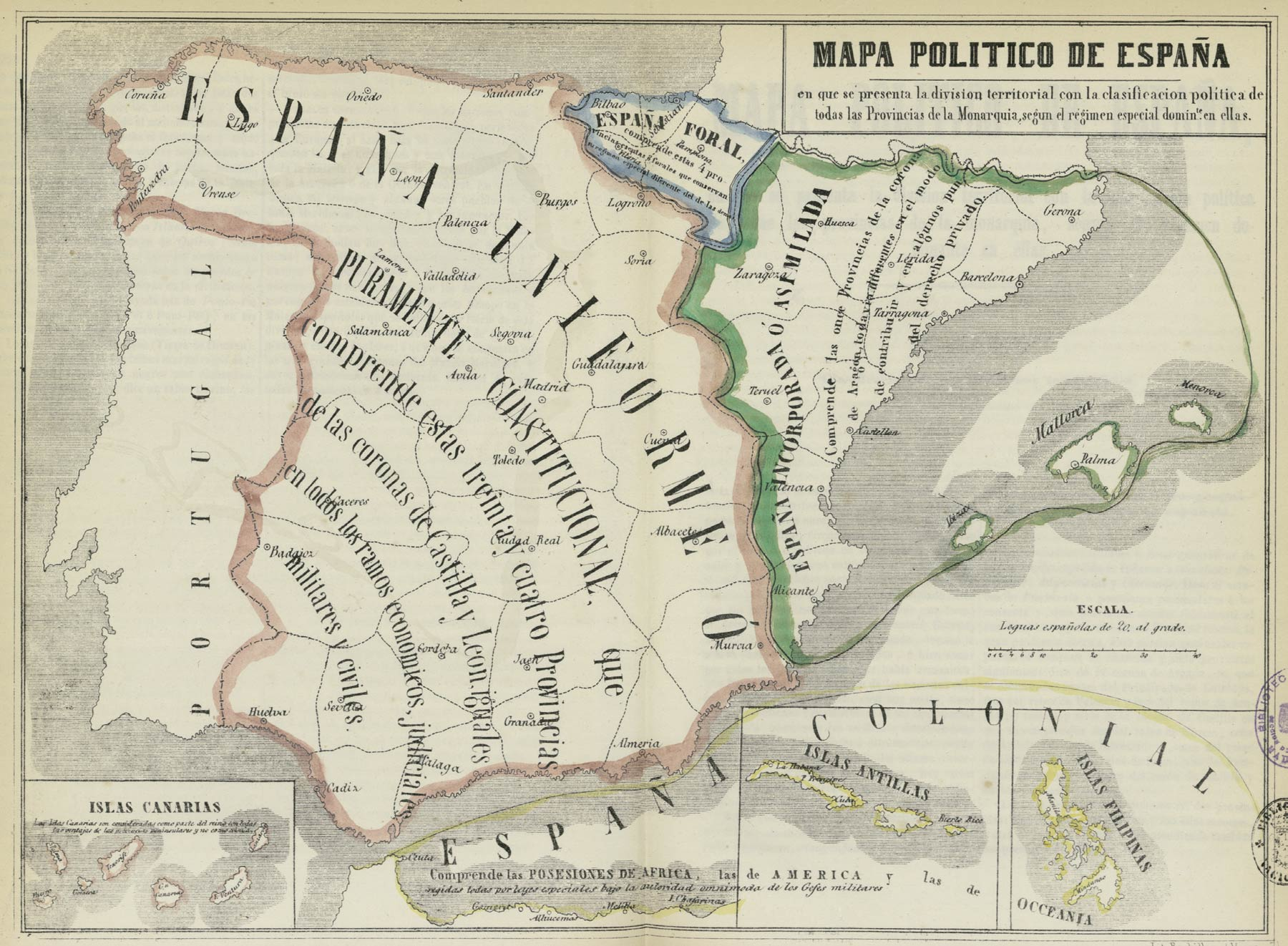
Political Spain in 1854, after the First Carlist War

The Gernikako Arbola anthem

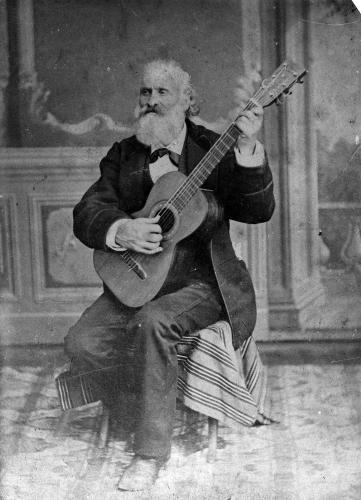
Jose Maria Iparragirre, a volunteer with the Carlists, a bard, an exile, and an emigrant to America

Fearing that they would lose their self-government (fueros) under a modern, liberal Spanish constitution, Basques in Spain rushed to join the traditionalist army led the charismatic Basque commander Tomas de Zumalacarregui, and financed largely by the governments of the Basque districts. The opposing Isabeline Army had the vital support of British, French (notably the Algerian legion) and Portuguese forces, and the backing of these governments. The Irish legion (Tercio) was virtually annihilated by the Basques in the Battle of Oriamendi.

However, the Carlist ideology was not in itself prone to stand up for the Basque specific institutions, traditions, and identity, but royal absolutism and Church, thriving in rural based environments and totally opposed to modern liberal ideas. They presented themselves as true Spaniards, and contributed to the Spanish centralizing drive. Despite the circumstances and their Catholicism, many Basques came to think that staunch conservatism was not leading them anywhere.

After Tomas Zumalacarregui's early and unexpected death during the Siege of Bilbao in 1835 and further military successes up to 1837, the First Carlist War started to turn against the Carlists, which in turn widened the gap between the Apostolic (official) and the Basque pro-fueros parties within the Carlist camp. Echoing a widespread malaise, J.A. Muñagorri took the lead of a faction advocating a split with claimant to the throne Carlos de Borbón under the banner "Peace and Fueros" (cf. Muñagorriren bertsoak). The dissatisfaction crystallized in the 1839 Embrace of Bergara and the subsequent Act for the Confirmation of the Fueros. It included a promise by the Spaniards to respect a reduced version of the previous Basque self-government. The pro-fueros liberals strong at the moment in war and poverty stricken Pamplona confirmed most of the above arrangements, but signed the separate 1841 "Compromise Act" (Ley Paccionada), whereby Navarre ceased officially to exist as a kingdom and was made into a Spanish province, but keeping a set of important prerogatives, including control over taxation.

Customs were then definitely moved from the Ebro river over to the coast and the Pyrenees, which destroyed the formerly lucrative Bayonne-Pamplona trade and much of the region's prosperity. The dismantling of the native political system had severe consequences throughout the Basque Country, leaving many families struggling to survive after the enforcement of the French Civil Code in the continental Basque region. The French legal arrangement deprived many families of their customary common lands and had their family property divided.

The new political design triggered also cross-border smuggling, and French Basques emigrated to the USA and other American destinations in large numbers. They account for about half of the total emigration from France during the 19th century, estimated at 50.000 to 100.000 inhabitants. The same fate—North and South America altogether—was followed by many other Basques, who during the following decades set out from Basque and other neighbouring ports (Santander, Bordeaux) in search for a better life, e.g. the bard Jose Maria Iparragirre, composer of the Gernikako Arbola, widely held as the Basque national anthem. In 1844, the Civil Guard, a paramilitary police force (cited in Iparragirre's popular song Zibilak esan naute), was established with a view to defend and spread the idea of a Spanish central state, particularly in rural areas, while the 1856 education reform consciously promoted the use of the Castilian (Spanish) language.

The economic scene in the French Basque Country, badly affected by war developments up to 1814 and intermittently cut off since 1793 from its customary trade flow with fellow Basque districts to the south, was languid and marked by small scale exploitation of natural resources in the rural milieu, e.g. mining, salt extraction, farming and wool processing, flour mills, etc. Bayonne remained the main trade hub, while Biarritz thrived as a seaside tourist resort for the elites (Empress Eugenie's venue in 1854). During this period, Álava and Navarre showed little economic dynamism, remaining largely attached to rural activity with a small middle-class based in the capital cities—Vitoria-Gasteiz and Pamplona.

The centuries long forge (ironwork) network linked to readily available timber, abundant waterways, and proximity of coastal harbours saw its final agony, but some kept operating—north of Navarre, Gipuzkoa, Biscay. A critical moment for the development of heavy metal industry came with the introduction in 1855 of Bessemer blast furnaces for the mass-production of steel in the Bilbao area. In 1863 the Regional Council of Biscay liberalized the exportation of iron ore, and in the same year the first mining railway line was pressed into operation. A rapid development followed, encouraged by a dynamic local bourgeoisie, coastal location, availability of technical know-how, an inflow of foreign steel industry investors—partnering with a local family owned group Ybarra y Cía—as well as Spanish and foreign high demand for iron ore. The transfer of the Spanish customs border from the southern boundary of the Basque Country to the Spanish-French border ultimately encouraged the inclusion of Spain's Basque districts in a new Spanish market, the protectionism of which favoured in that respect the birth and growth of Basque industry.

The Compañía del Norte railway company, a Credit Mobilier franchise, arrived at the bordering town of Irun in 1865, while the French railway cut its way along the Basque coast all the way to Hendaye in 1864 (Bayonne in 1854). The arrival of the railway was to have a deep social, economic and cultural impact, sparking both admiration and opposition. With the expansion of the railway network, industry also developed in Gipuzkoa following a different pattern—slower, distributed across different valleys, and centred on metallic manufacturing and processing, thanks to local expertise and entrepreneurship.

In the run-up to the Third (Second) Carlist War (1872–1876), the implementation of the treaties concluding the First Carlist War was faced with tensions arising from the Spanish Government's attempt to alter by faits accomplis the spirit and print of the agreements in respect of finances and taxation, the crowning jewels of the Southern Basque Country's separate status along with the specificity of the military draft. Following the instability of the I Spanish Republic (1868) and the struggle for dynastic succession in Madrid, by 1873 the Carlists made themselves strong in Navarre and expanded their territorial grip all over the Southern Basque Country except for the capital cities, establishing de facto a Basque state with a seat in Estella-Lizarra, where claimant to the throne Carlos VII had settled. The ruling Carlist government included not only judiciary arrangements for military matters but the establishment of civil tribunals, as well as its own currency and stamps.

However, the Carlists failed to capture the four capitals in the territory, bringing about attrition and the gradual collapse of Carlist military strength starting in summer 1875. Other theatres of war in Spain (Castile, Catalonia) were no exception, with the Carlists undergoing a wide number of setbacks that contributed to the eventual victory of King Alfonso XII's Spanish army. Its columns advanced and took over Irun and Estella-Lizarra by February 1876. This time the rising Spanish Prime Minister Canovas del Castillo stated that no agreement bound him, and went on to decree the "Act for the Abolition of the Basque Charters", with its 1st article proclaiming the "duties the political Constitution has always imposed on all the Spanish." The Basque districts in Spain including Navarre lost their sovereignty and were assimilated to the Spanish provinces, still preserving a small set of prerogatives (the Basque Economic Agreements, and the 1841 Compromise Act for Navarre).

== Late Modern history ==
=== Late 19th century ===
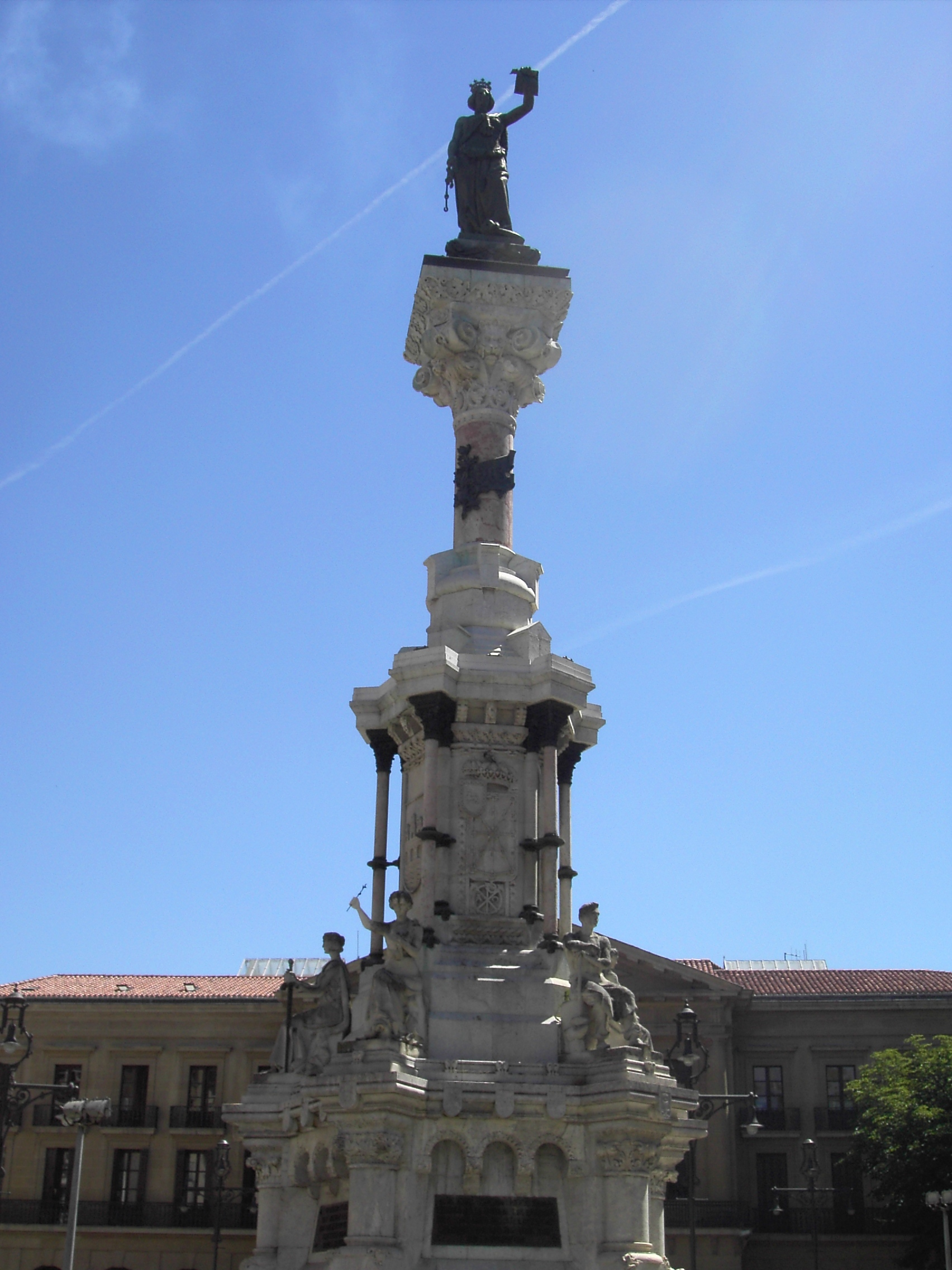
Memorial erected in Pamplona to the traditional Laws of Navarre (1903): "We, the Basques of today, in memory of our eternal ancestors, have gathered here to show our determination to keep Our Laws"

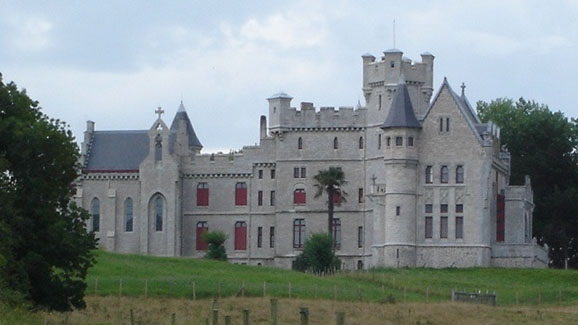
Antoine d'Abbadie's castle in Hendaye

The loss of the Charters in 1876 spawned political dissent and unrest, with two traditionalist movements arising to counter the Spanish centralist and comparatively liberal stance, the Carlists and the Basque nationalists. The former emphasized staunchly catholic and absolutist values, while the latter stressed Catholicism and the charters mingled with a Basque national awareness (Jaungoikoa eta Lege Zarra). Besides showing at the beginning slightly different positions, the Basque nationalists took hold in the industrialised Biscay and to a lesser extent Gipuzkoa, while the Carlist entrenched themselves especially in the rural Navarre and to a lesser extent in Álava.

With regards to the economic activity, high quality iron ore mainly from western Biscay, processed up to the early 19th century in small traditional ironworks around the western Basque Country, was now exported to Britain for industrial processing (see section above). Between 1878 and 1900 58 million tons of ore were exported from the Basque Country to Great Britain. The profits gained in this exportation was in turn reinvested by local entrepreneurs in iron and steel industry, a move spurring an "industrial revolution" that was to spread from Bilbao and the Basque Country across Spain, despite the economic incompetence shown by the Spanish central government.

Following up economic developments started in mid-19th century and given the momentum of the Spanish internal market after the end of the fueros, Biscay developed its own modern blast furnaces and heavier mining, while industrialization took off in Gipuzkoa. The large numbers of workers which both required were initially drawn from the Basque countryside and the peasantry of nearby Castile and Rioja, but increasingly immigration began to flow from the remoter impoverished regions of Galicia and Andalusia. The Basque Country, hitherto a source of emigrants to France, Spain and America, faced for the first time in recent history the prospect of a massive influx of foreigners possessing different languages and cultures as a side-effect of industrialisation. Most of these immigrants spoke Spanish; practically all were very poor.

The French railway arrived at Hendaye (Hendaia) in 1864, so connecting Madrid and Paris. The railway provision for the Basque coast entailed not only a more fluent freight shipping, but a quicker expansion of the seaside spa model of Biarritz to San Sebastián, providing a steady flow of tourists, elitist first and middle class later—especially from Madrid. San Sebastián became the summer capital of Spain. The monarch, especially Maria Christina of Austria, vacationed there and was followed by the court. As a result of this, the game of Basque pelota and its associated betting become en vogue among the high class and several pelota court were opened in Madrid. At the same time, a regular immigration of administration and customs officials from the French and Spanish heartlands ensued, ignorant of local culture and often reluctant, even hostile to Basque language. However, meanwhile, prominent figures concerned with the decay of Basque culture started to promote initiatives aimed at enhancing its status and development, e.g. the renowned Antoine d'Abbadie, a major driving force behind the Lore Jokoak literary and cultural festivals, with the liberal San Sebastián also becoming a vibrant hotspot for Basque culture, featuring figures such as Serafin Baroja, poet-troubadour Bilintx, or play-writer Ramon Maria Labaien.

In this period, Biscay reached one of the highest mortality rates in Europe. While the poor working and living conditions of the nascent proletarian class provided a breeding ground for the new socialist and anarchist political movements characteristic of the late 19th century, the end of the 19th century also saw the birth of the above Basque nationalism. The Spanish government's failure to comply with the provisions established at the end of the Third Carlist War (1876) caused public outcry, crystallizing in the Gamazada popular uprising in Navarre (1893–1894) which provided a springboard for the incipient Basque nationalism. The Basque Nationalist Party was founded in 1895.

The PNV, pursuing the goal of independence or self-government for a Basque state (Euzkadi), represented an ideology which combined Christian-Democratic ideas with abhorrence towards Spanish immigrants whom they perceived as a threat to the ethnic, cultural and linguistic integrity of the Basque race while also serving as a channel for the importation of new-fangled, leftist (and "un-Basque") ideas.

=== Early 20th century ===
Industrialisation across the Atlantic basin Basque districts (Biscay, Gipuzkoa, north-western Álava) was further boosted by the outbreak of World War I in Europe. Spain remained neutral in the war conflict, with Basque steel production and export further expanding thanks to the demand of the European war effort. Basque gunsmiths being highly competent, working in small shops and not especially concerned about patent laws(seeing as coming to Spain and actually enforcing it in the court of law was more hassle than it was monetarily worth) allowed them to flourish into a handgun making industry to make up the shortfall for France as their home factories were required for many other things. Companies such as Star Bonifacio Echeverria saw incredible demand during this time for their pistols, both proprietary designs and a variant of the Colt 1903 Pocket Hammerless that were hand fitted pistols called the Ruby were made in the tens of thousands. This hand fitting caused problems because magazines had to be matched to the gun they were made for or they would not fit properly causing the gun to jam or not fit in at all. Ironically, the end of the European war in 1918 brought about the decline and transformation of the Basque industry. In the French Basque Country, its inhabitants were drafted to add to the French war effort. War took a heavy toll on the Basques, 6,000 died. It also significantly spurred the penetration of French nationalist ideas into Basque territory, limited to certain circles and contexts up to that point.

In 1931, at the outset of the Spanish 2nd Republic, echoing the recently granted self-government to Catalonia, an attempt was made to draw up a single statute for the Basque territories in Spain (Provincias Vascongadas and Navarra), but after an initial overwhelming approval of the draft and a round of council mayor meetings, Navarre pulled out of the draft project amidst heated controversy over the validity of the votes (Pamplona, 1932). Tellingly, the Carlist council of Pamplona claimed that "it is unacceptable to call [the territory included in the draft Statute] País Vasco-Navarro in Spanish. It is fine Vasconia, and Euskalerría, but not Euzkadi".

Undaunted, the Basque nationalists and leftist republican forces kept working on a statute, this time only for the Basque western provinces, Álava, Gipuzkoa and Biscay, eventually approved in 1936, with the Spanish Civil War already raging and an effective control just over Biscay.

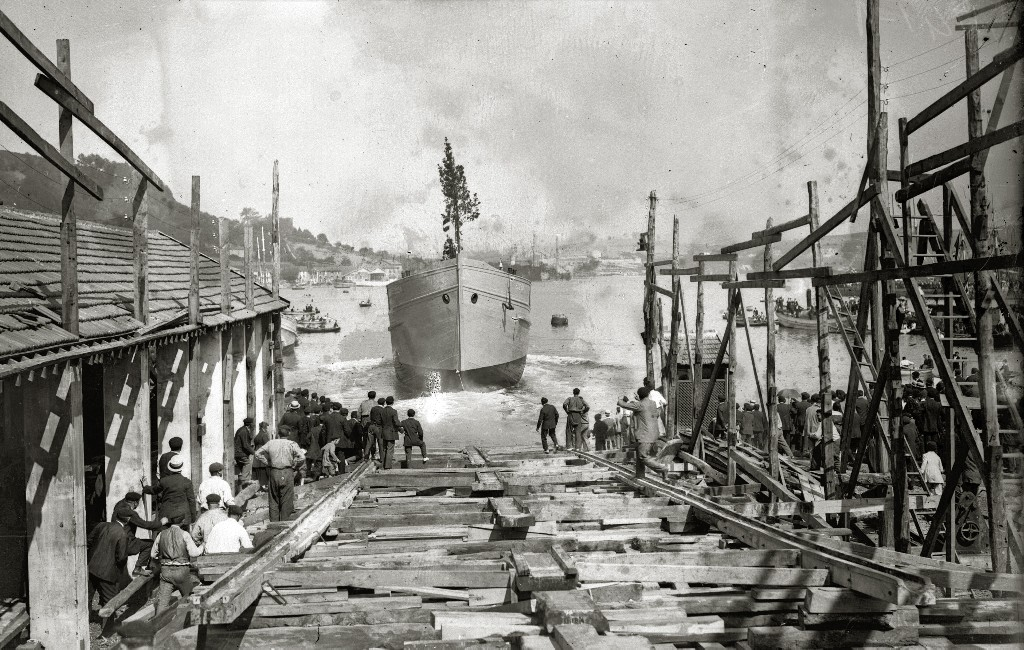
Launch of a boat at a shipyard in Pasaia, Gipuzkoa (1920)

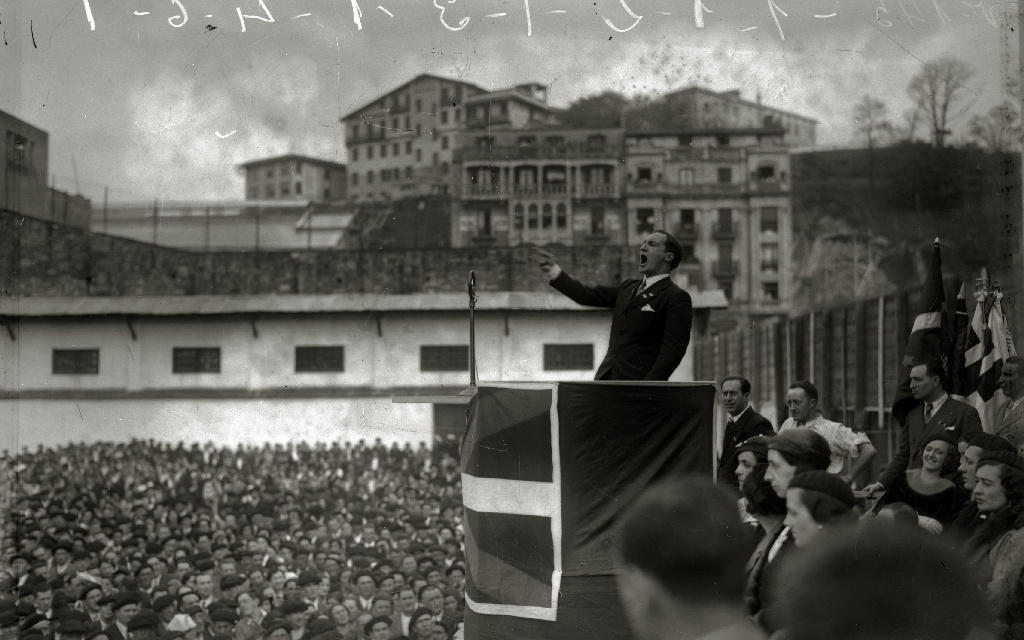
J.A. Antonio Aguirre at a party rally in San Sebastián (1933)

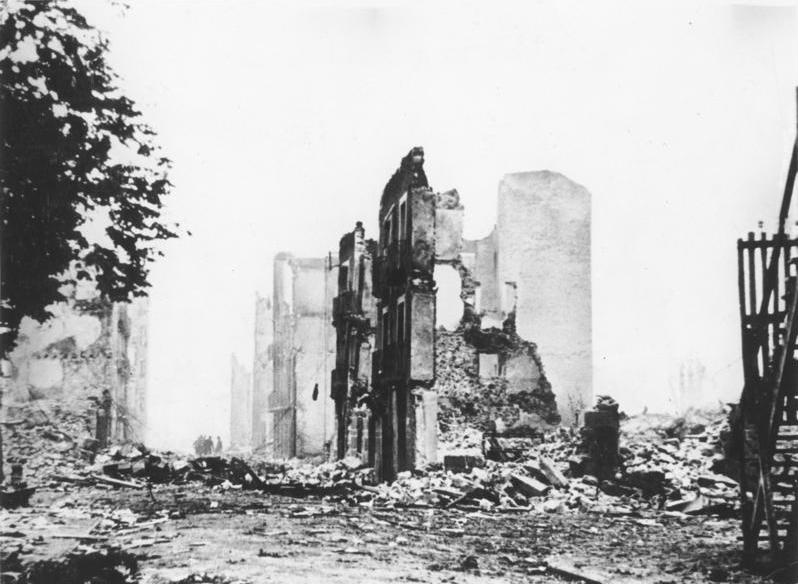
Gernika in ruins after the 1937 aerial bombing by Adolf Hitler's Condor Legion and Benito Mussolini's Aviazione Legionaria

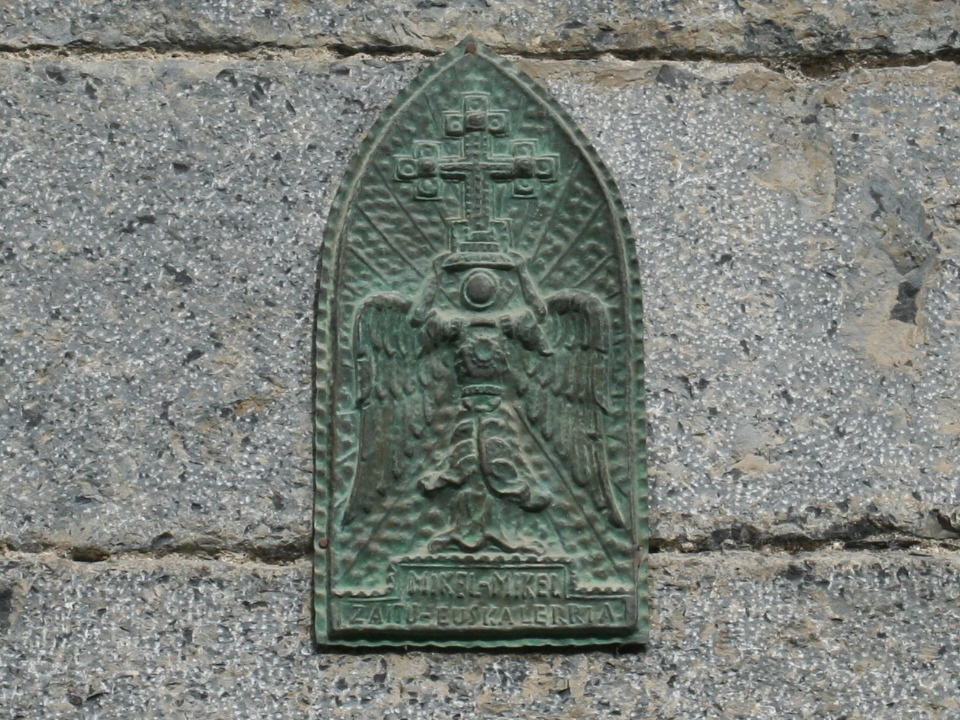
Traditionalist plaque at Leitza in honour of Saint Michael, a Basque patron saint

=== Wartime ===
In July 1936, a military uprising erupted across Spain, in the face of which Basque nationalists in Biscay and Gipuzkoa sided with the Spanish republicans, but many in Navarre, a Carlist stronghold, supported General Francisco Franco's insurgent forces. (The latter were known in Spain as "Nacionales"—usually rendered in English as "Nationalists"—which can be highly misleading in the Basque context). However, Navarre especially was not spared. As soon as the rebels led by General Mola made themselves strong in the district, they initiated a terror campaign against blacklisted individuals aimed at purging the rearguard and breaking any glimmer of dissent. The confirmed death toll rose to 2,857, plus a further 305 in prison (malnutrition, ill-treatment, etc.); victims and historic memory associations raise the figure to near 4,000.

Another big atrocity of this war, immortalised by Picasso's emblematic mural, was the April 1937 aerial bombing of Gernika, a Biscayne town of great historical and symbolic importance, by Adolf Hitler's Condor Legion and Benito Mussolini's Aviazione Legionaria at Franco's bidding. In August 1937, the Eusko Gudarostea, the troops of the new government of the Basque Autonomous Community surrendered to Franco's fascist Italian allies in Santoña on condition that the lives of the Basque soldiers were respected (Santoña Agreement). Basques (Gipuzkoa, Biscay) fled for their lives to exile by the tens of thousands, including a mass evacuation of children aboard chartered boats (the niños de la guerra) into permanent exile. France took c. 20,000 children, Belgium 5,000, United Kingdom took 4,000, Switzerland took 800, Mexico took 455 and Denmark took 100 evacuee children. 2,895 children went to the Soviet Union and became known as Niños de Rusia (Children of Russia), becoming political pawns over the next 20 years.

With the Spanish Civil War over, the new dictator began his drive to turn Spain into a totalitarian nation state. Franco's regime passed harsh laws against all minorities in the Spanish state, including Basques, aimed at wiping out their cultures and languages. Calling Biscay and Gipuzkoa "traitor provinces", he abolished what remained of their autonomy. Navarre and Álava were allowed to hang onto a small local police force and limited tax prerogatives.

After 1937, the Basque territories remained behind the war lines, but the French Basque Country became a forced destination for fellow Basques from Spain fleeing war, only to find themselves confined in prisoner camps, such as Gurs on the outer fringes of Soule (Basses Pyrenees). The Armistice of 22 June 1940 established a German military occupation of the French Atlantic, including the French Basque Country up to Saint-Jean-Pied-de-Port, with the rest of it being falling on the Vichy France. The whole western and central Pyrenees became a hotspot for clandestine operations and organized resistance, e.g. Comet line.

=== Franco's dictatorship ===
Two developments during the Franco dictatorship (1939–1975) deeply affected life in the Basque Country in this period and afterward. One was a new wave of immigration from the poorer parts of Spain to Biscay and Gipuzkoa during the 1950s, 1960s and 1970s in response to the region's escalating industrialization aimed to supply the Spanish internal market as a result of a post-war self-sufficiency policy, favoured by the regime.

Secondly, the regime's persecution provoked a strong backlash in the Basque Country from the 1960s onwards, notably in the form of a new political movement, Basque Country And Freedom (Euskadi Ta Askatasuna), better known by its Basque initials ETA, who turned to the systematic use of arms as a form of protest in 1968. But ETA was only one component of a social, political and language movement rejecting Spanish domination but also sharply criticizing the inertia of the Basque Country's own conservative nationalists (organized in the PNV). To this day the dialectic between these two political trends, the Abertzale (patriotic or nationalist) Left and the PNV, dominate the nationalist part of the Basque political spectrum, the rest of which is occupied by non-nationalist parties.

Following the monarchy tradition, Francisco Franco spent the summers between 1941 and 1975 at the Ayete Palace of San Sebastián.

== Present ==
1978 SPANISH CONSTITUTION REFERENDUM
	BAC	Navarre	Spain overall
YES (% total votes)	70.24%	76.42%	88.54%
NO (% total votes)	23.92%	17.11%	7.89%
ABSTENTION (% reg. voters)	55.30%	32.80%	32.00%

Franco's authoritarian regime continued until 1975, while the latest years running up to the dictator's death proved harsh in a Basque Country shaken by repression, turmoil and unrest. Two new stances arose in Basque politics, namely break or compromise. While ETA's different branches decided to keep confrontation to gain a new status for the Basque Country, PNV and the Spanish Communists and Socialists opted for negotiations with the Francoist regime. In 1978, a general pardon was decreed by the Spanish Government for all politics related offences, a decision affecting directly Basque nationalist activists, especially ETA militants. In the same year, the referendum to ratify the Spanish Constitution was held. The electoral platforms closer to ETA's two branches (Herri Batasuna, EIA) advocated for a "No" option, while PNV called for abstention on the grounds that it had no Basque input. The results in the Southern Basque Country showed a conspicuous gap with other regions in Spain, especially in the Basque Autonomous Community.

In the 1970s and early/mid-1980s, the Basque Country was gripped by intense violence practised by Basque nationalist and state-sponsored illegal groups and police forces. Between 1979 and 1983, in the framework of the new Spanish Constitution, the central government granted wide self-governing powers ("autonomy") to Álava, Biscay, and Gipuzkoa after a referendum on a Basque statute, including its own elected parliament, police force, school system, and control over taxation, while Navarre was left out of the new autonomous region after the Socialists backed down on their initial position, and it was made into a separate autonomous region. Thereafter, despite the difficulties facing, with overt long-time institutional and academic hostility in the French Basque Country and Navarre, Basque language education has grown to become a key actor in formal education at all levels.

The political events were accompanied by a collapse in the manufacturing industry in the Southern Basque Country following the 1973 and 1979 crises. The marked decay of the 1970s put an end to the baby boom and halted the internal Spanish immigration trend started in the postwar years. The crisis left the newly established Basque autonomous government from Vitoria-Gasteiz (led initially by Carlos Garaikoetxea) facing a major strategic challenge related to the dismantling of the traditional shipbuilding and steel industry now subject to open international competition. Economic confidence was largely restored during the mid-1990s when the autonomous government's bet on modernization of manufacturing, R+D based specialization, and quality tourism started to bear fruit, counting on flowing credit from local savings banks. Cross-border synergies between the French and Spanish side of the Basque Country have confirmed the territory as an attractive tourist destination.

The 1979 Statute of Autonomy is an organic law of mandatory implementation, but powers have been devolved gradually over decades as a result of re-negotiations between the Spanish and successive Basque regional governments according to after-electoral needs, while the transfer of many powers is still due. In January 2017, the first common administrative institution ever was established in the French Basque Country, the Basque Municipal Community presided over by the mayor of Bayonne Jean-René Etchegaray and considered a 'historic' event by the representatives.

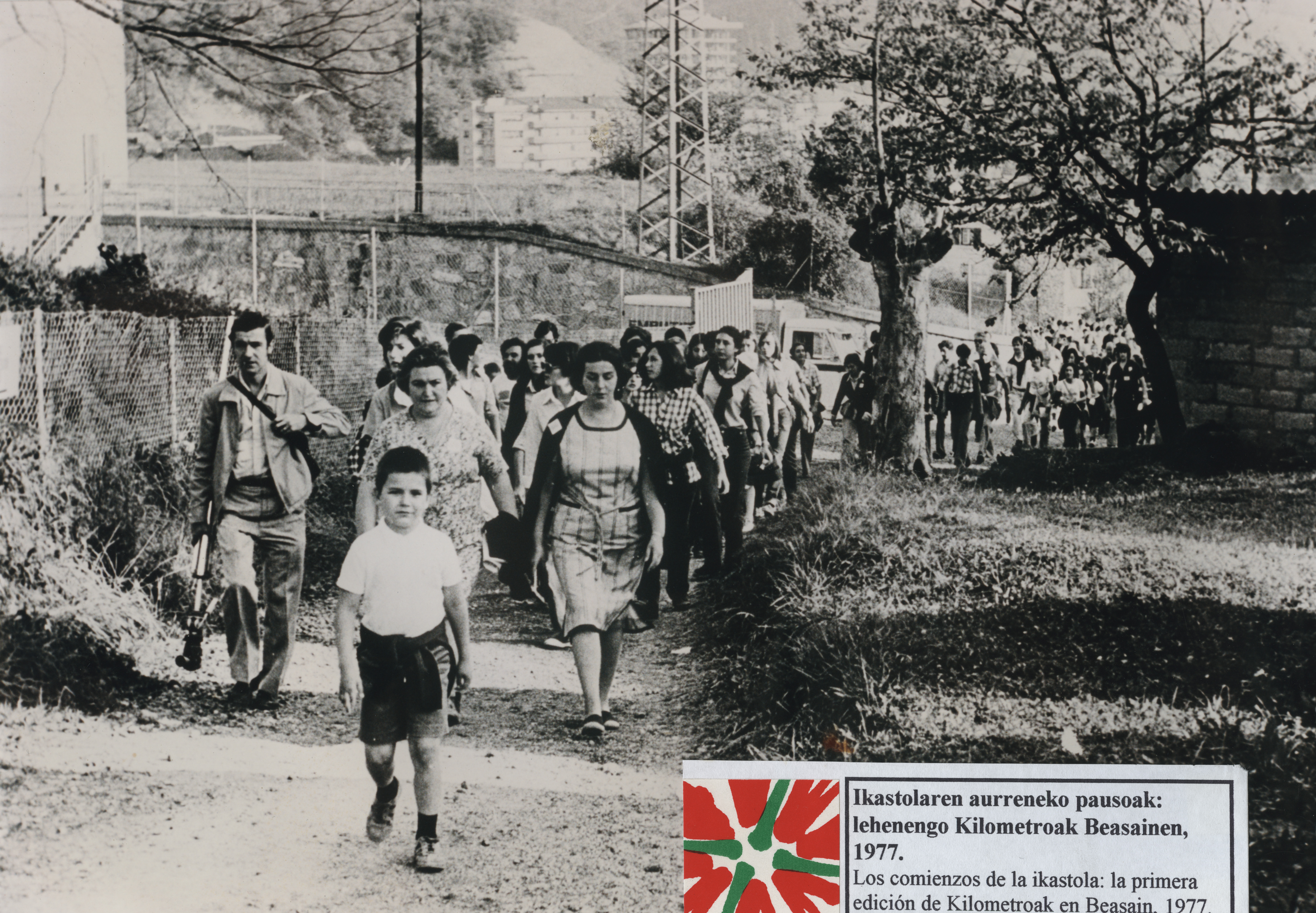
First edition of the Kilometroak festival in support of the ikastolas (Beasain, 1977)

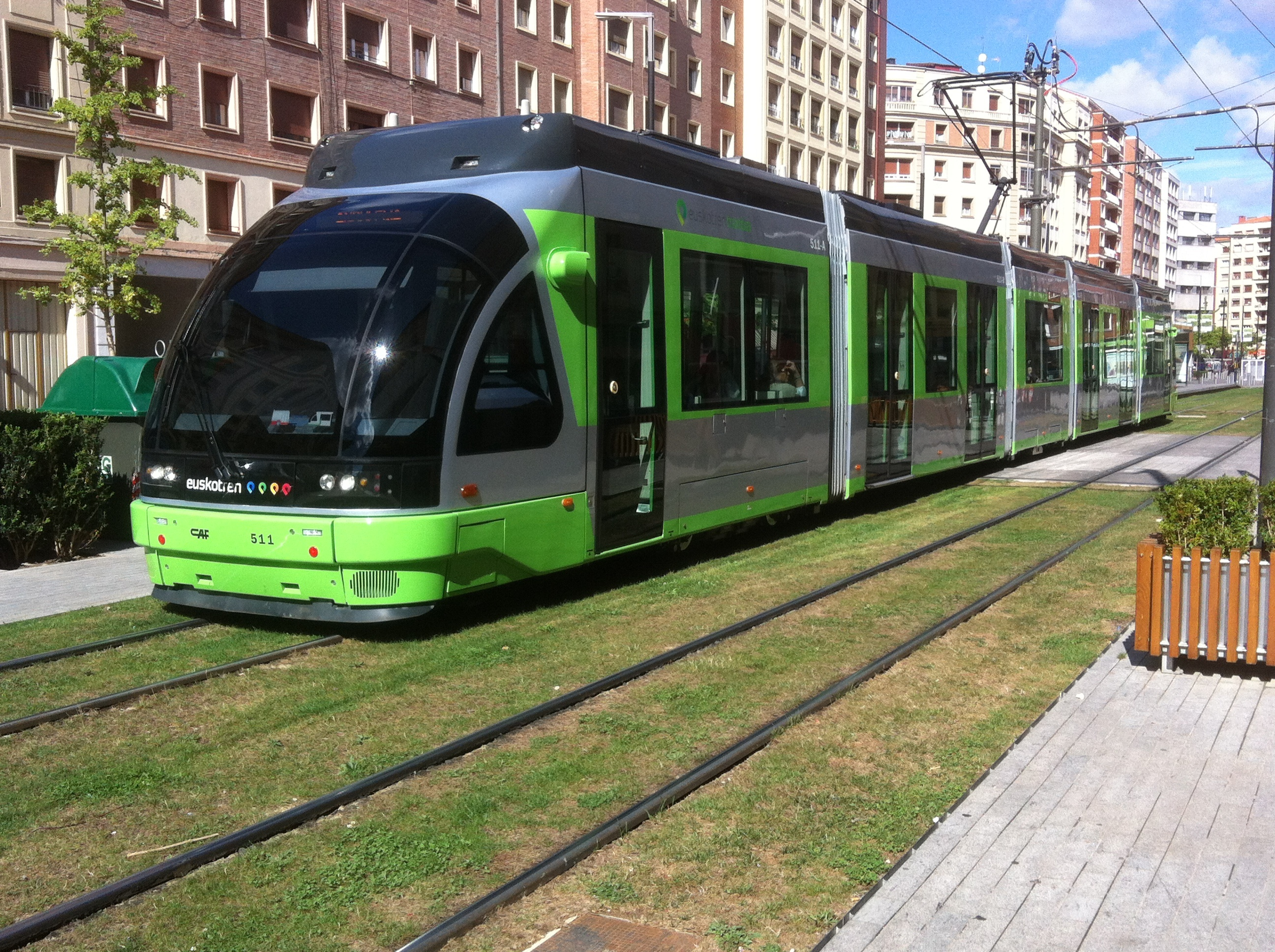
CAF Tram in Vitoria-Gasteiz (Euskotren Tranbia)

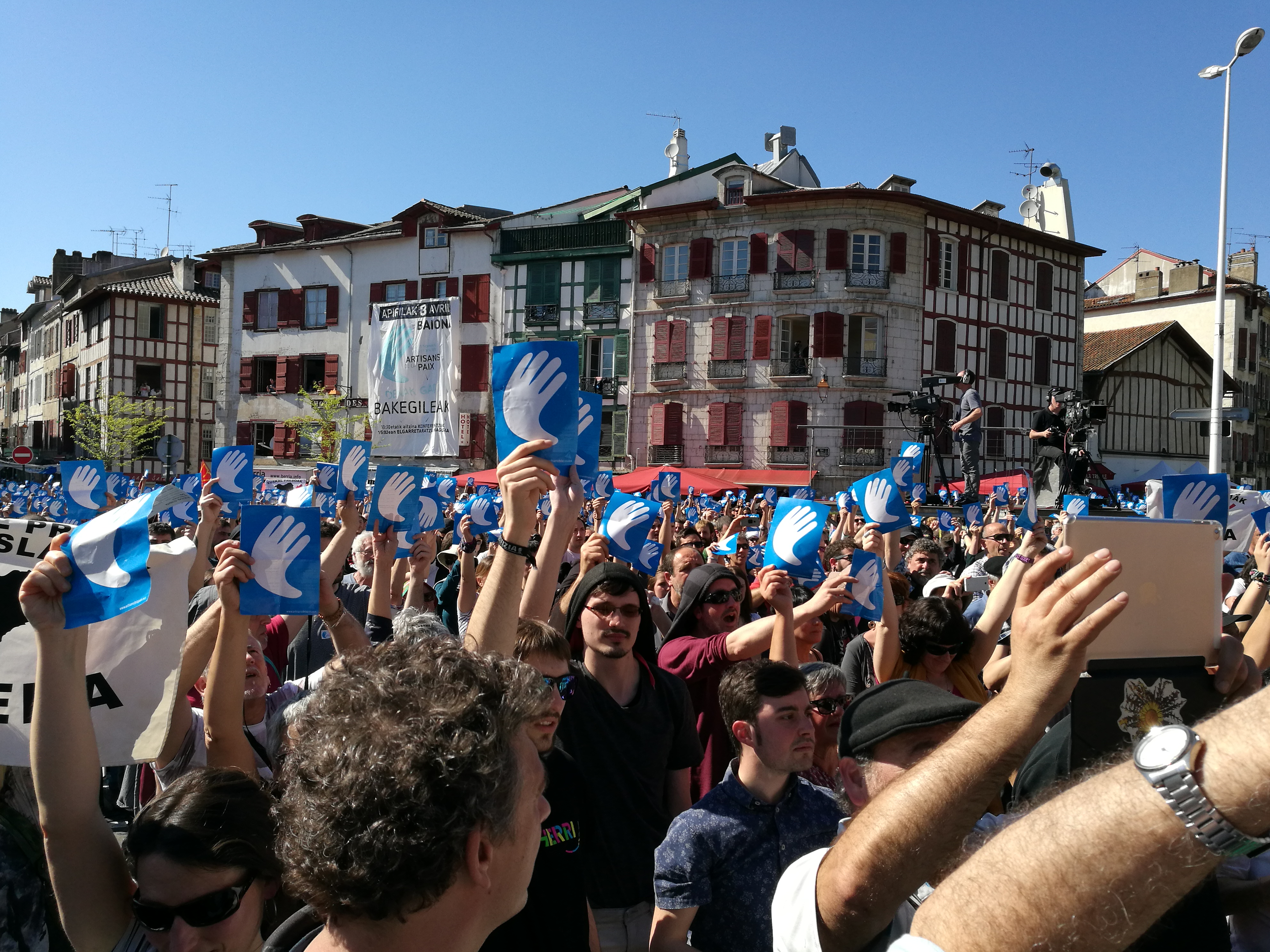
Pro-peace rally in Bayonne on ETA's disarmament day (08/04/2017)

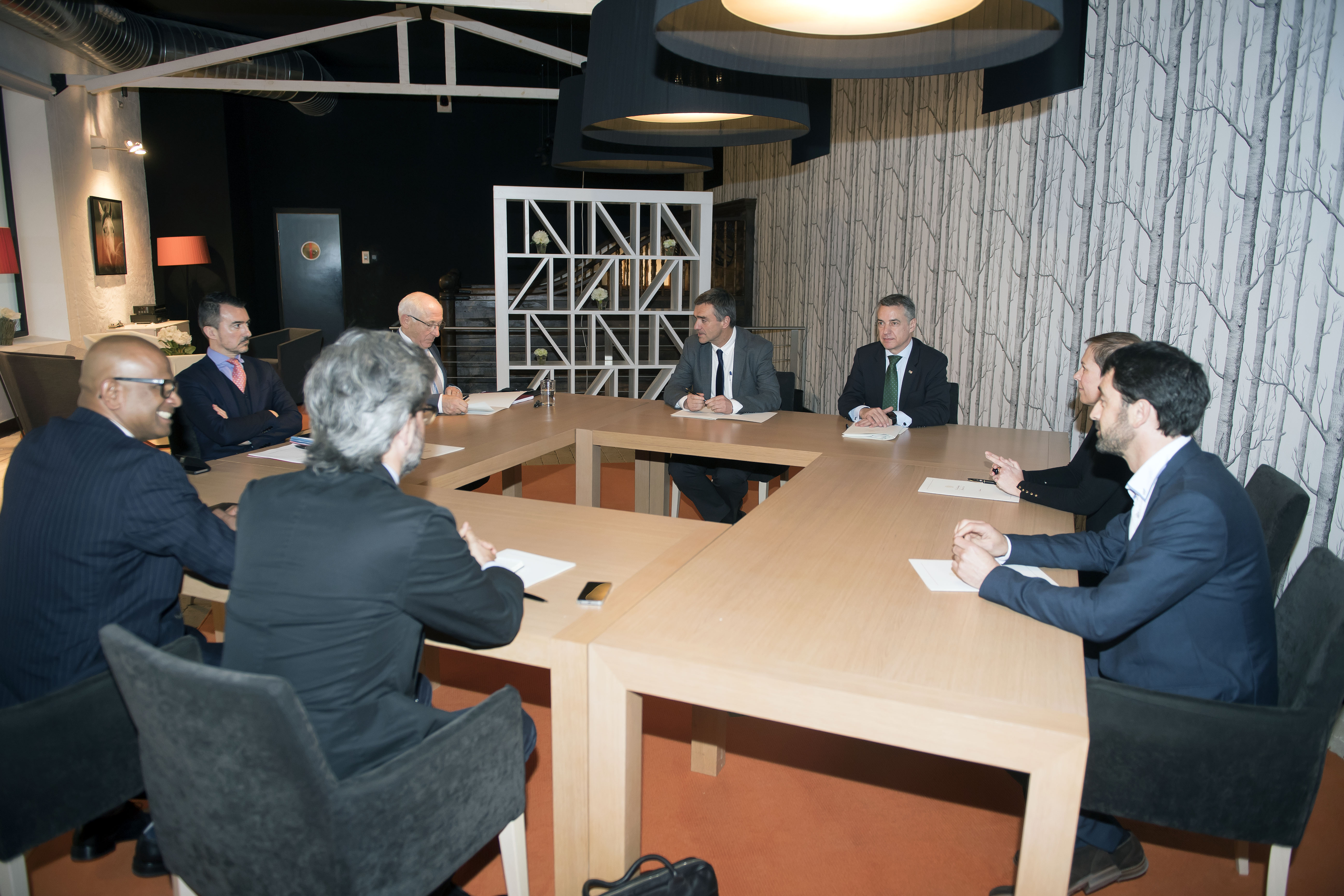
Tripartite meeting of the three main Basque institutional representatives with peace broker Ram Manikkalingam

== See also ==
- Basques
- Basque language
- Basque Country
- Basque Autonomous Community
- Navarre
- Vineyards of the Basque Country

== Bibliography ==
- "Auñamendi Eusko Entziklopedia". Auñamendi Eusko Entziklopedia. EuskoMedia Fundazioa.
- Campbell, Craig S. (1987). "The Century of the Basques: Their Influence in the Geography of the 1500s". Lurralde. Ingeba.
- Cavalli-Sforza, Luigi Luca (1 June 2000). Genes, Pueblos y Lenguas. Editorial Critica. ISBN 978-84-8432-084-5.
- Cavalli-Sforza, Luigi Luca. "European Genetic Variation". Online maps. Archived from the original on 5 December 2006.
- Collins, Roger (1990a). The Basques (2nd ed.). Oxford, UK: Basil Blackwell. ISBN 0631175652.
- Collins, Roger (1990b). Early Medieval Spain: Unity in Diversity, 400–1000. Macmillan.
- Douglass, William A.; Bilbao, Jon (2005) [1975]. Amerikanuak: Basques in the New World. Reno, Nev.: University of Nevada Press. ISBN 0-87417-625-5.
- Esparza Zabalegi, Jose Mari (2012). Euskal Herria Kartografian eta Testigantza Historikoetan. Euskal Editorea SL. ISBN 978-84-936037-9-3.
- Jimeno Jurio, Jose Maria (1995). Historia de Pamplona y de sus Lenguas. Tafalla: Txalaparta. ISBN 84-8136-017-1.
- Kamen, Henry (2001). Philip V of Spain: The King who Reigned Twice. Yale University Press. ISBN 0-30008-718-7.
- Kurlansky, Mark (11 March 2011). Basque History Of The World. Knopf Canada. ISBN 978-0-307-36978-9.
- Larrea, Juan José; Bonnassie, Pierre (1998). La Navarre du IVe au XIIe siècle: peuplement et société. De Boeck Université.
- Lewis, Archibald R. (1965). The Development of Southern French and Catalan Society, 718–1050. Austin: University of Texas Press.
- López-Morell, Migule Á. (2015). Rothschild; Una historia de poder e influencia en España. Madrid: MARCIAL PONS, EDICIONES DE HISTORIA, S.A. ISBN 978-84-15963-59-2.
- Oroz Arizcuren, Francisco J. (1990). "Miscelania Hispánica". Pueblos, lengua y escrituras en la Hispania prerromana. Salamanca, Spain: Salamanca UP.
- Preston, Paul (2013). The Spanish Holocaust: Inquisition and Extermination in Twentieth-Century Spain. London, UK: HarperCollins. ISBN 978-0-00-638695-7.
- Portilla, Micaela (1991). Una Ruta Europea; Por Álava, a Compostela; Del Paso de San Adrián, al Ebro. Vitoria: Diputación Foral de Álava / Arabako Foru Aldundia. ISBN 84-7821-066-0.
- Sorauren, Mikel (1998). Historia de Navarre, el Estado Vasco (2nd ed.). Pamiela. ISBN 84-7681-299-X.
- Urzainqui, T.; Olaizola, J.M. (1998). La Navarra Marítima. Pamiela. ISBN 84-7681-293-0.
- Urzainqui, Tomas; Esarte, Pello; García Manzanal, Alberto; Sagredo, Iñaki; Sagredo, Iñaki; Sagredo, Iñaki; Del Castillo, Eneko; Monjo, Emilio; Ruiz de Pablos, Francisco; Guerra Viscarret, Pello; Lartiga, Halip; Lavin, Josu; Ercilla, Manuel (2013). La Conquista de Navarra y la Reforma Europea. Pamplona-Iruña: Pamiela. ISBN 978-84-7681-803-9.
- Watson, Cameron (2003). Modern Basque History: Eighteenth Century to the Present. University of Nevada, Center for Basque Studies. ISBN 1-877802-16-6.
