= 1626 Potosí flood =

Flooding disaster in Potosí, present-day Bolivia

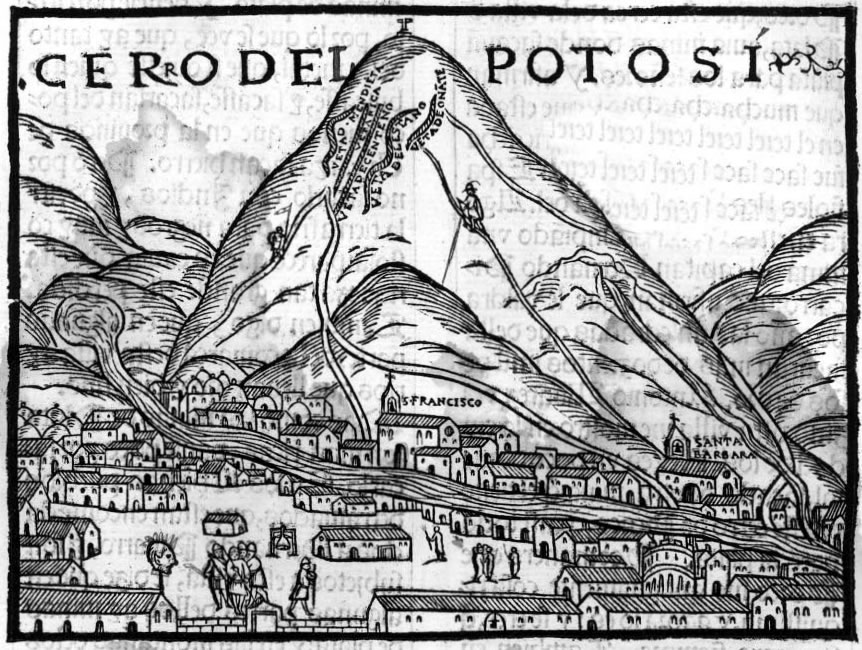
Cerro Rico del Potosí, the first image of Potosi in Europe. Pedro Cieza de León, 1553

The 1626 Potosí flood was a major disaster in Charcas (present-day Bolivia) that led to estimates of 2,000 or 4,000 human deaths. On March 15, 1626, the San Ildefonso Dam burst causing a flood in the city of Potosí that destroyed many silver ore-processing plants (ingenios) and led to massive economical losses and environmental damages. Some interpreted the catastrophe as a divine punishment for past episodes of violence such as the 1622–1625 War of the Vicuñas and Basques. There are reports that more than half of the ingenios were destroyed. As silver ore in Potosí was extracted in a process that required mercury by one estimate 19.3 tons of the element, at concentrations of 48 mg/l Hg, were washed away by the flood. Reconstruction after the flood went fast and ten years later, by 1636, there were more ingenios than before the flood. The flood is in hindsight seen by some historians as the beginning of a century-long period of decline of Potosí.

== See also ==
- 1965 Valparaíso earthquake and the El Cobre dam failures
- Floods in Bolivia
- Mercury poisoning
- Pallaqueo
