= War of the Vicuñas and Basques =

War between Basques and other Spaniards in colonial Bolivia (1622–1625)

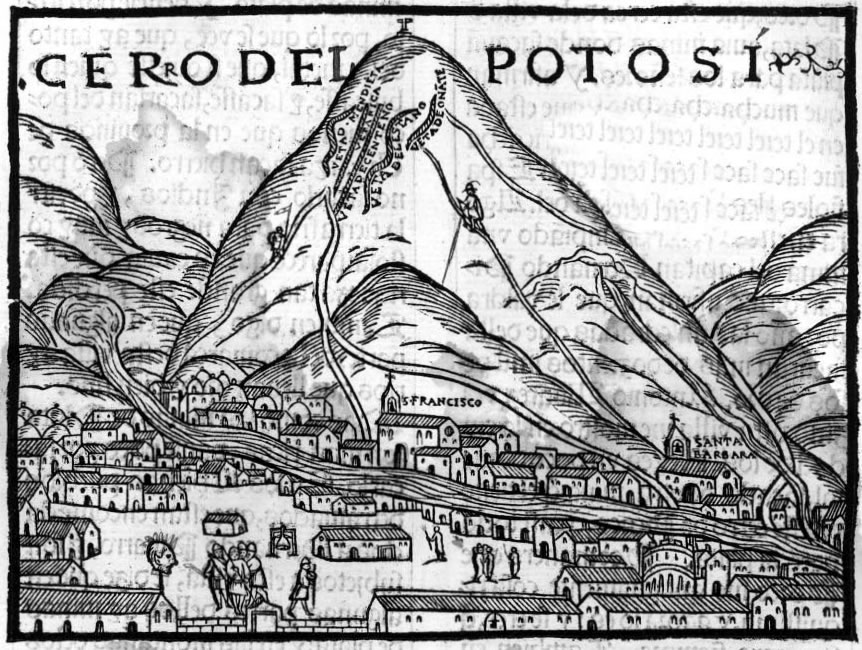
Date	June 1622-March 1625
Location	Charcas Province, Peru
Result	Inconclusive

Belligerents
Vicuñas; Creole people; Mestizo; Indigenous Peruvians; Castilians; Andalusians; Extremadurans	Basques

Commanders and leaders
Antonio Xeldres; Castillo	Francisco Oyanume

Casualties and losses
64 killed 40 executed	Unknown

The War of the Vicuñas and Basques (Spanish: Guerra de Vicuñas y Vascongados), or sometimes just Vicuña War, was an armed conflict in Charcas Province, present-day Bolivia, that lasted between June 1622 and March 1625, fought between Basques and "Vicuñas" (an informal term for non-Basque Spaniards in Upper Peru, a name obtained through the habit of wearing hats made of vicuña skins).

Competition over the control of the silver mines in Potosí, Lípez and Chichas surged in the early 17th century, pitting Basques and Vicuñas against each other. The Vicuñas had initially employed legal and political measures attempting to block the Basque attempts to monopolize control over the cabildo (municipal government) of Potosí and the silver mining sector. However, these efforts did not yield results. Violent incidents began in 1615, and escalated in 1622 following the assassination of a Basque on a street in Potosí.

The Vicuñas were led by Antonio Xeldres. The creole, Mestizo and indigenous populations largely sided with the Vicuñas. The Vicuñas themselves were not always unified, though, as they suffered from internal feuds between Andalusians on one hand and New Castilians and Extremadurans on the other (the former group eventually withdrew from the rebellion).

The war pitted different sectors of the viceregal administration against each other, as some supported the Basque claims for hegemony whilst others had a conciliatory approach to the Vicuña rebels. Personalities involved in the conflict included the president and oidores of the Royal Audiencia of Charcas, treasury officials and the corregidor of Potosí and the visitador (sent to the area in order to audit fiscal accounts).

The Vicuña rebels had killed 64 men by March 1624. However, the Basque control over the city and the mines had not been broken. Basque leaders pleaded to the King of Spain, Philip IV, to intervene. The King in return ordered the Viceroy of Peru to act decisively against the Vicuñas. Between 1624 and 1625, the viceregal authorities managed to capture several key Vicuña leaders, executing forty of them.

The war would last for three years. The war did not end in any decisive victory for any side, but rather as a result of mutual exhaustion. An agreement to end hostilities was reached. The marriage between the children of two of the leaders of the opposing camps, the son of the Basque leader Francisco Oyanume and the daughter of the Vicuña general Castillo, was part of the settlement of the conflict. In April 1625, a royal decree was issued, pardoning all Vicuñas fighters except those having committed blood crimes. Some Vicuñas continued acts of banditry in the following years, but without the ethnic or political overtones as during the war with the Basques. Basque-Vicuña rivalry did, however, continue for a century.

On March 15, 1626, the ingenios of Potosí were destroyed by massive flooding. This event was interpreted as a divine punishment for the past violences.

Later histiography has sought to emphasize the socio-economic contradictions as catalysts for the war, framing it as class warfare.
