= Lipez =

Lipez or Lípez may refer to:

== Geography ==
- Cerro Lípez, stratovolcano in Bolivia
- Cordillera de Lípez, mountain range in southwestern Bolivia
- Nor Lípez Native Community Lands, indigenous territory in Bolivia
- Nor Lípez Province, province in Bolivia
- Río Grande de Lipez, river of Bolivia
- San Pablo de Lípez, town in Bolivia
- Sur Lípez Province, province in Bolivia

== People ==
- Kermit Lipez (born 1941), United States Circuit Judge
- Richard Lipez (1938–2022), American journalist and writer
