= Politics of Spain =

Politics of Spain Política de España (Spanish) Política d'Espanya (Catalan) Espainiako politika (Basque) Política de España (Galician)
- Coat of arms of Spain
- Polity type: Unitary parliamentary constitutional monarchy
- Constitution: Constitution of Spain

Legislative branch
- Name: General Courts
- Type: Bicameral
- Meeting place: Palace of the Senate; Palace of the Courts
- Upper house
- Name: Senate
- Presiding officer: Pedro Rollán, President of the Senate
- Lower house
- Name: Congress of Deputies
- Presiding officer: Francina Armengol, President of the Congress of Deputies

Executive branch
- Head of state
- Title: Monarch
- Currently: Felipe VI
- Appointer: Hereditary
- Head of government
- Title: Prime Minister
- Currently: Pedro Sánchez
- Appointer: Monarch
- Cabinet
- Name: Council of Ministers
- Current cabinet: Sánchez III Government
- Leader: Prime Minister
- Deputy leader: First Deputy Prime Minister
- Appointer: Monarch
- Headquarters: Palace of Moncloa

Judicial branch
- Name: Judiciary of Spain
- Courts: High Courts of Justice
- Supreme Court
- Chief judge: Vicente Guilarte (acting)
- Seat: Convent of the Salesas Reales
- National Court
- Chief judge: José Ramón Navarro

The politics of Spain takes place under the framework established by the Constitution of 1978. Spain is established as a social and democratic sovereign country wherein the national sovereignty is vested in the people, from which the powers of the state emanate.

The form of government in Spain is a parliamentary monarchy, that is, a social representative democratic constitutional monarchy in which the monarch is the head of state, while the prime minister—whose official title is "President of the Government"—is the head of government. Executive power is exercised by the Government, which is made up of the prime minister, the deputy prime ministers and other ministers, which collectively form the Cabinet, or Council of Ministers. Legislative power is vested in the Cortes Generales (General Courts), a bicameral parliament constituted by the Congress of Deputies and the Senate. The judiciary is independent of the executive and the legislature, administering justice on behalf of the King by judges and magistrates. The Supreme Court of Spain is the highest court in the nation, with jurisdiction in all Spanish territories, superior to all in all affairs except constitutional matters, which are the jurisdiction of a separate court, the Constitutional Court.

Spain's political system is a multi-party system, but since the 1990s two parties have been predominant in politics, the Spanish Socialist Workers' Party (PSOE) and the People's Party (PP). Regional parties, mainly the Basque Nationalist Party (EAJ-PNV), from the Basque Country, and Convergence and Union (CiU) and the Republican Left of Catalonia (ERC), from Catalonia, have also played key roles in Spanish politics. Members of the Congress of Deputies are selected through proportional representation, and the government is formed by the party or coalition that has the confidence of the Congress, usually the party with the largest number of seats. Since the Spanish transition to democracy, when parties failed to obtain absolute majorities, the tendency was to form minority governments. However, this tendency was broken in 2020 with the formation of the Second government of Pedro Sánchez, formed by members of the Spanish Socialist Workers' Party and Unidas Podemos, as well as independents proposed by both parties. This was the first nationwide coalition government to be formed in Spain since the Second Spanish Republic.

Regional government functions under a system known as state of autonomies, a highly decentralized system of administration (systematically ranked 2nd in the world after Germany at the Regional Authority Index, since 1998). Initially framed as a kind of "asymmetrical federalism" for the regions styled as "historic nationalities", it rapidly evolved into the creation of regions throughout Spain and the devolution of powers to all, widely known as "coffee for everyone". Exercising the right to self-government granted by the constitution, the "nationalities and regions" have been constituted as 17 autonomous communities and two autonomous cities. The form of government of each autonomous community and autonomous city is also based on a parliamentary system, in which executive power is vested in a "president" and a Council of Ministers, elected by and responsible to a unicameral legislative assembly.

The Economist Intelligence Unit downgraded Spain from full democracy to "flawed democracy" in 2022, because of concerns about its judicial independence, given the "political divisions over the appointment of new magistrates to the General Council of the Judiciary (CGPJ)". Spain returned to the label of full democracy in 2023.

According to the V-Dem Democracy indices, in 2026 Spain was the 19th most electorally democratic country in the world.

== The Crown ==
=== The King and his functions ===
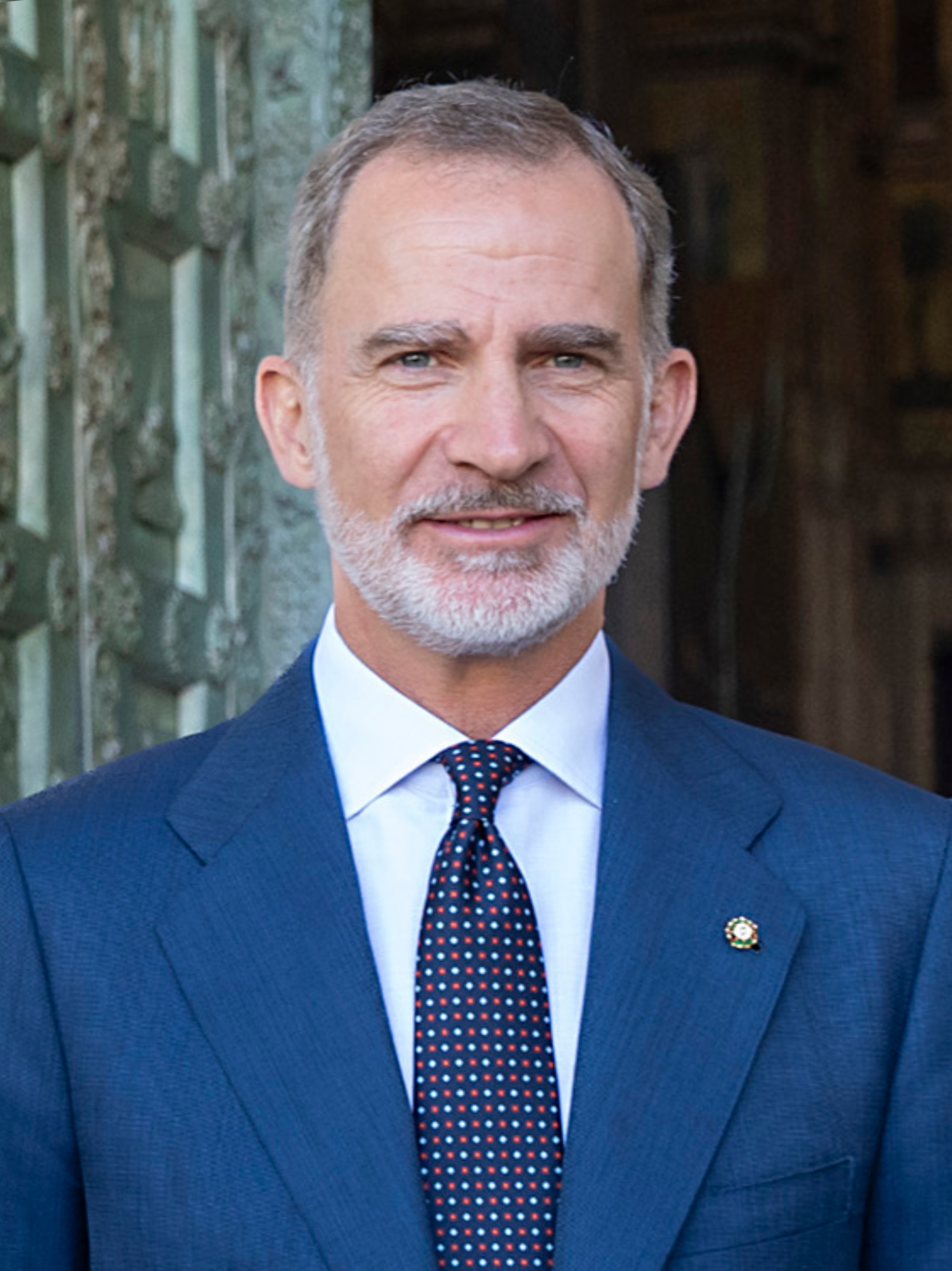
King Felipe VI of Spain

The Spanish monarch, currently, Felipe VI, is the head of the Spanish State, symbol of its unity and permanence, who arbitrates and moderates the regular function of government institutions, and assumes the highest representation of Spain in international relations, especially with those who are part of its historical community. His title is King of Spain, although he can use all other titles of the Crown. The Crown, as a symbol of the nation's unity, has a two-fold function. First, it represents the unity of the State in the organic separation of powers; hence he appoints the prime ministers and summons and dissolves the Parliament, among other responsibilities. Secondly, it represents the Spanish State as a whole in relation to the autonomous communities, whose rights he is constitutionally bound to respect.

The King is proclaimed by the Cortes Generales – the Parliament – and must take an oath to carry out his duties faithfully, to obey the constitution and all laws and to ensure they are obeyed, and to respect the rights of the citizens, as well as the rights of the autonomous communities.

According to the Constitution of Spain, it is incumbent upon the King: to sanction and promulgate laws; to summon and dissolve the Cortes Generales (the Parliament) and to call elections; to call a referendum under the circumstances provided in the constitution; to propose a candidate for prime minister, and to appoint or remove him from office, as well as other ministers; to issue the decrees agreed upon by the Council of Ministers; to confer civil and military positions, and to award honors and distinctions; to be informed of the affairs of the State, presiding over the meetings of the Council of Ministers whenever opportune; to exercise supreme command of the Spanish Armed Forces, to exercise the right to grant pardons, in accordance to the law; and to exercise the High Patronage of the Royal Academies. All ambassadors and other diplomatic representatives are accredited by him, and foreign representatives in Spain are accredited to him. He also expresses the State's assent to entering into international commitments through treaties; and he declares war or makes peace, following the authorization of the Cortes Generales.

In practical terms, his duties are mostly ceremonial, and constitutional provisions are worded in such a way as to make clear the strict neutral and apolitical nature of his role. In fact, the Fathers of the Constitution made careful use of the expressions "it is incumbent upon of the King", deliberately omitting other expressions such as "powers", "faculties" or "competences", thus eliminating any notion of monarchical prerogatives within the parliamentary monarchy. In the same way, the King does not have supreme liberty in the exercise of the aforementioned functions; all of these are framed, limited or exercised "according to the constitution and laws", or following requests of the executive or authorizations of the legislature.

The king is the commander-in-chief of the Spanish Armed Forces, but has only symbolic, rather than actual, authority over the Spanish military. Nonetheless, the king's function as the commander-in-chief and symbol of national unity have been exercised, most notably in the military coup of 23 February 1981, where King Juan Carlos I addressed the country on national television in military uniform, denouncing the coup and urging the maintenance of the law and the continuance of the democratically elected government, thus defusing the uprising.

=== Succession line ===
The Spanish Constitution, promulgated in 1978, established explicitly that Juan Carlos I is the legitimate heir of the historical dynasty. This statement served two purposes. First, it established that the position of the King emanates from the constitution, the source from which its existence is legitimized democratically. Secondly, it reaffirmed the dynastic legitimacy of the person of Juan Carlos I, not so much to end old historical dynastic struggles – namely those historically embraced by the Carlist movement – but as a consequence of the renunciation to all rights of succession that his father, Juan de Borbón y Battenberg, made in 1977. Juan Carlos I was constitutional king of Spain from 1978 to 2014. He abdicated in favor of his son Felipe VI.

The constitution also establishes that the monarchy is hereditary following a "regular order of primogeniture and representation: earlier line shall precede older; within the same line, closer degree shall precede more distant; within the same degree, male shall precede female; and within the same sex, older shall precede the younger". What this means in practice, is that the Crown is passed to the firstborn, who would have preference over his siblings and cousins; women can only accede to the throne provided they do not have any older or younger brothers; and finally "regular order of representation" means that grandchildren have preference over the deceased King's parents, uncles or siblings. Finally, if all possible rightful orders of primogeniture and representation have been exhausted, then the General Courts will select a successor in the way that best suits the interest of Spain. The heir presumptive or heir apparent holds the title of Prince or Princess of Asturias. The current heir presumptive is princess Leonor de Borbón.

== Legislature ==
Legislative power is vested in the Spanish Parliament, the Cortes Generales (literally "General Courts", but rarely translated as such). "Cortes" has been the historical and constitutional name used since Medieval Times. The qualifier "General", added in the Constitution of 1978, implies the nationwide character of the Parliament, since the legislatures of some autonomous communities are also labeled "Cortes". The Cortes Generales are the supreme representatives of the Spanish people. This legislature is bicameral, made up of the Congress of Deputies (Spanish: Congreso de los Diputados) and the Senate (Spanish: Senado). The General Courts exercise the legislative power of the State, approving the budget and controlling the actions of the government. As in most parliamentary systems, more legislative power is vested in the lower chamber, the Congress of the Deputies. The Speaker of Congress, known as "president of the Congress of Deputies" presides a joint-session of the Cortes Generales.

Each chamber of the Cortes Generales meets at separate precincts, and carry out their duties separately, except for specific important functions, in which case they meet in a joint session. Such functions include the elaboration of laws proposed by the executive ("the Government"), by one of the chambers, by an autonomous community, or through popular initiative; and the approval or amendment of the nation's budget proposed by the prime minister.

=== The Congress of Deputies ===
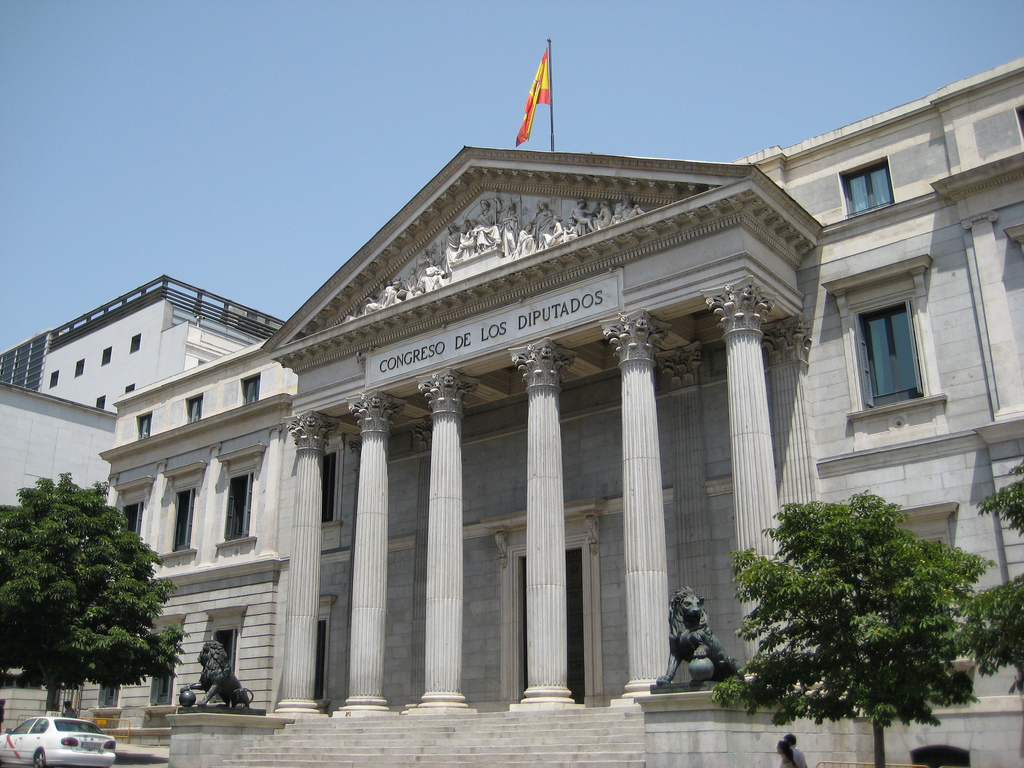
Façade of the Palace of the Cortes, seat of the Congress of Deputies

The Congress of Deputies is made up of a minimum of 300 and a maximum of 400 deputies (members of parliament) – currently 350 – elected by universal, free, equal, direct and secret suffrage, to four-year terms or until the dissolution of the Cortes Generales. The voting system used is that of proportional representation with closed party lists following D'Hondt method in which the province forms the constituency or electoral circumscription and must be assigned a minimum of 2 deputies; the autonomous cities of Ceuta and Melilla, are each assigned one deputy.

The Congress of Deputies can initiate legislation, and they also have the power to ratify or reject the decree laws adopted by the executive. They also elect, via a vote of investiture, the prime minister (the "president of the Government"), before being formally sworn to office by the King. The Congress of Deputies may adopt a motion of censure whereby it can vote out the prime minister by absolute majority. On the other hand, the prime minister may request at any time a vote of confidence from the Congress of Deputies. If the prime minister fails to obtain it, then the Cortes Generales are dissolved, and new elections are called.

=== Senate ===
The upper chamber is the Senate. It is nominally the chamber of territorial representation. Four senators are elected for each province, with the exception of the insular provinces, in which the number of senator varies: three senators are elected for each of the three major islands – Gran Canaria, Mallorca and Tenerife – and one senator for Ibiza-Formentera, Menorca, Fuerteventura, La Gomera, El Hierro, Lanzarote and La Palma. The autonomous cities of Ceuta and Melilla each elect two senators.

In addition, the legislative assembly of each autonomous community designates one senator, and another for each one million inhabitants. This designation must follow proportional representation. For the 2011 elections, this system allowed for 266 senators, 208 of which were elected and 58 of which were designated by the autonomous communities. Senators serve for four-year terms or until the dissolution of the Cortes Generales. Even though the constitution explicitly refers to the Senate as the chamber of territorial representation, as seen from the numbers before, only one-fifth of the senators actually represent the autonomous communities. Since the constitution allowed for the creation of autonomous communities, but the process itself was embryonic in nature – they were formed after the promulgation of the constitution, and the outcome was unpredictable – the constituent assembly chose the province as the basis for territorial representation.

The Senate has less power than the Congress of Deputies: it can veto legislation, but its veto can be overturned by an absolute majority of the Congress of Deputies. Its only exclusive power concerns the autonomous communities, thus in a way performing a function in line with its nature of "territorial representation". By an overall majority, the Senate is the institution that authorizes the Government to adopt measures to enforce an autonomous community's compliance with its constitutional duties when it has failed to do so.

For the first time ever, on Friday, 27 October 2017, the senate voted, by majority, to invoke article 155 of the constitution, which gave the central government the power to remove the government of the autonomous region of Cataluña for acting against the constitution of 1978 by having called an illegal referendum on 1 October.

== Executive ==
=== The Government and the Council of Ministers ===
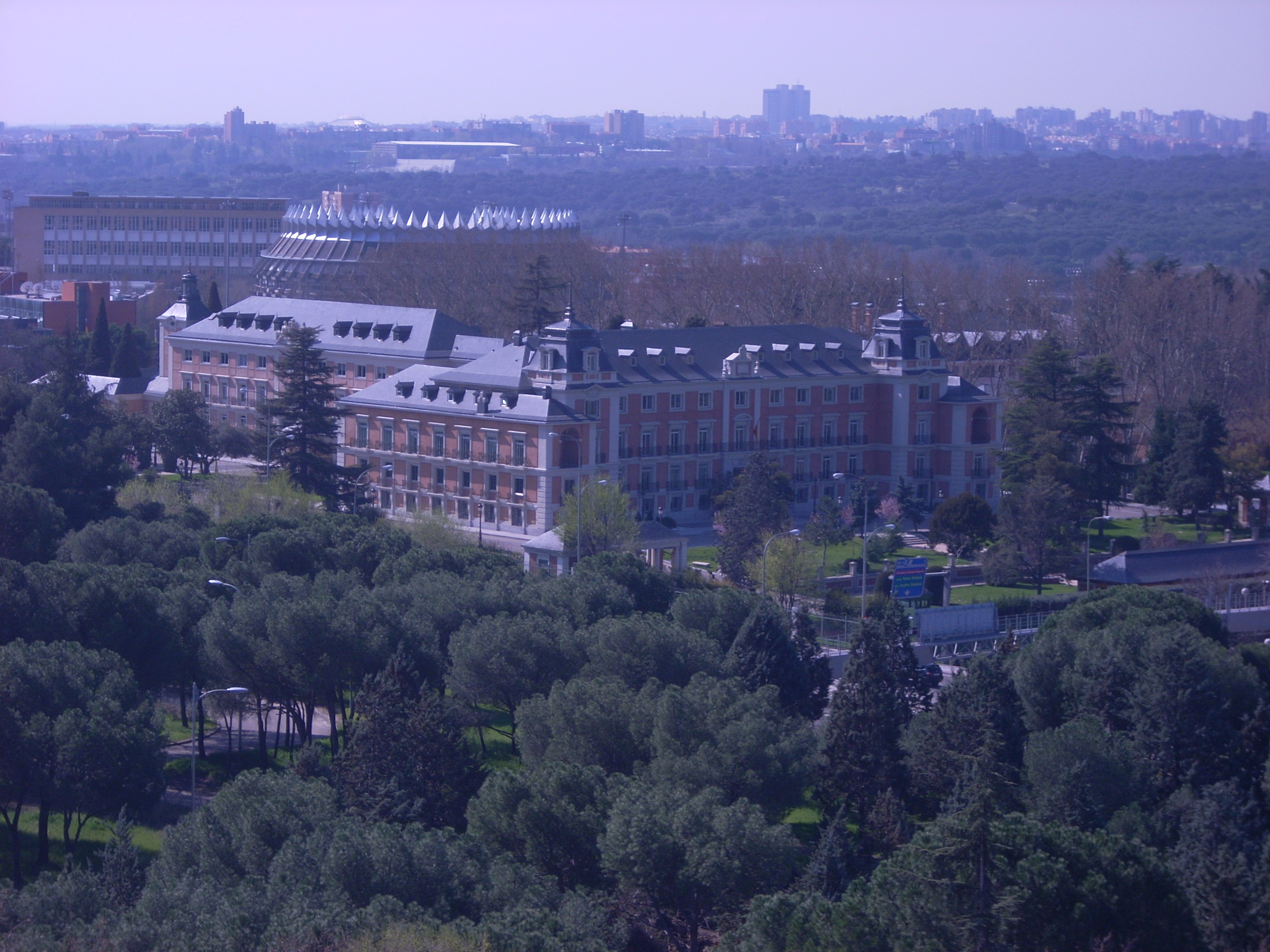
Aerial view of the Palace of Moncloa, the residence of the prime minister of Spain

At the national level, executive power in Spain is exercised only by "the Government". (The King is the head of state, but the constitution does not attribute to him any executive faculties). The Government is composed by a prime minister, known as the "president of the Government" (Spanish: presidente del gobierno), one or more deputy prime ministers, known as "vice-presidents of the Government" (Spanish: vicepresidentes del gobierno) and all other ministers. The collegiate body composed by the prime minister, the deputy prime ministers, and all other ministers is called the Council of Ministers. The Government is in charge of both domestic and foreign policy, as well as defense and economic policies. As of 2 June 2018, the prime minister of Spain is Pedro Sánchez.

The constitution establishes that after elections, the King, after consulting with all political groups represented in the Congress of Deputies, proposes a candidate to the "presidency of the Government" or prime ministership through the Speaker of Congress. The candidate then presents the political program of their government requesting the Congress's confidence.

Upon receiving an absolute majority in Congress, the candidate earns formal nomination by the King as "president of the Government." Should the candidate fail to receive an absolute majority, Congress must wait 48 hours to vote again for the prime minister, but this vote requires only a simple majority. In the case candidates fail to receive a majority on the second vote, the King will propose alternative candidates. Following two months of failed investiture votes from the date of the first ballot, the King dissolves the Cortes Generales and calls for new elections with the endorsement of the Speaker of Congress. In practice, the candidate has been the leader of the party that obtained the largest number of seats in the Congress. Since the constitution of 1978 came into effect, there were no coalition governments until 2019–2020 Spanish government formation. Prior to this, minority governments have had to rely on the support of minority parties to gain confidence and to approve the State's budgets.

After the candidate obtains the confidence of the Congress of Deputies, they are appointed by the King as prime minister in a ceremony of inauguration in which they are sworn at the Audience Hall of the Palace of Zarzuela – the residence of the King – and in presence of the Major Notary of the Kingdom. The candidate takes the oath of office over an open copy of the Constitution next to a Bible. The oath of office used is: "I swear/promise to faithfully carry out the duties of the position of president of the Government with loyalty to the King; to obey and enforce the Constitution as the fundamental law of the State, as well as to keep in secret the deliberations of the Council of Ministers".

The prime minister proposes the deputy prime ministers and the other ministers, which are then appointed by the King. The number and the scope of powers of each of the Ministries is decided by the prime minister. Ministries are usually created to cover one or several similar sectors of government. Once formed, the Government meets as the "Council of Ministers", usually every Friday at the Palace of Moncloa in Madrid, the official residence of the prime minister who presides over the meetings, even though, on exceptions they can be held in any other Spanish city. Also, on exceptions, the meeting can be presided by the King of Spain, by request of the prime minister, in which case, the Council informs the King of the State's affairs.

Currently, the government consists of these members:

Portfolio	Name	Party	Took office
Prime Minister	Pedro Sánchez	PSOE	2 June 2018
First Deputy Prime Minister; Minister of Economy, Trade and Enterprise; Minister of Transport, and Sustainable Mobility (ordinary discharge of duties)	Carlos Cuerpo	Independent (Note: Nominated by PSOE)	29 December 2023 (First Deputy Prime Minister since 27 March 2026) (Minister of Transport since 4 November 2026)
Second Deputy Prime Minister; Minister of Labour and Social Economy	Yolanda Díaz	Sumar	13 January 2020 (Second Deputy Prime Minister since 12 July 2021)
Third Deputy Prime Minister; Minister for the Ecological Transition and the Demographic Challenge	Sara Aagesen	Independent	25 November 2024
Minister of Foreign Affairs, European Union and Cooperation	José Manuel Albares	PSOE	12 July 2021
Minister of the Presidency, Justice and Relations with the Cortes; First Notary of the Kingdom; Secretary of the Council of Ministers	Félix Bolaños	PSOE	21 November 2023
Minister of Defence	Margarita Robles	Independent	13 January 2020
Minister of Finance	Arcadi España	PSOE	27 March 2026
Minister of the Interior	Fernando Grande-Marlaska	Independent	13 January 2020
Minister of Education, Vocational Training and Sports	Milagros Tolón	PSOE	22 December 2025: 21 November 2023
Minister of Industry and Tourism	Jordi Hereu	PSC–PSOE	21 November 2023
Minister of Agriculture, Fisheries and Food	Luis Planas	PSOE	13 January 2020
Minister of Territorial Policy and Democratic Memory	Ángel Víctor Torres	PSOE	21 November 2023
Minister of Housing and Urban Agenda	Isabel Rodríguez	PSOE	21 November 2023
Minister of Culture	Ernest Urtasun	Sumar	21 November 2023
Minister of Health	Mónica García	Sumar	21 November 2023
Minister of Science, Innovation and Universities	Diana Morant	PSOE	12 July 2021
Minister of Equality	Ana Redondo	PSOE	21 November 2023
Minister of Social Rights, Consumer Affairs and 2030 Agenda	Pablo Bustinduy	Sumar	21 November 2023
Minister of Inclusion, Social Security and Migration Spokesperson of the Government	Elma Saiz	PSOE	21 November 2023 (Spokesperson of the government since 22 December 2025)
Minister of Digital Transformation	Óscar López	PSOE	6 September 2024
Minister of Youth and Children	Sira Rego	Sumar	21 November 2023

=== The Council of State ===
The constitution also established the Council of State, a supreme advisory council to the Spanish government. Though the body has existed intermittently since medieval times, its current composition and the nature of its work are defined in the constitution and subsequent laws that have been published, the most recent in 2004. It is currently composed of a president, nominated by the Council of Ministers, several ex officio councillors – former prime ministers of Spain, directors or presidents of the Royal Spanish Academy, the Royal Academy of Jurisprudence and Legislation, the Royal Academy of History, the Social and Economic Council, the Attorney General of the State, the Chief of Staff, the Governor of the Bank of Spain, the Director of the Juridical Service of the State, and the presidents of the General Commission of Codification and Law – several permanent councilors, appointed by decree, and no more than ten elected councilors in addition to the council's Secretary General. The Council of State serves only as an advisory body, that can give non-binding opinions upon request and to propose an alternative solution to the problem presented.

== Judiciary ==
The Judiciary in Spain is made up of judges and magistrates who administer justice in the King's name. The Judiciary is composed of different courts depending on the jurisdictional order and what is to be judged. The highest ranking court of the Spanish judiciary is the Supreme Court (Spanish: Tribunal Supremo), with jurisdiction in all Spain, superior in all matters except in constitutional guarantees. The Supreme Court is headed by a president, nominated by the King, proposed by the General Council of the Judiciary. The Supreme Court is the governing body of the Judiciary, made up of the president of the Supreme court, twenty members appointed by the King for a five-year term, among whom there are twelve judges and magistrates of all judicial categories, four members nominated by the Congress of Deputies, and four by the Senate, elected in both cases by three-fifths of their respective members. They are to be elected from among lawyers and jurists of acknowledged competence and with over 15 years of professional experience.

The Constitutional Court (Spanish: Tribunal Constitucional) has jurisdiction over all Spain, competent to hear appeals against the alleged unconstitutionality of laws and regulations having the force of law, as well as individual appeals for protection (recursos de amparo) against violation of the rights and liberties granted by the constitution. It consists of 12 members, appointed by the King, 4 of which are proposed by the Congress of Deputies by three-fifths of its members, 4 of which are proposed by the Senate by three-fifths of its members as well, 2 proposed by the executive and 2 proposed by the General Council of the Judiciary. They are to be renowned magistrates and prosecutors, university professors, public officials or lawyers, all of them jurists with recognized competence or standing and more than 15 years of professional experience.

== Regional government ==
The second article of the constitution declares the Spanish nation is the common and indivisible homeland of all Spaniards, which is made up of nationalities and regions to which the constitution recognizes and guarantees the right to self-government. Since the constitution of 1978 came into effect, these nationalities and regions progressively acceded to self-government and were constituted as 17 autonomous communities. In addition, two autonomous cities were constituted on the coast of North Africa. This administrative and political division is known ambiguously as the State of Autonomies to avoid implying either a unitary or federal model. Foreign scholars usually define Spain as a federal system with certain peculiarities.

The State, that is, the central government, has progressively and asymmetrically devolved or transferred power and competences to the autonomous communities. Each autonomous community is governed by a set of institutions established in its own Statute of Autonomy. The Statute of Autonomy is the basic organic institutional law, approved by the legislature of the community itself as well as by the Cortes Generales, the Spanish Parliament. The Statutes of Autonomy establish the name of the community according to its historical identity; the delimitation of its territory; the name, organization and seat of the autonomous institutions of government; and the powers that they assume and the process for their devolution or transfer from the central government.

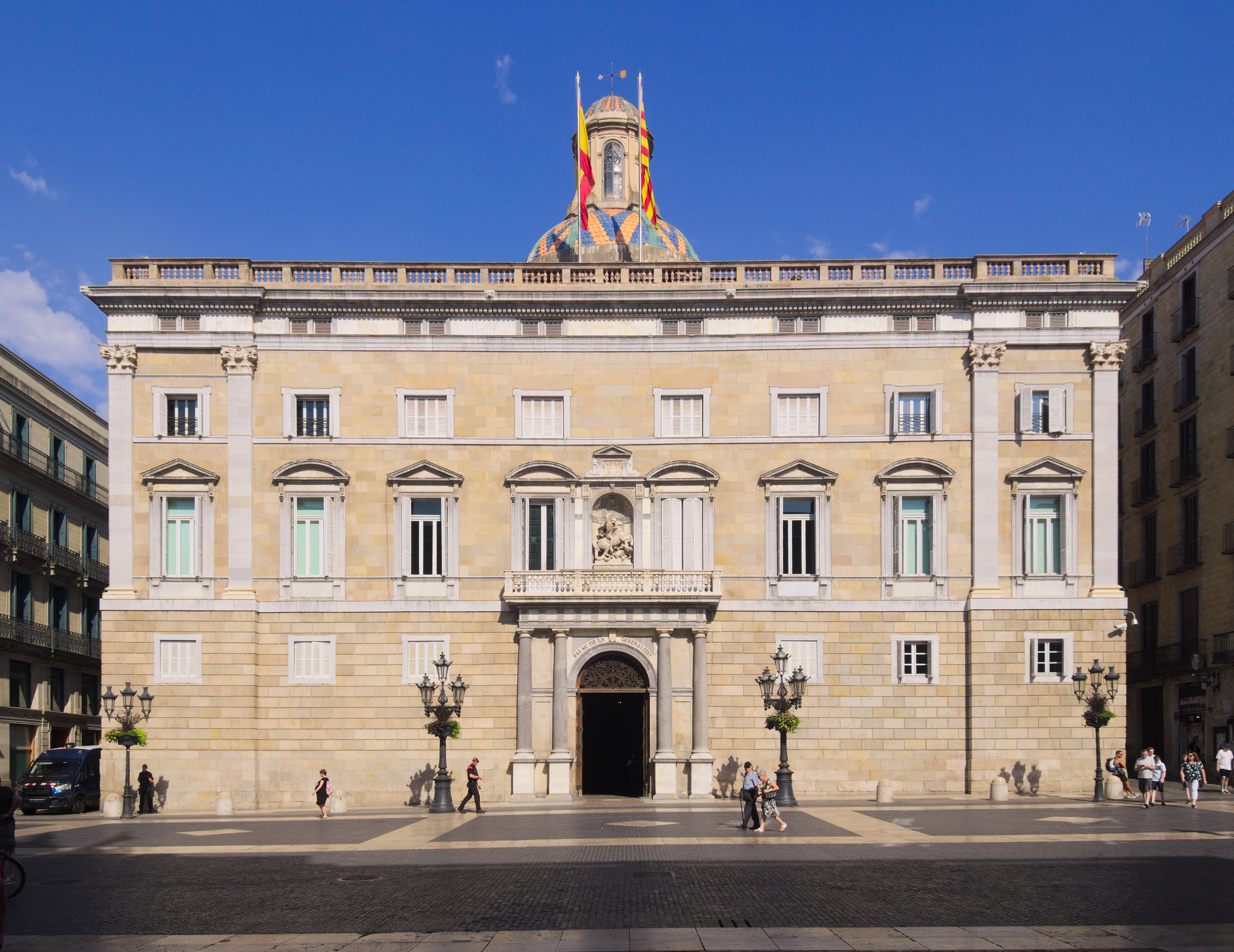
Façade of the Palace of the Generalitat of Catalonia

All autonomous communities have a parliamentary form of government, and separation of powers between executive and legislative branches. Their legislatures represent the people of the community, exercising legislative power within the limits set forth in the constitution and their statutes of autonomy. Even though the central government has progressively transferred roughly the same powers to all communities, devolution is still asymmetrical. More power was devolved to the so-called "historical nationalities" – the Basque Country, Catalonia and Galicia. (Other communities chose afterwards to identify themselves as nationalities as well). The Basque Country, Catalonia and Navarre have their own police forces (Ertzaintza, Mossos d'Esquadra and the Chartered Police respectively) while the National Police Corps operates in the rest of the autonomous communities. On the other hand, two communities (the Basque Country and Navarre) are "communities of chartered regime", that is, they have full fiscal autonomy, whereas the rest are "communities of common regime", with limited fiscal powers (the majority of their taxes are administered centrally and redistributed among them all for fiscal equalization).

The names of the executive government and the legislature vary between communities. Some institutions are restored historical bodies of government of the previous kingdoms or regional entities within the Spanish crown – like the Generalitat of Catalonia – while others are entirely new creations. In some, both the executive and the legislature, though constituting two separate institutions, are collectively identified with a specific name. A specific denomination may not refer to the same branch of government in all communities; for example, "Junta" may refer to the executive office in some communities, to the legislature in others, or to the collective name of all branches of government in others.

Autonomous community	Collective name of institutions	Executive	Legislature	Identity	Co-official language
Andalusia	Board of Andalusia	Council of Government	Parliament of Andalusia	Nationality	
Aragon	Government of Aragon	Government	Cortes of Aragon	Nationality	
Asturias	Government of the Princedom of Asturias	Council of Government	General Junta	Region (Note: Also identified as a "historical community" in its Statute of Autonomy)	
Balearic Islands	Government of the Balearic Islands	Government	Parliament of the Balearic Islands	Nationality	Catalan
Basque Country	Basque Government	Government	Basque Parliament	Nationality	Basque
Canary Islands	Government of the Canary Islands	Government	Parliament of Canarias	Nationality	
Cantabria	Government of Cantabria	Government	Parliament of Cantabria	Region (Note: Also identified as a "historical community" in its Statute of Autonomy.)	
Castile-La Mancha	Regional Government of Castile-La Mancha	Council of Government	Cortes of Castile-La Mancha	Region	
Castile and León	Board of Castile and León	Board of Castile and León	Cortes of Castile and León	Region (Note: Also identified as a "historical and cultural community" in its Statute of Autonomy.)	
Catalonia	Generalitat of Catalonia	Council of Government	Parliament of Catalonia	Nationality	Catalan, Occitan
Community of Madrid	Government of the Community of Madrid	Government	Assembly of Madrid	Community (Note: The Community of Madrid was detached from Castile-La Mancha to conform a distinct autonomous community in the nation's interest since its capital, Madrid, is also the capital of the Spanish nation, and seat of the State's institutions of government. It is therefore, not referred to neither as a region nor as a nationality in its Statute of Autonomy.)	
Extremadura	Board of Extremadura	Board of Extremadura	Assembly of Extremadura	Region	
Galicia	Board of Galicia	Board of Galicia	Parliament of Galicia	Nationality	Galician
La Rioja	Government of La Rioja	Government	Parliament of La Rioja	Region	
Murcia	Government of the Región de Murcia	Council of Government	Regional Assembly of Murcia	Region	
Navarre	Government of Navarre	Government	Parliament of Navarre	Regional law community (Note: Navarra acceded to self-government through the "reintegration" and "improvement" of its medieval regional code of laws whereby it had some autonomy to manage its internal affairs.)	Basque
Valencian Community	Generalitat Valenciana	Council of Government	Corts Valencianes	Nationality	Catalan (Note: In Valencia, the language is historically and officially known as Valencian.)

The two autonomous cities have more limited competences. The executive is exercised by a president, which is also the mayor of the city. In the same way, limited legislative power is vested in a local Assembly in which the deputies are also the city councilors.

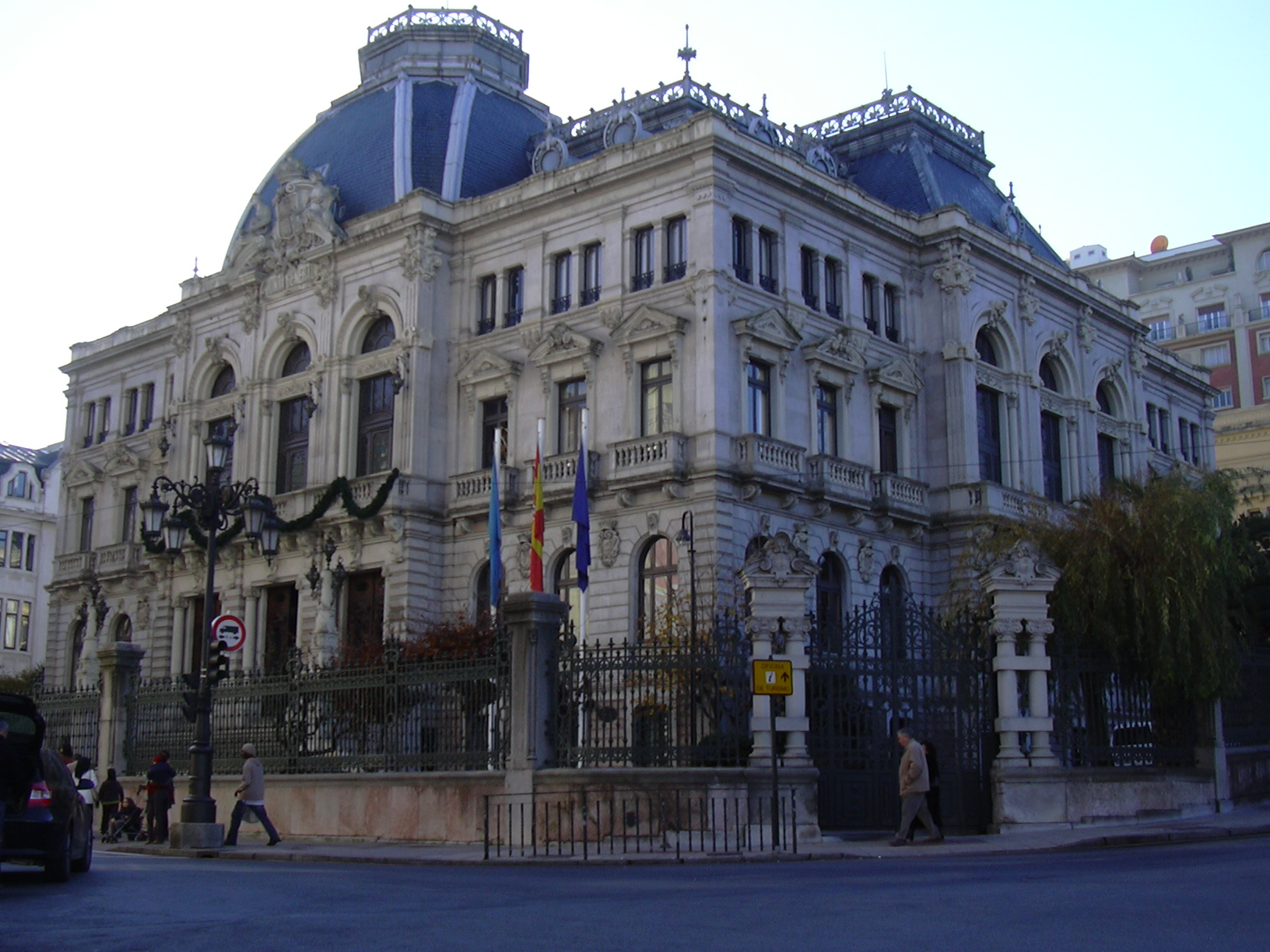
Building of the General Junta of the Principality of Asturias

== Local government ==
Local government refers to the government and administration of what the constitution calls "local entities", which are primarily municipalities, but also groups of municipalities including provinces, metropolitan areas, comarcas and mancomunidades and sub-municipal groups known as Minor local entities (Spanish: Entidad de Ámbito Territorial Inferior al Municipio). The administration of these entities is mostly provided by a council.

The constitution recognises a degree of autonomy for the municipalities and the provinces of Spain (groupings of municipalities) which broadly means that the entities have the right to take decisions for the running of local services without political interference from the regions or from the central government. However in practice central and regional governments continue to supervise the legality of local governments' acts, and their decisions can still be suspended.

One of the most important and recurrent problems of local government is that due to their small size (nearly 5000 having less than 1000 inhabitants), many municipalities are incapable of providing the essential public services that are obligatory under the law due to lack of expertise and resources. Other problems include difficulty in defining a role for provincial councils, the powers of local government are still the subject of constitutional discussion, the structural problems of financing local government and the economic inefficiency of duplicated services. It has been suggested that the problem stems from not having clarity between an entity that exists for a citizen's identity and participation and an entity that provides services.

== Political parties ==
Spain is a multi-party constitutional parliamentary democracy. According to the constitution, political parties are the expression of political pluralism, contributing to the formation and expression of the will of the people, and are an essential instrument of political participation. Their internal structure and functioning must be democratic. The Law of Political Parties of 1978 provides them with public funding whose quantity is based on the number of seats held in the Cortes Generales and the number of votes received. Since the mid-1980s two parties dominate the national political landscape in Spain: the Spanish Socialist Workers' Party (Spanish: Partido Socialista Obrero Español) and the People's Party (Spanish: Partido Popular).

The Spanish Socialist Workers' Party (PSOE) is a social democratic centre-left political party. It was founded in 1879 by Pablo Iglesias, at the beginning as a Marxist party for the workers' class, which later evolved towards social-democracy. Outlawed during Franco's dictatorship, it gained recognition during the Spanish transition to democracy period, when it officially renounced Marxism, under the leadership of Felipe González. It played a key role during the transition and the Constituent Assembly that wrote the Spanish current constitution. It governed Spain from 1982 to 1996 under the prime ministership of Felipe González. It governed again from 2004 to 2011 under the prime ministership of José Luis Rodriguez Zapatero.

The People's Party (PP) is a conservative centre-right party that took its current name in 1989, replacing the previous People's Alliance, a more conservative party founded in 1976 by seven former Francoist ministers. In its refoundation it incorporated the Liberal Party and the majority of the Christian democrats. In 2005 it integrated the Democratic and Social Center Party. It governed Spain under the prime ministership of José María Aznar from 1996 to 2004, and again from December 2011, and after much uncertainty caused by the inconclusive results of the 2015 general election and the 2016 election when the People's Party formed a minority government with confidence and supply support from liberal Ciudadanos (Cs) and the Canarian Coalition (CC), which passed due to the Spanish Socialist Workers' Party (PSOE) abstaining. A motion of no confidence in the Spanish government of Mariano Rajoy was held between 31 May and 1 June 2018, registered by the Spanish Socialist Workers' Party (PSOE) after the People's Party (PP) was found to have profited from the illegal kickbacks-for-contracts scheme of the Gürtel affair. The motion was successful and resulted in the PSOE leader Pedro Sánchez becoming the new Prime Minister of Spain until his 2019 state budget was rejected requiring him to call a snap election for 28 April of the same year.

The parties or coalitions represented in the Cortes Generales after the July 2023 election are:

- People's Party (Partido Popular, or PP)
- Spanish Socialist Workers' Party (Partido Socialista Obrero Español, or PSOE)
  - Socialists' Party of Catalonia (Partit dels Socialistes de Catalunya, or PSC-PSOE)
- Vox
- Sumar
  - More Country (Más País, or MP)
  - Unite Movement (Movimiento Sumar, or MS)
  - United Left (Izquierda Unida, or IU)
  - Verdes Equo (Los Verdes - Equo, or EQUO)
  - Green Alliance (Alianza Verde, or AV)
  - Commitment Coalition (Coalició Compromís)
  - Catalonia in Common (Catalunya en Comú, or Comuns)
  - More for Mallorca (Més per Mallorca, or MÉS)
  - More for Menorca (Més per Menorca, or MxM)
  - Aragonist Union (Chunta Aragonesista or CHA)
  - Drago Canarys (Drago Canarias)
  - Asturian Left (Izquierda Asturiana or IAS)
  - Assembly (Batzarre)
- We can (Podemos)
- Republican Left of Catalonia (Esquerra Republicana de Catalunya or ERC)
- Together for Catalonia (Junts per Catalunya, or Junts)
- Basque Nationalist Party (Euzko Alderdi Jeltzalea, Partido Nacionalista Vasco, Parti National Basque, or PNV)
- Canarian Coalition (Coalición Canaria or CC-PNC)
- Galician Nationalist Bloc (Galician: Bloque Nacionalista Galego, BNG)
- Basque Country Unite (Euskal Herria Bildu or EHB).
- Sum Navarre (Navarra Suma)

Other parties represented in Congress from 2011 to 2023 were:

- Convergence and Union (Catalan: Convergència i Unió, CiU), a coalition of two Catalan nationalist parties; after its dissolution Democratic Convergence of Catalonia (Catalan: Convergència Democràtica de Catalunya, CDC) renamed as Democracy and Freedom (Democràcia i Llibertat or DiL).
- Plural Left (Spanish: Izquierda Plural, IP); a coalition of several left-wing parties, among which the largest party is the United Left (Spanish: Izquierda Unida, IU)
- Amaiur, a coalition of Basque nationalist parties
- Union, Progress and Democracy (Spanish: Unión, Progreso y Democracia, UPyD)
- Commitment Coalition (Catalan: Coalició Compromís), a coalition of Valencianist parties, now under the umbrella of Sumar.
- Citizen's Forum,
- Democracy and Freedom (Democràcia i Llibertat or DiL)
- Yes to the Future (Basque: Geroa Bai).
- Citizens (Ciudadanos or C's)
- Popular Unity Candidacy-For Rupture (Candidatura d'Unitat Popular, or CUP)
- Regionalist Party of Cantabria (Partido Regionalista de Cantabria, or PRC)
- Teruel Exists (Teruel Existe)

In addition, the Aragonese Party, United Extremadura, and the Union of Navarrese People participated in the 2011 elections forming regional coalitions with the People's Party.

== Electoral process ==
Suffrage is free and secret to all Spanish citizens of age 18 and older to all elections, and to residents who are citizens of all European Union countries only in local municipal elections and elections to the European Parliament.

=== Congress of Deputies ===
Relation between the number of people represented by each deputy in each province and the national average (June 2016 elections).

Elections to the Cortes Generales are held every four years or before if the prime minister calls for an early election. Members of the Congress of Deputies are elected through proportional representation with closed party lists where provinces serve as electoral districts; that is, a list of deputies is selected from a province-wide list. Under the current system, sparsely populated provinces are overrepresented because more seats of representatives are allocated to the sparsely populated provinces than they would have if number of seats are allocated strictly according to the population proportion.

Not only provinces with small population are over-represented in Spain's election system, the system also tends to favors major political parties. Despite the use of proportional representation voting system, which in general encourages the development of a larger number of small political parties rather than a few larger ones, Spain has effectively a two-party system in which smaller and regional parties tend to be underrepresented. This is owing to various reasons:

- Due to the great disparity in population among provinces, even though smaller provinces are overrepresented, the total number of deputies assigned to them is still small and tends to go to one or two major parties, even if other smaller parties managed to obtain more than 3% of the votes – the minimum threshold for representation in the Congress.
- The average district magnitude (the average number of seats per constituency) is one of the lowest in Europe, owing to the large number of constituencies. The low district magnitude tends to increase the number of wasted votes (the votes that could not affect the election results because they have been cast for the small parties which could not pass the effective threshold), and in turn increase the disproportionality (so the number of seats and the portion of votes got by a party becomes less proportional). It is often regarded as the most important factor that limits the number of parties in Spain. This point is advanced when Baldini and Pappalardo compare it with the case of Netherlands, where the parliament is elected using proportional representation in a single national constituency. There, the parliament is much more fragmented and the number of parties is much higher than in Spain.
- The D'Hondt method (a type of highest average method) is used to allocate the seats, which slightly favors the major parties when compared to Sainte-Laguë method (another type of highest average method) or the normal kinds of largest remainder methods. It is suggested that the use of D'Hondt method also contribute to a certain degree, though not as large as the low number of seats per constituency, to the bipolarization of the party system.
- The 3% threshold for entering the Congress is ineffective in many provinces, where the number of seats per constituency is so low that the actual threshold to enter the Congress is effectively higher, and thus many parties cannot obtain representation in Congress despite having obtained more than the 3% threshold in the constituency. For example, the actual threshold for the constituencies having 3 seats is 25%, much higher than 3%, making the 3% threshold irrelevant. However, in the largest constituencies like Madrid and Barcelona, where the number of seats is much higher, the 3% threshold is still effective to eliminate the smallest parties.
- The size of the Congress (350 members) is relatively small. It is suggested by Lijphart that the small size of parliament may encourage disproportionality and so favor the large parties.

=== Senate ===
In the Senate, each province, with the exception of the islands, select four senators using block voting: voters cast ballots for three candidates, and the four senators with the greatest number of votes are selected. The number of senators selected for the islands varies, depending on their size, from 1 to 3 senators. A similar procedure of block voting is used to select the three senators from the three major islands whereas the senators of the smaller islands or group of islands, are elected by plurality. In addition, the legislative assembly of each autonomous community designates one senator, and another for each additional one million inhabitants.

=== Electoral participation ===
Although voting is not compulsory, voter turnout has traditionally been high, peaking just after democracy was restored in the late 1970s, falling during the 1980s, but trending upwards in the 1990s. Since then, voting abstention rate has been around one-fifth to nearly one-third of the electorate.

== Recent historical political developments ==
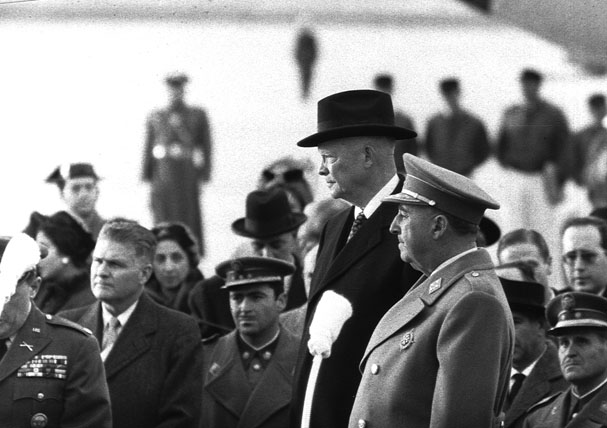
General Francisco Franco and U.S. president Dwight D. Eisenhower in Madrid, 1960

The end of the Spanish Civil War put an end to the Second Spanish Republic (1931–1939), after which a dictatorial regime was established, headed by general Francisco Franco. In 1947 he decreed, in one of the eight Fundamental Laws of his regime, the Law of Succession to the Headship of the State, that Spain was a monarchy with a vacant throne, that Franco was the head of State as general and caudillo of Spain, and that he would propose, when he deemed opportune, his successor, who would bear the title of King or Regent of Spain. Even though Juan of Bourbon, the legitimate heir of the monarchy, opposed the law, Franco met him in 1948, when they agreed that his son, Juan Carlos, then 10 years old, would finish his education in Spain – he was then living in Rome – according to the "principles" of the Francoist movement. In 1969, Franco finally designated Juan Carlos as his successor, with the title "Prince of Spain", bypassing his father Juan of Bourbon.

Francisco Franco died on 20 November 1975, and Juan Carlos was crowned King of Spain by the Spanish Cortes, the non-elected Assembly that operated during Franco's regime. Even though Juan Carlos I had sworn allegiance to "National Movement", the sole legal party of the regime, he expressed his support for a transformation of the Spanish political system as soon as he took office. Such an endeavor was not meant to be easy or simple, as the opposition to the regime had to ensure that nobody in their ranks would turn into extremism, and the Army had to resist the temptation to intervene to restore the "Movement".

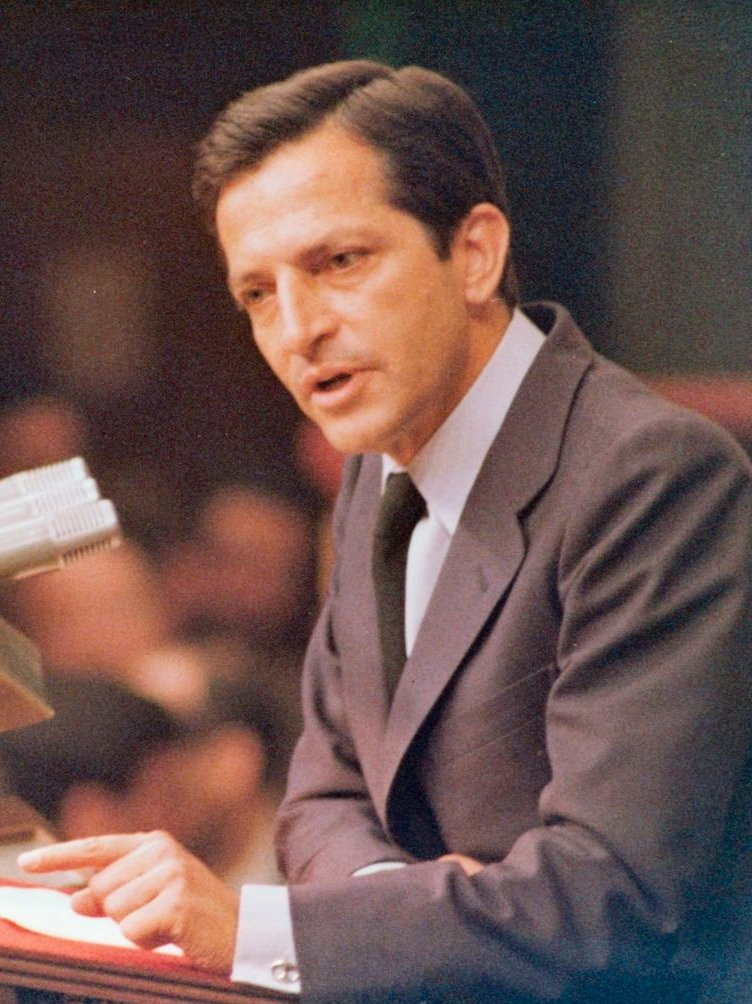
Adolfo Suárez, first Spanish Prime Minister after the Dictatorship.

In 1976 he designated Adolfo Suárez as prime minister – "president of the Government" – with the task of convincing the regime to dismantle itself and to call for elections to a Constituent Assembly. He accomplished both tasks, and the first democratically elected Constituent Cortes since the Second Spanish Republic met in 1977. In 1978 a new democratic constitution was promulgated and approved by referendum. The constitution declared Spain a constitutional parliamentary monarchy with H.M. King Juan Carlos I as Head of State. Spain's transformation from an authoritarian regime to a successful modern democracy was a remarkable achievement, even creating a model emulated by other countries undergoing similar transitions.

Adolfo Suárez headed the prime ministership of Spain from 1977 to 1982, as the leader of the Union of the Democratic Center party. He resigned on 29 January 1981, but on 23 February 1981, the day when the Congress of Deputies was to designate a new prime minister, rebel elements among the Civil Guard seized the Cortes Generales in a failed coup that ended the day after. The great majority of the military forces remained loyal to the King, who used his personal and constitutional authority as commander-in-chief of the Spanish Armed forces, to diffuse the uprising and save the constitution, by addressing the country on television.

In October 1982, the Spanish Socialist Workers' Party, led by Felipe González, swept both the Congress of Deputies and Senate, winning an absolute majority in both chambers of the Cortes Generales. González headed the prime ministership of Spain for the next 13 years, during which period Spain joined NATO and the European Community.

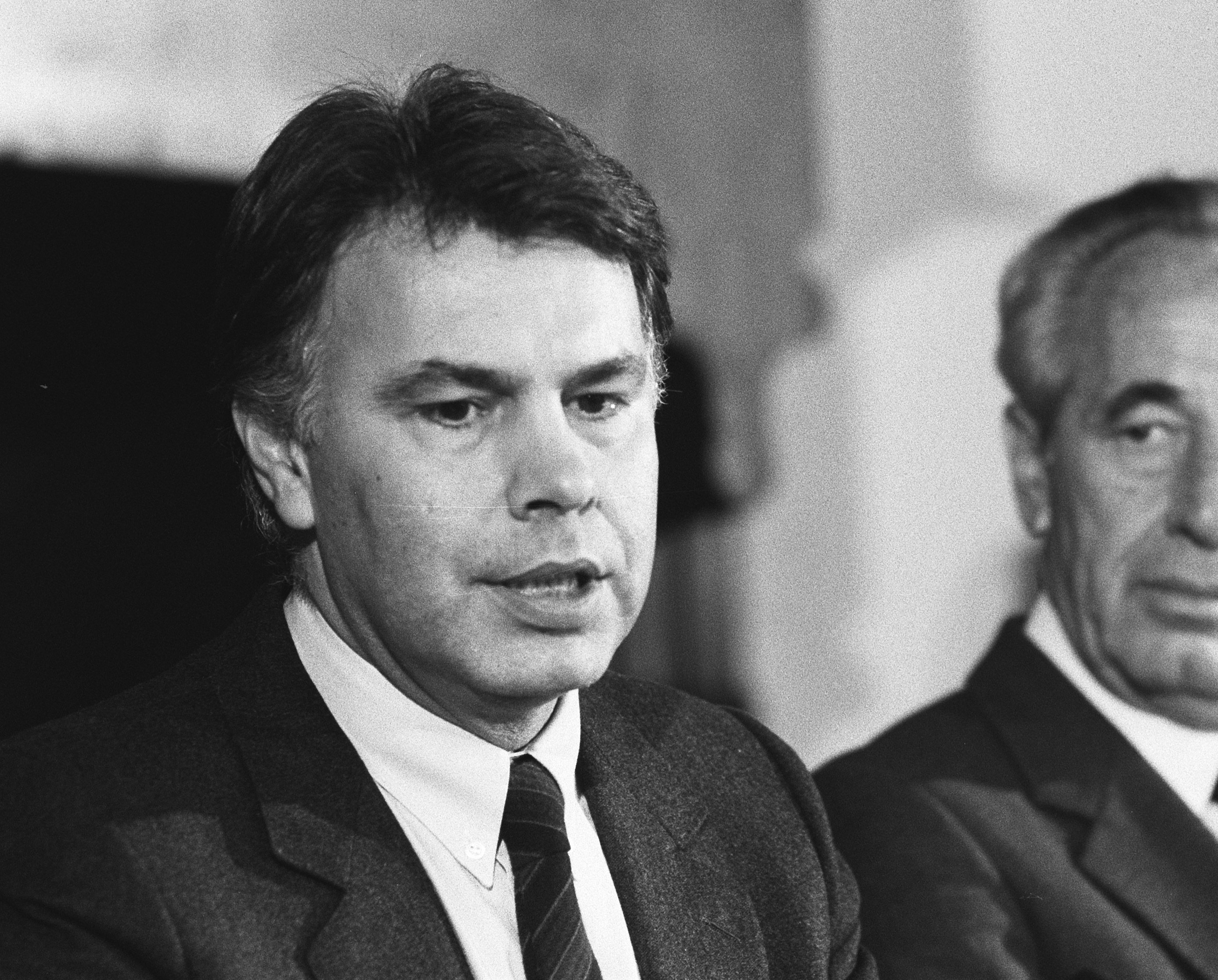
Felipe González, prime minister of Spain from 1982 to 1996.

The government also created new social laws and large scale infrastructural buildings, expanding the educational system and establishing a welfare state. While traditionally affiliated with one of Spain's major trade unions, the General Union of Workers (UGT), in an effort to improve Spain's competitiveness in preparation for admission to the EC as well as for further economic integration with Europe afterwards, the PSOE distanced itself from trade unions. Following a policy of liberalization, González's government closed state corporations under the state holding company, the National Industry Institute (INI), and downsized the coal, iron and steel industries. The PSOE implemented the single-market policies of the Single European Act and the domestic policies consistent with the Maastricht Treaty EMU criteria. The country was massively modernized and economically developed in this period, closing the gap with other European Community members. There was also a significant cultural shift, into a tolerant contemporary open society.

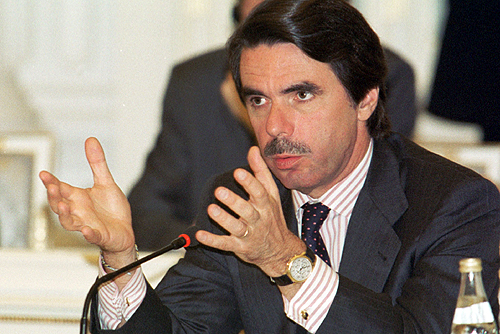
José María Aznar, prime minister of Spain from 1996 to 2004

In March 1996, José María Aznar, from the People's Party, obtained a relative majority in Congress. Aznar moved to further liberalize the economy, with a program of complete privatization of state-owned enterprises, labor market reform and other policies designed to increase competition in selected markets. Aznar liberalized the energy sector, national telecommunications and television broadcasting networks. To ensure a successful outcome of such liberalization, the government set up the Competition Defense Court (Spanish: Tribunal de Defensa de la Competencia), an anti-trust regulator body entrusted with restricting monopolistic practices. During Aznar's government Spain qualified for the Economic and Monetary Union of the European Union, and adopted the euro, replacing the peseta, in 2002. Spain participated, along with the United States and other NATO allies, in military operations in the former Yugoslavia. Spanish armed forces and police personnel were included in the international peacekeeping forces in Bosnia and Herzegovina and Kosovo. Having obtained an absolute majority in the 2000 elections, Aznar, headed the prime ministership until 2004. Aznar supported transatlantic relations with the United States, and participated on the war on terrorism and the invasion of Iraq. In 2004, he decided not to run as a candidate for the Popular Party, and proposed Mariano Rajoy, who had been minister under his government, as his successor as leader of the party.

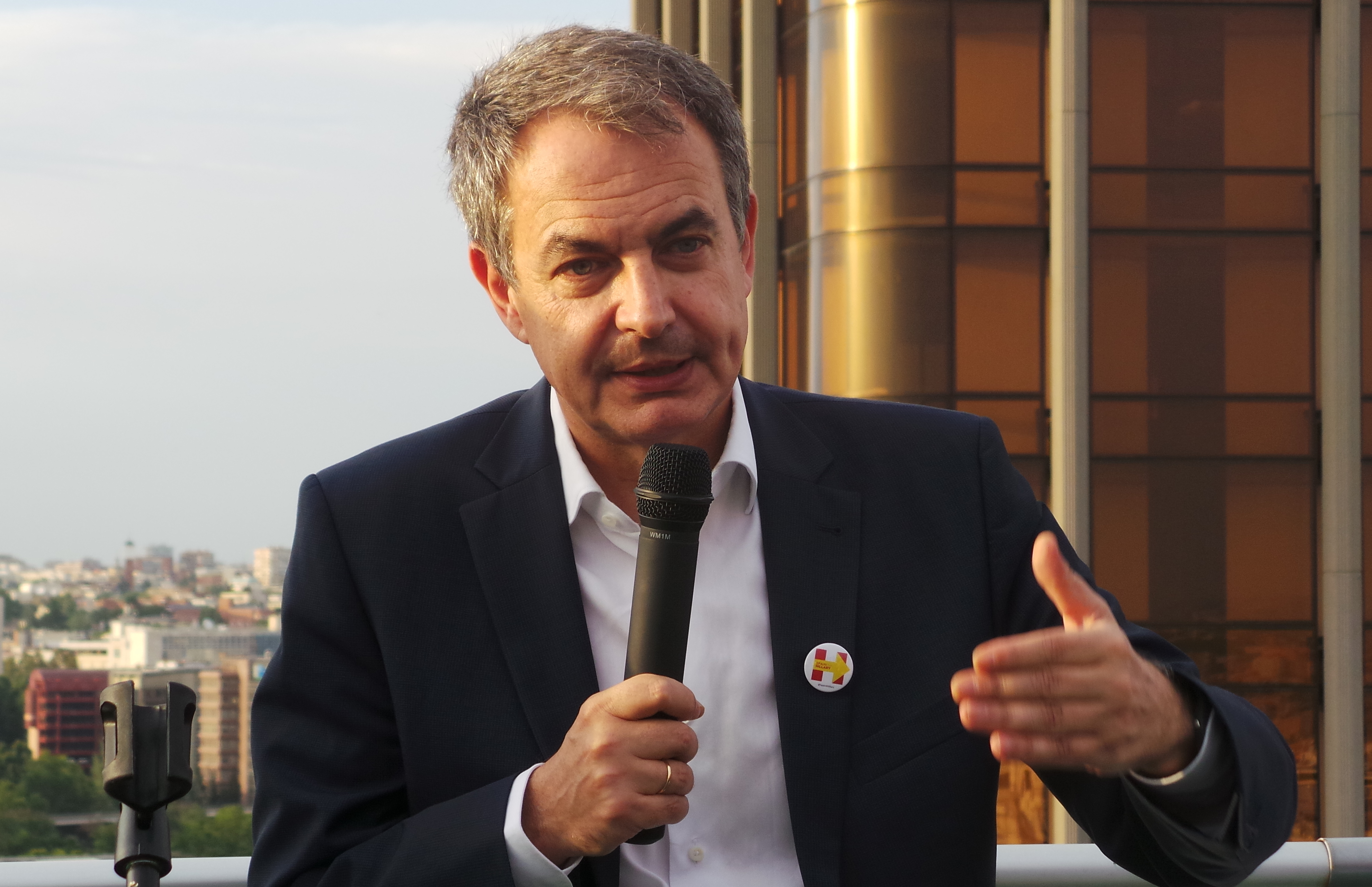
José Luis Rodríguez Zapatero, prime minister of Spain from 2004 to 2011

In the aftermath of the terrorist bomb attacks in Madrid, which occurred just three days before the elections, the Spanish Socialist Workers' Party won a surprising victory. Its leader, José Luis Rodríguez Zapatero, headed the prime ministership from 2004 to 2011, winning a second term in 2008. Under a policy of gender equality, his was the first Spanish Government to have the same number of male and female members in the Council of Ministers. During the first four years of his prime ministership the economy continued to expand rapidly, and the government ran budget surpluses. His government brought social liberal changes to Spain, promoting women's rights, changing the abortion law, and legalizing same-sex marriage, and tried to make the State more secular. The 2008 financial crisis took a heavy toll on Spain's economy, which had been highly dependent on construction since the boom of the late 1990s and early 2000s. When the international financial crisis hit, the construction industry collapsed, along with property values and several banks and cajas (savings banks) were in need of rescuing or consolidation. Economic growth slowed sharply and unemployment soared to over 20%, levels not seen since the late 1990s. In applying counter-cyclical policies during the beginning of the 2008 financial crisis, and the ensuing drop in State revenues, the government financing fell into deficit. During an 18-month period from 2010 to 2011, the government adopted severe austerity measures, cutting spending and laying off workers.

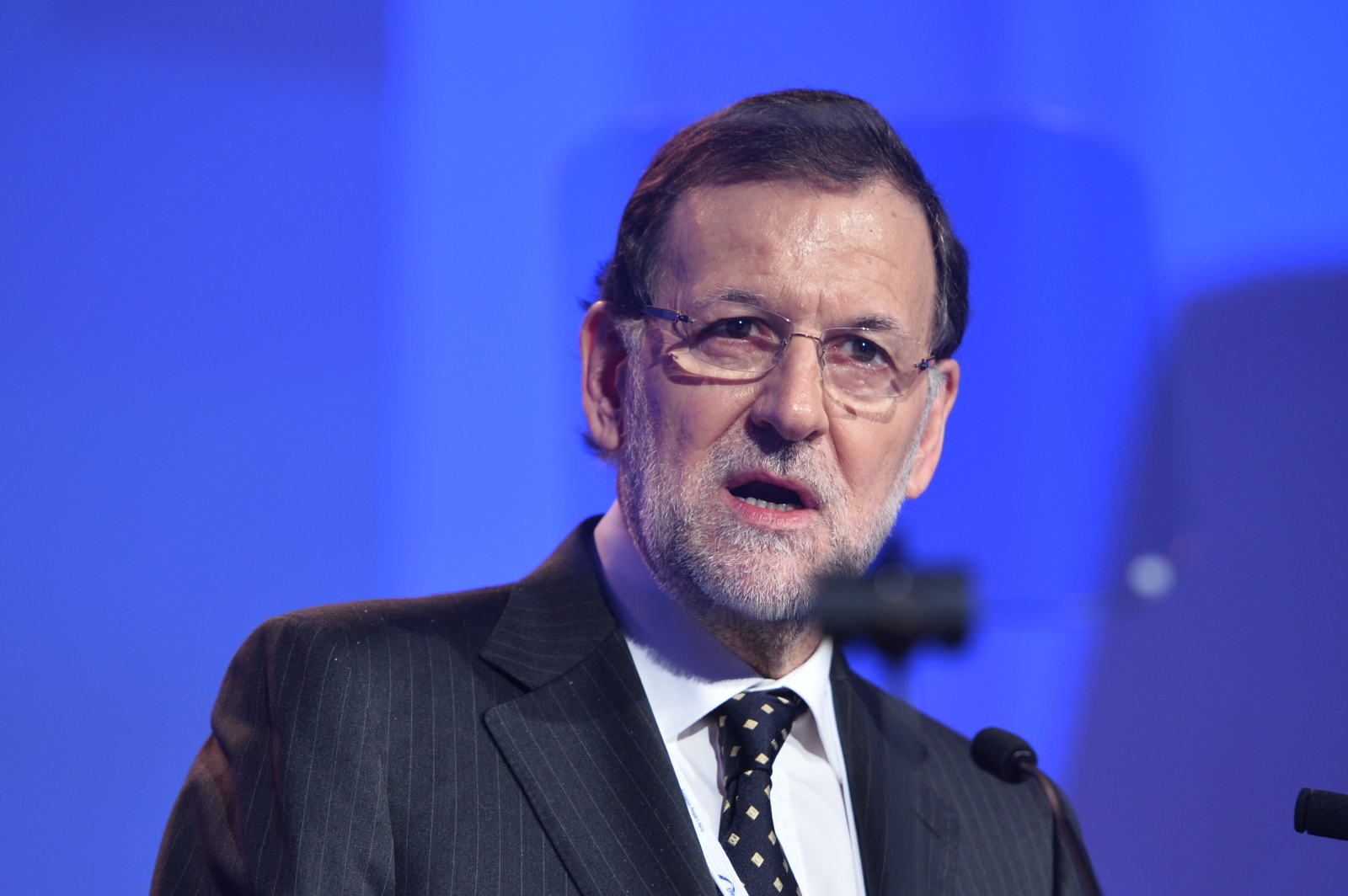
Mariano Rajoy, prime minister of Spain from 2011 to 2018

In March 2011, Rodríguez Zapatero made his decision not to lead the Socialist Party in the coming elections, which he called ahead of schedule for 20 November 2011. The People's Party, which presented Mariano Rajoy for the third time as candidate, won a decisive victory, obtaining an absolute majority in the Congress of Deputies. Alfredo Pérez Rubalcaba, first deputy prime minister during Rodríguez Zapatero's government and candidate for the Socialist Party in 2011, was elected secretary general of his party in 2012, and became the leader of the opposition in Parliament.

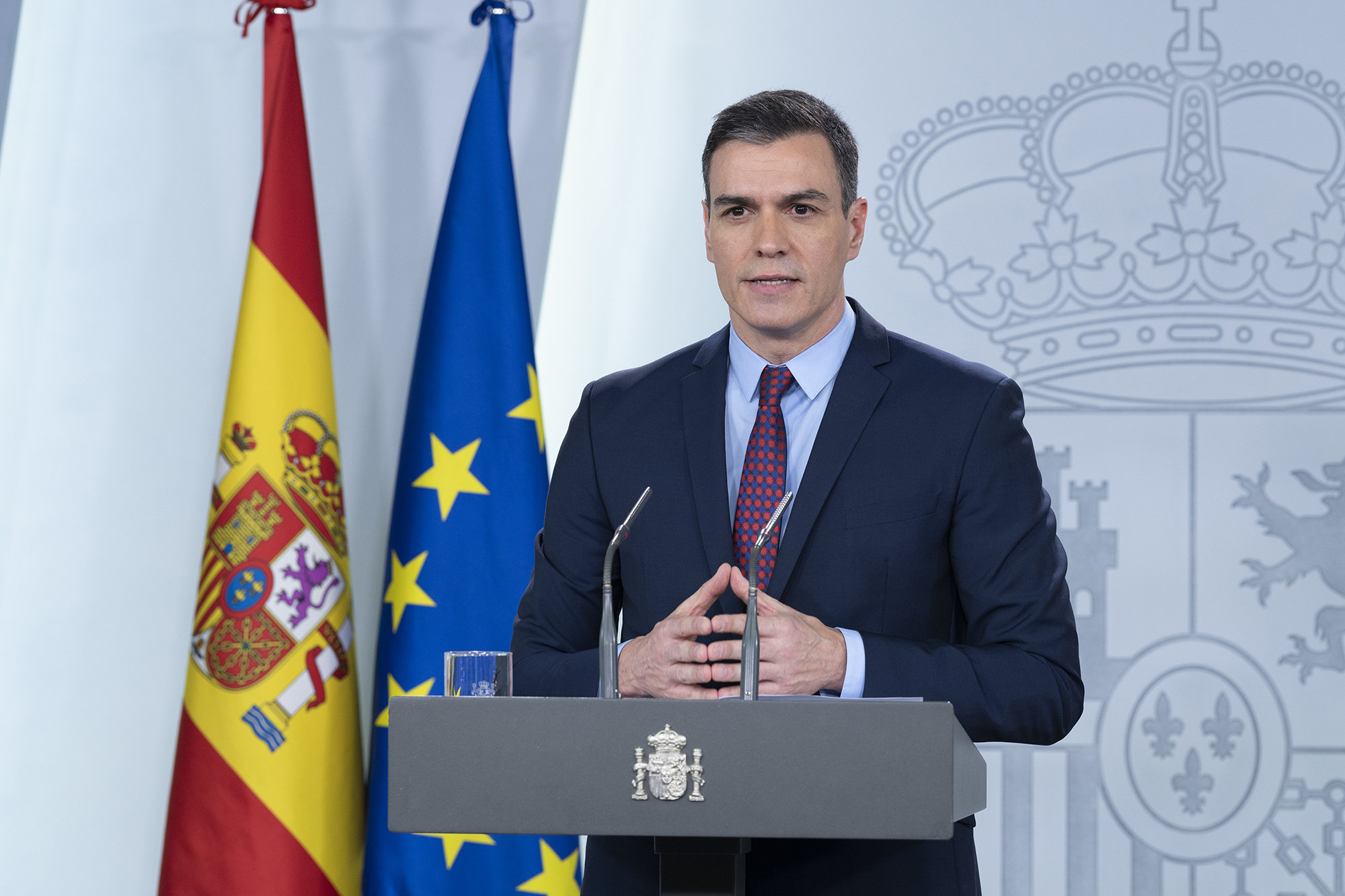
Pedro Sánchez Pérez-Castejón, prime minister of Spain since 2018

The elections of 20 December 2015 were inconclusive, with the People's Party remaining the largest party in Congress, but unable to form a majority government. The PSOE remained the second largest party, but the Podemos and Ciudadanos parties also obtained substantial representation; coalition negotiations were prolonged but failed to install a new government. This led to a further general election on 26 June 2016, in which the PP increased its number of seats in parliament, while still falling short of an overall majority. Eventually on 29 October, Rajoy was re-appointed as prime minister after the majority of the PSOE members abstained in the parliamentary vote rather than oppose him.

In June 2018, Pedro Sánchez, leader of Spanish Socialist Workers' Party (PSOE), was sworn in as the country's new prime minister after conservative Mariano Rajoy was defeated in a no-confidence vote in parliament. In the November 2019 elections, the governing PSOE won the most seats, but fell short of a majority. The conservative Popular Party (PP) came in second and far-right party Vox doubled its seats to become the country's third most-powerful party. In January 2020, Prime Minister Pedro Sánchez formed a new government with radical left-wing Unidas Podemos. It was Spain's first coalition government since democracy was restored in 1978.

== Key political issues ==
A Centro de Investigaciones Sociológicas opinion poll showed the most common political issues in July 2026 included affordable housing, immigration, political instability, corruption, employment and health care.

=== The nationality debate ===
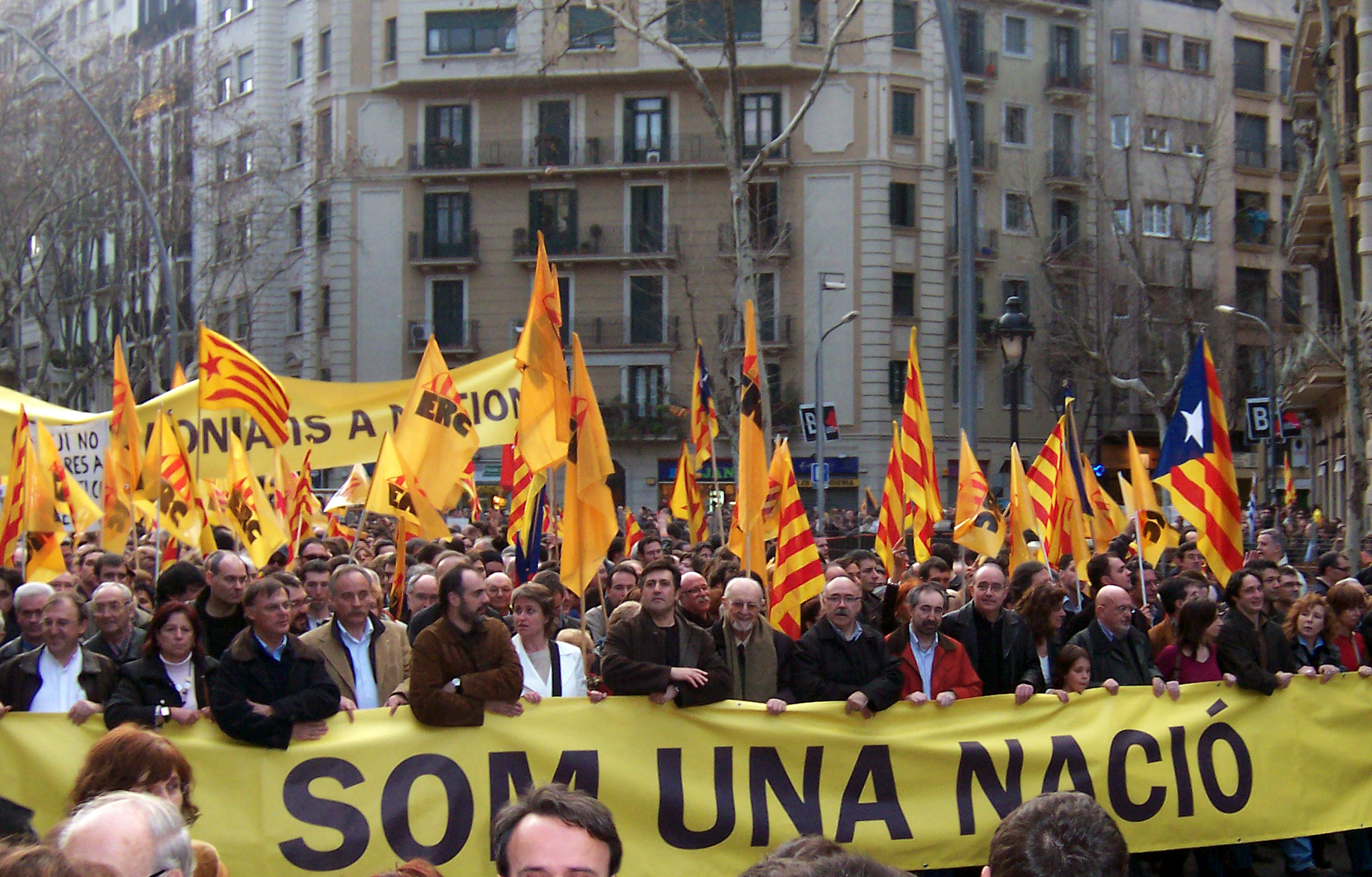
Demonstration led by Republican Left Party of Catalonia in favor of using the term "nation" to define Catalonia in its Statute of Autonomy

Spanish political developments since the early twentieth century have been marked by the existence of peripheral nationalisms and the debate of whether Spain can be viewed as a plurinational federation. Spain is a diverse country with different and contrasting polities showing varying economic and social structures, as well as different languages and historical, political and cultural traditions. Peripheral nationalist movements have been present mainly in the Basque Country, Catalonia and Galicia, some advocating for a special recognition of their "national identity" within the Spanish nation and others for their right of self-determination or independence.

The Constituent Assembly in 1978 struck a deliberately ambiguous and imprecise balance between the opposing views of centralism, inherited from Franco's regime, and those who viewed Spain as a "nation of nations". In the second article, the constitution recognizes the Spanish nation as the common and indivisible homeland of all Spaniards, while guaranteeing the right of autonomy of the nationalities and regions of which it is composed. In practice, and as it began to be used in Spanish jurisprudence, the term "nationalities" makes reference to those regions or autonomous communities with a strong historically constituted sense of identity or a recognized historical cultural identity, as part of the indivisible Spanish nation. This recognition, and the process of devolution within the State of Autonomies has legitimised the idea of the Spanish State among the "nationalities", and many of its citizens feel content within the current status quo.

However since 1982, the PSOE pursued policies to temper enthusiasm for further devolution and instead sought to harmonise the powers devolved to all autonomous communities. This was interpreted as the re-imposition of centralist control from Madrid by the 'historic nationalities' particularly after a landmark ruling of the Constitutional Court upheld the prerogative of the central government to use Basic Laws to encroach upon devolved jurisdictional powers to promote and protect 'the national interest' of the Spanish state.

Thus tensions between peripheral nationalism and centralism continue, with some nationalist parties still advocating for a recognition of the other 'nations' of the Spanish Kingdom or for a peaceful process towards self-determination. The 2014 Catalan self-determination referendum resulted in a vote of 80.76% for independence, with a turnout percentage of 37.0%, and it was supported by five political parties.

=== Education ===
Under the majority governments of the PP in 2000-2004 and 2011–2015, discussions on territorial reform were replaced with 'a renewed form of Spanish nationalism' and 'a centralizing agenda realigning the party's territorial policy with its traditional centralist and nationalist ideology'.

Amongst the Basic Laws passed in this period, which increased central government control over the regions, was the highly controversial 2013 Spanish Educational Law (Organic Law for the Improvement of Educational Quality). This law set certain minimum requirements for the language of instruction used and the curriculum content. It was seen as encroaching upon devolved powers. This issue remained controversial and in 2022 was subject to a number of court cases.

=== Fiscal asymmetry ===
The model of devolution is often termed asymmetric to express the fact that not all regions have the same powers. This is on the whole seen as advantageous; able to respond to diversity. However one aspect of this asymmetry is a cause of friction (eg in Catalonia), namely that the Basque Country and Navarra can raise their own taxes and negotiate a transfer to Madrid to pay for common services and hence, unlike the other regions, do not contribute to fiscal equalisation across Spain.

The Statute of Autonomy of Catalonia of 2006 gave a similar power to Catalonia. However in 2010 the Constitutional Court disallowed the provisions and made it clear that to make the fiscal model in Catalonia like that of Navarra and the Basque Country would require an amendment to the constitution.

In 2024 negotiations began for legislative changes to allow for Catalonia to manage individuals tax returns.

=== Terrorism ===
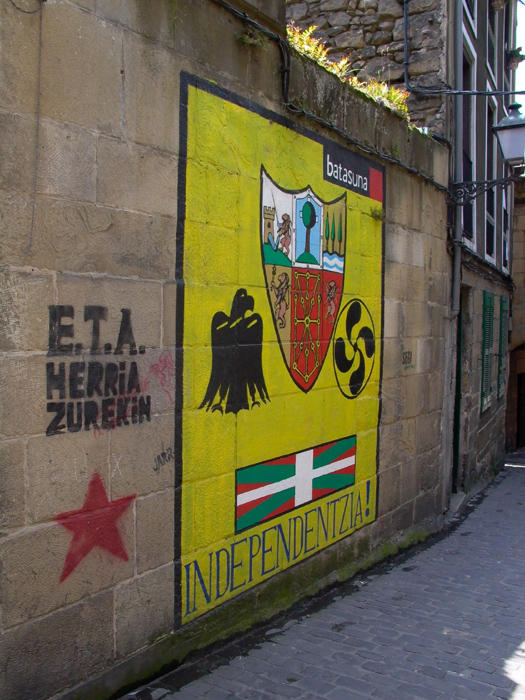
Graffiti in Pasaia (2003). "ETA, the people with you" on the left, and Batasuna using several nationalist symbols asking for "Independence!"

The Government of Spain has been involved in a long-running campaign against Basque Fatherland and Liberty (ETA), an armed secessionist organization founded in 1959 in opposition to Franco and dedicated to promoting Basque independence through violent means, though originally violence was not a part of their method. They consider themselves a guerrilla organization but are considered internationally as a terrorist organisation. Although the government of the Basque Country does not condone any kind of violence, their different approaches to the separatist movement are a source of tension between the Central and Basque governments.

Initially ETA targeted primarily Spanish security forces, military personnel and Spanish Government officials. As the security forces and prominent politicians improved their own security, ETA increasingly focused its attacks on the tourist seasons (scaring tourists was seen as a way of putting pressure on the government, given the sector's importance to the economy) and local government officials in the Basque Country. The group carried out numerous bombings against Spanish Government facilities and economic targets, including a car bomb assassination attempt on then-opposition leader Aznar in 1995, in which his armored car was destroyed but he was unhurt. The Spanish Government attributes over 800 deaths to ETA during its campaign of terrorism.

On 17 May 2005, all the parties in the Congress of Deputies, except the PP, passed the Government's motion giving approval to the beginning of peace talks with ETA, without making political concessions and with the requirement that it give up its weapons. PSOE, CiU, ERC, PNV, IU-ICV, CC and the mixed group —BNG, CHA, EA and NB— supported it with a total of 192 votes, while the 147 PP parliamentarians objected. ETA declared a "permanent cease-fire" that came into force on 24 March 2006 and was broken by Barajas T4 International Airport Bombings on 30 December 2006. In the years leading up to the permanent cease-fire, the government had had more success in controlling ETA, due in part to increased security cooperation with French authorities.

Spain has also contended with a Marxist resistance group, commonly known as GRAPO. GRAPO (Revolutionary group of 1 October) is an urban guerrilla group, founded in Vigo, Galicia; that seeks to overthrow the Spanish Government and establish a Marxist–Leninist state. It opposes Spanish participation in NATO and U.S. presence in Spain and has a long history of assassinations, bombings, bank robberies and kidnappings mostly against Spanish interests during the 1970s and 1980s.

In a June 2000 communiqué following the explosions of two small devices in Barcelona, GRAPO claimed responsibility for several attacks throughout Spain during the past year. These attacks included two failed armored car robberies, one in which two security officers died, and four bombings of political party offices during the 1999–2000 election campaign. In 2002, Spanish authorities were successful in hampering the organization's activities through sweeping arrests, including some of the group's leadership. GRAPO is not capable of maintaining the degree of operational capability that they once enjoyed. Most members of the groups are either in jail or abroad.

== Foreign relations ==
Spain has established itself as a major participant in multilateral international security activities. Spain's European Union membership represents an important part of its foreign policy. Even on many international issues beyond Western Europe, Spain prefers to coordinate its efforts with its EU partners through the European political cooperation mechanisms.

== See also ==
- Censorship in Spain
- Corruption in Spain
- Hate speech laws in Spain
- The two Spains
- Trienio Liberal
- Spanish Constitution of 1812
- Anti-fascism
- Post–World War II anti-fascism
