= Political divisions of Spain =

Government in Spain is divided into three spheres or levels: the State itself, the regions or autonomous communities and local entities (municipalities and groups of municipalities). These levels are not hierarchical, meaning there is no supremacy or primacy of one over the other, but rather they are separately defined by their jurisdictional powers (Spanish: competencias).

The second sphere, that of the regions or autonomous communities, is the second-level subdivision (using the definition of NUTS and OECD) or the first-level subdivision (using the definition of FIPS, CIA World Factbook and ISO 3166-2). There are 17 autonomous communities and two autonomous cities (Melilla and Ceuta) in all these schemes.

The third sphere, that of local entities and local government, comprises three different subdivisions of Spain, with differing political (council), electoral (constituency), or administrative (decentralised services of the state) functions as well as other entities described below. Accordingly Spain is divided territorially into:

- 8,131 municipalities and 3,683 sub-municipal entitles each with political, administrative and are their own constituencies.
- 465 comarcas, 83 of which have administrative and political functions
- 50 provinces, nine of which have no political or administrative function but all of which are constituencies for both houses of Parliament.

In practice most local government power is vested in municipalities; provincial councils are limited to providing support for smaller municipalities. Nevertheless (and ignoring the lack of administrative function in nine provinces) taken together, the 50 provinces, 7 islands and two autonomous cities are defined as third-level subdivisions by NUTS and OECD. The 50 provinces by themselves are defined as second-level by FIPS, CIA World Factbook and ISO 3166-2. Comarcas are not featured in any of these schemes.

Although municipalities are required by law to not cross provincial boundaries, comarcas have no such restriction, so there is no perfect division of provinces into comarcas; they are disjoint divisions made up of different municipalities. For example, the comarca of Tierra de Pinares is split between two provinces and the comarca of Cerdanya is divided between France and Spain.

Both provinces and comarcas are groupings of municipalities. There are other groupings of municipalities with administrative functions defined by regional legislation including mancomunidades, metropolitan areas, juntas etc but they are not a territorial or administrative subdivision of Spain as a whole.

Related to provinces, there is another territorial division of Spain into 431 judicial districts which are the constituencies for the election of provincial councils.

In terms of the separation of powers, the national government contains all three branches of government (judiciary, executive and legislative); regional governments only have executive and (unicameral) legislative branches (no judiciary). Local government is administrative only and their regulations must adhere to national and regional law.

In terms of relative size of each tier, in 2002, the central government accounted for 48.7% of public expenditure, regional government for 35.5% and local government for 15.8%.

== Decentralisation model ==
It has been suggested that the territorial model is the most imprecise and deliberately ambiguous area of the Constitution due to unresolved controversy and political tensions when it was being negotiated. Although Spain is considered one of the most decentralised countries in Europe, its form is not defined in the Constitution and has been the subject of much debate. In the absence of an explicit definition the Constitutional Court has labeled the model the "State of Autonomous Communities", to avoid implying either a unitary or federal model. Scholars have described the model as a third way between federalism and unitarianism, as a federal system in all but name, or "federation without federalism", as a "multinational quasi federal unitary state" and as a system providing significant degree of decentralisation, though still under strict surveillance by the central government.

In addition to the term "State of Autonomous Communities", various writers have sought to find terms for the Spanish model of decentralisation including "Regionalised State", "Plural State", "Autonomous State", "Unitary Federal State", "Regional Unitary State", "Semi-federal, semi-regional or semi-centralized State", "Federal-regional State", "Autonomous State with federalist nuances", "Unitary State with a federalist spirit" and "Integral State".

A more recent assessment is

Among political scientists and other foreign scholars, there seems to be a consensus that the Spanish model can be regarded as a federal system with certain peculiarities...

The powers that belong exclusively to the state are defined in the Constitution and those that can be assumed by the regional governments in their statutes of autonomy can include housing, urban and regional planning, agriculture, transport, health, education, social welfare and culture. However, the Constitution provides a general framework only, (Note: a list of powers can be found at the end of) and there is now a large body of case-law produced by the Constitutional Court to clarify ambiguities. It is considered impossible to understand the functioning of the system without considering the Court's case law.

Not all regions have the same powers so the system is termed asymmetric which is on the whole seen as advantageous, able to respond to diversity. However one aspect of this asymmetry is a cause of friction, namely that the Basque Country and Navarra can raise their own taxes and negotiate a transfer to Madrid to pay for common services and hence, unlike the other regions, do not contribute to fiscal equalisation across Spain.

Numerous powers are shared between national and regional governments such as the regulation of education, municipal supervision, social services and universities. The result can be confusing and has brought about major conflict as the actual power of autonomous communities can be eroded and centralised by the State's legislative and executive.

With respect to local government, although the broad framework for local government is defined in the Local Government Act, the details are defined by both national and regional law and are mainly allocated to municipalities. In spite of the apparent prominence of provinces in the Constitution, in practice the powers of provinces and other groupings of municipalities are limited to the support for smaller municipalities At least two authors describe provinces as a second tier of local government, to emphasise the function of support.

== Local government political division ==
Local government means the councils administering the multitude of "local entities", which are primarily municipalities , but also groups of municipalities including provinces, islands, metropolitan areas, comarcas, mancomunidades, metropolitan areas and sub-municipal groups known as Minor local entities (Spanish: Entidad de Ámbito Territorial Inferior al Municipio).

In practice most power is vested in municipalities; provinces and comarcas are limited to providing support for smaller municipalities.

The first draft of the 1978 Constitution proposed the abolition of provinces. Their existence in the final version was a particularly ambiguous compromise during constitutional negotiations whereby the older system of provinces was sought by those desirous of a unitary structure, as a means of controlling the territory from the centre, while those seeking a more federal structure wanted territorial autonomy including a right to make their own territorial subdivisions. Another writer says that provinces, as instruments of centralist thinking, are anomalous in a constitution that created a framework of autonomous communities.

Provincial councils have been controversial even before the current Constitution. Provincial councils are not directly elected, and there remains overlap and duplication of services. A senior bureaucrat has claimed that provincial councils are a superfluous and unnecessary layer of government. Another writer has said that provincial councils really only serve the interests of political parties, by distributing paid positions to party members or their associates.

Nine of the 50 provinces have no political or administrative function, ie no provincial council. In six (Asturias, Cantabria, La Rioja, Madrid, Murcia, and Navarre), provincial functions are assumed by the regional government because the boundaries are identical. In the three provinces of the Balearic Islands and the Canary Islands, the functions of a provincial councils are divided between a separate body in each island called an island council (Cabildo insular and Concejo insular) and the regional government. The autonomous cities of Ceuta and Melilla are not in any province.

The Local Government Act allows each region to determine the activities of provincial councils. The Statute of Autonomy of Catalonia of 2006 transferred all political and administrative functions of provincial councils to the regional government with the aim of transferring these powers to a new entity called the verguerie, under further legislation. However in 2010, the Constitutional Court disallowed the extinguishment of provincial powers.

Territorial boundaries are not necessarily coincident because the creation, suppression and modification of boundaries of municipalities, comarcas and other groupings of municipalities is in the hands of the regional governments while only the central government can change boundaries of a province and the boundaries of regions are defined in their statutes of autonomy. For example, one legally defined comarca, Cerdanya, is divided between two states, the southwestern half being counted as a comarca of Spain, while the northeastern half is part of France.

== Nomenclature of subdivisions ==
The use of territorial units or geographical boundaries for statistics, European policy development and funding, and for other geospatial purposes is distinct from the jurisdictional powers given to the three spheres of government. For statistical purposes, the autonomous communities and provinces are invariably used, notwithstanding the limited powers allocated to the provincial councils relative to municipalities or the fact that nine provinces have no administrative or political function because their functions are assumed by other entities.

For example Eurostat uses the Nomenclature of Territorial Units for Statistics system. The NUTS level 2 and OECD territorial level 2 is the autonomous community and autonomous cities (19 in all) and NUTS level 3 and OECD territorial level 3 include the 50 provinces, seven islands and two autonomous cities (59 in all). NUTS also has two divisions of local administration which are the provinces again (termed local administration unit level 1) and the municipalities (local administration unit level 2) which does not reflect their jurisdicational powers.

Using a different numeration scheme the US Federal Information Processing Standards region codes defines the autonomous communities and cities as first-level subdivisions (19 in all) but only the 50 provinces as second-level (omitting the seven islands and two autonomous cities). As well the CIA World Factbook uses the term 'first-order administrative division' to refer to autonomous communities. Similarly the UN's Second Administrative Level Boundaries data set project (SALB) for monitoring development goals defines the first subnational level as the autonomous communities and cities.

With similar terminology, ISO 3166-2 defines first-level subdivisions as the autonomous communities and cities (19 in all) and second-level are 50 provinces (does not count the islands or autonomous cities in this division).

== Bibliography ==
- Anderson, Paul (2020). "Decentralisation at a Crossroads: Spain, Catalonia and the Territorial Crisis" (PDF). Ethnopolitics. 19 (4). London: Routledge: 342–355. doi:10.1080/17449057.2020.1795470. ISSN 1744-9065. OCLC 300873767.
- Arbós i Marín, Xavier (November 2013). "The Federal Option and Constitutional Management of Diversity in Spain". In López-Eguren, Alberto; Escajedo San Epifanio, Leire (eds.). The Ways of Federalism in Western Countries and the Horizons of Territorial Autonomy in Spain (volume 2). Springer. pp. 375–399. doi:10.1007/978-3-642-27717-7_27. ISBN 978-3-642-27716-0.
- Arzoz, Xabier (2012). "New developments in Spanish federalism". L'Europe en Formation. 363 (1). Centre international de formation européenne: 179–188. ISSN 2410-9231. OCLC 1404651662.
- Albet i Mas, Abel (2019). "The municipal map in Spain: structure, evolution and problems". Geopolitica(s). Revista de estudios sobre espacio y poder (in Spanish). 10 (1): 11–40. doi:10.5209/GEOP.63834. hdl:2072/440173.
- Agranoff, Robert (2005). "Federal Asymmetry and Intergovernmental Relations in Spain" (PDF). Asymmetry Series Working Papers (17). Institute of Intergovernmental Relations.
- Canel, Maria Jose (1994). "Local government in the Spanish autonomic state". Local Government Studies. 20 (1). London: Frank Cass: 44–59. doi:10.1080/03003939408433710.
- Casanas Adam, Elisenda (2017). "The Constitutional Court of Spain: From System Balancer to Polarizing Centralist". In Aroney, Nicholas; Kincaid, John (eds.). Courts in Federal Countries. University of Toronto Press. p. 367-403. ISBN 978-1-4875-1466-2.
- Casanova, Julián; Gil Andrés, Carlos (2014). Twentieth-century Spain. A History. Translated by Douch, Martin. Cambridge University Press. ISBN 978-1-107-60267-0. OCLC 870438787.
- Colino, César (2020). "Decentralization in Spain: federal evolution and performance of the estado autonómico". In Muro, Diego; Lago, Ignacio (eds.). The Oxford Handbook of Spanish Politics. Oxford University Press. pp. 62–81. ISBN 978-0-19-882693-4.
- Colomer, Josep M. (1998). "The Spanish 'state of autonomies': Non-institutional federalism". West European Politics. 21 (4): 40–52. doi:10.1080/01402389808425270.
- Cools, Marc; Verbeek, Leen (19–21 March 2013). Local and regional democracy in Spain. Council of Europe.
- Heywood, Paul (August 2000). "Spanish Regionalism: A case study". Regional Government in France and Spain (PDF) (Report). Josep Rowntree Foundation.
- Keating, Michael (2007). "Federalism and the Balance of Power in European States" (PDF). Support for Improvement in Governance and Management. OECD.
- Linde Paniagua, Enrique (2018). "Las Diputaciones Provinciales y su Futuro Incierto" [The Provincial Councils and their uncertain future] (PDF). Teoría y Realidad Constitucional [Theory and Constitutional Reality] (in Spanish). 41. Madrid: National University of Distance Education: 113–135. ISSN 1139-5583. OCLC 971953924.
- Moreno, Luis (2007). "Federalisation in Multinational Spain". In Burgess, Michael; Pinder, John (eds.). Multinational Federations (1st ed.). Routledge. pp. 86–107. doi:10.4324/9780203964514. hdl:10261/177010. ISBN 978-0-415-41490-6. OCLC 1257713892. Archived from the original on 8 March 2022.
- Moreno, Angel M. (June 2016). Merloni, Francesco (ed.). Regionalisation Trends in European Countries 2007-2015: Spain. Congress of Local and Regional Authorities of The Council of Europe. pp. 183–191.
- Olmeda Gomez, Jose A.; Colino, César (2012). "The Limits of Flexibility for Constitutional Change and the Uses of Sub-national Constitutional Space". In Benz, Arthur; Knüpling, Felix (eds.). Changing Federal Institutions. Lessons from International Comparison. Barbara Budrich. pp. 191–209. doi:10.2307/j.ctvddzh07.14.
- Rosselló Villalonga, Joan (2001). "Non–institutional federalism in Spain" (PDF). Papeles de Trabajo [Working papers]. Instituto de Estudios Fiscales [Institute of Fiscal Studies].
- Sánchez Morón, Miguel (January 2017). "¿Deben suprimirse las diputaciones provinciales?" [Should provincial councils be abolished?]. El Cronista del Estado Social y Democrático de Derecho (in Spanish). 65. Iustel. ISSN 1889-0016.
- Zafra Víctor, Manuel (2004). "Reflexiones sobre el gobierno local" [Reflections on local government] (PDF). Anuario del Gobierno Local (in Spanish) (1). Barcelona: Institut de Dret Públic. ISBN 84-609-5895-7. ISSN 2013-4924. Archived from the original (pdf) on 9 August 2016.
- "Eurostat regional yearbook 2022". European Commission.
- "Spain - Summary". Division of Powers. European Committee of the Regions.
- "The Spanish Constitution" (PDF). Agencia Estatal Boletín Oficial del Estado [National Agency of the Official State Gazette]. 1978.
- "Local Government in Spain" (PDF). Ministry of Public Administration.
- "Local Government Act (Organic Law 7/1985)" (in Spanish). Agencia Estatal Boletín Oficial del Estado [National Agency of the Official State Gazette]. 1985. pp. 8945–8964.
- "Synopsis of Article 137 of the Spanish Constitucion" (in Spanish). Congreso de los Diputados [Congress of Deputies]. 2011.

== See also ==
- History of the territorial organization of Spain
- 1833 territorial division of Spain
- Nationalities and regions of Spain
