= Provinces of Spain =

Second-level administrative divisions of Spain

- Category: Province
- Location: Kingdom of Spain
- Found in: Autonomous communities
- Created by: Royal Decree (30/11/1833)
- Created: 1833
- Number: 50
- Populations: 95,258–6,458,684
- Areas: 1,980–21,766 km^{2}
- Government: Provincial council
- Subdivisions: Municipalities

A province in Spain (Note: Spanish: provincias, IPA: [pɾoˈβinθjas]; sing. provincia); Basque probintziak (IPA: [pɾobints̻iak], sing. probintzia.; Catalan províncies (IPA: [pɾuˈβinsiəs]), sing. província.; Galician provincias (IPA: [pɾoˈβinθjɐs]), sing. provincia.) is a territorial division defined as a collection of municipalities. The current provinces of Spain correspond by and large to the provinces created under the purview of the 1833 territorial re-organization of Spain, with a similar predecessor from 1822 (during the Trienio Liberal) and an earlier precedent in the 1810 Napoleonic division of Spain into 84 prefectures. There are many other groupings of municipalities that comprise the local government of Spain.

The boundaries of provinces can only be altered by the Spanish Parliament, giving rise to the common view that the 17 autonomous communities are subdivided into 50 provinces. In reality, the system is not hierarchical but defined according to jurisdiction (Spanish: competencias).

The body charged with government and administration of a province is the provincial council, but their existence is controversial. As the province is defined as a "local entity" in the Constitution, the Provincial council belongs to the sphere of local government.

== Provincial organization ==
The layout of Spain's provinces closely follows the pattern of the territorial division of the country carried out in 1833. The only major change of provincial borders since that time has been the division of the Province of Canary Islands into the provinces of Las Palmas and Santa Cruz de Tenerife.

Historically, the provinces served mainly as transmission belts for policies enacted in Madrid, as Spain was a highly centralised state for most of its modern history. The provinces were the "building-blocks" from which the autonomous communities were created following processes defined in the 1978 Constitution. Consequently, no province is divided between these communities.

The importance of the provinces has declined since the adoption of the system of autonomous communities in the period of the Spanish transition to democracy. They nevertheless remain electoral districts for national elections.

Provinces are also used as geographical references: for instance in postal addresses and telephone codes. National media will also frequently use the province to disambiguate small towns or communities whose names occur frequently throughout Spain. A small town would normally be identified as being in, say, Valladolid province rather than the autonomous community of Castile and León. In addition, organisations outside Spain use provinces for statistical analysis and policy making and in comparison with other countries including NUTS, OECD, FIPS, CIA World Factbook, ISO 3166-2 and the UN's Second Administrative Level Boundaries data set project (SALB).

Most of the provinces are named after their capital town, with the exceptions of Asturias, Cantabria, the Balearic Islands, La Rioja, and Navarre — which are autonomous communities consisting of a single province — as well as the historically autonomous Álava, Biscay and Gipuzkoa. The names of the provinces of Las Palmas and Castellón are taken from their respective capital cities, but shortened. In almost all cases, the capital of the province is also its biggest settlement, with the exception of the provinces of Pontevedra (Vigo), Cádiz (Jerez), and Asturias (capital is Oviedo, but largest city is Gijón). Only two capitals of autonomous communities —Mérida in Extremadura and Santiago de Compostela in Galicia — are not also the capitals of provinces.

Seven of the autonomous communities comprise no more than one province each: Asturias, the Balearic Islands, Cantabria, La Rioja, Madrid, Murcia, and Navarre. These are sometimes referred to as "uniprovincial" communities. Ceuta, Melilla, and the plazas de soberanía are not part of any province.

A map of Spain's provinces (names are shown in Spanish). Ceuta and Melilla were formerly part of Cádiz and Málaga provinces respectively, but are currently not part of any province.

== List of provinces ==
The table below lists the provinces of Spain. For each, the capital city is given, together with an indication of the autonomous community to which it belongs and a link to a list of municipalities in the province. The names of the provinces and their capitals are ordered alphabetically according to the form in which they appear in the main Wikipedia articles describing them. Unless otherwise indicated, their Spanish-language names are the same; locally valid names in Spain's other co-official languages (Basque, Catalan, which is officially called Valencian in the Valencian Community, Galician) are also indicated where they differ.

Autonomous community	Province name	Capital	Lists of municipalities
Andalusia (Note: Spanish: Andalucía) (8 provinces)	Almería	Almería	Municipalities
Andalusia (8 provinces)	Cádiz	Cádiz	Municipalities
Andalusia (8 provinces)	Córdoba	Córdoba	Municipalities
Andalusia (8 provinces)	Granada	Granada	Municipalities
Andalusia (8 provinces)	Huelva	Huelva	Municipalities
Andalusia (8 provinces)	Jaén	Jaén	Municipalities
Andalusia (8 provinces)	Málaga	Málaga	Municipalities
Andalusia (8 provinces)	Seville (Note: Spanish: Sevilla)	Seville	Municipalities
Aragon (Note: Spanish: Aragón) (3 provinces)	Huesca	Huesca	Municipalities
Aragon (3 provinces)	Teruel	Teruel	Municipalities
Aragon (3 provinces)	Zaragoza	Zaragoza	Municipalities
Asturias (Note: Asturian: Asturies Spanish: Asturias) (1 province)		Oviedo (Note: Asturian: Uviéu Spanish: Oviedo)	Municipalities
Balearic Islands (Note: Catalan: Illes Balears Spanish: Islas Baleares) (1 province)		Palma	Municipalities
Basque Country (Note: Basque: Euskadi Spanish: País Vasco) (3 provinces)	Álava (Note: Basque: Araba Spanish: Álava)	Vitoria-Gasteiz (Note: Basque: Gasteiz Spanish: Vitoria)	Municipalities
Basque Country (3 provinces)	Biscay (Note: Basque: Bizkaia Spanish: Vizcaya)	Bilbao (Note: Basque: Bilbo Spanish: Bilbao)	Municipalities
Basque Country (3 provinces)	Gipuzkoa (Note: Basque: Gipuzkoa Spanish: Guipúzcoa)	San Sebastián (Note: Basque: Donostia Spanish: San Sebastián)	Municipalities
Canary Islands (Note: Spanish: Islas Canarias) (2 provinces)	Las Palmas	Las Palmas	Municipalities
Canary Islands (2 provinces)	Santa Cruz de Tenerife	Santa Cruz de Tenerife	Municipalities
Cantabria (1 province)		Santander	Municipalities
Castile and León (Note: Spanish: Castilla y León) (9 provinces)	Ávila	Ávila	Municipalities
Castile and León (9 provinces)	Burgos	Burgos	Municipalities
Castile and León (9 provinces)	León	León	Municipalities
Castile and León (9 provinces)	Palencia	Palencia	Municipalities
Castile and León (9 provinces)	Salamanca	Salamanca	Municipalities
Castile and León (9 provinces)	Segovia	Segovia	Municipalities
Castile and León (9 provinces)	Soria	Soria	Municipalities
Castile and León (9 provinces)	Valladolid	Valladolid	Municipalities
Castile and León (9 provinces)	Zamora	Zamora	Municipalities
Castilla-La Mancha (5 provinces)	Albacete	Albacete	Municipalities
Castilla-La Mancha (5 provinces)	Ciudad Real	Ciudad Real	Municipalities
Castilla-La Mancha (5 provinces)	Cuenca	Cuenca	Municipalities
Castilla-La Mancha (5 provinces)	Guadalajara	Guadalajara	Municipalities
Castilla-La Mancha (5 provinces)	Toledo	Toledo	Municipalities
Catalonia (Note: Catalan: Catalunya Occitan: Catalonha Spanish: Cataluña) (4 provinces)	Barcelona	Barcelona	Municipalities
Catalonia (4 provinces)	Girona (Note: Catalan: Girona Spanish: Gerona)	Girona	Municipalities
Catalonia (4 provinces)	Lleida (Note: Catalan: Lleida Occitan: Lhèida Spanish: Lérida)	Lleida	Municipalities
Catalonia (4 provinces)	Tarragona	Tarragona	Municipalities
Extremadura (2 provinces)	Badajoz	Badajoz	Municipalities
Extremadura (2 provinces)	Cáceres	Cáceres	Municipalities
Galicia (Note: Galician: Galiza Spanish: Galicia) (4 provinces)	A Coruña (Note: Galician: A Coruña Spanish: La Coruña)	A Coruña	Municipalities
Galicia (4 provinces)	Lugo	Lugo	Municipalities
Galicia (4 provinces)	Ourense (Note: Galician: Ourense Spanish: Orense)	Ourense	Municipalities
Galicia (4 provinces)	Pontevedra	Pontevedra	Municipalities
La Rioja (1 province)		Logroño	Municipalities
Community of Madrid (1 province)		Madrid	Municipalities
Murcia (1 province)		Murcia	Municipalities
Navarre (Note: Basque: Nafarroa Spanish: Navarra) (1 province)		Pamplona (Note: Basque: Iruña Spanish: Pamplona)	Municipalities
Valencian Community (Note: Valencian: Comunitat Valenciana Spanish: Comunidad Valenciana) (3 provinces)	Alicante (Note: Valencian: Alacant Spanish: Alicante)	Alicante	Municipalities
Valencian Community (3 provinces)	Castellón (Note: Valencian: Castelló Spanish: Castellón)	Castellón de la Plana	Municipalities
Valencian Community (3 provinces)	Valencia (Note: Valencian: València Spanish: Valencia)	Valencia	Municipalities

Native names:

== Bibliography ==
- "The Spanish Constitution" (PDF). Agencia Estatal Boletín Oficial del Estado. 1978.
- "Local Government Act (Organic Law 7/1985)" (in Spanish). Agencia Estatal Boletín Oficial del Estado. 1985.
- Zafra Víctor, Manuel (2004). "Reflexiones sobre el gobierno local" [Reflections on local government] (PDF). Anuario del Gobierno Local (in Spanish) (1). Barcelona: Institut de Dret Públic. ISBN 84-609-5895-7. ISSN 2013-4924. Archived from the original (pdf) on 2016-08-09.
- "Local Government in Spain" (PDF). Ministry of Public Administration.

== See also ==
- Political divisions of Spain
- Local government in Spain
- Autonomous communities of Spain
- Comarcas of Spain
- ISO 3166-2:ES
- List of provincial flags of Spain
- Ranked lists of Spanish provinces
- Spanish Federation of Municipalities and Provinces
