= Provincial deputation (Spain) =

Institution charged with local government and administration in Spain

A provincial council (also sometimes translated literally as provincial deputation, Spanish: diputación provincial or provincial assembly) is the administrator and governing body of a province of Spain. It is one of the entities that make up local government in Spain. The council is made up of a president, vice presidents, an executive committee and the plenary assembly of deputies.

== Function ==
The role of a provincial council is limited to:

- providing legal, economic and technical assistance and co-operation to municipalities, particularly those with more limited economic and managerial resources;
- coordinating municipal services in order to ensure the provision of compulsory minimum services;
- providing public services extending to several municipalities and municipal associations (Spanish: comarcas and mancomunidades);
- promoting provincial interests.

Similar functions are exercised by the cabildos in the Canary and Balearic Islands.

With the creation of the autonomous communities, provincial councils have lost much of their power, and have a very limited scope of actions, with the exception of the Basque Country, where provinces are known as historical territories and their government bodies retain more powers.

== Fiscal arrangements ==
Central grants represent 84% of the income of provincial councils; other sources of funds are insignificant. They include small portions of the income tax, value-added tax, payments from municipalities, some other minor taxes such as a levy surcharge on the municipal business tax, and a motor vehicle tax. They can borrow if authorised by the state or their autonomous community and then only for investment purposes.

== By autonomous community ==
Nine of the 50 provinces have no provincial councils for the reasons explained below.

There are provincial councils in the 41 provinces that make up the autonomous communities of Galicia, Aragon, Catalonia, Valencian Community, Castile and León, Castilla–La Mancha, Extremadura, and Andalusia. The Basque Country has what are known as diputaciones forales (English: chartered councils).

Autonomous communities with only one province (Asturias, Cantabria, Community of Madrid, Murcia, La Rioja, and Navarre) do not have provincial councils as the government of the region handles all of their functions. (Note: Before the establishment of autonomous communities in the 1980s, the provinces of Logroño (currently La Rioja), Madrid and Murcia, Oviedo (currently Asturias) and Santander (currently Cantabria) had a provincial deputation. Before the establishment of Navarra as Chartered Community, it had a diputación foral.)

In the two provinces of the Canary Islands instead of a provincial council each island has a cabildo insular (island council). Similarly, in the province of the Balearic Islands, instead of a provincial council each island has a consell insular (island council). These island councils perform functions similar to those of provincial councils.

== Electoral process ==
The deputies are elected from the general public by the municipal councillors (Spanish: concejales) that make up the province, not directly by the populace. The number of deputies is determined in proportion to the number of inhabitants in each of the judicial districts using the D'Hondt method. Each judicial district covers a number of municipalities.

The number of deputies per province depends on population and is given as follows:

Population	Deputies
Up to 500,000	25
500,001–1,000,000	27
1,000,001–3,500,000	31
More than 3,500,000	51

The only exception to this is the chartered councils of the three Basque provinces, where the deputies are elected directly by the people via proportional representation. The president is elected in the inaugural session of the council from amongst their number. The president selects the vice presidents and the executive committee.

== Criticism ==
According to one academic, provincial councils have been, since their creation, the most controversial of Spain's public institutions. According to this criticism, they were neither conceived to serve the interests of the public nor for promoting provincial development. Their only concrete function in law is to support smaller municipalities. Purportedly they only serve the interests of political parties, by distributing paid positions to party members or their associates. This is because, indirectly elected, the deputies and office holders are in practice decided by the top officials in the larger political parties, the author says. Spain has declared itself not bound to the full extent by the requirement for direct elections of all local authorities.

Another academic says provinces are the realm of clientelism and "parking" of politicians that is scarcely justifiable.

A senior bureaucrat has claimed that provincial councils are a superfluous and unnecessary layer of government.

A 2013 European report criticised the overlap in responsibilities between various government levels.

In 2018 a number of political parties called for the abolition of provincial councils.

== Bibliography ==
- ABC_CValenciana (28 June 2018). "Podemos pide suprimir las diputaciones tras el caso de corrupción del PSOE y Compromís" [Podemos wants to abolish the provincial councils following the corruption cases of PSOE and Compromís] (in Spanish). ABC.
- Canel, Maria Jose (1994). "Local government in the Spanish autonomic state". Local Government Studies. 20 (1). London: Frank Cass: 44–59. doi:10.1080/03003939408433710.
- Cools, Marc; Verbeek, Leen (19–21 March 2013). Local and regional democracy in Spain. Council of Europe.
- Hooghe, Liesbet; Marks, Gary; Schakel, Arjan; Osterkatz, Sandra Chapman; Niedzwiecki, Sara; Shair-Rosenfield, Sarah (2016). Measuring Regional Authority: A Postfunctionalist Theory of Governance: Volume I. Oxford: Oxford University Press.
- Linde Paniagua, Enrique (2018). "Las Diputaciones Provinciales y su Futuro Incierto" [The Provincial Councils and their uncertain future] (PDF). Teoría y Realidad Constitucional (in Spanish). 41 (41): 113–135. doi:10.5944/trc.41.2018.22119.
- Rodríguez Álvarez, José Manuel (2010). "Estructura institucional y organización territorial local en España: fragmentación municipal, asociacionismo confuso, grandes ciudades y provincias supervivientes" [Institutional structure and local territorial organisation in Spain: municipal fragmentation, confusing associations, large cities and surviving provinces]. Política y Sociedad (in Spanish). 47 (3). Madrid: Complutense University of Madrid: 67–91. ISSN 1130-8001.
- Sánchez Morón, Miguel (January 2017). "¿Deben suprimirse las diputaciones provinciales?" [Should provincial councils be abolished?]. El Cronista del Estado Social y Democrático de Derecho (in Spanish). 65. Iustel. ISSN 1889-0016.
- Zafra Víctor, Manuel (2004). "Reflexiones sobre el gobierno local" [Reflections on local government] (PDF). Anuario del Gobierno Local (in Spanish) (1). Barcelona: Institut de Dret Públic. ISBN 84-609-5895-7. ISSN 2013-4924. Archived from the original (pdf) on 2016-08-09.
- "The Spanish Constitution" (PDF). Agencia Estatal Boletín Oficial del Estado. 1978.
- "Local Government Act (Organic Law 7/1985), Basic Principles of Local Government" (in Spanish). Agencia Estatal Boletín Oficial del Estado. 1985. pp. 8945–8964.
