= List of OECD countries by GDP per capita =

This article includes two lists of Organisation for Economic Co-operation and Development (OECD) member states sorted by their gross domestic product per capita, the value of all final goods and services produced within a nation in a given year, converted to U.S. dollars, divided by the average (or mid-year) population for the same year.

Country	2026 PPP (IMF)	2026 Nominal (IMF)	2025 PPP (OECD)
Australia	$74,755	$75,648	$75,328
Austria	$78,334	$67,761	$77,035
Belgium	$78,334	$65,112	$74,910
Canada	$70,006	$60,305	$66,783
Chile	$37,336	$20,240	$37,125
Colombia	$23,576	$10,104	$23,233
Costa Rica	$34,157	$20,299	-
Czech Republic	$63,550	$39,795	$60,464
Denmark	$89,667	$83,445	$84,752
Estonia	$51,653	$37,718	$52,289
Finland	$68,861	$60,130	$66,102
France	$68,567	$52,083	$63,974
Germany	$76,747	$65,303	$75,386
Greece	$47,175	$29,696	$44,732
Hungary	$50,570	$28,430	$49,838
Iceland	$82,730	$110,048	$83,539
Ireland	$159,129	$140,186	$146,688
Israel	$59,095	$69,804	$60,379
Italy	$65,761	$46,505	$62,768
Japan	$59,207	$35,703	$55,488
South Korea	$68,624	$37,412	$63,167
Latvia	$45,840	$28,913	$46,380
Lithuania	$61,052	$36,545	$56,838
Luxembourg	$156,719	$158,733	$156,526
Mexico	$26,643	$15,779	$26,117
Netherlands	$87,773	$79,918	$86,657
New Zealand	$58,308	$52,023	$57,261
Norway	$115,548	$105,877	$104,079
Poland	$59,792	$31,336	$53,133
Portugal	$52,841	$35,434	$53,146
Slovakia	$49,466	$31,242	$48,925
Slovenia	$60,664	$40,630	$59,789
Spain	$59,187	$41,563	$59,919
Sweden	$77,094	$70,676	$72,816
Switzerland	$105,680	$126,177	$102,489
Turkey	$46,672	$19,018	$43,953
United Kingdom	$67,585	$61,056	$64,465
United States	$94,430	$94,430	$89,984
