= List of OECD regions by GDP (PPP) per capita =

This is a list of OECD regions by GDP (PPP) per capita, a ranking of subnational entities from members of the Organisation for Economic Co-operation and Development (OECD) by gross domestic product at purchasing power parity prices per capita.

The 418 areas shown below are "territorial level 2" (TL2) regions.

Data are in current 2020 international dollars.

Highest fourth
Upper-mid (2nd to 3rd quartile)
Lower-mid (1st to 2nd quartile)
Lowest fourth

Country	Region code	Region	GDP (PPP) per capita (Int$)	Year
United States	US11	District of Columbia	221,877	2023
Ireland	IE02	Southern	144,906	2022
Ireland	IE03	Northern and Western	125,399	2022
Luxembourg	LU00	Luxembourg	128,066	2022
Czech Republic	CZ01	Prague	106,664	2022
Germany	DE6	Hamburg	100,853	2022
Belgium	BE1	Brussels Capital Region	99,407	2022
Denmark	DK01	Capital Region	95,044	2022
United States	US36	New York	94,779	2023
Australia	AU5	Western Australia	94,333	2023
United Kingdom	UKI	Greater London	92,397	2023
Switzerland	CH04	Zurich	90,707	2022
United States	US25	Massachusetts	90,336	2023
Switzerland	CH07	Ticino	88,601	2022
United States	US53	Washington	88,417	2023
Chile	CL02	Antofagasta	86,924	2023
France	FR1	Ile-de-France	86,893	2022
Canada	CA61	Northwest Territories	85,986	2023
Netherlands	NL32	North Holland	85,575	2022
United States	US06	California	85,426	2023
Italy	ITH1	South Tyrol	84,198	2023
Sweden	SE11	Stockholm	83,894	2022
Canada	CA62	Nunavut	83,741	2023
Poland	PL13	Warsaw	83,333	2022
Hungary	HU1	Budapest	82,318	2022
United States	US38	North Dakota	81,480	2023
Netherlands	NL31	Utrecht	81,202	2022
United States	US09	Connecticut	81,054	2023
Switzerland	CH03	Northwestern Switzerland	80,789	2022
Switzerland	CH06	Central Switzerland	79,831	2022
United States	US02	Alaska	79,131	2023
Australia	AU7	Northern Territory (NT)	78,252	2023
United States	US10	Delaware	78,172	2023
United States	US31	Nebraska	77,727	2023
Slovakia	SK01	Bratislava Region	76,434	2022
United States	US08	Colorado	76,306	2023
Switzerland	CH01	Lake Geneva Region	75,525	2022
Austria	AT32	Salzburg	75,202	2022
Austria	AT34	Vorarlberg	74,497	2022
Germany	DE5	Bremen	74,397	2022
United States	US17	Illinois	74,373	2023
United States	US34	New Jersey	74,147	2023
United States	US56	Wyoming	74,035	2023
United States	US48	Texas	72,430	2023
Austria	AT13	Vienna	72,227	2022
United States	US24	Maryland	71,439	2023
Finland	FI1B	Helsinki-Uusimaa	70,915	2022
United States	US27	Minnesota	70,869	2023
Australia	AU8	Australian Capital Territory (ACT)	70,859	2023
Switzerland	CH02	Espace Mittelland	70,731	2022
Germany	DE2	Bavaria	70,510	2022
Switzerland	CH05	Eastern Switzerland	70,381	2022
United States	US51	Virginia	69,920	2023
Norway	NO01	Oslo and Viken	69,638	2020
Italy	ITC4	Lombardy	69,080	2023
United States	US49	Utah	68,738	2023
United States	US33	New Hampshire	68,295	2023
Canada	CA48	Alberta	68,017	2023
Canada	CA60	Yukon	67,962	2023
United States	US46	South Dakota	67,894	2023
Netherlands	NL11	Groningen	67,599	2022
Netherlands	NL41	North Brabant	67,591	2022
Germany	DE7	Hesse	66,997	2022
United States	US19	Iowa	66,896	2023
Germany	DE1	Baden-Württemberg	66,888	2022
Italy	ITH2	Trentino	66,763	2022
Sweden	SE33	Upper Norrland	66,680	2022
United States	US20	Kansas	66,243	2023
Italy	ITC2	Aosta Valley	66,127	2022
Lithuania	LT1	Vilnius County	65,659	2022
Austria	AT33	Tyrol	65,395	2022
United States	US15	Hawaii	64,872	2023
Netherlands	NL33	South Holland	64,694	2022
Austria	AT31	Upper Austria	64,670	2022
United States	US32	Nevada	64,594	2023
United States	US41	Oregon	64,427	2023
United States	US42	Pennsylvania	64,170	2023
Canada	CA47	Saskatchewan	64,047	2023
United States	US39	Ohio	63,820	2023
Germany	DE3	Berlin	63,287	2022
United States	US47	Tennessee	63,279	2023
Iceland	ISL	Iceland	63,154	2023
United States	US13	Georgia	62,936	2023
Belgium	BE2	Flemish Region	62,590	2022
United States	US18	Indiana	62,425	2023
United States	US37	North Carolina	61,001	2023
United States	US44	Rhode Island	60,805	2023
United States	US55	Wisconsin	60,359	2023
United States	US12	Florida	60,206	2023
Italy	ITH5	Emilia-Romagna	60,161	2022
Sweden	SE23	West Sweden	60,129	2022
Spain	ES30	Madrid	59,539	2022
Denmark	DK04	Central Jutland	59,308	2022
Netherlands	NL42	Limburg	59,304	2022
Norway	NO05	Western Norway	59,141	2020
United States	US04	Arizona	58,955	2023
United States	US29	Missouri	58,741	2023
Australia	AU1	New South Wales	58,682	2023
United States	US22	Louisiana	58 340	2023
United Kingdom	UKJ	South East England	58,173	2022
Germany	DEA	North Rhine-Westphalia	57,729	2022
United States	US50	Vermont	57,411	2023
Finland	FI20	Åland	57,406	2022
Austria	AT22	Styria	56,896	2022
Denmark	DK03	Southern Denmark	56,810	2022
South Korea	KR05	Chungcheong region	56,797	2022
United States	US26	Michigan	56,585	2023
Netherlands	NL34	Zeeland	56,448	2022
Sweden	SE32	Central Norrland	56,369	2022
United States	US23	Maine	56,242	2023
Slovenia	SI02	Western Slovenia	56,220	2022
Italy	ITI4	Lazio	56,137	2022
Italy	ITH3	Veneto	56,021	2022
New Zealand	NZ12	Auckland	55,935	2022
Norway	NO06	Trøndelag	55,817	2020
Australia	AU3	Queensland	55,782	2023
Austria	AT21	Carinthia	55,722	2022
Netherlands	NL21	Overijssel	55,561	2022
New Zealand	NZ19	Wellington	55,561	2022
Spain	ES21	Basque Country	55,506	2022
Netherlands	NL22	Gelderland	55,349	2022
France	FRL	Provence-Alpes-Côte d'Azur	55,010	2022
Germany	DE9	Lower Saxony	54,703	2022
Italy	ITH4	Friuli-Venezia Giulia	54,335	2022
Germany	DEB	Rhineland-Palatinate	54,159	2022
United States	US40	Oklahoma	54,030	2023
Turkey	TR10	Istanbul	53,869	2022
Italy	ITC3	Liguria	53,824	2022
United States	US30	Montana	53,683	2023
Austria	AT12	Lower Austria	53,533	2022
Ireland	IE01	Northern and Western	53,434	2022
Sweden	SE21	Småland with Islands	53,394	2022
Sweden	SE12	East Middle Sweden	53,221	2022
Norway	NO07	Northern Norway	53,169	2020
United States	US35	New Mexico	53,072	2023
Australia	AU2	Victoria	53,040	2023
United States	US21	Kentucky	52,888	2023
Italy	ITI1	Tuscany	52,813	2022
Sweden	SE22	South Sweden	52,615	2022
Portugal	PT17	Lisbon metropolitan area	52,451	2022
Canada	CA59	British Columbia	52,426	2023
Spain	ES22	Navarra	52,359	2022
United States	US16	Idaho	52,109	2023
Italy	ITC1	Piedmont	51,711	2022
United States	US45	South Carolina	51,686	2023
New Zealand	NZ25	Southland	51,356	2022
Denmark	DK05	Northern Jutland	51,249	2022
New Zealand	NZ17	Taranaki	51,200	2022
France	FRK	Auvergne-Rhône-Alpes	51,188	2022
Germany	DEC	Saarland	51,171	2022
Sweden	SE31	North Middle Sweden	51,098	2022
Canada	CA10	Newfoundland and Labrador	51,060	2023
South Korea	KR01	Seoul Capital Area	50,696	2022
United States	US01	Alabama	50,639	2023
Canada	CA35	Ontario	50,633	2023
Spain	ES51	Catalonia	50,423	2022
Germany	DEF	Schleswig-Holstein	50,091	2022
United Kingdom	UKM	Scotland	49,981	2022
Japan	JPD	Southern-Kanto	49,946	2021
Finland	FI19	Western Finland	49,642	2022
United States	US05	Arkansas	49,513	2023
Finland	FI1C	Southern Finland	49,078	2022
United Kingdom	UKK	South West England	49,045	2022
United Kingdom	UKH	East of England	48,697	2022
United States	US54	West Virginia	48,452	2023
Netherlands	NL23	Flevoland	48,408	2022
France	FRG	Pays de la Loire	48,386	2022
Spain	ES24	Aragon	48,099	2022
Israel	ISR	Israel	48,038	2022
United Kingdom	UKD	North West England	47,926	2022
Japan	JPF	Tōkai region	47,840	2021
Australia	AU4	South Australia	47,896	2023
Netherlands	NL12	Friesland	47,757	2022
Mexico	ME04	Campeche	47,451	2022
Norway	NO02	Innlandet	47,187	2020
Germany	DED	Saxony	47,073	2022
Norway	NO04	Agder and Sør-Østlandet	46,793	2020
New Zealand	NZ23	Canterbury (NZ)	46,700	2022
South Korea	KR02	Gyeongnam Region	46,681	2022
Italy	ITI3	Marche	46,534	2022
France	FRH	Brittany	46,209	2022
Canada	CA24	Quebec	46,091	2023
Portugal	PT15	Algarve	46,065	2022
Poland	PL51	Lower Silesia	46,011	2022
Spain	ES53	Balearic Islands	45,857	2022
Spain	ES23	La Rioja	45,826	2022
Germany	DE4	Brandenburg	45,392	2022
Netherlands	NL13	Drenthe	45,382	2022
Greece	GR3	Attica	45,203	2022
Japan	JPC	Northern-Kanto, Koshin	45,072	2021
Germany	DEE	Saxony-Anhalt	45,040	2022
France	FRI	Nouvelle-Aquitaine	44,853	2022
United Kingdom	UKE	Yorkshire and The Humber	44,785	2022
South Korea	KR04	Jeolla Region	44,778	2022
Canada	CA46	Manitoba	44,575	2023
Austria	AT11	Burgenland	44,497	2022
France	FRD	Normandy	44,253	2022
France	FRF	Grand Est	44,165	2022
United Kingdom	UKG	West Midlands	43,887	2022
Germany	DEG	Thuringia	43,878	2022
Belgium	BE3	Wallonia	43,878	2022
Turkey	TR42	Eastern Marmara - North	43,834	2022
Australia	AU6	Tasmania	43,770	2023
France	FRJ	Occitanie	43,554	2022
Poland	PL41	Greater Poland	43,426	2022
United Kingdom	UKF	East Midlands	43,254	2022
United Kingdom	UKN	Northern Ireland	43,241	2022
Turkey	TR51	Ankara	43,219	2022
New Zealand	NZ21	Waikato	43,118	2022
Poland	PL22	Silesia	43,053	2022
France	FRC	Bourgogne-Franche-Comté	43,014	2022
New Zealand	NZ24	Otago	42,998	2022
Germany	DE8	Mecklenburg-Vorpommern	42,957	2022
United States	US28	Mississippi	42,922	2023
France	FRB	Centre-Val de Loire	42,705	2022
Estonia	EE00	Estonia	42,677	2022
Italy	ITI2	Umbria	42,653	2022
Italy	ITF5	Basilicata	42,629	2022
New Zealand	NZ21	Tasman, Nelson and Marlborough	42,559	2022
Czech Republic	CZ06	Southeast	42,541	2022
France	FRE	Hauts-de-France	42,540	2022
Mexico	ME09	Mexico City	42,456	2022
Denmark	DK02	Zealand	42,030	2022
Spain	ES41	Castile and León	41,812	2022
South Korea	KR03	Gyeongbuk Region	41,666	2022
Japan	JPE	Hokuriku	41,549	2021
Japan	JPG	Kansai region	41,486	2021
New Zealand	NZ14	Bay of Plenty	41,428	2022
Turkey	TR21	Thrace	41,322	2022
Poland	PL63	Pomerania	41,039	2022
Turkey	TR31	İzmir	40,989	2022
Czech Republic	CZ02	Central Bohemian	40,920	2022
Italy	ITF1	Abruzzo	40,901	2022
Portugal	PT30	Madeira (PT)	40,764	2022
Spain	ES13	Cantabria	40,537	2022
Japan	JPH	Chugoku	40,464	2021
Canada	CA11	Prince Edward Island	40,310	2023
France	FRM	Corsica	40,257	2022
Spain	ES11	Galicia	40,131	2022
Canada	CA13	New Brunswick	39,778	2022
Canada	CA12	Nova Scotia	39,722	2023
Spain	ES12	Asturias	39,772	2022
United Kingdom	UKL	Wales	39,744	2022
South Korea	KR06	Gangwon Region	39,609	2022
Chile	CL01	Tarapacá	38,988	2023
Japan	JPB	Tohoku	38,515	2022
Japan	JPI	Shikoku	38,144	2021
United Kingdom	UKC	North East England	38,976	2022
Poland	PL11	Lodzkie	38,552	2022
Spain	ES52	Valencia	37,911	2022
Czech Republic	CZ03	Southwest	37,823	2022
New Zealand	NZ18	Manawatū-Whanganui	37,774	2022
Latvia	LV00	Latvia	37,773	2022
Czech Republic	CZ07	Central Moravia	37,707	2022
Japan	JPA	Hokkaido	37,704	2021
Poland	PL12	Mazovia regional	37,657	2022
Slovenia	SI01	Eastern Slovenia	37,597	2022
Portugal	PT18	Alentejo	37,435	2022
Italy	ITF2	Molise	37,350	2022
Chile	CL03	Atacama	37,336	2023
France	FRY2	Martinique	37,332	2022
Czech Republic	CZ05	Northeast	37,269	2022
Hungary	HU21	Central Transdanubia	36,676	2022
Czech Republic	CZ08	Moravia-Silesia	36,676	2022
Poland	PL21	Lesser Poland	36,415	2022
Portugal	PT20	Azores (PT)	36,324	2022
Italy	ITG2	Sardinia	36,173	2022
Greece	EL64	Central Greece	36,108	2022
South Korea	KR07	Jeju	35,958	2022
Spain	ES62	Murcia	35,934	2022
Turkey	TR41	Eastern Marmara - South	35,790	2022
Spain	ES63	Ceuta	35,713	2022
Mexico	ME19	Nuevo Leon	35,707	2022
Hungary	HU22	Western Transdanubia	35,372	2022
Lithuania	LT2	Central and Western Lithuania	35,275	2022
Japan	JPJ	Kyushu, Okinawa	35,145	2021
France	FRY1	Guadeloupe	35,024	2022
Spain	ES42	Castile-La Mancha	34,967	2022
Portugal	PT16	Central Portugal	34,713	2022
Portugal	PT11	North (PT)	34,673	2022
Spain	ES70	Canary Islands	34,549	2022
Slovakia	SK02	West Slovakia	33,968	2022
Hungary	HU2	Pest County	33,940	2022
France	FRY3	Réunion	33,875	2022
Greece	EL42	South Aegean	33,715	2022
Poland	PL61	Kuyavian-Pomerania	33,655	2022
Poland	PL42	West Pomerania	33,602	2022
Poland	PL43	Lubusz	33,536	2022
Turkey	TR61	Mediterranean region - West	33,251	2022
Spain	ES43	Extremadura	33,062	2022
Italy	ITF4	Apulia	33,098	2022
Mexico	ME05	Coahuila	32,678	2022
Spain	ES61	Andalusia	32,672	2022
New Zealand	NZ15	Gisborne	32,618	2022
Poland	PL52	Opole	32,560	2022
Italy	ITF3	Campania	32,064	2022
Spain	ES64	Melilla	32,037	2022
New Zealand	NZ11	Northland	31,825	2022
Slovakia	SK03	Central Slovakia	31,423	2022
Czech Republic	CZ04	Northwest	31,123	2022
Mexico	ME26	Sonora	30,668	2022
Italy	ITG1	Sicily	30,354	2022
Poland	PL34	Podlaskie	30,254	2022
Greece	EL53	Western Macedonia	30,238	2022
Turkey	TR22	Southern Marmara - West	30,036	2022
Greece	EL65	Peloponnese	29,748	2022
Colombia	CO03	Bogotá	29,721	2023
Italy	ITF6	Calabria	29,387	2022
Turkey	TR32	Southern Aegean	29,095	2022
Chile	CL11	Aisén	28,815	2023
Hungary	HU33	Southern Great Plain	28,801	2022
Greece	EL62	Ionian Islands	28,755	2022
Colombia	CO25	Casanare	28,774	2023
Poland	PL33	Swietokrzyskie	28,577	2022
Poland	PL62	Warmian-Masuria	28,507	2022
Colombia	CO16	Meta	28,403	2023
Greece	EL43	Crete	28,243	2022
Poland	PL31	Lublin	27,908	2022
Poland	PL32	Podkarpacia	27,879	2022
Turkey	TR33	Northern Aegean	27,760	2022
Turkey	TR62	Mediterranean region - Middle	27,751	2022
Mexico	ME27	Tabasco	27,163	2022
Hungary	HU23	Southern Transdanubia	27,154	2022
Chile	CL12	Magallanes	27,109	2023
Mexico	ME02	Baja California Norte	27,029	2022
Slovakia	SK04	East Slovakia	27,042	2022
Mexico	ME08	Chihuahua	26,990	2022
Greece	EL52	Central Macedonia	26,616	2022
Turkey	TR52	Central Anatolia - West and South	26,580	2022
Mexico	ME22	Queretaro	26,316	2022
Greece	EL61	Thessaly	26,146	2022
Turkey	TR81	Western Black Sea - West	25,933	2022
Hungary	HU32	Northern Great Plain	25,910	2022
Chile	CL13	Santiago	25,876	2023
Hungary	HU31	Northern Hungary	25,793	2022
Colombia	CO21	Santander	25,635	2023
Turkey	TR71	Central Anatolia - Middle	24,646	2022
Greece	EL63	Western Greece	24,478	2022
Turkey	TR72	Central Anatolia - East	24,318	2022
Mexico	ME03	Baja California Sur	24,250	2022
Turkey	TRC1	Southeastern Anatolia - West	24,189	2022
Mexico	ME14	Jalisco	24,018	2022
Mexico	ME01	Aguascalientes	23,779	2022
Greece	EL51	Eastern Macedonia and Thrace	23,752	2022
Greece	EL54	Epirus	23,310	2022
Turkey	TR82	Western Black Sea - Middle and East	23,266	2022
Chile	CL06	O'Higgins	23,216	2023
Mexico	ME28	Tamaulipas	23,114	2022
Mexico	ME06	Colima	22,498	2022
Turkey	TR63	Mediterranean region - East	21,857	2022
Colombia	CO28	San Andres	21,628	2023
Mexico	ME24	San Luis Potosi	21,551	2022
France	FRY3	French Guiana	21,505	2022
Chile	CL04	Coquimbo	20,941	2023
Chile	CL10	Los Lagos	20,621	2023
Greece	EL41	North Aegean	20,542	2022
Colombia	CO01	Antioquia	20,163	2023
Mexico	ME23	Quintana Roo	20,128	2022
Chile	CL05	Valparaíso	20,003	2023
Chile	CL08	Biobío	19,741	2022
Mexico	ME25	Sinaloa	19,721	2022
Colombia	CO24	Valle del Cauca	19,648	2023
Mexico	ME11	Guanajuato	19,610	2022
Turkey	TR83	Middle Black Sea	19,419	2022
Turkey	TRA1	Northeastern Anatolia - West	19,334	2022
Colombia	CO05	Boyacá	19,231	2023
Mexico	ME10	Durango	18,865	2022
Turkey	TR90	Eastern Black Sea	18,406	2022
Turkey	TRB1	Eastern Anatolia - West	17,998	2022
Chile	CL07	Maule	17,657	2023
Mexico	ME31	Yucatan	17,599	2022
Colombia	CO11	Cundinamarca	17,240	2023
Chile	CL14	Los Ríos	17,182	2023
Turkey	TRC3	Southeastern Anatolia - East	16,954	2022
Chile	CL15	Arica and Parinacota	16,562	2023
Colombia	CO25	Arauca	16,378	2023
Colombia	CO20	Risaralda	16,100	2023
Mexico	ME32	Zacatecas	15,999	2022
France	FRY3	Mayotte	15,904	2022
Chile	CL12	Ñuble	15,682	2023
Mexico	ME16	Michoacan	15,666	2022
Colombia	CO04	Bolívar	15,059	2023
Colombia	CO02	Atlántico	14,965	2023
Mexico	ME18	Nayarit	14,956	2022
Mexico	ME13	Hidalgo	14,948	2022
Chile	CL09	Araucanía	14,940	2023
Colombia	CO06	Caldas	14,907	2023
Colombia	CO23	Tolima	14,528	2023
Mexico	ME17	Morelos	14,395	2022
Colombia	CO09	Cesar	14,303	2023
Mexico	ME15	Mexico	14,240	2022
Mexico	ME30	Veracruz	14,165	2022
Colombia	CO19	Quindío	13,964	2023
Mexico	ME21	Puebla	13,942	2022
Turkey	TRA2	Northeastern Anatolia - East	13,638	2022
Colombia	CO13	Huila	13,373	2023
Turkey	TRC2	Southeastern Anatolia - Middle	12,683	2022
Mexico	ME29	Tlaxcala	12,082	2022
Turkey	TRB2	Eastern Anatolia - East	11,936	2022
Colombia	CO14	La Guajira	11,278	2023
Mexico	ME20	Oaxaca	11,224	2022
Colombia	CO08	Cauca	10,861	2023
Mexico	ME12	Guerrero	9,930	2022
Colombia	CO26	Putumayo	9,041	2023
Colombia	CO18	Norte de Santander	8,794	2023
Colombia	CO10	Córdoba	8,734	2023
Colombia	CO15	Magdalena	8,704	2023
Colombia	CO07	Caquetá	8,688	2023
Colombia	CO29	Amazonas	8,366	2023
Colombia	CO17	Nariño	8,204	2023
Colombia	CO31	Guaviare	7,663	2023
Colombia	CO22	Sucre	7,556	2023
Mexico	ME07	Chiapas	7,463	2022
Colombia	CO12	Chocó	6,825	2023
Colombia	CO30	Guainía	5,879	2023
Colombia	CO32	Vaupés	5,370	2023
Colombia	CO33	Vichada	5,134	2023

== See also ==
- List of OECD countries by GDP per capita
- List of countries by GDP (PPP) per capita
- List of countries by GDP (nominal) per capita
