= Local government in Spain =

Local government in Spain refers to the government and administration of what the Constitution calls "local entities", which are primarily municipalities, but also groups of municipalities including provinces, metropolitan areas, comarcas and mancomunidades and sub-municipal groups known as minor local entities (Spanish: Entidad de Ámbito Territorial Inferior al Municipio).

The administration of these entities is mostly provided by a council, each with a different name and set of rules (Spanish: régimen). These councils can be collectively thought of as a third sphere (or tier) of government, the first being the State (Spain) and the second, the regional governments.

The powers enjoyed by local government are defined in both central government and regional government legislation. Consequently and for historical reasons, local government is heterogeneous, not distributed in a balanced way across the nation, involves duplication of services and has even been labelled dysfunctional. The Constitution declares that local government has autonomy which broadly means that the entities have the right to take decisions for the running of local services without political interference from the Regions or from the central government. However the concept has proven difficult to define in a detailed legal way.

Although Spain adheres to the European Charter of Local Self-Government, it declares itself not bound to the full extent by the requirement for direct elections of all local government authorities.

== Governing bodies ==
=== Municipal council ===
The governing and administrative body for most of the municipalities is the Ayuntamiento. The main organ of the Ayuntamiento is the plenary, the deliberative body formed by the elected councillors, and presided by the alcalde (English: Mayor). The mayor is not directly elected, and is invested (and can be removed) by the councillors.

=== Open council ===
The concejo abierto ("open council") is the system used for the government and administration of low-population municipalities and some minor local entities. The government is exercised by a Mayor and the asamblea vecinal ("neighbourhood assembly"), formed by all the electors of the municipality. The Mayor is elected directly by the citizens.

=== Provincial council ===
Provinces are groupings of municipalities. Before the creation of the autonomous communities from 1978 on, provinces were the main administrative entity in Spain other than the central government. The governing and administrative body of the mainland provinces is the diputación provincial ("provincial council"). However, in six of the 17 autonomous communities (Asturias, Cantabria, La Rioja, Madrid, Murcia, and Navarre), the functions of the only provincial council are assumed by the regional government. In the Balearic Islands and the Canary Islands, the functions of a provincial council are assumed by an island council on each island.

A provincial council is made up of a plenary, the deliberative body, and an executive committee formed by the president and the deputies. The provincial councilors are indirectly elected to a 4-year mandate by the municipal councils as function of the results of the municipal elections.

=== Island council ===
In contrast to the rest of Spain, the two provinces of the Canary Islands and the province of the Balearic Islands do not have provincial councils. Instead, each of the seven major islands of the Canaries is administered by a cabildo ('island council') and the four major islands of the Balearic Islands is administered by a consejo insular ('island council'). The functions normally undertaken by a provincial council are divided between the island councils and the regional governments of the respective autonomous communities.

=== Comarcal council ===
Comarcas are groupings of municipalities, established by some regional governments, principally in Catalonia, Aragon, the Basque Country and Galicia but also one in Castile and León, to provide some services. The comarcal council is the local administration and government body in comarcas in Catalonia and Aragon but in Galicia comarcas do not have administrative function.

=== Metropolitan council ===
There are three local entities designated as Metropolitan Areas: Barcelona and two in Valencia, The Metropolitan Area of Barcelona is governed by a Metropolitan Council made up of representatives of the 36 councils making up its area, including the mayors as ex officio members of the council. It is responsible primarily for public transport, urban planning, water supply and treatment across the metropolitan area.

The governing body of each of the Valencian Entidad Metropolitana de Servicios Hidráulicos (EMTRE) and the Entidad Metropolitana para el Tratamiento de Residuos (EMSHI) is the assembly.

=== Others ===
There are a variety of other non-administrative bodies which are highly dependent on the particular regional legislation including:

- Junta (English: assembly or board) used for some mancomunidades (not to be confused with the governing body of some autonomous communities)
- Junta vecinal used for some minor local entities particularly in Cantabria
- Alcalde pedáneo a single person mayor used for some minor local entities.
- Concejo used for some minor local entities in Álava in the Basque Country.

== Number ==
The number of registered local entities in June 2022 is shown in the following table.

Entity	Number
Municipalities	8131
Provinces	50
Comarcas	83
Islands	7
Mancomunidades	1023
Minor local entities	3683
Metropolitan areas	3
Other groups	103

Nearly all the minor local entities are in the autonomous community of Castile and León.

== Bibliography ==
- Albet i Mas, Abel (2019). "The municipal map in Spain: structure, evolution and problems" (PDF). Geopolitica(s). Revista de estudios sobre espacio y poder (in Spanish). 10 (1): 11–40. doi:10.5209/GEOP.63834.
- Canel, María José (1994). "Local government in the Spanish autonomic state". Local Government Studies. 20 (1). London: Taylor & Francis: 44–59. doi:10.1080/03003939408433710. ISSN 1743-9388.
- Cools, Marc; Verbeek, Leen (19–21 March 2013). Local and regional democracy in Spain. Council of Europe.
- Gusman, Inês (2023). "Territories that refuse to fade away: Insights from the Províncias of Northern Portugal and the Comarcas of Galicia (Spain)". European Journal of Geography. 14 (4). European Association of Geographers: 1–12. doi:10.48088/ejg.i.gus.14.4.001.012. hdl:10451/61532.
- Moreno, Angel M. (June 2016). Merloni, Francesco (ed.). Regionalisation Trends in European Countries 2007-2015: Spain. Congress of Local and Regional Authorities of The Council of Europe. pp. 183–191.
- Moreno, Angel M. (2012). "Local Government in Spain". In Moreno, Angel M. (ed.). Local government in the Member States of the European Union: a comparative legal perspective (PDF). Spanish National Institute of Public Administration. ISBN 978-84-7351-417-0.
- "Register of Local Entities". Local Entity Portal (in Spanish). Spanish Ministry of Territorial Policy and Democratic Memory.
- Local Government Framework Act [Reguladora de las Bases del Régimen Local] (Organic Law 7/1985) (in Spanish). Agencia Estatal Boletín Oficial del Estado. 1985.
- Comarcal Organisation of Catalonia Act [Organización Comarcal de Cataluña] (Law 6/1987) (in Spanish). Agencia Estatal Boletín Oficial del Estado. 1987.
- "Local Government in Spain" (PDF). Ministry of Public Administration.
- "Local politics". Ministry of Territorial policy and Democratic Memory.

== See also ==
- Local government
- Political divisions of Spain
