= History of the territorial organization of Spain =

Aspect of Spain's history

The history of the territorial organization of Spain, in the modern sense, is a process that began in the 16th century with the dynastic union of the Crown of Aragon and the Crown of Castile, the conquest of the Kingdom of Granada and later the Kingdom of Navarre. However, it is important to clarify the origin of the toponym Spain, as well as the territorial divisions that existed previously in the current Spanish territory.

== Definition of Spain ==
The name Spain derives from Hispania, the name by which the Romans geographically designated the Iberian Peninsula as a whole, an alternative term to the name Iberia, preferred by Greek authors to refer to the same space. This name was kept after the fall of the Roman Empire as a designation of the peninsula under the Goths and among the Greco-Latin Christian world. After the Arab conquest, the part of the peninsula controlled by the Moors was called, for centuries, Al Ándalus or alternatively Spania, although the process of Reconquest ended up eliminating these names.

The unification of the various kingdoms of that geographical region led to a correspondence between that region and a single state during the brief period of union of Spain and Portugal, which ended in 1640. Since then, Spain has been explicitly used to refer to the current country of that name, while Iberia is preferred to encompass Spain and Portugal.

This article will discuss the territorial organization of Spain throughout history, although the organization of other peninsular or bordering areas will be included when imposing the current borders is anachronistic.

== Pre-Roman period ==
The Iberian Peninsula was originally occupied by peoples of different origins (Indo-European, Iberian or of unknown ethnogeny such as Cantabri, Varduli and Vascones). These peoples did not carry out any administrative division, organizing themselves as cities or tribes independent of each other.

Later, some historians have tried to create families of tribes that share the same cultural characteristics, particularly distinguishing between Iberians in the Levant and south of the peninsula, Celts in the plateau and Vascones and Cantabri in the north. The limits between one area and another are a matter of discussion, with no agreement as to whether or not to include peoples such as the Lusitanians among the Celts or as peoples per se. These classifications do not imply that there was a common administrative organization among these tribes.

Pre-Roman peoples and their linguistic affiliation prior to the conquest
C1: Gallaeci / C2b: Bracari; C3: Cantabri / C4: Astures / C5: Vaccei / C6: Turmodigi / C7: Autrigones-Caristii / C8: Varduli / C9: Berones; C10: Pellendones / C11: Belli / C12: Lusones / C13: Titii / C14: Olcades / C15: Arevaci; C16: Carpetani / C17: Vettones / C18-C19: Celtici / C20: Cynetes / L1: Lusitanians
A1: Aquitani / A2: Vascones; I1: Ceretani / I2: Ilergetes / I3: Lacetani / I4: Indigetes / I5: Laietani / I6: Ilercavones / I7: Sedetani / I8: Edetani / I9: Contestani / I10: Oretani / I11: Bastetani / I12: Turdetani
G1: Greeks / P1: Phoenicians / Carthaginians / B1: Berbers

== Roman division ==
Provincial division between 27 B.C. and 298. Hispania is divided into three provinces: Tarraconensis, Baetica and Lusitania.

The Romans carried out various divisions of the peninsula throughout the history of their Empire:

- Division of 197 B.C. (its limits were not precise, since only the coastline was dominated):
  - Hispania Citerior: Ebro Valley and Mediterranean coast.
  - Hispania Ulterior: Guadalquivir Valley.
- Division in the High Roman Empire in three provinces divided in juridical convents:
  - Hispania Ulterior Baetica
  - Hispania Ulterior Lusitania
  - Hispania Citerior Tarraconensis
- Diocese Hispaniarum (3rd century) divided into six (later seven) provinces (one of them in North Africa):
  - Tarraconensis
  - Carthaginensis
  - Baetica
  - Lusitania
  - Gallaecia
  - Balearica: this division appeared in the middle of the 4th century, under the reign of Constantius I and Constantine II.
  - Mauretania Tingitana.
First division of Hispania into two provinces: Citerior and Ulterior.

Division made during the Roman domination in conventus, ancestor of the current judicial districts.

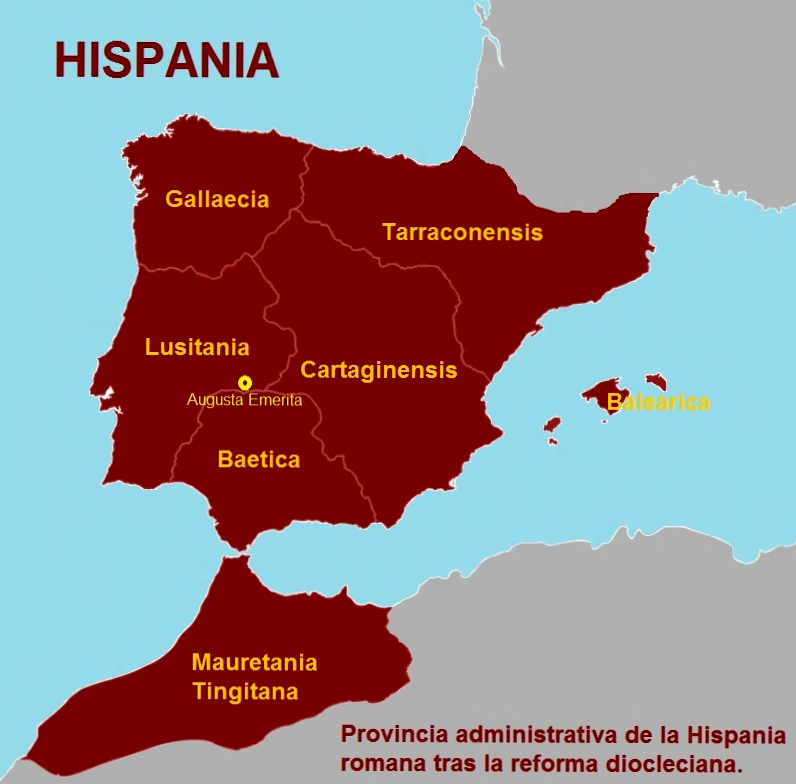
Provincial division by Diocletian in 298.

== Early Middle Ages ==
=== Barbarian kingdoms ===
Visigoth territorial division.

With the fall of the Roman Empire, the Suebi, Visigoths and other peoples occupied most of the peninsula. Finally, the Visigoths gained control of the entire peninsula in the 6th century after conquering the Suebi kingdom.

They maintained the Roman provincial administrative division (under the name of "duchies") and even created new duchies, such as Asturias and Cantabria, and the province of Celtiberia and Carpetani.

== Middle Ages, "Al-Andalus" and early modern period ==
After the Muslim conquest initiated in 711, most of the peninsula became incorporated into the Umayyad Caliphate (with Damascus as its capital; later on Baghdad) as the province of al-Andalus. The territory was administered through provinces known as coras or kūras, generally organized around an important urban center such as Córdoba, Toledo, Zaragoza, Mérida, or Seville. In frontier regions, larger military districts known as thughūr (marches) were established, especially along the borders with the Christian territories to the north.

Following the Abbasid revolution and the fall of the Umayyads in the East, Abd al-Rahman I established the independent Emirate of Córdoba in 756, politically autonomous from Baghdad. During this period, the territorial organization of "al-Andalus" became more centralized around Córdoba, while maintaining the division into kūras and frontier marches. The administration combined provincial governors, military authorities and fiscal districts inherited in part from earlier Roman and Visigothic structures.

Simultaneously in the north of the peninsula, other political entities were consolidating (a period ofter referred to historiographically as "Reconquest," reconquista). Several kingdoms were created, including the Kingdom of Asturias (718), which claimed Visigothic legitimacy and became known as the Kingdom of León after 925. In 1065, the Kingdom of Castile became independent from León, followed in 1139 by the Kingdom of Portugal. The Kingdom of Galicia was also created in 910, intermittently independent of the Kingdom of León but subordinate to it (910–914, 926–929, 981–984, 1065–1073).

In 929, Abd al-Rahman III proclaimed the Caliphate of Córdoba. Under the caliphate, al-Andalus reached its greatest political centralization and administrative development. The territory remained divided into coras, although the frontier regions acquired greater military importance through the Upper, Middle and Lower Marches (al-Tagr al-A'la, al-Tagr al-Awsat and al-Tagr al-Adna). Córdoba functioned as the political and administrative capital of the peninsula's largest state.

After the collapse of the caliphate during the civil wars of the early 11th century (the fitna of al-Andalus), political authority fragmented into numerous independent Taifa kingdoms. These taifa states were centered on cities such as Seville, Zaragoza, Toledo, Badajoz, Valencia, and Granada, and developed their own territorial administrations and dynastic structures.

From the late 11th century onwards, several Berber North African dynasties intervened in the peninsula and reunified much of Muslim territory under larger political entities. First the Almoravids and later the Almohads incorporated "al-Andalus" into empires extending across both sides of the strait of Gibraltar, reorganizing the territory under governors dependent on Marrakesh or Seville.

Following the Christian "reconquest" advances of the 12th and 13th centuries, Muslim territory in the peninsula was progressively reduced to the Nasrid Emirate of Granada, founded in 1238. The emirate was organized into administrative districts dependent on Granada and survived until 1492, when the city was conquered by the Crown of Castile. With the Catholic Monarchs, who united the crowns of Aragon and Castille into a single dynastic union, and incorporated all formerly-Nasrid territories after the "Granada war," each of the Catholic kingdoms maintained its own administrative divisions: in Castile, the provinces, and in the Crown of Aragon: districts in Aragon, vegueries in Catalonia and Mallorca, and in Valencia there were four governorates and eleven districts.

== Modern period ==
=== 16th century onwards ===
==== Crown of Castile ====
Provinces of the Crown of Castile in 1590. (Note: These circumscriptions created at the end of the 16th century in the Crown of Castile, which are sometimes called provinces, lacked any legal or administrative value and were merely fiscal in nature, so it is important to avoid confusing this concept of province with the current Provinces of Spain created in 1833.)

The territory of the kingdom of Castile was distributed among the 18 cities with the right to vote in Cortes and in turn subdivided into partidos, which in the census of 1591-1594 are sometimes called provinces

These districts created at the end of the 16th century, which were sometimes called provinces, lacked any legal or administrative value and were merely fiscal in nature, and so were completely unrelated to modern Spanish provinces. The only real administrative division existing at that time was the town and the municipality. There were also other structures, such as corregimientos, dioceses or lordships:

- Burgos, with Trasmiera, capital: Laredo and Tierras del Condestable, capital: Villalpando.
- Soria.
- Valladolid, with Tierras del Conde de Benavente, capital: Benavente.
- León, with Principality of Asturias of Oviedo, capital: Oviedo and Ponferrada.
- Zamora, with the Bishopric of Lugo, La Coruña and Betanzos, Orense, Mondoñedo, Santiago de Compostela and Tuy.
- Toro, with the District of Carrión and the District of Reinosa.
- Salamanca, with Trujillo and the province of León of the Order of Santiago, capital: Llerena.
- Avila.
- Segovia.
- Guadalajara.
- Madrid.
- Kingdom of Toledo, with Campo de Calatrava, capital: Almagro; Archbishop's Table of Toledo, capital: Talavera, Castile of the Order of Santiago, capital: Ocaña; Alfoz de Alcaraz, capital: Alcaraz; Castile of Campo de Montiel, capital: Infantes and Ciudad Real.
- Cuenca, with Huete.
- Kingdom of Murcia;
- Kingdom of Seville;
- Kingdom of Cordoba;
- Kingdom of Jaén, with Calatrava del Andalucía, capital: Martos;
- Kingdom of Granada.

Territorial division of the Iberian Peninsula during the Ancient Regime.

==== Crown of Aragon ====
- Kingdom of Aragon;
- Kingdom of Valencia, with two governorates with capitals in Valencia and Orihuela, and two sub-governments with capitals in Castellón and Xàtiva.
- Kingdom of Majorca.
- Principality of Catalonia, with twelve vegueries with capitals in Tortosa, Tarragona, Montblanc, Barcelona, Vic, Manresa, Vilafranca del Penedès, Girona, Camprodon, Lleida, Tàrrega and Cervera.

=== Intendencies of 1720 ===
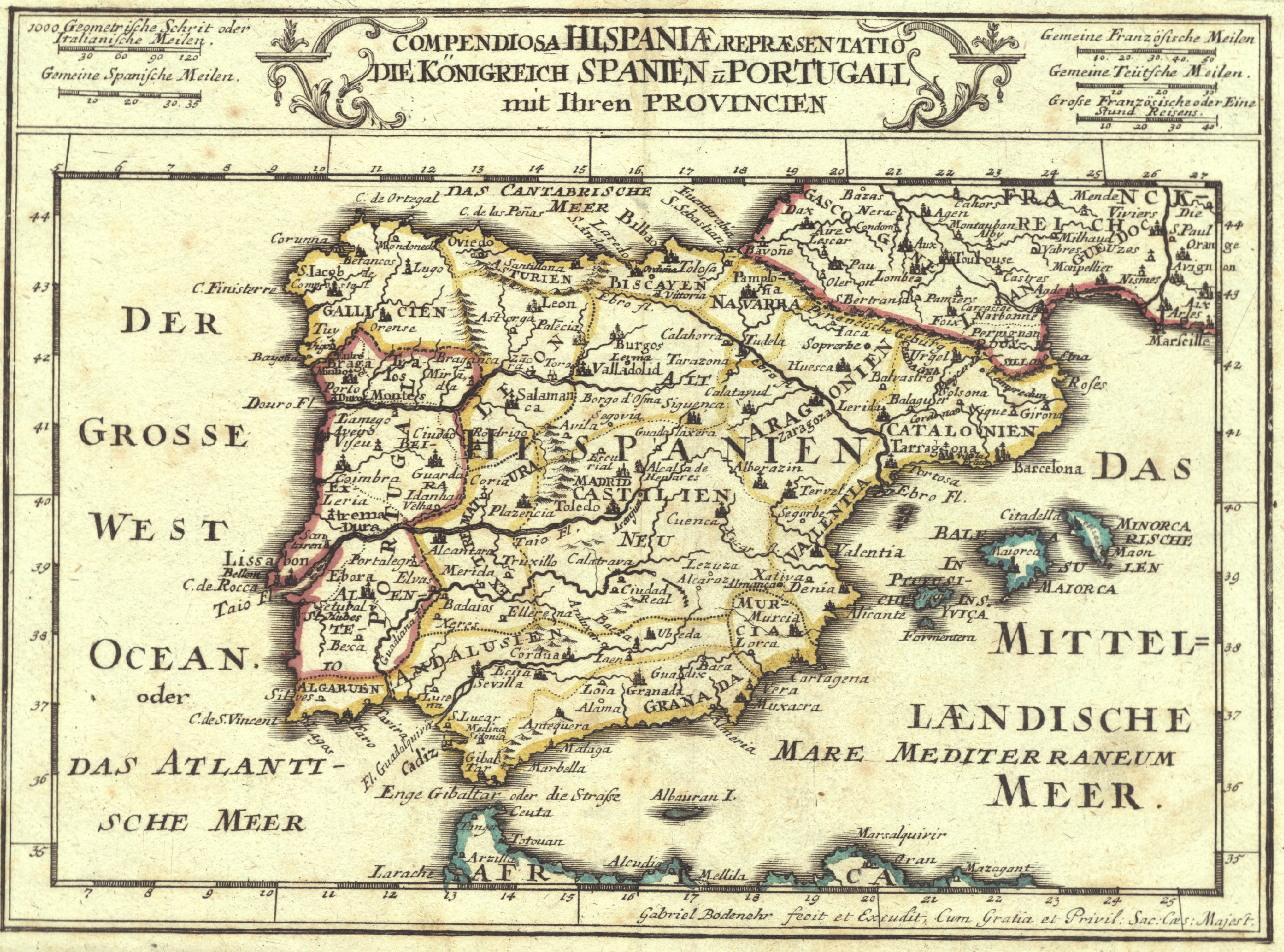
Map of 1720 showing the interior kingdoms of peninsular Spain during the Ancient Regime.

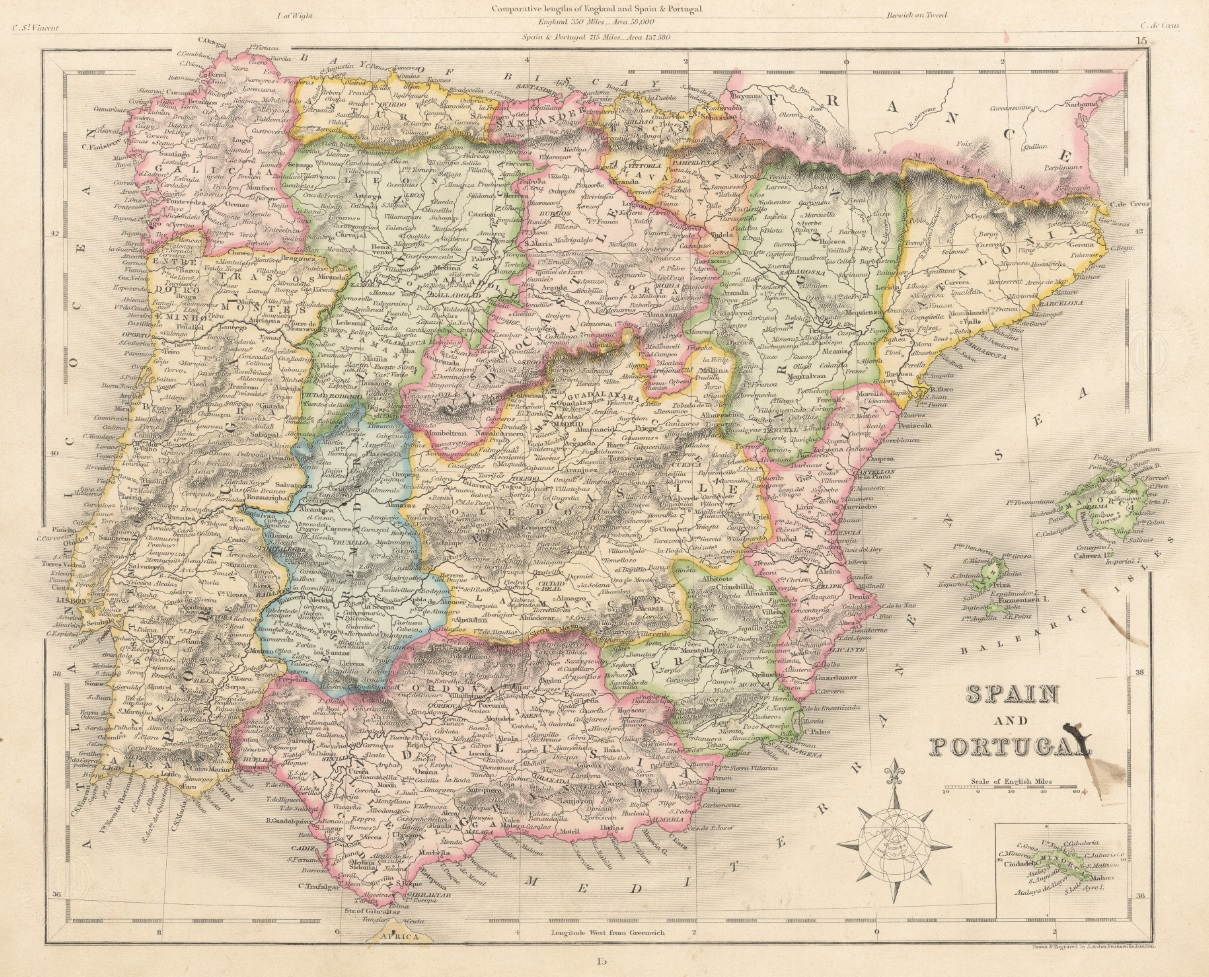
Map of 1841, made by J. Archer, showing for Spain the territorial division of Floridablanca of 1785.

Philip V created, taking as a base the pre-existing provinces created by the Austrias, the institution of the intendancies. These did not always coincide with the limits of the provinces, so there was some opposition to this division.

He created 20 intendancies: La Coruña, León, Valladolid, Burgos, Pamplona, Zaragoza, Barcelona, Salamanca, Ávila, Guadalajara, Toledo, Madrid, Ciudad Real, Valencia, Mérida, Seville, Córdoba, Granada, Palma and Santa Cruz de Tenerife.

Ferdinand VI rearranged the limits of the intendancies, making them coincide with the provinces of the Austrias and the former kingdoms of Spain.

Tomás González Hernández, headmaster of the Cathedral Church of Plasencia, reorganizes the Royal Archive of Simancas, after the despoilment suffered after the Napoleonic invasion. His work Census of the population of the Provinces and Districts of the Crown of Castile in the 16th century has constituted the only published source to know the Spanish population in the time of the Austrias. The archivist completes the so-called Book of the Millions with data from other regions: Catalonia, Basque Country, Navarre, Valencia and Aragon.

Under the reign of Carlos III, on March 22, 1785, the Count of Floridablanca promoted the creation of a Prontuario or nomenclator of the towns of Spain and maps were drawn up to facilitate the control of the kingdom:

At the end of the Ancient Regime the local jurisdictions offered a picture even more obsolete and anachronistic than that of the old provinces; distributed in royal, abadengas and secular lordship jurisdictions, they were the result of historical circumstances accumulated over the centuries and represented the antithesis of rationality and administrative efficiency.

== 19th century ==
During the 19th century, Spain witnessed a struggle between the Ancient Regime and the liberal State, with two antagonistic concepts of government. The liberal State needed a new territorial organization that would allow it to govern the country in a uniform manner, collect taxes and create a single market with equal laws for all.

=== Soler Plan of 1799 ===
At the beginning of the 19th century, a new division of the territory of Spain was carried out on the basis of Enlightenment criticism of the previous division. This division was part of a project to reorganize the territory promoted by Miguel Cayetano Soler, general superintendent of finance, mainly with the intention of simplifying the tax system and rationalizing the collection of taxes, so that the new reform gave a greater role to the delegates of the intendant —the subdelegates of revenue— and to the district boards.

One of the most important points of the reform was the creation, by Royal Decree of 25 September 1799 and Instruction of 4 October of the same year, of six maritime provinces, Oviedo, Santander, Alicante, Cartagena, Malaga and Cadiz, which were separated, respectively, from the Intendencies of León, Burgos, Valencia, Murcia, Granada and Seville, all of which were very large provinces. All the provinces created in 1799 have continued to exist in subsequent divisions up to the present day, with the exception of the period under the division into prefectures of 1810, and the province of Cartagena, which disappeared with the last and definitive provincial division of 1833, which is still in force today except for slight modifications.

=== Prefectures of 1810 ===
The outbreak of the War of Independence in May 1808 established a new order under Napoleon, who put his brother Joseph Bonaparte on the throne. In 1810, the Josephine government tried to order the territory by dividing it into 38 prefectures, in the style of those established in France, and 111 sub-prefectures, according to the project of the engineer and mathematician José María Lanz. The prefectures were to be named after geographical features, mainly rivers and capes. This division made a clean sweep of historical conditions, but it never came into force.

Map of the 1810 division into prefectures made by Joseph I following the example of the French départements. However, this new division was never fully implemented, as this government only controlled part of Spain and Napoleon was planning to incorporate the lands north of the Ebro into France.

Thirty-eight peninsular prefectures were created, plus the Balearic and Canary Islands:

- Águeda, with its capital at Ciudad Rodrigo (roughly equivalent to the south of what is now the province of Salamanca and the north of Cáceres).
  - Subprefectures in Ciudad Rodrigo, Béjar and Navarredonda.
- Arlanzón, with capital at Burgos (equivalent to the centre of the province of Burgos and La Rioja).
  - Subprefectures in Burgos, Calahorra and Logroño.
- Baleares, with capital in Mallorca, no sub-prefectures.
- Bidasoa, with its capital in Pamplona (equivalent to Navarre).
  - Sub-prefectures in Pamplona, San Sebastián and Olite.
- Cabo de la Nao, with capital in Alicante (equivalent to Alicante, south of Valencia and east of Albacete).
  - Sub-prefectures in Alicante, Dénia and Xàtiva.
- Cabo de Peñas, with capital in Oviedo (equivalent to Asturias, except the lands between the rivers Eo and Navia)
  - Subprefectures in Oviedo, Gijón and Navia.
- Cabo Machichaco, with capital in Vitoria (equivalent to the Basque Country).
  - Sub-prefectures in Vitoria, Bilbao and Azkoitia.
- Cabo Mayor, with capital in Santander (equivalent to Cantabria).
  - Subprefectures in Santander, Laredo and Villarcayo.
- Canarias, with capital in Santa Cruz de Tenerife, no sub-prefectures
- Carrión, with capital in Palencia (equivalent to Palencia)
  - Sub-prefectures in Palencia, Carrión de los Condes and Cervera de Pisuerga.
- Cinca y Segre, with capital in Lleida (equivalent to the north-west of the province of Lleida)
  - Sub-prefectures in Lleida, Seu d'Urgell and Talarn.
- Duero Alto, with capital in Soria (equivalent to Soria)
  - Sub-prefectures in Soria, El Burgo de Osma and Medinaceli.
- Duero y Pisuerga, with capital in Valladolid (equivalent to Valladolid, south of Burgos, Segovia and east of Ávila).
  - Sub-prefectures in Valladolid, Aranda de Duero and Segovia
- Ebro, with capital in Tarragona (equivalent to the province of Tarragona, south-east of Lleida, east of Zaragoza, north-east of Teruel and north of Castellón)
  - Sub-prefectures in Tarragona, Tortosa and Alcañiz.
- Ebro y Cinca, with capital in Huesca (equivalent to the province of Huesca)
  - Subprefectures in Huesca, Barbastro and Jaca.
- Ebro y Jalón, with capital in Zaragoza (province of Zaragoza and north of the province of Teruel).
  - Subprefectures in Zaragoza, Calatayud and Híjar.
- Esla, with capital in Astorga.
  - Subprefectures in Astorga, León and Benavente
- Genil, with its capital in Granada (provinces of Almería and Granada)
  - Sub-prefectures in Granada, Almería and Baza.
- Guadalaviar Alto, with capital in Teruel (south of the province of Teruel)
  - Sub-prefectures in Teruel and Aliaga.
- Guadalaviar Bajo, with capital in Valencia (province of Valencia and south of the province of Castellón).
  - Sub-prefectures in Valencia, Castellón de la Plana and Segorbe.
- Guadalete, with capital in Jerez de la Frontera (province of Cadiz)
  - Sub-prefectures in Jerez de la Frontera, Cádiz and Ronda.
- Guadalquivir Alto, with capital in Jaén (province of Jaén)
  - Sub-prefectures in Jaén, Úbeda and La Carolina.
- Guadalquivir Bajo, with capital in Seville (provinces of Huelva and Seville)
  - Sub-prefectures in Seville, Ayamonte and Aracena.
- Guadalquivir y Guadajoz, with capital in Cordoba (province of Cordoba)
  - Sub-prefectures in Cordoba, Ecija and Lucena.
- Guadiana y Guadajira, with capital in Mérida (province of Badajoz and west of the province of Ciudad Real).
  - Sub-prefectures in Mérida, Badajoz and Llerena.
- Jucar Alto, with capital in Cuenca (province of Cuenca)
  - Subprefectures in Cuenca and Tarazona de la Mancha.
- Llobregat, with capital in Barcelona (Province of Barcelona)
  - Subprefectures in Barcelona, Manresa and Solsona.
- Manzanares, with capital in Madrid (city of Madrid and surrounding areas)
  - Subprefectures in Madrid and Alcalá de Henares.
- Miño Bajo, with capital in Vigo (province of Pontevedra)
  - Sub-prefectures in Vigo, Pontevedra and Tuy.
- Miño Alto, with capital in Lugo (north of the province of Lugo and Asturian lands west of the Navia).
  - Subprefectures in Lugo, Mondoñedo and Viveiro.
- Ojos del Guadiana, with its capital in Ciudad Real (Ciudad Real province, south of Toledo province and west of Albacete province).
  - Subprefectures in Ciudad Real and Alcaraz.
- Salado, with its capital in Málaga (province of Málaga and south-east of the province of Seville).
  - Subprefectures in Málaga, Osuna and Antequera.
- Segura, with capital in Murcia (province of Murcia, north-east of Granada province, central part of Albacete province and the Vega Baja del Segura of Alicante province).
  - Sub-prefectures in Murcia, Cartagena, Albacete and Huéscar.
- Sil, with capital in Ourense (Province of Ourense and southern part of the Province of Lugo).
  - Subprefectures in Orense, Monforte de Lemos and Monterrei.
- Tajo Alto, with capital in Guadalajara (Province of Guadalajara and north-west of the Province of Cuenca).
  - Sub-prefectures in Guadalajara, Sigüenza and Huete.
- Tajo y Alagón, with capital in Cáceres (province of Cáceres without its northern third).
  - Sub-prefectures in Cáceres, Plasencia and Talavera de la Reina.
- Tajo y Alberche, with capital in Toledo (north of the province of Toledo, from the Tagus, and province of Madrid, without the prefecture of Manzanares).
  - Sub-prefectures in Toledo, Ocaña and Casarrubios del Monte.
- Tambre, with capital in A Coruña (province of A Coruña).
  - Subprefectures in A Coruña, Santiago de Compostela and Corcubión.
- Ter, with capital in Girona (province of Girona).
  - Subprefectures in Girona, Vic and Camprodón.
- Tormes, with capital in Salamanca (province of Zamora and north of the province of Salamanca).
  - Subprefectures in Salamanca, Toro and Zamora.

Although the War of Independence prevented the adoption of all these reforms, in 1812 a decree allowed Catalonia to be annexed to France until 1814 as a new region divided into four departments:

- Department of the Bouches-de-l'Èbre with a prefecture in Lleida and subprefectures in Cervera, Tortosa and Tarragona.
- Department of Montserrat with a prefecture in Barcelona and subprefectures in Manresa and Vilafranca del Penedès.
- Department of Sègre with a prefecture in Puigcerdà and subprefectures in Solsona and Talarn.
- Department of Ter with a prefecture in Girona and subprefectures in Vic and Figueres.

=== Cortes of Cadiz ===
In 1811, the Cortes of Cadiz abolished the jurisdictional lordships, thus eliminating the division between seigneurialism and royalty, which, despite the restoration of absolutism by Ferdinand VII in 1814, would not come into force again.

At the same time, the Cortes of Cadiz tried to create a new regime, also liberal, in which all the provinces would have the same obligations. The constitution of 1812 did not recognize the political personality of the former historical territories. This was approved by the deputies of all the provinces, including the American territories. The Cortes came up with a new system that did take into account the historical conditions. Thirty-two provinces were created, according to Floridablanca's nomenclature, with some corrections. But in 1813 they also commissioned a new provincial division from Felipe Bauzá, which determined 36 provinces, with seven subordinate provinces, based on historical criteria. But none of this was approved, and the return of Ferdinand VII meant a return to the Ancient Regime, with certain modifications. In 1817 Spain was divided into 29 intendencies and 13 consulates.

=== Territorial division of 1822 ===
Territorial division of the Vascongadas, Navarre and part of Old Castile.

After General Riego's uprising during the Liberal Triennium (1820–1823), the construction of the Liberal State was promoted, and with it a new provincial division, although the provincial councils of 1813 were recovered first. The idea was that this division would cover the whole country, without exception, and would be the single framework for administrative, governmental, judicial and economic activities, according to criteria of legal equality, unity and efficiency. The project was entrusted to the technicians Felipe Bauzá and José Agustín de Larramendi.

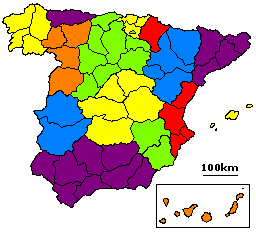
Map of the 1822 division of Spain into provinces and regions.

In January 1822, the Cortes provisionally approved a provincial division of Spain into 52 provinces:

- Province of Alicante, with Alicante as its capital.
- Province of Almería, with its capital in Almería.
- Province of Ávila, with its capital in Ávila.
- Province of Badajoz, with its capital in Badajoz.
- Province of Balears (islands), with its capital in Palma.
- Province of Barcelona, with capital in Barcelona.
- Province of Bilbao, with capital in Bilbao.
- Province of Burgos, with capital in Burgos.
- Province of Cáceres, with capital in Cáceres.
- Province of Cádiz, with capital in Cádiz.
- Province of Calatayud, with capital in Calatayud.
- Province of Canary Islands, with capital in Santa Cruz de Tenerife.
- Province of Castellón, with its capital in Castellón de la Plana.
- Province of Ciudad Real, with its capital city in Ciudad Real.
- Province of Chinchilla, with capital in Chinchilla.
- Province of Córdoba, with capital in Córdoba.
- Province of A Coruña, with capital in A Coruña.
- Province of Cuenca, with capital in Cuenca.
- Province of Girona, with capital Girona.
- Province of Granada, with capital in Granada.
- Province of Guadalajara, with capital city in Guadalajara.
- Province of Huelva, with capital in Huelva.
- Province of Huesca, with capital in Huesca.
- Province of Jaén, with capital in Jaén.
- Province of Játiva, with capital in Xàtiva.
- Province of León, with capital in León.
- Province of Lleida, with capital city in Lleida.
- Province of Logroño, with capital in Logroño.
- Province of Lugo, with capital city in Lugo.
- Province of Madrid, with capital in Madrid.
- Province of Málaga, with capital in Málaga.
- Province of Murcia, with capital in Murcia.
- Province of Ourense, with capital in Ourense.
- Province of Oviedo, with capital in Oviedo.
- Province of Palencia, with capital in Palencia.
- Province of Pamplona, with capital in Pamplona.
- Province of Salamanca, with capital in Salamanca.
- Province of San Sebastián, with capital city in San Sebastián.
- Province of Santander, with capital in Santander.
- Province of Segovia, with capital city in Segovia.
- Province of Sevilla, with capital in Sevilla.
- Province of Soria, with capital city in Soria.
- Province of Tarragona, with capital city in Tarragona.
- Province of Teruel, with the capital Teruel.
- Province of Toledo, with capital in Toledo.
- Province of Valencia, with capital in Valencia.
- Province of Valladolid, with capital in Valladolid.
- Province of Vigo, with capital in Vigo.
- Province of Vierzo, with capital in Villafranca del Bierzo.
- Province of Vitoria, with capital in Vitoria.
- Province of Zamora, with capital in Zamora.
- Province of Zaragoza, with capital in Zaragoza

Some of these provinces appear for the first time, such as Almería and Málaga (separated from the traditional Kingdom of Granada), Huelva (from the Kingdom of Seville), Calatayud and others appear with new names, such as the Vascongadas Provinces.

This project makes few concessions to history, and is governed by criteria of population, extension and geographical coherence. There is a desire to go beyond historical names, preferring those of the capital cities. Nor are the traditional boundaries of the provinces respected, creating a new map. The enclaves of some provinces in others were eliminated if they belonged to different kingdoms, but many enclaves were preserved when they were within the same kingdom.

In 1822 the provincial intendants were re-established as delegates of the Treasury. But the fall of the liberal government and the restoration of absolutism put an end to the project. In 1823, the provinces of the Ancient Regime were re-established, so the 1822 plan never came into force.

=== Territorial reform of 1833 ===
Map of the territorial division of 1833.

This reform carried out by Javier de Burgos in 1833 basically adopted the 1822 project, and has been maintained with some changes —partition of the Canary Islands, inclusion of Castilian comarcas to Valencian provinces— up to the present day. It divided the Spanish territory into 49 provinces on the basis of a rational criterion, with a relatively homogeneous size and eliminating most of the exclaves and enclaves typical of the Ancient Regime. At the same time, it grouped the provinces into regions with a merely classificatory character, without reserving for these any type of competence or administrative or jurisdictional body common to the provinces they grouped together. The territorial organization was as follows:

- Andalusia: Almeria, Cadiz, Cordoba, Granada, Huelva, Jaen, Malaga and Seville.
- Aragon: Huesca, Teruel and Zaragoza.
- Asturias: Oviedo.
- Balearic Islands: Balearic Islands.
- Canary Islands: Santa Cruz de Tenerife.
- Castilla la Nueva: Ciudad Real, Cuenca, Guadalajara, Madrid and Toledo.
- Castilla la Vieja: Avila, Burgos, Logroño, Palencia, Santander, Segovia, Soria and Valladolid.
- Catalonia: Barcelona, Girona, Lleida and Tarragona.
- Extremadura: Badajoz and Cáceres.
- Galicia: A Coruña, Lugo, Ourense and Pontevedra.
- Leon: Leon, Salamanca and Zamora.
- Murcia: Albacete and Murcia.
- Navarra: Navarra.
- Valencia: Alicante, Castellón de la Plana, and Valencia.
- Vascongadas: Álava, Gipuzkoa and Biscay.

This provincial division was only implemented for the peninsular zone and adjacent islands, excluding the territories of Cuba, Puerto Rico, the Philippines, the Mariana Islands, the Caroline Islands, Palau, Equatorial Guinea and the North African sovereignties (Western Sahara, Ifni and Northern Morocco had not yet been incorporated).

The main difference was that the Canary Islands had not been divided into two provinces to date, with Santa Cruz de Tenerife as their capital. In 1927, with the appearance of the province of Las Palmas, the number of provinces was increased to 50. Another difference is that most of the statutes of autonomy are based on this division, except those that have to do with the region of León, the region of Castilla la Vieja, the region of Castilla la Nueva and the region of Murcia.

== Attempts at regionalization in the 19th century ==
=== 1847 ===
General Governments proposed in the 1847 Decree of Escosura.

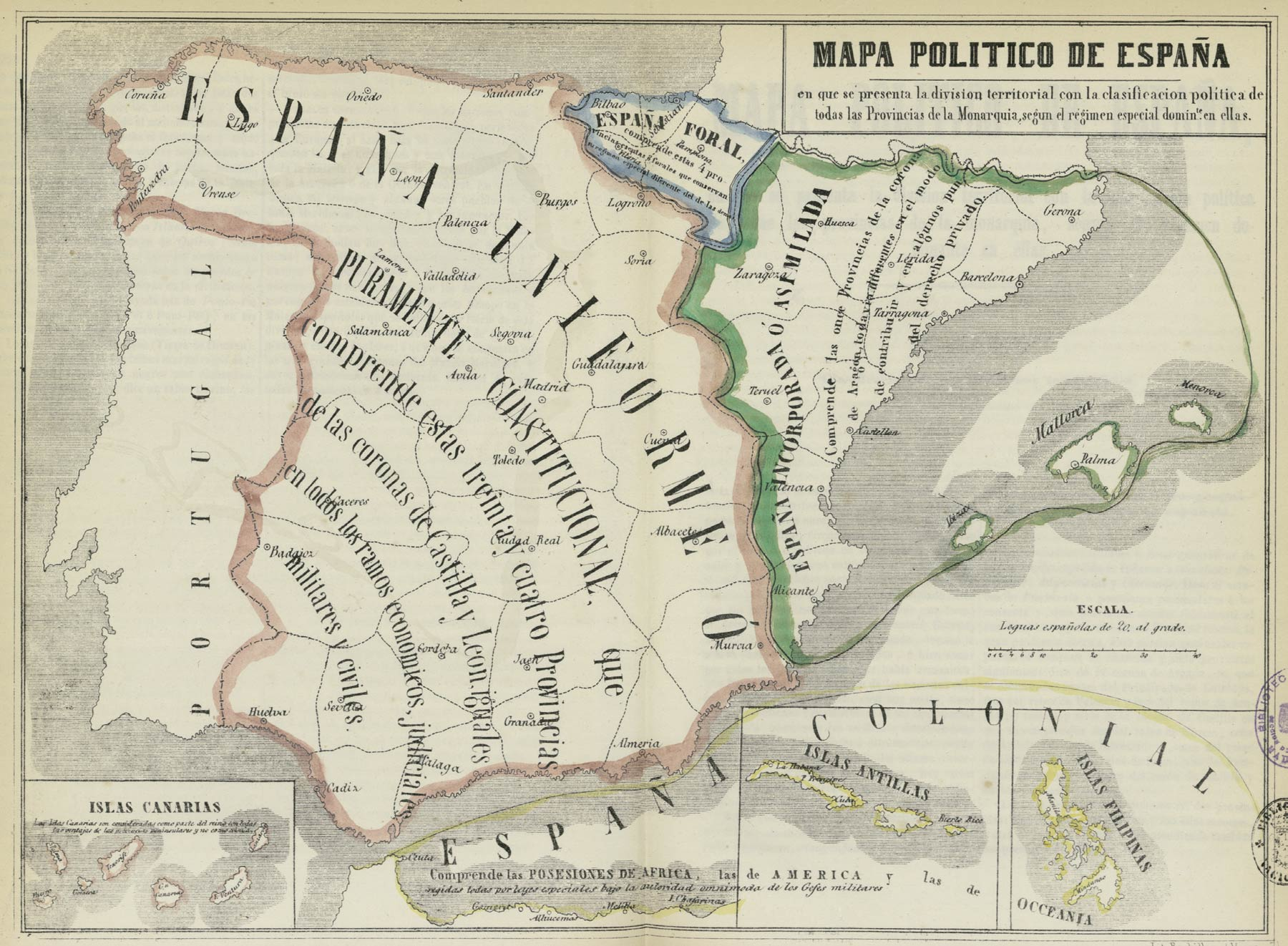
Map of Spain showing the territorial division with the classification of all the provinces of the Monarchy according to the special legal regime common to them (Jorge Torres Villegas, 1852).

In an attempt to regionalize the peninsula, Patricio de la Escosura promulgated a decree on September 29, 1847 —which was suspended the same year— the peninsula was divided into eleven general governments:

- Andalusia, capital Seville. Provinces of Seville, Cordoba, Cadiz and Huelva.
- Aragón, capital Zaragoza. Provinces of Zaragoza, Huesca and Teruel.
- Burgos, capital Burgos. Provinces of Burgos, Santander, Logroño and Soria.
- Cantabria, capital Pamplona. Provinces of Navarra, Álava, Guipúzcoa and Vizcaya.
- Castilla la Nueva, capital Madrid and formed by the provinces of Madrid, Cuenca, Segovia, Guadalajara, Toledo and Ciudad Real.
- Castilla la Vieja, capital Valladolid. Provinces of Valladolid, León, Palencia, Salamanca, Zamora, Ávila and Oviedo.
- Catalonia, capital Barcelona. Provinces of Barcelona, Lérida, Gerona and Tarragona.
- Extremadura, capital Badajoz. Provinces of Badajoz and Cáceres.
- Galicia, capital La Coruña. Provinces of La Coruña, Pontevedra, Lugo and Orense.
- Granada, capital Granada. Provinces of Granada, Málaga, Almería and Jaén.
- Valencia and Murcia, capital Valencia. Provinces of Valencia, Murcia, Alicante, Albacete and Castellón.

=== 1873 ===
States proposed in the draft Federal Constitution of 1873. Cuba and Puerto Rico are not represented. Indicative provincial distribution, since their configuration was the responsibility of the member states.

In 1873, during the First Spanish Republic, a draft Constitution was drawn up defining Spain as a Federal Republic, made up of seventeen States with legislative, executive and judicial power. According to articles 92 and 93, these "States" would have "complete economic-administrative autonomy and all the political autonomy compatible with the existence of the Nation", as well as "the power to give themselves a political Constitution". This constitution, whose text is mainly attributed to Castelar, was never adopted. As it was a federal Constitution, nothing was said about the provinces, as sub-divisions were to be defined by the member States. The first article of the draft reads as follows:

The States of Andalusia Alta, Andalusia Baja, Aragon, Asturias, Balearic Islands, Canary Islands, Castilla la Nueva, Castilla la Vieja, Catalonia, Cuba, Extremadura, Galicia, Murcia, Navarre, Puerto Rico, Valencia, Regiones Vascongadas compose the Spanish Nation.

=== 1884 ===
Regions proposed in the reform promoted by Segismundo Moret in 1884.

Later, in 1884, Segismundo Moret presented a new bill on January 6, 1884, which distributed the peninsula and adjacent islands into fifteen administrative and political regions, approximating the distribution of the Territorial Audiences, which also failed. Its distribution was as follows:

- Aragon: Huesca, Logroño, Zaragoza.
- Asturias: León and Oviedo.
- Balearic Islands.
- Canary Islands.
- Castilla la Vieja: Burgos, Palencia, Santander and Soria.
- Catalonia: Barcelona, Gerona, Lérida and Tarragona.
- Extremadura: Cáceres, Badajoz and Ciudad Real.
- Galicia: La Coruña, Lugo, Orense and Pontevedra.
- Granada: Almería, Granada, Jaén and Málaga.
- Madrid: Guadalajara, Madrid and Toledo.
- Murcia: Albacete, Alicante and Murcia.
- Seville: Cadiz, Cordoba, Huelva and Seville.
- Valencia: Castellón, Cuenca, Teruel, Valencia.
- Valladolid: Avila, Salamanca, Segovia, Valladolid and Zamora.
- Vascongadas: Álava, Guipúzcoa, Navarra and Biscay.

=== 1891 ===
Regions proposed in the reform promoted by Francisco Silvela in 1891.

Seven years later there was another attempt at regionalization which was not consummated either, in this case promoted by Francisco Silvela. By means of a Royal Order of July 20, 1891 and a Bill on the same date, he announced his intention to organize the government of the peninsula, the Canary Islands and the Balearic Islands into thirteen regions. This project foresaw that the regions would reach an important consideration as an autonomous entity and assigned them the following distribution:

- Aragon: capital Zaragoza, also including Huesca, Logroño, Soria and Teruel.
- Asturias: capital Oviedo, also including the provinces of Santander and Gijón. The latter appears as a split of the former province of Oviedo.
- Balearic Islands.
- Canary Islands.
- Castilla la Nueva: capital Madrid, also including Cuenca, Guadalajara, Ávila, Toledo and Segovia.
- Castilla la Vieja: capital Valladolid, also including Burgos, León, Palencia, Salamanca and Zamora. Salamanca is divided in two and is shared with Extremadura.
- Catalonia: capital Barcelona, also including Gerona, Lérida and Tarragona.
- Cuba: capital Havana, also including Pinar del Río, Matanzas, Santa Clara, Puerto Príncipe and Santiago de Cuba.
- Extremadura: capital Badajoz, including also Cáceres, Ciudad Real and Salamanca (the rest of the province that is not in Old Castile).
- Galicia: capital La Coruña, also including Lugo, Orense and Pontevedra.
- Granada: capital Granada, also including Almería, Jaén and Málaga.
- Puerto Rico: capital San Juan.
- Seville: capital Seville, also including Cadiz, Cordoba and Huelva.
- Valencia: capital Valencia, also including Albacete, Alicante, Castellón and Murcia.
- Vascongadas: no capital defined. The capital would be chosen among the member provinces, which are Álava, Gipuzkoa, Navarra and Biscay.

Silvela's proposal would only materialize (and only briefly) in Cuba and Puerto Rico with the approval in 1897 of their respective autonomous charters.

The only four peninsular regions that maintained their limits in all the regionalization projects were Catalonia, Galicia, Granada (called Andalusia Alta in the 1873 Constitution) and Seville (called Andalusia in the Escosura project and Andalusia Baja in the 1873 Constitution).

=== 1897 ===
In an ephemeral way, a precedent for the regionalization of the administration began with the approval of:

- Autonomous Charter of Cuba.
- Autonomous Charter of Puerto Rico.

== Regionalization in the Second Republic ==
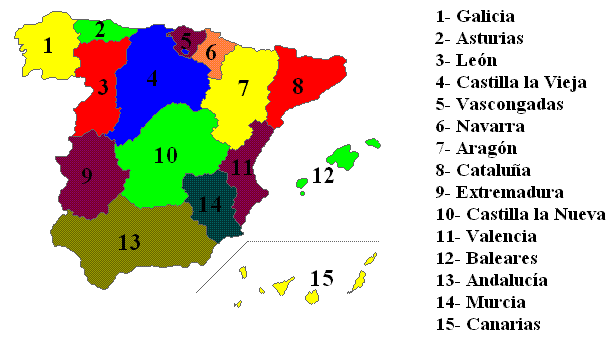
Regions with the right to appoint a member of the Court of Guarantees of the Second Republic.

With the assumption in 1931 of the Second Spanish Republic, the possibility was introduced in the Constitution for the regions that made up Spain to become autonomous regions. Thus, in 1932 Catalonia approved its Statute of Autonomy, while the Vascongadas provinces did not make this possibility effective until 1936, when the Basque Autonomous Statute came into force. In Galicia, the Draft Statute of Autonomy of Galicia of 1936 was also included, which was approved by referendum by the Galician people but which, on the outbreak of the Civil War, did not enter into force, although its text was delivered to the president of the Spanish Cortes and admitted for processing by the latter. In the rest of the historical regions there were only timid attempts to approve statutes of autonomy, which did not go beyond the draft stage. All the regions, both Autonomous (with statute) and Non-Autonomous (without statute), are recognized as such in the Organic Law of the Court of Constitutional Guarantees of 1933, which granted them the right to appoint a regional member.

Autonomous Regions

- Catalonia (1932): Barcelona, Girona, Lleida and Tarragona.
- Basque Country (1936): Álava, Gipuzkoa and Biscay.
- Galicia (1936): A Coruña, Lugo, Ourense and Pontevedra.

Non-Autonomous Regions

- Andalusia: Almeria, Cadiz, Cordoba, Granada, Huelva, Jaen, Malaga and Seville.
- Aragón: Huesca, Teruel and Zaragoza.
- Asturias: Oviedo.
- Balearic Islands: Balearic Islands.
- Canary Islands: Santa Cruz de Tenerife and Las Palmas.
- Castilla la Nueva: Ciudad Real, Cuenca, Guadalajara, Madrid and Toledo.
- Castilla la Vieja: Avila, Burgos, Logroño, Palencia, Santander, Segovia, Soria and Valladolid.
- Extremadura: Badajoz and Cáceres.
- Leon: Leon, Salamanca and Zamora.
- Murcia: Albacete and Murcia.
- Navarra: Navarra.
- Valencia: Alicante, Castellón de la Plana and Valencia.

== Franco's dictatorship ==
Spain - Provincial and Regional Division in 1960.

With the end of the civil war and the dictatorship of Francisco Franco, the regions lose their political importance, passing all territorial management to the deputations and the Civil Governments of each province. The model of regions taught in schools was inherited from the separation of the Republic.

In 1958, the territories of Western Sahara and Ifni were established as provinces, the latter until 1969 (when it was ceded to the Kingdom of Morocco) and the former until 1976 (when it was evacuated and handed over to Morocco and Mauritania).

In 1964, the provinces of Rio Muni and Fernando Poo were organized in the Autonomous Regime of Equatorial Guinea, in force until its independence in 1968.

It was not until democracy in 1975 that it made sense again to speak of the regions of Spain.

== State of the autonomous regions ==
Current territorial division of Spain.

The Spanish Constitution was approved in 1978, recognizing the right to autonomy for the regions and nationalities that make up Spain. Thus began the process of constitution of the State of Autonomies. On July 31, 1981, UCD and PSOE approved the autonomous pacts by which Spain is divided into 17 autonomous communities and 2 autonomous cities, the latter of which officially became autonomous in 1995. Each autonomous region is divided into several provinces —except the uniprovincial ones— which are the same, except for minor modifications, as those of Javier de Burgos' division.

The nineteen autonomies are: Andalusia, Aragon, Balearic Islands, Canary Islands, Cantabria, Castile-La Mancha, Castile and León, Catalonia, Ceuta, Community of Madrid, Foral Community of Navarre, Valencian Community, Extremadura, Galicia, Melilla, Basque Country, Principality of Asturias, Region of Murcia, La Rioja.

== See also ==
- Provincial deputation (Spain)
- Provinces of Spain

== Bibliography ==
- García de Cortázar, Fernando (2005). Atlas de historia de España (in Spanish). ISBN 84-08-05752-9.
