= 1822 territorial division of Spain =

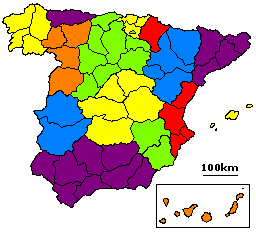
Map of the 1822 territorial division of Spain. The colored regions here properly date from 1833, not 1822. They are used here just to enable easy comparison of the maps.

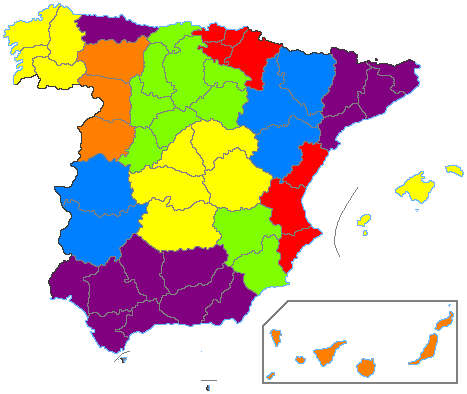
Map of the similar 1833 territorial division of Spain; this division into provinces remains in effect with only minor modifications as of 2009; the colored regions were superseded by the modern autonomies.

The 1822 territorial division of Spain was a rearrangement of the territory of Spain into various provinces, enacted briefly during the Trienio Liberal of 1820–1823. It is remembered today largely as a precursor to the similar 1833 territorial division of Spain; the provinces established in the latter remain, by and large, the basis for the present-day division of Spain into provinces.

== Background ==
After the uprising led by liberal general Rafael del Riego of 1820 led to the Trienio Liberal (three years of government by the Spanish liberals), that government proposed a new division of Spain in its entirety, for administrative, governmental, judicial and economic purposes, according to criteria of legal equality, unity and efficiency. While the liberal government was crushed in 1823 by a French intervention led by the similarly restored French Bourbons, some of the reforms and ideas of the brief intermezzo would endure and form the basis of later government policy, in this case the very similar 1833 provincial subdivision of Spain which is still largely in place (albeit superseded in importance by the Autonomous Communities of Spain in many regards).

== The provinces ==
On 27 January 1822 the government approved a provisional division of Spain into 52 provinces. The 1833 statute would follow this pattern closely, although it eliminated three of the provinces and renamed five others.

The following table groups provinces by the "historic regions" that were introduced in 1833.

1822 provinces
| Historic region | Provinces |
|---|---|
| Andalusia | Almería, Cádiz, Córdoba, Granada, Huelva, Jaén, Málaga, Sevilla |
| Aragon | Calatayud, Huesca, Teruel, Zaragoza |
| Asturias | Oviedo |
| Balearic Islands | Palma de Mallorca |
| Canary Islands | Santa Cruz de Tenerife (which also included the present-day province of Las Palmas) |
| New Castile | Ciudad Real, Cuenca, Guadalajara, Madrid, Toledo |
| Old Castile | Ávila, Burgos, Logroño, Palencia, Santander, Segovia, Soria, Valladolid |
| Catalonia | Barcelona, Gerona, Lérida, Tarragona |
| Extremadura | Badajoz, Cáceres |
| Galicia | La Coruña, Lugo, Orense, Pontevedra |
| León | León, Salamanca, El Vierzo, Zamora |
| Murcia | Chinchilla (the later Province of Albacete, with a different proposed capital), Murcia |
| Navarre | Pamplona (Navarre) |
| Valencia | Alicante, Castellón, Játiva, Valencia. |
| Basque provinces | Bilbao (Vizcaya), San Sebastián (Guipúzcoa), Vitoria (Álava) |

Some of these provinces were entities created for the first time, such as Almería and Málaga (carved out of the traditional Kingdom of Granada), Huelva (Kingdom of Seville), Calatayud, and Logroño; others were given new names, such as Murcia or the Basque provinces (Spanish: provincias Vascongadas).

This proposal made few concessions to history, sticking closely to criteria of population, geographical area, and geographic coherence. Historic regional names were generally ignored, with provinces named after their respective capitals. Nor were traditional provincial borders respected by the new map. Most enclaves of one province within another were eliminated. The precise number of provinces and their capitals was the subject of intense debate.

1822 saw the restoration of the institution of provincial intendants as delegates of the Ministry of the Treasury (Hacienda), but the fall of the liberal government and restoration of absolutism in 1823 brought an end to the project. The old provincial arrangement of Spain was restored, as was the division into kingdoms; these would remain in effect until 1833.
