= Cunquilla de Vidriales =

Town in Zamora, Spain

Coordinates: 42°03′N 5°54′W

Cunquilla de Vidriales is a town in the Spanish municipality of Granucillo, in the province of Zamora, in the autonomous community of Castilla y León.

== Place name ==
The toponym Cunquilla could derive from the Latin word concha, meaning basin, with a possible evolution of conc-/cunc-/cunq-, in the sense of territory surrounded by heights, as Madoz points out when he says that it is "the village that is located in the lowest and narrowest part of the Vidriales Valley". The diminutive would also have Latin origin, -ella (-illa), meaning small, as in other villages in the surrounding area (Vecilla de la Polvorosa, Vecilla de Trasmonte and Quintanilla de Urz). In other words, Cunquilla would refer to a small basin, as shown by its landscape.

== Location ==
It is located near the Almucera stream which, in times of flooding, has inundated nearby houses and land. It is located in the north of the province of Zamora, in the narrowest and lowest part of the Vidriales valley, within the region of Benavente and Los Valles and the municipality of Granucillo. Its municipal district is characterised by its remarkable wealth of landscape.

== History ==
In the Middle Ages, the territory in which Cunquilla sits was integrated into the Kingdom of León, whose monarchs would have undertaken the foundation of the village.

Subsequently, in the Modern Age, Cunquilla was one of the localities that were integrated into the province of the Lands of the Count of Benavente and, within this, into the Merindad de Vidriales and the receptoría de Benavente.

When the provinces were restructured and the current provinces were created in 1833, Cunquilla became part of the province of Zamora, within the Region of León, and in 1834 it was integrated into the judicial district of Benavente.
