= León, Spain (disambiguation) =

León, Spain can mean:

- León (province), Spain
- León, León, capital of the León province in Spain
- León (historical region), composed of the Spanish provinces León, Salamanca, and Zamora
- Kingdom of León (historical)
