= Kingdom of Toledo (Crown of Castile) =

Former country

Kingdom of Toledo Reino de Toledo
- Realm of Castile; after 1230: Crown of Castile
- 1085–1833
- Royal Banner Coat of arms

- The Kingdom of Toledo in 1590.
- Capital: Toledo
- Historical era: Middle Ages
  - Capture of Toledo: 25 May 1085
  - Territorial division: 20 November 1833
Preceded by	Succeeded by
Taifa of Toledo	New Castile (Spain)
- Today part of: Spain

The Kingdom of Toledo (Spanish: Reino de Toledo) was a realm in the central Iberian Peninsula, created after the capture of Toledo by Alfonso VI of León in 1085. It continued in existence until 1833; its region is currently within Spain.

== Background ==
In April 1065, Emir Al-Muqtadir of Zaragoza besieged Barbastro, aided by 500 Sevillian knights. The governor, Count Ermengol III of Urgel, was killed in a sortie, and a few days later the city fell, whereupon the Spanish and French garrison was put to the sword, thus bringing an end to Pope Alexander II's Crusade of Barbastro against the Moors of Spain.

At around the same time, Emir Al-Muqtadir broke off relationships with Castile, and Ferdinand I led a punitive expedition into Zaragoza—taking Alquezar—and then into Valencia. Despite being a tributary of Castile, emir Al-Mamun of Toledo led a force in support of his son-in-law, Emir Abd al-Malik. Mamun subsequently dethroned Abd al-Malik and incorporated Valencia into the Kingdom of Toledo. Ferdinand fell dangerously ill and retired from the field. Ferdinand died in December 1065, and his empire was divided between his three sons: Sancho II in Castile, Alfonso VI in León, and García in Galicia.

In May 1085, after skillfully managing to pit the several Muslim kings against each other and defeating a coalition of the taifas of Seville, Badajoz and Zaragoza, Alfonso VI was able to enter the city of Toledo; the latter's taifa was incorporated with Castile and the city was made the capital of León and Castile. The former taifa lands remained subject to a long struggle with its Muslim neighbors, at least until the battle of Las Navas de Tolosa and the rioting and blood bath against the Jews of Toledo (1212 CE).

The Muslim-led Kingdom of Toledo became a subordinate Christian-led southern realm of the Crown of Castille, having its own court and rulers. As the lands became more homogeneous, by the 18th century the territory was denominated New Castile, differentiating the southern area of Castile from the northern lands of Old Castile. The old Kingdom of Toledo was disestablished in 1833, and its lands compose portions of several provinces of modern Spain.

== See also ==
- Almohads
