= Province of Villafranca =

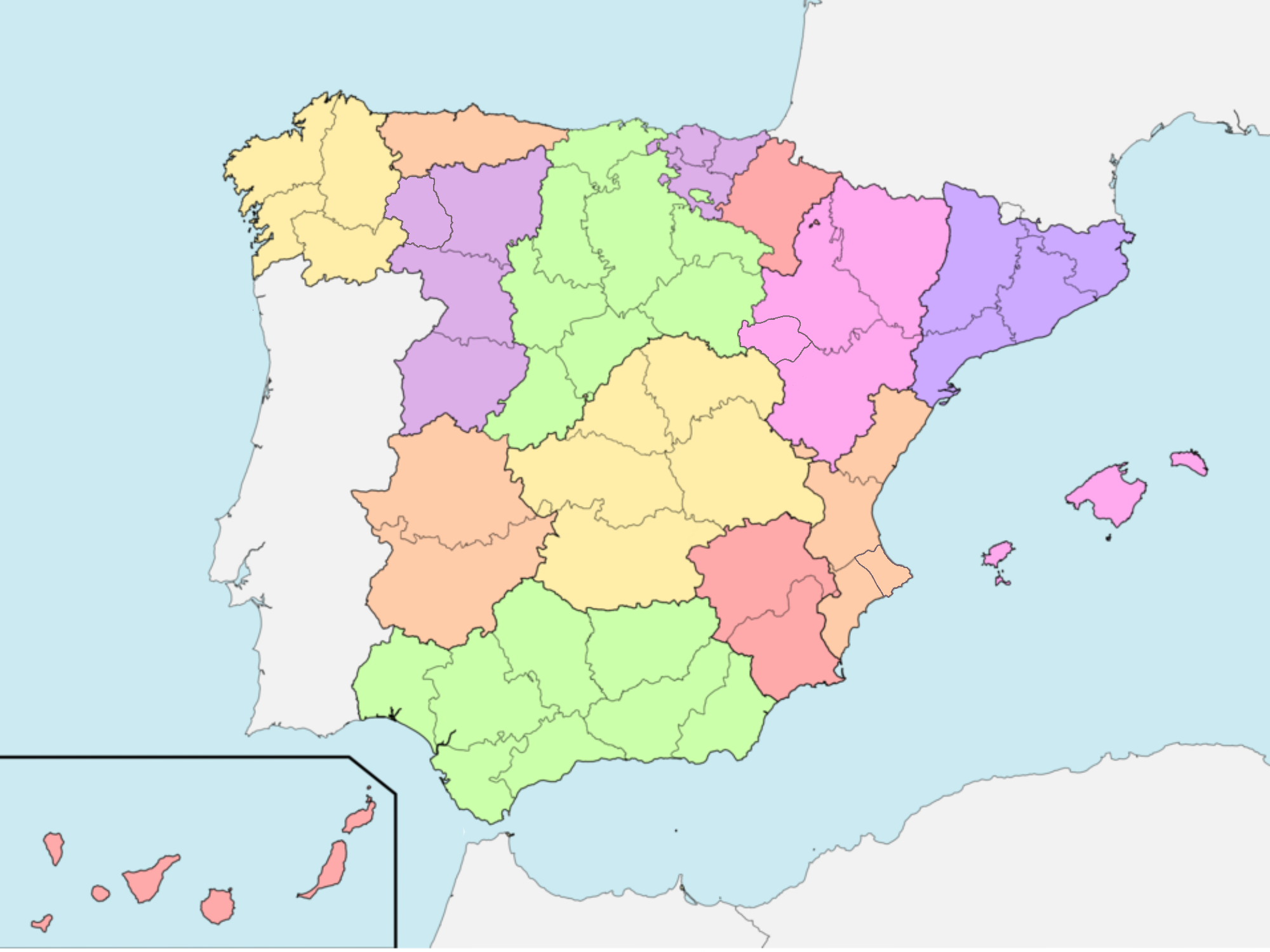
Map of the 1822 territorial division of Spain, which included the Province of Villafranca. On this map it is at the upper leftmost of the four provinces making up the region of León

The Province of Villafranca (also known as Province of Villafranca del Bierzo, Province of El Bierzo, or Province of El Vierzo) was a province of Spain created in the 1822 territorial division of Spain (27 January 1822), during the Trienio Liberal of 1820–1823. Its population of 86,365 represented 0.7% of the total Spanish population of the time. Its capital was Villafranca del Bierzo. With the restoration of absolutism, this territorial division was revoked 1 October 1823. Although Javier de Burgos's 1833 territorial division of Spain was very close to that of 1822, the province of Villafranca was not recreated; the other two major changes were the omission of the provinces of Calatayud and Játiva.

== Territories ==
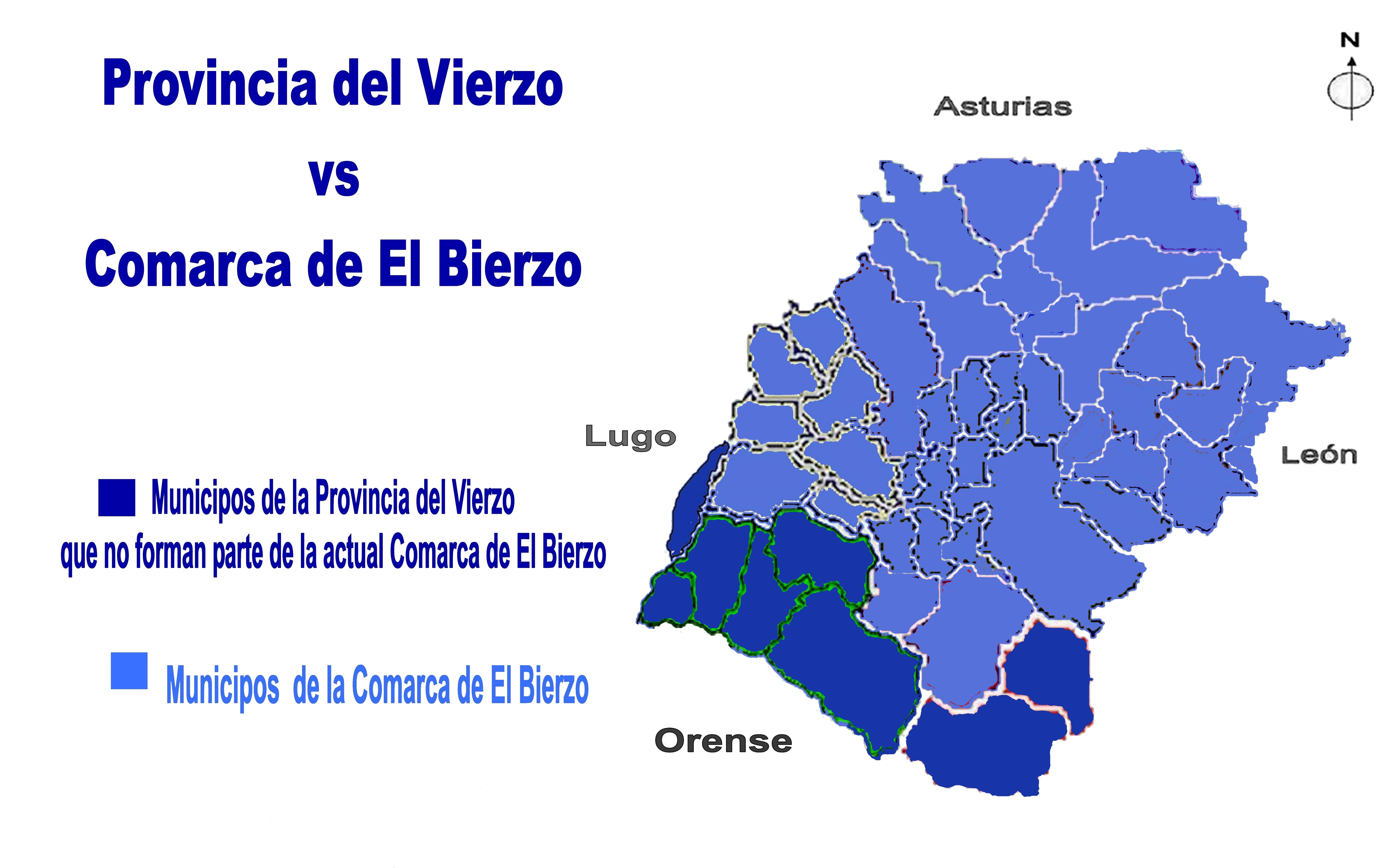
The territory of the Province of Vierzo (Province of Villafranca) compared to the present-day comarca of El Bierzo. The gray blue is the present-day comarca. The dark blue represents parts of the province that fell outside the present comarca.

The territories of the province of Villafranca included the present-day comarca of El Bierzo in the Province of León, plus several other Leonese municipalities and some other territories that now belong to the provinces of Lugo and Ourense.

Following the general pattern of the 1822 territorial division of Spain, the province was named after its capital city, Villafranca del Bierzo. However, the regionalists in this area have always favored the name El Bierzo or El Vierzo (El Bierzu in the local Bercian dialect).

== Background ==
There have been many Bercian administrative entities in the history of Spain. El Bierzo was one of the 40 provinces of the Crown of Castile under the Repartimiento of 1591. Later, until the territorial division in the 1780s by Floridablanca, it was habitually united with León and Asturias, and referred to as either the Partido de Ponferrada or the Provincia del Vierzo.

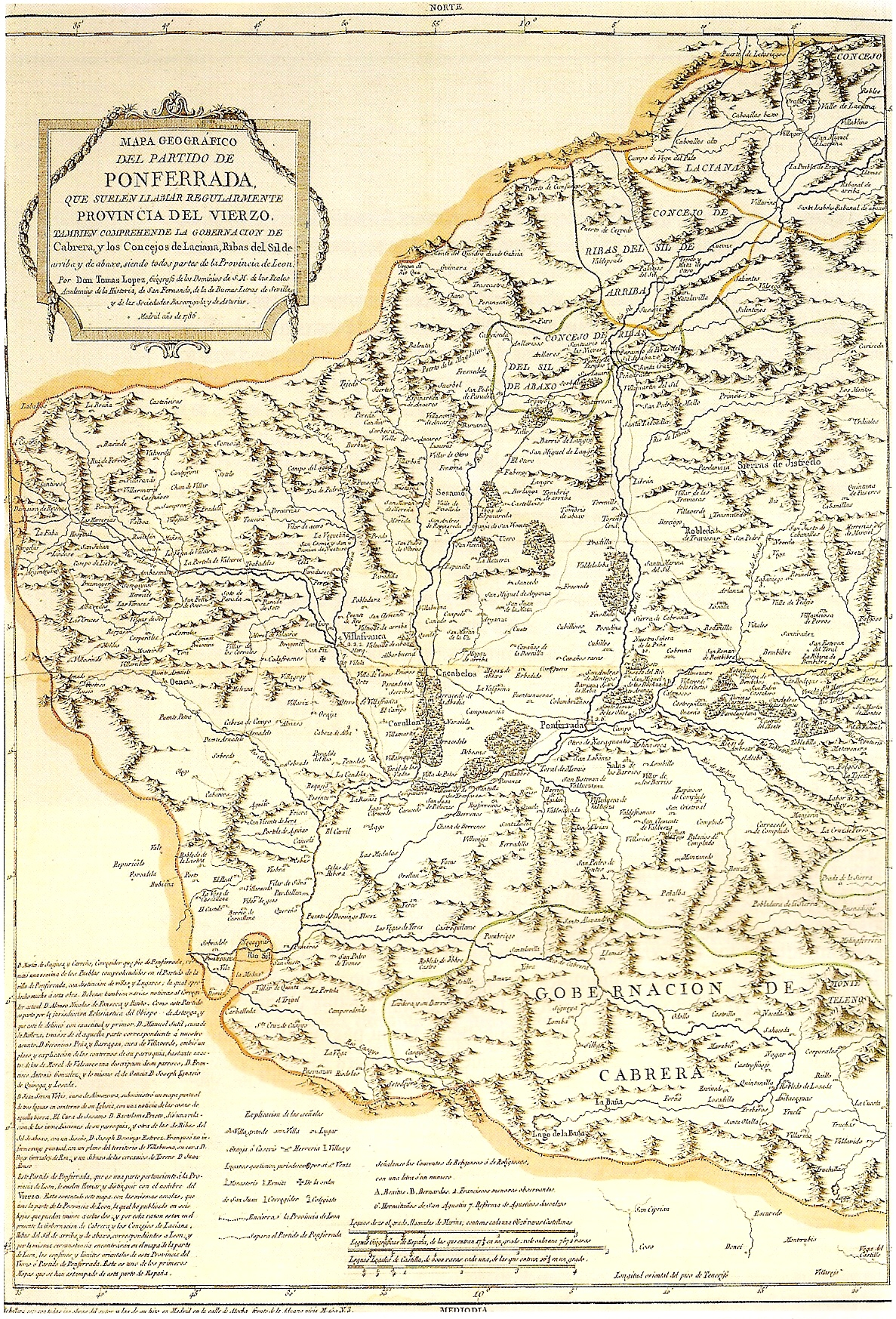
A 1786 map of the region refers to it by both the name Partido de Ponferrada and the name Provincia del Vierzo.

From 1789 to 1833 there were numerous efforts to reorganize the territory of Spain. El Bierzo was variously integrated into Province of León or the Prefecture of Astorga, or (in 1822) made a province in its own right. In this period, when conservatives and absolutists favored a system of partidos and liberals favored a division reflecting the newly rationalized departments of France, there were Bercian regionalists on both sides of that divide, each wanting the recognition of the region within whichever system they advocated.

The liberal territorial division of 1822 seemed briefly to satisfy these ambitions; however, with the return to absolutism the following year, that decree was revoked, and the 1833 territorial division, which remains largely in effect down to the present day, although hewing closely to the 1822 plan, did not include a Bercian province.
