= Province of Calatayud =

- 1822–1823
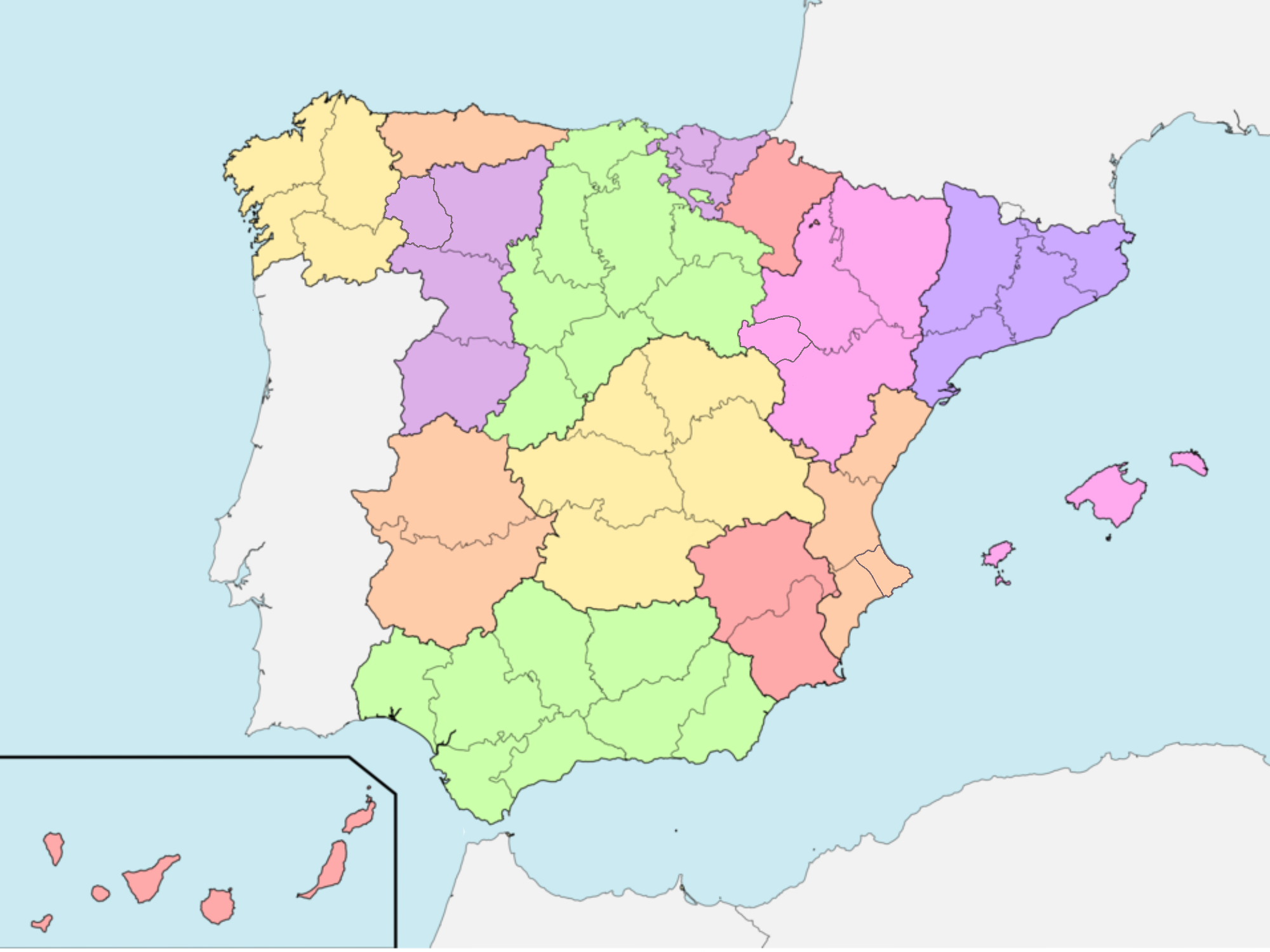
- Map of the 1822 territorial division of Spain, which included Calatayud. On this map it is the smallest of the four provinces (right of centre) making up the region of Aragon.
- Capital: Calatayud
- History
  - Established: 1822
  - Disestablished: 1823
Succeeded by
Province of Villafranca; Province of Játiva
- Today part of: Spain

The Province of Calatayud was a province of Spain created in the 1822 territorial division of Spain (27 January 1822), during the Trienio Liberal of 1820–1823. It included the Aragonese comarcas of Comunidad de Calatayud, Campo de Daroca, Aranda, the southern part of Valdejalón (now in the province of Zaragoza), the northern part of the Comarca del Jiloca (now in Teruel), as well as some municipalities that now fall in the provinces of Soria and Guadalajara. It had a population of 105,947, which constituted 0.9 percent of the Spanish population at the time. Its capital was Calatayud.

With the restoration of absolutism, this territorial division was revoked 1 October 1823. Although Javier de Burgos's 1833 territorial division of Spain was very close to that of 1833, the province of Calatayud was not recreated; the other two major changes were the omission of the provinces of Villafranca del Bierzo and Játiva.

The question of a province of Calatayud was reopened in 1842, but firm opposition from the provinces of Guadalajara, Soria and Zaragoza led to the defeat of the proposal.
