= Castile (historical region) =

Historical region of Spain

Castile or Castille (/kæˈstiːl/ kast-EEL; Spanish: Castilla [kasˈtiʎa]) is a territory of imprecise limits located in Spain. The Encyclopædia Britannica defines it as encompassing Old Castile and New Castile, as they were formally defined in the 1833 territorial division of Spain.

Castile's name is generally thought to mean "land of castles" (castle in Spanish is castillo), in reference to the castles built in the area to consolidate the Christian Reconquest from the Moors.

== History ==
Originally an eastern county of the kingdom of León, in the 11th century, Castile became an independent realm with its capital at Burgos. The County of Castile, which originally included most of Burgos and parts of Vizcaya, Álava, Cantabria and La Rioja, became the leading force in the northern Christian states' 800-year Reconquista ("reconquest") of central and southern Spain from the Moorish rulers who had dominated most of the peninsula since the early 8th century.

The capture of Toledo in 1085 added New Castile to the crown's territories, and the battle of Las Navas de Tolosa (1212) heralded the Moors' loss of most of southern Spain. The kingdom of León was integrated in the Crown of Castile in 1230, and the following decades saw the capture of Córdoba (1236), Murcia (1243) and Seville (1248). By the Treaty of Alcaçovas with Portugal on March 6, 1460, the ownership of the Canary Islands was transferred to Castile.

The dynastic union of Castile and Aragon in 1469, when Ferdinand II of Aragon wed Isabella I of Castile, would eventually lead to the formal creation of Spain as a single entity in 1516 when their grandson Charles V assumed both thrones. See List of Spanish monarchs and Kings of Spain family tree. The Muslim Kingdom of Granada (roughly encompassing the modern day provinces of Granada, Malaga and Almeria) was conquered in 1492, formally passing to the Crown of Castile in that year.

== Geography ==
Since it lacks official recognition, Castile does not have clearly defined borders. Historically, the area consisted of the Kingdom of Castile. After the kingdom merged with its neighbours to become the Crown of Castile and later the Kingdom of Spain, when it united with the Crown of Aragon and the Kingdom of Navarre, the definition of what constituted Castile gradually began to change. Its historical capital was Burgos. In modern Spain, it is generally considered to comprise Castile and León and Castile–La Mancha, with Madrid as its centre. West Castile and León, Albacete, Cantabria and La Rioja are sometimes included in the definition (controversial for historical, political, and cultural reasons).

Since 1982 there have been two nominally Castilian autonomous communities in Spain, incorporating the toponym in their own official names: Castile and Leon and Castile-La Mancha. A third, the Community of Madrid is also regarded as part of Castile, by dint of its geographic enclosure within the entity and, above all, by the statements of its Statute of Autonomy, since its autonomic process originated in national interest and not in popular disaffection with Castile.

Other territories in the former Crown of Castile are left out for different reasons. The territory of the Castilian Crown actually comprised all other autonomous communities within Spain with the exception of Aragon, Balearic Islands, Valencia and Catalonia, all belonging to the former Crown of Aragon, and Navarre, offshoot of the older Kingdom of the same name. Castile was divided between Old Castile in the north, so called because it was where the Kingdom of Castile was founded, and New Castile, called the Kingdom of Toledo in the Middle Ages. The Leonese region, part of the Crown of Castile from 1230, was from medieval times considered a region in its own right on a par with the two Castiles, and appeared on maps alongside Old Castile until the two joined as one region - Castile and Leon - in the 1980s. In 1833, Spain was further subdivided into administrative provinces.

Two non-administrative, nominally Castilian regions existed from 1833 to 1982: Old Castile, including Santander (autonomous community of Cantabria since 1981), Burgos, Logroño (autonomous community of La Rioja since 1982), Palencia, Valladolid, Soria, Segovia and Ávila, and New Castile consisting of Madrid (autonomous community of Madrid since 1983), Guadalajara, Cuenca, Toledo and Ciudad Real.

== Language ==
The language of Castile emerged as the primary language of Spain—known to many of its speakers as castellano and in English sometimes as Castilian, but generally as Spanish. See Names given to the Spanish language. Historically, the Castilian Kingdom and people were considered to be the main architects of the Spanish State by a process of expansion to the South against the Moors and of marriages, wars, assimilation, and annexation of their smaller Eastern and Western neighbours. From the advent of the Bourbon Monarchy following the War of the Spanish Succession until the arrival of parliamentary democracy in 1977, the Castilian language was the only one with official status in the Spanish state.

== Maps ==
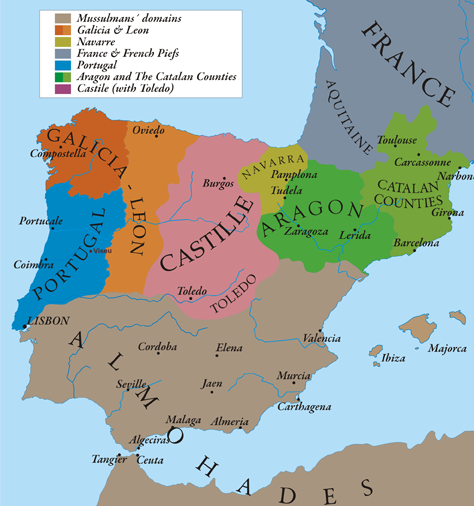
Kingdom of Castile in 1210

The kingdoms of the Crown of Castile in 1400. Note how Old Castile was called Kingdom of Castile and New Castile was called the Kingdom of Toledo.

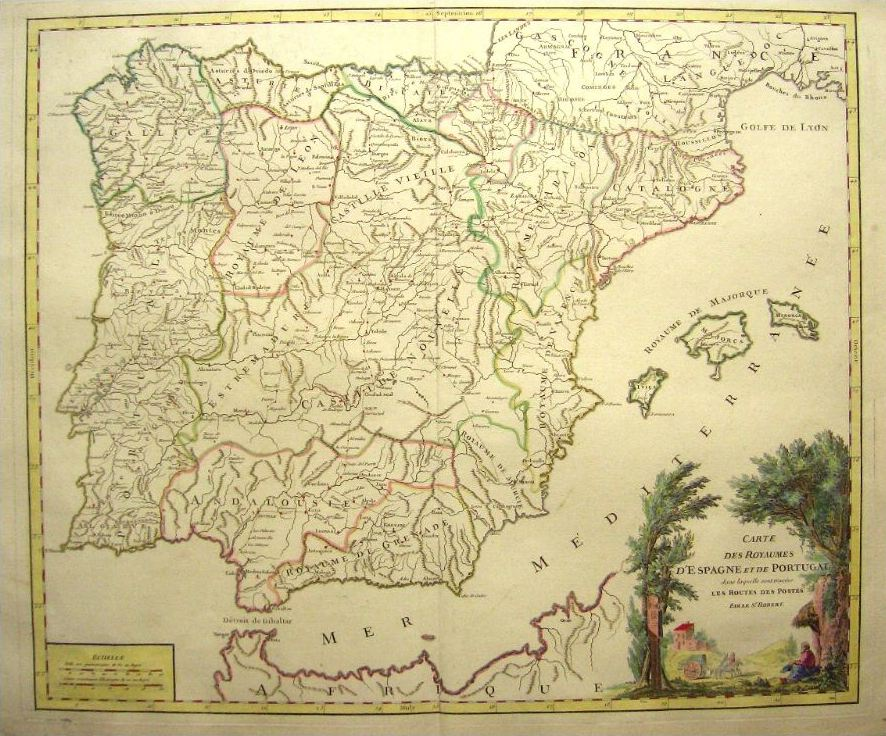
Castile and other Iberian regions in 1770

The regions of Old Castile and New Castile (1833 until the early 1980s).

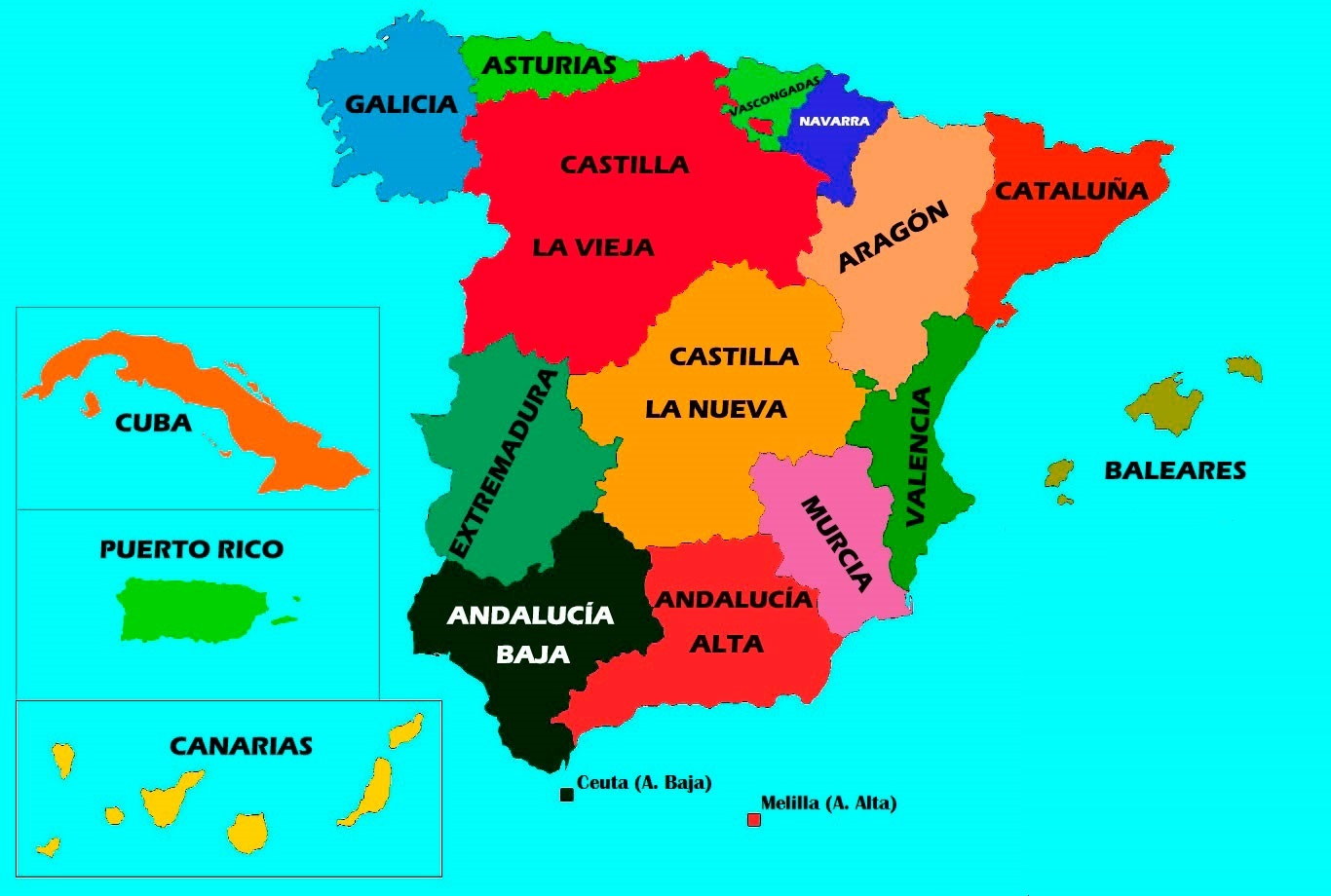
Federal states proposed in the 1st Spanish Republic according to Constitution in 1873. There is an Old and New Castile.

Autonomous communities that use "Castile" in their names (since the 1980s), plus the community of Madrid. The Leonese region joined with Old Castile, Albacete region joined with New Castile, while Cantabria, La Rioja and Madrid became administrative regions of their own.

== See also ==
- Castilian people
