= Province of Játiva =

Coordinates: 38.9011°N 0.4600°W

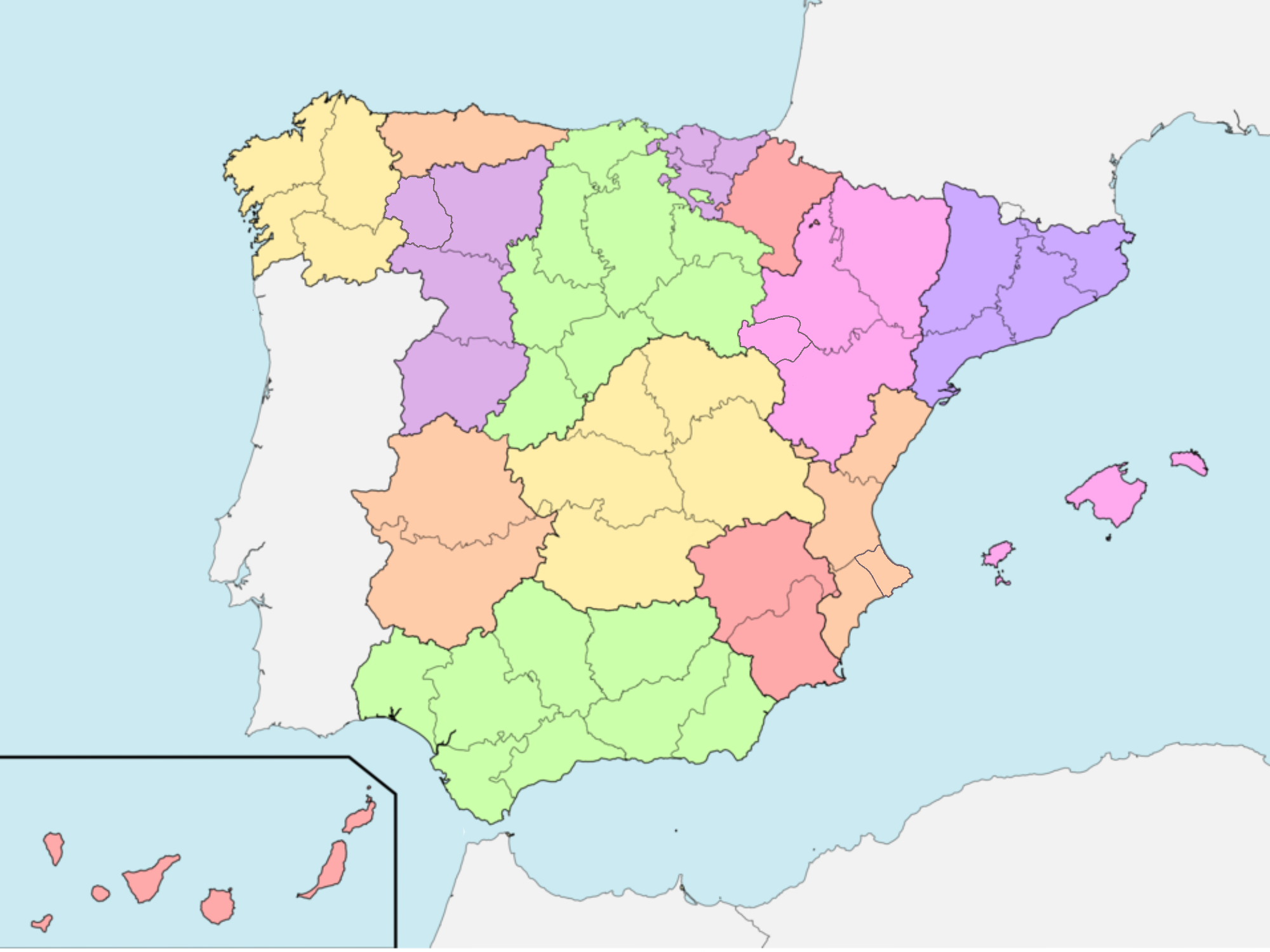
Map of the 1822 territorial division of Spain, which included Játiva. On this map it is the smallest of the four provinces (near lower right) making up the region of Valencia.

The Province of Játiva was a province of Spain created in the 1822 territorial division of Spain (27 January 1822), during the Trienio Liberal of 1820–1823. Its population of 164,795 represented 1.41% of the total Spanish population of the time. Its capital was Játiva (currently officially named Xàtiva). With the restoration of absolutism, this territorial division was revoked 1 October 1823. Although Javier de Burgos's 1833 territorial division of Spain was very close to that of 1822, the province of Játiva was not recreated; the other two major changes were the omission of the provinces of Calatayud and Villafranca del Bierzo.

The province of Játiva was divided among the provinces of Valencia and Alicante, with the cities of Játiva and Cofrentes becoming part of Valencia and Gandía, Denia, Onteniente and Albaida becoming part of Alicante. These borders were adjusted in 1836, and Alicante lost the northern part of its territory to Valencia; as a result, except for Denia, all of the former province of Játiva is now part of Valencia.
