= Province of Asturias =

Province of Spain (1833-1982)

Province of Asturias Provincia de Asturias
- Province of Spain
- Coat of arms

- Coordinates: 43°22′42.92″N 5°51′44.61″W
- Country: Spain
- Autonomous community: Asturias Principality of Asturias
- Capital city: Oviedo

Area
  - Total: 10,603.57 km^{2} (4,094.06 sq mi)

Population
  - Total: 500.000 in 1,833; 1.120.000 in 1,983
- Borders: • Province of Cantabria • Province of León • Province of Lugo

The province of Asturias is a Spanish province, which since 1982 has formed the single-province autonomous community of the Principality of Asturias. Between 1833 and 1983 it was called the province of Oviedo.

== History ==
It was created in November 1833, with the name of its capital, the city of Oviedo, within the territorial division of 1833, which divided Spain into provinces. In its constitution it included the territories of the historical comarca of Asturias de Oviedo, to which was added the territory of the current councils of Ribadedeva, Peñamellera Alta and Peñamellera Baja. These municipalities previously belonged to Asturias de Santillana and, since 1778, to the province of Cantabria.

Its creation meant the end of the General Junta of the Principality of Asturias as the governing body of the province, which was left in the hands of the Provincial Deputation of Oviedo. On 31 October 1835, the last minutes of the sessions of the General Assemblies and Provincial Councils of the Principality of Asturias were signed to give way to the Provincial Council.

With Law 1/1983, of 5 April 1983, on the change of name of the current province of Oviedo to the province of Asturias, the eighth transitory provision of the Statute of Autonomy of Asturias was complied with, changing its name to the current one. The number plates remained with the code O, although there were some moves to change it to AS.

== Coat of arms ==
The province of Oviedo already had as its coat of arms the current coat of arms of Asturias, with the Victory Cross, but with a princely crown. This coat of arms was maintained, with minor variations, until its officialisation in 1984 as the coat of arms of the autonomous community, with a royal crown at the helm, according to Jovellanos' description, due to “the very condition of the territory of Asturias, always a land of royalty”.

== See also ==
- Provincial Deputation of Oviedo
