= Judicial districts of Spain =

Area where a particular court has jurisdiction

In Spain, a judicial district (Spanish: Partido judicial) is a territorial unit for the administration of justice, composed of one or more municipalities bordering and within the same province.

One of the municipalities that make up the judicial district, usually the largest or the one that deals with the highest number of legal matters, is the seat of one or more courts of first instance and instruction. The remaining municipalities of the district have magistrates' courts.

In addition to their primary function, judicial districts are also the constituencies for the election of provincial councils.

== History ==
Map of Conventus in Roman times.

The first division that was done in Spain on legal grounds would be during the Roman Empire. The provinces are divided into conventus where the inhabitants of the district regularly met in the header to resolve legal issues. The people could go to either conventus according to their convenience and the distance that separated them, that is why the boundaries were unclear.

The first modern division of Spain in judicial districts was held in 1834 -through an approved Decree 21 April 1834 in which provinces- subdivided following the new provincial management of Javier de Burgos. Among the motivations employment decree games constituency in the elections to Parliament of the Kingdom, was and facilitates faster receivership. 1 in 1834 were recorded in Spain, except the provinces provincial, a total of 451 matches judicial (Note: Until 1841 it was not possible to enforce a division in judicial parties of the Basque provinces and Navarra.).

Currently the number of these, variable throughout history, has been reduced. These divisions would be the basis for electoral districts and contribution. In 1868 there were 463 judicial districts and 8,000 municipalities. The judicial districts of the autonomous cities of Ceuta and Melilla are the 12th (Cádiz) and the 8th (Málaga).

== Lists by autonomous community ==
Spain is currently divided into 432 judicial districts.

Autonomous community/city	Districts	Spanish
Judicial districts of Andalusia	85	(list)
Judicial districts of Aragon	16	(list)
Judicial districts of Asturias	18	(list)
Judicial districts of the Balearic Islands	6	(list)
Judicial districts of the Basque Country	14	(list)
Judicial districts of the Canary Islands	20	(list)
Judicial districts of Cantabria	8	(list)
Judicial districts of Castilla-La Mancha	31	(list)
Judicial districts of Castilla and Leon	42	(list)
Judicial districts of Catalonia	49	(list)
Judicial district of Ceuta	1	(article)
Judicial districts of Extremadura	21	(list)
Judicial districts of Galicia	45	(list)
Judicial districts of La Rioja	3	(list)
Judicial districts of the Community of Madrid	21	(list)
Judicial district of Melilla	1	(article)
Judicial districts of the Region of Murcia	11	(list)
Judicial districts of Navarre	5	(list)
Judicial districts of the Valencian Community	35	(list)
