= Granucillo =

Coordinates: 42°03′N 5°55′W

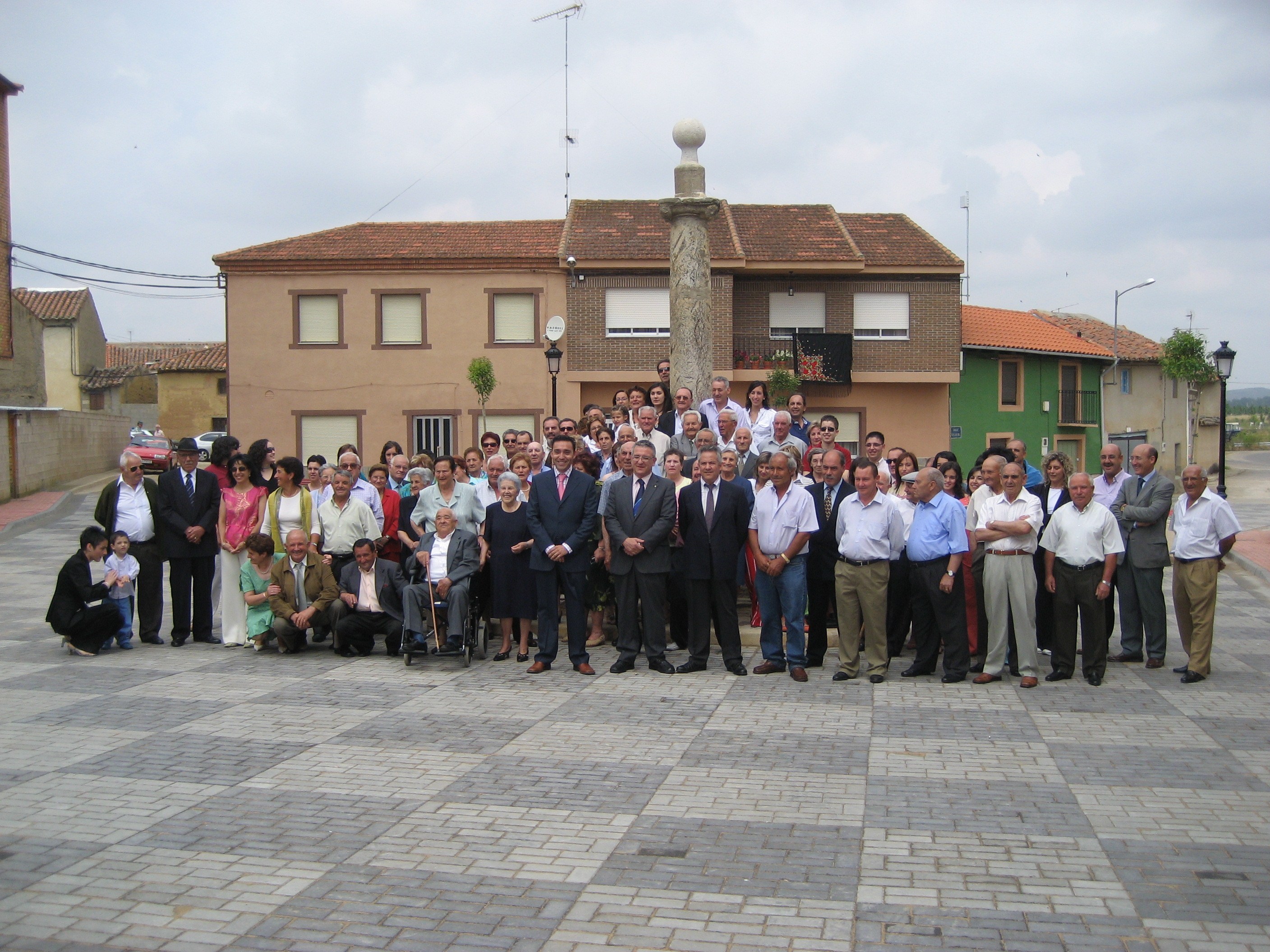
- Interactive map of Granucillo
- Country: Spain
- Autonomous community: Castile and León
- Province: Zamora
- Municipality: Granucillo

Area
  - Total: 32 km^{2} (12 sq mi)

Population (2025-01-01)
  - Total: 105
  - Density: 3.3/km^{2} (8.5/sq mi)
- Time zone: UTC+1 (CET)
  - Summer (DST): UTC+2 (CEST)
- Website: www.aytogranucillo.es

Granucillo is a municipality located in the province of Zamora, Castile and León, Spain. According to the 2004 census (INE), the municipality has a population of 235 inhabitants.
