= Oceloduri =

Ancient settlement in central Spain

Oceloduri was an ancient Vaccean settlement in Spain near the modern town of Zamora.
