= Old Castile =

Historic region of Spain

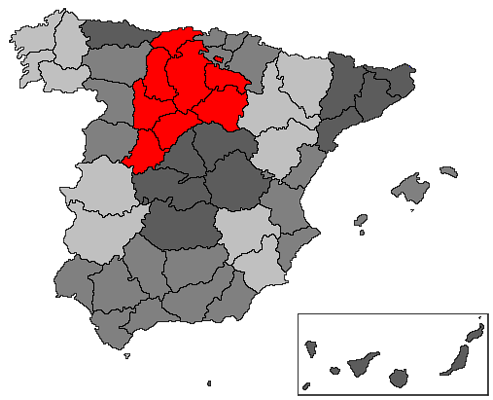
The region of Old Castile, as defined in the 1833 territorial division of Spain.

Old Castile (Spanish: Castilla la Vieja [kasˈtiʎa la ˈβjexa]) is a historic region of Spain, which had different definitions across the centuries. Its extent was formally defined in the 1833 territorial division of Spain as the sum of the following provinces: Santander (now Cantabria), Burgos, Logroño (now La Rioja), Soria, Segovia, Ávila, Valladolid and Palencia. As the rest of regions in that division, Old Castile never had any special administrative agency; only the individual provinces had their own management.

== History ==
The name Old Castile reflects the fact that this territory corresponds roughly to the extent of the Kingdom of Castile around the 11th century, before it expanded to the south. This kingdom had its origins in the 9th century in an area now comprising Cantabria, Álava, and Burgos province.

In the 18th century, Charles III of Spain assigned to Castilla la Vieja the provinces of Burgos, Soria, Segovia, Ávila, Valladolid, and Palencia.

The royal decree of 30 November 1833, the reform of Javier de Burgos (see 1833 territorial division of Spain), established the basis for the division of Spain into provinces which, with very few modifications, continues down to the present day.

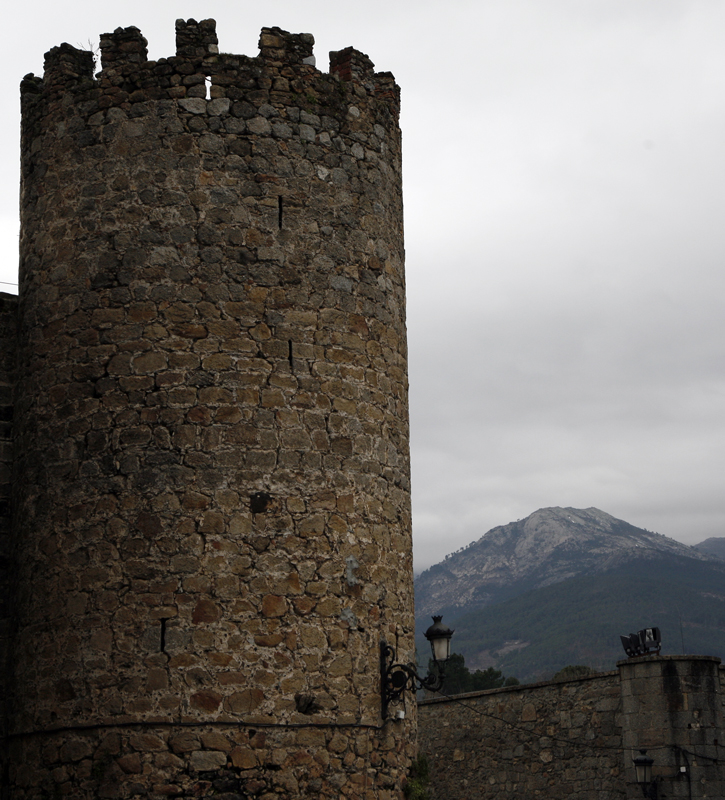
Castle in Arenas de San Pedro (Ávila), built in 1393

Another royal decree, on 30 November 1855, divided Spain into 49 provinces, and assigned the provinces of Valladolid and Palencia to the Kingdom of León, leaving to Castilla la Vieja the provinces of Santander, Burgos, Logroño, Soria, Segovia, and Ávila. Although there were further reform efforts in the 19th century, this division is reflected in the encyclopedias, geographies, and textbooks from the mid-19th century until it was superseded in the second half of the 20th century. For example, early editions of Enciclopedia Espasa, of the Encyclopædia Britannica and the popular student encyclopedia Álvarez all follow this division of provinces into Castilla la Vieja and the Region of León.

With the establishment of the autonomous communities in Spain in 1983, Old Castile disappeared as a legal entity: most of its provinces were integrated politically with the Region of León into a larger entity (Castile and León), and two of its provinces became autonomous communities in their own right (the province of Santander became Cantabria and the province of Logroño became La Rioja).

== See also ==
- Castile (historical region)
- New Castile
- Castile and León
