= New Castile (Spain) =

Historic region of Spain

Coordinates: 39°48′N 3°03′W

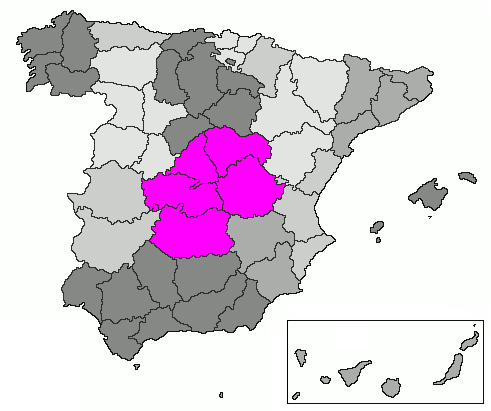
Map of Castilla la Nueva between 1851 and the 1980s

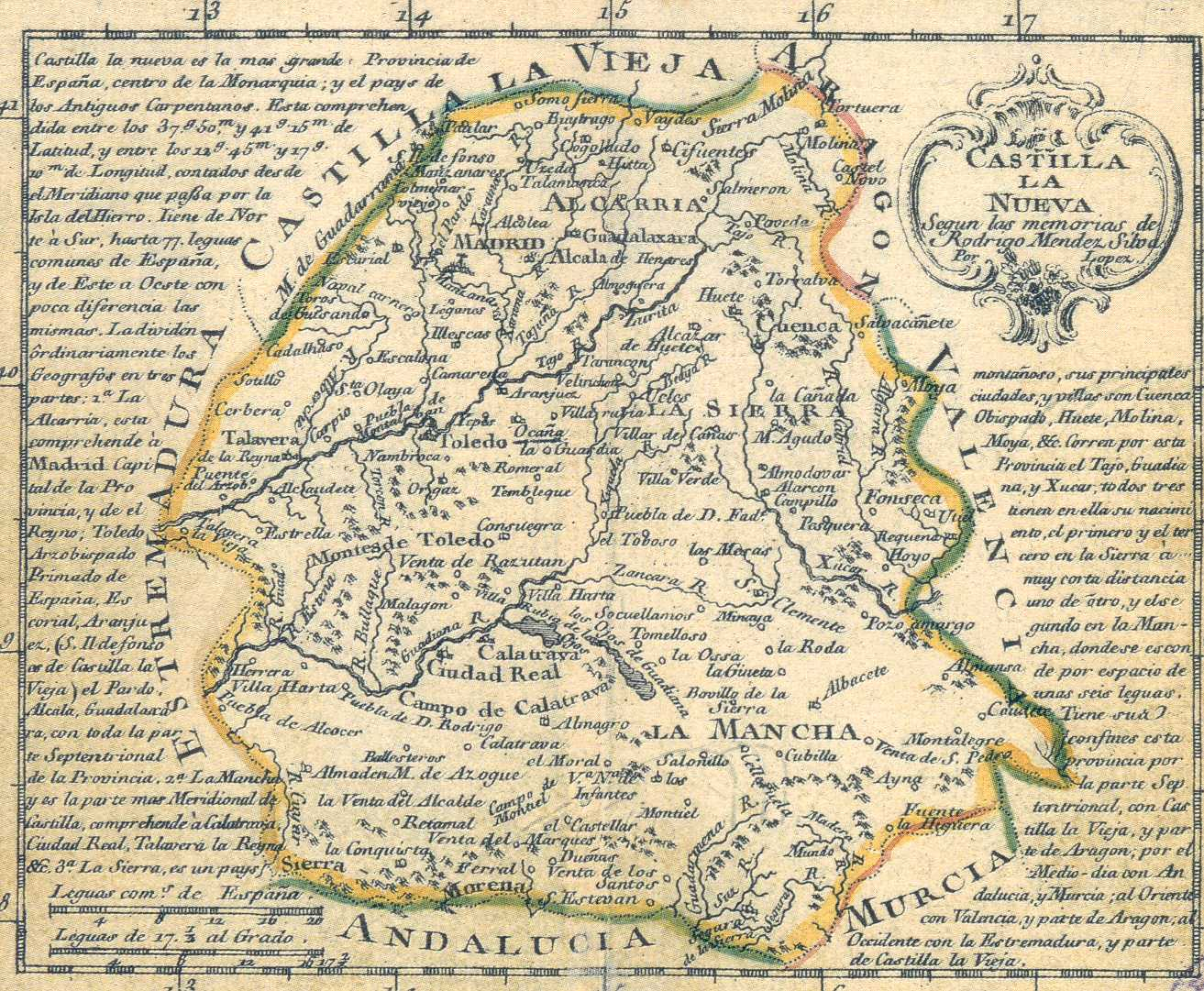
New Castile in 1785.

New Castile (Spanish: Castilla la Nueva [kasˈtiʎa la ˈnweβa]) is a historic region of Spain. It roughly corresponds to the medieval Moorish Taifa of Toledo, taken during the Reconquista of the peninsula by Christians and thus becoming the southern part of Castile. The extension of New Castile was formally defined after the 1833 territorial division of Spain as the sum of the following provinces: Ciudad Real, Cuenca, Guadalajara, Madrid and Toledo.

Key to the reconquest of New Castile were the capture of Toledo in 1085, ending the Taifa of Toledo, and the Battle of Las Navas de Tolosa in 1212. It continued to be formally called Kingdom of Toledo even though it was under the Crown of Castile. Then it started to be called New Castile in the 18th century.

New Castile is separated from Old Castile to the north by the Sistema Central range of mountains. In the current territorial division of Spain, it covers the autonomous communities of Madrid and Castile–La Mancha (which also includes Albacete).

== See also ==
- Castile (historical region)
- Old Castile
- Castile–La Mancha
- Nueva Castilla in the Spanish East Indies
- Nueva Castilla in Spanish America
