= 1833 territorial division of Spain =

Administrative reorganization of Spain into provinces

Map of the 1833 territorial division of Spain into regions (colored) and provinces (outlined).

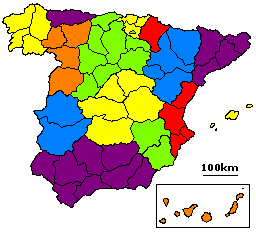
Map of the similar 1822 territorial division of Spain. The 1822 territorial division only defined provinces; the historical regions indicated by colors were not defined until 1833.

The 1833 territorial division of Spain divided the country into provinces, in turn classified into "historic regions" (Spanish: regiones históricas). This division was followed (helped by the enforcing of the 1834 Royal Statute) by the ensuing creation of provincial deputations, the government institutions for most of the provinces, remaining up to this date. Nearly all of the provinces retain roughly or precisely the 1833 borders. (Note: Five provinces have changed their names to reflect local languages other than Castilian Spanish and three to match the name of a coterminous autonomous community.) Conversely, many of the historic regions correspond to present-day autonomous communities.

== Background ==
Immediately after the death of King Ferdinand VII on 29 September 1833, the regent Queen Maria Christina attempted to find a moderate third way between the absolutist Carlists—the followers of the Infante Carlos—and the liberals. This mission was given to First Secretary of State Francisco Cea Bermúdez, leader of a government that lasted only into the following January, having been unable to satisfy either side. Despite his vain efforts to gain the support of either the liberals or the Carlists, his government undertook a major reform of the territorial division of Spain whose effects are felt two centuries later: the division of Spain into provinces.

A royal decree of 20 November 1833 ratified a plan put forth by Javier de Burgos, secretary of state for development (secretario de estado de Fomento), which created the basis for a centralized state divided into 49 provinces. All but four of the provinces received the name of their capital cities; those four—Navarre with its capital at Pamplona, Álava with Vitoria, Gipuzkoa with San Sebastián, and Biscay (Spanish: Vizcaya) with Bilbao—reflected long standing entities, and retained their historic names.

Javier de Burgos's division is practically the same as the short-lived 1822 territorial division of Spain, dating from the "Liberal Trienium" (Trienio Liberal), but without the provinces of Calatayud, Vierzo, and Játiva; also, in contrast to the 1822 division, several provinces were given names other than those of their capitals.

Rather than the merit of having initiated, directed and produced a new provincial division of Spain, Don Javier de Burgos deserves credit for the courage and political will have put in place the previous division of 1822 with the adjustments and modifications that he believed appropriate.

— Gonzalo Martínez Díez

== Provincial division and "historic regions" ==
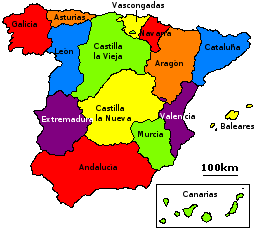
The "historic regions" of Spain, as listed in the 1833 decree.

Javier de Burgos' 1833 provincial division included 49 provinces. The same decree that created the provincial division grouped the provinces into "historic regions". However, these were merely honorary and classificatory: there was no level of administration between the central government and the provinces. These "historic regions" had no powers, no administrative organs, no common jurisdiction over the provinces grouped within them. Each province had a governor (jefe político, "political chief") appointed by the central government.

1833 historic regions and provinces
Historic region	Provinces
Andalusia	Almería, Cádiz, Córdoba, Granada, Huelva, Jaén, Málaga, Sevilla
Aragon	Huesca, Teruel, Zaragoza
Asturias	Oviedo
Balearic Islands	Palma de Mallorca
Canary Islands	Santa Cruz de Tenerife (which also included the present-day province of Las Palmas)
New Castile	Ciudad Real, Cuenca, Guadalajara, Madrid, Toledo
Old Castile	Ávila, Burgos, Logroño, Palencia, Santander, Segovia, Soria, Valladolid
Catalonia	Barcelona, Girona, Lleida, Tarragona
Extremadura	Badajoz, Cáceres
Galicia	A Coruña, Lugo, Ourense, Pontevedra
León	León, Salamanca, Zamora
Murcia	Albacete, Murcia
Navarre	Navarre
Valencia	Alicante, Castellón, Valencia
Basque Provinces	Álava, Gipuzkoa, Vizcaya
Source: Real Decreto de 30 de noviembre de 1833

Besides looking to the 1822 arrangement, Javier de Burgos took as his model the departments of France. While many of the borders and inclusions in the provinces may at first appear arbitrary from a historical and geographical point of view, he was operating under a set of rational criteria: area (it was intended to be possible to travel between the capital and any point in the province in a single day), population (wherever feasible, the provinces had populations between 100,000 and 400,000), and geographic coherence.

The provincial division restored the traditional names of the Basque provinces and Navarre, which had been renamed in the 1822 territorial division of Spain, but few concessions were made to historic enclaves and exclaves. The most important of these that were retained were the Rincón de Ademuz (part of Valencia, but located between Teruel and Cuenca) and the Treviño enclave (part of Burgos, but surrounded by Álava); another notable exclave is Llívia (part of Gerona, but one must pass 3 kilometres (1.9 mi) through France to reach it).

The provincial division consolidated rapidly and remains with rather few changes down to the present day. This is in part because the provincial capitals all became the seats of basic government institutions. The jefes políticos would eventually be replaced by civil governors, and eventually delegates of the central government. The provincial division was followed by all branches of government and formed the basis for all future divisions and combinations. Each of Spain's municipalities (ayuntamientos) falls within a single province.

In 1834, Spain was divided into legal districts (partidos judiciales); these took provincial borders into account. These legal districts later became the basis of electoral districts and tax districts. Civil health districts also followed provincial lines (though military health districts sometimes did not). By 1868 there were 463 legal districts; the number of municipalities has repeatedly risen and fallen.

== Conflict with the Basque districts ==
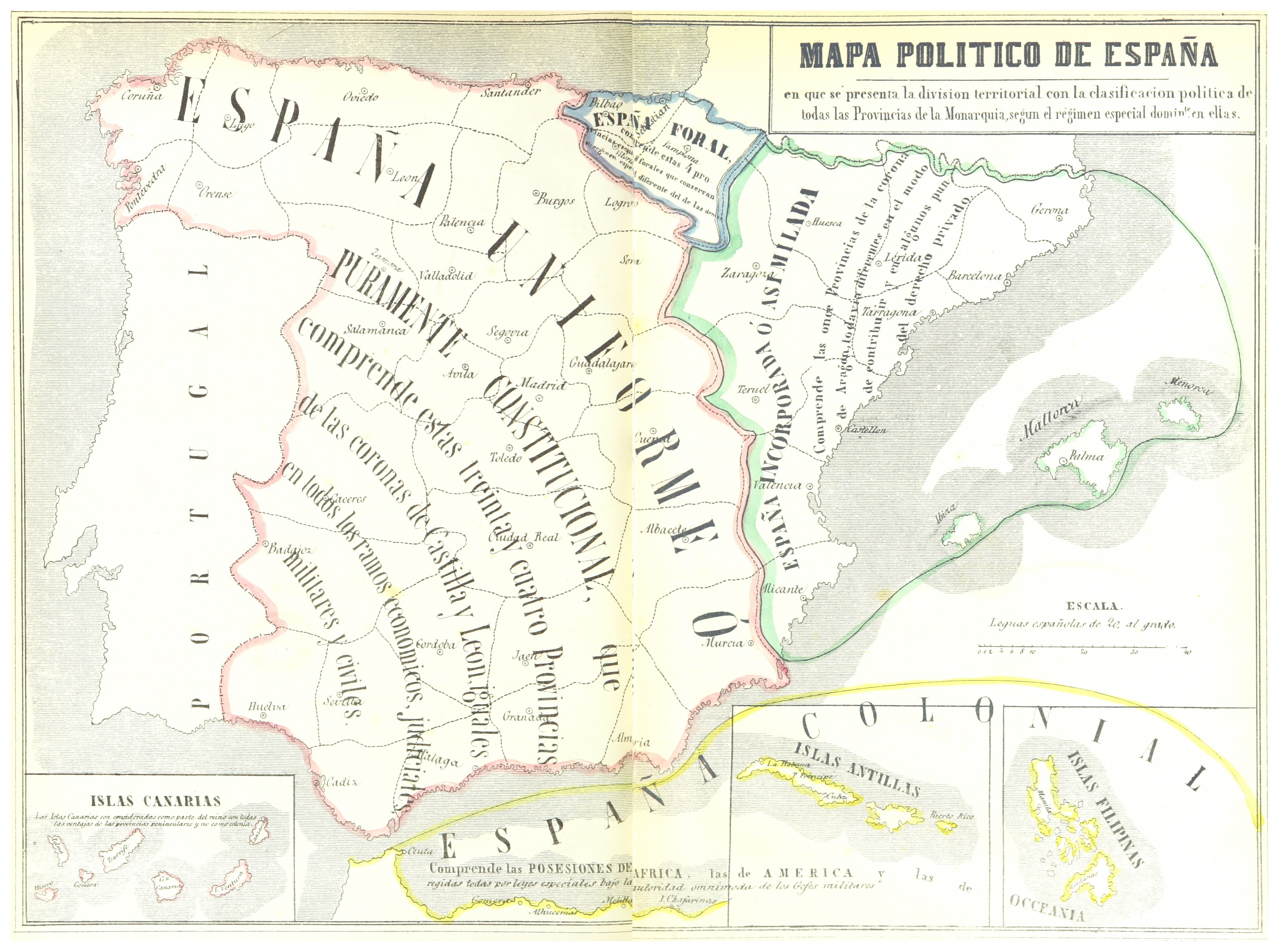
Different legal jurisdictions of Spain by 1850

The new design arranged by Jorge de Burgos and government officials in Madrid opened a scenario of overt confrontation with the Basque territories and institutions, who kept a separate legal and institutional status, including taxation and customs with the Spanish heartland on the Ebro. Navarre was still a semi-autonomous kingdom with its own parliament and government—the Cortes and Diputación—while Álava, Gipuzkoa and Biscay (the Basque Provinces, known also as "Biscay" up to the Peninsular War), were also autonomous. News of the central government's decision overruling native institutions spread to the Basque districts, sparking uproar and anger. The new design thus notably paved the way to the outbreak of the First Carlist War.

While Jorge de Burgos' design of provincial Spain suppressed enclaves, it did keep the ones located in Basque territories—Valle de Villaverde in Biscay, and Treviño in Álava. According to the new arrangement, the Basque enclaves were to be attached to the closer Spanish province of Common Fiscal Regime. That meant they would be paying taxes to Madrid, not to the relevant Basque government (Álava, Biscay). Oñate was incorporated into Guipuzcoa—definitely in 1845. Despite their close ties of cultural, linguistic, institutional, and legal nature (cf. fueros), it was decided to nominally regroup the above districts into two different "historic regions": Provincias Vascongadas and Navarra.

== Later modifications ==
As remarked above, the 1833 system of provinces has undergone only minimal changes. Jefes políticos were replaced by civil governors, and eventually by delegates and sub-delegates of the central government. There were a few minor adjustments of borders, and several provinces have been renamed to accord with local languages or in view of other issues of regional identity. The "historic regions" went by the wayside during the Spanish transition to democracy in the later 1970s and early 1980s, when they were replaced by the autonomous communities, many of which coincide precisely with an earlier "historic region". Some authors writing about present-day Spain use the term "historic regions" to refer only to the Basque Country, Catalonia, usually Galicia, and occasionally Andalusia, all of which have historically had the strong local nationalisms.

- In 1836 some territory was transferred from Alicante to Valencia, while Villena was transferred from Albacete to Alicante and Sax from Murcia to Alicante.
- In 1841 a decree was issued returning Logroño to its larger 1822 borders, but it was never put into practice.
- Between 1844 and 1854 the capital of Gipuzkoa was at Tolosa rather than San Sebastián.
- In 1846 the border between Ciudad Real and Albacete was adjusted, with Villarrobledo becoming part of the latter.
- In 1851 Requena and Utiel were transferred from Cuenca to Valencia.
- In 1927 the Canary Islands, previously a single province, were divided into the present-day provinces of Las Palmas and Santa Cruz de Tenerife, bringing the number of provinces to 50.
- In 1980 the province of Logroño was renamed the province of La Rioja.
- In 1982, as part of its transformation into an autonomous community, the province of Santander was renamed the province of Cantabria.
- In 1983 the province of Oviedo was renamed the province of Asturias.
- In 1992 the provinces of Gerona and Lérida changed to use their Catalan language names Girona and Lleida, respectively. License plates from Gerona/Girona were changed from "GE" to "GI".
- In 1995 the municipality of Gátova was transferred from the province of Castellón to the province of Valencia.
- In 1997, the province of Palma de Mallorca was renamed the provincia de les Illes Balears (Province of the Balearic Islands, using the Catalan name for the islands). The license plate changed from "PM" to "IB".
- In 1998 the provinces of La Coruña and Orense changed to the Galician language A Coruña and Ourense. The license plate of Orense/Ourense changed from "OR" to "OU".
- In 1999, the provinces of Valencia, Alicante and Castellón declared their Valencian names, València, Alacant and Castelló, to now be coofficial with their Spanish names.
- In the early 2000s, Guipúzcoa officially turned into Gipuzkoa, the Basque language form, as per decision made by the General Council of Gipuzkoa, ratified by the Spanish Parliament in 2011.
- In 2011, Álava and Vizcaya turned also into Araba/Álava and Bizkaia, as passed by the Spanish Parliament in 2011.

Under Article 141 of the Spanish Constitution of 1978, the provinces remain Spain's basic units of territorial organization. They are the basis for electoral constituencies (Article 68) and autonomous communities are normally formed out of one or more provinces, with no province divided between two or more autonomous communities (Article 143). The revised Statute of Autonomy of Catalonia that went into effect in August 2006 ignored the provincial division within Catalonia, replacing it with a division into seven veguerias. However, the number of senators or deputies that Catalonia contributes to Spain's parliament, the Cortes Generales: remained regulated by Article 69 of the Constitution in terms of provinces. While the veguerias project remained controversial, the Catalan government intended to put it into effect in January 2010. However, the 2010 Catalan regional election produced a new legislature which has put these plans on hold.
