= Region of León =

Coordinates: 42.46349°N 6.06171°W

Region of León Región de León, Rexón de Llión
- Historic region and proposed autonomous community of Spain
- Flag Coat of arms

- Map showing León in red on the regional map of Spain made by Javier de Burgos in 1833.
- Autonomous community: Castile and León
- Region: Spain
- Seat: León
- Largest city: Salamanca

Area
  - Total: 38,489 km^{2} (14,861 sq mi)

Population (2018)
  - Total: 969,783
  - Density: 25.196/km^{2} (65.258/sq mi)
- Demonym: Leonese (L(l)eonés/L(l)eonesa)

Language
  - Local languages: Spanish; Leonese; Galician

The Region of León (Leonese: Rexón de Llión; Spanish: Región de León), also known as the Leonese Country (Leonese: País Llionés; Spanish: País Leonés) is a historic territory defined by the 1833 Spanish administrative organisation. The Leonese region encompassed the provinces of Salamanca, Zamora, and León, now part of the modern Spanish autonomous community of Castile and León. As is the case with other historical regions, and continuing with centuries of history, the inhabitants of the Leonese region are still called Leonese. Even today, according with official autonomous government, the historical territorial adjective is used in addition with the modern annexed territory, the rest of Old Castile, being "Castilians and Leonese".

In 1983 the provincial government of León supported autonomy for the province of León, as did municipalities such as León and Ponferrada, the biggest cities in León, but this proposal was rejected by the Tribunal Constitucional (Constitutional Court of Spain). The idea of constituting the Leonese Region as an autonomous community within Spain has been promoted by a number of Spanish regional political parties such as Partido Regionalista del País Leonés, Grupo Autonómico Leonés, Unión del Pueblo Leonés and Unión del Pueblo Salmantino. This movement receives the name of Leonesism.

== Leonese history ==
Until 1833, the formerly independent Kingdom of León, situated in the northwest region of the Iberian Peninsula, retained the status of a kingdom although dynastic union had brought it into the Crown of Castile. The Kingdom of León was founded in 910 A.D. when the Christian princes of Asturias along the northern coast of the peninsula shifted their main seat from Oviedo to the city of León. The Atlantic provinces became the Kingdom of Portugal in 1139, and the eastern, inland part of the kingdom was joined dynastically to the Kingdom of Castile first in 1037–1065, again 1077–1109 and 1126–1157, 1230–1296 and from 1301 onward (see Castile and León § Historic union of the Kingdoms of Castile and León). León retained the status of a kingdom until 1833, being replaced by Adelantamientos Mayores, where the Leonese Adelantamiento consisted of the territories between the Picos de Europa and the Duero river.

=== Historical background ===
The Leonese lands show evidence of human occupation spanning the entire Palaeolithic. Lower Palaeolithic remains have been documented near Salamanca, while the Upper Palaeolithic and Epipaleolithic eras are well-represented by archaeological sites in the northern mountain regions, most notably Laciana, Valdeón, and the Cantabrian Mountains.

Megalithic remains in the Province of Zamora and in the Maragatería may be 5000 years old.

During the 1st millennium BC, Indo-European migrations transformed the region's cultural landscape. The Celts were the first major human group that came to the Leonese Region, arriving between 700 BC and 500 BC.

The Celtic tribes maintained a martial culture with a strong oral tradition and deep spiritual ties to the natural landscape. They mingled with the existing inhabitants of Leon, giving rise to a mixed culture. This Celtic origin is said to remain in certain cultural aspects today.

Their social leadership included military chiefs as well as druids or religious chiefs. The Celts' livelihood was based on fishing, farming, cattle-raising, and hunting. They lived in castros that were built in a circular form. Each family had a palloza and a little piece of land. They are thought to have worshipped their gods in the forests.

Celtic and pre-Celtic tribes that inhabited the Leonese region included:

- Astures
- Cantabri
- Gallaeci
- Vaccaei
- Vettones

=== Wars with Rome ===
To complete its conquest of Iberian Peninsula, Rome had to conquer the territories in the north that were still free. Galba's forces campaigned in the area, carrying out a massacre in Ocellum (Zamora) in 150 BCE. They fought against Viriathus, who won several battles against the Roman army by uniting Vettones and Lusitanians.

Viriathus was assassinated by Celtiberians paid by Rome. In this way, divisions among the Celts helped Rome to conquer all the territory. The Cantabri were the next people to lost its independence. Arreno, their leader, was crucified. Then Rome went north, conquering Lancia (this brought an end to the 20-year battle of the Esla).

=== Germanic invasions ===
The first Germanic invasions took place in the 5th century by:

- Suebi: From Central Europe, probably from Poland. They were very individualistic and they had a strong attachment to the land. They stayed a century and a half in the Leonese Region.
- Alans didn't come to the Leonese Region.
- Vandals were forced by Goths to migrate from Southern Poland to the South of Iberia. After that, they invaded almost all Iberian Peninsula but they were eventually thrown out of the Iberian Peninsula.
- Visigoths: They had the Code of Euric, the legal base of Leonese medieval laws.

=== Muslim conquest ===
When Moors arrived to the Iberian Peninsula, they defeated Don Rodrigo in the Battle of Guadalete.

Muza conquered Salamanca in 712. His forces met with no resistance; only the towns of Benavente and Veldeiras did they clash with opposition.

=== Kingdom of León ===
The Kingdom of León was an independent kingdom situated in the northwest region of the Iberian Peninsula. It was founded in 910 AD when the Christian princes of Asturias along the northern coast of the peninsula shifted their main seat from Oviedo to the city of León. The Atlantic provinces became the Kingdom of Portugal in 1139, and the eastern, inland part of the kingdom was joined to the Kingdom of Castile by 1230.

In 1188 the Kingdom of León developed the Cortes of León, one of the earliest Parliaments in Europe, and in 1202 asserted its fiscal authority for the first time.

=== Spain (1833-present) ===
==== Leonese Region (1833-1983) ====
A decree in November 1833, his secretary of state for Works, Javier de Burgos, created a centralized state, divided into 49 provinces. The provinces were named after their capitals (except four of them, who kept their former names: Navarra, capital Pamplona, Vitoria Álava, Guipúzcoa and Vizcaya in San Sebastian and Bilbao). The project is almost the same as in 1822, but without the provinces of Calatayud, Xàtiva, Bierzo and in addition, other provinces have changed their name to the change of capital.

The provinces are nominally ascribed to historical regions, which lacked any competition or common bodies grouped provinces, having a qualifier character, without pretensions of administrative operation. In the region of Leon are ascribed the provinces of León, Salamanca and Zamora. This reform implemented in 1833 has remained virtually unchanged (at provincial level) to the present.

In some periods of the 19th and 20th centuries, the region is ascribed to the provinces of León Palencia and Valladolid (from the Royal Decree of 30 November 1855). Valladolid and Palencia be ascribed to the region of Leon Franco until the early 1960s that are considered again in Old Castile.

==== Castile and Leon (1983-present) ====
In June 1978, Castilla and Leon won the autonomic system (the end of 1977 it had obtained Catalonia) by Royal Decree Law 20/1978 of 13 June.

In the time of the First Republic (1873–1874), the federal republicans conceived the project of creating a single federal state of eleven provinces in the Spanish Douro Valley, which also would have understood the provinces of Santander and Logroño. A few years earlier, in 1869, Republicans in the provinces that are part of the autonomous Federal Pact signed the Castilian, which already envisaged the creation of the federal state of Old Castile, but the provinces of Castile and the present community and the Cantabria and La Rioja. The End of the Republic, in early 1874, had blasted the initiative.

In 1921, marking the fourth centenary of the Battle of Villalar, the city of Santander advocated the creation of a pool of eleven provinces of Castile and León. This idea would be kept in later years.

In late 1931 and early 1932, from León, Eugenio Merino drafted a text which laid the foundations for a castellanoleonés regionalism. The text was published in the Diario de León.

During the Second Republic, especially in 1936, there was a big regional enabling activity to a region of eleven provinces, and even came to develop a basis for autonomous status. El Diario de Leon called for the formalization of this initiative and the establishment of an autonomous region with the words "unite in a personality to Leon and Old Castile around the great basin of the Duero, without falling now in simple village rivalries. Eventually the civil war ended with the aspirations of autonomy for the region.

After the death of Franco, emerged regional organizations, regional and national regionalism as castellanoleonés Regional Alliance of Castile and León (1975), Regional Institute of Castilla y Leon (1976) or Pancal (1977). Later after the end of the training began in 1993 regional unit of Castile and León.

Parallel other character emerged as the Autonomist Leonese Group (1978) or PREPAL (1980), who advocated the creation of an Autonomous Community of León, comprising the provinces of León, Salamanca and Zamora. The popular and political support he held in León province in autonomy became very important in that city. Following the entry into operation of autonomic castellanoleonés body, whose creation was facilitated by the Leon County Council of their agreement of 16 April 1980, the same institution Leon revoked on January 13, 1983, its original agreement, just as the draft Orgánca Law entered the Spanish parliament. The existence of contradictory agreements valid and what was resolved by the Constitutional Court in the Case 89/1984 of 28 September on the merits of law 5, which reads as follows:

In accordance with art. 143.2 of the Spanish Constitution, the common rule in the art and application in this case, "the initiative for the autonomy process corresponds to all the Provincial Councils concerned or with the corresponding inter-body and two-thirds of the municipalities whose population represents at least the majority of the electorate in each province or island. " This means very clearly attributed to the Provincial Government and the Municipalities, the latter in the amount shown above, the power to promote the establishment of the province or autonomous region to establish such a Community with other provinces also express a desire consistent. This is precisely what they did in April 1980 a sufficient majority of municipalities of Leon and the same county council.

and continues

However, such momentum that is necessary, unless exceptional scenario indicated "not mean to be continued in future and that, as contended by the appellants, the revocation of the agreement from the County, or sufficient number of municipalities, has to assume that the province concerned have to be considered excluded from the Autonomous Community in question. The Provincial Councils and drive a process, but do not have it, for the double reason that the impulse produced legitimately, are other subjects other processing assets and also the object of the activity that unfolds in this: according to the Art. An assembly of 146 members of the Provincial Councils of the affected provinces and by the Representatives and Senators elected in them, prepare a draft statute that will be elevated to Parliament for its enactment into law, the subject of process is not integrated and, as swing phase in its preliminary, the County Councils and Municipalities, but a new body that is born because it has already expressed a desire to express driving and now the whole territory, and this will already have a different object, the future legal regime of the territory it has expressed its desire to become autonomous community through acts of initiative that have already exhausted their effects. With the agreements adopted in this regard is therefore produces an impulse of the formation of the autonomous region, impulse without which it could not be constituted or might not cover missing in the province, unless the General Courts avail themselves of the power granted by Art. 144 C) of the Constitution.

To coincide with that ruling, Leon came in various forms, some numbers, in favor of Leon single option, which some sources brought together a number close to 90,000 attendees, this being the largest rally in the city Democracy until after March 11. In a resolution adopted on 31 July 1981, the Diputación Provincial de Segovia decides to exercise the initiative that Segovia could form autonomous province but in the municipalities of the province's status was matched between the supporters of autonomy one province or the rest Castilla y Leon. The City Council initially Cuellar joined this initiative autonomic resolution adopted by the corporation on 5 October 1981. Yet another resolution adopted by the same corporation, dated December 3, reversed the previous year and the process was halted pending the processing of an appeal by the county council against this agreement this change of City Council Cuellar tipped the balance in the province towards independence with the rest of Castile and León, but was an agreement reached late.

Finally Segovia province joins the region of Castile and León along with the other eight provinces and is given legal cover by the Organic Law 5 / 1983 for "reasons of national interest", as required by Article 144 c) Spanish Constitution for the provinces who have not exercised their right time.

== Geography ==
At present, León is composed of the provinces of León, Zamora, and Salamanca, is now part of the autonomous community of Castile and León within the modern Kingdom of Spain.

Political parties representing Leonesism, the Leonese regionalist and nationalist movements, support the creation of an autonomous community separate from Castile. Leonesist parties gained 13.6% of votes cast in the León autonomic elections in 2007. There have also been initiatives approved by some Leonese city councils to establish a NUTS-2 (European Statistical Region) for León.

Some nationalists have called for an independent country that would also encompass territories such as the Portuguese District of Braganza as well as others in Spain, like Valdeorras (Galicia) and other parts of the provinces of Cantabria and Castile.

=== Comarcas ===
==== Comarcas of the province of León ====
- Alfoz de León
- El Bierzo
- Comarca de La Cabrera
- Comarca de Luna
- Comarca de Sahagún
- Esla-Campos
- La Cepeda
- La Sobarriba
- La Tercia del Camino
- Laciana
- Maragatería
- Montaña Occidental
- Montaña Oriental
- Omaña
- Páramo Leonés
- Tierra de Astorga
- Tierra de Campos
- Tierra de León
- La Valdería

==== Comarcas of the province of Salamanca ====
- Campo de Salamanca
- Comarca de Ciudad Rodrigo
- Comarca de Guijuelo
- Comarca de Vitigudino
- La Armuña
- Las Villas
- Sierra de Béjar
- Sierra de Francia
- Tierra de Alba
- Tierra de Ledesma
- Tierra de Peñaranda

==== Comarcas of the province of Zamora ====
- Alfoz de Toro
- Aliste
- Benavente y Los Valles
- La Carballeda
- La Guareña
- Sanabria
- Sayago
- Tierra de Alba
- Tierra de Campos
- Tierra de Tábara
- Tierra del Pan
- Tierra del Vino

== Language ==
The Leonese language is recognised by the Statute of Autonomy of the present-day autonomous community of Castile and León. The Provincial Government of León signed accords with language associations to promote Leonese. Leonese is taught in sixteen schools of León city and to adults in Mansilla de las Mulas, La Bañeza, Valencia de Don Juan, and Ponferrada. The City Council of León promotes the language by publishing some of their announcements in Leonese.

Spanish is the dominant language spoken throughout the territory, while Galician is spoken in the occidental part of El Bierzo.

== Demographics ==
In January 2005 the population of the Leonese Region was distributed by provinces as follows: Leon, 497,387; Salamanca, 351,326; and Zamora, 197,237.

It is sparsely populated and demographically declining, especially in rural areas and even in small traditional towns. The demographic characteristics of the area show an aging population with a low birth rate and a mortality that approaches the national average.

Many of the people of the territory, who were devoted mainly to agriculture and livestock, were steadily abandoning the area, heading for urban areas, far better off. This situation was further aggravated by the end of civil war, with increasing rural migration. During the 1960s and 1980s, large urban centers and provincial capitals experienced a slight population increase due to an exhaustive process of urbanization, but despite this, the area continues to suffer severe Leon depopulation.

The phenomenon is also reflected in the number of municipalities with fewer than 100 inhabitants, which increased sevenfold between 1960 and 1986. Outside the provincial capital, notable for its population and cities such as San Andrés of Ponferrada in León, Rabanedo and Bejar in Salamanca.

There are two cities with over 100,000 inhabitants, namely Salamanca (pop. 159,754) and Leon (pop. 135,059).

== Economy ==
=== Primary sector ===
Fields of the Leonese Region are arid and dry but very fertile, they dominate in dry farming. Even so, irrigation has become increasingly important in areas of the valleys of the Douro, the Pisuerga and Tormes. The most fertile area coincides with the Leon Valley Esla, Leon, and Tierra de Campos, a region lying between Zamora, Valladolid, Palencia and León.

The major wine areas in the region are DOs Toro, D.O. Bierzo, D.O. Arribes D.O. Tierras de León. In the province of Leon also plant maize, hops and legumes.

Leonese Region has about 42,100 agricultural assets. By provinces, the agricultural working population in Leon working in about 18,300 people, about 9,200 in Salamanca and Zamora about 14,600 people.

Livestock accounts for a significant part of the final agricultural production.

Thus, small livestock farms tend to disappear, largely as a result of rural depopulation and loss of manpower. Nomadic pastoralism remains in some areas, large flocks, mainly of sheep, they travel hundreds of miles each year from the flat land to pasture land of mountains as in the Bierzo, Leon Cantabrian valleys. It is increasingly hard work with less manpower, having previously established a testimony of the first importance on the history and cultural roots of the town of Leon.

=== Secondary sector ===
The main industrial centers are: Leon (4521) and Ponferrada (4270). Other industries include textiles in Béjar, the sugar factory in Leon, Toro and Benavente, Leon and the pharmaceutical and steel metallurgy in Ponferrada.

In the Leonese Region, mining became important in Roman times, when it drew a road, route de la Plata, to transport the mined gold deposits in the marrow, in the Bierzo region of Leon, the route Asturica assumed Augusta (Astorga) to Emerita Augusta (Mérida) and Hispalis (Sevilla). Centuries later, after the Spanish civil war, mining was one of the factors contributing to economic development in the region. However, the production of iron, tin and tungsten declined dramatically since the 1970s, while the anthracite coal mines and were maintained by domestic demand of coal for power stations. The economic restructuring that affected mining areas Leon during the 1980s and 1990s led to the closure of numerous mines, social impoverishment, with a sharp increase in unemployment and the start of a new migration to other Spanish regions.

=== Tertiary sector ===
Throughout the 1990s increased the influx of tourists to the Leonese Region, driven mainly by the historical and cultural value of their cities and also by the natural beauty and landscape of its various regions. The World Heritage city of Salamanca and the road to Santiago which passes through the province of Leon are the great pillars of cultural tourism in the Leonese Region.

Domestic trade in the Leonese Region focuses on the food industry, automotive, fabric and footwear. For foreign trade, by region, are exported mainly manufactures steel bars and slate in Leon, Salamanca beef and meat goat and sheep, along with wine, Zamora.

== See also ==
- Kingdom of León
- Leonese people
- Leonese language
- Autonomous communities of Spain
- Nationalisms and regionalisms of Spain
- Province of Salamanca
- Province of Zamora
- Province of León
