= Javier de Burgos =

Spanish jurist, politician, journalist, and translator (1778–1848)

The Most Excellent Javier de Burgos
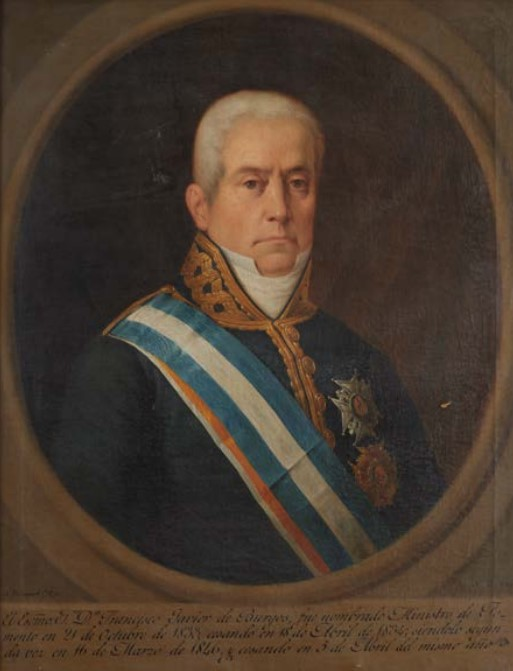
- Born: Francisco Javier de Burgos y del Olmo; 22 October 1778; Motril, Spain
- Died: 22 January 1848 (aged 69); Madrid, Spain

Seat R of the Real Academia Española
- In office 7 January 1830 – 22 January 1848
- Preceded by: José Miguel de Carvajal-Vargas
- Succeeded by: Juan Donoso Cortés

Francisco Javier de Burgos y del Olmo (22 October 1778—22 January 1848) was a Spanish jurist, politician, journalist, and translator.

== Early life and career ==
Born in Motril, into a noble but poor family, he was destined for a career in the Roman Catholic Church, but soon abandoned his studies in Granada and left for Madrid - where he took law courses. When the French invaded under Napoleon I, at the start of the Peninsular War (1808-1814), Burgos, as one of the afrancesados (supporters of King Joseph I), took up administrative duties in Andalusia. His willingness to collaborate had made him an enemy of the House of Bourbon, and made him leave for Paris in 1812.

In France, Burgos completed his academic training by studying the works of the Classics, and started translating the works of Horace into Castilian (a version notably analysed by Andrés Bello, who deemed Burgos "a poor translator, but an excellent commentator"). Much later (1844), Burgos published a revised version, which, although still flawed, has remained a reference - for instance, it is appreciated for its use of the sapphic stanza with free verse.

== Prominence ==
He returned to Madrid in 1819, and was appointed editor of El Imparcial in 1822 (the paper was a rallying point for moderate liberalism and the afrancesados). During the same period, Burgos showed himself to be a prolific author, writing a publishing a multiple volume work entitled Biografía universal. He was also integrated in the Bourbon administration of Ferdinand VII, being appointed undersecretary of State in Francisco Cea Bermúdez's Ministry. Under the regency of Maria Christina, as the driving force behind the 1833 territorial division of Spain, Burgos used his influence to turn Spain's previous administrative system into a provincial one, advocating for the need of a centralized government. However, his design overtly conflicted with the self-government status held by the Basque districts, especially with Navarre, heavily conditioned but still a free-standing Kingdom. The move was approved in November–December 1833, the same year he became Home Minister.

He was elected to seat R of the Real Academia Española, he took up his seat on 7 January 1830.

He was a senator of the Moderado liberals regime established during the reign of Isabella II, as well as a royal counsellor and Interior Minister for the first government of Ramón María Narváez y Campos, Duke of Valencia. His office as Minister was taken over by Narváez's successor, Francisco Javier Istúriz. He died in Madrid.

He also wrote poems marking events such as the death of María Isabel de Braganza and the wedding of Ferdinand VII and Maria Christina, as well as the notable Oda a la Razón.

== Bibliography ==
- Biografía universal (3 parts, 1823)
- Los tres iguales (1827)
- El baile de máscaras (1832)
- Oda á la razón
- El porvenir
- La primavera
- Historia del reinado de Isabel II (6 parts, 1850–51)
