= Susana Serrano-Gazteluurrutia =

Basque lawyer, legal scholar and professor of law (born 1969)

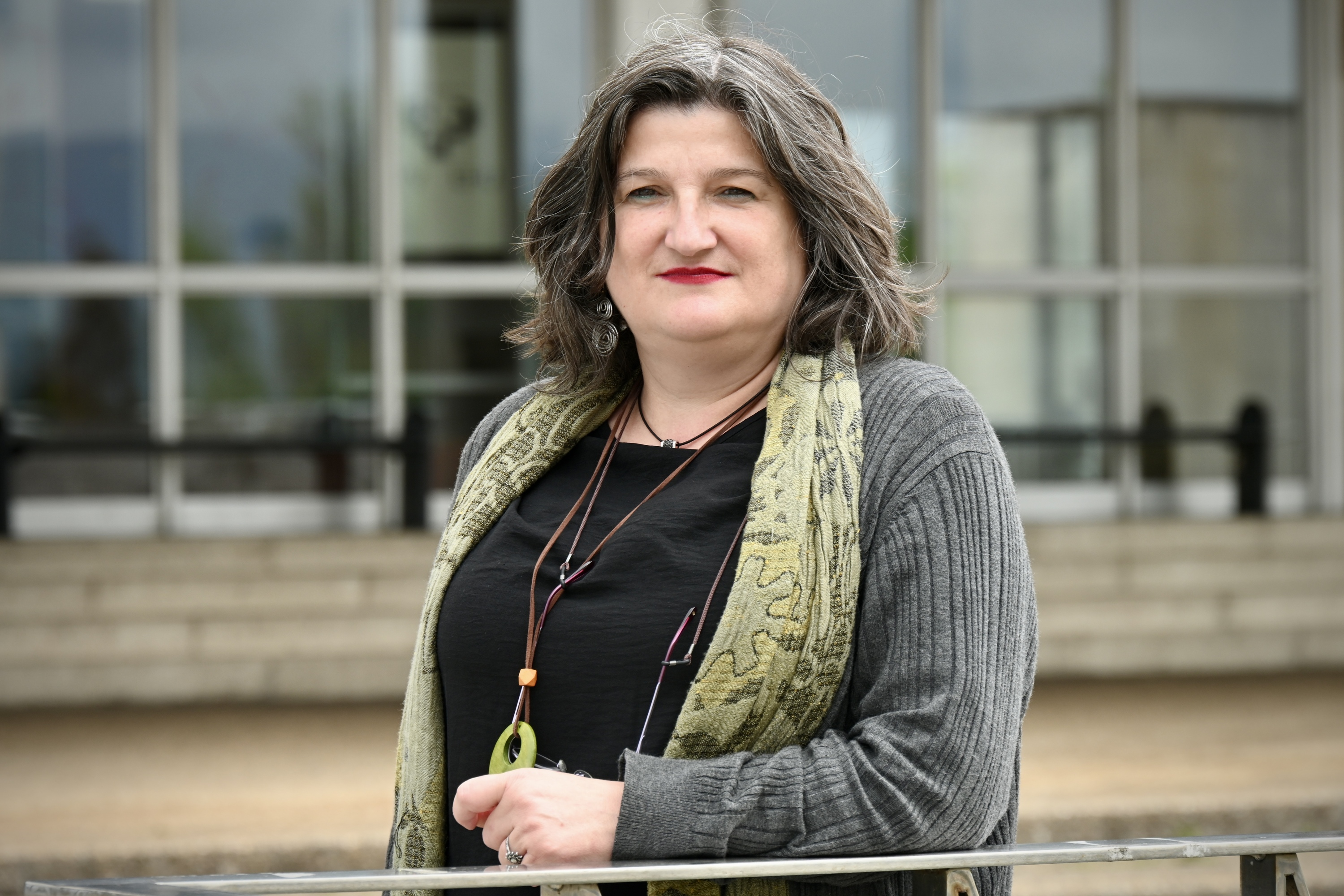
- Susana Serrano-Gazteluurrutia in 2025
- Born: Susana Serrano Gazteluurrutia; 19 May 1969 (age 57); Elorrio (Basque Country); Spain
- Education: University of Deusto (Lic.); University of the Basque Country (PhD)
- Occupations: Lawyer, legal scholar, professor and justice of the peace
- Mother: Maribel Gazteluurrutia Ezpeleta
- Awards: «Jesús María Leizaola» Award (2011)

Susana Serrano-Gazteluurrutia (born in Elorrio on 19 May 1969) is a Basque lawyer, legal scholar, professor of law and justice of the peace.

She is currently a professor of financial and tax law at the University of the Basque Country. She is an expert on the Basque and Navarre Economic Agreement systems, on Economic Agreement based financing systems, and on financing systems of chartered territories.

She is also a Justice of the Peace in Berriz (Basque Country).

== Biography and career ==
Susana Serrano-Gazteluurrutia was born in Elorrio (Basque Country) on 19 May 1969, born as the eldest of seven brothers and sisters. She studied a licenciate degree in law at the University of Deusto. She also obtained a postgraduate diploma in Basque Foral Civil Law and Basque Public Law, completing the postgraduate thesis with Javier Muguruza Arrese, former Director General of the Foral Treasury of Bizkaia. Later she obtained a doctorate in law at the University of the Basque Country in 2010, with the thesis "The Basque Economic Agreement before the EU courts: the judicialization of the Foral Tax Regulations in the European sphere. Current situation and future prospects.", directed by the Basque full professors Javier Caño Moreno (regional minister of the Basque Government) and Juan Ignacio Ugartemendía Eceizabarrena. She received the «Jesús María Leizaola» Award (2011), conferred by the Basque Government and the Basque Institute of Public Administration.

Since 2005, she has worked as a university teacher at the University of the Basque Country. As a university teacher, she has been responsible for and coordinated the subjects of Financial and Tax Law, as well as the tax legal practice course. She is currently a professor of Financial and Tax Law at the University of the Basque Country.

She is an expert in tax law, taxation, the general tax system, the Basque and Navarre Economic Agreement systems, and Economic Agreement based financing systems.

In 2016, Serrano-Gazteluurrutia was one of the six founders of the "Comunidad del Concierto-Gurea Kontzertua" platform ("Economic Agreement Community" or "Ours, the Agreement"), a platform in favor of the Basque and Navarre Economic Agreements, along with Pedro Luis Uriarte (regional minister of the Basque Government), Pilar Kaltzada, Guillermo Dorronsoro, Inés Anitua, and Jaime Balaguer.

Serrano-Gazteluurrutia also participates in conferences and public presentations about the Economic Agreement. Her outreach efforts regarding the Agreement have included appearances at the Cenarrusa Foundation for Basque Culture (Boise, Idaho, U.S.), in the Senate of Spain, and on radio and television.

In 2022, she was appointed Justice of the Peace of Berriz (Basque Country) by the High Court of Justice of the Basque Country. Previously she was Justice of the Peace of Elorrio (Basque Country).

== Personal life ==
She currently resides in Durango (Basque Country). She has three children.

== Publications ==
=== Books ===
- 2021, Towards the taxation of digital services: beyond state aid: Lilliputians vs. Gulliver: problematic aspects of digital taxation (reference to the Basque chartered tax authorities), Marcial Pons, Madrid.

=== Articles (selection) ===
- 2014, "Legitimate expectation of the recovery of state aid in the case of the "Basque tax holidays"", Revista Vasca de Administración Pública.
- 2012, "Conflicts over regional tax regulations. Problems arising from the difference between general and chartered financing of the Autonomous Communities", Eleria: Euskal Herriko legelarien aldizkaria.
- 2012, "Economic Agreement: a distinction that is not understood and the invisible ones it creates", Zergak: gaceta tributaria del País Vasco.
- 2011, "The impact of state aid on Basque cooperatives", Gizaekoa: Revista vasca de economía social.

== Awards and acknowledgements ==
- 2011, «Jesús María Leizaola» Award, conferred by the Basque Government and the IVAP.

== See also ==
- Basque tax holidays
- Basque Economic Agreement
