= Basque Economic Agreement =

Agreement between Spain and Basque Country

The Economic Agreement (Basque: kontzertu ekonomikoa, Spanish: Concierto económico) is a juridical instrument that regulates the taxation and financial relations between the General Administration of the Kingdom of Spain and the Autonomous Community of the Basque Country.

== History ==
=== First Stage: 1878–1937 ===
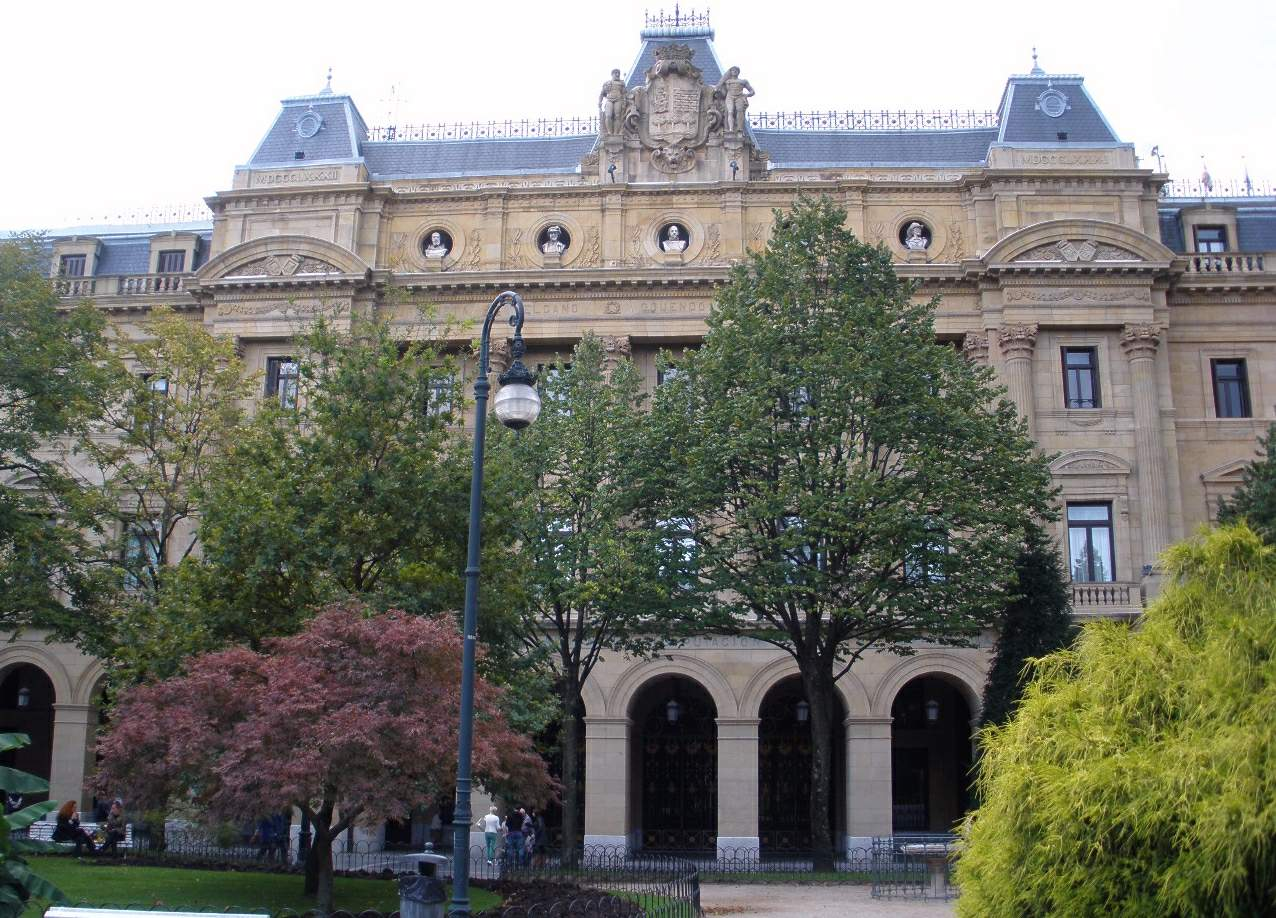
Chartered Council of Gipuzkoa in central San Sebastián (Gipuzkoako Foru Aldundia in Basque, 1887)

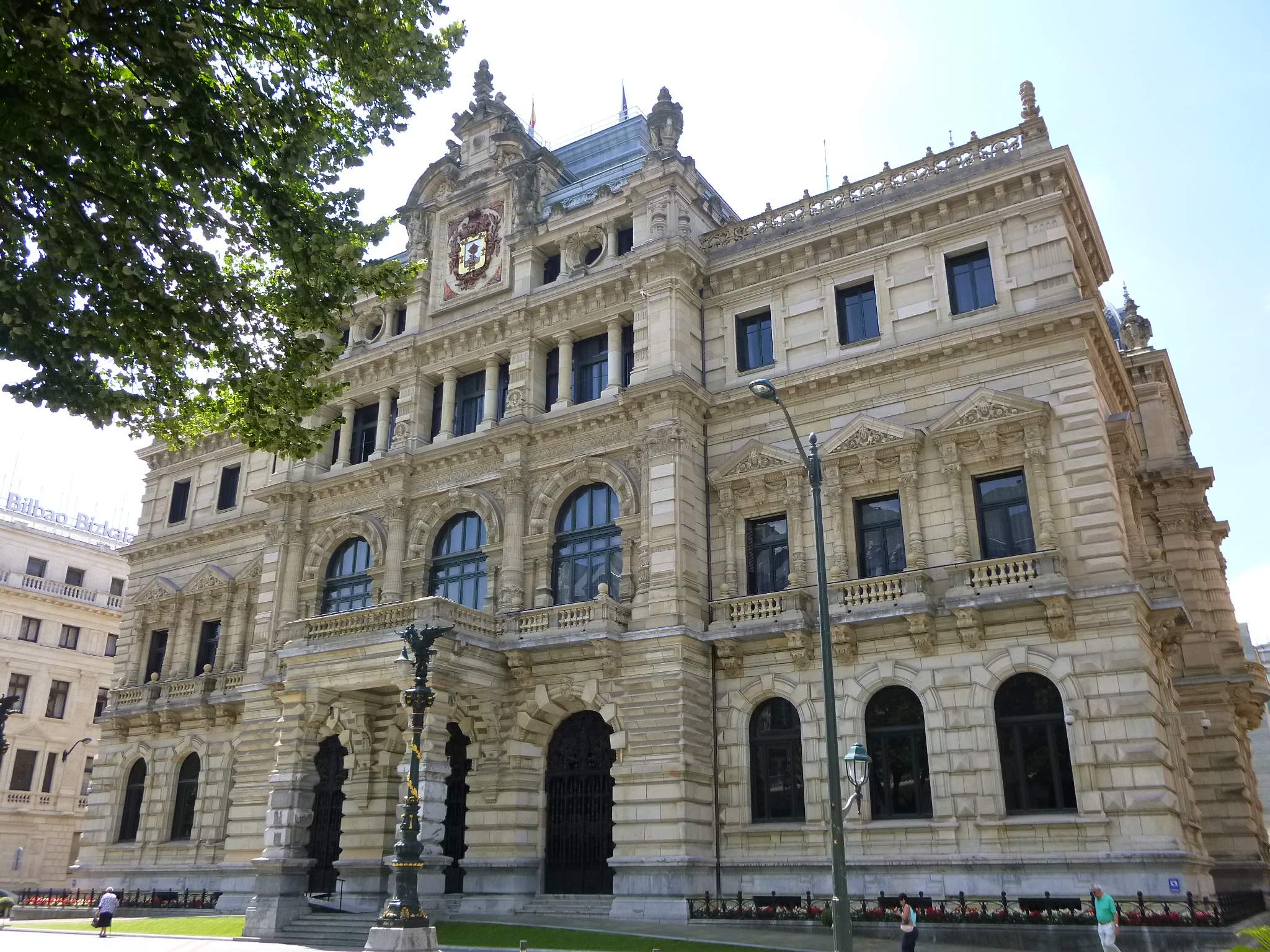
Chartered Council of Biscay (Bizkaiko Foru Aldundia), Bilbao

The origin of the Economic Agreement lay in the Third Carlist War defeat of 1876, with 40,000 Spanish troops occupying the Basque Provinces, and held under martial law. There was a need to reach an agreement of some type by which the Basque Provinces (Álava, Gipuzkoa and Biscay) would pay taxes to the State following the approval of the Law of July 21, 1876, which obliged the citizens of "these provinces to pay taxes according to their means, in the same way as other Spaniards," as put by the fueros abolition law pushed by the Spanish premier Canovas del Castillo.

The process of discussing this obligation was highly complex, due to these provinces having up to that point their own jurisdiction, territorial statutes, and their own bodies for political representation (the Juntas Generales or "Representative Assemblies"), which regulated their own internal tax systems, according to their Fueros (Charters). Following fruitless contacts between Antonio Cánovas del Castillo, President of the Government, and the representatives of the Chartered Councils (Diputaciones Forales - the specific Basque governments), the former dissolved the Juntas Generales (the assemblies) and the Chartered Council of Biscay. Between late November and early December 1877, he did the same with the Chartered Councils of Álava and Gipuzkoa.

However, the immediate problem was how to collect taxes in provinces where there had been only scarce activity by the State Treasury (since 1841 only the collection of Customs duties had been of any importance). This led to Antonio Cánovas to negotiate with the Government-appointed Provincial Councils over the form in which these provinces would enter the "Economic Agreement" of the Nation. Between December 1877 and February 1878 the representatives of the Provincial Councils and the Government attempted to reach an agreement. This took the form of a first Decree, dated February 28, 1878, by which the provinces would pay taxes to the State in a specific manner for a transitional period of eight years. The Provincial Councils were to be responsible for collecting the agreed taxes (impuestos concertados); they would then pay the State Treasury the equivalent of what the latter calculated it could collect, while employing for their own expenses the difference between the sum collected and the sum paid to the State Treasury through the Quota.

One important aspect was that the State would not be involved in the collection of the agreed taxes, leaving it to the Provincial Councils to decide whether or not to collect them. The Provincial Councils could collect those taxes, or continue employing their own tax system, which was essentially based on taxes on consumption (surcharges on the prices of food products, fuels, alcoholic drinks, etc.). This agreement, which should have ended in 1886 given its provisional character, has been renewed continually up until now. The most recent agreement was reached in 2017, after a 10-year-long gridlock.

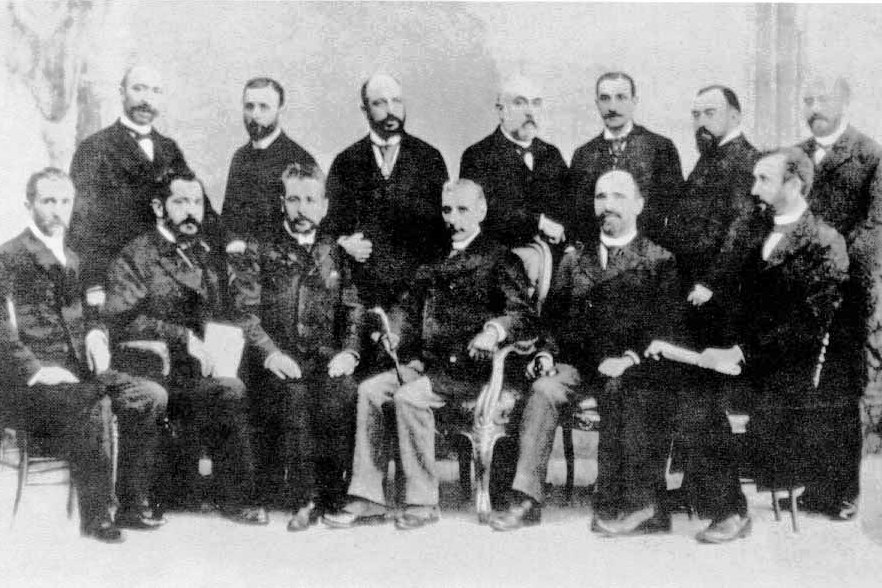
representatives of 3 Basque provinces when negotiating Concierto económico in Madrid, 1894

After the Decree of February 28, 1878, the Economic Agreement was renewed in 1886 since the Provincial Councils had promptly paid the Quota to the State Treasury without any problem; the Provincial Councils had kept many of the powers deriving from the earlier Fueros, and had their own means for tax collection. The Treasury Ministry did not collect the agreed taxes, but State investments in the Basque Country were very limited since the bulk of public investment was carried out by the Provincial Councils. The taxes that were initially agreed were the most important of those collected by the State Treasury, except for Customs duties: the five original taxes were the Territorial Tax, Industrial Tax, the Tax on Capital Transfer (Impuesto de Derechos Reales), Stamp Tax and Consumption Tax. Starting from these five original taxes, the number of taxes subjected to the agreement was extended in successive renewals, with the result that the sum to be paid to the State (the Quota) increased.

As the taxes subjected to the agreement were extended, and the economy of the provinces prospered - especially that of Biscay due to the strong development of mining, metalworking and ship building - the Quota increased:

Agreed Liquid Quota. 1878–1937
| Year | Biscay | Gipuzkoa | Álava | Total |
|---|---|---|---|---|
| 1878 | 857,8 | 655,8 | 529,6 | 2.043,2 |
| 1887 | 1.286,6 | 983,7 | 529,6 | 2.799,9 |
| 1894 | 2.557,0 | 1.446,1 | 597,7 | 4.600,8 |
| 1898 | 3.006,0 | 1.706,3 | 693,7 | 5.406,0 |
| 1899 | 2.617,0 | 1.486,3 | 602,7 | 4.706,0 |
| 1900 | 2.703,7 | 1.490,6 | 603,7 | 4.797,9 |
| 1904 | 2.553,1 | 1.373,9 | 548,1 | 4.475,1 |
| 1906 | 4.984,0 | 2.066,5 | 623,2 | 6.988,1 |
| 1913 | 4.388,4 | 2.066,5 | 623,2 | 7.078,1 |
| 1916 | 4.709,4 | 2.226,5 | 642,1 | 7.578,1 |
| 1920 | 6.999,4 | 2.411,5 | 667,1 | 10.078,1 |
| 1926 | 28.380,0 | 10.050,0 | 1.570,0 | 40.000,0 |
| 1932 | 28.734,0 | 10.177,0 | 1.589,0 | 40.500,0 |

Thousands of Pesetas.

These quantities were invariable between one agreement and the next. Hence the Provincial Councils were able to maintain their own tax system (within the agreed taxes and with a generic State authorisation); they could collect, or not collect, the taxes subject to the agreement, or even other taxes that had no equivalent in the rest of the country (such as the Hoja de Hermandad in Álava, or the tax on bars in Biscay). After paying the Quota to the Treasury Ministry, they could carry out their own policy of expenditure without prior permission from the Government. In short, they enjoyed a broad margin of administrative autonomy.

The system changed in 1937 in the cases of Biscay and Gipuzkoa. Following the fall of Bilbao to the Nationalist troops on June 19, 1937, and the end of the Civil War in the Basque Country, the military rebel Technical Board of Burgos (Junta Técnica de Burgos), by the Decree of June 23, 1937, abolished the Economic Agreement with Biscay and Gipuzkoa. The move was intended to further chastise the coastal Basque Provinces for their role in the defence of the Republican legality during the initial far-right military uprising (July 1937), in a way that they were branded "traitor" provinces. In contrast, the Economic Agreement remained in place in Álava, as well as in Navarre, the latter basing its Economic Agreement on the 1841 Compromise Act (Ley Paccionada).

=== Second Stage: 1937–1980. The Agreement in Álava ===
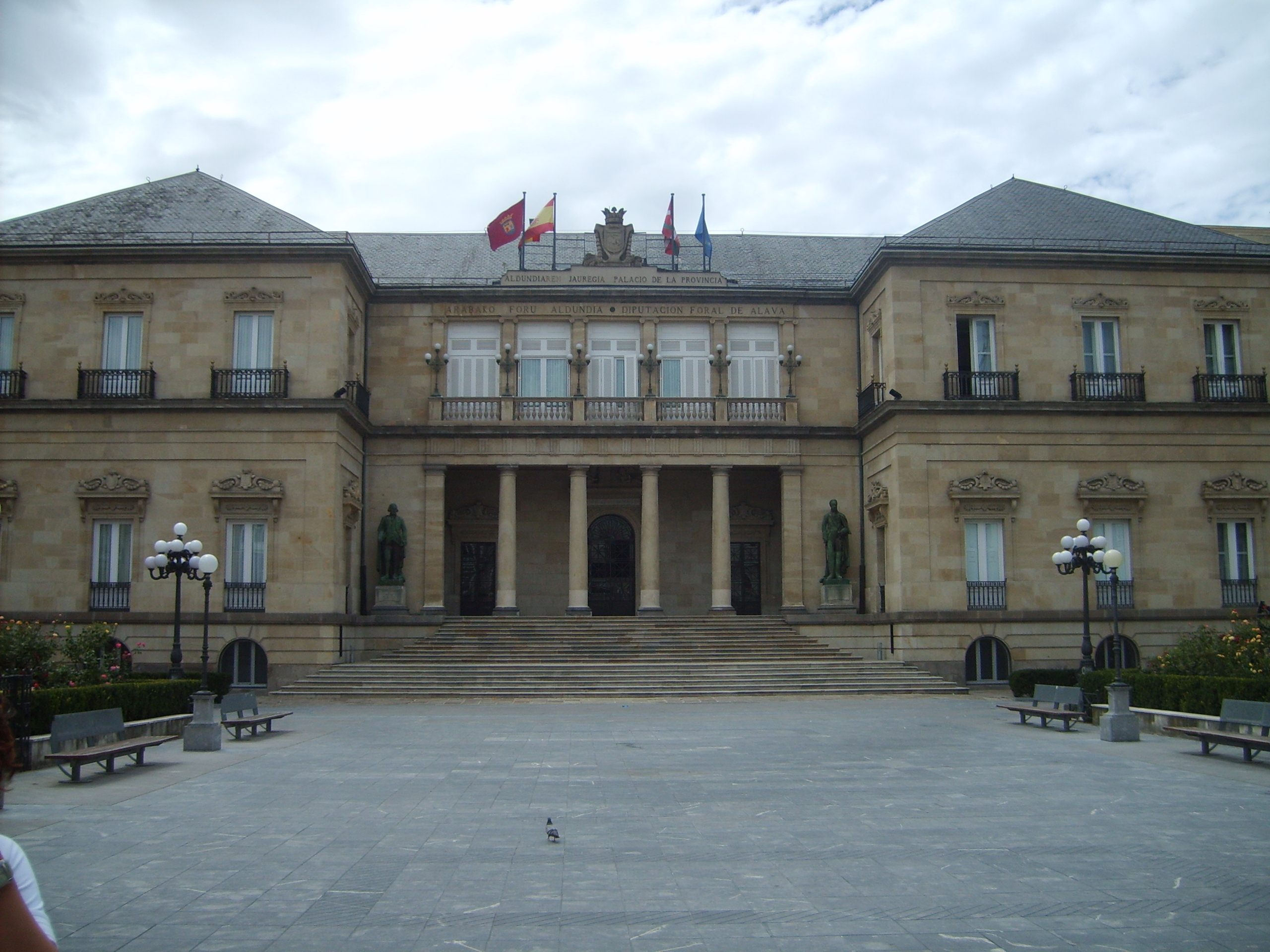
Chartered Council of Álava

Between 1937 and 1980 the system of the Economic Agreement only continued to be in effect in the province of Álava.

The renewals of the Agreement with Álava, as in the previous phase, responded to two main causes. The first was the expiry of the period of the agreement (the case in 1952 and 1976), and the second was the need to modify the agreement to adjust it to changes in State regulations (the case in 1940 and 1967).

By the Decree of May 9, 1942, the tax reforms of December 1940 and October 1941 were incorporated into the Agreement with Álava. In brief, the Agreement included the Tax on Luxury Consumption, the Tax on Use and Consumption (a revival of the taxes on consumption abolished in 1911) and the Exceptional Tax on extraordinary profits. Besides, the collection of Income Tax was transferred to the Provincial Council of Álava, although with the same regulation as in other Spanish territories.

In February 1952, with the completion of the previous period of 25 years, the Agreement was renewed for a further 25 years. As had been the case in the agreement of 1925, a five yearly increase was established so that the Quotas would not remain frozen. This revision would be carried out in equal proportion to the variation in budgeted State income for the year of reference. From 1967 onwards an annual revision was carried out.

The Royal Decree of November 26, 1976 approved another renewal of the Agreement with Álava, once again to be in effect for 25 years. However, the new period ushered in by the death of Franco and the beginning of the Transition resulted in a clear and radical change in the Agreement.

=== Third Stage: 1981–2009. The Present-day Agreement ===
Following the death of general Franco and the start of the Democratic Transition, the demands for Autonomy Statutes were revived in Catalonia and the Basque Country, and this process spread to the rest of the State.

The 1st Additional Regulation of the 1978 Constitution recognised and protected the Historical Rights of the Foral Territories. One of these historical rights was the Economic Agreement, which is why in the negotiation of the Autonomy Statute of the Basque Country the Agreement was extended once again to cover all of the Autonomous Community.

Indeed, Article 41.1 of the Autonomy Statute of the Basque Country of 1979 (Organic Law 3/1979 of December 18) states: “The relations of a tax character between the State and the Basque Country will be regulated through the traditional foral system of Economic Agreement or Contracts”. Article 41.2 establishes the foundations of its content, with the definition of the Quota as the most innovative aspect: “d) The contribution of the Basque Country to the State will consist in a global Quota, made up of those corresponding to each of the Territories, as a contribution to all of the costs of the State that are not assumed by the Autonomous Community”. That is to say, the conception of the Quota changed from the traditional conception of the hypothetical income of the Treasury, to payment of State expenditure on costs not assumed by the Autonomous Community.

On the basis of these principles, the negotiation of the Economic Agreement entered its definitive phase in the last months of 1980. A final agreement was reached on December 29, 1980, although for conjunctural reasons (the resignation of President Suárez, the attempted coup of February 23...) final approval had to wait until May 1981, when it was approved by a Single Article Law (Law 12/1981 of May 13 Official State Gazette (BOE)).

==== Basic Characteristics of the Economic Agreement of 1981 ====
The Economic Agreement was approved by a Single Article Law, which allowed for no amendment to its content that had been previously agreed upon between the parties; it could either be approved or not approved, but it could not be amended, following the pattern of international treaties. Thus, when mention is made of an article of the Law of the Agreement, it is understood that reference is being made to an article of the annex, and not to the Law which only has one article. The text of the Agreement of 1981 is divided into two fundamental parts: the section corresponding to taxes and the section corresponding to the Quota. This structure was derived logically from the prior existence of the Agreement with Álava. Article 1 of the text approved in 1981 established its duration, which was to be for 20 years. This 20-year period was not out of synchronisation, since it fitted in with the 25 years agreed with Álava in 1976, and thus maintained the traditional rhythm of 25-year periods established in 1925.

The content of the Law was distributed in two chapters, the first dedicated to general principles and the tax section itself, and the second dedicated to the Quota (the financial part). The first chapter contains the general regulations, the distribution of powers with the State and the regulation of agreed taxes.

Normative powers and the powers of exaction, management, liquidation and collection correspond to the Historical Territories, the Representative Assemblies (Juntas Generales) and the Provincial Councils respectively (article 2). Amongst the principles to be respected by the Basque tax system are found: solidarity, respect for the tax structure of the State, internal and external coordination with the State, tax harmonisation, respect for International Agreements and Treaties, and the interpretative criteria of the General Tax Law (articles 3 to 6).

The State reserves to itself Customs Duties, Tax Monopolies and the tax on alcohols, as well as issues relating to the income of non-residents and the tax system of businesses whose activities extend beyond the Basque territory or which are subjected to different tax legislation (article 6). The agreed taxes subjected to autonomous regulations, whose exaction corresponds to the Foral Treasuries, cover the main direct taxes and some indirect ones: Personal Income Tax (IRPF), the Extraordinary Wealth Tax, Corporation Tax (with autonomous regulations for companies operating exclusively in the Basque Country; State regulations are applied to those also operating outside the Basque Country, without detriment to the payment of taxes in the Basque Country due to the so-called “relative volume of business”), and the Inheritance and Gift Tax. Amongst the indirect taxes agreement was reached on the Capital Transfer Tax, Stamp Duty, the Tax on Company Traffic (Impuesto de Tráfico de Empresas) and the Luxury Tax, special taxes (telephones and refreshments) and taxes on gambling. Finally, the following were also recognised as taxes falling under autonomous regulation, in collaboration with the municipal treasuries: Rural and Urban Territorial Contribution, as well as the Tax Licence for Professional and Industrial Activities.

Chapter II deals with the regulation of the Quota. The principal difference between the Quota of 1878 and that of 1981 is that in the first case it was understood that the Quota was to be the equivalent of what the Treasury Ministry would have collected if it had applied the common system. However, from 1981 onwards, it is the payment corresponding to the expenditure that the central government continues making in the Basque Autonomous Community, whether directly for services situated here, or for others that benefit its inhabitants (for example the diplomatic service or the army), together with the contribution of the Autonomous Community to the Inter-territorial Compensation Fund. The part to be paid by the Autonomous Community is basically established according to its proportional weight within the national income.

To reach this figure a more general formula is employed that simplifies its calculation. The starting point is a basis that takes account of: State expenditure in Spain on untransferred powers; what the State collects due to income not included in the agreement; and, in order to avoid the quota representing an extra burden over and above the generation of effective resources of the State, the deficit. A proportion of this expenditure and income had to be assigned to the Basque Country. Through an approximate calculation, which takes account of the weight of the income and population within the Spanish total, it was stipulated that the proportion was 6.24%. The Quota has a five-yearly periodicity, although there is an annual adjustment of the quantity on the basis of the figures budgeted for and liquidated by the State. This is an essential difference from the design of the Quota up until that time, inasmuch as it involves the unilateral risk represented for the Basque Country of assuming a part of the expenditure on powers that have not been transferred and that depend exclusively on the State, independent of how the conjuncture of the country evolves or whether the tax collection increases or not.

Besides these agreements, it was also decided to set up Peer Commissions: one of these concerned the Quota and was responsible for an annual review of the Quota and a five-yearly review of the index of imputation (which has not altered since 1981); an Arbitration Board; and a Coordinating Commission (neither of which have ever met).

The evolution of the agreed Quotas has followed a logical course insofar as agreed taxes have increased and untransferred costs have fallen.

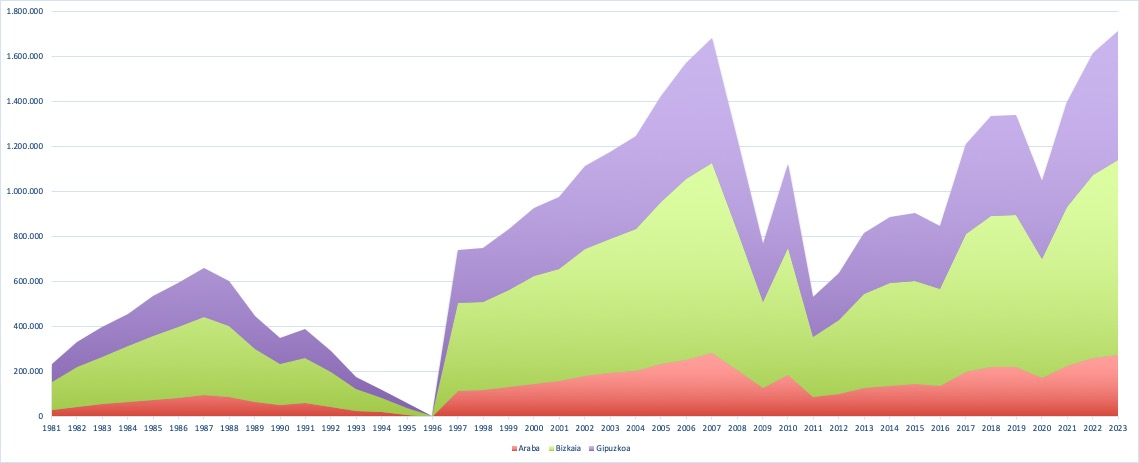
Liquid quotas of the Basque Country. 1981-2023(Thousands of Euros).

In fact, in 1996 the Quota fell to minimum levels and it was necessary to introduce a reform in the Economic Agreement to agree on new taxes (mineral oils, alcoholic drinks) in order to increase it.

As can be seen, the system of the Agreement has undergone certain changes in its content which, in general, have broadened it. However, due to this greater breadth, it has also encountered problems inherent in the development of the European framework, something that was unforeseeable to those who initially negotiated it. For this reason, the concrete application of the system by the Provincial Councils has recently been the subject of judicial arguments and lawsuits.

The changes in the Agreement of 1981 have been made insofar as reform became necessary to adapt it to new situations. By the Law of December 27, 1985, it had to be adapted to the introduction of VAT as a result of Spain's entry into the EEC. Then, through the Laws of June 2, 1990, December 27, 1990, and December 28, 1988, the initial law was adjusted to meet the rules regulating Local Treasuries, Municipal Taxes and Public Service Costs (precios públicos), resulting in the Updated Text of the Agreement of January 1, 1991. Other reforms took place: in 1993 in order to adapt the Agreement to the changes in VAT and Excise Duty; in 1997 concerning the methodology for determining the Quota for the 1997–2001 five-year period; and the final adaptation of August 4, 1997 incorporated other taxes on Mineral Oils and Tobacco (previously subjected to Tax Monopolies and thus not covered by the agreement) and the Personal Income Tax on non-resident citizens, and increased the normative autonomy in the case of direct taxes (IRPF and Corporations).

The Provincial Councils collect the greater part of the taxes, leaving aside municipal taxes, and have to finance the Basque Government. Their internal relations are regulated by the Law of Historical Territories (Ley de Territorios Históricos) (Law 27/1983 of November 25, concerning relations amongst the common institutions of the Autonomous Community and the Foral Organisations of its Historical Territories). In essence, this imitates the model of the Quota with the State since article 16 mentions that “the Historical Territories will contribute to the maintenance of all the general costs of the Basque Country that they have not assumed, to which end the Provincial Councils will make their contributions to the General Treasury of the Basque Country”. Article 20 establishes that the income derived from the management of the Economic Agreement, once the quota has been discounted, will be distributed amongst the General Treasury of the Basque Country and the Foral Treasuries, with the size of the contributions that the latter pay to the former set by the Basque Finances Council, formed by six members (three from the Basque Government and one from each Provincial Council). Different Laws of Contribution have resulted from these meetings, the most recent of which is Law 2/2007; official Bulletin of the Basque Country (BOPV) no. 70, of April12th and BOPV no. 80, of April 26.

==== The Renewal of the Economic Agreement of 2002 and the Reform of 2007 ====
Following a complex negotiating process, which began in the summer of 2001, and after a unilateral extension by the State by the Law of December 27, 2001, given that there was no agreement in the Mixed Commission on the Quota at the appropriate time, an agreement was reached in this Commission on March 6, 2002, that took concrete form in Law 12/2002 of May 23. This Law, which also consists of a single article, introduced relevant innovations with respect to earlier texts. In the exposition of reasons for enacting the new law, emphasis was placed on the Agreement's character as historical law, with a widening of foral normative authority, and on the need to regulate the financial flows between the State and the Autonomous Community. But, above all, the most important element was unquestionably its stating that the Agreement had an indefinite character. It had previously been of indefinite duration in 1886, but periods of expiry had been set that had given rise to friction in the months prior to the renewals. Thus the agreement is of indefinite duration although it has mechanisms of modification by common agreement on the Mixed Commission on the Economic Agreement (previously the Quota). This argument had been one of the points on which the Provincial Councils had held a firm position from the beginning of the system, since in their understanding it was the contingent element (the agreed taxes and the Quota) that was variable but not the agreement itself.

In this agreement of 2002 there was a reduction in the taxation powers of the State (importation rights or importation duties relating to Excise Duty and VAT), while reserving to itself the High Inspection (a concept that has never been clarified) in the application of the Agreement (article 5). Another more structural novelty of the Agreement itself is that while in 1981 it contained two parts, taxes and the Quota, it now has three differentiated parts: taxes, financial relations (not only the Quota) and another new part concerning the Commissions and the Arbitration Board.

In the first part on taxes (articles 1 to 47), after setting out some general regulations, it then details the applicable regulation for each tax and the sum exacted in each of them: Personal Income Tax (IRPF), Corporations, Personal Income of Non-residents, Wealth, Inheritance and Gift Tax, VAT, Capital Transfer Tax and Stamp Duty, Tax on Insurance Premiums, Excise Duty, Excise Duty on the Retail Sale of Certain Mineral Oils, Gambling Duties and Fees. The municipal taxes are also considered to be regulated by the Historical Territories (Property, Real Estate, Tax Licences (Impuesto de Actividad Económica), Mechanical traction...).

The second chapter deals with Financial Relations on the basis of some general principles: the fiscal and financial autonomy of the institutions of the Basque Country and respect for solidarity in the terms envisaged in the Constitution and the Autonomy Statute; coordination and collaboration with the State on questions of budget stability and the assignment of the financial tutelage of the Municipal Councils to the Institutions of the Basque Country without their having any less autonomy than the municipal councils of the rest of the State. The basis of the Quota is maintained: a global Quota as a contribution to all the costs of the State that are not assumed by the Autonomous Community of the Basque Country, fixed for five years with annual updating.

The third chapter details the commissions that come into play in the Agreement. There is the Mixed Commission of the Economic Agreement, with parity between the Basque side (one representative for each Provincial Council and three for the Basque Government) and the State, with decisions taken by unanimity. This Commission agrees on the modifications to be made to the Agreement and the methodology of the Quota every five years. In addition to this commission there is the Coordination and Evaluation Commission, formed by eight members (half from the Basque Country - one representative for each Provincial Council and another for the Basque Government – and half from the State) which is responsible for adjusting the tax regulations prior to their publication. Finally, an Arbitration Board is formed, made up of three members appointed by the Treasury Minister and the Basque Treasury Councillor. This Board is made up of experts with recognised prestige, appointed for six years, responsible for resolving any conflicts between the State and Basque Administrations.

After the first five years of its being in effect, it was reformed subject to the agreement of July 2007 and approved by Law 28/2007 of October25th, which modified Law 12/2002 of May 23, which approved the Economic Agreement with the Autonomous Community of the Basque Country (see Official State Gazette (BOE)). Besides renewing the Five-yearly Law of the Quota, the Basque and Spanish Administrations agreed on a formula for responding to the tax requirements of the European Commission, the Economic Agreement was adapted with respect to budget stability, and there was agreement on the composition of the Arbitration Board envisaged in the Agreement, which had not been set up until then.

=== Modification of the Economic Agreement and new Five-Year Quota Law of 2017 ===
In the spring of 2017, due to the parliamentary minority of the Popular Party, parliamentary support for the General State Budget for that year was agreed with, among other parties, the Basque Nationalist Party. Among other agreements, there were several reforms in the Economic Agreement and, above all, the approval of a new Quota Law, since ten years had passed since 2007 and another one should have been approved for the five-year period 2012–2017.

Thus, after the corresponding parliamentary procedure, the Economic Agreement was modified by Law 10/2017, of December 28. Since the modification carried out in 2014, other novelties had been introduced in the tax system which made it necessary to adapt the Agreement, as required by its second additional provision.

Therefore, in the first place, the Agreement has been adapted to several legislative changes that have taken place in the State legislation and that were pending its incorporation to the Agreement. It has been agreed to update, among others, the precepts relating to tax groups, the Electricity Tax, the option for non-residents to pay personal income tax, as well as the adaptation of the regulation of the tax crime in accordance with the new regime established in the Penal Code.

Likewise, it has been approved the arrangement of the Tax on the value of the extraction of gas, oil and condensates, created by Law 8/2015, of May 21, amending Law 34/1998, of October 7, of the Hydrocarbons Sector, and regulating certain tax and non-tax measures in relation to the exploration, research and exploitation of hydrocarbons. In relation to the Inheritance and Gift Tax, the Provincial Councils are assigned the responsibility of levying the tax due on acquisitions made by taxpayers resident abroad when most of the total value of the assets and rights transferred corresponds to those located in the Basque Country, as well as in the inheritance of deceased persons not resident in Spanish territory when the heir resides in the Basque Country and in donations to residents in the Basque Country of real estate located abroad.

With respect to the taxation of Tax Groups, it is established that the proportion of the group's volume of operations must be taken into account for withholding tax purposes in the cases referred to in the second paragraph of letter c) of article 7.One, the second paragraph of letter a) of article 9.One and the second paragraph of article 23.Two of the Tax Agreement. On the other hand, improvements have been introduced in tax management and coordination between Administrations by establishing, among other measures, a new procedure for the regularization of VAT refunded installments corresponding to liquidation periods prior to the moment in which the taxpayer's operations began to be carried out, agreeing on the rules for the assignment and revocation of the Taxpayer Identification Number, regulating the collaboration between Administrations in relation to the actions of verification and investigation and of obtaining information in order to levy taxes and introducing new rules for the coordination of tax collection and inspection competences between Administrations in cases of regularization of transactions between related persons or entities and the classification of transactions differently from the way they have been declared by the taxpayer when this implies a modification of the taxes borne or charged in indirect taxes in which the charging mechanism has been established. Likewise, it has been agreed to modify the precepts regulating the connection points in various taxes: Personal Income Tax, Corporate Income Tax, VAT and Non-Resident Income Tax.

However, the 2017 reform did not address the problem of import VAT discrimination suffered by importing companies in the Basque Country since 2015. Since that year, it has been allowed throughout Spain (except in the Basque Country and Navarre) that importers of a certain volume do not have to advance import VAT before Customs and settle it later within their ordinary VAT liquidation, which implies offsetting it directly against their output VAT. In this way, the financial problem of the advance payment of import VAT disappeared in the rest of Spain. Since 2015, an extension of this benefit to Basque importers has been demanded, by means of a negotiation between the Basque and the State Administrations, which either modifies the text of the Agreement that still establishes that the levying of VAT on imports is a State competence or reforms the mechanisms of liquidation and compensation between administrations of said VAT that allow the liquidation before the Regional Treasuries in the case of importers of a certain volume. Such opportunity was lost in the important negotiation of 2017. In 2021 the problem persists and given that in that year a new reform of the Agreement has to take place, to include the two new taxes on Digital Services and Financial Transactions, the moment should be used to eliminate this important discrimination affecting Basque importers. At the same time, a new Quota Law had to be agreed for the five-year period 2017–2021,2 in addition to liquidating the quotas from 2007 -the year of the last approved Quota Law- until 2017. Thus, the quota for the base year, 2017, was established as follows:

| Item | Thousands of euros |
|---|---|
| STATE BUDGET. EXPENSES | 276,152,254.24 |
| EXPENSES ASSUMED BY THE A.C.V.C | 89,966,505.13 |
| TOTAL EXPENSES NOT ASSUMED | 186,185,749.11 |
| IMPUTATION OF THE INDEX (6.24%) | 11,617,990.74 |
| COMPENSATIONS AND ADJUSTMENTS | -10,313,455.24 |
| For non-concerted taxes -539,702.10 | -539,702.10 |
| For Non-Tax Revenues | -595,209.88 |
| For Budget Deficit | -8,781,465.54 |
| Direct Taxes. Direct Concerted Taxes | -397.077,72 |
| LIQUID QUOTA | 1,304,535.50 |
| Compensations Álava | -4,426.53 |
| LIQUID PAYABLE | 1,300,108.97 |

Note: The provisional valuation of the cost associated with the public programs and actions in the field of labor, employment and vocational training transferred to the Basque Country by Royal Decree 1441/2010, of November 5 (Section G.2) is not included in this amount as an Assumed Charge.

=== Modification of the Economic Agreement and the new Five-Year Quota Law of 2023 ===
Once Pedro Sanchez, leader of the PSOE, came to the Government, a new parliamentary majority had to be organized since 1918. And for this, as happened with the Popular Party in 2017, the Economic Agreement was modified by incorporating new taxes and a new Five-Year Quota Law was approved. The negotiating process was relatively lengthy (although it must be taken into account that the COVID-19 crisis was in the middle). In 2022 there was a first modification of the Agreement, by means of Law 1/2022, of February 8, with the aim of adapting it, on the one hand, to the reform of the Value Added Tax carried out to transpose the Community Directives that modified this tax with the aim of modernizing and simplifying the taxation of cross-border e-commerce and, on the other hand, to incorporate to the Agreement the new tax figures created with the approval of Law 5/2020, of October 15, on the Tax on Financial Transactions (Tobin Tax) and Law 4/2020, of October 15, on the Tax on Certain Digital Services (Google Tax).

However, new tax modifications made further changes necessary, already embodied in 2023.

The reform texts were published on April 4, 2023, by means of the laws modifying the Economic Agreement (Law 9/2023, of April 3) and approving the methodology of the quota to be paid to the State applicable to the period 2022 to 2026 (Law 10/2023, of April 3). The first one incorporated the establishment of two new taxes (the Special Tax on Non-Reusable Plastic Containers and the Tax on the Deposit of Waste in Landfills, Incineration and Co-incineration of Waste) and adapts the connection point applicable to the Tax on Fluorinated Greenhouse Gases, following the modification of its structure operated in the State tax regulation. Also included was the new tax figure, complementary to the Wealth Tax, of the temporary Solidarity Tax of the Great Fortunes, with reference to the connection points already stablished for the latter tax.

The new Quota Law (Law 10/2023, of April 3), proceeded to determine the methodology for setting the quota during the five-year period 2022–2026, as well as to establish the provisional liquid quota for the year 2022, the base year of the five-year period. Although the approved methodology is markedly similar to that contained in the previous five-year period, some novelties are introduced in relation to the adaptation of the VAT consumption adjustment methodology, that of the Special Tax on Non-Reusable Plastic Containers and that of the Tax on Fluorinated Greenhouse Gases. Thus, Annex I of this last provision published the quota for that base year, 2022.

| Item | Thousands of euros |
|---|---|
| STATE BUDGET. EXPENSES | 347,486,096.54 |
| EXPENSES ASSUMED BY THE A.C.V.C | 114,775,397.82 |
| TOTAL EXPENSES NOT ASSUMED | 232,710,698.72 |
| IMPUTATION OF THE INDEX (6.24%) | 14,521,147.60 |
| COMPENSATIONS AND ADJUSTMENTS | -13,048,983.92 |
| For non-concerted taxes | -746,921.43 |
| For Non-Tax Revenues | -2,654,165.64 |
| For Budget Deficit | -9,361,627.50 |
| Direct Taxes. Direct Concerted Taxes | -286,269.35 |
| LIQUID QUOTA | 1,472,163.68 |
| Compensations Álava | -4,426.53 |
| LIQUID PAYABLE | 1,467,737.15 |

(*) This amount does not include the provisional valuation of the cost associated with the public programs and actions in the field of labor, such as employment and vocational training transferred to the Basque Country by Royal Decree 1441/2010, of November 5 (Section G.2).

== See also ==
- Basque Country (autonomous community)
- Basque Government
- Basque Statute of Autonomy

== Sources ==
- Alonso Olea, Eduardo J. (1995). El Concierto Económico (1878–1937). Orígenes y formación de un "Derecho Histórico". Oñati, IVAP. ISBN 84-7777-136-7.
- Muguruza Arrese, Javier (2006). Recopilación del Concierto Económico Vasco. Legislación, jurisprudencia y bibliografía. Ad Concordiam, Bilbao. ISBN 84-611-0147-2.
- Uriarte, Jose Luis. "El Concierto Económico; Una Visión Personal". El Concierto Económico. Publitas.

== See also ==
Basque tax holidays
