= Basque tax holidays =

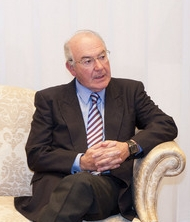
Lehendakari José Antonio Ardanza

The Basque tax holidays were economic policies aimed at attracting foreign investment to the Basque Country, in Spain, implemented during the 1993–1994 period by the Basque Government of Lehendakari José Antonio Ardanza, the policy benefited companies that would settle in this autonomous community.

The policy included a gradual 10-year reduction in the corporate tax base and a 45% tax credit on new investments in excess of 15,025,303 euros in new tangible fixed assets to any company with a share capital of 120,000 euros or a minimum of 10 workers (in practice it affected almost any SME). All these benefits were issued by the three Basque Treasuries (Hacienda de Guipúzcoa, Hacienda de Vizcaya and the Hacienda de Álava). Some 300 companies benefited.

Both the autonomous community of La Rioja and Cantabria, lacking an economic agreement to counter these measures, considered that these benefits significantly damaged the companies established in territories bordering the Basque Country and encouraged corporate relocation, the measures were denounced as unfair competition.

In 2000 the European Union declared these measures to be illegal according to Community Treaty. In 2006 the Court of Justice of the European Union sided with the European Commission and asked the government of Spain to revert any benefit on December 14, 2006, considering them as "state aid incompatible with the common market".

In 2011, Joaquín Almunia, competition commissioner of the European Union demanded the Basque Government to revert these benefits and; ultimately, to the beneficiary companies to do so.
