= Café para todos =

Concept in Spanish politics

"Café para todos" (coffee for all, or coffee for everyone) is a popular expression in Spain that has the sense of offering the same treatment to all parties involved in an issue in order to please (or displease) everyone equally. It was pronounced for the first time by Manuel Clavero Arévalo, minister between 1977 and 1980, that is, during the Spanish transition to democracy. At this time Spain was going from dictatorship to democracy and one of the great debates about the formation of the new nation was whether to form a centralist or federalist government, since certain regions demanded greater autonomy. The supposedly "neutral" solution was to offer autonomy to all regions.

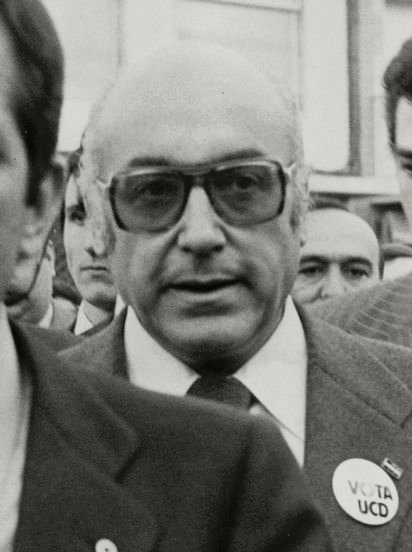
Don Manuel Clavero

The configuration of the Spanish territory was inspired by the systems of Germany and Italy. Manuel Clavero was Minister of Regions during the first democratic government of Adolfo Suárez, and in his hand was the design of the new national map. The regions could choose between a full or a limited level of autonomy, but they all have self-government. The expression café para todos has been fixed as a figuration of the current territorial model of Spain.

Café para todos also became a doctrine with the object to harmonise the autonomy model across Spain while simultaneously reinforcing the primacy of the central government and dilute claims of ethno-territorial distinctiveness from the historic nationalities. In particular, the Harmonisation of the Autonomy Process Act (LOAPA) in 1982 not only extended powers to the other communities to achieve similar powers as the historic nationalities, but showed an intention to reverse already devolved powers.

== See also ==
- First government of Adolfo Suárez
- Nationalities and regions of Spain

== Bibliography ==
- Anderson, Paul (2020). "Decentralisation at a crossroads: Spain, Catalonia and the Territorial Crisis" (PDF). Ethnopolitics. 19 (4). London: Routledge: 342–355. doi:10.1080/17449057.2020.1795470. ISSN 1744-9065. OCLC 300873767.
