= Autonomous communities of Spain =

First-level administrative divisions of Spain

Autonomous community Spanish: comunidad autónoma (Note: Spanish pronunciation: [komuniˈðað awˈtonoma]) Aragonese: comunidat autonoma Asturian: comunidá autónoma Basque: autonomia erkidegoa (Note: Basque pronunciation: [autonomi.a erkiðeɣo]) Catalan: comunitat autònoma (Note: Catalan pronunciation: [kumuniˈtat əwˈtɔnumə], Valencian pronunciation: [komuniˈtat awˈtɔnoma]) Galician: comunidade autónoma (Note: Galician pronunciation: [komuniˈðaðɪ awˈtɔnʊmɐ]) Occitan: comunautat autonòma (Note: Occitan pronunciation: [kumynawˈtat awtuˈnɔmo], [kumynawˈta awtuˈnɔmo])
- Category: Autonomous administrative division
- Location: Kingdom of Spain
- Created by: Spanish Constitution of 1978
- Created: 1979–1983
- Number: 17 autonomous communities 2 autonomous cities
- Populations: Autonomous communities: 324,184 (La Rioja) – 8,631,862 (Andalusia); Autonomous cities: 83,179 (Ceuta) – 85,985 (Melilla)
- Areas: Autonomous communities: 4,992 km^{2} (Balearic Islands) – 94,223 km^{2} (Castile and León); Autonomous cities: 12.3 km^{2} (Melilla) – 18.5 km^{2} (Ceuta)
- Government: Autonomous governments; National government
- Subdivisions: Provinces; Comarcas; Municipalities

The autonomous communities (Spanish: comunidades autónomas, singular: comunidad autónoma) are the first-level administrative divisions of Spain, created in accordance with the Spanish Constitution of 1978, with the aim of guaranteeing limited autonomy to the nationalities and regions that make up Spain.

There are 17 autonomous communities and two autonomous cities (Ceuta and Melilla) that are collectively known as "autonomies". (Note: "Autonomies" (in Spanish: autonomías, in Basque: autonomien, in Catalan/Valencian: autonomies, in Galician: autonomías).) The two autonomous cities have the right to become autonomous communities.

The autonomous communities exercise their right to self-government within the limits set forth in the constitution and organic laws known as Statutes of Autonomy, (Note: "Statutes of Autonomy" (in Spanish: Estatutos de Autonomía, in Basque: Autonomia Estatutuen, in Catalan/Valencian: Estatuts d'Autonomia, in Galician: Estatutos de Autonomía).) which broadly define the powers that they assume.

Each statute sets out the devolved powers (Spanish: competencias transferidas) for each community; typically those communities with stronger local nationalism have more powers, and this type of devolution has been called asymmetrical which is on the whole seen as advantageous, able to respond to diversity.

Despite the Constitution not setting a mandatory legislative chamber framework, all autonomous communities have chosen unicameralism. All such governments have legislative and executive branches of government but not judicial.

== Decentralisation model ==
The Spanish model is generally considered by foreign political scientists and scholars as "a federal system with certain peculiarities". However it is also described as a decentralised unitary country. While sovereignty is vested in the nation as a whole, represented in the central institutions of government, the nation has, to varying degrees, devolved power to the communities.

This unique framework of territorial administration has been labeled by the Constitutional Court as the "State of Autonomous Communities", (Note: "State of Autonomies" (in Spanish: Estado de las Autonomías, in Basque: Autonomien Estatuaren, in Catalan/Valencian: Estat de les Autonomies, in Galician: Estado das Autonomías). Also known as "Autonomous State" (in Spanish: Estado Autonómico, in Basque: Autonomia Estatuko, or Estatuaren, in Catalan/Valencian: Estat Autonòmic, in Galician: Estado Autonómico)) to avoid implying either a unitary or federal model. Some scholars have referred to the resulting system as a federal system in all but name, or a "federation without federalism".

== List of autonomous communities ==
Most autonomous communities are officially referred to by either their Spanish name (which is the case for the majority of them) or the name in the community's co-official language (as in the Valencian Community and the Balearic Islands). In the Basque Country, Navarre and Galicia, both forms are used. Since 2006, the Aranese standard of Occitan is also a co-official language in Catalonia, making it the only autonomous community whose name has three official variants (Spanish: Cataluña, Catalan: Catalunya, Occitan: Catalonha).

Flag	Autonomous community	Capital	President	Legislature	Government coalition	Seats in Parliament		Area (km^{2})	Pop. (2024)	Density (/km^{2})	GRP per capita (€; 2023)	Status
Flag	Autonomous community	Capital	President	Legislature	Government coalition	Senate	Congress (2026)	Area (km^{2})	Pop. (2024)	Density (/km^{2})	GRP per capita (€; 2023)	Status
	Andalusia; Andalucía	Seville	Juan Manuel Moreno (PP)	Parliament	PP and Vox	41 (9 RA, 32 DE)	60	87,268 (17.2%)	8,631,862	96	23,218	Nationality
	Aragon; Aragón; Aragó	Zaragoza	Jorge Azcón (PP)	Cortes	PP and Vox	14 (2 RA, 12 DE)	13	47,719 (9.4%)	1,351,591	28	34,658	Nationality
	Asturias; Principado de Asturias	Oviedo	Adrián Barbón (PSOE)	General Junta	FSA–PSOE, CxAst	6 (2 RA, 4 DE)	7	10,604 (2.1%)	1,009,599	96	28,130	Historical community
	Balearic Islands; Islas Baleares; Illes Balears	Palma	Marga Prohens (PP)	Parliament	PP	7 (2 RA, 5 DE)	8	4,992 (1%)	1,231,768	230	34,381	Nationality
	Basque Country; País Vasco; Euskadi	Vitoria-Gasteiz (de facto)	Imanol Pradales (PNV)	Parliament	PNV, PSE-EE (PSOE)	15 (3 RA, 12 DE)	18	7,234 (1.4%)	2,227,684	305	39,547	Nationality
	Canary Islands; Islas Canarias	Las Palmas, Santa Cruz	Fernando Clavijo Batlle (CC)	Parliament	CCa, PP, ASG, AHI	14 (3 RA, 11 DE)	15	7,447 (1.5%)	2,238,754	289	24,345	Nationality
	Cantabria; Cantabria	Santander	María José Sáenz de Buruaga (PP)	Parliament	PP	5 (1 RA, 4 DE)	5	5,321 (1%)	590,851	109	28,461	Historical community
	Castile and León; Castilla y León	Valladolid (de facto)	Alfonso Fernández Mañueco (PP)	Cortes	PP and Vox	39 (3 RA, 36 DE)	31	94,223 (18.6%)	2,391,682	25	29,698	Historical community
	Castilla–La Mancha; Castilla-La Mancha	Toledo	Emiliano García-Page (PSOE)	Cortes	PSOE	23 (3 RA, 20 DE)	21	79,463 (15.7%)	2,104,433	26	25,758	Region
	Catalonia; Cataluña; Catalunya; Catalonha	Barcelona	Salvador Illa (PSC)	Parliament	PSC	24 (8 RA, 16 DE)	48	32,114 (6.3%)	8,012,231	239	35,325	Nationality
	Extremadura; Extremadura	Mérida	María Guardiola (PP)	Assembly	PP and Vox	10 (2 RA, 8 DE)	9	41,634 (8.2%)	1,054,681	26	23,604	Region
	Galicia; Galicia	Santiago de Compostela	Alfonso Rueda (PP)	Parliament	PP	19 (3 RA, 16 DE)	23	29,574 (5.8%)	2,705,833	91	28,644	Nationality
	La Rioja; La Rioja	Logroño	Gonzalo Capellán (PP)	Parliament	PP	5 (1 RA, 4 DE)	4	5,045 (1%)	324,184	63	32,828	Region
	Community of Madrid; Comunidad de Madrid	City of Madrid	Isabel Díaz Ayuso (PP)	Assembly	PP	11 (7 RA, 4 DE)	38	8,028 (1.6%)	7,009,268	830	42,198	Region
	Region of Murcia; Región de Murcia	City of Murcia	Fernando López Miras (PP)	Regional Assembly	PP	6 (2 RA, 4 DE)	10	11,313 (2.9%)	1,568,492	132	25,887	Region
	Navarre; Comunidad Foral de Navarra; Nafarroako Foru Komunitatea	Pamplona	María Chivite (PSOE)	Parliament	PSN-PSOE, GBai, C/Z	5 (1 RA, 4 DE)	5	10,391 (2%)	678,333	63	37,088	Nationality
	Valencian Community; Comunidad Valenciana; Comunitat Valenciana	City of Valencia	Juanfran Pérez Llorca (PP)	Corts	PP	17 (5 RA, 12 DE)	33	23,255 (4.6%)	5,319,285	215	26,453	Nationality

RA: Regionally Appointed
DE: Directly Elected

=== Autonomous cities ===
Flag	Coat of arms	Autonomous city	Mayor-President	Legislature	Government coalition	Senate seats	Area (km^{2})	Pop. (2024)	Density (/km^{2})	GRP per capita (€) 2023
	Ceuta	Ceuta	Juan Jesús Vivas (PP)	Assembly	PP	2 (DE)	18.5	83,179	4,583	22,751
	Melilla	Melilla	Juan José Imbroda (PP)	Assembly	PP	2 (DE)	12.3	85,985	7,031	20,479

DE: Directly Elected

== History ==
=== Background ===
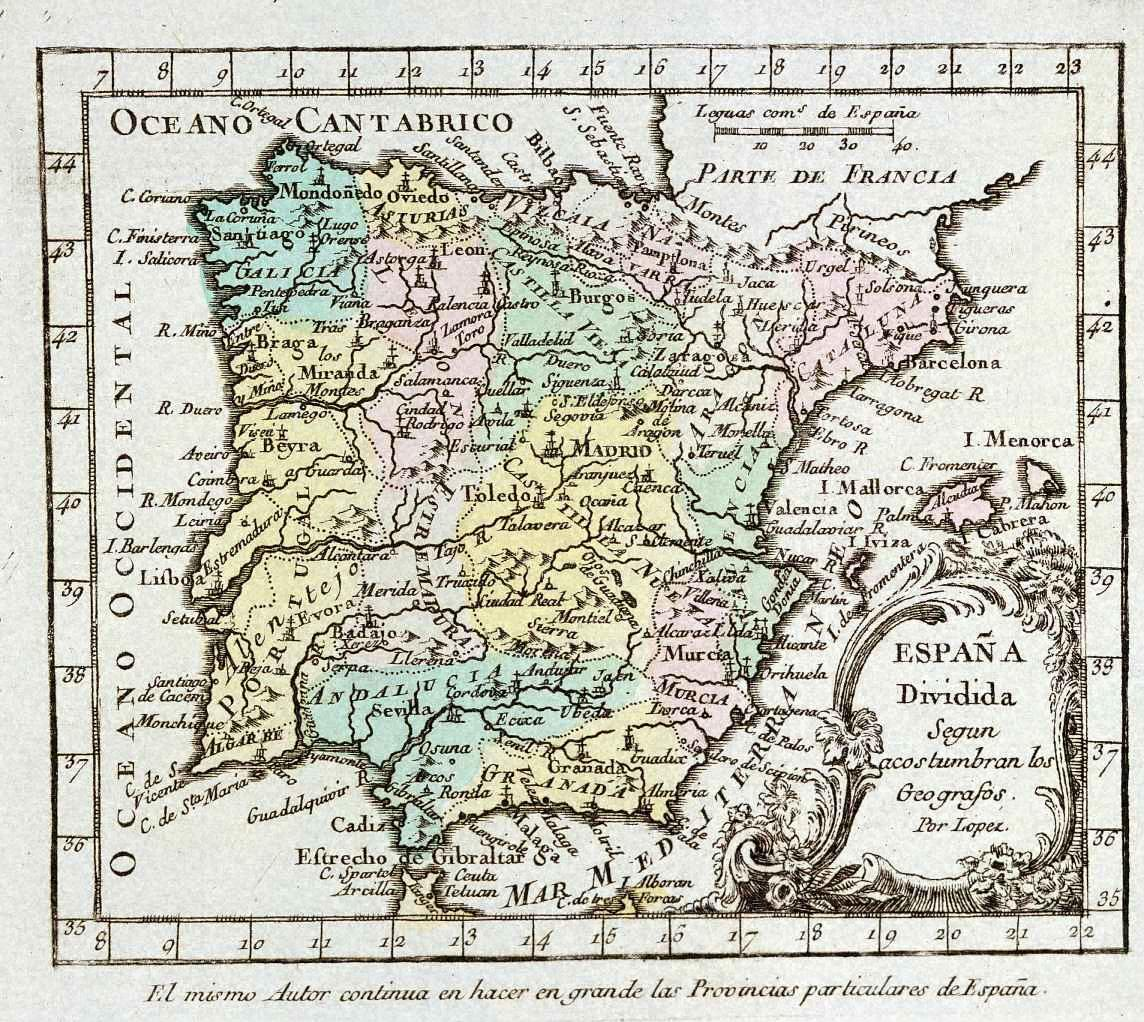
A map of Iberia in 1757

Spain is a diverse country made up of several different regions with varying economic and social structures, as well as different languages and historical, political and cultural traditions. While the entire Spanish territory was united under one crown in 1479, this was not a process of national homogenization or amalgamation. The constituent territories—be they crowns, kingdoms, principalities or dominions—retained much of their former institutional existence, including limited legislative, judicial or fiscal autonomy. These territories also exhibited a variety of local customs, laws, languages and currencies until the mid 19th century.

From the 18th century onwards, the Bourbon kings and the government tried to establish a more centralized regime. Leading figures of the Spanish Enlightenment advocated for the building of a Spanish nation beyond the internal territorial boundaries. This culminated in 1833, when Spain was divided into 49 (now 50) provinces, which served mostly as transmission belts for policies developed in Madrid.

Spanish history since the late 19th century has been shaped by a dialectical struggle between Spanish nationalism and peripheral nationalisms, mostly in Catalonia and the Basque Country, and to a lesser degree in Galicia.

In a response to Catalan demands, limited autonomy was granted to the Commonwealth of Catalonia in 1914, only to be abolished in 1925. It was granted again in 1932 during the Second Spanish Republic, when the Generalitat, Catalonia's mediaeval institution of government, was restored. The constitution of 1931 envisaged a territorial division for all Spain in "autonomous regions", which was never fully attained—only Catalonia, the Basque Country and Galicia had approved "Statutes of Autonomy"—the process being thwarted by the Spanish Civil War that broke out in 1936, and the victory of the rebel Nationalist forces under Francisco Franco.

Franco's dictatorial regime strongly believed that the only way of preserving the "unity of the Spanish nation" was by ruling Spain as a highly centralized state. Peripheral nationalism, along with communism and atheism, were regarded by his regime as the main threats. His attempts to fight separatism with heavy-handed but sporadic repression, and his often severe suppression of language and regional identities backfired: the demands for democracy became intertwined with demands for the recognition of a pluralistic vision of Spanish nationhood.

Upon Franco's death in 1975, Spain entered into a phase of transition to democracy. The most difficult task of the newly democratically elected Cortes Generales (the Spanish Parliament) in 1977 acting as a Constituent Assembly was to transition from Franco's rigid centralism to a more decentralized model in a way that would satisfy the demands of the peripheral nationalists.

The Prime Minister of Spain, Adolfo Suárez, met with Josep Tarradellas, president of the Generalitat of Catalonia in exile. They agreed to restore the Generalitat and transfer limited powers while the constitution was still being written. Shortly after, the government allowed the creation of "assemblies of members of parliament" made up of deputies and senators of the different territories of Spain, so that they could constitute "pre-autonomic regimes" for their regions as well.

The Fathers of the Constitution worked toward balancing the opposing views of Spain—on the one hand, the centralist view inherited from monarchist and nationalist elements of Spanish society, and on the other hand federalism and a pluralistic view of Spain as a "nation of nations"—and developing a uniform decentralization of entities with the same powers and an asymmetrical structure that would distinguish the nationalities. Peripheral nationalist parties wanted a multinational state with a federal or confederal model, while the governing Union of the Democratic Centre (UCD) and the People's Alliance (AP) wanted minimum decentralization; the Spanish Socialist Workers' Party (PSOE) was sympathetic to a federal system.

In the end, the constitution, published and ratified in 1978, found a balance in recognizing the existence of "nationalities and regions" in Spain, within the "indissoluble unity of the Spanish nation." In order to manage the tensions present in the Spanish transition to democracy, the drafters of the current Spanish constitution avoided giving labels such as 'federal' to the territorial arrangements, while enshrining in the constitution the right to autonomy or self-government of the "nationalities and regions" through a process of asymmetric devolution of power to the "autonomous communities" that were to be created.

=== Constitution of 1978 ===
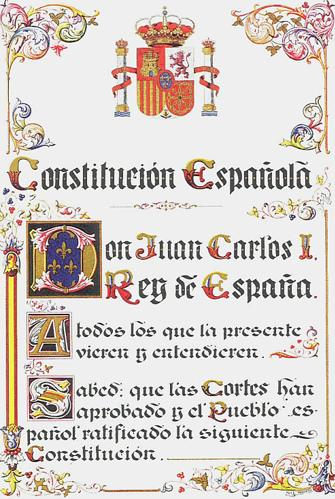
First page of the Spanish Constitution.

The starting point in the territorial organization of Spain was the second article of the constitution, which reads:

The Constitution is based on the indissoluble unity of the Spanish Nation, the common and indivisible homeland of all Spaniards; it recognizes and guarantees the right to self-government of the nationalities and regions of which it is composed and the solidarity among them all.

— Second Article of the Spanish Constitution of 1978

The constitution was rather ambiguous on how this was to take place. It does not define, detail, or impose the structure of the state; it does not tell the difference between "nation" and "nationality"; and it does not specify which are the "nationalities" and which are the "regions", or the territories they comprise. Rather than imposing, it enables a process towards a decentralized structure based on the exercise that these "nationalities and regions" would make of the right to self-government that they were granted. As such, the outcome of this exercise was not predictable and its construction was deliberately open-ended; the constitution only created a process for an eventual devolution, but it was voluntary in nature: the "nationalities and regions" themselves had the option of choosing to attain self-government or not.

In order to exercise this right, the constitution established an open process whereby the "nationalities and regions" could be constituted as "autonomous communities". Provinces would serve as the building blocks and constituent parts of the autonomous communities. The 50 provinces were a pre-existing territorial division of the liberal centralizing regime of the 19th century created for purely administrative purposes (and in the 1978 Constitution were defined as groupings of municipalities). The constitution stipulated that the following could be constituted as autonomous communities:

- Two or more adjacent provinces with common historical, cultural and economic characteristics
- Insular territories
- A single province with a "historical regional identity"

It also allowed for exceptions to the above criteria, in that the Spanish Parliament could:

- authorize, in the nation's interest, the constitution of an autonomous community even if it was a single province without a historical regional identity (which allowed for example, the creation of the Community of Madrid, which had been part of the historical region of Castile–La Mancha); and to
- authorize or grant autonomy to entities or territories that were not provinces (which allowed for the creation of two autonomous cities, Spanish exclaves in North Africa).

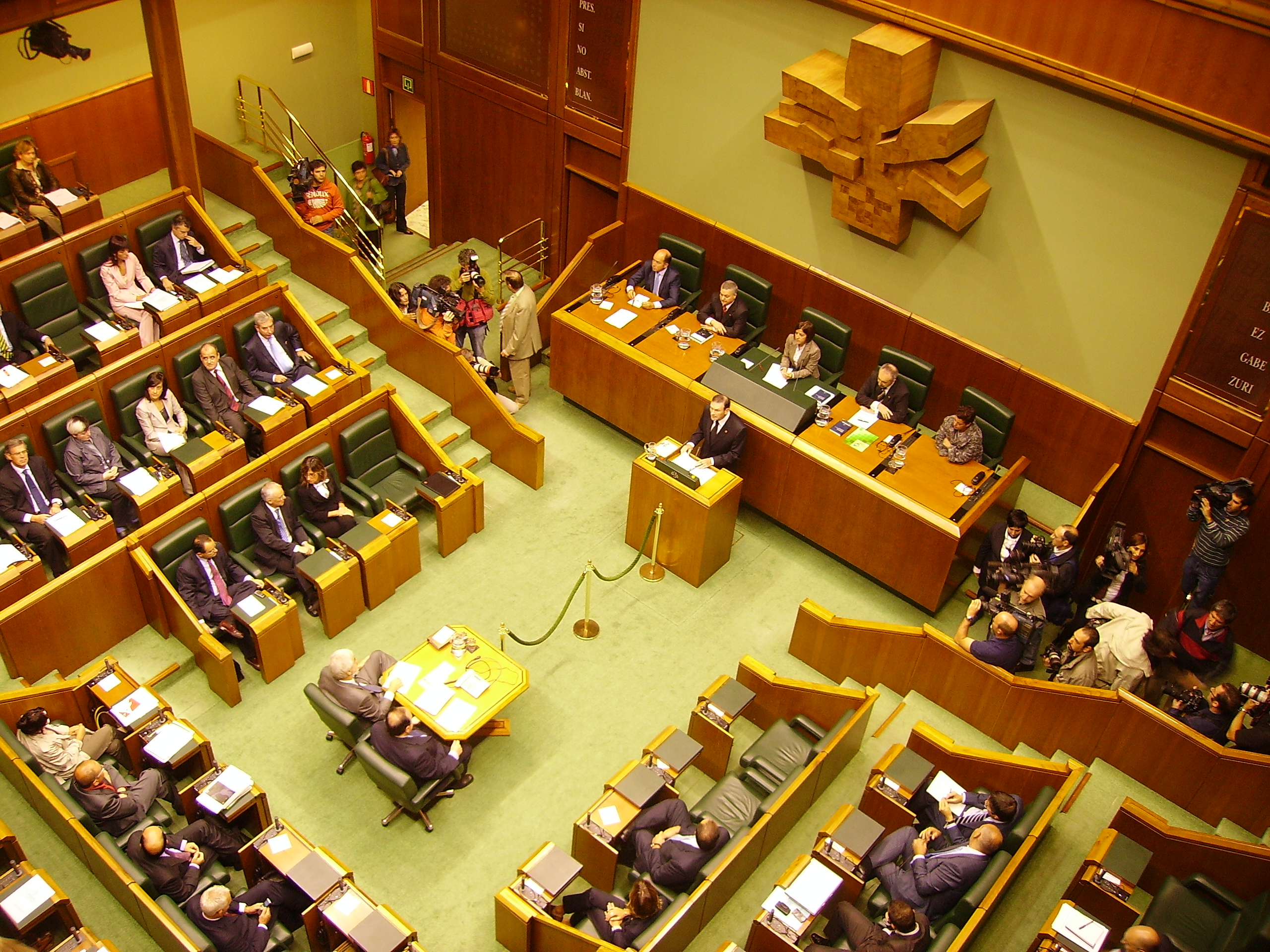
The Basque Parliament or the Eusko Legebiltzarra, in session.

The constitution also established two "routes" to accede to autonomy. The "fast route" or "fast track", also called the "exception", was established in article 151, and was implicitly reserved for the three "historical nationalities"—Catalonia, the Basque Country and Galicia, regions with strong regional identities—in that the very strict requirements to opt for this route were waived for those territories that had approved a "Statute of Autonomy" during the Second Spanish Republic (1931–1936). Otherwise, the constitution required the approval of three-fourths of the municipalities involved whose population would be at least the majority of the electoral census of each province, and required the ratification through a referendum with the affirmative vote of the absolute majority of the electoral census of each province (that is, of all registered citizens, not only of those who would vote).

While the constitution was still being drafted, and self-government seemed likely to be granted only to the "historical nationalities", there was a popular outcry in Andalusia, demanding self-government as well, which led to the creation of a quicker process for that region, which eventually self-identified as a "historical nationality" as well. In the end, the right to self-government was extended to any other region that wanted it.

The "slow route" or "slow track", also called the "norm", was established in Article 143. This route could be taken—via the first transitory disposition—by the "pre-autonomic regimes" that had been constituted in 1978, while the constitution was still being drafted, if approved by two-thirds of all municipalities involved whose population would sum up to at least the majority of the electoral census of each province or insular territory. These communities would assume limited powers (Spanish: competencias) during a provisional period of 5 years, after which they could assume further powers, upon negotiation with the central government. However, the constitution did not explicitly establish an institutional framework for these communities. They could have established a parliamentary system like the "historical nationalities", or they could have not assumed any legislative powers and simply established mechanisms for the administration of the powers they were granted.

The constitution also explicitly established that the institutional framework for these communities would be a parliamentary system, with a Legislative Assembly elected by universal suffrage, a cabinet or "council of government", a president of such a council, elected by the Assembly, and a High Court of Justice. They were also granted a maximum level of devolved powers.

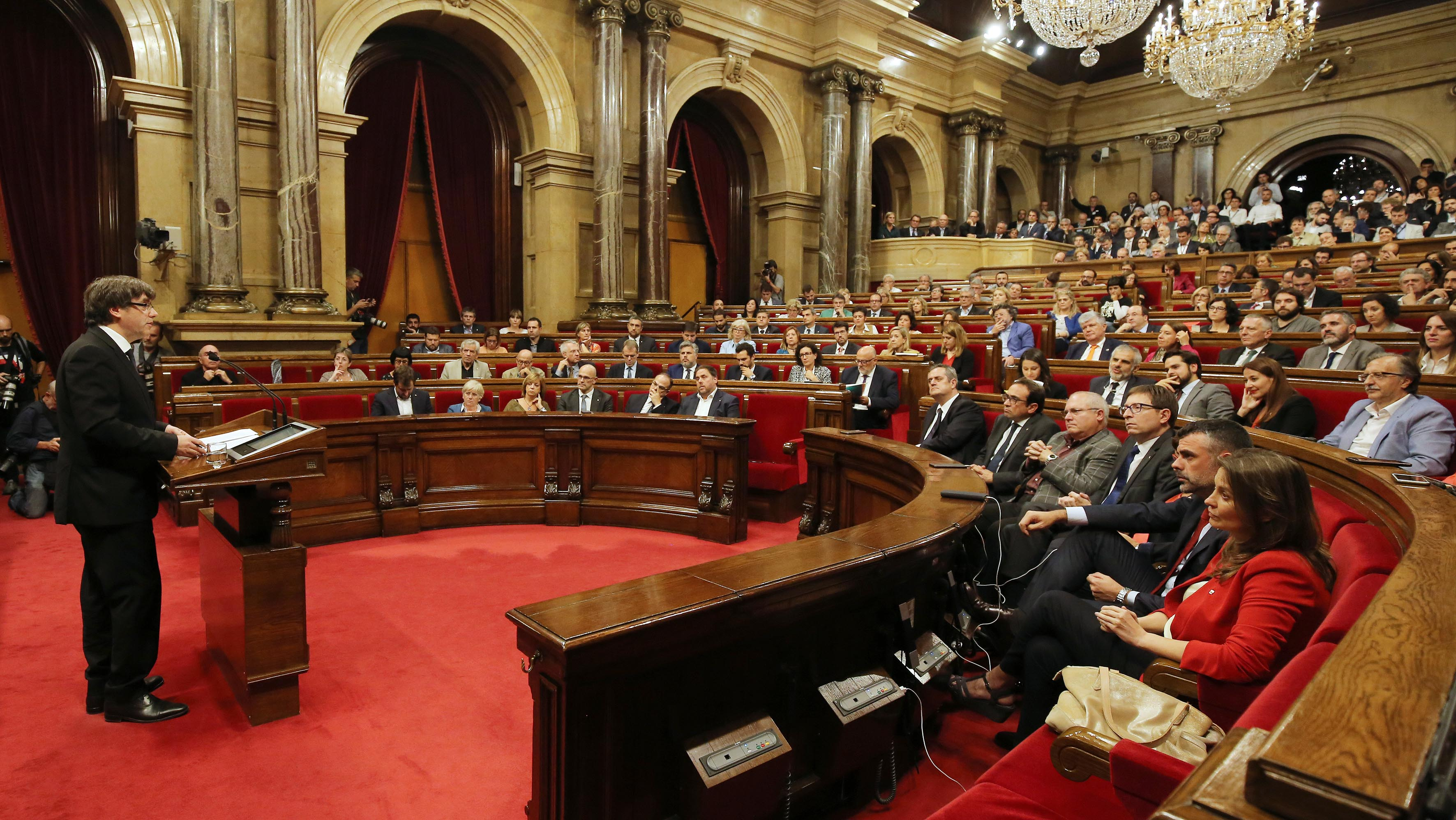
The Parliament of Catalonia or the Parlament de Catalunya, in 2017.

While the constitution did not establish how many autonomous communities were to be created, on 31 July 1981, Leopoldo Calvo-Sotelo, then the prime minister of Spain and Felipe González, leader of the opposition in Parliament, signed the "First Autonomic Pacts" (Primeros pactos autonómicos in Spanish), in which they agreed to the creation of 17 autonomous communities and two autonomous cities, with the same institutions of government, but different competences. By 1983, all 17 autonomous communities were constituted: Andalusia, Aragon, Asturias, the Balearic Islands, the Basque Country, the Canary Islands, Cantabria, Castile and León, Castile–La Mancha, Catalonia, the Community of Madrid, Extremadura, Galicia, La Rioja, Navarra, the Region of Murcia and the Valencian Community. The two autonomous cities, Ceuta and Melilla, were constituted in 1995.

Once the autonomous communities were created, Article 145 prohibits the "federation of autonomous communities". This was understood as any agreement between communities that would produce an alteration to the political and territorial equilibrium that would cause a confrontation between different blocks of communities, an action incompatible with the principle of solidarity and the unity of the nation.

The so-called "additional" and "transitory" dispositions of the constitution allowed for some exceptions to the above-mentioned framework. In terms of territorial organization, the fifth transitory disposition established that Ceuta and Melilla could be constituted as "autonomous communities" if the absolute majority of the members of their city councils would agree on such a motion, and with the approval of the Spanish Parliament, which would exercise its prerogatives to grant autonomy to other entities besides provinces.

However one aspect of this asymmetry in powers between regions is a cause of friction, namely that the Basque Country and Navarre can raise their own taxes and negotiate a transfer to Madrid to pay for common services and hence, unlike the other regions, do not contribute to fiscal equalisation across Spain. These two regions or communities are known as "chartered" territories, (Note: "Historical territories" or "chartered territories" (in Spanish: territorios históricos or territorios forales, in Basque: lurralde historikoak or foru lurraldeak).) In all other communities, all taxes are levied and collected by or for the central government and then redistributed among all.

=== Autonomic pacts ===
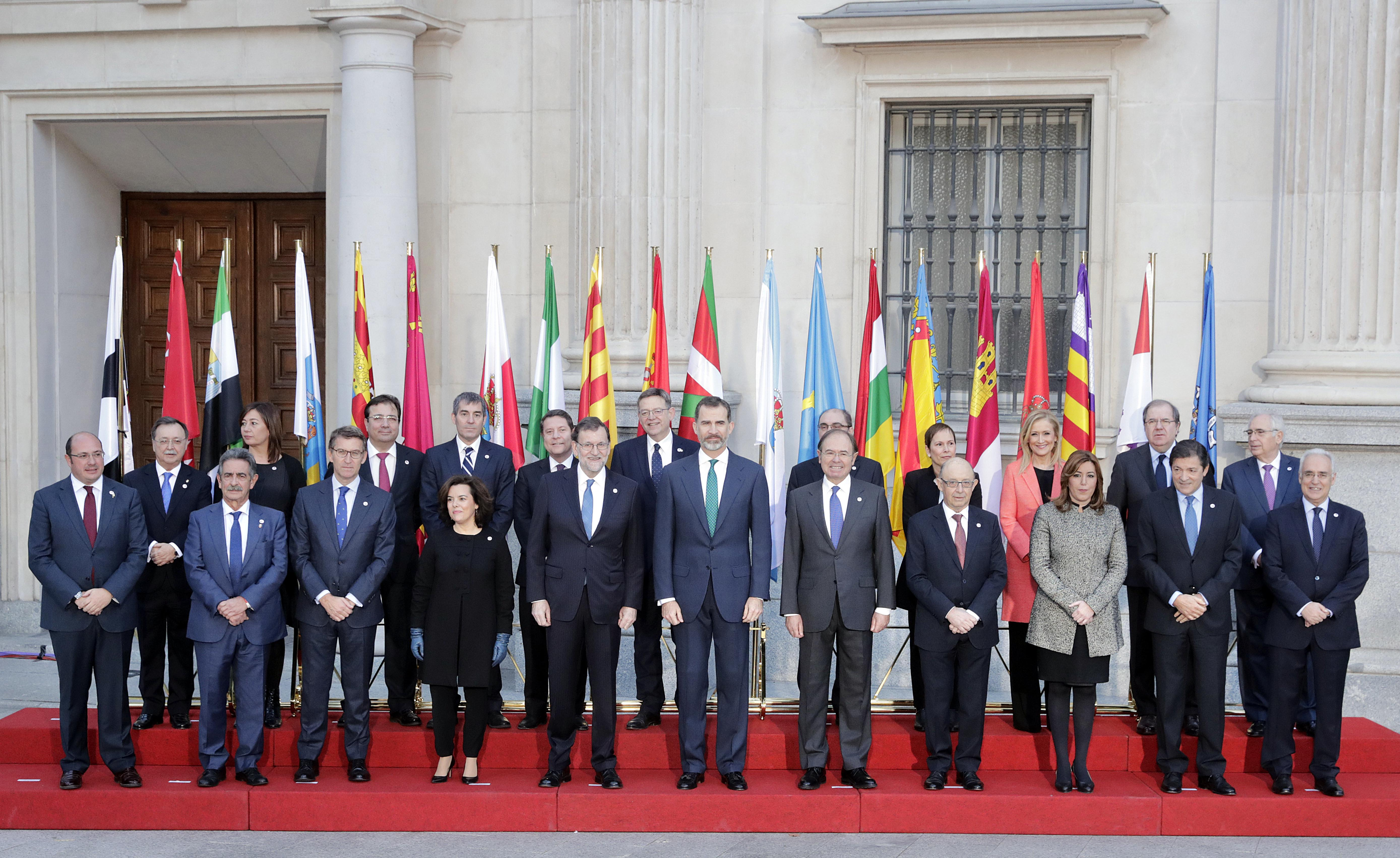
The Conference of Presidents in 2017, is the meeting between the Government of Spain or Gobierno de la Nación and the presidents of the Autonomous communities of Spain.

The Statutes of Autonomy of the Basque Country and Catalonia were sanctioned by the Spanish Parliament on 18 December 1979. The position of the party in government, the Union of the Democratic Centre (UCD), was that only the three "historical nationalities" would assume full powers, while the rest would accede to autonomy via article 143, assuming fewer powers and perhaps not even establishing institutions of government. This was firmly opposed by the representatives of Andalusia, who demanded for their region the maximum level of powers granted to the "nationalities".

After a massive rally in support of autonomy, a referendum was organized for Andalusia to attain autonomy through the strict requirements of article 151, or the "fast route"—with UCD calling for abstention, and the main party in opposition in Parliament, the Spanish Socialist Workers' Party (PSOE) calling for a vote in favour. These requirements were not met, as in one of the eight provinces, Almería, votes in favour — although the plurality — did not amount to half of the electoral census as required. Yet, in general, the results of the referendum had been clear and unequivocal.

After several months of discussion, the then prime minister of Spain, Adolfo Suárez and the leader of the opposition, Felipe González, reached an agreement to resolve the Andalusian issue, whereby the Parliament approved an amendment to the law that regulated referendums, and used a prerogative of article 144c of the constitution, both actions which combined would allow Andalusia to take the fast route. They also agreed that no other region would take the "fast route", but that all regions would establish a parliamentary system with all institutions of government. This opened a phase that was dubbed as café para todos, "coffee for all". This agreement was eventually put into writing in July 1981 in what has been called the "first autonomic pacts".

These "autonomic pacts" (Note: "Autonomic pacts" or "autonomic agreements" (in Spanish: pactos autonómicos or acuerdos autonómicos).) filled in the gap left by the open character of the constitution. Among other things:

- They described the final outline of the territorial division of Spain, with the specific number and name of the autonomous communities to be created.
- They restricted the "fast route" to the "historical nationalities" and Andalusia; all the rest had to take the "slow route".
- They established that all autonomous communities would have institutions of government within a parliamentary system.
- They set up a deadline for all the remaining communities to be constituted: 1 February 1983.

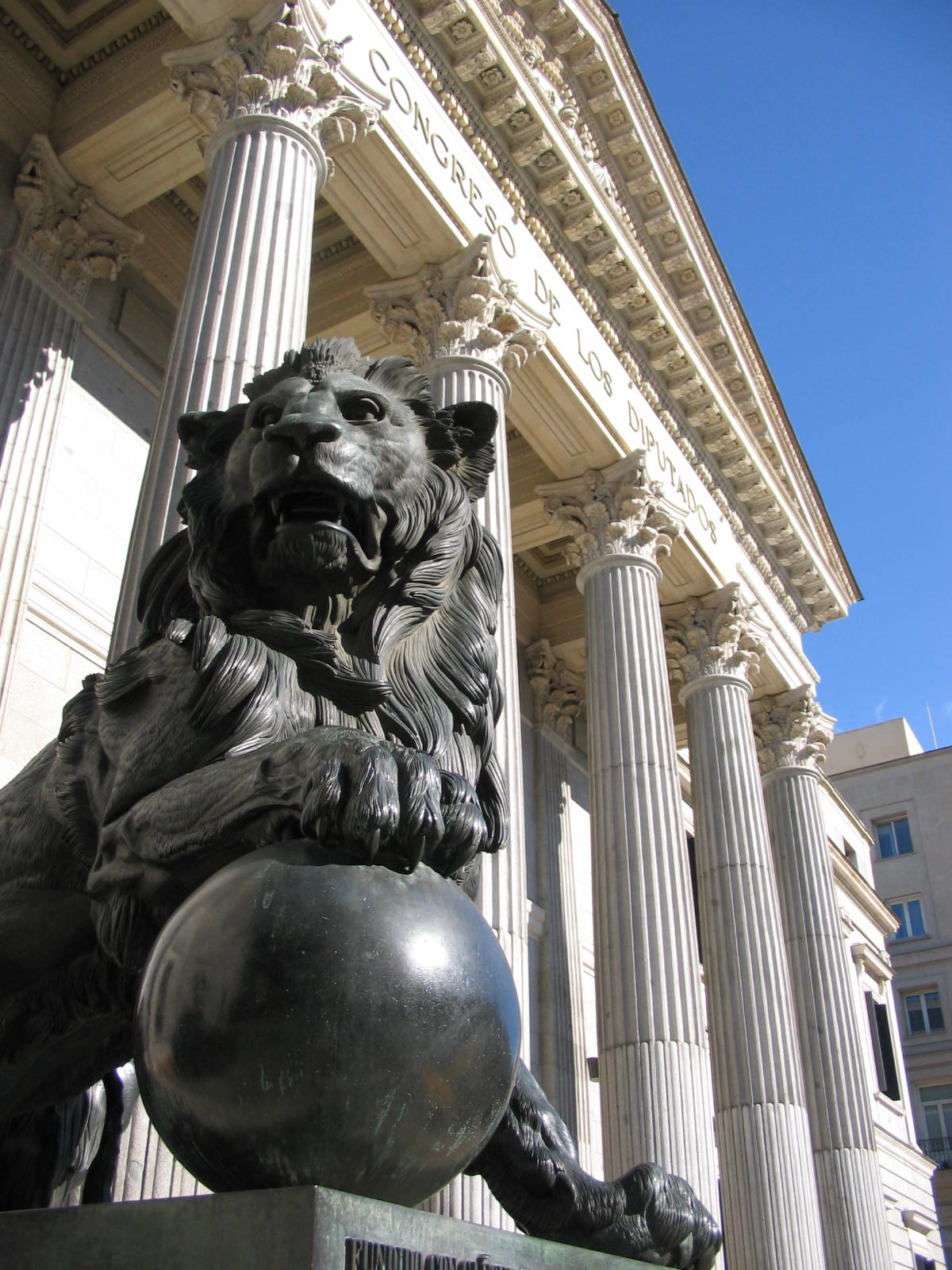
The Spanish Parliament, Congress of Deputies

In the end, 17 autonomous communities were created:

- Andalusia, and the three "historical nationalities"—the Basque Country, Catalonia and Galicia—took the "fast route" and immediately assumed the maximum set of powers allowed in the constitution; the rest took the "slow route".
- Aragon, Castilla–La Mancha (formerly New Castile), Castile and León, Extremadura and the Valencian Community acceded to autonomy as communities made up of two or more provinces with common historical, economic and cultural characteristics.
- The Balearic Islands and the Canary Islands acceded to autonomy as insular territories, the latter made up of two provinces.
- Principality of Asturias, Cantabria, La Rioja and Murcia acceded to autonomy as single provinces with historical identity (also called "uniprovincial" autonomous communities).
- Navarre, as a single province, acceded to autonomy through the recognition, update and improvement of its historical and local fueros (chartered laws), and as such, it is known as a "chartered community".
- The province of Madrid, home to the national capital, was removed from Castilla–La Mancha, to which it previously belonged, and constituted as a single-province autonomous community in the "national interest", the Community of Madrid.

Special provisions were made for the Valencian Community and the Canary Islands in that, although they took the "slow route", through the subsequent approval of specific organic laws, they were to assume full autonomy in less than 5 years, since they had started a process towards the "fast route" prior to the approval of the "autonomic pacts".

On the other hand, Cantabria and La Rioja, although originally part of Old Castile—and both originally included in the "pre-autonomic regime" of Castile and León—were granted autonomy as single provinces with historical identity, a move supported by the majority of their populations. The "autonomic pacts" give both Cantabria and La Rioja the option of being incorporated into Castile and León in the future, and required that the Statutes of Autonomy of all three communities include such a provision. León, a historical kingdom and historical region of Spain, once joined to Old Castile to form Castile and León, was denied secession to be constituted as an autonomous community on its own right.

During the second half of the 1980s, the central government seemed reluctant to transfer all powers to the "slow route" communities. After the five years set up by the constitution, all "slow route" communities demanded the maximum transfer guaranteed by the constitution. This led to what has been called the "second autonomic pacts" of 1992, between the then prime minister of Spain Felipe González from PSOE and the leader of the opposition, José María Aznar from the newly created People's Party (PP), successor to the People's Alliance party. Through these agreements new powers were transferred, with the reforms to many Statutes of Autonomy of the "slow-route" communities with the aim of equalizing them to the "fast route" communities. In 1995, the cities of Ceuta and Melilla were removed from Andalusia and constituted as "autonomous cities" without legislative powers, but with an autonomous assembly not subordinated to any other province or community.

The creation of the autonomous communities was a diverse process, that started with the constitution, was normalized with the autonomic pacts and was completed with the Statutes of Autonomy. It is, however, an ongoing process; further devolution—or even the return of transferred powers—is always a possibility. This has been evidenced in the 2000s, at the beginning with a wave of approval of new Statutes of Autonomy for many communities, with many considering the recentralization of some powers after the 2008 financial crisis. Nonetheless, Spain is now a decentralized country with a unique structure similar but not equal to a federation, even though in many respects the country can be compared to countries which are undeniably federal. The resulting system is referred to as an "autonomous state", or more precisely "state of autonomies".

=== Current state of affairs ===
With the implementation of the Autonomous Communities, Spain went from being one of the most centralized countries in the OECD to being one of the most decentralized; in particular, it has been the country where the incomes and outcomes of the decentralized bodies (the Autonomous Communities) has grown the most, leading this rank in Europe by 2015 and being fifth among OECD countries in tax devolution (after Canada, Switzerland, the United States and Austria). By means of the State of Autonomies implemented after the Spanish Constitution of 1978, Spain has been quoted to be "remarkable for the extent of the powers peacefully devolved over the past 30 years" and "an extraordinarily decentralized country", with the central government accounting for just 18% of public spending, 38% by the regional governments, 13% by the local councils, and the remaining 31% by the social security system.

In terms of personnel, by 2010 almost 1,350,000 people or 50.3% of the total civil servants in Spain were employed by the autonomous communities; city and provincial councils accounted for 23.6% and those employees working for the central administration (police and military included) represented 22.2% of the total.

== Movement for further autonomy ==
Peripheral nationalism continues to play a key role in Spanish politics. Some peripheral nationalists view that there is a vanishing practical distinction between the terms "nationalities" and "regions", as more powers are transferred to all communities in roughly the same degree and as other communities have chosen to identify themselves as "nationalities". In fact, it has been argued that the establishment of the State of Autonomies "has led to the creation of "new regional identities", and "invented communities". Many in Galicia, the Basque Country, and Catalonia view their communities as "nations", not just "nationalities", and Spain as a "plurinational state" or a "nation of nations", and they have made demands for further devolution or secession.

=== Basque Country ===
In 2004 the Basque Parliament approved the Ibarretxe Plan, whereby the Basque Country would approve a new Statute of Autonomy containing key provisions such as shared sovereignty with Spain, full independence of the judiciary, and the right to self-determination, and assuming all powers except that of the Spanish nationality law, defense, and monetary policy. The plan was rejected by the Spanish Parliament in 2005 and the situation has remained largely stable in that front so far.

=== Catalonia ===
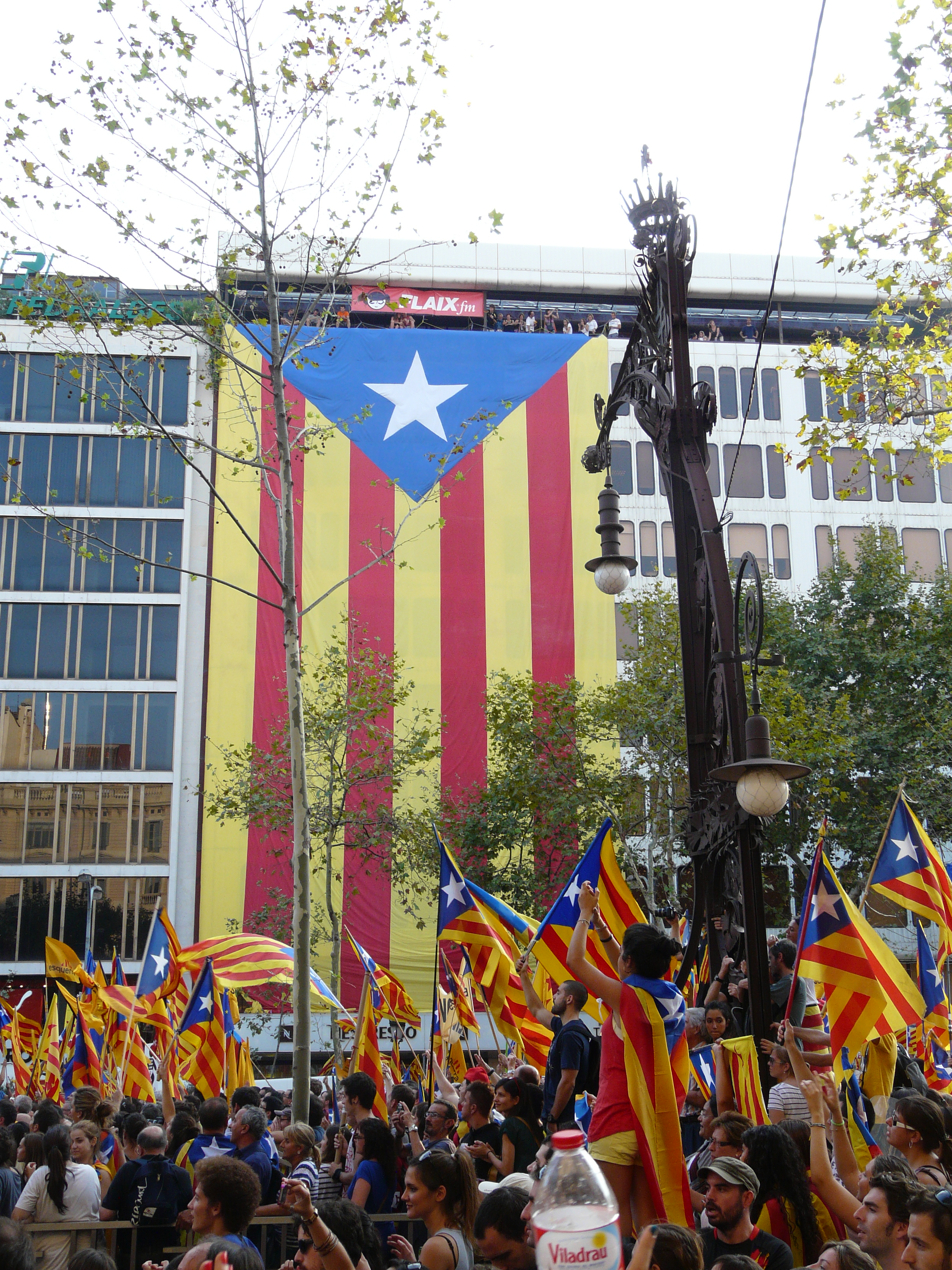
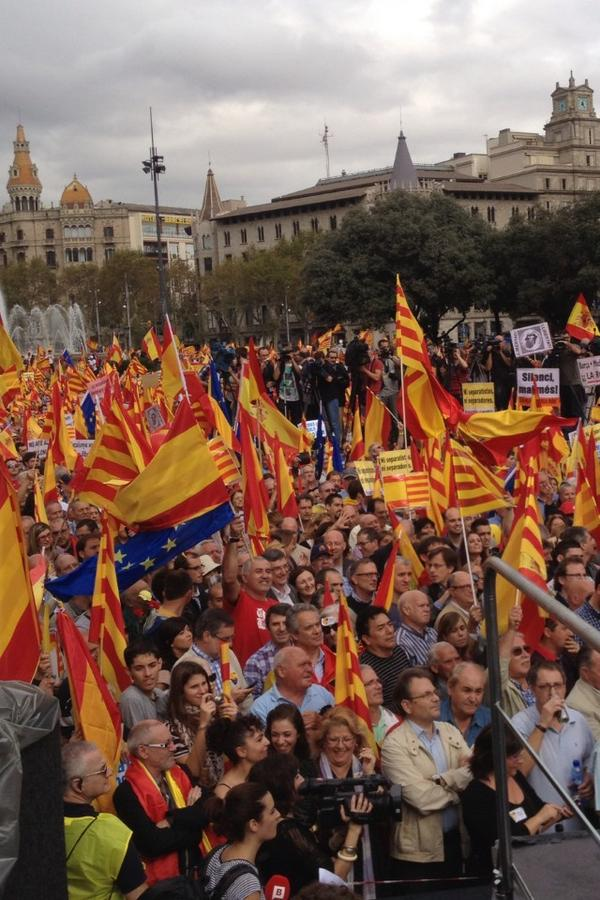
Pro-Catalan independence (left) and pro-Spanish unity demonstrations in Barcelona.

A particularly contentious point – especially in Catalonia – has been the one of fiscal tensions, with Catalan nationalists intensifying their demand for further financing during the 2010s. In this regard, the new rules for fiscal decentralisation in force since 2011 already make Spain one of the most decentralized countries in the world also in budgetary and fiscal matters, with the base for income tax split at 50/50 between the Spanish government and the regions (something unheard of in much bigger federal states such as Germany or the United States, which retain the income tax as an exclusively or primarily federal one). Besides, each region can also decide to set its own income tax bands and its own additional rates, higher or lower than the federal rates, with the corresponding income accruing to the region which no longer has to share it with other regions. This current level of fiscal decentralisation has been regarded by economists such as Thomas Piketty as troublesome since, in his view, "challenges the very idea of solidarity within the country and comes down to playing the regions against each other, which is particularly problematic when the issue is one of income tax as this is supposed to enable the reduction of inequalities between the richest and the poorest, over and above regional or professional identities".

==== Catalan independence ====
The severe economic crisis in Spain that started in 2008 produced different reactions in the different communities. On one hand, some began to consider a return of some responsibilities to the central government while, on the other hand, in Catalonia debate on the fiscal deficit—"Catalonia being one of the largest net contributors in taxes"—led many to support secession. In September 2012, Artur Mas, then Catalonia's president, requested from the central government a new "fiscal agreement", with the possibility of giving his community powers of fiscal autonomy equal to those of the chartered communities, but prime minister Mariano Rajoy refused. Mas dissolved the Catalan Parliament, called for new elections, and promised to conduct a referendum on independence within the next four years.

Rajoy's government declared that they would use all "legal instruments"—current legislation requires the central executive government or the Congress of Deputies to call for or sanction a binding referendum— to block any such attempt. The Spanish Socialist Workers' Party and its counterpart in Catalonia proposed to reopen the debate on the territorial organization of Spain, changing the constitution to create a true federal system to "better reflect the singularities" of Catalonia, as well as to modify the current taxation system.

In 2017 and 2018 the situation developed into constitutional crisis. Following a highly fraught attempted referendum, on Friday 27 October 2017 the Catalan Parliament voted on the independence of Catalonia; the result was 70 in favor, 10 against, 2 neither, with 53 representatives not present in protest. In the following days, the members of the Catalan government either fled or were imprisoned.

One scholar summarises the current situation as follows:

the autonomous state appears to have come full circle, with reproaches from all sides. According to some, it has not gone far enough and has failed to satisfy their aspirations for improved self-government. For others it has gone too far, fostering inefficiency or reprehensible linguistic policies.

=== Possible rearrangements ===
Besides the territorial disputes that Spain holds with the United Kingdom, Morocco and Portugal, some forces have campaigned for the redistribution of territories among communities:

- There are independence movements pleading for secession from Spain in Catalonia, the Basque Country and Navarre, Galicia and the Canary Islands.
- The Basque Statute of Autonomy and the fourth transitory provision of the 1978 Spanish Constitution provide a pathway for the integration of Navarre in the Basque autonomous community. The Parliament of Navarre has not entertained the possibility.
- The Treviño enclave (formed by the municipalities of Condado de Treviño and La Puebla de Arganzón) is part of the province of Burgos (in the autonomous community of Castile and León) but is surrounded by Álava (Basque autonomous community). There is a dispute in which the Castilian-Leonese government support the status quo and the Basque Government and much of the local population support integration in Álava and the Basque Country.
- Similarly, Valle de Villaverde is part of the autonomous community of Cantabria but surrounded by Biscay, in the Basque autonomous community. Local support for integration in the Basque Country has recently diminished.
- Leonesism calls for the establishment of a separate autonomous community of León constituting the provinces of León, Zamora and Salamanca (or in a restricted sense, just the province of León), pursuant to the configuration of the former Region of León.
- The Ayuntamiento of La Línea de la Concepción has asked for permission to call a referendum on the secession of the municipality from the province of Cádiz in the autonomous community of Andalusia to become a standalone autonomous community, citing the special case of bordering Gibraltar.

== Constitutional and statutory framework ==
The State of Autonomies, as established in Article 2 of the constitution, has been argued to be based on four principles: willingness to accede to autonomy, unity in diversity, autonomy but not sovereignty of the communities, and solidarity among them all. The structure of the autonomous communities is determined both by the devolution allowed by the constitution and the powers assumed in their respective Statutes of Autonomy. While the autonomic agreements and other laws have allowed for an "equalization" of all communities, differences still remain.

=== The Statute of Autonomy ===
The Statute of Autonomy is the basic institutional law of the autonomous community or city, recognized by the Spanish constitution in article 147. It is approved by a parliamentary assembly representing the community, and then approved by the Cortes Generales, the Spanish Parliament, through an "Organic Law", requiring the favourable vote of the absolute majority of the Congress of Deputies.

For communities that acceded to autonomy through the "fast route", a referendum is required before it can be sanctioned by the Parliament. The Statutes of Autonomy must contain, at least, the name of the community, its territorial limits, the names, organization and seat of the institutions of government, the powers they assume and the principles for their bilingual policy, if applicable.

The Constitution establishes that all powers not explicitly assumed by the State (the central government) in the constitution, can be assumed by the autonomous community in their Statutes of Autonomy; but also, all powers not explicitly assumed by the autonomous community in their Statutes of Autonomy are automatically assumed by the State. In case of conflict, the constitution prevails. In case of disagreement, any administration can bring the case before the Constitutional Court of Spain.

=== Institutional organization ===
All autonomous communities have a parliamentary system based on a division of powers comprising:

- A Legislative Assembly, whose members are elected by universal suffrage according to a system of proportional representation, in which all areas that integrate the territory are fairly represented
- A Council of Government, with executive and administrative powers, headed by a prime minister, whose official title is "president", (Note: In the Basque Country, the head of government is officially known as lehendakari in Basque, or by the Spanish rendering of the title, lendakari.) (Note: "Autonomic president", "regional president", or simply "president" (in Spanish: presidente autonómico, presidente regional, or simply presidente; in Catalan/Valencian: president autonòmic, president regional, or simply president; in Galician: presidente autonómico, presidente rexional, or simply presidente). In the Basque language lehendakari is not translated.) elected by the Legislative Assembly—usually the leader of the party or coalition with a majority in the Assembly—and nominated by the King of Spain
- A High Court of Justice, hierarchically under the Supreme Court of Spain

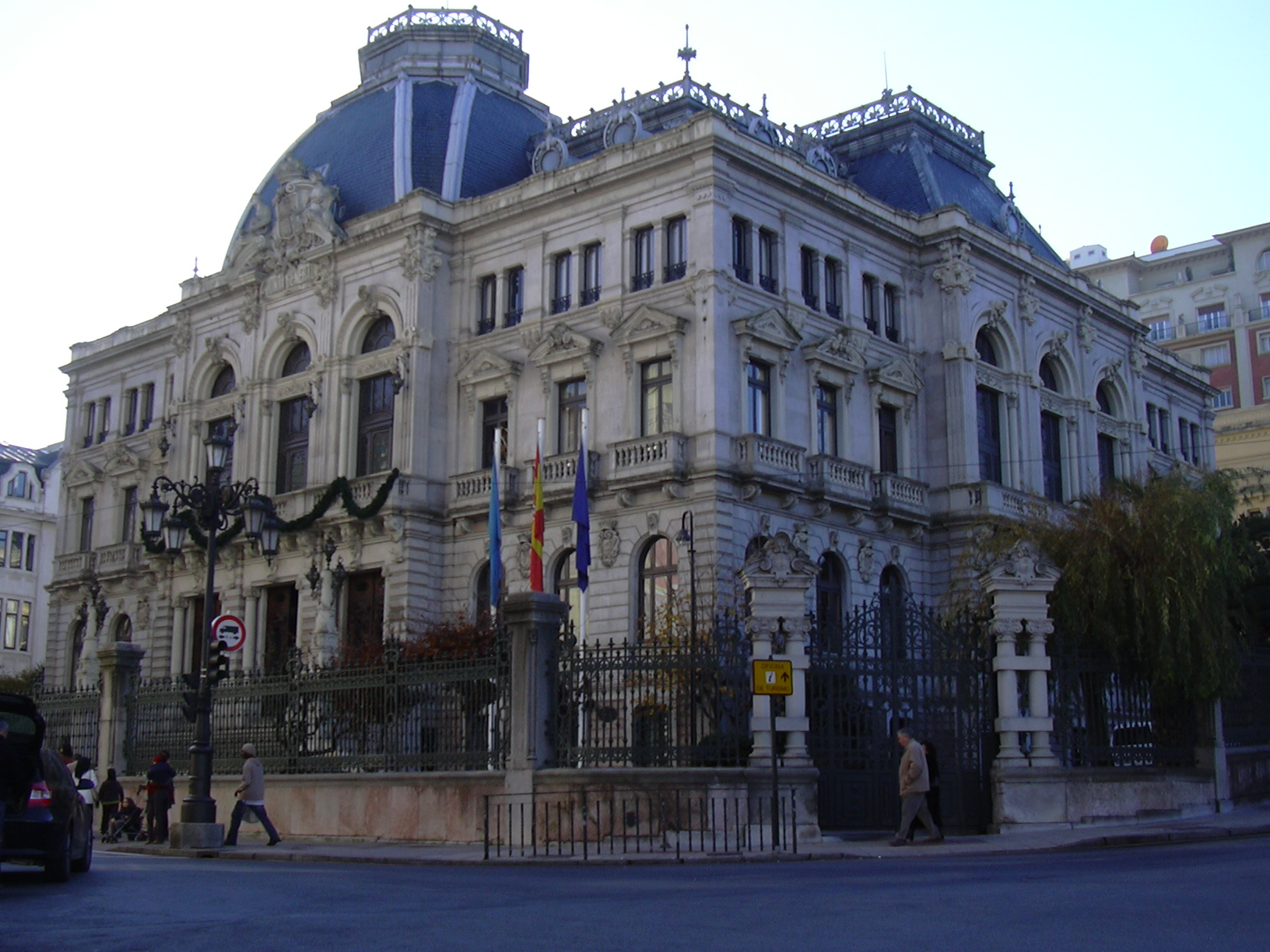
Regional Palace, seat of the General Junta, the Parliament of the Principality of Asturias

The majority of the communities have approved regional electoral laws within the limits set up by the laws for the entire country. Despite minor differences, all communities use proportional representation following the D'Hondt method; all members of regional parliaments are elected for four-year terms, but the president of the community has the faculty to dissolve the legislature and call for early elections. Nonetheless, in all communities except for the Basque Country, Catalonia, Galicia, and Andalusia, elections are held the last Sunday of May every four years, concurrent with municipal elections in all of Spain.

The names of the Council of Government and the Legislative Assembly vary between communities. In some autonomous communities, these institutions are restored historical bodies of government or representation of the previous kingdoms or regional entities within the Spanish Crown—like the Generalitat of Catalonia—while others are entirely new creations.

In some, both the executive and the legislature, though constituting two separate institutions, are collectively identified with a single specific name. A specific denomination may not refer to the same branch of government in all communities; for example, junta may refer to the executive office in some communities, to the legislature in others, or to the collective name of all branches of government in others.

Given the ambiguity in the constitution that did not specify which territories were nationalities and which were regions, other territories, besides the implicit three "historical nationalities", have also chosen to identify themselves as nationalities, in accordance with their historical regional identity, such as Andalusia, Aragon, the Balearic Islands, the Canary Islands, and the Valencian Community.

The two autonomous cities have more limited powers than autonomous communities, but less limited than other municipalities. The executive is exercised by a president, who is also the mayor of the city. In the same way, limited legislative power is vested in a local assembly in which the deputies are also the city councillors.

=== Legal powers ===
The autonomic agreements of 1982 and 1992 tried to equalize powers (Spanish: competencias) devolved to the 17 autonomous communities, within the limits of the constitution and the differences guaranteed by it. This has led to an "asymmetrical homogeneity". In the words of the Constitutional Court of Spain in its ruling of 5 August 1983, the autonomous communities are characterized by their "homogeneity and diversity...equal in their subordination to the constitutional order, in the principles of their representation in the Senate, in their legitimation before the Constitutional Court, and in that the differences between the distinct Statutes [of Autonomy] cannot imply economic or social privileges; however, they can be unequal with respect to the process to accede to autonomy and the concrete determination of the autonomic content of their Statute, and therefore, in their scope of powers. The autonomic regime is characterized by an equilibrium between homogeneity and diversity ... Without the former there will be no unity or integration in the state's ensemble; without the latter, there would not be [a] true plurality and the capacity of self-government".

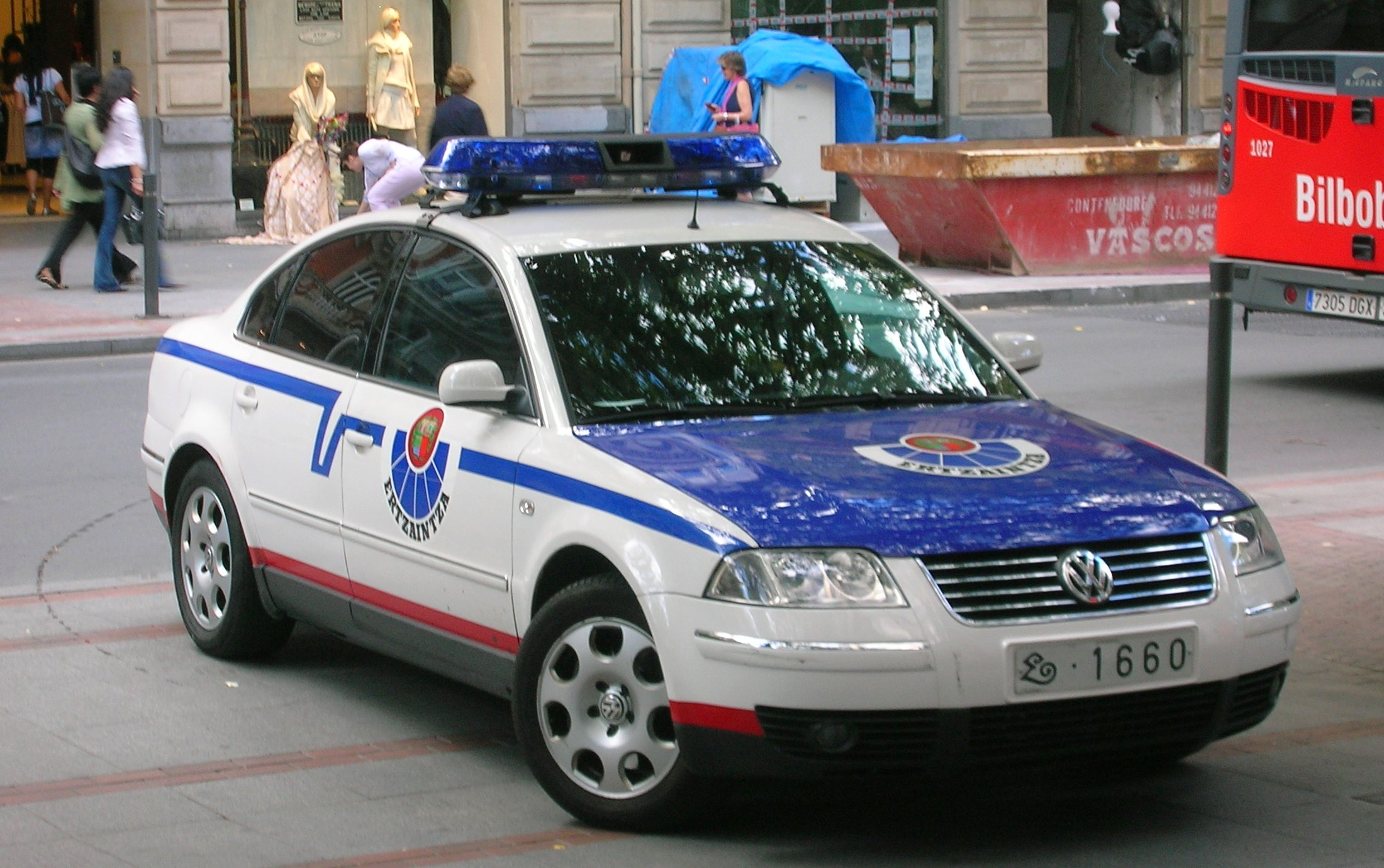
An Ertzaintza police car in the Basque Country

The asymmetrical devolution is a unique characteristic of the territorial structure of Spain, in that the autonomous communities have a different range of devolved powers. These were based on what has been called in Spanish as hechos diferenciales, "differential facts" or "differential traits". (Note: "Differential facts", or, "traits" (in Spanish: hechos diferenciales, in Basque: eragin diferentziala, in Catalan/Valencian: fets diferencials, in Galician: feitos diferenciais).)

This expression refers to the idea that some communities have particular traits, with respect to Spain as a whole. In practice these traits are a native "language proper to their own territories" separate from Spanish, a particular financial regime or special civil rights expressed in a code, which generate a distinct political personality. These hechos diferenciales of their distinct political and historical personality are constitutionally and statutorily (i. e., in their Statutes of Autonomy) recognized in the exceptions granted to some of them and the additional powers they assume.

However a doctrine that came to be called café para todos (coffee for everyone), sought to harmonise the autonomy model across Spain while simultaneously reinforcing the primacy of the central government and dilute claims of ethno-territorial distinctiveness from the historic nationalities. In particular, the organic law on the Harmonisation of the Autonomy Process (LOAPA) in 1982 not only extended powers to the other communities to achieve similar powers as the historic nationalities, but showed an intention to reverse already devolved powers.

The powers to be exercised can be divided into three groups: exclusive to the State or central government, shared powers, and devolved powers exclusive to the communities. Powers can also be "executive", meaning the autonomous community may have exclusive responsibility for the administration of a policy area but may only have executive (i. e., carries out) powers as far as the policy itself is concerned, meaning it must enforce policy and laws decided at the national level.

The Constitution states which powers are exclusive to the central government: international relations, defense, administration of justice, commercial, criminal, civil, and labour legislation, customs, general finances and state debt, public health, basic legislation, and general coordination. As the Constitution had not set clearly defined methods for power sharing, particularly over shared powers, there had been major conflict because the real power of an autonomous community depended upon how far the State wanted to legislate. There is now a large body of case-law produced by the Constitutional Court to clarify ambiguities.

All autonomous communities have the power to manage their own finances in the way they see fit, and are responsible for the administration of education—school and universities—health and social services and cultural and urban development. Yet there are differences as stipulated in their Statutes and the constitution:

- Aragon, the Balearic Islands, the Basque Country, Catalonia, Galicia and Navarre have their own private law systems.
- The Basque Country, Catalonia, and Navarre have their own police corps—the Ertzaintza, the Mossos d'Esquadra and the Nafarroako Foruzaingoa, respectively. Other communities have independent but not fully developed police corps which are ascribed to the Spanish National Police.
- The Canary Islands have a special financial regime by virtue of their location outside of peninsular Spain, while the Basque Country and Navarre have a distinct financial regime by virtue of their chartered legal structure.
- The Balearic Islands, the Basque Country, Catalonia, Galicia, Navarre, and the Valencian Community have co-official languages and therefore a distinct linguistic regime.
- The Basque Country and Catalonia manage their respective commuter and regional train services.

The powers of the autonomous communities are not homogeneous.

Power	Basque Country	Galicia	Catalonia	Others
Law, Order & Justice				
Police	Partial	Partial	Partial	Partial
Public Safety (Civil protection, Firearms, gambling)	Shared	Shared	Shared	Shared
Civil & Administrative Law (Justice, Registries, Judicial Appointments)	Exclusive	Exclusive	Exclusive	Exclusive
Child & Family Protection	Exclusive	Exclusive	Exclusive	Exclusive
Consumer Protection	Exclusive	Exclusive	Exclusive	Exclusive
Data protection	Shared	Shared	Shared	
Civil registry & Statistics	Exclusive	Exclusive	Exclusive	Exclusive
Health, Welfare & Social Policy				
Social Welfare	Exclusive	Exclusive	Exclusive	Exclusive
Equality	Exclusive	Exclusive	Exclusive	AN (Exclusive)
Social Security	Shared	Shared	Shared	Shared
Employment	Shared	Shared	Shared	Shared
Health Care	Shared	Shared	Shared	Shared
Benevolent/Mutual Societies	Administrative	Administrative	Shared	AN, NA, VC (Shared)
Economy, Transport & Environment				
Public Infrastructure (Road, Highways)	Exclusive	Shared	Shared	
Public Infrastructure (Rail, Airports)	Shared	Shared	Shared	Shared
Environment (Nature, Contamination, Rivers, Weather)	Exclusive	Exclusive	Shared	Shared
Economic Planning & Development	Exclusive	Exclusive	Shared	
Advertising, Regional Markets and regional controlled origin designations	Exclusive	Exclusive	Exclusive	Exclusive
Professional associations	Exclusive	Exclusive	Exclusive	Exclusive
Workplace & Industrial safety	Partial	Partial	Partial	Partial
Financial (Regional Cooperative Banks, & Financial Markets)	Exclusive	Exclusive	Shared	Exclusive
Press & Media	Shared	Shared	Shared	Shared
Water (Local drainage Basin)	Exclusive	Exclusive	Exclusive	Exclusive
Regional Development (Coast, Housing Rural Services)	Exclusive	Exclusive	Exclusive	Exclusive
Public Sector & Cooperative Banks	Shared	Shared	Shared	Shared
Energy & Mining	Exclusive	Exclusive	Shared	Shared
Competition	Partial	Partial	Partial	Partial
Agriculture and Animal welfare	Exclusive	Exclusive	Exclusive	Exclusive
Fisheries	Shared	Shared	Shared	Shared
Hunting & Fishing	Exclusive	Exclusive	Exclusive	
Local Transport & Communications (Road Transport, Maritime Rescue)	Exclusive	Exclusive	Exclusive	Exclusive
Tourism	Exclusive	Exclusive	Exclusive	Exclusive
Culture & Education				
Culture (libraries, museums, Film industry, Arts & crafts)	Shared	Shared	Shared	Shared
Culture (Language Promotion, R & D Projects)	Shared	Shared	Exclusive	Shared
Culture (Sports, Leisure, Events)	Exclusive	Exclusive	Exclusive	Exclusive
Education (Primary, secondary, University, Professional & Language)	Exclusive	Exclusive	Exclusive	Exclusive
Religious Organizations		Shared	Exclusive	
Cultural, Welfare, & Education Associations Regulation	Exclusive	Exclusive	Exclusive	Exclusive
International Relations (Culture & language, Cross border relations)	Partial	Partial	Partial	
Resources & Spending				
Own Tax resources	Yes	Yes	Yes	Yes
Allocation by Central Government	No	Convergence Funds	Convergence Funds	Convergence Funds (except NA)
Other resources	Co-payments (Health & Education)	Co-payments (Health & Education)	Co-payments (Health & Education)	Co-payments (Health & Education)
Resources	100%	60%	60%	60%
Devolved Spending as % of total public spending	36% (Average for all autonomous communities)			

=== Degree of financial autonomy ===
How the communities are financed has been one of the most contentious aspects in their relationship with the central government. The constitution gave all communities significant control over spending, but the central government retained effective control of their revenue supply. That is, the central government is still charge of levying and collecting most taxes, which it then redistributes to the autonomous communities with the aim of producing "fiscal equalization". This applies to all communities, with the exception of the Basque Country and Navarre, which level all taxes and pay an annual quote for the public services provided by the State.

This financial scheme is known as the "common regime" and applies to the other 15 autonomous communities. In essence, fiscal equalization implies that richer communities become net contributors to the system, while poorer communities become net recipients. The two largest net contributors to the system are the Balearic Islands and the Community of Madrid, in percentage terms, or the Community of Madrid and Catalonia in absolute terms.

Central government funding is the main source of revenue for the communities of "common regime". Redistribution, or transfer payments, are given to the communities of common regime to manage the responsibilities they have assumed. The amount they receive is based upon several calculations which include a consideration for population, land area, administrative units, dispersal of population, relative poverty, fiscal pressure and insularity. The central government is committed to returning a specific percentage of taxes to all communities with common regime, within the differences allowed for fiscal equalization. The communities of common regime have the ability to add a surcharge to the so-called "ceded taxes"—taxes set at the central level, but collected locally—and they can lower or raise personal income taxes up to a limit.

The Basque Country and Navarre were granted an exception in the fiscal and financial system through the first additional disposition of the constitution that recognizes their historical "charters" (Note: "Charters" (in Spanish: fueros, in Basque: foruak).) —hence they are known as "communities of chartered regime" or "foral regime". Through their "chartered regime", these communities are allowed to levy and collect all so-called "contracted taxes", including income tax and corporate tax, and they have much more flexibility to lower or raise them. This "chartered" or "foral" contract entails true financial autonomy.

Since they collect almost all taxes, they send to the central government a pre-arranged amount known as cupo, "quota" or aportación, "contribution", and the treaty whereby this system is recognized is known as concierto, "treaty", or convenio, "pact". Hence they are also said to have concierto económico, an "economic treaty". Since they collect all taxes themselves and only send a prearranged amount to the central government for the powers exclusive to the State, they do not participate in "fiscal equalization", in that they do not receive any money back.

=== Spending ===
As more responsibilities have been assumed by the autonomous communities in areas such as social welfare, health, and education, public expenditure patterns have seen a shift from the central government towards the communities since the 1980s. In 2005, autonomous communities accounted for 35% of all public expenditure in Spain, a percentage that is even higher than that of states within a federation. With no legal constraints to balance budgets, and since the central government retains control over fiscal revenue in the communities of common regime, these are in a way encouraged to build up debt.

The Council on Fiscal and Financial Policy, which includes representatives of the central government and of the autonomous communities, has become one of the most efficient institutions of coordination in matters of public expenditures and revenue. Through the Council several agreements of financing have been agreed, as well as limits to the communities' public debt. The Organic Law of the Financing of Autonomous Communities of 1988 requires that the communities obtain the authorization of the central Ministry of Finance to issue public debt.

=== Linguistic regimes ===
Bilingual signs, showing the names of the city known as Pamplona in Spanish and Iruña in Basque

The preamble to the constitution explicitly stated that it is the nation's will to protect "all Spaniards and the peoples of Spain in the exercise of human rights, their cultures and traditions, languages and institutions". This is a significant recognition not only in that it differed drastically from the restrictive linguistic policies during the Franco era, but also because part of the distinctiveness of the "historical nationalities" lies on their own regional languages. The nation is thus openly multilingual, in which Spanish—known domestically as Castilian (castellano)—is the official language in all territories, but the "other Spanish languages" can also be official in their respective communities, in accordance with their Statutes of Autonomy.

Article 3 of the constitution ends up declaring that the "richness of the distinct linguistic modalities of Spain represents a patrimony which will be the object of special respect and protection". Spanish remains the only official language of the State; other languages are only co-official with Spanish in the communities that have so regulated. In addition, knowledge of the Spanish language was declared a right and an obligation of all Spaniards.

Spanish legislation, most notably in the Statutes of Autonomy of the bilingual communities, use the term "own language", or "language proper to a community", (Note: "Own language (of a community)" or "language proper [to a community]" (in Spanish: lengua propia, in Basque: berezko hizkuntza, in Catalan/Valencian: llengua pròpia, in Galician: lingua propia).) to refer to a language other than Spanish that originated or had historical roots in that particular territory. The Statutes of Autonomy of the respective autonomous communities have declared Basque the language proper to the Basque Country and Navarre, Catalan the language proper to Catalonia, the Balearic Islands and the Valencian Community—where it is historically, traditionally and officially known as Valencian—and Galician to be the language proper to Galicia. There are other protected regional languages in other autonomous communities. As a percentage of total population in Spain, Basque is spoken by 2%, Catalan/Valencian by 17%, and Galician by 7% of all Spaniards. A 2016 Basque Government census revealed 700,000 fluent speakers in Spain (51,000 in Basque counties in France) and 1,185,000 total when passive speakers are included.

Co-official or protected languages of Spain
Language	Status	Speakers in Spain (Note: All figures as reported on Ethnologue for the number of speakers in Spain only.)
Aragonese	Not official but recognised in Aragon	11,000
Asturleonese	Not official but recognised in Asturias and in Castile and León (Note: In the Statute of Autonomy of Castile and León, the Astur-Leonese dialect spoken therein is referred to as Leonese.)	100,000
Basque	Official in the Basque Country and Navarre	580,000
Catalan/Valencian	as Catalan, official in Catalonia and Balearic Islands and recognised in Aragon, and as Valencian, in the Valencian Community (Note: The Catalan dialect spoken in the Valencian Community is historically, traditionally and officially referred to as Valencian.)	around 10 million, including second language speakers
Galician	Official in Galicia and recognised in some municipalities in Castile and León that border Galicia	2.34 million
Occitan	Official in Catalonia	4,700
Fala	Not official but recognised as a "Bien de Interés Cultural" in Extremadura	11,000

=== Subdivisions ===
Provinces of each autonomous community
Autonomous community	Provinces (Note: The Basque provinces and Navarre are officially known as "historical territories" or "chartered territories".)
Andalusia	Almería, Cádiz, Córdoba, (Note: Also spelled "Cordova" in English.) Granada, Huelva, Jaén, Málaga and Seville
Aragon	Huesca, Teruel and Zaragoza (Note: Also spelled "Saragossa" in English.)
Asturias	(Asturias) (Note: Previously known as Oviedo.)
Balearic Islands	(Balearic Islands)
Basque Country	Álava, Biscay, and Gipuzkoa
Canary Islands	Las Palmas and Santa Cruz de Tenerife
Cantabria	(Cantabria) (Note: Previously known as Santander.)
Castilla-La Mancha	Albacete, Ciudad Real, Cuenca, Guadalajara and Toledo
Castile and León	Ávila, Burgos, León, Palencia, Salamanca, Segovia, Soria, Valladolid and Zamora
Catalonia	Barcelona, Girona, Lleida and Tarragona
Extremadura	Badajoz and Cáceres
Galicia	A Coruña, Lugo, Ourense and Pontevedra
La Rioja	(La Rioja) (Note: Previously known as Logroño.)
Madrid	(Madrid)
Murcia	(Murcia)
Navarre	(Navarre) (Note: Previously known as Pamplona.)
Valencian Community	Alicante, Castellón and Valencia

== See also ==
- Autonomous administrative division
- Autonomous Communities Administration
- Autonomous Regions of Portugal
- History of the territorial organization of Spain
- List of current presidents of the autonomous communities of Spain
- List of Spanish autonomous communities by gross domestic product
- List of Spanish autonomous communities by Human Development Index
- Manuel Clavero
- National and regional identity in Spain
- Political divisions of Spain
- President (Autonomous community)
- Composition of the Spanish autonomous parliaments
- Ranked lists of Spanish autonomous communities
- Singular population entity
