= First-level NUTS of the European Union =

Large administrative regions

The Classification of Territorial Units for Statistics (NUTS, for the French nomenclature d'unités territoriales statistiques) is a geocode standard for referencing the administrative divisions of countries for statistical purposes. The standard was developed by the European Union.

There are three levels of NUTS defined, with two levels of local administrative units (LAUs). Depending on their size, not all countries have every level of division. One of the most extreme cases is Luxembourg, which has only LAUs; the three NUTS divisions each correspond to the entire country itself.

There are 92 first-level NUTS regions of the European Union, and 240 second-level NUTS regions.

Contents

Austria – Belgium – Bulgaria – Cyprus – Czech Republic – Germany – Denmark – Estonia
Spain – Finland – France – Greece – Croatia – Hungary – Ireland – Italy – Lithuania – Luxembourg – Latvia
Malta – Netherlands – Poland – Portugal – Romania – Sweden – Slovenia – Slovakia
See also – References

Code	Name	Corresponding second-level NUTS	Map
AT	Austria		
AT1	East Austria	Burgenland, Lower Austria, Vienna	
AT2	South Austria	Carinthia, Styria	
AT3	West Austria	Upper Austria, Salzburg, Tyrol, Vorarlberg	
BE	Belgium		
BE1	Brussels Capital Region	Brussels Capital Region	
BE2	Flemish Region	Antwerp, Limburg, East Flanders, Flemish Brabant, West Flanders	
BE3	Walloon Region	Walloon Brabant, Hainaut, Liège, Luxembourg, Namur	
BG	Bulgaria		
BG3	Northern and Eastern Bulgaria	Severozapaden, Severen tsentralen, Severoiztochen, Yugoiztochen	
BG4	South-Western and South-Central Bulgaria	Yugozapaden, Yuzhen tsentralen	
CY	Cyprus		
CY0	Cyprus	Cyprus	
CZ	Czech Republic		
CZ0	Czech Republic	Prague, Central Bohemia, Southwest, Northwest, Northeast, Southeast, Central Moravia, Moravia-Silesia	
DE	Germany		
DE1	Baden-Württemberg	Stuttgart, Karlsruhe, Freiburg, Tübingen	
DE2	Bavaria	Upper Bavaria, Lower Bavaria, Upper Palatinate, Upper Franconia, Middle Franconia, Lower Franconia, Swabia	
DE3	Berlin	Berlin	
DE4	Brandenburg	Brandenburg	
DE5	Free Hanseatic City of Bremen	Free Hanseatic City of Bremen	
DE6	Hamburg	Hamburg	
DE7	Hessen	Darmstadt, Gießen, Kassel	
DE8	Mecklenburg-Vorpommern	Mecklenburg-Vorpommern	
DE9	Lower Saxony	Braunschweig, Hanover, Lüneburg, Weser-Ems	
DEA	North Rhine-Westphalia	Düsseldorf, Cologne, Münster, Detmold, Arnsberg	
DEB	Rhineland-Palatinate	Koblenz, Trier, Rheinhessen-Pfalz	
DEC	Saarland	Saarland	
DED	Saxony	Chemnitz, Dresden, Leipzig	
DEE	Saxony-Anhalt	Saxony-Anhalt	
DEF	Schleswig-Holstein	Schleswig-Holstein	
DEG	Thuringia	Thuringia	
DK	Denmark		
DK0	Denmark	Hovedstaden, Zealand, Region of Southern Denmark, Central Jutland, North Jutland	
EE	Estonia		
EE0	Estonia	Estonia	
EL	Greece		
EL3	Attica	Attica	
EL4	Nisia Aigaiou, Kriti	North Aegean, South Aegean, Crete	
EL5	Voreia Ellada	Eastern Macedonia and Thrace, Central Macedonia, Western Macedonia, Epirus	
EL6	Kentriki Ellada	Thessaly, Ionian Islands, Western Greece, Central Greece, Peloponnese	
ES	Spain		
ES1	North West	Galicia, Asturias, Cantabria	
ES2	North East	Basque Community, Navarre, La Rioja, Aragon	
ES3	Community of Madrid	Community of Madrid	
ES4	Centre	Castile and León, Castile-La Mancha, Extremadura	
ES5	East	Catalonia, Valencian Community, Balearic Islands	
ES6	South	Andalusia, Region of Murcia, Ceuta, Melilla	
ES7	Canary Islands	Canary Islands	
FI	Finland		
FI1	Mainland Finland	East Finland, South Finland, West Finland, North Finland	
FI2	Åland	Åland	
FR	France		
FR1	Île-de-France	Île-de-France	
FRB	Centre-Val de Loire	Centre-Val de Loire	
FRC	Bourgogne-Franche-Comté	Bourgogne, Franche-Comté	
FRD	Normandy	Lower Normandy, Upper Normandy	
FRE	Hauts-de-France	Nord-Pas-de-Calais, Picardy	
FRF	Grand-Est	Alsace, Champagne-Ardenne, Lorraine	
FRG	Pays de la Loire	Pays de la Loire	
FRH	Brittany	Brittany	
FRI	Nouvelle-Aquitaine	Aquitaine, Limousin, Poitou-Charentes	
FRJ	Occitanie	Languedoc-Roussillon, Midi-Pyrénées	
FRK	Auvergne-Rhône-Alpes	Auvergne, Rhône-Alpes	
FRL	Provence-Alpes-Côte d’Azur	Provence-Alpes-Côte d’Azur	
FRM	Corsica	Corsica	
FRY	Départements d'Outre Mer	French Guiana, Guadeloupe (including Saint Martin), Martinique, Mayotte, La Réunion	
HR	Croatia		
HR0	Croatia	Pannonian Croatia, Adriatic Croatia, City of Zagreb, Northern Croatia	
HU	Hungary		
HU1	Central Hungary	Central Hungary	
HU2	Transdanubia	Central Transdanubia, Western Transdanubia, Southern Transdanubia	
HU3	Great Plain and North	Northern Hungary, Northern Great Plain, Southern Great Plain	
IE	Ireland		
IE0	Ireland	Eastern and Midland Region, Northern and Western Region and Southern Region	
IT	Italy		
ITC	North West	Aosta Valley, Liguria, Lombardy, Piedmont	
ITH	North East	Emilia-Romagna, Friuli-Venezia Giulia, Trentino-Alto Adige/Südtirol, Veneto	
ITI	Centre	Lazio, Marche, Tuscany, Umbria	
ITF	South	Abruzzo, Apulia, Basilicata, Calabria, Campania, Molise	
ITG	Islands	Sardinia, Sicily	
LT	Lithuania		
LT0	Lithuania	Capital Region, Central and Western Lithuania Region	
LU	Luxembourg		
LU0	Luxembourg	Luxembourg	
LV	Latvia		
LV0	Latvia	Latvia	
MT	Malta		
MT0	Malta	Malta	
NL	Netherlands		
NL1	North Netherlands	Groningen, Friesland, Drenthe	
NL2	East Netherlands	Overijssel, Gelderland, Flevoland	
NL3	West Netherlands	Utrecht, North Holland, South Holland, Zeeland	
NL4	South Netherlands	North Brabant, Limburg	
PL	Poland		
PL2	South Macroregion	Lesser Poland, Silesian	
PL4	North-west Macroregion	Greater Poland, Lubusz, West Pomeranian	
PL5	South-west Macroregion	Lower Silesian, Opole	
PL6	North Macroregion	Kuyavian-Pomeranian, Pomeranian, Warmian-Masurian	
PL7	Central Macroregion	Holy Cross, Łódź	
PL8	East Macroregion	Lublin, Podlaskie, Subcarpathian	
PL9	Masovian Macroregion	Masovian Regional, Warsaw Capital	
PT	Portugal		
PT1	Continental Portugal	Norte, Algarve, Centro, Lisbon, Alentejo	
PT2	Azores	Azores	
PT3	Madeira	Madeira	
RO	Romania		
RO1	Macroregion One	Nord-Vest, Centru	
RO2	Macroregion Two	Nord-Est, Sud-Est	
RO3	Macroregion Three	Sud – Muntenia, București – Ilfov	
RO4	Macroregion Four	Sud-Vest Oltenia, Vest	
SE	Sweden		
SE1	East Sweden	Stockholm County, East Middle Sweden	
SE2	South Sweden	Småland and the islands, South Sweden, West Sweden	
SE3	North Sweden	North Middle Sweden, Middle Norrland, Upper Norrland	
SI	Slovenia		
SI0	Slovenia	Eastern Slovenia, Western Slovenia	
SK	Slovakia		
SK0	Slovakia	Bratislava Region, Western Slovakia, Central Slovakia, Eastern Slovakia	

== Former member states ==
Below are the first-level NUTS regions of former member states of the European Union.

Code	Name	Corresponding second-level NUTS	Map
UK	United Kingdom		
UKC	North East	Tees Valley & Durham, Northumberland & Tyne and Wear	
UKD	North West	Cumbria, Cheshire, Greater Manchester, Lancashire, Merseyside	
UKE	Yorkshire and the Humber	East Yorkshire & Northern Lincolnshire (Humberside), North Yorkshire, South Yorkshire, West Yorkshire	
UKF	East Midlands	Derbyshire, Nottinghamshire, Leicestershire, Rutland, Northamptonshire, Lincolnshire	
UKG	West Midlands	Herefordshire, Worcestershire, Warwickshire, Shropshire, Staffordshire, West Midlands	
UKH	East of England	East Anglia (Cambridgeshire, Norfolk and Suffolk), Bedfordshire, Hertfordshire, Essex	
UKI	Greater London	Inner London – West, Inner London – East, Outer London – East and North East, Outer London – South, Outer London – West and North West	
UKJ	South East	Berkshire, Buckinghamshire, Oxfordshire, Surrey, East Sussex, West Sussex, Hampshire, Isle of Wight, Kent	
UKK	South West	Gloucestershire, Wiltshire, Bristol, Dorset, Somerset, Devon, Cornwall and Isles of Scilly	
UKL	Wales	West Wales, The Valleys, East Wales	
UKM	Scotland	Eastern Scotland, South Western Scotland, North Eastern Scotland, Highlands and Islands	
UKN	Northern Ireland	Northern Ireland	

== EFTA member states ==
Below are the first-level NUTS regions of EFTA.

Code	Name	Corresponding second-level NUTS	Map
CH	Switzerland		
CH0	Switzerland	Lake Geneva region, Espace Mittelland, Northwestern Switzerland, Canton of Zürich, Eastern Switzerland, Central Switzerland, Canton of Ticino	
IS	Iceland		
IS0	Iceland	Iceland	
LI	Liechtenstein		
LI0	Liechtenstein	Liechtenstein	
NO	Norway		
NO0	Norway	Oslo og Akershus, Innlandet, Sør-Østlandet, Agder og Rogaland, Vestlandet, Trøndelag, Nord-Norge	

== EU candidates ==
Below are the first-level NUTS regions of candidates of the European Union.

Code	Name	Corresponding second-level NUTS	Map
AL	Albania		
AL0	Albania	Northern Albania, Central Albania, Southern Albania	
MD	Moldova		
MD1	Moldova	Western part (the right side of Dniester) and Eastern part (left side of Dniester).	
ME	Montenegro		
ME0	Montenegro	Montenegro	
MK	North Macedonia		
MK0	North Macedonia	North Macedonia	
TR	Turkey		
TR1	Istanbul Region	Istanbul Subregion	
TR2	West Marmara Region	Balıkesir Subregion, Tekirdağ Subregion	
TR3	Aegean Region	Aydın Subregion, Izmir Subregion, Manisa Subregion	
TR4	East Marmara Region	Bursa Subregion, Kocaeli Subregion	
TR5	West Anatolia Region	Ankara Subregion, Konya Subregion	
TR6	Mediterranean Region	Adana Subregion, Antalya Subregion, Hatay Subregion	
TR7	Central Anatolia Region	Kayseri Subregion, Kırıkkale Subregion	
TR8	West Black Sea Region	Kastamonu Subregion, Samsun Subregion, Zonguldak Subregion	
TR9	East Black Sea Region	Trabzon Subregion	
TRA	Northeast Anatolia Region	Ağrı Subregion, Erzurum Subregion	
TRB	Central East Anatolia Region	Malatya Subregion, Van Subregion	
TRC	Southeast Anatolia Region	Gaziantep Subregion, Mardin Subregion, Şanlıurfa Subregion	

== See also ==
- Local government
- Regional policy of the European Union
- Region (Europe)
