= Economy of the European Union =

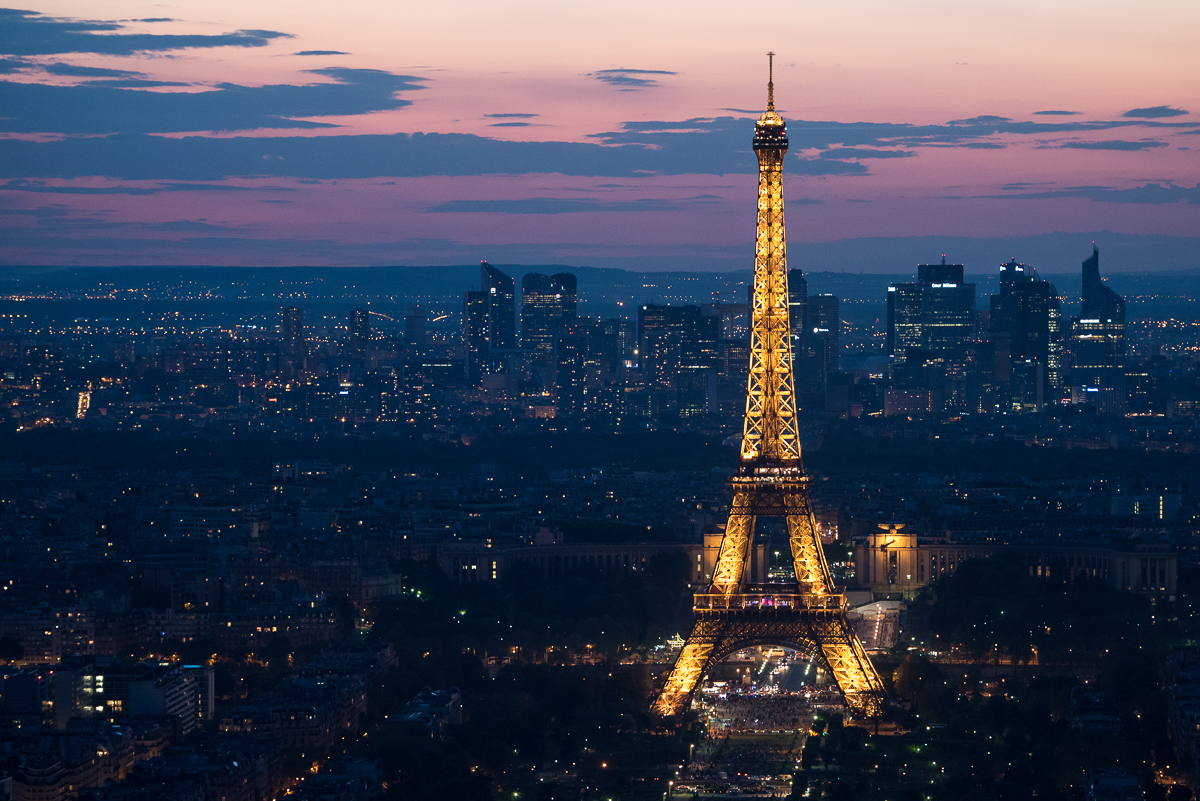
- The Paris metropolitan area is the largest metropolitan area in the EU both in terms of population and GDP.
- Currency: Euro (EUR, €) and 6 others
- Fiscal year: Calendar year
- Trade organisations: WTO, G20, G7 and others
- Country group: Developed/Advanced; High-income economy; Welfare state

Statistics
- Population: ▲451,990,314 (EU27, 2026 est.)
- GDP: ▲$22.81 trillion (nominal; 2026); ▲$30.93 trillion (PPP; 2026)
- GDP rank: 2nd (nominal; 2026); 3rd (PPP; 2026)
- GDP growth: 1.4% (2026); 1.4% (2027); 1.5% (2028)
- GDP per capita: ▲$50,521 (nominal; 2026); ▲$68,514 (PPP; 2026)
- GDP per capita rank: 27th (nominal; 2026); 28th (PPP; 2026)
- GDP per capita growth: ▲1.3% (2025)
- GDP by sector: Agriculture: 1.6%; Industry: 22.1%; Services: 65.9%; (2025)
- Inflation (CPI): ▲3.1% (2026f); ▼2.8% (2027f); 2.4% (2028f)
- Population below national poverty line: ▼20.9% at risk of poverty or social exclusion (AROPE for EU27, 2025)
- Gini coefficient: ▼29.2 low (EU27, 2025)
- Human Development Index: ▲0.915 (Note: average of all EU member states) very high HDI (2023); ▲0.842 very high IHDI (2023)
- Labour force: ▲222,174,000 (EU27, 2026 Q2); ▲176,766,000 (EA21, 2026 Q2); ▲66.1% employment rate (EU27, 2026 Q2); ▲66.2% employment rate (EA21, 2026 Q2)
- Labour force by occupation: Agriculture: 5%; Industry: 21.9%; Services: 73.1%; (2014 est.)
- Unemployment: 5.9% (EU27, May 2026); 6.2% (EA21, May 2026)
- Youth unemployment: ▲15.2% (Note: less than 25 years) (EU27, May 2026)
- Average gross salary: €3,255 monthly (2022)
- Average net salary: €2,496 monthly (2025)
- Main industries: Ferrous; non-ferrous metal; metal products; petroleum; coal; cement; chemicals; pharmaceuticals; aerospace; railway equipment; automobile; construction equipment; industrial equipment; shipbuilding; electrical equipment; machine tools; automated systems; electronics; telecommunications equipment; fishing; food and beverages; furniture; paper; textiles

External
- Exports: ▲€2.644 trillion (2025)
- Export goods: Machinery, motor vehicles, pharmaceuticals and other chemicals, fuels, aircraft, plastics, iron and steel, wood pulp and paper products, alcoholic beverages, furniture
- Main export partners: United States 21.0%; United Kingdom 13.1%; EFTA 11.0%; Switzerland 8.3%; Norway 2.4%; Other countries 0.3%; China (Note: except Hong Kong) 7.5%; Turkey 4.3%; ASEAN 3.6%; Singapore 1.1%; Other countries 2.5%; (2025)
- Imports: ▲€2.514 trillion (2025)
- Import goods: Fuels and crude oil, machinery, vehicles, pharmaceuticals and other chemicals, precious gemstones, textiles, aircraft, plastics, metals, ships
- Main import partners: China 22.3%; United States 14.1%; EFTA 9.7%; Switzerland 5.7%; Norway 3.8%; Other countries 0.2%; ASEAN 7.1%; Viet Nam 2.5%; Malaysia 1.2%; Thailand 1.2%; Other countries 2.6%; United Kingdom 6.3%; Turkey 4.1%; (2025)
- FDI stock: ▼€14.586 trillion (inward, 2024); ▼€17.404 trillion (outward, 2024)
- Current account: ▲€461.193 billion (2024); ▲2.6% of GDP (2024)
- Gross external debt: $13.05 trillion (31 December 2014 est.)
- Net international investment position: ▲ −€2,557.4 billion; 17.5% of GDP (2015)

Public finance
- Government debt: ▲87.8% of GDP (2026)
- Foreign reserves: $0.6 trillion (2010)
- Budget balance: €675.8 billion deficit (EU27; 2021); −4.7% of GDP (2021)
- Revenue: 46.9% of GDP (EU27; 2021)
- Spending: 51.6% of GDP (EU27; 2021)
- Economic aid: donor: ODA, $87.64 billion
- Credit rating: Standard & Poor's: AA; Outlook: Stable; Moody's: AAA; Outlook: Stable; Fitch: AAA; Outlook: Stable; Scope: AAA; Outlook: Stable
- All values, unless otherwise stated, are in US dollars.

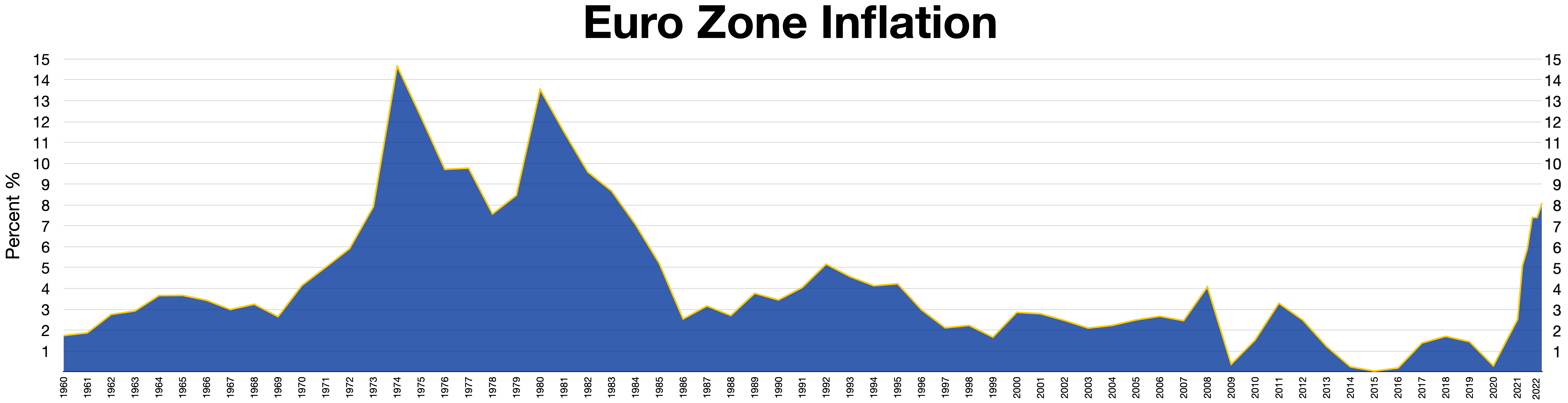
Eurozone's inflation

The European Union's economy combines the national economies of the supranational organization's member states. It makes up the majority of the European economy as the second largest economy in the world in nominal terms, after the United States. By purchasing power parity (PPP), the EU economy is the third-largest and generates one-sixth of global economic output. Within the EU, Germany, France, Italy and Spain are the four largest economies. The EU economy consists of an internal market of mixed economies based on free market and advanced social models.

The EU is one of the world's largest trading entities, with Germany and France serving as the primary economic powerhouses in terms of both exports and imports. The EU's largest trading partners are China, the U.S., the United Kingdom, Switzerland, and Russia. Most EU states operate within the Eurozone – using the euro – the second largest and second most-traded reserve currency in the world after the United States dollar. The EU banking system totals more than $38 trillion while managed assets exceed $12 trillion as of 2020. The two largest stock exchanges are Euronext Paris and Frankfurt Stock Exchange.

The distributions of economic output and wealth across the EU varies across the region. Economic output per capita in the EU varies significantly, particularly between Western and Eastern Europe. Paris is by far the economically strongest city in the EU, with a GDP exceeding $1 trillion. In 2024, the social welfare expenditure of the European Union (EU) as a whole was 27.3% of its GDP. In 2026, public debt within the EU stood at 81.7% of GDP, with large disparities between the lowest rate, Estonia, with 24.1%, and the highest, Greece, with 146.1%.

== Currency ==
The Eurozone or euro area (dark blue) represents around 350 million people. The euro is the second-largest reserve currency in the world.

Since 1999, 21 EU states use the euro as official currency in a currency union. The remaining 6 states continue to use their own currency with the possibility to join the euro later. The euro is the most widely used currency in the EU.

Since 1992, the Maastricht Treaty sets out rigid economic and fiscal convergence criteria for the states joining the euro. Starting 1997, the Stability and Growth Pact has been started to ensure continuing economic and fiscal stability and convergence.

Denmark is not a part of the eurozone due to its special opt-outs concerning the later joining of the euro. In contrast, the remaining states can effectively opt out by choosing when or whether to join the European Exchange Rate Mechanism, which is the preliminary step towards joining. They are, however, committed to join the euro by their Treaties of Accession.

Starting with Greece in 2009, five of the 20 eurozone states had been struggling with a sovereign debt crisis, commonly called the European debt crisis. All these states started reforms and got bailout packages (Greece, Ireland, Portugal, Spain, Cyprus). By the late 2010s, all five countries had exited their bailout programs and moved out of the acute phase of the debt crisis. Other non-eurozone states also experienced a debt crisis and also went through successful bailout programmes, i.e. Hungary, Romania and Latvia (the latter before it joined the eurozone).

== Budget ==
The EU has a long-term budget, named Multiannual Financial Framework (MFF), of €1,082.5 billion for the period 2014–2020, representing 1.02% of the EU-28's GNI.

The overall budget for the period 2021-2027 is of €1.8 trillion combining the MFF of €1,074.3 billion with an extraordinary recovery fund of €750 billion, known as Next Generation EU, to support member states hit by the COVID-19 pandemic.

== Sectors ==
=== Services ===
The services sector is by far the most important sector in the European Union, making up 64.7% of GDP, compared to the manufacturing industry with 23.8% of GDP and agriculture with only 1.5% of GDP.

Financial services are well developed within the Single Market of the Union. Companies have a greater reliance on bank lending than in the United States, although a shift towards companies raising more funding through capital markets is planned through the CMU initiative, the EU plan put forward by the Commission in September 2015 to mobilise the free movement of capital within the EU. The plan aims "to establish the building blocks of an integrated capital market in the EU by 2019". The CMU initiative comprises 33 measures in all. The plan was updated in 2017 and in 2019, since not a single legislation will deliver the CMU. The Commissioner for Financial Stability, Financial Services and Capital Markets Union, Mairead McGuinness, former vice-president of the European Parliament, is responsible for delivery of the initiative.

According to the Global Financial Centres Index, the two largest financial centres in Europe, London and Zürich, are outside the European Union. The two largest financial centres remaining within the EU will then be Frankfurt and Luxembourg.

In the European Investment Bank's Investment survey 2021, 58% of firms in the service sector were expecting long term effects of COVID-19. 56% of EU enterprises received governmental help to handle the pandemic's effects.

The COVID-19 pandemic had a significant effect on sales. 49% of all EU enterprises claimed that their sales decreased since the start of 2020. The pandemic has affected sectors differently, with the number of enterprises losing money in the hotels, restaurants, arts, and leisure industries reaching roughly 25% compared to previous times, and transportation also being affected.

Without government assistance, 35% of European small and medium-sized firms (SMEs) in manufacturing and services indicated their businesses would not have survived the effects of the pandemic.

In 2020, 86% of enterprises reported previous-year investment activity, while in 2021 only 79% reported investment. 23% of EU firms changed their investment plans in 2021, with only 3% reporting a higher amount. The highest proportion of enterprises that have reduced their investment plans due to a drop in sales are in Poland, where 49% of firms have reduced investment, and in Belgium, where 47% of firms stated the same.

Most green or digital businesses in the EU operate in manufacturing (33%) or infrastructure (30%). The service sector has the greatest percentage of businesses that have not engaged in digitalisation or the green transition (41%).

EU enterprises were growing in terms of innovation in 2023. 39% of EU enterprises created or introduced new goods, processes, or services in the previous fiscal year, compared to 57% of US firms. In the EU, over 12% of businesses introduced ideas that were novel to the country or the global market. Investment in intangible assets (research and development, software, training, or business processes) by EU enterprises accounted for around 38% of overall investment. Businesses in the EU were also optimistic about 2023, with 14% more predicting an increase rather than a drop in investment.

=== Agriculture ===
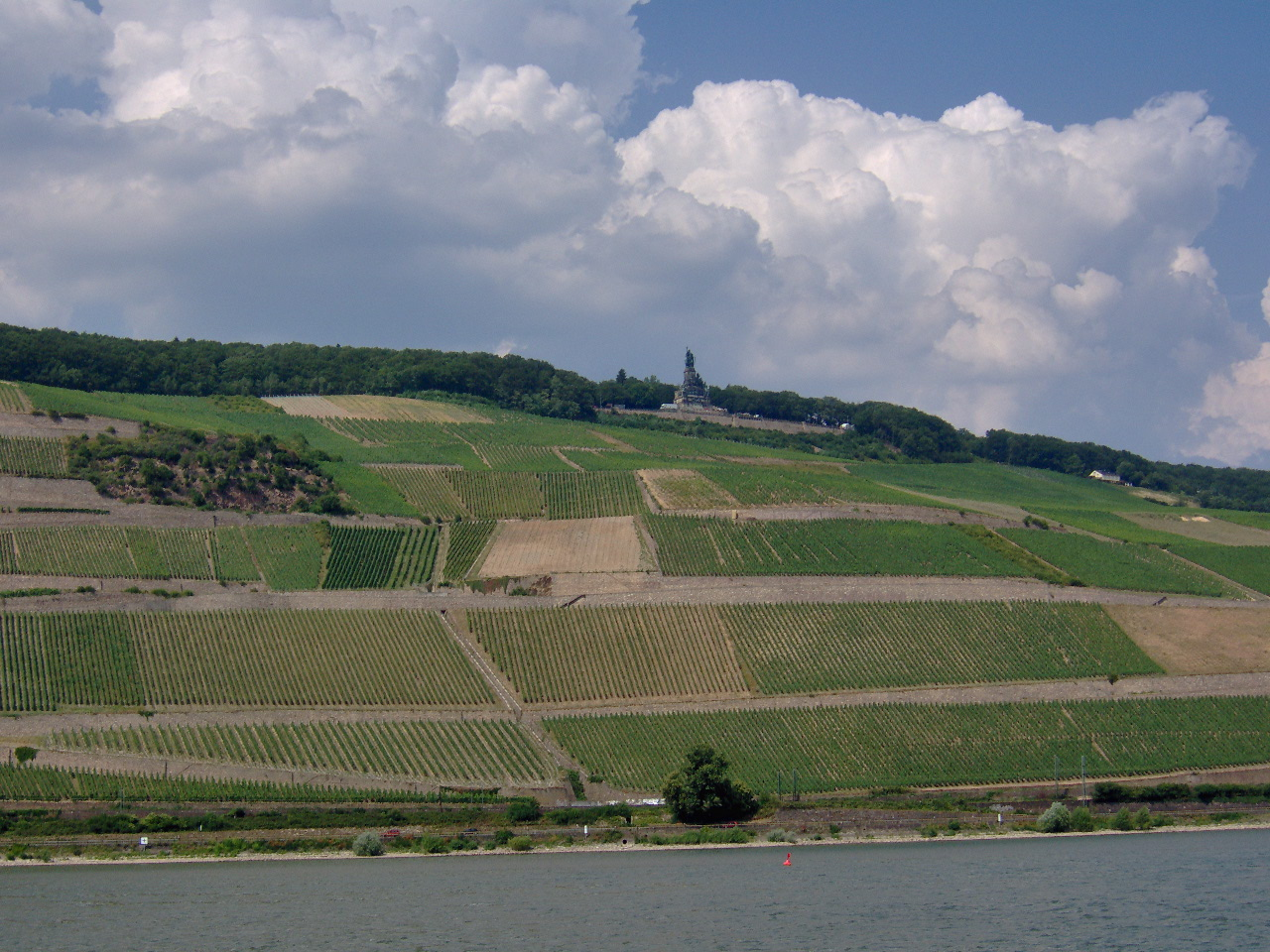
German wine region Rheingau. Germany is the EU´s second-largest agriculture goods exporter and the fourth-largest worldwide.

The agricultural sector is supported by subsidies from the European Union in the form of the Common Agricultural Policy (CAP). By 2023, CAP expenditure accounted for about 24.6% of the total EU expenditure. The CAP was used originally to guarantee a minimum price for farmers in the EU. This is criticised as a form of protectionism, inhibiting trade, and damaging developing countries; one of the most vocal opponents was the United Kingdom, the second largest economy within the union until its withdrawal in January 2020, which repeatedly refused to give up the annual UK rebate unless the CAP should undergo significant reform; France, the biggest beneficiary of the CAP and the union's third largest (now its second-largest) economy, is its most vocal proponent. The CAP is however witnessing substantial reform. In 1985, around 70% of the EU budget was spent on agriculture. In 2011, direct aid to farmers and market-related expenditure amount to just 30% of the budget, and rural development spending to 11%. By 2011, 90% of direct support had become non-trade-distorting (not linked to production) as reforms have continued to be made to the CAP, its funding and its design.

=== Tourism ===
The European Union is a major tourist destination, attracting visitors from outside of the Union and citizens travelling inside it. Internal tourism is made more convenient by the Schengen treaty and the euro. All citizens of the European Union are entitled to travel to any member state without the need of a visa.

France is the world's number one tourist destination for international visitors, followed by Spain, Italy, and Germany. It is worth noting, however, that a significant proportion of international visitors to EU countries are from other member states.

=== Energy ===
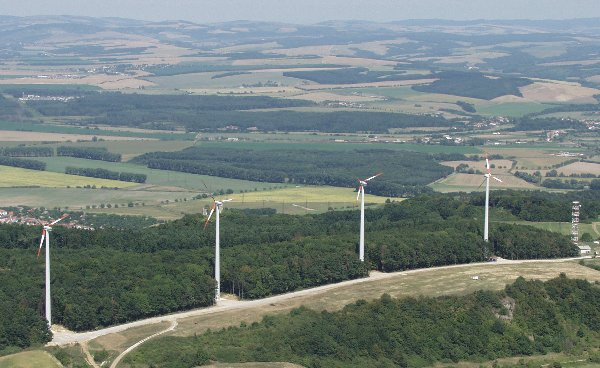
Wind power stations in Cerová, Slovakia

The European Union has uranium, coal, oil, and natural gas reserves. There are six oil producers in the European Union, primarily in North Sea oilfields. The United Kingdom, whilst it was a member of the European Union was by far the largest producer; Denmark, Germany, Italy, Romania and the Netherlands produce oil. The European Union produced 19.8 million tonnes of oil equivalent (Mtoe) of crude oil in 2019.

The EU is one of the largest consumers of oil, consuming much more than it can produce. It consumed about 350 Mtoe in 2019, importing 96.8% of the oil. The largest suppliers are Russia, Iraq, Nigeria, Saudi Arabia, Kazakhstan, and Norway. Transport is the largest consumer of oil, at 66.1% in 2019. All countries in the EU have committed to the Kyoto Protocol, and the European Union is one of its biggest proponents. The European Commission published proposals for the first comprehensive EU energy policy on 10 January 2007.

During the green transition, workers in carbon-intensive industries are more likely to lose their jobs. In the years to come, the transition to a carbon-neutral economy will put more jobs at danger in regions with higher percentages of employment in carbon-intensive industries. Employment opportunities by the green transition are associated with the use of renewable energy sources or building activity for infrastructure improvements and renovations.

Energy costs remain a major obstacle to investment to 46% of EU firms. 34% of EU firms say that stricter climate standards and regulations will affect their business over the next five years. This is compared to 42% of US firms. 27% of companies in the European Union see sustainability and the green transition as a business opportunity.

According to the Financial Times, Europe may be at risk of a new energy crisis and a significant increase in gas and oil prices in the event of an escalation of the war with Iran.

Eurostat reported on 22 September 2026 that fuel and lubricant prices for personal transport in the EU rose by 23.8% in August 2026 compared with August 2025. On a month-on-month basis, diesel prices increased by 8.3% and petrol prices by 3.3% in August 2026 relative to July. Between July and August 2026, diesel prices rose in 26 of the 27 EU member states.

== Companies ==
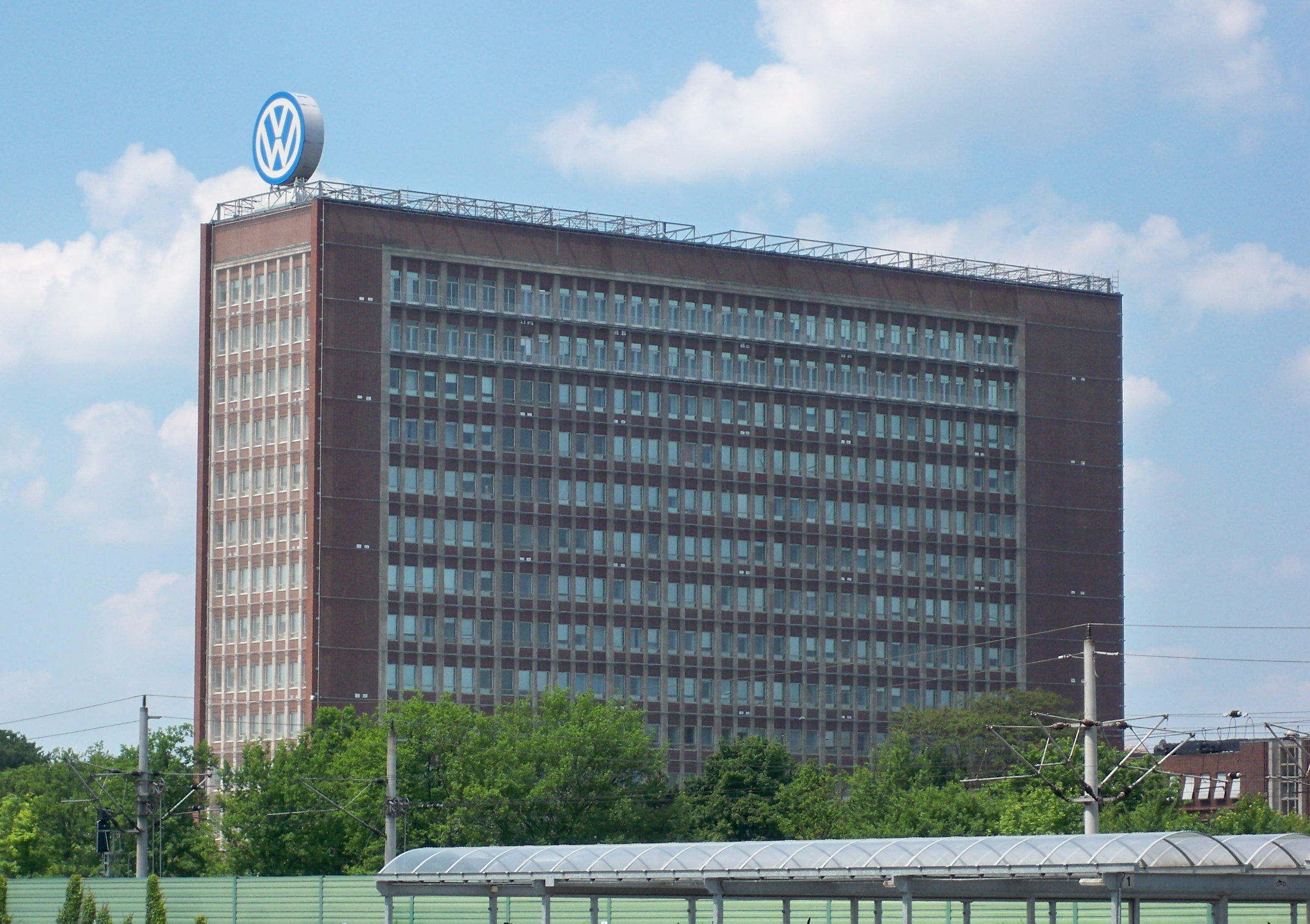
Volkswagen is the largest company in the European Union and the largest car manufacturer in the world by revenue.

The European Union's member states are the birthplace of many of the world's largest leading multinational companies, and home to its global headquarters. Among these are distinguished companies ranked first in the world within their industry/sector, like Allianz and AXA, which are the two largest financial service providers in the world by revenue; Publicis is one of the world's 'Big Three' advertising companies; Amorim, which is the world's largest cork-processing and cork producer company; ArcelorMittal, which is the largest steel company in the world; Christian Dior SE which is the biggest fashion group in the world and Inditex is the world's second biggest fashion group; Groupe Danone, which has the world leadership in the dairy products market.

Of the top 500 largest corporations measured by revenue (Fortune Global 500 in 2023), 161 are located in the EU. With 30 companies that are part of the world's biggest 500 companies, Germany was in 2023 the most represented in the European Union in the 2023 Fortune Global 500, ahead of France (24 companies) and the Netherlands (10). With 62 companies that are part of the world's biggest 2000 companies, France was again in 2023 the most represented in the European Union in the 2023 Forbes Global 2000, ahead of Germany (50 companies) and Italy (28).

Anheuser-Busch InBev is the largest beer company in the world; L'Oréal Group, which is the world's largest cosmetics and beauty company; LVMH, which is the world's largest luxury goods conglomerate; Nokia Corporation, which was the world's largest manufacturer of mobile telephones; Électricité de France, Uniper, TotalEnergies, Eni which are some of the largest energy corporations in the world; and Stora Enso, which is the world's largest pulp and paper manufacturer in terms of production capacity, in terms of banking and finance the EU has some of the world's largest notably BNP Paribas, HSBC, Crédit Agricole, Grupo Santander, Société Générale, Deutsche Bank, Sparkassen-Finanzgruppe and Groupe BPCE, the largest bank in Europe in terms of Market Capitalisation and assets.

Many other European companies rank among the world's largest companies in terms of turnover, profit, market share, number of employees or other major indicators. A considerable number of EU-based companies are ranked among the world's top-ten within their sector of activity. Europe is also home to many prestigious car companies such as Alpine, BMW, Bugatti, Ferrari, Lamborghini, Maserati, Mercedes-Benz, Porsche, Volvo, as well as volume manufacturers such as Automobile Dacia, Citroën, Fiat, Opel, Peugeot, Renault, Seat, Škoda, Volkswagen and more.

In Europe, 33% of jobs are within enterprises that have not digitally transformed. These companies were also less likely to train their employees throughout the COVID-19 outbreak. Across the European Union, the most commonly mentioned investment barrier is the lack of trained labor. 75% of businesses in transition regions found this to be problematic. Numerous reasons, such as demographics and rising demand for skills that are less common on the market, such as those needed to support digitalization activities, might contribute to the lack of competent workers. In all areas of Europe, digital businesses have produced "better" employment with greater earnings than their non-digital counterparts. Additionally, they are more inclined to recognize and reward individuals who do well.

The EU lags significantly behind the U.S. and China in venture capital investments, with the EU capturing only 5% of global venture capital compared to 52% in the U.S. and 40% in China. Venture capital funds in the EU account for just 5% of the global total, whereas those in the United States and China secure 52% and 40%, respectively. The financing gap for EU scale-ups (companies that have achieved a valuation between $500 million and $10 billion) is significant, with companies raising 50% less capital than those in Silicon Valley. This disparity exists across industries and is unaffected by the business cycle or year of establishment.

European scale-ups face significant challenges in securing sufficient financing compared to their counterparts in the United States. Venture capital in the EU has been historically lower, amounting to only 0.3% of the EU's annual GDP. This is compared to almost 0.19% in the United States. While the EU has about 50% of the number of companies with a market valuation below $500 million compared to the United States, this share drops to 10-15% for companies with valuations between $500 million and $10 billion.

The following is a list of the largest EU based stock market listed companies in 2025. The list is ordered by revenue in millions of US Dollars and is based on the Fortune Global 500.

Fortune top 10 EU corporations by revenue (2025)
World rank	Corporation	Ticker	Revenues ($m)	Profits ($m)	Assets ($m)	Employees	Headquarters	Industry
12	Volkswagen Group	VWAGY	$351,093	$12,275	$655,317	646,501	(Germany) Wolfsburg	Motor vehicles and parts
32	TotalEnergies	TTE	$195,610	$15,758	$285,487	102,887	(France) Courbevoie	Petroleum refining
40	Stellantis	STLA	$169,653	$5,919	$214,959	248,243	(Netherlands) Hoofddorp	Motor vehicles and parts
48	Mercedes-Benz Group	MBGYY	$157,450	$11,038	$274,394	169,198	(Germany) Stuttgart	Motor vehicles and parts
49	BMW Group	BMWKY	$153,974	$7,884	$277,213	159,104	(Germany) Munich	Motor vehicles
54	BNP Paribas	BNPQY	$146,390	$12,640	$2,800,692	175,853	(France) Paris	Financial services
55	Banco Santander	SAN	$146,326	$13,598	$1,902,134	206,417	(Spain) Santander	Financial services
69	Électricité de France	—	$128,355	$12,335	$378,137	181,850	(France) Paris	Energy
72	Deutsche Telekom	DTEGY	$125,196	$12,122	$315,732	198,194	(Germany) Bonn	Telecommunications
76	Allianz	ALIZY	$123,148	$10,740	$1,081,568	156,626	(Germany) Munich	Financial services

== Economies of member states ==
=== Wealth ===
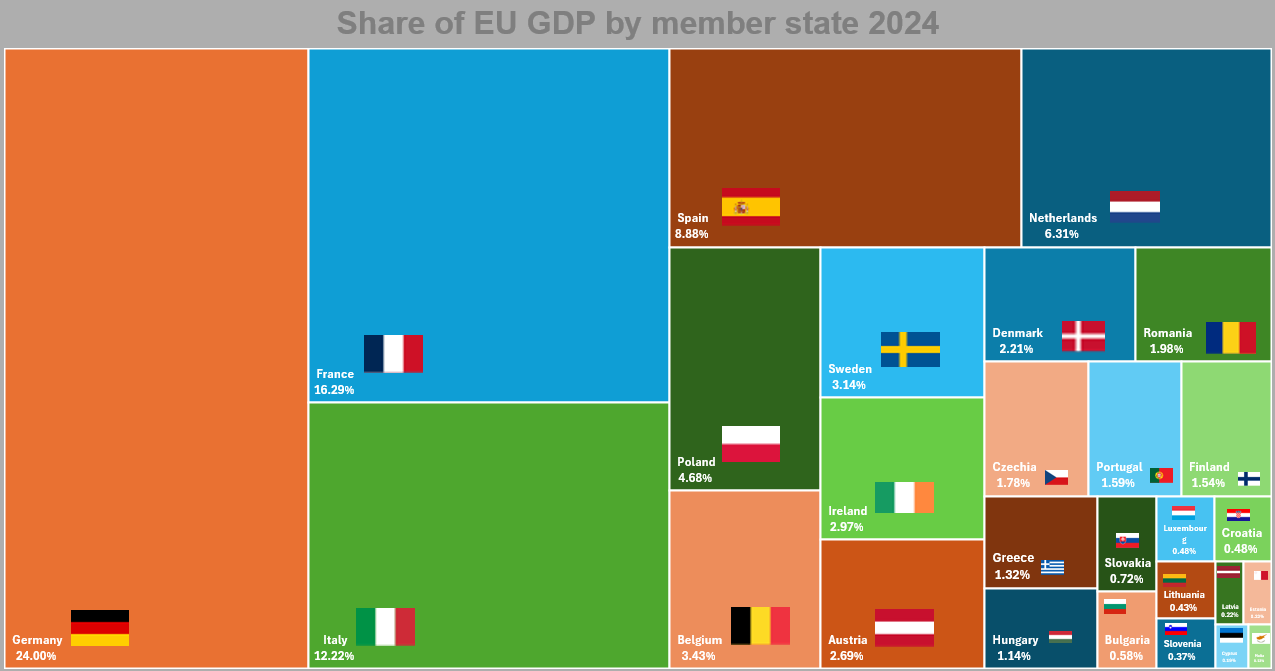
GDP share of EU countries in 2024

The twelve new member states of the European Union have enjoyed a higher average percentage growth rate than their elder members of the EU. Slovakia has the highest GDP growth in the period 2005–2015 among all countries of the European Union (See Tatra Tiger). Notably the Baltic states have achieved high GDP growth, with Latvia topping 11%, close to China, the world leader at 9% on average for the past 25 years (though these gains have been in great part cancelled by the late-2000s recession).

Reasons for this growth include government commitments to stable monetary policy, export-oriented trade policies, low flat-tax rates and the utilisation of relatively cheap labour. In 2015 Ireland had the highest GDP growth of all the states in EU (25.1%). The current map of EU growth is one of huge regional variation, with the larger economies suffering from stagnant growth and most of the newer states enjoying sustained, robust economic growth.

The European Union's financial system is characterized by a large banking sector, with bank assets comprising 300% of GDP, compared to 85% in the United States. However, the EU has relatively small capital markets, with listed equity making up only 68% of GDP compared to 170% in the United States, and a limited presence of hedge funds and private equity funds.

Approximately 26% of European scale-ups are acquired through mergers and acquisitions, a figure comparable to San Francisco but lower than the 37% observed in cities such as London.

In mid-2021, the European Union's gross saving rate was 18% of gross disposable income, higher above the prior COVID-19 pandemic average of 11–13%. In the second quarter of 2020, families' primary income fell by 7.3% compared to the second quarter of 2019, and their secondary income (from social security payments and other transfers) increased by 6.5% of gross income.

Although EU27 GDP is rising, the percentage of gross world product is steadily decreasing because of the emergence of economies such as China, India and Brazil. The EU GDP as a share of the world GDP went from a peak of 15.5% in 2019 to 14.7% in 2023.

Population and GDP per capita of European countries (2010)

==== GDP growth ====
In the tables below, colours indicate best and worst performer of the year concerned.

EU member states by real GDP growth rates
Member state	2014	2015	2016	2017	2018	2019	2020	2021	2022	2023	2024	2025	Yearly growth (2014–2024) (2015–2025)
Austria	0.8	1.3	2.1	2.3	2.5	1.8	-6.3	4.9	5.5	-0.7	-0.3	0.7	1.22
Belgium	1.8	1.5	1.2	1.5	1.9	2.4	-4.8	6.3	4.0	1.6	1.1	1.0	1.63
Bulgaria	0.9	3.4	3.0	2.7	2.3	3.8	-3.1	7.8	4.1	1.7	3.4	3.1	2.69
Croatia	-0.6	2.3	3.5	3.3	2.9	3.1	-8.3	12.6	7.3	3.8	3.8	3.4	3.10
Cyprus	-1.8	3.4	6.6	5.8	6.3	5.9	-3.2	11.4	8.7	3.6	3.9	3.8	4.53
Czech Republic	2.2	5.0	2.6	5.2	2.8	3.6	-5.3	4.0	2.8	0.0	1.3	2.6	2.23
Denmark	1.3	2.1	3.1	3.1	1.9	1.7	-1.8	6.5	0.4	1.1	3.9	3.5	2.23
Estonia	3.3	1.8	3.1	5.6	3.7	3.7	-2.9	8.3	0.7	-2.9	0.1	1.3	2.15
Finland	-0.5	0.5	2.6	3.3	1.2	1.3	-2.5	2.7	0.6	-1.2	1.0	0.8	0.82
France	1.0	1.1	0.9	2.1	1.6	2.0	-7.4	6.9	2.7	1.6	1.5	0.8	1.23
Germany	2.2	1.8	2.3	2.9	1.2	1.1	-4.0	4.0	1.9	-1.0	0.0	0.2	1.05
Greece	0.8	-0.2	0.0	1.5	2.1	2.3	-9.2	8.7	5.5	2.1	2.1	2.1	1.48
Hungary	4.3	3.7	2.4	4.1	5.6	5.1	-4.3	7.2	4.1	-0.7	0.7	0.7	2.74
Ireland	9.4	24.6	1.2	10.1	7.7	5.0	7.0	16.6	8.2	-3.3	3.6	8.0	8.18
Italy	0.0	1.0	1.5	1.7	1.0	0.6	-8.7	9.2	4.9	1.0	1.1	0.6	1.16
Latvia	2.1	3.8	2.6	3.4	4.3	0.7	-3.5	6.9	1.7	-1.0	0.5	2.4	1.99
Lithuania	3.8	2.8	2.7	4.6	4.9	4.8	0.5	5.4	1.2	2.9	3.0	3.0	3.30
Luxembourg	2.6	2.3	5.0	1.3	1.6	2.7	-0.5	6.9	-1.1	0.1	2.1	1.4	2.03
Malta	7.6	9.6	4.1	13.0	7.2	4.1	-3.5	13.3	4.1	7.1	5.3	4.7	6.38
Netherlands	1.6	2.1	2.4	2.8	2.3	2.3	-3.9	6.3	5.0	-0.6	1.1	1.6	1.92
Poland	3.9	4.4	3.0	5.2	6.2	4.6	-2.0	6.9	5.3	0.2	3.2	3.8	3.73
Portugal	0.7	1.6	2.0	3.3	2.9	2.7	-8.2	5.6	7.0	3.1	2.7	1.9	2.10
Romania	4.1	3.2	2.9	8.2	5.3	4.4	-3.4	5.9	4.9	2.5	1.1	0.8	3.33
Slovakia	2.7	5.2	1.9	2.9	4.1	2.3	-2.6	5.7	0.5	2.1	1.9	0.8	2.36
Slovenia	2.8	2.4	3.0	5.2	4.4	3.5	-4.1	8.4	2.6	2.6	2.0	1.5	2.86
Spain	1.5	4.1	2.9	2.9	2.4	2.0	-10.9	6.7	6.4	2.4	3.7	2.6	2.22
Sweden	2.3	4.4	2.1	1.9	1.8	2.6	-1.9	5.2	1.3	-0.2	2.0	1.4	1.91
European Union (27)	1.5	2.1	1.8	2.7	1.8	1.7	-6.0	6.4	3.7	0.4	1.2	1.2	1.54
Eurozone (21)	1.4	2.1	1.8	2.6	1.8	1.6	-6.0	6.4	3.6	0.4	1.3	1.4	1.53

==== Nominal GDP ====
EU member states by GDP (nominal) in billions of €
Member state	2015	2016	2017	2018	2019	2020	2021	2022	2023	2024	2025	Change from 2015 to 2025	
Member state	2015	2016	2017	2018	2019	2020	2021	2022	2023	2024	2025	Amount	%
Austria	342.084	355.666	367.295	383.234	395.707	380.318	406.232	449.382	477.837	494.088	512.813	170.729	49.91%
Belgium	415.538	428.467	443.407	459.492	479.445	463.751	506.047	561.309	602.376	620.272	641.893	226.355	54.47%
Bulgaria	45.797	48.751	52.501	56.000	61.194	61.856	71.344	86.078	94.525	104.767	116.018	70.221	153.33%
Croatia	45.488	47.574	50.204	53.035	55.768	50.718	58.390	67.609	79.186	85.905	92.671	47.183	103.73%
Cyprus	17.944	19.014	20.312	21.808	23.401	22.374	25.680	29.645	32.439	34.770	36.322	18.378	102.42%
Czech Republic	170.527	179.146	196.739	213.505	229.407	220.311	246.012	286.977	319.099	320.787	346.583	176.056	103.24%
Denmark	272.193	282.265	294.355	301.017	308.546	312.118	343.319	380.567	374.174	392.401	410.372	138.179	50.77%
Estonia	21.011	22.189	24.316	26.439	28.472	27.859	31.453	36.301	38.353	39.848	41.621	20.610	98.09%
Finland	210.192	215.717	224.706	231.905	238.518	236.387	248.764	266.135	273.005	275.993	280.570	70.378	33.48%
France	2,201.402	2,231.819	2,291.681	2,355.363	2,432.207	2,318.276	2,508.102	2,653.997	2,826.542	2,919.900	2,979.085	777.683	35.33%
Germany	3,087.030	3,195.210	3,333.110	3,434.030	3,537.280	3,450.720	3,682.340	3,989.390	4,219.310	4,328.970	4,469.910	1,382.880	44.80%
Greece	175.363	174.448	177.379	180.616	185.181	167.540	184.575	207.009	224.686	236.736	248.354	72.991	41.62%
Hungary	112.854	116.594	127.223	136.580	147.373	138.955	154.972	168.546	197.179	206.040	218.451	105.597	93.57%
Ireland	272.283	275.933	308.366	335.136	363.753	381.729	448.445	520.718	524.729	562.794	638.683	366.400	134.57%
Italy	1,663.278	1,704.857	1,744.493	1,777.744	1,804.067	1,670.012	1,842.507	1,998.073	2,142.744	2,202.031	2,258.049	594.771	35.76%
Latvia	23.744	24.498	26.017	28.153	29.567	29.224	32.284	36.089	39.564	40.652	43.026	19.282	81.21%
Lithuania	37.441	38.821	42.275	45.947	49.239	50.265	56.709	67.081	74.317	78.996	84.061	46.620	124.52%
Luxembourg	54.142	56.208	58.169	60.193	62.415	64.499	73.040	76.731	82.116	86.180	89.522	35.380	65.35%
Malta	10.221	10.864	12.536	13.679	14.594	14.362	16.682	17.985	20.925	23.137	24.577	14.356	140.46%
Netherlands	699.175	720.175	750.861	787.273	829.767	816.463	891.550	993.820	1,050.133	1,122.459	1,179.660	480.485	68.72%
Poland	432.486	427.659	469.071	503.951	538.424	531.827	583.001	661.712	751.932	848.491	918.464	485.978	112.37%
Portugal	179.393	186.381	195.509	204.998	214.490	201.033	216.494	243.957	270.353	289.784	306.765	127.372	71.00%
Romania	160.289	167.497	186.399	204.781	223.341	219.840	240.987	280.777	321.578	353.633	380.058	219.769	137.11%
Slovakia	80.376	81.622	84.960	90.276	94.548	94.321	101.892	109.960	123.539	130.208	136.754	56.378	70.15%
Slovenia	38.494	40.013	42.626	45.462	48.157	46.739	52.032	56.882	64.050	67.418	70.486	31.992	83.11%
Spain	1,087.112	1,122.967	1,170.024	1,212.276	1,253.710	1,129.214	1,235.474	1,375.863	1,497.761	1,594.330	1,687.152	600.040	55.20%
Sweden	452.337	463.919	474.838	465.753	474.203	478.107	533.954	547.190	535.177	559.073	593.698	141.361	31.25%
European Union (27)	12,308.193	12,638.272	13,169.371	13,628.647	14,122.772	13,578.815	14,792.280	16,169.785	17,257.628	18,019.662	18,801.752	6,493.559	52.76%
Eurozone (21)	10,707.507	11,001.193	11,420.746	11,803.059	12,201.479	11,677.658	12,690.035	13,844.014	14,758.490	15,339.238	15,936.611	5,229.104	48.84%

==== GDP per capita (nominal) ====
EU member states by GDP (nominal) per capita in €
Member state	2015	2016	2017	2018	2019	2020	2021	2022	2023	2024	2025	Change from 2015 to 2025	
Member state	2015	2016	2017	2018	2019	2020	2021	2022	2023	2024	2025	Amount	%
Austria	39,640	40,690	41,760	43,360	44,570	42,650	45,380	49,640	52,330	53,830	55,710	13,850	35.84%
Belgium	36,860	37,810	38,980	40,210	41,730	40,190	43,680	48,060	51,140	52,340	53,920	15,730	43.54%
Bulgaria	6,560	7,070	7,720	8,340	9,250	9,440	10,970	13,310	14,660	16,260	18,060	10,030	164.97%
Croatia	10,960	11,610	12,430	13,310	14,130	12,980	15,070	17,540	20,530	22,200	23,870	11,260	107.75%
Cyprus	20,810	21,930	23,230	24,660	26,110	24,630	27,850	31,560	33,870	35,670	36,690	14,020	69.00%
Czech Republic	16,230	17,040	18,700	20,270	21,740	20,980	23,430	26,670	29,330	29,440	31,810	15,580	96.00%
Denmark	47,900	49,270	51,060	51,950	53,040	53,540	58,640	64,430	62,910	65,650	68,310	20,410	42.61%
Estonia	16,000	16,860	18,480	20,040	21,490	20,960	23,650	27,260	28,080	28,990	30,380	13,260	85.66%
Finland	38,350	39,250	40,790	42,040	43,200	42,740	44,890	47,890	48,950	49,100	49,710	11,480	30.46%
France	33,200	33,530	34,290	35,080	36,090	34,280	36,920	38,920	41,340	42,590	43,350	10,010	30.69%
Germany	37,950	39,030	40,630	41,800	43,030	42,020	44,910	48,340	50,660	51,830	53,520	13,960	37.87%
Greece	16,210	16,190	16,490	16,830	17,270	15,660	17,350	19,570	21,300	22,480	23,570	6,400	39.60%
Hungary	11,520	11,950	13,080	14,070	15,200	14,370	16,090	17,550	20,560	21,550	22,960	10,660	98.61%
Ireland	57,980	58,060	63,960	68,530	73,230	75,820	88,070	100,140	99,080	104,510	116,770	55,900	129.52%
Italy	27,620	28,360	29,070	29,690	30,200	28,100	31,160	33,860	36,330	37,350	38,310	10,060	37.09%
Latvia	12,010	12,500	13,400	14,620	15,450	15,370	17,130	19,130	21,030	21,800	23,410	10,180	89.06%
Lithuania	12,860	13,490	14,870	16,300	17,520	17,890	20,190	23,690	25,880	27,350	29,100	14,590	117.66%
Luxembourg	95,090	96,230	97,440	98,870	100,420	102,190	113,920	117,100	122,970	127,030	130,300	34,150	36.82%
Malta	23,000	23,900	26,820	28,240	28,920	27,870	32,190	33,810	37,800	40,640	42,160	18,730	90.83%
Netherlands	41,270	42,290	43,830	45,690	47,840	46,810	50,850	56,140	58,740	62,380	65,210	22,710	56.44%
Poland	11,390	11,270	12,360	13,280	14,190	14,310	15,770	17,520	19,980	22,610	24,570	11,660	108.47%
Portugal	17,280	18,000	18,910	19,840	20,710	19,360	20,800	23,300	25,560	27,100	28,390	10,480	63.06%
Romania	8,090	8,500	9,510	10,510	11,520	11,390	12,590	14,740	16,870	18,550	19,960	11,870	146.72%
Slovakia	14,820	15,030	15,620	16,580	17,340	17,270	18,730	20,150	22,640	23,850	25,060	9,680	68.51%
Slovenia	18,660	19,380	20,630	21,940	23,050	22,230	24,690	26,970	30,200	31,700	33,060	13,410	74.17%
Spain	23,440	24,190	25,160	25,950	26,620	23,850	26,090	28,790	30,980	32,630	34,210	10,770	45.95%
Sweden	46,160	46,790	47,210	45,770	46,110	46,180	51,260	51,980	50,490	52,590	55,620	8,090	18.01%
European Union (27)	27,800	28,490	29,650	30,640	31,700	30,510	33,260	36,140	38,380	39,950	41,600	12,830	47.82%
Eurozone (21)	30,660	31,430	32,590	33,620	34,680	33,160	36,030	39,130	41,460	42,920	44,460	12,880	42.72%

==== Gini ====
EU member states by Gini coefficients
Member state	2011	2012	2013	2014	2015	2016	2017	2018	2019	2020	2021	2022
Austria	27.4	27.6	27.0	27.6	27.2	27.2	27.9	26.8	27.5	27.0	26.7	27.8
Belgium	26.3	26.5	25.9	25.9	26.2	26.3	26.1	25.7	25.1	25.4	24.1	24.9
Bulgaria	35.0	33.6	35.4	35.4	37.0	37.7	40.2	39.6	40.8	40.0	39.7	38.4
Croatia	31.2	30.9	30.9	30.2	30.4	29.8	29.9	29.7	29.2	28.3	29.2	28.5
Cyprus	29.2	31.0	32.4	34.8	33.6	32.1	30.8	29.1	31.1	29.3	29.4	29.4
Czech Republic	25.2	24.9	24.6	25.1	25.0	25.1	24.5	24.0	24.0	24.2	24.9	24.8
Denmark	26.6	26.5	26.8	27.7	27.4	27.7	27.6	27.9	27.5	27.3	27.0	27.7
Estonia	31.9	32.5	32.9	35.6	34.8	32.7	31.6	30.6	30.5	30.5	30.6	31.9
Finland	25.8	25.9	25.4	25.6	25.2	25.4	25.3	25.9	26.2	26.5	25.7	26.6
France	30.8	30.5	30.1	29.2	29.2	29.3	29.3	28.5	29.2	29.2	29.3	29.8
Germany	29.0	28.3	29.7	30.7	30.1	29.5	29.1	31.1	29.7	30.5	31.2	28.8
Greece	33.5	34.3	34.4	34.5	34.2	34.3	33.4	32.3	31.0	31.4	32.4	31.4
Hungary	26.9	27.2	28.3	28.6	28.2	28.2	28.1	28.7	28.0	28.0	27.6	27.4
Ireland	29.8	30.5	30.7	31.1	29.8	29.5	30.6	28.9	28.3	28.3	26.9	27.9
Italy	32.5	32.4	32.8	32.4	32.4	33.1	32.7	33.4	32.8	32.5	32.9	32.7
Latvia	35.1	35.7	35.2	35.5	35.4	34.5	34.5	35.6	35.2	34.5	35.7	34.3
Lithuania	33.0	32.0	34.6	35.0	37.9	37.0	37.6	36.9	35.4	35.1	35.4	36.2
Luxembourg	27.2	28.0	30.4	28.7	28.5	31.0	30.9	31.3	32.3	31.2	29.6	29.5
Malta	27.2	27.1	27.9	27.7	28.1	28.5	28.3	28.7	28.0	30.3	31.2	31.1
Netherlands	25.8	25.4	25.1	26.2	26.7	26.9	27.1	27.4	26.8	28.2	26.4	26.3
Poland	31.1	30.9	30.7	30.8	30.6	29.8	29.2	27.8	28.5	27.2	26.8	26.3
Portugal	34.2	34.5	34.2	34.5	34.0	33.9	33.5	32.1	31.9	31.2	33.0	32.0
Romania	33.5	34.0	34.6	35.0	37.4	34.7	33.1	35.1	34.8	33.8	34.3	32.0
Slovakia	25.7	25.3	24.2	26.1	23.7	24.3	23.2	20.9	22.8	20.9	21.8	21.2
Slovenia	23.8	23.7	24.4	25.0	24.5	24.4	23.7	23.4	23.9	23.5	23.0	23.1
Spain	34.0	34.2	33.7	34.7	34.6	34.5	34.1	33.2	33.0	32.1	33.0	32.0
Sweden	26.0	26.0	26.0	26.9	26.7	27.6	28.0	27.0	27.6	26.9	26.8	27.6
European Union	30.5	30.4	30.6	30.9	30.8	30.6	30.3	30.4	30.2	30.0	30.2	29.6
Eurozone	30.6	30.5	30.7	31.0	30.7	30.7	30.4	30.6	30.2	30.0	30.2	29.6

=== Labour market ===
Unemployment rate by country in the EEA in March 2019

The EU unemployment rate was 6.1% in 2023. The euro area unemployment rate was 6.6%. Among the member states, the lowest unemployment rates were recorded in the Czech Republic (2.0% in 2019), Poland (2.8% in 2023) and Germany (3.0% in 2019), and the highest in Greece (27.8% in 2013) and Spain (24.8% in 2012).

==== Unemployment rate ====
The following table shows the history of the unemployment rate for all European Union member states:

Unemployment rate by country
Member state	2009	2010	2011	2012	2013	2014	2015	2016	2017	2018	2019	2020	2021	2022	2023	2024
Austria	5.7	5.2	4.9	5.2	5.7	6.0	6.1	6.5	5.9	5.2	4.8	6.0	6.2	4.8	5.1	5.2
Belgium	8.0	8.4	7.2	7.6	8.6	8.7	8.7	7.9	7.2	6.0	5.5	5.8	6.3	5.6	5.5	5.7
Bulgaria	7.9	11.3	12.3	13.3	13.9	12.4	10.1	8.6	7.2	6.2	5.2	6.1	5.2	4.2	4.3	4.2
Croatia	9.2	11.7	13.7	16.0	17.3	17.3	16.2	13.1	11.2	8.5	6.6	7.4	7.5	6.8	6.1	5.0
Cyprus	5.4	6.3	7.9	11.9	15.9	16.1	15.0	13.0	11.1	8.4	7.1	7.6	7.2	6.3	5.8	4.9
Czech Republic	6.7	7.3	6.7	7.0	7.0	6.1	5.1	4.0	2.9	2.2	2.0	2.6	2.8	2.2	2.6	2.6
Denmark	6.4	7.7	7.8	7.8	7.4	6.9	6.3	6.0	5.8	5.1	5.0	5.6	5.1	4.5	5.1	6.2
Estonia	13.5	16.6	12.3	9.9	8.6	7.3	6.4	6.8	5.8	5.4	4.5	6.9	6.2	5.6	6.4	7.6
Finland	8.3	8.6	8.0	7.9	8.3	8.7	9.4	8.9	8.7	7.5	6.8	7.7	7.7	6.8	7.2	8.4
France	9.1	9.3	9.2	9.8	10.3	10.3	10.3	10.1	9.4	9.0	8.4	8.0	7.9	7.3	7.3	7.4
Germany	7.3	6.6	5.5	5.1	5.0	4.7	4.4	3.9	3.6	3.2	3.0	3.7	3.7	3.2	3.1	3.4
Greece	9.8	12.9	18.1	24.8	27.8	26.6	25.0	23.9	21.8	19.7	17.9	17.6	14.7	12.5	11.1	10.1
Hungary	9.7	10.8	10.7	10.7	9.8	7.5	6.6	5.0	4.0	3.6	3.3	4.1	4.0	3.6	4.1	4.5
Ireland	12.6	14.6	15.4	15.5	13.8	11.9	9.9	8.4	6.7	5.8	5.0	5.9	6.2	4.5	4.3	4.3
Italy	7.9	8.5	8.5	10.9	12.4	12.9	12.0	11.7	11.3	10.6	9.9	9.3	9.5	8.1	7.7	6.5
Latvia	17.7	19.7	16.3	15.1	11.9	10.9	9.9	9.7	8.7	7.4	6.3	8.1	7.6	6.9	6.5	6.9
Lithuania	13.8	17.8	15.4	13.4	11.8	10.7	9.1	7.9	7.1	6.2	6.3	8.5	7.1	6.0	6.9	7.1
Luxembourg	5.1	4.4	4.9	5.1	5.9	5.9	6.7	6.3	5.5	5.6	5.6	6.8	5.3	4.6	5.2	6.4
Malta	6.9	6.9	6.4	6.2	6.1	5.7	5.4	4.7	4.0	4.0	4.1	4.9	3.8	3.5	3.5	3.1
Netherlands	5.4	6.1	6.0	6.8	8.2	8.4	7.9	7.0	5.9	4.9	4.4	4.9	4.2	3.5	3.6	3.7
Poland	8.5	10.0	10.0	10.4	10.6	9.2	7.7	6.3	5.0	3.9	3.3	3.2	3.4	2.9	2.8	2.9
Portugal	11.2	12.6	13.5	16.6	17.2	14.6	13.0	11.5	9.2	7.2	6.6	7.1	6.7	6.2	6.5	6.5
Romania	8.4	9.0	9.1	8.7	9.0	8.6	8.4	7.2	6.1	5.3	4.9	6.1	5.6	5.6	5.6	5.4
Slovakia	12.0	14.3	13.5	13.9	14.1	13.1	11.5	9.6	8.1	6.5	5.7	6.7	6.8	6.1	5.8	5.3
Slovenia	5.9	7.3	8.2	8.9	10.1	9.7	9.0	8.0	6.6	5.1	4.4	5.0	4.8	4.0	3.7	3.7
Spain	17.9	19.9	21.4	24.8	26.1	24.5	22.1	19.6	17.2	15.3	14.1	15.5	14.9	13.0	12.2	11.4
Sweden	8.5	8.7	7.9	8.1	8.1	8.0	7.5	7.1	6.8	6.5	6.9	8.5	8.9	7.5	7.7	8.4
European Union	9.3	10.1	10.1	11.1	11.6	11.0	10.2	9.3	8.3	7.4	6.8	7.2	7.1	6.2	6.1	5.9

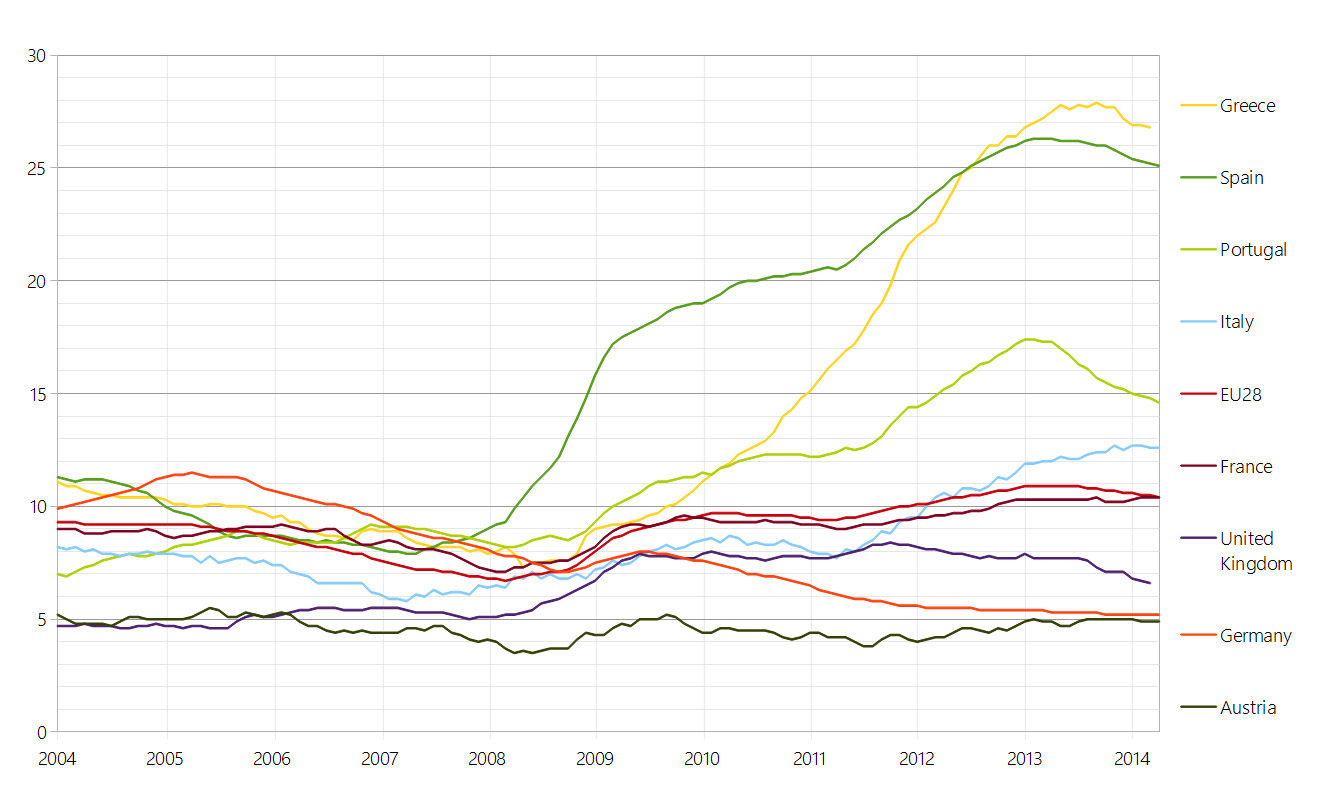
Unemployment rates in selected European countries and in the EU28 between 01/2004 and 04/2014

=== Public finance ===
Public finance (with limits according to the Maastricht criterion)
Member state	Public deficit as % of GDP (2023) (E.U. limit : –3%)	Public debt as % of GDP (2023) (E.U. limit : 60%)	HICP inflation rate (2024) Max. 3.3% (as of 1 June 2024)	Long-term interest rate (2024) Max. 4.8% (as of 1 June 2024)
Austria	-2.6	78.6	2.9	2.84
Belgium	-4.2	103.1	4.3	2.92
Bulgaria	-2.0	22.9	2.6	3.93
Croatia	-0.9	61.8	4.0	3.31
Cyprus	2.0	73.6	2.3	3.13
Czech Republic	-3.8	42.4	2.7	3.98
Denmark	3.3	33.6	1.3	2.3
Estonia	-2.8	20.2	3.7	3.55
Finland	-3.0	77.1	1.0	2.85
France	-5.5	109.9	2.3	2.97
Germany	-2.6	62.9	2.5	2.32
Greece	-1.3	163.9	3.0	3.35
Hungary	-6.7	73.4	3.7	6.5
Ireland	1.5	43.3	1.3	2.72
Italy	-7.2	134.8	1.1	3.71
Latvia	-2.4	45.0	1.3	3.29
Lithuania	-0.7	37.3	0.9	2.88
Luxembourg	-0.7	25.5	2.3	2.76
Malta	-4.5	47.4	2.4	3.37
Netherlands	-0.4	45.1	3.2	2.62
Poland	-5.3	49.7	3.7	5.53
Portugal	1.2	97.9	2.7	2.96
Romania	-6.5	48.9	5.8	6.32
Slovakia	-5.2	57.8	3.2	3.47
Slovenia	-2.6	68.4	2.0	3.11
Spain	-3.5	105.1	2.9	3.15
Sweden	-0.6	31.5	2.0	2.2
European Union	-3.5	80.8	2.6	3.26
Eurozone	-3.6	87.4	2.4	

== Trade ==
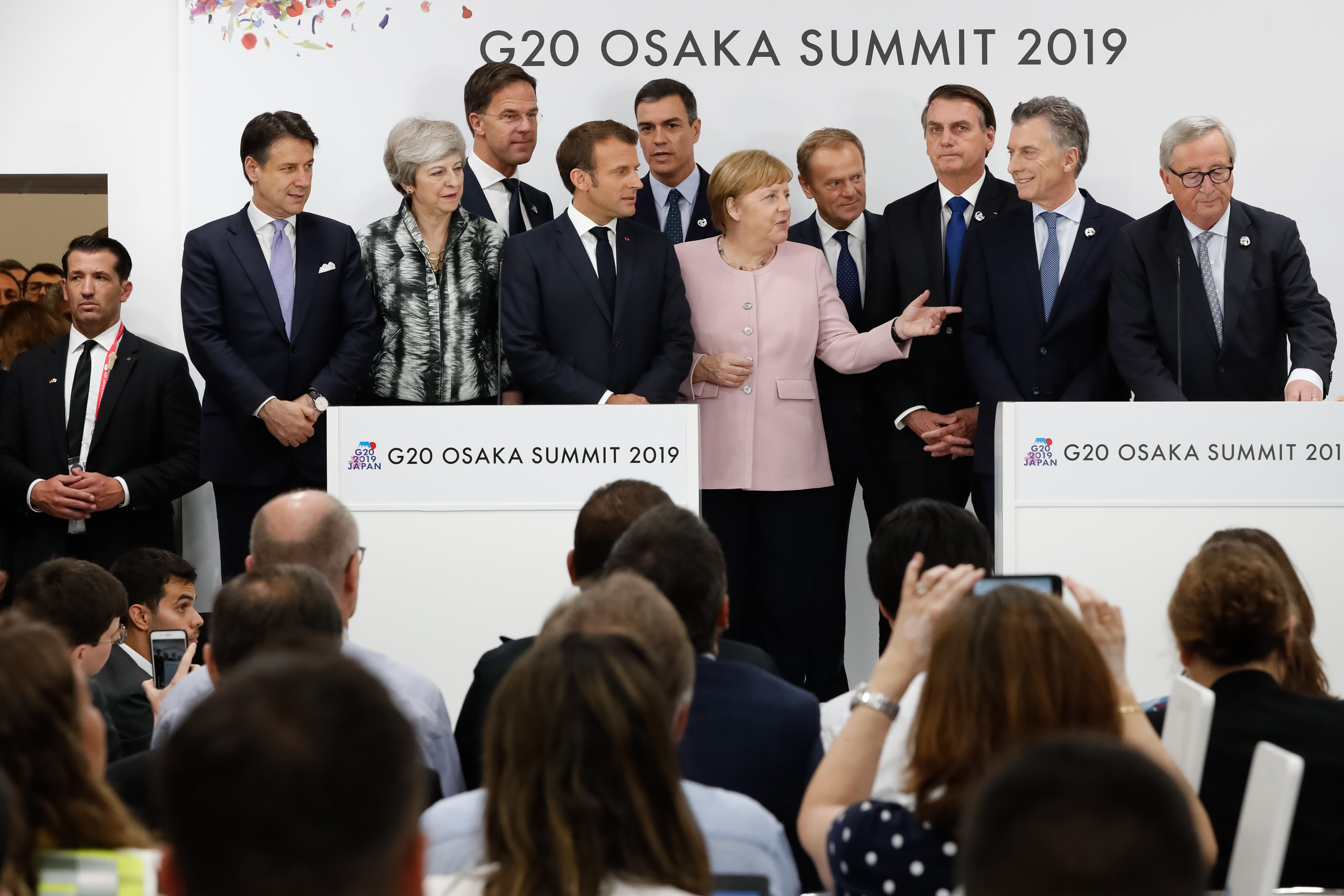
The European Union–Mercosur Free Trade Agreement would form one of the world's largest free trade areas.

20 largest trading partners (2023)

The European Union is the largest exporter in the world and as of 2008 the largest importer of goods and services. Internal trade between the member states is aided by the removal of barriers to trade such as tariffs and border controls. In the eurozone, trade is helped by not having any currency differences to deal with amongst most members.

The European Union Association Agreement does something similar for a much larger range of countries, partly as a so-called soft approach ('a carrot instead of a stick') to influence the politics in those countries. The European Union represents all its members at the World Trade Organization (WTO), and acts on behalf of member states in any disputes. When the EU negotiates trade related agreement outside the WTO framework, the subsequent agreement must be approved by each individual EU member state government.

In 2023, over half of EU enterprises exported products or services (51%), while 53% imported goods or services. Slovenia, Slovakia, Austria, and the Czech Republic are the countries with the most exporting businesses, Malta and Cyprus have the fewest.

44% of EU firms that import from China reported facing transport and logistics problems in 2023, compared to 22% of firms that import solely from within the European Union. 34% of EU firms were impacted by disruptions in logistics and transport.

In 2023, the share of EU exports to the United States rose to 21%, compared to 14% in 2010.

Main trading partners (2021)
	Partner	Imports (mil €)	% total	Exports (mil €)	% total	Total trade (mil €)	% total
	European Union	2,118,818	100%	2,180,623	100%	4,299,442	100%
1	China	472,715	22,2%	223,413	10,3%	696,127	16,2%
2	United States	232,454	11,0%	399,391	18,3%	631,845	14,7%
3	United Kingdom	146,927	6,9%	283,603	13,0%	430,530	10,0%
4	Switzerland	123,672	5,8%	156,480	7,2%	280,152	6,5%
5	Russia	162,342	7,7%	89,275	4,1%	251,617	5,9%
6	Turkey	77,983	3,7%	79,255	3,6%	157,238	3,7%
7	Norway	74,666	3,5%	56,532	2,6%	131,198	3,1%
8	Japan	62,269	2,9%	62,351	2,9%	124,621	2,9%
9	South Korea	55,440	2,6%	51,857	2,4%	107,297	2,5%
10	India	46,155	2,2%	41,844	1,9%	87,999	2,1%
11	Brazil	32,917	1,6%	33,856	1,6%	66,773	1,6%
12	Taiwan	35,576	1,7%	28,411	1,3%	63,987	1,5%
13	Mexico	23,384	1,1%	37,718	1,7%	61,101	1,4%
14	Canada	23,457	1,1%	37,249	1,7%	60,706	1,4%
15	Ukraine	24,074	1,1%	28,293	1,3%	52,367	1,2%
16	Vietnam	38,507	1,8%	10,628	0,5%	49,136	1,1%
17	Saudi Arabia	20,842	1,0%	25,007	1,2%	45,849	1,1%
18	South Africa	22,059	1,0%	22,010	1,0%	44,069	1,0%
19	Morocco	17,979	0,9%	25,133	1,2%	43,112	1,0%
20	Singapore	15,604	0,7%	27,276	1,3%	42,880	1,0%
21	Australia	9,207	0,4%	33,072	1,5%	42,279	1,0%
22	Malaysia	29,152	1,4%	11,762	0,5%	40,914	1,0%
23	United Arab Emirates	9,426	0,4%	29,813	1,4%	39,239	0,9%
24	Israel	12,599	0,6%	24,257	1,1%	36,856	0,9%
25	Thailand	22,044	1,0%	13,311	0,6%	35,355	0,8%
26	Serbia	13,998	0,7%	18,305	0,8%	32,304	0,8%
27	Algeria	19,099	0,9%	12,645	0,6%	31,744	0,7%
28	Egypt	9,053	0,4%	21,548	1,0%	30,601	0,7%
29	Hong Kong	6,854	0,3%	23,468	1,1%	30,322	0,7%
30	Nigeria	17,514	0,8%	11,169	0,5%	28,683	0,5%

Trade with partner country groupings (2012)
Partner	Imports (mil €)	% total	Exports (mil €)	% total	Total trade (mil €)	% total
Total EU	1,791,727	100%	1,686,774	100%	3,478,501	100%
ACP	99,196	5,5%	86,652	5,1%	185,848	5,3%
Andean Community	17,728	1,0%	11,738	0,7%	29,467	0,8%
ASEAN	100,035	5,6%	81,324	4,8%	181,360	5,2%
BRIC	577,513	32,2%	345,198	20,5%	922,711	26,5%
CACM	9,546	0,5%	5,354	0,3%	14,900	0,4%
EU Candidate Countries	55,386	3,1%	89,654	5,3%	145,040	4,2%
CIS	273,505	15,3%	172,641	10,2%	446,146	12,8%
EFTA	208,739	11,7%	186,222	11,0%	394,961	11,4%
Latin America Countries	109,978	6,1%	110,297	6,5%	220,275	6,3%
MEDA (excl. EU and Turkey)	73,341	4,1%	92,812	5,5%	166,153	4,8%
Mercosur	49,196	2,7%	50,266	3,0%	99,461	2,9%
NAFTA	255,657	14,3%	351,090	20,8%	606,746	17,4%

Main trading partners 2008–2011
Main trade partners	2008			2009			2010			2011		
Main trade partners	Exports (million euro)	Imports (million euro)	Total Trade (million euro)	Exports	Imports	Total Trade	Exports	Imports	Total Trade	Exports	Imports	Total Trade
Total EU	1,319,819	1,582,932	2,902,751	1,101,746	1,234,317	2,336,063	1,360,059	1,531,043	2,891,102	1,561,890	1,726,514	3,288,404
United States	247,818	182,351	430,169	203,587	154,862	358,449	242,451	173,067	415,518	263,791	191,555	455,346
China	78,276	247,815	326,091	82,391	214,238	296,629	113,426	282,509	395,935	136,372	293,693	430,065
Russia	104,843	178,294	283,137	65,587	118,122	183,709	86,134	160,709	246,843	108,355	199,922	308,277
Switzerland	100,537	82,348	182,885	88,693	80,570	169,263	110,401	85,228	195,629	142,022	93,202	235,224
Norway	43,698	95,888	139,586	37,476	68,864	106,340	41,914	78,981	120,895	46,678	93,813	140,491
Japan	42,347	76,177	118,524	35,932	58,233	94,165	43,948	67,258	111,206	49,018	69,549	118,567
Turkey	54,415	45,963	100,378	44,385	36,228	80,613	61,747	42,397	104,144	73,096	48,143	121,239
India	31,349	29,540	60,889	27,477	25,414	52,891	34,866	33,308	68,112	40,558	39,906	80,464
South Korea	25,491	39,565	65,056	21,596	32,370	53,966	27,957	39,391	67,348	32,510	36,175	68,685
Brazil	26,302	35,855	62,157	21,574	25,926	47,500	31,466	33,238	64,704	35,752	38,939	74,691
Canada	25,468	25,043	50,511	21,934	19,285	41,219	26,758	24,697	51,455	29,885	30,708	60,593
Singapore	22,213	16,137	38,350	20,404	14,579	34,983	24,550	18,760	43,310	27,256	19,184	46,440
South Africa	20,800	24,597	45,397	16,083	19,229	35,312	21,755	20,406	42,161	26,212	21,807	48,019
Saudi Arabia	21,081	22,001	43,082	19,068	11,766	30,834	23,216	16,300	39,516	26,401	28,440	54,841
Taiwan	11,595	24,069	35,660	10,021	17,875	27,896	14,782	24,138	38,920	16,212	24,230	40,532
Hong Kong	21,786	12,258	34,044	19,667	13,277	32,944	27,250	14,302	41,552	30,763	10,969	41,732
Australia	26,689	13,785	40,474	21,930	9,923	31,853	26,955	12,454	39,409	31,159	14,944	46,103
Algeria	15,391	28,259	43,650	14,807	17,410	32,217	15,584	21,069	36,653	17,279	27,844	45,123
Libya	5,836	35,308	41,144	6,484	20,870	27,354	7,087	29,230	36,317	2,093	10,444	12,537
Mexico	21,976	13,981	35,597	15,988	10,135	26,123	21,342	13,748	35,090	23,908	16,985	40,893

Trade balance, EU28 (as of 2018 before Brexit)
Trade balance (Euro billion). View chart definition.
Sources: Eurostat [ext_lt_intertrd]

Trade balance, EU27 (as of 2020 post Brexit)
Trade balance (Euro billion). View chart definition.
Sources: Eurostat, December 2019

Euro area international trade in goods surplus €23.1 bn €23.4 bn surplus for EU27

== Regional variation ==
Comparing the richest areas of the EU can be a difficult task. This is because the NUTS 1 and 2 regions are not homogenous, some of them being very large regions, such as NUTS-1 Hesse (21,100 km^{2}) or NUTS-1 Île-de-France (12,011 km^{2}), whilst other NUTS regions are much smaller, for example NUTS-1 Hamburg (755 km^{2}). An extreme example is Finland, which is divided for historical reasons into mainland Finland with 5.3 million inhabitants and Åland, an autonomous archipelago with a population of 27,000, or about the population of a small Finnish city.

One problem with this data is that some areas are subject to a large number of commuters coming into the area, thereby artificially inflating the figures. It has the effect of raising GDP but not altering the number of people living in the area, inflating the GDP per capita figure. Similar problems can be produced by a large number of tourists visiting the area or by companies nominally maintaining a presence somewhere for tax reasons but having the bulk of their actual workforce and sources of revenue in other places (e.g. until 2020 the "Double Irish" tax avoidance mechanism or currently the "Dutch Sandwich"). The data is used to define regions that are supported with financial aid in programs such as the European Regional Development Fund. The decision to delineate a Nomenclature of Territorial Units for Statistics (NUTS) region is to a large extent arbitrary (i.e. not based on objective and uniform criteria across Europe), and is decided at European level (See also: Regions of the European Union).

=== NUTS-1 and NUTS-2 regions ===
The leading regions in the ranking of NUTS-2 regional GDP per inhabitant in 2024 were the Eastern and Midland region of Ireland (268%), the Grand Duchy of Luxembourg (245%), and the Southern region of Ireland (217%).

Of the 20 richest regions in 2024, four were located in Germany, two in each of Ireland, Belgium, and the Netherlands, and one each in the Czech Republic, Romania, Hungary, Denmark, Italy, France, Poland, Sweden and Slovakia, as well as in the single region Grand Duchy of Luxembourg.

The NUTS Regulation lays down a minimum population size of 3 million and a maximum size of 7 million for the average NUTS-1 region, whereas a minimum of 800,000 and a maximum of 3 million for NUTS-2 regions. This definition, however, is not respected. For example, the région of Île-de-France, with 11.6 million inhabitants, is treated as a NUTS-2 region, while the state Free Hanseatic City of Bremen, with only 664,000 inhabitants, is treated as a NUTS-1 region.

Top NUTS-2 regions
Rank	NUTS-2 region	Member state	GDP per capita (2024)	
Rank	NUTS-2 region	Member state	In euros	As % of EU-27 average
1.	Eastern and Midland	Ireland	107,200	268%
2.	Luxembourg	Luxembourg	97,700	245%
3.	Southern	Ireland	86,500	217%
4.	Hamburg	Germany	78,300	196%
5.	Prague	Czech Republic	76,600	192%
6.	Brussels	Belgium	76,000	190%
7.	Bucharest - Ilfov	Romania	75,000	188%
8.	Capital Region of Denmark	Denmark	70,100	175%
9.	North Holland	Netherlands	69,900	175%
10.	Upper Bavaria	Germany	67,700	170%
11.	Budapest	Hungary	67,200	168%
12.	Utrecht	Netherlands	64,900	162%
13.	South Tyrol	Italy	64,200	161%
14.	Île-de-France	France	64,000	160%
15.	Warsaw	Poland	62,800	157%
16.	Walloon Brabant	Belgium	61,900	155%
17.	Stuttgart	Germany	61,300	153%
18.	Stockholm	Sweden	61,100	153%
19.	Bratislava	Slovakia	61,000	153%
20.	Darmstadt	Germany	59,200	148%

Top NUTS-1 regions
Rank	NUTS-1 region	Member state	GDP per capita (2024)	
Rank	NUTS-1 region	Member state	In euros	As % of EU-27 average
1.	Luxembourg	Luxembourg	97,700	245%
2.	Ireland	Ireland	88,500	221%
3.	Hamburg	Germany	78,300	196%
4.	Brussels-Capital Region	Belgium	76,000	190%
5.	Île-de-France	France	64,000	160%
6.	West Netherlands	Netherlands	59,700	150%
7.	Bavaria	Germany	54,000	135%
8.	Hesse	Germany	52,900	132%
9.	Bremen	Germany	52,700	132%
10.	Baden-Württemberg	Germany	52,200	131%

Of the 20 poorest regions in 2024, six were located in Greece, four in each of Bulgaria and Hungary, two in each of France and Romania, and one in each of Croatia and Slovakia.

Bottom NUTS-2 regions
Rank	NUTS-2 region	Member state	GDP per capita (2024)	
Rank	NUTS-2 region	Member state	In euros	As % of EU-27 average
1.	Mayotte	France	12,000	30%
2.	French Guiana	France	16,300	41%
3.	North-West	Bulgaria	16,700	42%
4.	North Aegean	Greece	16,800	42%
5.	North-Central	Bulgaria	17,300	43%
5.	South-Central	Bulgaria	17,300	43%
7.	Eastern Macedonia and Thrace	Greece	17,800	45%
7.	Epirus	Greece	17,800	45%
9.	Northern Hungary	Hungary	18,900	47%
10.	Western Macedonia	Greece	19,200	48%
11.	North-East	Romania	19,300	48%
12.	Western Greece	Greece	19,500	49%
13.	Northern Great Plain	Hungary	19,900	50%
14.	Southern Transdanubia	Hungary	20,000	50%
15.	North-East	Bulgaria	20,200	51%
16.	Southern Great Plain	Hungary	21,000	52%
17.	Thessaly	Greece	21,000	53%
18.	Pannonian Croatia	Croatia	21,100	53%
19.	Eastern Slovakia	Slovakia	21,400	54%
20.	South - Muntenia	Romania	21,800	55%

Bottom NUTS-1 regions
Rank	NUTS-1 region	Member state	GDP per capita (2024)	
Rank	NUTS-1 region	Member state	In euros	As % of EU-27 average
1.	Northern and Southeastern Bulgaria	Bulgaria	19,500	49%
2.	Great Plain and North	Hungary	20,000	50%
3.	Northern Greece	Greece	20,400	51%
4.	Macroregion Two	Romania	21,100	53%
5.	Central Greece	Greece	21,900	55%
6.	East Macroregion	Poland	22,900	57%
7.	Overseas departments and regions of France	France	23,000	58%
8.	Aegean Islands, Crete	Greece	23,700	59%
9.	Transdanubia	Hungary	24,500	61%
10.	Insular Italy	Italy	25,600	64%

== See also ==
- Blue Banana
- Citizenship of the European Union
- Currencies of the European Union
- European Central Bank
- Economic and Monetary Union
- Capital Markets Union
- Banking Union
- European Investment Bank
- European Union value added tax
- Eurosclerosis
- List of largest European companies by revenue
- Central banks and currencies of Europe
- Euro convergence criteria
- Currency
- List of European stock exchanges
- List of currencies in Europe
- Work–life balance in Germany
- Work–life balance
