= Operation Oscar =

Financial investigation operation

Operation Oscar is an operation started on 11 April 2022 by Europol, jointly with EU Member States, Eurojust, and Frontex, to support financial investigations by EU Member States targeting criminal assets owned by individuals and legal entities sanctioned in relation to the Russian invasion of Ukraine. Operation Oscar also aims to support criminal investigations by the member states in relation to the circumvention of EU-imposed trade and economic sanctions.

Similar to operation Sentinel, which was launched in October 2021 and which targets fraud against COVID-19 EU recovery funds, Operation Oscar is an umbrella operation that will continue for a period of at least one year and include a number of separate investigations.

== See also ==
- Economy of the European Union
