= ISO 3166-2:BG =

Entry for Bulgaria in ISO 3166-2

ISO 3166-2:BG is the entry for Bulgaria in ISO 3166-2, part of the ISO 3166 standard published by the International Organization for Standardization (ISO), which defines codes for the names of the principal subdivisions (e.g., provinces or states) of all countries coded in ISO 3166-1.

Currently for Bulgaria, ISO 3166-2 codes are defined for 28 districts.

Each code consists of two parts, separated by a hyphen. The first part is BG, the ISO 3166-1 alpha-2 code of Bulgaria. The second part is two digits (01–28). The codes are assigned in Bulgarian alphabetical order.

== Current codes ==
Subdivision names are listed as in the ISO 3166-2 standard published by the ISO 3166 Maintenance Agency (ISO 3166/MA).

Click on the button in the header to sort each column.

Code	Subdivision name (bg) (National 1999 = UN X/7 2012)	Subdivision name (bg) (Note: For reference only, Bulgarian name in Cyrillic script not included in the ISO 3166-2 standard.)
BG-01	Blagoevgrad	Благоевград
BG-02	Burgas	Бургас
BG-08	Dobrich	Добрич
BG-07	Gabrovo	Габрово
BG-26	Haskovo	Хасково
BG-09	Kardzhali	Кърджали
BG-10	Kyustendil	Кюстендил
BG-11	Lovech	Ловеч
BG-12	Montana	Монтана
BG-13	Pazardzhik	Пазарджик
BG-14	Pernik	Перник
BG-15	Pleven	Плевен
BG-16	Plovdiv	Пловдив
BG-17	Razgrad	Разград
BG-18	Ruse	Русе
BG-27	Shumen	Шумен
BG-19	Silistra	Силистра
BG-20	Sliven	Сливен
BG-21	Smolyan	Смолян
BG-23	Sofia	Софийска област
BG-22	Sofia (stolitsa)	София
BG-24	Stara Zagora	Стара Загора
BG-25	Targovishte	Търговище
BG-03	Varna	Варна
BG-04	Veliko Tarnovo	Велико Търново
BG-05	Vidin	Видин
BG-06	Vratsa	Враца
BG-28	Yambol	Ямбол

== Changes ==
The following changes to the entry have been announced by the ISO 3166/MA since the first publication of ISO 3166-2 in 1998. ISO stopped issuing newsletters in 2013.

Newsletter	Date issued	Description of change in newsletter	Code/Subdivision change
Newsletter I-2	2002-05-21	New subdivision layout: Nine regions with former names (two remaining with former code). Ten regions with new names. New references for list source, code source and romanization system	Subdivision layout: 9 regions (see below) → 28 regions
Newsletter I-9	2007-11-28	Application of the romanization system 26 October 2006	
Newsletter II-3	2011-12-13 (corrected 2011-12-15)	Local country name romanization system adjustment and source list update.	
Online Browsing; Platform (OBP)	2013-02-06	Alignment with ISO 3166-2 of the local short name Alignment with ISO 3166-2 of the local short name	
Online Browsing; Platform (OBP)	2015-11-27	Addition of romanization system	
Online Browsing; Platform (OBP)	2018-04-20	Change of subdivision category from region to district in eng and fra; update List Source	
Online Browsing; Platform (OBP)	2018-11-26	Correction of the romanization system label	

=== Codes before Newsletter I-2 ===
Former code	Subdivision name
BG-02	Burgas
BG-09	Haskovo
BG-04	Loveč
BG-05	Montana
BG-06	Plovdiv
BG-07	Ruse
BG-08	Sofija
BG-01	Sofija-Grad
BG-03	Varna

== See also ==
- Subdivisions of Bulgaria
- FIPS region codes of Bulgaria
- NUTS codes of Bulgaria
- Neighbouring countries: GR, MK, RO, RS, TR
