= NUTS statistical regions of Bulgaria =

Regions of Bulgaria Региони на България (Bulgarian)
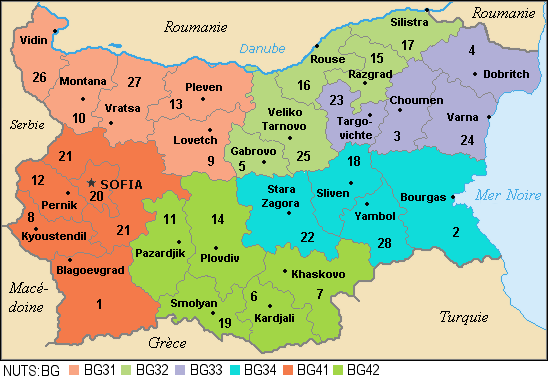
- Category: Unitary state
- Location: (Bulgaria) Bulgarian Republic
- Number: 6
- Populations: 900 000 (Severozapaden) – 2 100 000 (Yugozapaden)
- Areas: 14,900 km^{2} (5,800 sq mi) (Severoiztochen Planning Region) – 25,600 km^{2} (9,900 sq mi) (Severen Tsentralen Planning Region)
- Government: Regional Government, National Government
- Subdivisions: Province

The Nomenclature of Territorial Units for Statistics (NUTS) is a geocode standard for referencing the subdivisions of Bulgaria for statistical purposes. The standard is developed and regulated by the European Union. The NUTS standard is instrumental in delivering the European Union's Structural Funds. The NUTS code for Bulgaria is BG and a hierarchy of three levels is established by Eurostat. Below these are a further level of the geographic organisation - the local administrative unit (LAU). In Bulgaria, the LAU 1 is municipalities and the LAU 2 is settlements.

== Overall ==
=== NUTS levels ===
Level	Subdivisions	#
NUTS 1	Regions (Rayoni)	2
NUTS 2	Planning regions (Rayoni za planirane)	6
NUTS 3	Oblasts (Podregioni)	28

=== Local Administrative Units ===
Below the NUTS levels, the two LAU (Local Administrative Units) levels are:

Level	Subdivisions	#
LAU 1	Municipalities (Obshtini)	264
LAU 2	Settlements (Naseleni mesta)	5302

The LAU codes of Bulgaria can be downloaded here:

== NUTS codes ==
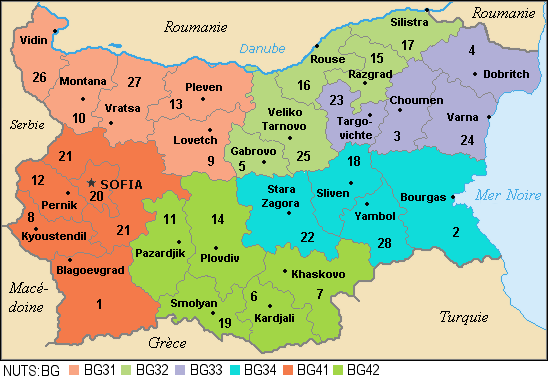
Current NUTS 2 regions of Bulgaria (six regions)

NUTS 1	Code	NUTS 2	Code	NUTS 3	Code
Northern and Eastern Bulgaria	BG3	Severozapaden (Northwestern)	BG31	Vidin Province	BG311
Northern and Eastern Bulgaria	BG3	Severozapaden (Northwestern)	BG31	Montana Province	BG312
Northern and Eastern Bulgaria	BG3	Severozapaden (Northwestern)	BG31	Vratsa Province	BG313
Northern and Eastern Bulgaria	BG3	Severozapaden (Northwestern)	BG31	Pleven Province	BG314
Northern and Eastern Bulgaria	BG3	Severozapaden (Northwestern)	BG31	Lovech Province	BG315
Northern and Eastern Bulgaria	BG3	Severen tsentralen (Northern Central)	BG32	Veliko Tarnovo Province	BG321
Northern and Eastern Bulgaria	BG3	Severen tsentralen (Northern Central)	BG32	Gabrovo Province	BG322
Northern and Eastern Bulgaria	BG3	Severen tsentralen (Northern Central)	BG32	Ruse Province	BG323
Northern and Eastern Bulgaria	BG3	Severen tsentralen (Northern Central)	BG32	Razgrad Province	BG324
Northern and Eastern Bulgaria	BG3	Severen tsentralen (Northern Central)	BG32	Silistra Province	BG325
Northern and Eastern Bulgaria	BG3	Severoiztochen (Northeastern)	BG33	Varna Province	BG331
Northern and Eastern Bulgaria	BG3	Severoiztochen (Northeastern)	BG33	Dobrich Province	BG332
Northern and Eastern Bulgaria	BG3	Severoiztochen (Northeastern)	BG33	Shumen Province	BG333
Northern and Eastern Bulgaria	BG3	Severoiztochen (Northeastern)	BG33	Targovishte Province	BG334
Northern and Eastern Bulgaria	BG3	Yugoiztochen (Southeastern)	BG34	Burgas Province	BG341
Northern and Eastern Bulgaria	BG3	Yugoiztochen (Southeastern)	BG34	Sliven Province	BG342
Northern and Eastern Bulgaria	BG3	Yugoiztochen (Southeastern)	BG34	Yambol Province	BG343
Northern and Eastern Bulgaria	BG3	Yugoiztochen (Southeastern)	BG34	Stara Zagora Province	BG344
South-Western and South-Central Bulgaria	BG4	Yugozapaden (Southwestern)	BG41	Sofia City	BG411
South-Western and South-Central Bulgaria	BG4	Yugozapaden (Southwestern)	BG41	Sofia Province	BG412
South-Western and South-Central Bulgaria	BG4	Yugozapaden (Southwestern)	BG41	Blagoevgrad Province	BG413
South-Western and South-Central Bulgaria	BG4	Yugozapaden (Southwestern)	BG41	Pernik Province	BG414
South-Western and South-Central Bulgaria	BG4	Yugozapaden (Southwestern)	BG41	Kyustendil Province	BG415
South-Western and South-Central Bulgaria	BG4	Yuzhen tsentralen (Southern Central)	BG42	Plovdiv Province	BG421
South-Western and South-Central Bulgaria	BG4	Yuzhen tsentralen (Southern Central)	BG42	Haskovo Province	BG422
South-Western and South-Central Bulgaria	BG4	Yuzhen tsentralen (Southern Central)	BG42	Pazardzhik Province	BG423
South-Western and South-Central Bulgaria	BG4	Yuzhen tsentralen (Southern Central)	BG42	Smolyan Province	BG424
South-Western and South-Central Bulgaria	BG4	Yuzhen tsentralen (Southern Central)	BG42	Kardzhali Province	BG425

In the 2003 version, the codes were as follows:

BG1 North Bulgaria

BG11 North West

BG111 Vidin
BG112 Montana
BG113 Vratsa

BG12 North Central

BG121 Pleven
BG122 Lovech
BG123 Veliko Tarnovo
BG124 Gabrovo
BG125 Ruse

BG13 North East

BG131 Varna
BG132 Dobrich
BG133 Shumen
BG134 Targovishte
BG135 Razgrad
BG136 Silistra

BG2 South Bulgaria

BG21 South West

BG211 Grad Sofiya
BG212 Sofiya
BG213 Blagoevgrad
BG214 Pernik
BG215 Kyustendil

BG22 South Central

BG221 Plovdiv
BG222 Stara Zagora
BG223 Haskovo
BG224 Pazardzhik
BG225 Smolyan
BG226 Kardzhali

BG23 South East

BG231 Burgas
BG232 Sliven
BG233 Yambol

== NUTS 2 regions redrawing ==
Some of the present NUTS II regions of Bulgaria no longer meet the relevant technical requirements, mostly due to general population decline and increasing regional disproportion. A 2013 study by FLGR Consult commissioned by the Ministry of Regional Development and Public Works analyzed the state and trends of change in the characteristics of these regions to identify several options for the pending redrawing of the NUTS II map of the country. The process was restarted in 2017 with certain modified versions considered, and final decision due by the end of 2018. The relevant Regional Development (Amendment) Bill, released for public consultation by the Council of Ministers in October 2018, is based on a four-regions version chosen from the shortlist of three options developed by an inter-ministerial working group led by the Ministry of Regional Development and Public Works.

Proposal option 1

Proposal option 2 underlying the Regional Development (Amendment) Bill of October 2018

Proposal option 3

Proposal option 4

Proposal option 5

== See also ==
- Subdivisions of Bulgaria
- ISO 3166-2 codes of Bulgaria
- FIPS region codes of Bulgaria
- List of Bulgarian regions by Human Development Index

== Sources ==
- Hierarchical list of the Nomenclature of territorial units for statistics - NUTS and the Statistical regions of Europe
- Overview map of EU Countries - NUTS level 1
  - BULGARIA - NUTS level 2
  - BULGARIA - NUTS level 3
- Correspondence between the NUTS levels and the national administrative units
- List of current NUTS codes
  - Download current NUTS codes (ODS format)
- Regions of Bulgaria, Statoids.com
