= Subdivisions of Bulgaria =

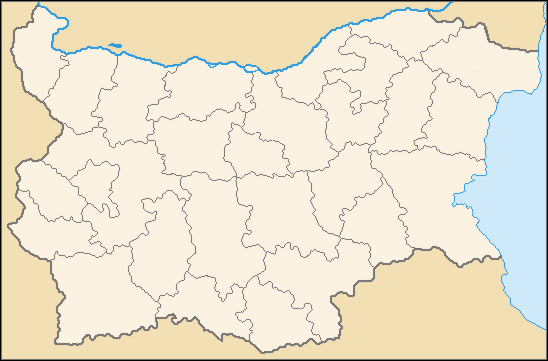
Map of the provinces of Bulgaria

Subdivisions of Bulgaria:

- Provinces of Bulgaria – first level
- City of Sofia – first level
- Municipalities of Bulgaria

== History ==
After the liberation of Bulgaria, the country administrative were divided to 12 provinces (Bulgarian: губернии).

=== Okrazhiya and departments ===
After 1880 Kingdom of Bulgaria were separated to 21 Okrazhiya (in English: regimental). During the years to 1885 Eastern Rumelia, where were living Bulgarians (around 92%) administrative separated to 6 departments.

== NUTS ==
Level	Subdivisions	#
NUTS 1	Regions (Rajoni)	2
NUTS 2	Planning regions (Rajoni za planirane)	6
NUTS 3	Oblasts (Podregioni)	28

Level	Subdivisions	#
LAU 1	Municipalities (Obshtini)	264
LAU 2	Settlements (Naseleni mesta)	5329
