= Ostösterreich =

Ostösterreich is the Austrian name of East Austria region AT1. It corresponds with the NUTS-1 region of East Austrian states of Vienna, Lower Austria, and Burgenland. Currently, there is a transportation association for this region called Verkehrsverbund Ost-Region.

== Sources ==
- Hierarchical list of the Nomenclature of territorial units for statistics - NUTS and the Statistical regions of Europe
- A map of Austria showing AT1, AT2, AT3 areas
- German language wiki of Ostösterreich
