= List of Bulgarian regions by Human Development Index =

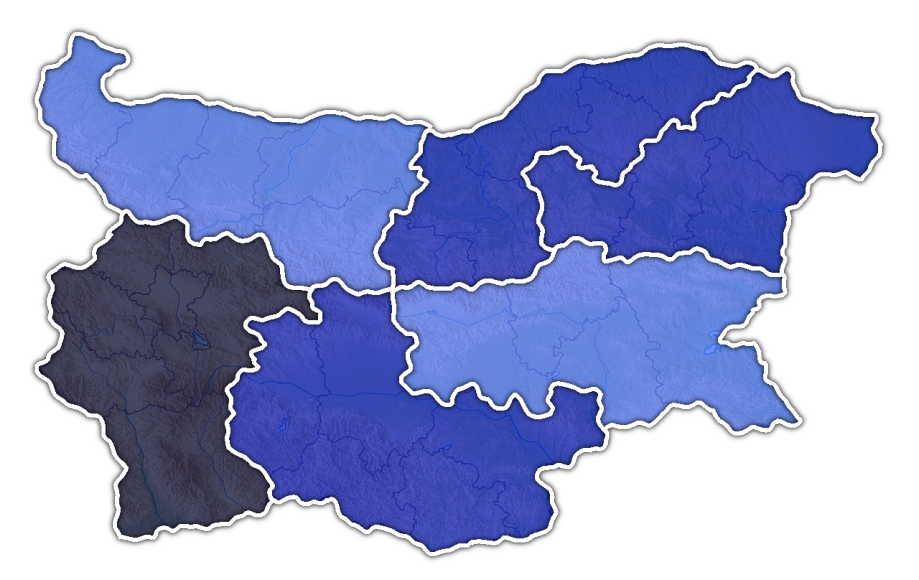
Map of the Bulgarian regions by Human Development Index in 2021 Legend: >0.800 0.775 – 0.800 0.750 – 0.775

This is a list of NUTS2 statistical regions of Bulgaria by Human Development Index as of 2023.

Rank	Region	HDI (2023)
Very high human development
1	Yugozapaden	0.905
–	Bulgaria	0.845
2	Severoiztochen	0.822
3	Yuzhen Tsentralen	0.817
4	Severen Tsentralen	0.813
5	Yugoiztochen	0.810
High human development
6	Severozapaden	0.786
