= Provinces of Bulgaria =

First-level administrative subdivisions of Bulgaria

Provinces of Bulgaria Oбласти на България (Bulgarian)
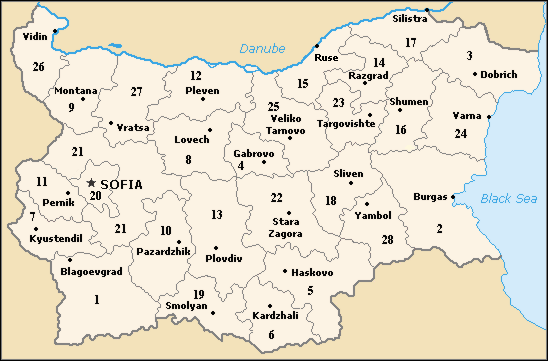
- Category: Unitary state
- Location: Republic of Bulgaria
- Found in: Regions
- Number: 28
- Populations: 101,018 (Vidin) – 1,291,591 (Sofia City)
- Areas: 1,348.90 km^{2} (520.81 sq mi) (Sofia City)– 7,748.07 km^{2} (2,991.55 sq mi) (Burgas)
- Government: Province government, National government
- Subdivisions: Municipality

The provinces of Bulgaria (Bulgarian: области на България, romanized: oblasti na Bǎlgariya) are the first-level administrative subdivisions of the country. Since 1999, Bulgaria has been divided into 28 provinces (Bulgarian: области – oblasti; singular: област – oblast; also translated as "regions") which correspond approximately to the 28 districts (in Bulgarian: окръг – okrǎg, plural: окръзи – okrǎzi), that existed before 1987.

The provinces are further subdivided into 265 municipalities (singular: община – obshtina, plural: общини – obshtini). Sofia – the capital city of Bulgaria and the largest settlement in the country – is the administrative centre of both Sofia Province and Sofia City Province (Sofia-grad). The capital is included (together with three other cities plus 34 villages) in Sofia Capital Municipality (over 90% of whose population lives in Sofia), which is the sole municipality comprising Sofia City province.

== Terminology ==
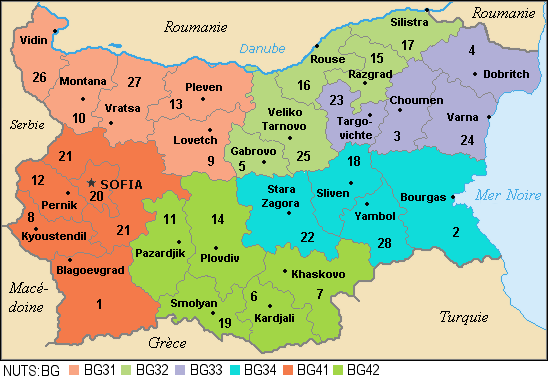
Distribution of provinces by NUTS: Level 1 (regions): North Eastern, North Central, North Western, South Central, South Eastern, South Western; Level 2 (planning regions)

The provinces do not have official names – legally (in the President's decree on their constitution), they are not named but only described as "oblast with administrative centre [Noun]" – together with a list of the constituting municipalities. In Bulgaria they are usually called "[Adjective] Oblast"; occasionally they are referred to as "Oblast [Noun]" and rarely as "oblast with administrative centre [Noun]".

The Bulgarian term oblast (област) is preferably translated into English as "province", in order to avoid disambiguation and distinguish from the former unit called okrag ("окръг", translated as "district"), and the term region (регион, always translated as "region"). At any rate, "district" and "region" are sometimes still used to name these contemporary 28 units.

- Region: "28 regions (en) / région (fr) / oblast (bg) – in ISO 3166-2". Newsletter II-3 (2011-12-13, corrected 2011-12-15)
- District: "The territory of the South Central Region encompasses five districts – Pazardzhik, Plovdiv, Smolyan, Haskovo, and Kyrdzhali" according to the European Commission.

== Provinces ==
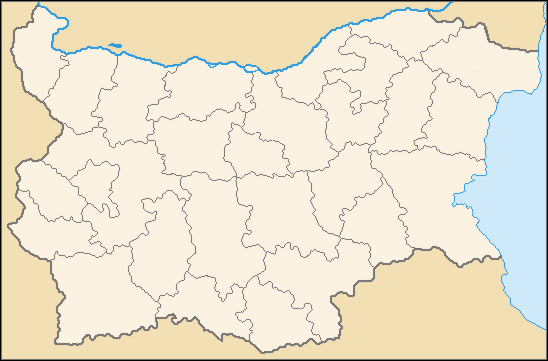

Province	Population (Census 2011)	Population (Census 2021)	Change (2011/2021)	Land area (km^{2})	Population density (/km^{2})	Municipalities	Planning Region
Blagoevgrad	323,552	292,227	-9.7%	6,449.47	45.31	14	South Western
Burgas	415,817	380,286	-8.5%	7,748.07	49.08	13	South Eastern
Dobrich	189,677	150,146	-20.8%	4,719.71	31.81	8	North Eastern
Gabrovo	122,702	98,387	-19.8%	2,023.01	48.63	4	North Central
Haskovo	246,238	211,565	-14.1%	5,533.29	38.23	11	South Central
Kardzhali	152,808	141,177	-7.6%	3,209.11	43.99	7	South Central
Kyustendil	136,686	111,736	-18.3%	3,051.52	36.61	9	South Western
Lovech	141,422	116,394	-17.7%	4,128.76	28.19	8	North Western
Montana	148,098	119,950	-19.0%	3,635.38	32.99	11	North Western
Pazardzhik	275,548	229,814	-16.6%	4,456.92	51.56	12	South Central
Pernik	133,530	114,162	-14.5%	2,394.22	47.68	6	South Western
Pleven	269,752	226,120	-16.2%	4,653.32	48.59	11	North Western
Plovdiv	683,027	634,497	-7.1%	5,972.89	106.22	18	South Central
Razgrad	125,190	103,223	-17.5%	2,639.74	39.10	7	North Central
Ruse	235,252	193,483	-17.8%	2,803.36	69.01	8	North Central
Shumen	180,528	151,465	-16.1%	3,389.68	44.68	10	North Eastern
Silistra	119,474	97,770	-18.2%	2,846.29	34.34	7	North Central
Sliven	197,473	172,690	-12.6%	3,544.07	48.72	4	South Eastern
Smolyan	121,752	96,284	-20.9%	3,192.85	30.15	10	South Central
Sofia City	1,291,591	1,274,290	-1.3%	1,348.90	944.68	1	South Western
Sofia Province	247,489	231,989	-6.3%	7,062.33	32.84	22	South Western
Stara Zagora	333,265	296,507	-11.0%	5,151.12	57.56	11	South Eastern
Targovishte	120,818	98,144	-18.8%	2,558.53	38.35	5	North Eastern
Varna	475,074	432,198	-9.0%	3,819.47	113.15	12	North Eastern
Veliko Tarnovo	258,494	207,371	-19.8%	4,661.57	44.48	10	North Central
Vidin	101,018	75,408	-25.4%	3,032.88	24.86	11	North Western
Vratsa	186,848	152,813	-18.2%	3,619.77	42.21	10	North Western
Yambol	131,447	109,693	-16.5%	3,355.48	32.69	5	South Eastern
Bulgaria	7,364,570	6,519,789	-11.5%	111,001.71	58.73	265	

== History ==
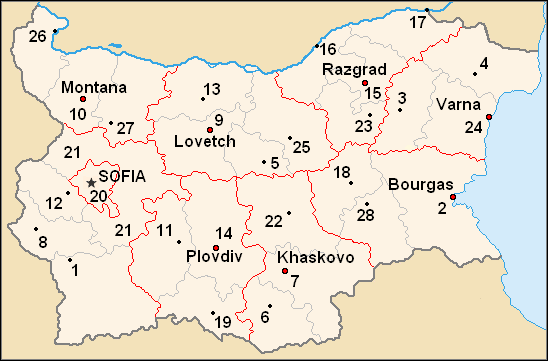
Provinces (with ex-districts) in 1987–1999

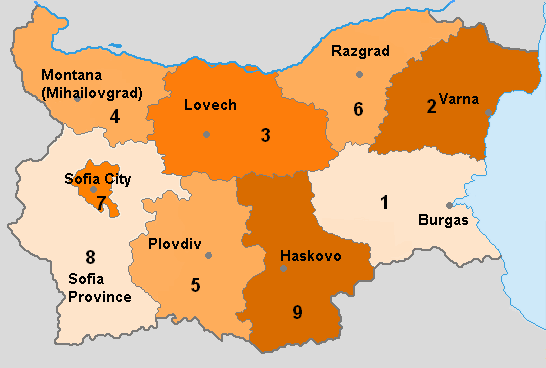
Provinces of Bulgaria from 1987 to 1998

In 1987, the then-existing 28 districts (okrags) were transformed into 9 large units (in Bulgarian called oblasts – provinces), which survived until 1999. The 9 large provinces are listed below, along with the pre-1987 districts (post-1999 small provinces) comprising them.

1987–1998 oblasts	Comprising former districts (future provinces)
Burgas	Burgas, Sliven, Yambol
Haskovo	Haskovo, Kardzhali, Stara Zagora
Lovech	Gabrovo, Lovech, Pleven, Veliko Tarnovo
Montana	Montana, Vidin, Vratsa
Plovdiv	Pazardzhik, Plovdiv, Smolyan
Razgrad	Razgrad, Ruse, Silistra, Targovishte
Sofia	Sofia City
Sofia	Blagoevgrad, Kyustendil, Pernik, Sofia
Varna	Dobrich, Shumen, Varna

On 1 January 1999, the old districts were restored with some modifications; however, the designation oblast ("province") was kept.

== See also ==
- Administrative divisions below the province level:
  - List of cities and towns in Bulgaria
  - List of villages in Bulgaria
  - Municipalities of Bulgaria
- ISO 3166-2:BG
- List of Bulgarian constituencies, which are based on the provinces
- List of Bulgarian provinces by GDP
- List of governors of the provinces of Bulgaria (in French)
