= Severoiztochen Planning Region =

Coordinates: 43°30′N 27°15′E

Severoiztochen Planning Region Североизточен район за планиране
- Planning region
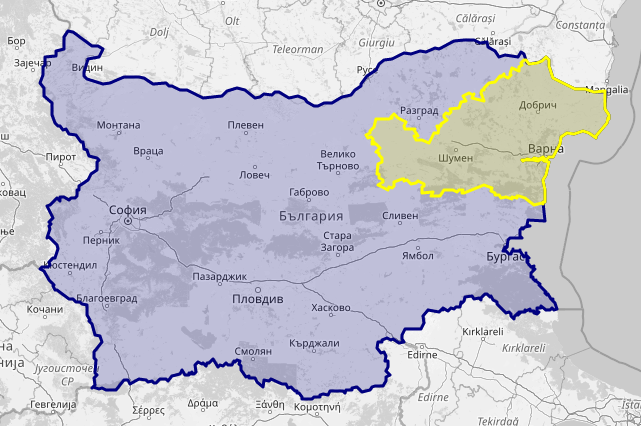
- Country: Bulgaria
- Seat: Varna

Area
  - Total: 14,487.4 km^{2} (5,593.6 sq mi)

Population (2018)
  - Total: 933,705 ▼
  - Density: 64.4495/km^{2} (166.923/sq mi)

GDP (nominal, 2024)
  - Total: €10.324 billion
  - Per capita: €12,499
- Time zone: UTC+2 (EET)
  - Summer (DST): UTC+3 (EEST)
- NUTS code: BG33
- HDI (2023): 0.837 ▲ very high · 2nd of 6

Severoiztochen Planning Region (Northeast Planning Region) is a planning region in Bulgaria. The region includes four provinces: Targovishte Province, Varna Province, Shumen Province and Dobrich Province.

The largest cities are: Varna (360,000 - city proper; 500,000 - metro area), Dobrich (105,000 - city; 115,000 - agglomeration), Shumen (95,000), Silistra (42,000 -city; 52,000 - agglomeration). The agglomeration of Varna includes the towns of Provadia (14,000), Devnya (10,000), Aksakovo (7600 - fastest growing town in area) and others. The agglomeration of Silistra includes the largest villages in Bulgaria - Aydemir (7800) and Kalipetrovo (4700).

It is bordered on the east by the Black Sea. The Kamchia river flows through the region.

== Economy ==
One of richest regions of Bulgaria, Severoiztochen is important for the national economy. Its economy is service-oriented and includes tourism. Severoiztochen is the second region most-visited region by foreign tourists after Yugoiztochen. Notable resorts include Golden Sands, Albena, SS Constantine and Helena. Interesting places are the towns of Balchik, Kavarna, Cape Kaliakra - on the sea, Madara - nearby Shumen, Srebarna Nature Reserve - nearby Silistra; Shumen boasts the Monument to 1300 Years of Bulgaria. Silistra Province and Dobrich Province form Southern Dobruja - the Bulgarian breadbasket. The port of Varna is the largest port in Bulgaria and the third largest on the Black Sea. The port of Balchik is a small fishing town. On the Danube, important ports are Silistra - fourth largest on the river, and Tutrakan. Varna is Bulgaria's second financial capital after Sofia; the city produces electronics, ships, food and other goods. Other important industrial centers in the region are Shumen - production and repair of trucks; Dobrich - big food-producing city, unofficial capital of Dobruja; Silistra - electronics, food; Devnya - big chemical center (cement and nitric fertilizer); Tutrakan - food and fishing boat.

== See also ==
- NUTS of Bulgaria
