= Yuzhen Tsentralen Planning Region =

Coordinates: 42°0′N 25°0′E

Yuzhen Tsentralen Planning Region Южен централен район за планиране
- Planning region
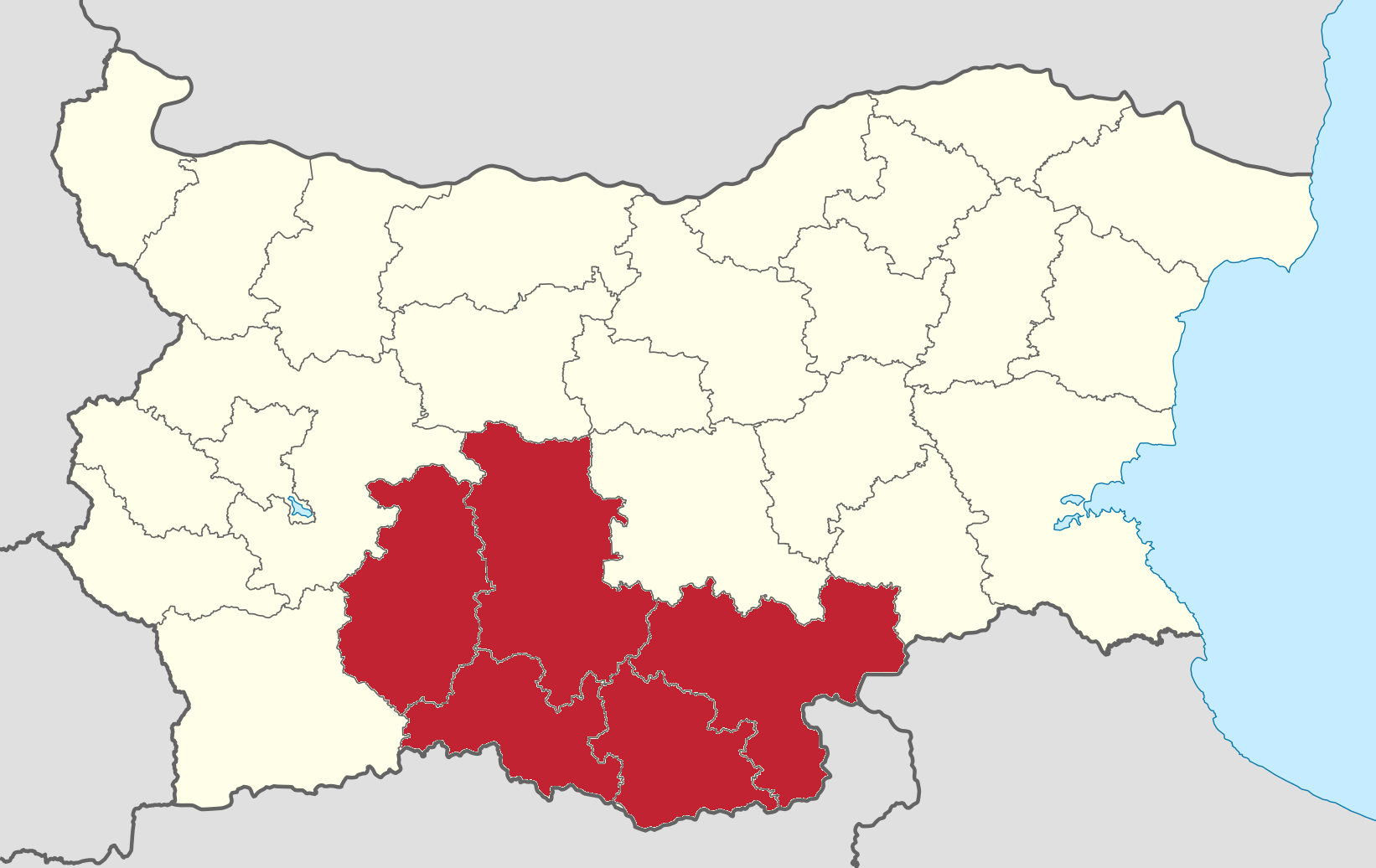
- Country: Bulgaria
- Seat: Plovdiv

Area
  - Total: 22,365.1 km^{2} (8,635.2 sq mi)

Population (2018)
  - Total: 1,417,432 ▼
  - Density: 63.3770/km^{2} (164.146/sq mi)

GDP (nominal, 2024)
  - Total: €13.983 billion
  - Per capita: €10,707
- Time zone: UTC+2 (EET)
  - Summer (DST): UTC+3 (EEST)
- NUTS code: BG42
- HDI (2023): 0.831 ▲ very high · 3rd of 6

Yuzhen Tsentralen Planning Region (South-Central Planning Region) is a Bulgarian planning region. The capital is Plovdiv, the second-largest city in Bulgaria. It includes five Bulgarians provinces: Plovdiv Province, Pazardzhik Province, Smolyan Province, Kardzhali Province and Haskovo Province.

It is the second most important economical region of the country which together with the Yugozapaden region produce almost two thirds of the national GDP.

== See also ==
- NUTS of Bulgaria
