= Yugozapaden Planning Region =

Coordinates: 42°15′N 23°0′E

Southwest Planning Region Югозападен район за планиране
- Planning region
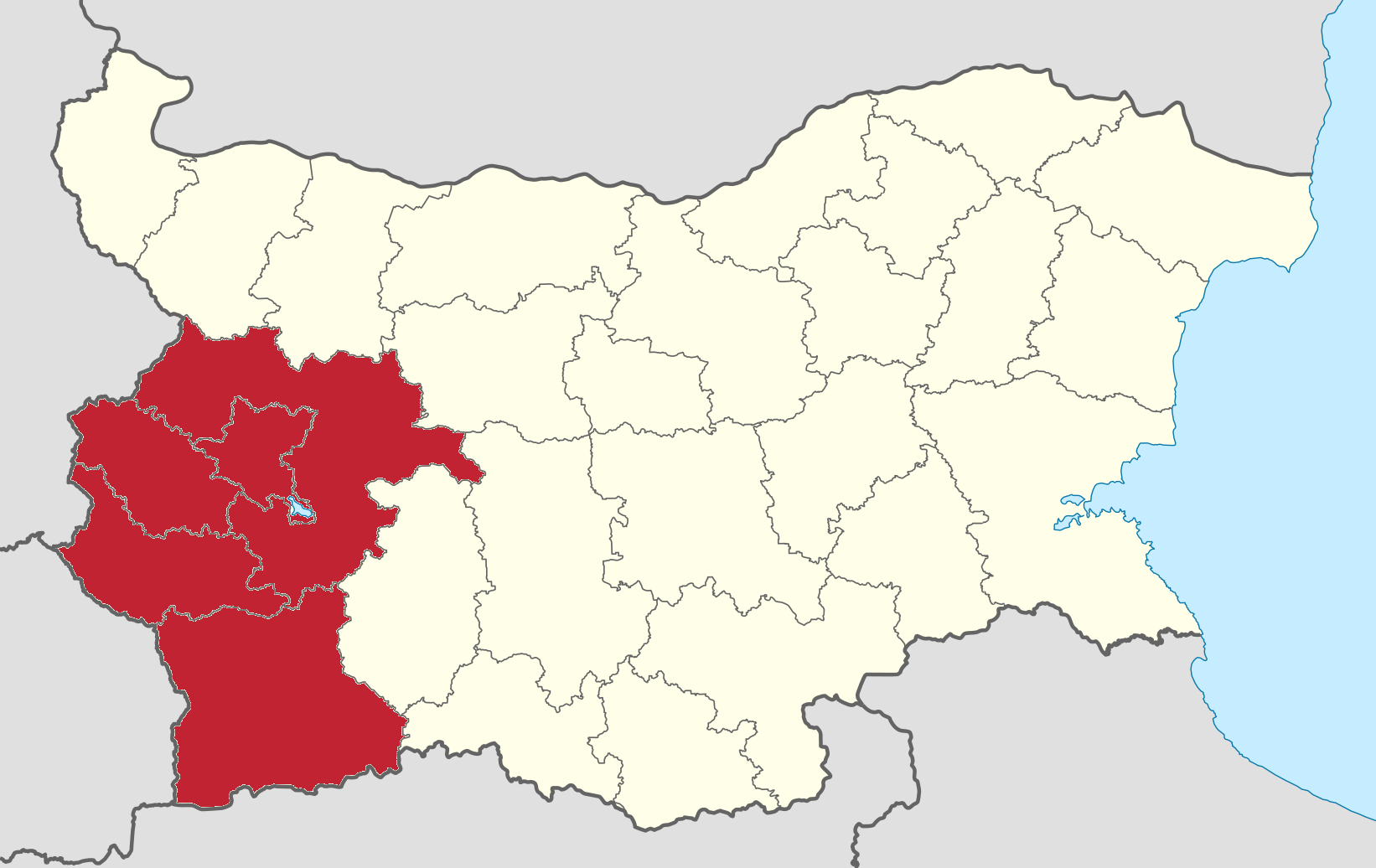
- Country: Bulgaria
- Seat: Sofia

Area
  - Total: 20,306.4 km^{2} (7,840.3 sq mi)

Population (2018)
  - Total: 2,108,394 ▼
  - Density: 103.829/km^{2} (268.916/sq mi)

GDP (nominal, 2024)
  - Total: €55.168 billion
  - Per capita: €26,295
- Time zone: UTC+2 (EET)
  - Summer (DST): UTC+3 (EEST)
- NUTS code: BG41
- HDI (2023): 0.920 ▲ very high · 1st of 6

Yugozapaden Planning Region (Southwest Planning Region) is a planning region in Bulgaria. The capital, also the national capital, is Sofia. It includes: Blagoevgrad Province, Sofia city, Sofia Province, Pernik Province and Kyustendil Province.

The region is Bulgaria's richest. The capital's economic sectors are diversified, including services and industries. The region produces approximately half of the national GDP.

== See also ==
- NUTS of Bulgaria
