= Yugoiztochen Planning Region =

Coordinates: 42°30′N 26°15′E

Yugoiztochen Planning Region Югоизточен район за планиране
- Planning region
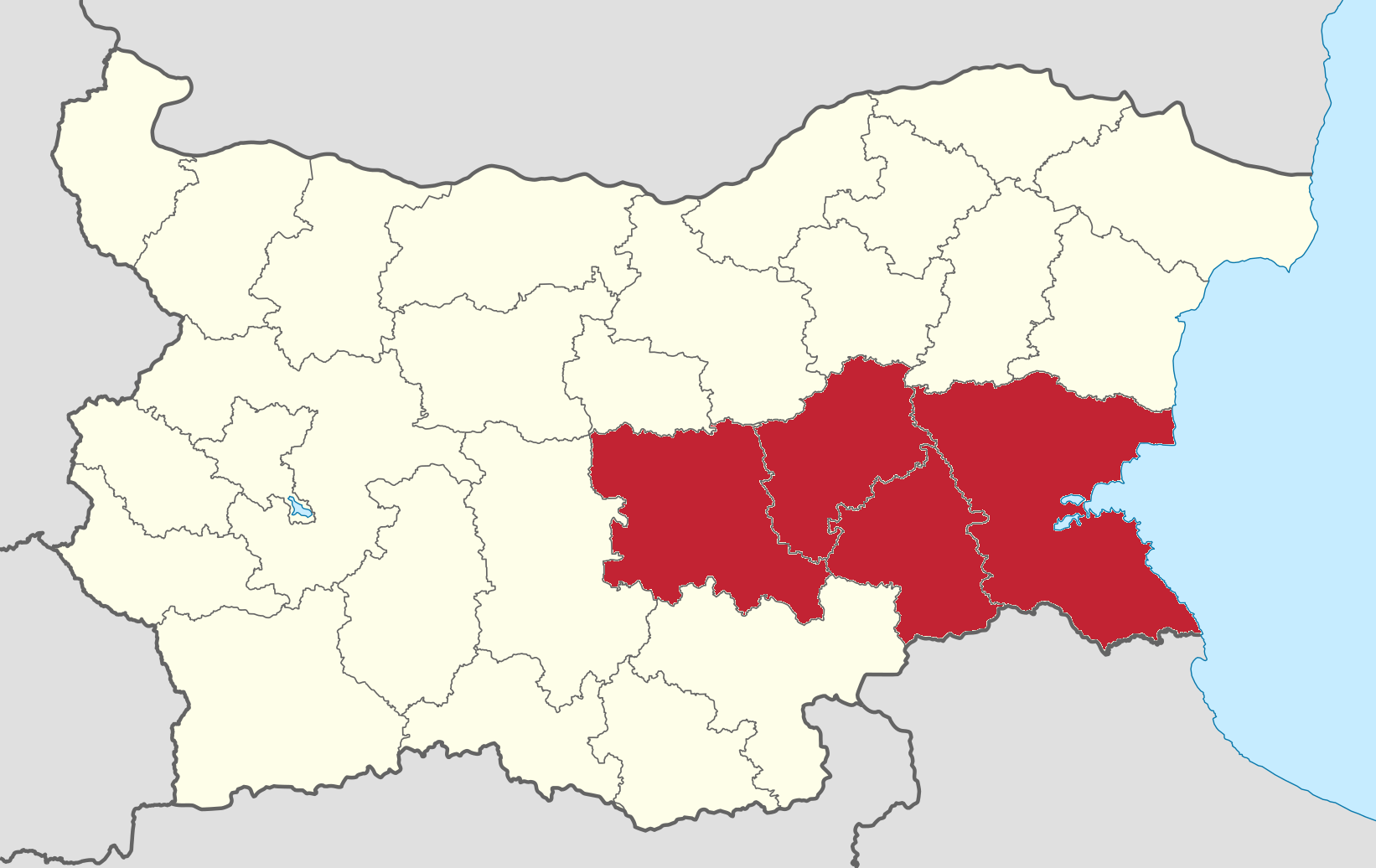
- Country: Bulgaria
- Seat: Burgas

Area
  - Total: 19,798.7 km^{2} (7,644.3 sq mi)

Population (2018)
  - Total: 1,039,549 ▼
  - Density: 52.5059/km^{2} (135.990/sq mi)

GDP (nominal, 2024)
  - Total: €13.272 billion
  - Per capita: €13,927
- Time zone: UTC+2 (EET)
  - Summer (DST): UTC+3 (EEST)
- NUTS code: BG34
- HDI (2023): 0.825 ▲ very high · 5th of 6

Yugoiztochen Planning Region (Southeast Planning Region) is one of Bulgaria's planning regions. The capital is Burgas. It includes Burgas Province, Sliven Province, Yambol Province and Stara Zagora Province.

Mostly inhabited by ethnic Bulgarians, it is also contains one of the highest rates of Romani people in the country. It is the least densely populated region in the country. The largest cities are Burgas - 200,000; Stara Zagora - 145,000, Sliven - 98,000; Yambol - 80,000, Kazanlak - 55,000.

== Economy ==
Yugoiztochen is the second poorest Bulgarian planning region. Most important to its economy are tourism, electric power generation, and services. Burgas is the second largest Bulgarian port, and the biggest tourist centres are Sunny beach, Sozopol, Pomorie, Primorsko, Ravda and Kiten. The main industrial centers are the big cities and towns of Radnevo and Galabovo - electric power generation and mining.

== See also ==
- NUTS of Bulgaria
