= Severozapaden Planning Region =

Coordinates: 43°15′N 24°0′E

Severozapaden Planning Region Северозападен район за планиране
- Planning region
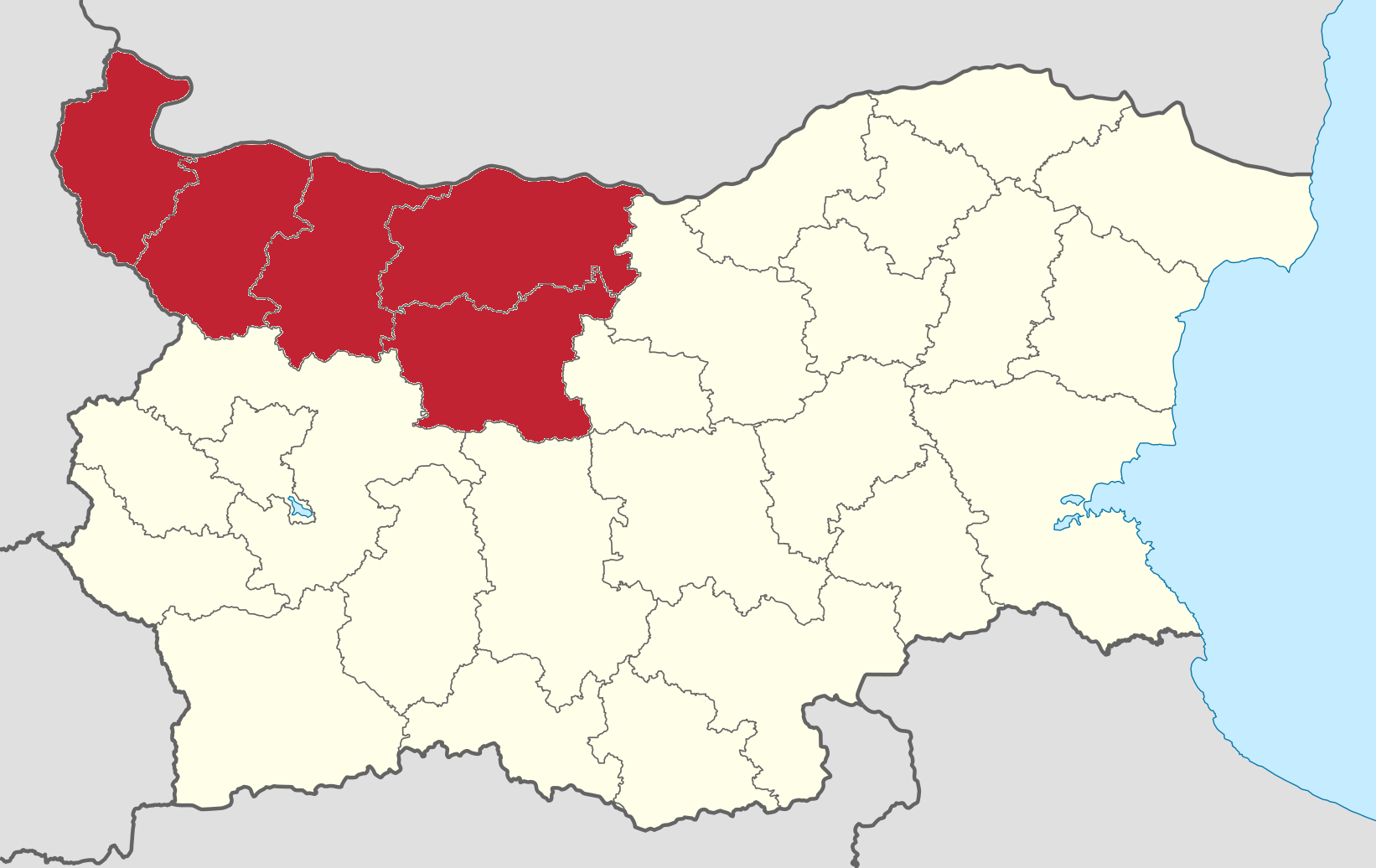
- Country: Bulgaria
- Seat: Pleven

Area
  - Total: 19,070.3 km^{2} (7,363.1 sq mi)

Population (2020)
  - Total: 728,157 ▼
  - Density: 38.1828/km^{2} (98.8929/sq mi)

GDP (nominal, 2024)
  - Total: €6.795 billion
  - Per capita: €10,374
- Time zone: UTC+2 (EET)
  - Summer (DST): UTC+3 (EEST)
- NUTS code: BG31
- HDI (2021): 0.801 ▲ very high · 6th of 6

Severozapaden (Northwest Planning Region), is a region of Bulgaria. The capital is the city of Pleven. The region has the lowest-ranked economy in Bulgaria and the European Union, with a GDP per capita (PPS) of €9,300 or 31% of EU28 average (2017). It includes five administrative divisions or oblasts: Vidin Province, Vratsa Province, Montana Province, Lovech Province and Pleven Province.

According to Eurostat, Severozapaden is the poorest region in the EU. It is also ranked as one of the European regions with the lowest life expectancy since Bulgarians from the region of Severozapaden are predicted to live just past their 73rd birthday. It additionally is the least developed planning region of Bulgaria.

== See also ==
- NUTS of Bulgaria
