= Severen Tsentralen Planning Region =

Coordinates: 43°15′N 26°0′E

Severen Tsentralen Planning Region Северен централен район за планиране
- Planning region
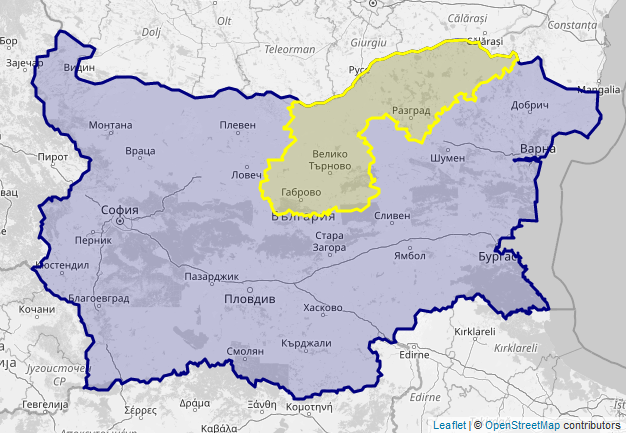
- Country: Bulgaria
- Seat: Ruse

Area
  - Total: 14,974.0 km^{2} (5,781.5 sq mi)

Population (2018)
  - Total: 794,998 ▼
  - Density: 53.0919/km^{2} (137.507/sq mi)

GDP (nominal, 2024)
  - Total: €7.226 billion
  - Per capita: €10,737
- Time zone: UTC+2 (EET)
  - Summer (DST): UTC+3 (EEST)
- NUTS code: BG32
- HDI (2023): 0.827 ▲ very high · 4rd of 6

Severen Tsentralen Planning Region (Bulgarian: Северен централен район за планиране) is a planning region of Bulgaria, encompassing five Bulgarian provinces: Ruse, Veliko Tarnovo, Gabrovo, Targovishte and Razgrad.

The region is mostly inhabited by Bulgarians, Turkish and Romani people. Its largest cities are Ruse (population 143,000), Gabrovo (48,000) and Veliko Tarnovo (130,000, including hinterland).

Severen Tsentralen has a GDP per capita (PPS) of 10,200 (34% of the EU28 average) making it one of the least developed regions of Europe. The two main economic centres are Veliko Turnovo, the capital of the Second Bulgarian Empire and Ruse, Bulgaria's largest fluvial port.

== See also ==
- NUTS of Bulgaria
