= Region (Europe) =

First subnational layer of EU government administration

The European Union created a Committee of the Regions to represent Regions of Europe as the layer of EU government administration directly below the nation-state level. The committee has its headquarters in Brussels.

Reasons given for this include:

- the historic and cultural claims for autonomy in many regions all over the EU
- strengthening the political and economic situation in those regions

Some nation states which have historically had a strong centralized administration have transferred political power to the regions. Examples of this include the current negotiations in France concerning increased autonomy for Corsica. Some other states have traditionally had strong regions, such as the Federal Republic of Germany or the autonomous communities of Spain; yet others have been structured on the basis of national and municipal government with little in between. During the United Kingdom's membership of the EU, the term 'region' also included England, Scotland, Wales and Northern Ireland which are formally referred to as countries by the British government.

== Competence ==
Regional and local authorities elect delegates to the Committee of the Regions. The committee is a consultative body, and is asked for its opinion by the council or the commission on new policies and legislation in the following areas:

- Education
- Training
- Culture
- Public Health
- Anti-drug support
- Trans-European Networks
- Social and Economic Cohesion
- Structural Funds

On certain issues it works in partnership with the Economic and Social Committee.

== Political influence ==
The politics of regionalism has also had an impact at the pan-European level. The regions of Europe had lobbied for an increased say in EU affairs, especially the German Länder. This resulted in the creation by the Maastricht Treaty of the Committee of the Regions, and provision for member states to be represented in the council by ministers from their regional governments.

The Council of Europe also has a congress of local and regional authorities, similar to the EU's Committee of the Regions.

Strengthening economic competition between communities further supports the creation of authentic regions within the EU and almost all EU member states recently have or currently are re-organizing their administration to create competitive EU regions. Often these regions better reflect culture and identity and a sense of common interests.

Of the major organisations representing the regions of Europe, the Assembly of European Regions (AER) is the largest. Established in 1985, the organisation now brings together over 270 regions from 33 countries, along with 16 interregional associations, across wider Europe. Apart from playing a key role as the regions' political voice on the European stage, AER is a forum for interregional cooperation in numerous areas of regional competence, including economic development, social policy, public health, culture, education and youth. The organisation is also a key defender of the subsidiarity principle in Europe, lobbying for its inclusion in the EU treaties and demanding recognition of the word in dictionaries via the worldwide "Subsidiarity is a word" movement.

Outside EU institutions, the Council of European Municipalities and Regions (CEMR-CCRE) is the largest organisation of local and regional government in Europe; its members are national associations of towns, municipalities and regions from over 35 countries. Together these associations represent some 100,000 local and regional authorities.

CEMR works to promote a united Europe that is based on local and regional self-government and democracy. To achieve this goal it endeavours to shape the future of Europe by enhancing local and regional contribution, to influence European law and policy, to exchange experience at local and regional level and to cooperate with partners in other parts of the world.

== See also ==
- Euroregion
- Classification of Territorial Units for Statistics (NUTS)
- Historical regions of Central Europe
- Historical regions of the Balkan Peninsula
- Europe
- List of Regions of Europe (supranational, contrasting with EU subnational regions)
- REGLEG
