= Demographics of Bulgaria =

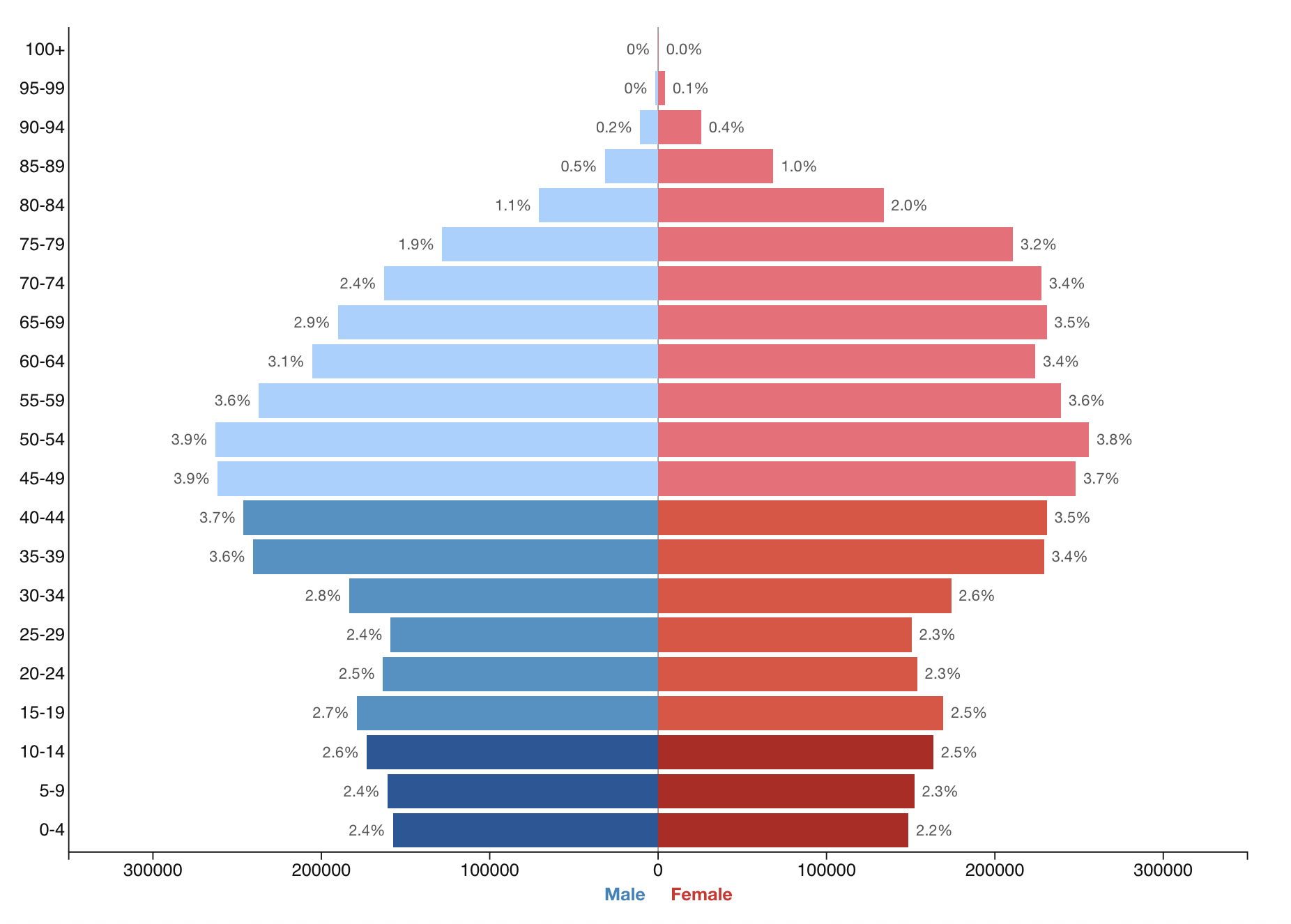
- Bulgaria population pyramid in 2026
- Population: ▼6,437,360 (December 31, 2024)
- Fertility rate: ▼1.72 (2024)
- Immigrant share: 4.4% (2024)

Age structure
- 0–14 years: ▼911,025 (14.13%)
- 15–64 years: ▼4,003,547 (62.12%)
- 65 and over: ▲1,530,909 (23.75%)

Sex ratio
- Total: 0.84 male(s)/female (2009)
- At birth: 1.06 male(s)/female
- Under 15: 1.05 male(s)/female
- 15–64 years: 0.97 male(s)/female
- 65 and over: 0.68 male(s)/female

Nationality
- Nationality: noun: Bulgarian(s) adjective: Bulgarian
- Major ethnic: Bulgarian (85.7%)
- Minor ethnic: Turkish (8.5%); Romani (4.5%); Others (1.3%) mostly other European ethnic groups. Overall, 99% of Bulgaria population is European, with non-European ethnic groups accounting for less than 1%

Language
- Official: Bulgarian (86.2%)

The demography of the Republic of Bulgaria is monitored by the National Statistical Institute of Bulgaria. Demographic features of the population of Bulgaria include population density, ethnicity, education level, health of the populace, economic status, religious affiliations and others.

The population of Bulgaria was around 6.4 million in 2024.

In 2023, Bulgaria had a Human Development Index of 0.845, which corresponds to "very high human development", ranking 55th in the world together with neighbouring Romania, was designated as a "High-income economy" by the World Bank, with a GNI per capita of $15,320, as of 2024, and was awarded the 38th position in Newsweek's rankings of the world's best countries to live in, measuring health, education, political environment and economic dynamism in 2010.

== Demographic history ==
Census population and average annual growth rate
Year	Pop.	±% p.a.
1880	2,007,919	—
1887	3,154,375	+6.67%
1892	3,310,713	+0.97%
1900	3,744,283	+1.55%
1905	4,035,575	+1.51%
1910	4,337,513	+1.45%
1920	4,846,971	+1.12%
1926	5,478,741	+2.06%
1934	6,077,939	+1.31%
1946	7,029,349	+1.22%
1956	7,613,709	+0.80%
1965	8,227,866	+0.87%
1975	8,727,771	+0.59%
1985	8,948,649	+0.25%
1992	8,487,317	−0.75%
2001	7,928,901	−0.75%
2011	7,364,570	−0.74%
2021	6,519,789	−1.21%
Source: Demographic history of Bulgaria

Various estimates have put Bulgaria's medieval population at 1.1 million in 700 AD and 2.6 million in 1365. At the 2011 census, the population inhabiting Bulgaria was 7,364,570 in total, but the 2021 census calculated that the population had declined to 6.5 million. The peak was in 1989, the year when the borders opened after a half of a century of communist regime, when the population numbered 9,009,018.

Historical population of Bulgaria, 1812 to 2023

Note: Crude migration change (per 1000) is an extrapolation (Note: Crude migration change % is a trend analysis, an extrapolation, based on calculation of the average population change (current year minus previous) minus natural change of the current year (see table vital statistics). As average population is an estimate of the population in the middle of the year and not end of the year, crude migration is thus an extrapolation.)

== Vital statistics ==
=== Vital Statistics 1875 to 1899 ===
The total fertility rate is the number of children born per woman. It is based on fairly good data for the entire period. Sources: Our World in Data and Gapminder Foundation.

Years	1875	1876	1877	1878	1879	1880
Total Fertility Rate in Bulgaria	5.16	5.05	4.95	4.84	4.73	4.62

Years	1881	1882	1883	1884	1885	1886	1887	1888	1889	1890
Total Fertility Rate in Bulgaria	4.52	4.92	5.16	5.16	5.04	4.37	5.15	5.05	4.92	4.7

Years	1891	1892	1893	1894	1895	1896	1897	1898	1899
Total Fertility Rate in Bulgaria	5.24	4.82	4.69	5.09	5.45	5.55	5.7	5.28	5.45

=== Vital statistics 1900 to present ===
Notable events in Bulgarian demography:

- 1912–1913 – Balkan Wars
- 1915–1918 – First World War
- 1989–1990 – End of the People's Republic and 1989 expulsion of Turks from Bulgaria
- 2020–2023 – COVID-19 pandemic

	Average population	Live births	Deaths	Natural change	Crude birth rate (per 1000)	Crude death rate (per 1000)	Natural change (per 1000)	Crude migration rate (per 1000)	Total fertility rate (Note: In fertility rates, 2.1 and above is a stable population and has been marked blue, 2 and below leads to an aging population and the result is that the population decreases.)
1900	3,710,000	157,000	84,000	73,000	42.3	22.6	19.7		5.67
1901	3,740,000	141,000	87,000	54,000	37.7	23.3	14.4		5.70
1902	3,800,000	149,000	91,000	58,000	39.2	23.9	15.3		5.73
1903	3,850,000	159,000	88,000	71,000	41.3	22.9	18.4		5.76
1904	3,910,000	167,000	84,000	83,000	42.7	21.5	21.2		5.80
1905	4,000,000	174,000	87,000	87,000	43.5	21.8	21.8		5.83
1906	4,100,000	179,000	91,000	88,000	43.7	22.2	21.5		5.77
1907	4,150,000	180,000	92,000	88,000	43.4	22.2	21.2		5.72
1908	4,200,000	169,000	102,000	67,000	40.2	24.3	16.0		5.66
1909	4,280,000	173,000	113,000	60,000	40.4	26.4	14.0		5.6
1910	4,350,000	180,000	100,000	80,000	41.4	23.0	18.4		5.55
1911	4,400,000	176,000	94,000	82,000	40.0	21.4	18.6		5.52
1912	4,430,000	185,000	91,000	94,000	41.8	20.5	21.2		5.48
1913	4,200,000	108,000	122,000	−14,000	25.7	29.0	−3.3		5.45
1914	4,240,000	191,000	88,000	103,000	45.0	20.8	24.3		5.42
1915	4,280,000	172,000	85,000	87,000	40.2	19.9	20.3		5.39
1916	4,660,000	99,000	97,000	2,000	21.2	20.8	0.4		5.38
1917	4,690,000	81,000	99,000	−18,000	17.3	21.1	−3.8		5.37
1918	4,740,000	100,000	152,000	−52,000	21.1	32.1	−11.0		5.36
1919	4,790,000	157,000	97,000	60,000	32.8	20.3	12.5		5.35
1920	4,850,000	193,000	104,000	89,000	39.8	21.4	18.4		5.35
1921	4,890,000	197,000	106,000	91,000	40.3	21.7	18.6		5.27
1922	5,010,000	203,000	106,000	97,000	40.5	21.2	19.4		5.19
1923	5,090,000	192,000	108,000	84,000	37.7	21.2	16.5		5.11
1924	5,210,000	207,000	108,000	99,000	39.7	20.7	19.0		5.03
1925	5,310,000	196,000	102,000	94,000	36.9	19.2	17.7		4.94
1926	5,420,000	203,000	93,000	110,000	37.5	17.2	20.3		4.80
1927	5,510,000	183,000	112,000	71,000	33.2	20.3	12.9		4.65
1928	5,590,000	185,000	99,000	86,000	33.1	17.7	15.4		4.50
1929	5,670,000	173,000	103,000	70,000	30.5	18.2	12.3		4.36
1930	5,740,000	180,000	93,000	87,000	31.4	16.2	15.2		4.05
1931	5,800,000	171,000	98,000	73,000	29.5	16.9	12.6		3.80
1932	5,884,000	186,000	96,000	90,000	31.6	16.3	15.3		4.07
1933	5,961,000	174,000	93,000	81,000	29.2	15.6	13.6		3.76
1934	6,039,000	181,795	85,046	96,749	30.1	14.1	16.0		3.88
1935	6,102,000	160,951	89,086	71,865	26.4	14.6	11.8		3.39
1936	6,154,000	159,146	87,723	71,423	25.9	14.3	11.6		3.33
1937	6,196,000	150,771	84,674	66,097	24.3	13.7	10.7		3.12
1938	6,244,000	142,415	85,373	57,042	22.8	13.7	9.1		2.92
1939	6,292,000	138,883	84,150	54,733	22.1	13.4	8.7		2.81
1940	6,341,000	140,564	85,046	55,518	22.2	13.4	8.8		2.84
1941	6,715,100	147,293	85,011	62,282	21.9	12.7	9.3		2.80
1942	6,771,000	153,272	88,082	65,190	22.6	13.0	9.6	−1,4	2.91
1943	6,827,000	148,840	88,386	60,454	21.8	13.0	8.9	−0.6	2.79
1944	6,884,000	151,013	94,082	56,931	22.0	13.7	8.3	0	2.83
1945	6,942,000	166,960	103,591	63,369	24.1	14.9	9.1	−0.8	3.09
1946	7,000,000	179,226	95,799	83,427	25.6	13.7	11.9	−3.7	3.29
1947	7,063,000	169,501	94,395	75,106	24.0	13.4	10.7	−1.7	3.06
1948	7,130,000	175,771	89,927	85,844	24.7	12.6	12.0	−2.8	3.16
1949	7,195,000	177,734	84,675	93,059	24.7	11.8	12.9	−3.9	3.17
1950	7,251,000	182,571	74,134	108,437	25.2	10.2	15.0	−7.3	2.94
1951	7,258,000	152,803	77,364	75,434	21.1	10.7	10.4	−9.4	2.45
1952	7,274,000	154,014	84,254	69,760	21.2	11.6	9.6	−7.3	2.44
1953	7,346,000	153,220	68,055	85,165	20.9	9.3	11.6	−1.9	2.41
1954	7,423,000	149,902	68,384	81,518	20.2	9.2	11.0	−0.6	2.36
1955	7,499,000	150,978	67,960	83,018	20.1	9.1	11.1	−0.9	2.41
1956	7,575,000	147,910	71,153	76,757	19.5	9.4	10.1	0	2.36
1957	7,651,000	141,035	65,807	75,228	18.4	8.6	9.8	0	2.26
1958	7,727,000	138,294	60,734	77,560	17.9	7.9	10.0	−0.2	2.23
1959	7,797,000	136,892	73,850	63,042	17.5	9.4	8.1	0.9	2.23
1960	7,867,374	140,082	63,665	76,417	17.8	8.1	9.7	−0.9	2.31
1961	7,943,118	137,861	62,562	75,299	17.4	7.9	9.5	0.1	2.29
1962	8,012,946	134,148	69,640	64,508	16.7	8.7	8.1	0.7	2.24
1963	8,078,145	132,143	66,057	66,086	16.4	8.2	8.2	−0.1	2.21
1964	8,144,340	130,958	64,479	66,479	16.1	7.9	8.2	0	2.19
1965	8,204,168	125,791	66,970	58,821	15.3	8.2	7.2	0.1	2.09
1966	8,258,057	123,039	68,366	54,673	14.9	8.3	6.6	−0.1	2.03
1967	8,310,226	124,582	74,696	49,886	15.0	9.0	6.0	0.3	2.02
1968	8,369,603	141,460	72,176	69,284	16.9	8.6	8.3	−1.2	2.27
1969	8,434,172	143,060	80,183	62,877	17.0	9.5	7.5	0.2	2.27
1970	8,489,574	138,745	77,095	61,650	16.3	9.1	7.3	−0.7	2.17
1971	8,536,395	135,422	82,805	52,617	15.9	9.7	6.2	−0.7	2.10
1972	8,576,200	131,316	84,174	47,142	15.3	9.8	5.5	−0.9	2.03
1973	8,620,967	139,713	81,470	58,243	16.2	9.5	6.8	−1.6	2.15
1974	8,678,745	149,196	85,239	63,957	17.2	9.8	7.4	−0.7	2.29
1975	8,720,742	144,668	89,974	54,694	16.6	10.3	6.3	−1.5	2.23
1976	8,758,599	144,929	88,348	56,581	16.5	10.1	6.5	−2.1	2.24
1977	8,804,183	141,702	94,362	47,340	16.1	10.7	5.4	−0.2	2.21
1978	8,814,032	136,442	92,445	43,997	15.5	10.5	5.0	−3.9	2.15
1979	8,825,940	135,358	94,403	40,955	15.3	10.7	4.6	−3.3	2.16
1980	8,861,535	128,190	97,950	30,240	14.5	11.1	3.4	0.6	2.05
1981	8,891,117	124,372	95,441	28,931	14.0	10.7	3.3	0.1	2.00
1982	8,917,457	124,166	100,293	23,873	13.9	11.2	2.7	0.3	2.01
1983	8,939,738	122,993	102,182	20,811	13.8	11.4	2.3	0.2	2.01
1984	8,960,679	122,303	101,419	20,884	13.6	11.3	2.3	0	2.01
1985	8,960,547	118,955	107,485	11,470	13.3	12.0	1.3	−1.3	1.97
1986	8,958,171	120,078	104,039	16,039	13.4	11.6	1.8	−2.1	2.02
1987	8,971,359	116,672	107,213	9,459	13.0	12.0	1.1	0.4	1.96
1988	8,981,446	117,440	107,385	10,055	13.1	12.0	1.1	0	1.97
1989	8,876,972	112,289	106,902	5,387	12.6	12.0	0.6	−12.2	1.90
1990	8,718,289	105,180	108,608	−3,428	12.1	12.5	−0.4	−17.5	1.82
1991	8,632,367	95,910	110,423	−14,513	11.1	12.8	1.7	−8.2	1.66
1992	8,540,164	89,134	107,998	−18,864	10.4	12.6	−2.2	−8.5	1.55
1993	8,472,313	84,400	109,540	−25,140	10.0	12.9	−3.0	−7.7	1.46
1994	8,443,591	79,442	111,827	−32,385	9.4	13.2	−3.8	0.4	1.37
1995	8,406,067	71,967	114,670	−42,703	8.6	13.6	−5.1	0.6	1.23
1996	8,362,826	72,188	117,056	−44,868	8.6	14.0	−5.4	0.2	1.23
1997	8,312,068	64,125	121,861	−57,736	7.7	14.7	−6.9	0.8	1.09
1998	8,256,786	65,361	118,190	−52,829	7.9	14.3	−6.4	−0.3	1.11
1999	8,210,624	72,290	111,786	−39,496	8.8	13.6	−4.8	−0.8	1.23
2000	8,170,172	73,679	115,087	−41,408	9.0	14.1	−5.1	0.1	1.26
2001	8,009,142	68,180	112,368	−44,188	8.5	14.0	−5.5	−26.0	1.21
2002	7,837,161	66,499	112,617	−46,118	8.5	14.4	−5.9	−2.7	1.23
2003	7,775,327	67,359	111,927	−44,568	8.7	14.4	−5.7	0	1.26
2004	7,716,860	69,886	110,110	−40,224	9.1	14.3	−5.2	0	1.33
2005	7,658,972	71,075	113,374	−42,299	9.3	14.8	−5.5	0	1.37
2006	7,601,022	73,978	113,438	−39,460	9.7	14.9	−5.2	0	1.44
2007	7,545,338	75,349	113,004	−37,655	10.0	15.0	−5.0	−0.2	1.49
2008	7,492,561	77,712	110,523	−32,811	10.4	14.8	−4.4	−0.1	1.56
2009	7,444,443	80,956	108,068	−27,112	10.9	14.5	−3.6	−2.1	1.66
2010	7,395,599	75,513	110,165	−34,652	10.2	14.9	−4.7	−3.2	1.57
2011	7,348,328	70,846	108,258	−37,412	9.6	14.7	−5.1	−18.7	1.51
2012	7,305,888	69,121	109,281	−40,160	9.5	15.0	−5.5	−0.3	1.50
2013	7,160,005	66,578	104,345	−37,767	9.3	14.6	−5.3	−0.2	1.54
2014	7,073,572	67,585	108,952	−41,367	9.6	15.4	−5.8	−0.3	1.62
2015	6,984,225	65,950	110,117	−44,167	9.4	15.8	−6.3	−0.6	1.64
2016	6,894,139	64,984	107,580	−42,596	9.4	15.6	−6.2	−1.3	1.67
2017	6,803,468	63,955	109,791	−45,836	9.4	16.1	−6.7	−0.8	1.71
2018	6,710,798	62,197	108,526	−46,329	9.3	16.2	−6.9	−0.5	1.73
2019	6,616,726	61,538	108,083	−46,545	9.3	16.3	−7.0	−0.3	1.79
2020	6,550,696	59,086	124,735	−65,649	9.0	19.0	−10.0	4.4	1.77
2021	6,507,301	58,678	148,995	−90,317	9.0	22.9	−13.9	1.8	1.80
2022	6,447,710	56,596	118,814	−62,218	8.8	18.4	−9.6	4.2	1.78
2023	6,445,481	57,197	101,006	−43,809	8.9	15.7	−6.8	6.4	1.81
2024	6,437,360	53,428	100,736	−47,308	8.3	15.6	−7.3	6.0	1.72
2025	6,423,207	50,241	99,479	−49,328	7.8	15.5	−7.7	5.5	1.63
2026									1.61 (e)

=== Current vital statistics ===
Period	Live births	Deaths	Natural increase
January—September 2025	36,617	70,120	−33,503
January—September 2026	35,964	68,717	−32,753
Difference	▼ –653 (–1.78%)	▼ −1,403 (−2.01%)	▲ +750

=== Total fertility rates by region ===
2025
Regions	TFR
Yugoiztochen	1.90
Severozapaden	1.80
Yuzhen tsentralen	1.63
Bulgaria	1.63
Severoiztochen	1.52
Severen tsentralen	1.52
Yugozapaden	1.52

== Birth rates and fertility ==
=== Historical birth and fertility rates ===
The first reliable data about fertility and natural increase rates in the Bulgarian lands date back to the mid-1800s.

According to Turkish statistician Kemal Karpat, Non-Muslims, Bulgarians included, in the Ottoman Empire received a remarkable boost in fertility in the early 1830s. Their average growth rate climbed up to 2% per year, compared to zero among Muslims, who suffered from demographic stagnation.

The same trend continued well after Bulgaria's Liberation from Ottoman rule in 1878. Until the early 1890s, Muslim birth rates in Bulgaria hesitated in the low 20s, dwarfed by rates of + 40‰ among Orthodox Christians, while natural increase rates hovered around zero. The ongoing Muslim demographic crisis and the heavy migration to Turkey were the two primary reasons for the rapid decrease in Bulgaria's Muslim and Turkish population between 1880 and 1910, from 28.7% in 1880 to 13.8% in 1910 for Muslims and from 26.2% to 10.7% for Turks.

Muslim birth and natural increase rates started climbing slowly from the late 1890s but only surpassed Orthodox ones in 1924. Nevertheless, it was not the Eastern Orthodox but rather Bulgaria's Roman Catholics that had the highest birth rate during the period, though usually offset by very high mortality rates.

Average Number of Births & Deaths, Average Birth Rate, Death Rate and Rate of Natural Increase in the Principality of Bulgaria by Period and Confession

1891–1894 Averages by Confession
Confession	Live births per year	Birth rate	Deaths per year	Death rate	Rate of natural increase
Confession	Number	‰	Number	‰	‰
Eastern Orthodox	104,749	40.1	78,165	30.0	10.1
Muslims	14,972	23.3	13,924	21.8	1.5
Jews	1,038	36.6	684	24.1	12.5
Roman Catholics	911	40.3	901	39.8	0.5
Armenian Gregorians	210	31.6	173	26.2	5.4
Protestants	49	20.5	35	14.7	5.8
TOTAL	121,929	36.7	93,883	28.4	8.3

1899–1902 Averages by Confession
Live births per year	Birth rate	Deaths per year	Death rate	Rate of natural increase
Number	‰	Number	‰	‰
125,151	41.4	70,608	23.4	18.0
20,071	31.2	15,786	24.5	6.7
1,295	38.5	551	16.4	22.1
1,163	40.7	818	28.6	12.1
383	27.7	298	21.6	6.1
119	26.3	70	15.5	10.8
148,182	39.6	88,081	23.5	16.1

1904–1907 Averages by Confession
Live births per year	Birth rate	Deaths per year	Death rate	Rate of natural increase
Number	‰	Number	‰	‰
148,076	44.2	72,816	21.8	22.4
23,122	38.3	14,041	23.3	15.0
1,288	34.2	518	13.7	20.5
1,321	44.5	785	26.4	18.1
358	28.3	279	22.1	6.2
182	32.2	85	15.1	17.1
174,347	43.2	88,524	21.9	21.3

1909–1912 Averages by Confession
Confession	Live births per year	Birth rate	Deaths per year	Death rate	Rate of natural increase
Confession	Number	‰	Number	‰	‰
Eastern Orthodox	151,155	41.5	82,006	23.0	18.5
Muslims	23,896	39.7	15,892	26.4	13.3
Jews	1,234	30.8	532	13.3	17.5
Roman Catholics	1,361	42.4	857	26.7	15.7
Armenian Gregorians	298	24.1	241	19.6	4.5
Protestants	194	30.1	108	17.3	12.8
TOTAL	178,138	41.1	99,636	23.0	18.1

1919–1922 Averages by Confession
Live births per year	Birth rate	Deaths per year	Death rate	Rate of natural increase
Number	‰	Number	‰	‰
159,843	39.3	85,295	21.0	18.3
24,346	35.2	16,079	23.3	11.9
1,158	26.7	536	12.4	14.3
1,372	40.2	830	24.4	15.8
298	27.5	251	23.1	4.4
198	35.3	92	16.4	18.9
187,233	38.8	103,083	21.3	17.5

1925–1928 Averages by Confession
Live births per year	Birth rate	Deaths per year	Death rate	Rate of natural increase
Number	‰	Number	‰	‰
156,839	34.3	82,220	18.0	16.3
31,575	40.0	17,458	22.1	17.9
1,032	22.2	515	11.1	11.1
1,566	38.8	878	21.7	17.1
646	25.5	434	17.1	8.4
221	32.8	108	16.0	16.8
191,890	35.0	101,613	18.5	16.5

In the 1930s and 1940s, ethnic Bulgarians completed stage 2 of their demographic transition, and crude birth rate among them fell to a mere 23.3‰ by 1946, or twice as low as the birth rate of Bulgaria's two largest minorities, Turks (40.9‰) and Roma (47.2‰). At the same time, due to higher mortality, the rate of natural increase among Bulgarian Turks was almost identical to that among ethnic Bulgarians (12.1‰ vs. 11.1‰), while the rate among the Romani was twice as high (23.1‰).

=== Present-day ===
A total of 64,984 live births were recorded in Bulgaria in 2016, giving the country a crude birth rate of 9.1‰.

Bulgaria has a low total fertility rate of 1.58 children per woman (according to the 2021 Census). This is up significantly from the late 1990s, but still below replacement and not enough to prevent further population decline, especially with emigration. Provinces with large Roma populations (for example Sliven, Montana and Yambol) tend to have higher fertility rates (and higher death rates) compared to other areas, whereas Turkish fertility is similar to the Bulgarian majority. The average number of (live births) children in 2021 was 1.47 for all women (aged 12 or more), ranging from 0.04 children for women between the ages of 12-19 to 1.92 children per women between the ages of 70–79. The distribution by ethnicity shows that only among women who identify themselves as belonging to the Roma ethnic group, the average number of children is sufficient for simple reproduction – 2.25 children, mainly because of the significantly younger age structure and low educational level of this group, followed by the Turkish ethnic group with 1.79 children and 1.41 children for women who self-identified as belonging to the Bulgarian ethnic. The distribution of the average number of live births by religion changes from 1.83 children for Muslim women and 1.82 children for Protestant women, followed by 'other Christian' (1.63), Eastern Orthodox (1.43), Catholic (1.36), Jewish (1.27) and Armenian Apostolic (1.26). Women without religion had an average number of 1.40 children.

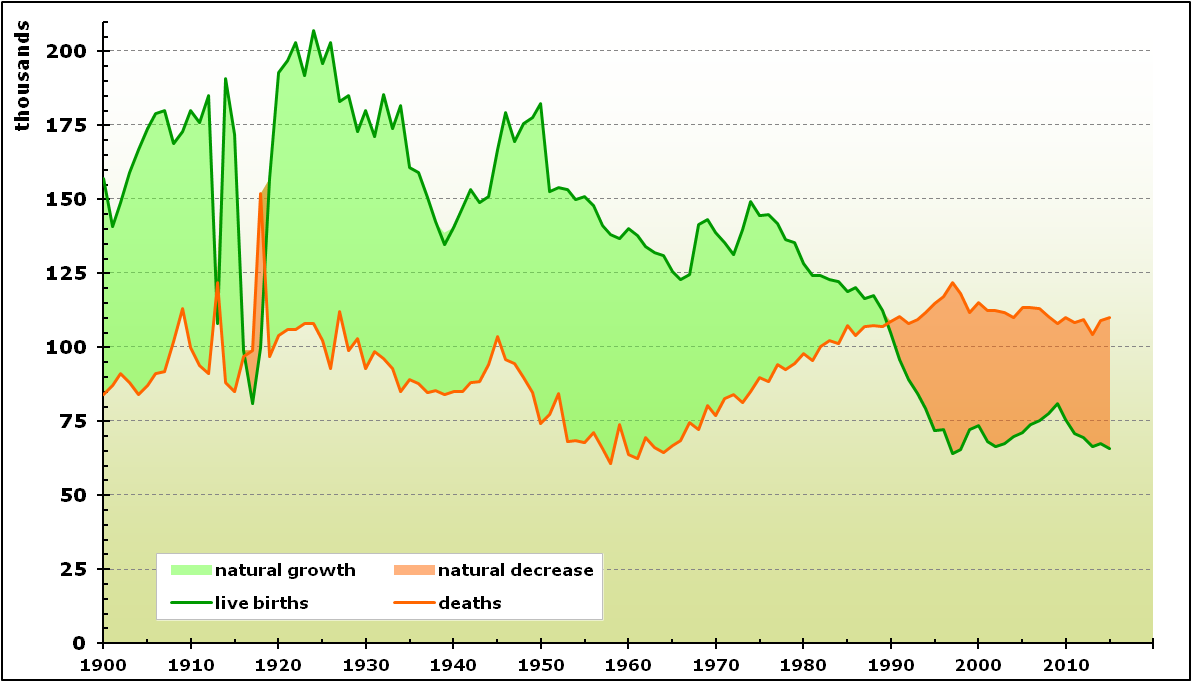
Births and deaths, Bulgaria 1900–2015

Birth rate in 2014

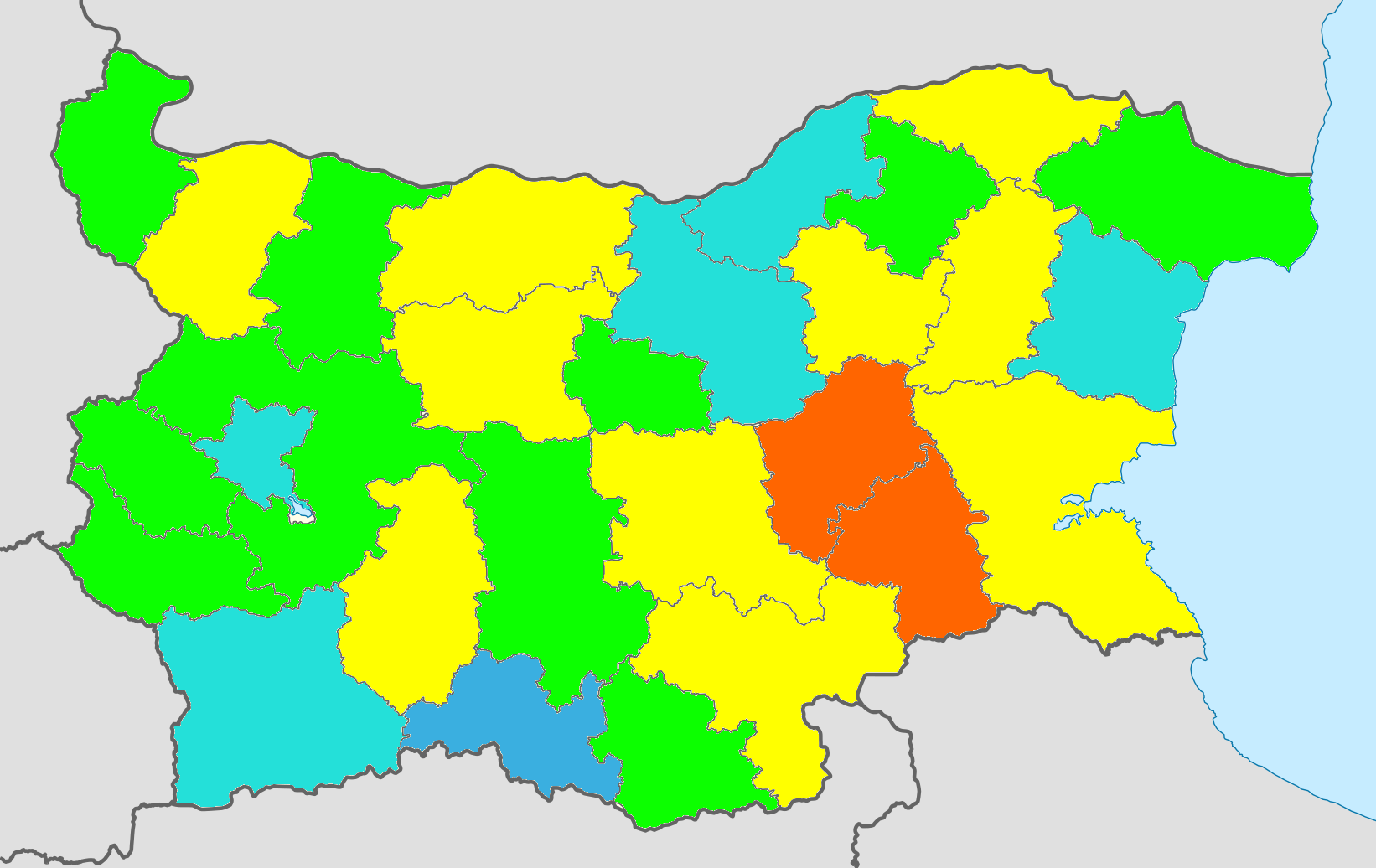
Fertility rate in 2013

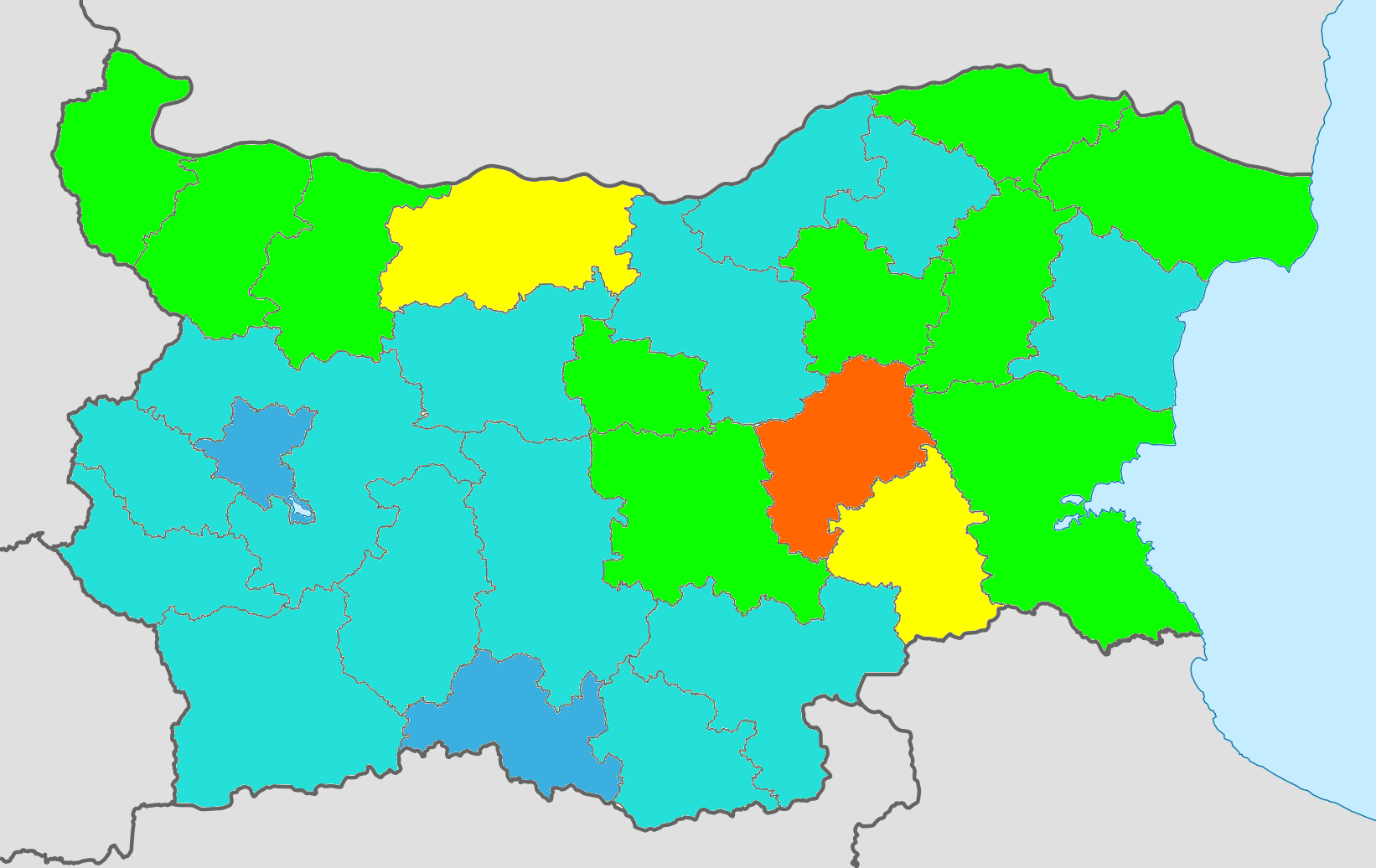
Fertility rate in 2014

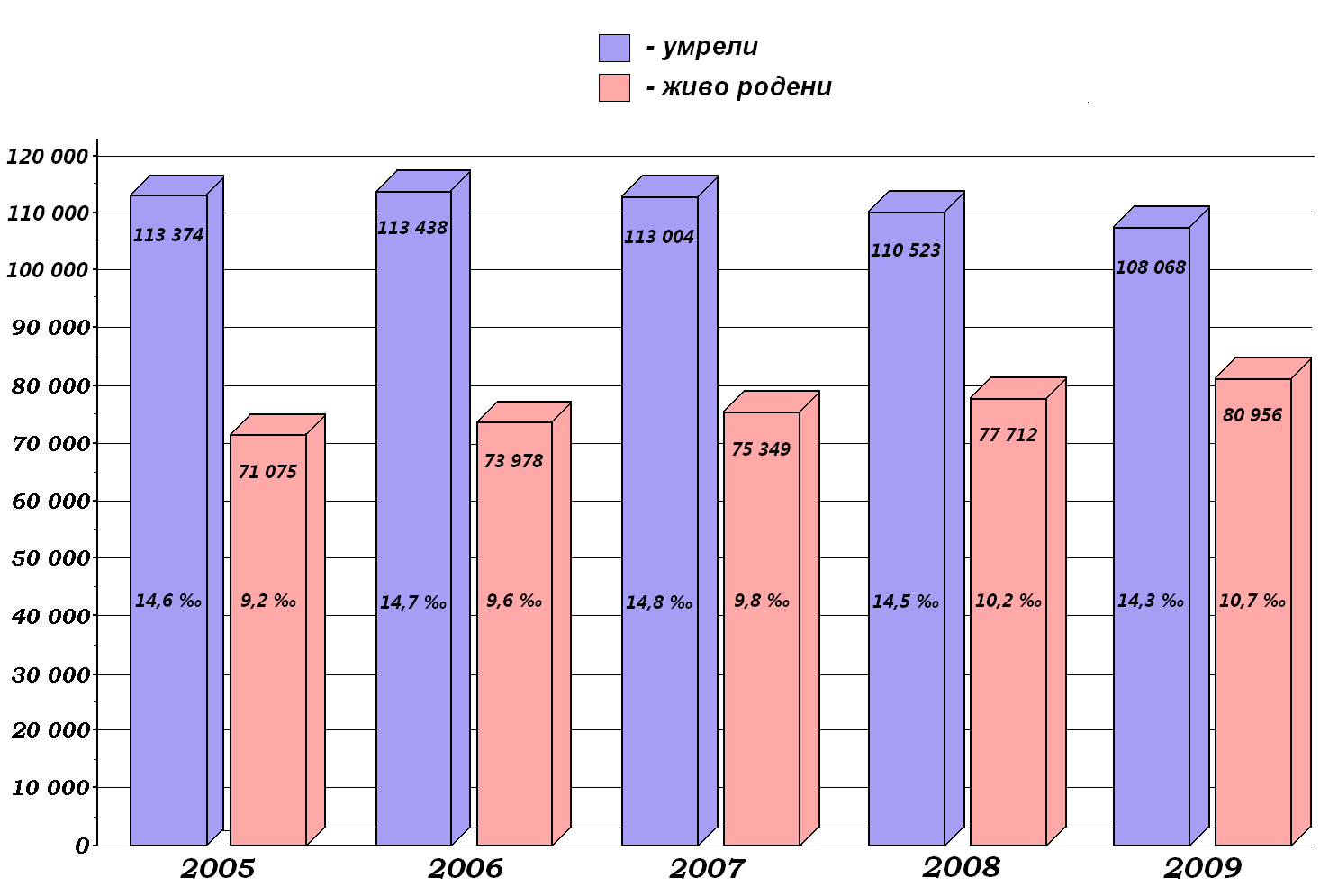
Bulgaria's deaths and births (2005–2009).

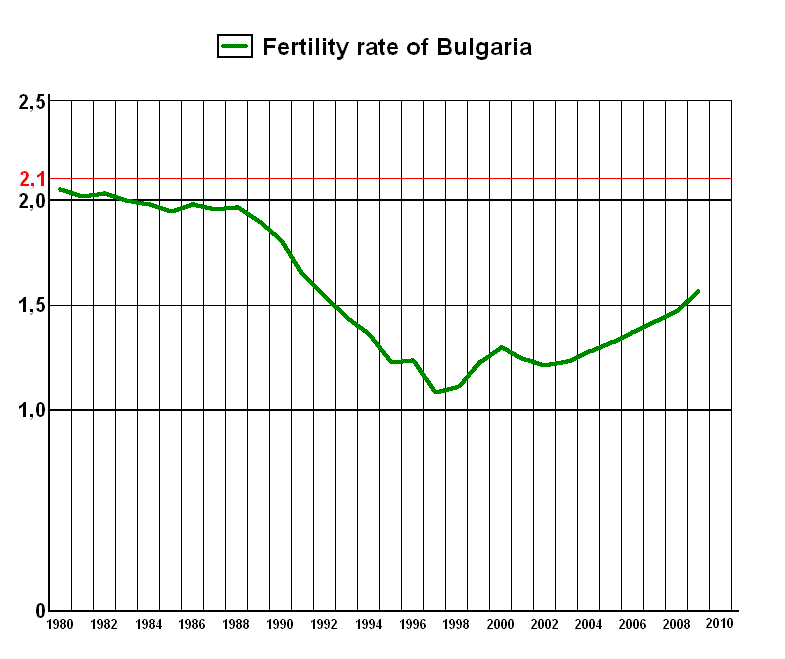
Fertility rate (1980–2010)

Total fertility rate and crude birth rate by province in 2010 and from 2016 to 2024 (NSI)
Province	TFR (2010)	TFR (2016)	TFR (2017)	TFR (2018)	TFR (2019)	TFR (2020)	TFR (2021)	TFR (2022)	TFR (2023)	TFR (2024)
Northwest Region	1.53	1.72 ▲	1.72	1.75 ▼	1.77 ▲	1.75 ▼	1.73 ▼	1.92 ▲	1.94 ▲	1.91 ▼
Vidin	1.50	1.45 ▼	1.58 ▲	1.68 ▲	1.65 ▼	1.45 ▼	1.64 ▲	1.83 ▲	1.92 ▲	1.93 ▲
Vratsa	1.46	1.77 ▲	1.68 ▼	1.81 ▲	1.83 ▲	1.85 ▲	1.76 ▼	1.84 ▲	1.92 ▲	1.92
Lovech	1.58	1.66 ▲	1.79 ▲	1.89 ▲	1.84 ▼	1.91 ▲	1.88 ▼	2.11 ▲	2.06 ▼	2.09 ▲
Montana	1.52	1.74 ▲	1.65 ▼	1.67 ▲	1.62 ▼	1.63 ▲	1.73 ▲	1.87 ▲	1.91 ▲	1.90 ▼
Pleven	1.56	1.80 ▲	1.79 ▼	1.71 ▼	1.81 ▲	1.76 ▼	1.66 ▼	1.93 ▲	1.92 ▼	1.83 ▼
North Central Region	1.32	1.45 ▲	1.45	1.45	1.43 ▼	1.37 ▼	1.43 ▲	1.73 ▲	1.79 ▲	1.62 ▼
Veliko Tarnovo	1.19	1.40 ▲	1.43 ▲	1.34 ▼	1.27 ▼	1.25 ▼	1.35 ▲	1.69 ▲	1.74 ▲	1.57 ▼
Gabrovo	1.43	1.41 ▼	1.49 ▲	1.58 ▲	1.69 ▲	1.46 ▼	1.43 ▼	1.86 ▲	1.79 ▼	1.71 ▼
Razgrad	1.37	1.49 ▲	1.48 ▼	1.65 ▲	1.60 ▼	1.50 ▼	1.53 ▲	1.70 ▲	1.77 ▲	1.50 ▼
Ruse	1.34	1.40 ▲	1.37 ▼	1.41 ▲	1.30 ▼	1.34 ▲	1.40 ▲	1.60 ▲	1.71 ▲	1.62 ▼
Silistra	1.49	1.77 ▲	1.71 ▼	1.55 ▼	1.76 ▲	1.58 ▼	1.60 ▲	2.01 ▲	2.08 ▲	1.86 ▼
Northeast Region	1.53	1.50 ▼	1.48 ▼	1.49 ▲	1.52 ▲	1.45 ▼	1.46 ▲	1.75 ▲	1.76 ▲	1.63 ▼
Varna	1.57	1.45 ▼	1.44 ▼	1.44	1.47 ▲	1.49 ▲	1.49	1.68 ▲	1.64 ▼	1.56 ▼
Dobrich	1.44	1.53 ▲	1.51 ▼	1.44 ▼	1.56 ▲	1.44 ▼	1.37 ▼	1.78 ▲	1.94 ▲	1.71 ▼
Targovishte	1.67	1.59 ▼	1.57 ▼	1.63 ▲	1.61 ▼	1.41 ▼	1.46 ▲	1.91 ▲	1.93 ▲	1.88 ▼
Shumen	1.42	1.54 ▲	1.45 ▼	1.53 ▲	1.51 ▼	1.35 ▼	1.39 ▲	1.92 ▲	1.87 ▼	1.67 ▼
Southeast Region	1.67	1.82 ▲	1.88 ▲	1.84 ▼	1.87 ▲	1.82 ▼	1.82	2.01 ▲	2.14 ▲	2.03 ▼
Burgas	1.54	1.63 ▲	1.65 ▲	1.61 ▼	1.69 ▲	1.59 ▼	1.57 ▼	1.76 ▲	1.88 ▲	1.70 ▼
Sliven	1.95	2.24 ▲	2.34 ▲	2.27 ▼	2.35 ▲	2.24 ▼	2.29 ▲	2.57 ▲	2.60 ▲	2.59 ▼
Stara Zagora	1.64	1.73 ▲	1.80 ▲	1.76 ▼	1.72 ▼	1.73 ▲	1.73	1.84 ▲	2.05 ▲	1.96 ▼
Yambol	1.70	1.98 ▲	2,00 ▲	2.13 ▲	2.06 ▼	2.08 ▲	2.07 ▼	2.35 ▲	2.43 ▲	2.45 ▲
Southwest Region	1.42	1.36 ▼	1.38 ▲	1.38	1.42 ▲	1.44 ▲	1.47 ▲	1.59 ▲	1.62 ▲	1.55 ▼
Blagoevgrad	1.46	1.46	1.45 ▼	1.50 ▲	1.62 ▲	1.61 ▼	1.62 ▲	1.63 ▲	1.77 ▲	1.66 ▼
Kyustendil	1.33	1.63 ▲	1.75 ▲	1.76 ▲	1.95 ▲	1.77 ▼	1.76 ▼	1.82 ▲	1.81 ▼	1.78 ▼
Pernik	1.35	1.62 ▲	1.66 ▲	1.73 ▲	1.68 ▼	1.54 ▼	1.67 ▲	1.53 ▼	1.47 ▼	1.40 ▼
Sofia	1.45	1.74 ▲	1.73 ▼	1.80 ▲	1.91 ▲	1.90 ▼	1.92 ▲	1.90 ▼	1.98 ▲	1.90 ▼
Sofia (city)	1.39	1.27 ▼	1.29 ▲	1.26 ▼	1.28 ▲	1.33 ▲	1.36 ▲	1.51 ▲	1.53 ▲	1.47 ▼
South Central Region	1.50	1.61 ▲	1.65 ▲	1.65	1.66 ▲	1.59 ▼	1.59	1.82 ▲	1.88 ▲	1.75 ▼
Kardzhali	1.49	1.64 ▲	1.66 ▲	1.70 ▲	1.74 ▲	1.49 ▼	1.31 ▼	1.78 ▲	1.89 ▲	1.51 ▼
Pazardzhik	1.58	1.72 ▲	1.75 ▲	1.85 ▲	1.81 ▼	1.70 ▼	1.57 ▼	2.02 ▲	2.22 ▲	2.03 ▼
Plovdiv	1.49	1.56 ▲	1.60 ▲	1.61 ▲	1.60 ▼	1.58 ▼	1.63 ▲	1.82 ▲	1.84 ▲	1.74 ▼
Smolyan	1.33	1.45 ▲	1.47 ▲	1.40 ▼	1.49 ▲	1.49	1.48 ▼	1.33 ▼	1.45 ▲	1.54 ▲
Haskovo	1.53	1.70 ▲	1.75 ▲	1.62 ▼	1.71 ▲	1.59 ▼	1.63 ▲	1.82 ▲	1.83 ▲	1.77 ▼
Bulgaria	1.49	1.54 ▲	1.56 ▲	1.56	1.58 ▲	1.56 ▼	▲1.58	▲1.78	▲1.81	▼1.72

=== Regional differences ===
As of 2022, the municipality of Tvarditsa has the highest crude birth rate in the country, at 18.4‰, followed by the municipalities of Yablanitsa (17.9‰) and Nikolaevo Municipality (17.2‰). All these municipalities have relatively large Romani populations.

Top 20 municipalities with the highest birth rate (2021)
Municipality	Birth rate (‰)
Tvarditsa Municipality, Sliven Province	18.4
Yablanitsa Municipality, Lovech Province	17.9
Nikolaevo Municipality, Stara Zagora Province	17.2
Kaynardzha Municipality, Silistra Province	16.1
Ugarchin Municipality, Lovech Province	15.1
Kotel Municipality, Sliven Province	14.6
Nikola Kozlevo Municipality, Shumen Province	14.6
Lukovit Municipality, Lovech Province	13.6
Dolna Banya Municipality, Sofia Province	13.0
Bratya Daskalovi Municipality, Stara Zagora Province	12.5
Straldzha Municipality, Yambol Province	12.5
Gurkovo Municipality, Stara Zagora Province	12.4
Sadovo Municipality, Plovdiv Province	12.4
Nova Zagora Municipality, Sliven Province	12.3
Strazhitsa Municipality, Veliko Tarnovo Province	12.2
Suhindol Municipality, Veliko Tarnovo Province	12.2
Ruzhintsi Municipality, Vidin Province	12.1
Rakovski Municipality, Plovdiv Province	12.1
Devnya Municipality, Varna Province	12.0
Dimovo Municipality, Vidin Province	12.0
Top 20 municipalities with the lowest birth rate (2017)
Nedelino Municipality, Smolyan Province	5.7
Hisarya Municipality, Plovdiv Province	5.6
Kocherinovo Municipality, Kyustendil Province	5.6
Devin Municipality, Smolyan Province	5.5
Gramada Municipality, Vidin Province	5.5
Svoge Municipality, Sofia Province	5.5
Godech Municipality, Sofia Province	5.4
Apriltsi Municipality, Lovech Province	5.3
Novo Selo Municipality, Vidin Province	5.0
Chepelare Municipality, Smolyan Province	4.9
Zemen Municipality, Pernik Province	4.9
Hitrino Municipality, Shumen Province	4.8
Chiprovtsi Municipality, Montana Province	4.7
Borovo Municipality, Ruse Province	4.5
Belene Municipality, Pleven Province	4.4
Tryavna Municipality, Gabrovo Province	4.2
Boynitsa Municipality, Vidin Province	4.0
Nevestino Municipality, Kyustendil Province	3.8
Banite Municipality, Smolyan Province	3.2
Georgi Damyanovo Municipality, Montana Province	3.1

On the other hand, the municipalities of Georgi Damyanovo, Banite and Nevestino have incredibly low birth rates. These municipalities are almost exclusively inhabited by ethnic Bulgarians.

=== Teenage pregnancy ===
Bulgaria has one of the highest share of teenage pregnancy in Europe. Nevertheless, this number declined rapidly between 1995 and 2010, until it stabilized at around 10%.

Number of teenage mothers in Bulgaria in the period 1990–2025
Year	1990	1995	2000	2005	2010	2015	2017	2020	2021	2022	2023	2024	2025
All live births in Bulgaria	105,180	71,967	73,679	69,886	75,513	65,950	63,955	59,086	58,678	56,596	57,197	53,428	50,241
Mothers aged under twenty	22,518	16,278	12,787	10,625	8,411	6,274	6,038	5,970	5,861	5,769	5,820	5,819	5,482
Share of teenage mothers	▲21.4%	▲22.6%	▼17.4%	▼15.2%	▼11.1%	▼9.5%	▼9.4%	▲10.1%	▼10.0%	▲10.2%	10.2%	▲10.9%	10.9%

The ten municipalities with the largest absolute number of teenage mothers for 2022 are: Sliven (371), Sofia (345), Plovdiv (196), Pazardzhik (130), Yambol (123), Nova Zagora (121), Burgas (108), Pleven (110), Tvarditsa (98), Stara Zagora, Varna (83) and Haskovo (81).

Top ten municipalities with the highest share of mothers aged under twenty (2022)
Municipality	All live births	Births to mothers aged under twenty	% of all live births
Gurkovo Municipality	54	25	46.3%
Simeonovgrad Municipality	78	33	43.3%
Ugarchin Municipality	75	32	42.7%
Yablanitsa Municipality	99	40	40.4%
Tvarditsa Municipality	243	98	40.4%
Kaynardzha Municipality	63	25	39.7%
Straldzha Municipality	127	47	37.0%
Maglizh Municipality	101	36	35.6%
Sredets Municipality	118	41	34.7%
Nova Zagora Municipality	371	121	32.6%

== Life expectancy at birth ==
Life expectancy in Bulgaria since 1900

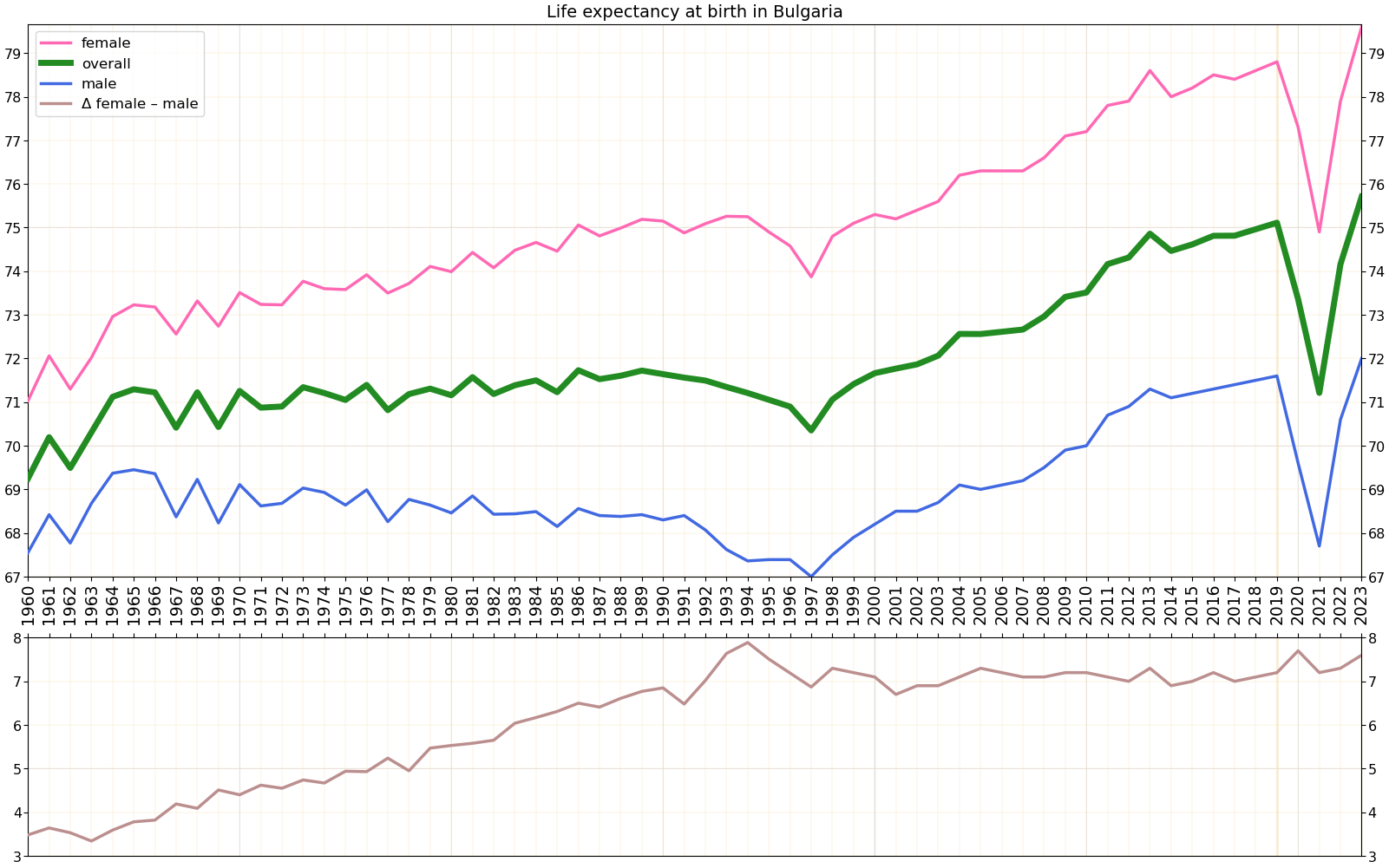
Life expectancy in Bulgaria since 1960 by gender

Total population: ▲74.83 years
Male: ▲71.37 years
Female: ▲78.39 years (2016-2018 est.)

Average life expectancy at age 0 of the total population.

Period	Life expectancy in Years
1950–1955	62.33
1955–1960	▲66.78
1960–1965	▲70.28
1965–1970	▲70.91
1970–1975	▲71.07
1975–1980	▲71.10
1980–1985	▲71.24
1985–1990	▲71.39
1990–1995	▼71.11
1995–2000	▼70.97
2000–2005	▲72.19
2005–2010	▲73.13
2010–2015	▲74.25
2016–2018	▲74.83

Kardzhali Province and Sofia City have the highest life expectancy with 76.6 years for both sexes. The lowest life expectancy is recorded in the Northwestern provinces like Montana (72.7 years), Vratsa (72.8 years) and Vidin (72.9 years).

== Infant mortality rate ==
Total: ▼4.5 deaths/1,000 live births (2024)
Male: ▼5.1 deaths/1,000 live births (2024)
Female: ▼3.8 deaths/1,000 live births (2024)

== Projections ==
The following forecast for the future population is an official estimate of the National Statistical Institute of Bulgaria.

Year	Population
2025	6,263,384
2030	6,007,657
2035	5,801,261
2040	5,637,361
2045	5,505,143
2050	5,391,291
2055	5,287,150
2060	5,189,165
2065	5,099,550
2070	5,025,580
2075	4,971,948
2080	4,937,302
2085	4,919,505
2090	4,915,423

== Demographic statistics ==
Demographic statistics according to the World Population Review.

- One birth every 8 minutes
- One death every 5 minutes
- One net migrant every 111 minutes
- Net loss of one person every 11 minutes

Demographic statistics according to the CIA World Factbook, unless otherwise indicated.

Population
6,519,789 (Sept 2021 cens)
6,919,180 (July 2021 est.)
7,057,504 (July 2018 est.)

Ethnic groups
Bulgarian 76.9%, Turkish/Balkan Gagauz 8%, Romani 4.4%, other 0.7% (including Russian, Armenian, and Vlach), other (unknown) 10% (2011 est.)
note: Romani populations are usually underestimated in official statistics and may represent 9–11% of Bulgaria's population

Languages
Bulgarian (official) 76.8%, Balkan Gagauz 8.2%, Romani 3.8%, other 0.7%, unspecified 10.5% (2011 est.)

Religions
Eastern Orthodox 59.4%, Muslim 7.8%, other (including Catholic, Protestant, Armenian Apostolic Orthodox, and Jewish) 1.7%, none 3.7%, unspecified 27.4% (2011 est.)

Age structure

Population pyramid of Bulgaria by age and sex in 1950

0–14 years: 14.52% (male 520,190 /female 491,506)
15–24 years: 9,4% (male 340,306 /female 312,241)
25–54 years:42.87% (male 1,538,593 /female 1,448,080)
55–64: 13.15% (male 433,943 /female 482,784)
65 years and over: 20.06% (male 562,513 /female 835,065) (2020 est.)

0–14 years: 14.6% (male 530,219 /female 500,398)
15–24 years: 9.43% (male 346,588 /female 318,645)
25–54 years: 43.12% (male 1,565,770 /female 1,477,719)
55–64 years: 13.3% (male 442,083 /female 496,888)
65 years and over: 19.54% (male 557,237 /female 821,957) (2018 est.)

Median age
total: 43.7 years. Country comparison to the world: 20
male: 41.9 years
female: 45.6 years (2020 est.)
total: 43 years. Country comparison to the world: 22nd
male: 41.2 years
female: 44.9 years (2018 est.)

Birth rate
8.15 births/1,000 population (2021 est.) Country comparison to the world: 218th
8.5 births/1,000 population (2018 est.) Country comparison to the world: 215th

Population pyramid of Bulgaria in 2017

Death rate
14.52 deaths/1,000 population (2021 est.) Country comparison to the world: 3rd
14.5 deaths/1,000 population (2018 est.) Country comparison to the world: 4th

Total fertility rate
1.49 children born/woman (2021 est.) Country comparison to the world:204th
1.47 children born/woman (2018 est.) Country comparison to the world: 201st

Net migration rate
−0.29 migrant(s)/1,000 population (2021 est.) Country comparison to the world: 115th

Population growth rate
−0.67% (2021 est.) Country comparison to the world: 229th

Mother's mean age at first birth
27.1 years (2017 est.)

Dependency ratios
total dependency ratio: 56.6 (2020 est.)
youth dependency ratio: 23 (2020 est.)
elderly dependency ratio: 33.6 (2020 est.)
potential support ratio: 3 (2020 est.)

Urbanization
urban population: 75.7% of total population (2020)

.rate of urbanization: −0.22% annual rate of change (2015–20 est.)

potential support ratio: 3.3 (2015 est.)

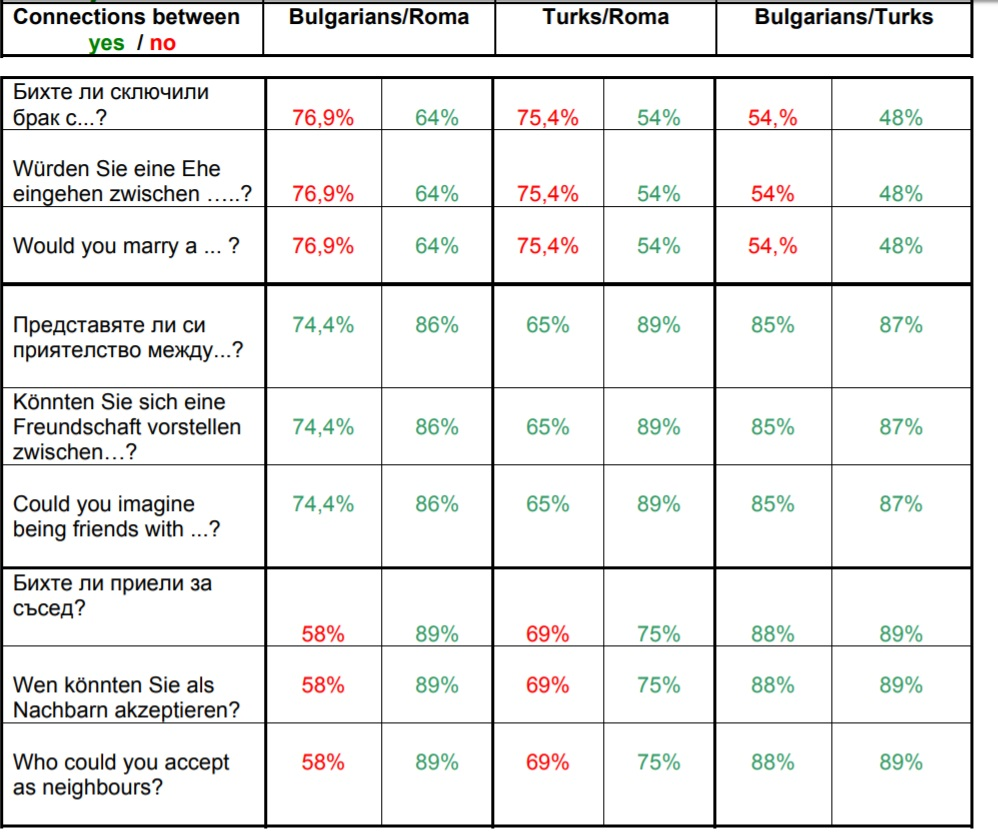
Bias among ethnic groups in Bulgaria

Life expectancy at birth
total population: 75.3 years. Country comparison to the world: 122nd
male: 72.08 years
female: 78.73 years (2021 est.)

Literacy

definition: age 15 and over can read and write (2015 est.)

total population: 98.4%
male: 98.7%
female: 98.1% (2015 est.)

School life expectancy (primary to tertiary education)
total: 14 years
male: 14 years
female: 14 years (2016)

Unemployment, youth ages 15–24
total: 12.7%. Country comparison to the world: 108th
male: 13.2%
female: 13.9% (2018 est.)

=== Sex ratio ===
Of the total 7,364,570 as of 2011, 3,586,571 are males and 3,777,999 are females, or there are 1,053 women for every 1,000 men.

== Demographic policies ==
The progressive decrease of the Bulgarian population is hindering economic growth and welfare improvement, and the management measures taken to mitigate the negative consequences do not address the essence of the problem. The Government implemented a program for the period 2017–2021, the first one aimed at reversing this trend. The program identifies the priority means for achieving this goal: measures to increase the birth rate, reduce youth emigration, and build up regulatory and institutional capacity to implement a modern immigration policy tailored to the needs of Bulgarian business.

== Ethnic groups ==
Population of Bulgaria according to ethnic group 1900–1956
Ethnic group	census 1900		census 1905		census 1910		census 1920		census 1926		census 1934		census 1946		census 1956	
Ethnic group	Number	%	Number	%	Number	%	Number	%	Number	%	Number	%	Number	%	Number	%
Bulgarians	2,888,219	77.1	3,203,810	79.4	3,518,756	81.1	4,036,056	83.3	4,557,706	83.2	5,204,217	85.6	5,903,580	84.0	6,506,541	85.5
Turks	531,240	14.2	488,010	12.1	465,641	10.7	520,339	10.7	577,552	10.5	591,193	9.7	675,500	9.6	656,025	8.6
Roma	89,549	2.4	99,004	2.5	122,296	2.8	98,451	2.0	134,844	2.5	149,385	2.5	170,011	2.4	197,865^{1}	2.6
Romanians	71,063	1.9	75,773	1.9	79,429	1.8	57,312	1.2	69,080	1.2	16,504	0.3	2,459	0.0	3,749	0.0
Greeks	66,635	1.8	63,487	1.6	43,275	1.0	42,074	0.9	10,564	0.2	9,601	0.2	3,623	0.0	7,437	0.1
Jews	33,661	0.9	37,663	0.9	40,133	0.9	43,209	0.9	46,558	0.8	48,565	0.8	44,209	0.6	6,027	0.1
Tatars	18,884	0.5	17,942	0.4	18,228	0.4	4,905	0.1	6,191	0.1			8,133	0.1	5,993	0.1
Armenians	14,581	0.4	14,178	0.4	12,932	0.3	11,509	0.2	27,332	0.5	25,963	0.4	21,637	0.3	21,954	0.3
Gagauzes			10,175	0.3	9,329	0.2	3,669	0.1	4,362	0.1						
Sarakatsani^{4}			6,128	0.2	7,251	0.2	3,075	0.1	2,866	0.0					2,085	0.0
Russians	1,685	0.0	3,275	0.2	2,505	0.2	9,080	0.2	19,706	0.4	11,928	0.2	13,200	0.2	10,551	0.1
Macedonians		–		–		–		–		–		–	169,544^{2}	2.4	187,789^{3}	2.5
Others													15,602	0.2	13,199	0.2
Undeclared	0	–	0	–	0	–	0	–	0	–	0	–	0	–	0	–
Total	3,744,283		4,035,575		4,337,513		4,846,971		5,528,741		6,077,939		7,029,349		7,613,709	
^{1} According to x files of the state, the number of the Romani was reduced by 25,000 in 1956.^{2} In the 1946 census, the population of Pirin Macedonia was forced to list as ethnic Macedonians by the Communist government in preparation of a planned federation between the People's Republic of Bulgaria and Socialist Yugoslavia, with "United Macedonia" as the connecting piece. The deal fell through after Tito-Stalin split in 1948. Since Stalin's death in 1953, Bulgaria started changing its policy on the Macedonians.^{3} In the 1956 census, the Bulgarian authorities favored Bulgarian self-identification of the population in Pirin Macedonia. However, despite presence of pressures by the regime to declare as Bulgarians, the majority of the population still declared themselves as Macedonian. After 1958, the Bulgarian authorities started openly denying the existence of a Macedonian minority in the country.^{4} Note that the distinction between Sarakatsani and Greeks, and between Vlachs and both Aromanians and Romanians, is fluid. Sarakatsani were counted as Greeks in the 1900, 1920, 1926, 1934, and 1965 censuses.

Ethnic structure of the entire population (7,364,570) by most detailed cadastral division according to the 2011 census

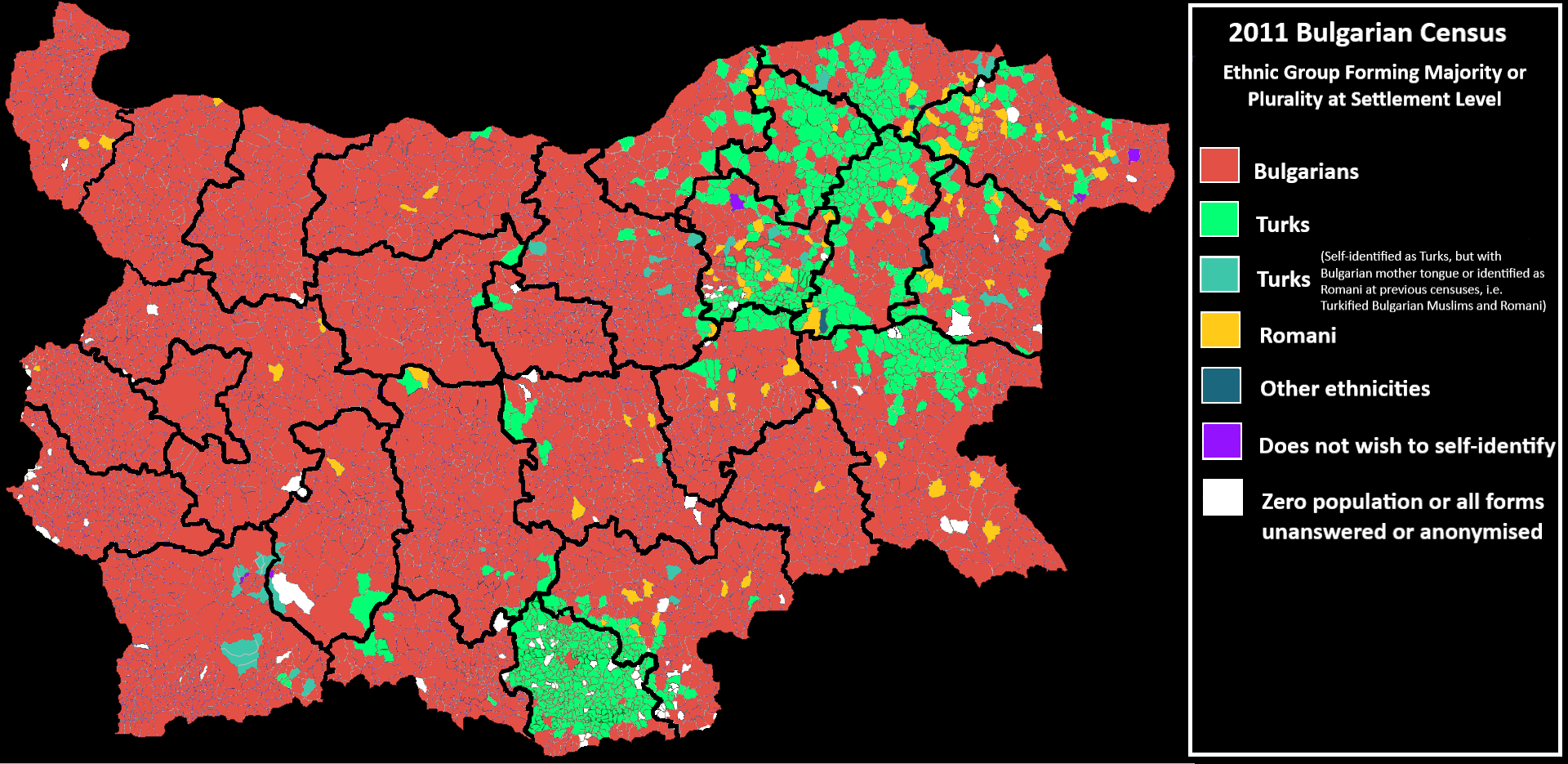
Settlement Level Ethnic Map of Bulgaria Based on the 2011 Census

Population of Bulgaria according to ethnic group 1965–2001
Ethnic group	census 1965		census 1975		census 1985^{1}		census 1992		census 2001	
Ethnic group	Number	%	Number	%	Number	%	Number	%	Number	%
Bulgarians	7,231,243	87.9	7,930,024	90.9			7,271,185	85.7	6,655,210	83.9
Turks	780,928	9.5	730,728	8.4			800,052	9.4	746,664	9.4
Roma	148,874^{2}	1.8	18,323^{2}	0.2			313,396	3.7	370,908	4.7
Armenians	20,282	0.2	14,526	0.2			13,677	0.2	10,832	0.1
Russians	10,815	0.1					17,139	0.2	15,595	0.2
"Vlachs"(Aromanians and Romanians)							5,159	0.1	10,566	0.1
Sarakatsani^{3}							5,144	0.1	4,107	0.1
Ukrainians							1,864	0.0	2,489	0.0
Macedonians	9,632	0.1					10,803	0.1	5,071	0.1
Greeks	8,241	0.1					4,930	0.1	3,408	0.0
Jews	5,108	0.1	3,076				3,461	0.0	1,363	0.0
Romanians							2,491	0.0	1,088	0.0
Tatars	6,430	0.1	5,963	0.1			4,515	0.1	1,803	0.0
Gagauzes							1,478	0.0	540	0.0
Others			25,131	0.3			23,542	0.3	12,342	0.2
Undeclared	0		0				8,481	0.1	62,108	0.8
Unshown	0		0				0		24,807	0.3
Total	8,227,966		8,727,771		8,948,649		8,487,317		7,932,984	
^{1}No data collected about ethnic group in 1985 census.^{2} There are strong indications that the number of ethnic Romani in the 1965 and 1975 census was manipulated.^{3} Note that the distinction between Sarakatsani and Greeks, and between Vlachs and both Aromanians and Romanians, is fluid. Sarakatsani were counted as Greeks in the 1900, 1920, 1926, 1934, and 1965 censuses.

Population of Bulgaria according to ethnic group 2011–2021
Ethnic group	census 2011			census 2021		
Ethnic group	Number	%	(%)^{1}	Number	%	(%)^{1}
Bulgarians	5,664,624	76.92	(85.47)	5,118,494	78.51	(85.70)
Turks	588,318	7.99	(8.88)	508,378	7.80	(8.51)
Roma	325,343	4.42	(4.91)	266,720	4.09	(4.47)
Russians	9,978	0.14	(0.15)	14,218	0.22	(0.24)
Armenians	6,552	0.09	(0.10)	5,306	0.08	(0.09)
"Vlachs"	3,684	0.05	(0.06)	1,643	0.03	(0.03)
Sarakatsani	2,556	0.03	(0.04)	2,071	0.03	(0.03)
Ukrainians	1,789	0.02	(0.03)	3,239	0.05	(0.05)
Macedonians	1,654	0.02	(0.02)	1,143	0.02	(0.02)
Greeks	1,379	0.02	(0.02)	1,625	0.02	(0.02)
Jews	1,162	0.02	(0.02)	1,153	0.02	(0.02)
Romanians	891	0.01	(0.01)	683	0.01	(0.01)
Tatars				1,129	0.2	(0.02)
Gagauzes	40	0.0	(0.00)			
Others	19,659	0.27	(0.30)	46,796^{2}	0.62	(0.78)
Undeclared	736,981	10.00	–	79,513	1.22	–
No return/Data borrowed from administrative sources	–	–	–	467,678	7.1	–
Total	7,364,570			6,519,789		
^{1} Percentages in parentheses are calculated only based on the number of people who answered the ethnicity question (6,680,980 for 2011 and 6,052,111 for 2021) and do not cover people whose data has been collected from administrative databases.^{2}Includes, among other things, 2,894 Englishmen, 865 Italians, 824 Poles, etc. etc.

The following table shows the ethnic composition of all Provinces of Bulgaria according to the 2021 census:

Ethnic Affiliation in Bulgaria by Province in 2021
Province	Bulgarian		Turkish		Romani		Other		Undeclared		Unknown^{1, 2}		Total	
Province	Number	%	Number	%	Number	%	Number	%	Number	%	Number	%	Number	%
Blagoevgrad Province	236,951	81.9	14,028	4.8	12,138	4.2	11,197	3.8	3,768	1.3	13,965	4.8	292,227	100.0
Burgas Province	280,388	73.7	47,286	12.4	14,893	3.9	5,992	1.6	5,805	1.5	25,922	6.8	380,286	100.0
Dobrich Province	109,041	72.6	18,835	12.5	10,118	6.8	2,035	1.4	1,304	1.3	8,813	5.9	150,146	100.0
Gabrovo Province	89,394	90.9	4,723	4.8	792	0.8	735	0.7	1,068	1.1	1,675	1.9	98,387	100.0
Haskovo Province	154,088	72.8	25,555	12.1	12,572	5.9	1,764	0.8	2,254	1.1	15,332	7.2	211,565	100.0
Kardzhali Province	37,383	26.5	83,280	59.0	1,354	1.0	2,130	1.5	4,909	3.5	12,121	8.6	141,177	100.0
Kyustendil Province	101,735	91.0	56	0.0	6,555	5.9	329	0.3	509	0.5	2,552	2.3	111,736	100.0
Lovech Province	103,484	88.9	2,789	2.4	4,999	4.3	407	0.3	2,202	1.9	2,513	2.2	116,394	100.0
Montana Province	99,539	83.0	136	0.1	13,130	10.9	381	0.3	984	0.8	5,780	4.8	119,950	100.0
Pazardzhik Province	184,677	80.4	6,782	3.0	14,320	6.2	4,686	2.0	2,189	1.0	17,160	7.5	229,814	100.0
Pernik Province	107,459	94.1	128	0.1	3,554	3.1	388	0.3	718	0.6	1,925	1.7	114,162	100.0
Pleven Province	200,197	88.5	5,367	2.4	6,999	3.1	937	0.4	1,829	0.8	10,791	4.8	226,120	100.0
Plovdiv Province	513,249	80.9	39,585	6.2	26,296	4.1	5,004	0.8	8,134	1.3	42,229	6.7	634,497	100.0
Razgrad Province	38,873	37.7	49,318	47.8	5,806	5.6	1,957	1.9	1,915	1.9	5,363	5.2	103,223	100.0
Ruse Province	148,845	76.9	23,958	12.4	7,041	3.6	2,060	1.1	2,315	1.2	9,264	4.8	193,483	100.0
Shumen Province	81,907	54.1	44,263	29.2	11,268	7.4	2,118	1.4	1,872	1.2	10,037	6.6	151,465	100.0
Silistra Province	51,579	52.8	34,392	35.7	5,244	5.4	694	0.7	793	0.8	5,068	5.2	97,770	100.0
Sliven Province	115,607	66.9	13,217	7.7	23,918	13.9	1,861	1.1	1,691	1.0	16,396	9.5	172,690	100.0
Smolyan Province	86,818	90.2	3,049	3.2	483	0.5	3,589	3.7	1,609	1.7	736	0.7^{3}	96,284	100.0
Sofia City	1,058,553	83.1	5,881	0.5	13,960	1.1	13,766	1.1	16,086	1.2	166,044	13.0	1,274,290	100.0
Sofia Province	204,662	88.2	342	0.1	11,380	4.9	742	0.3	1,459	0.6	13,404	5.8	231,989	100.0
Stara Zagora Province	239,770	80.9	12,170	4.1	18,158	6.1	2,465	0.8	2,929	1.0	21,015	7.1	296,507	100.0
Targovishte Province	46,455	47.3	34,279	34.9	5,980	6.1	2,828	2.9	2,091	2.1	6,061	6.2	98,144	100.0
Varna Province	352,886	81.6	25,678	5.9	9,634	2.2	7,664	1.8	6,187	1.4	30,149	7.0	432,198	100.0
Veliko Tarnovo Province	178,491	86.1	11,348	5.5	3,655	1.8	1,652	0.8	2,314	1.1	9,911	4.8	207,371	100.0
Vidin Province	68,143	90.4	65	0.0	5,055	6.7	345	0.5	306	0.4	1,494	2.0	75,408	100.0
Vratsa Province	137,587	90.0	424	0.3	10,132	6.6	444	0.3	1,629	1.1	2,587	1.7	152,813	100.0
Yambol Province	90,733	82.7	994	0.9	7,116	6.5	836	0.8	643	0.6	9,371	8.5	109,693	100.0
Republic of Bulgaria	5,118,494	78.5	508,378	7.8	266,720	4.1	79,006	1.2	79,513	1.2	467,678	7.2	6,519,789	100.0
^{1} The category pertains to citizens whose data has been collected from administrative databases.^{2} The online stage of the 2021 Census was subjected to repeated DDoS attacks. As a result, much fewer citizens than expected, especially in major urban areas, were able to take the online census, and the number of hired census assessors proved inadequate to ensure full census coverage in most major cities. Thus, the City of Sofia had a record-high number of no returns, 166,044, or 35.5% of the country total, despite being home to only 19.5% of the population.^{3} The province with most missing returns for 2011 (21.7%), Smolyan, had record-high participation in 2021, with only 736 or 0.7% missing returns.

== Languages ==
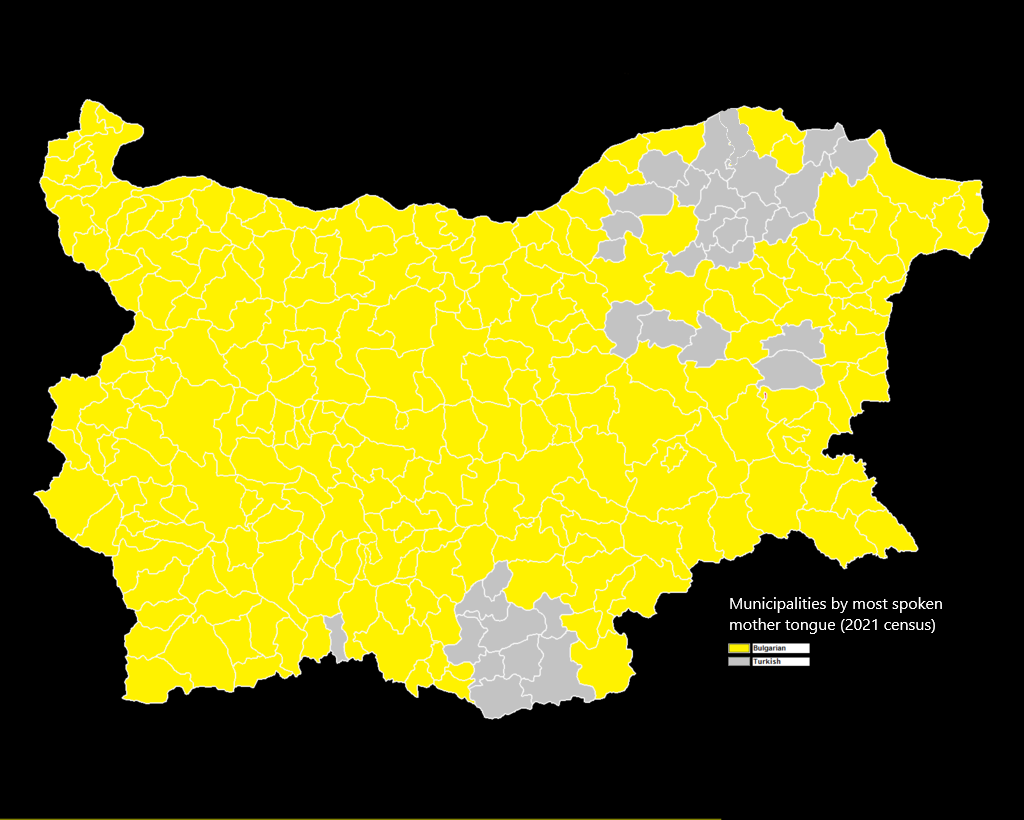
Municipalities by most spoken mother tongue (2021 census)

Monther Tongues of Bulgaria (2021 census excl. undeclared population)
Bulgarian	86.2%
Turkish	8.8%
Romani	3.9%
others	1.1%

Population of Bulgaria according to mother tongue 1880–1892
Mother tongue	census 1880		census 1887		census 1892	
Mother tongue	Number	%	Number	%	Number	%
Bulgarian	1,345,507	67.0	2,326,250	73.7	2,505,326	75.7
Turkish/Gagauz	527,284	26.3	607,331	19.3	569,728	17.2
"Vlach"	49,070	2.4				
Romanian					62,628	1.9
Roma	37,600	1.9	50,291	1.6	52,132	1.6
Ladino	14,020	0.7			27,531	0.8
Tatar	12,376	0.6			16,290	0.5
Greek	11,152	0.6	58,326	1.8	58,518	1.8
Armenian	3,837				6,445	0.2
Serbo-Croatian	1,894					
Serbian					818	
German/Yiddish	1,280					
German					3,620	
Russian	1,123				928	
Albanian	530					
Italian	515				803	
Hungarian	220					
Czech	174					
French	164				356	
Arabic	97					
Polish	92					
English	64					
Circassian	63					
Persian	58					
Others	402				4,425	
Unknown					1,165	
Total	2,007,919		3 154 375		3,310,713	
Territory (km^{2})	63,752		95,223		95,223	

The 2001 census defines an ethnic group as a "community of people, related to each other by origin and language, and close to each other by mode of life and culture"; and one's mother tongue as "the language a person speaks best and usually uses for communication in the family (household)". According to the 2011 census, among the Bulgarians 99.4% indicate Bulgarian as a mother tongue, 0.3% – Turkish/Balkan gagauz, 0.1% – Roma and 0.1% others; among Turks 96.6% have pointed the Turkish/Balkan Gagauz as a mother tongue and 3.2% – Bulgarian; among the Roma 85% indicate Roma language as a mother tongue, 7.5% – Bulgarian, 6.7% – Turkish/Balkan gagauz and 0.6% – Romanian.

== Religion ==
Bulgaria's traditional religion according to the constitution is the Orthodox Christianity, while Bulgaria is a secular state too. Since the last two censuses (2001 and 2011) provide widely divergent results, they are both shown in the table below. It is noteworthy that over a fifth of the population chose not to respond to this question in the 2011 census.

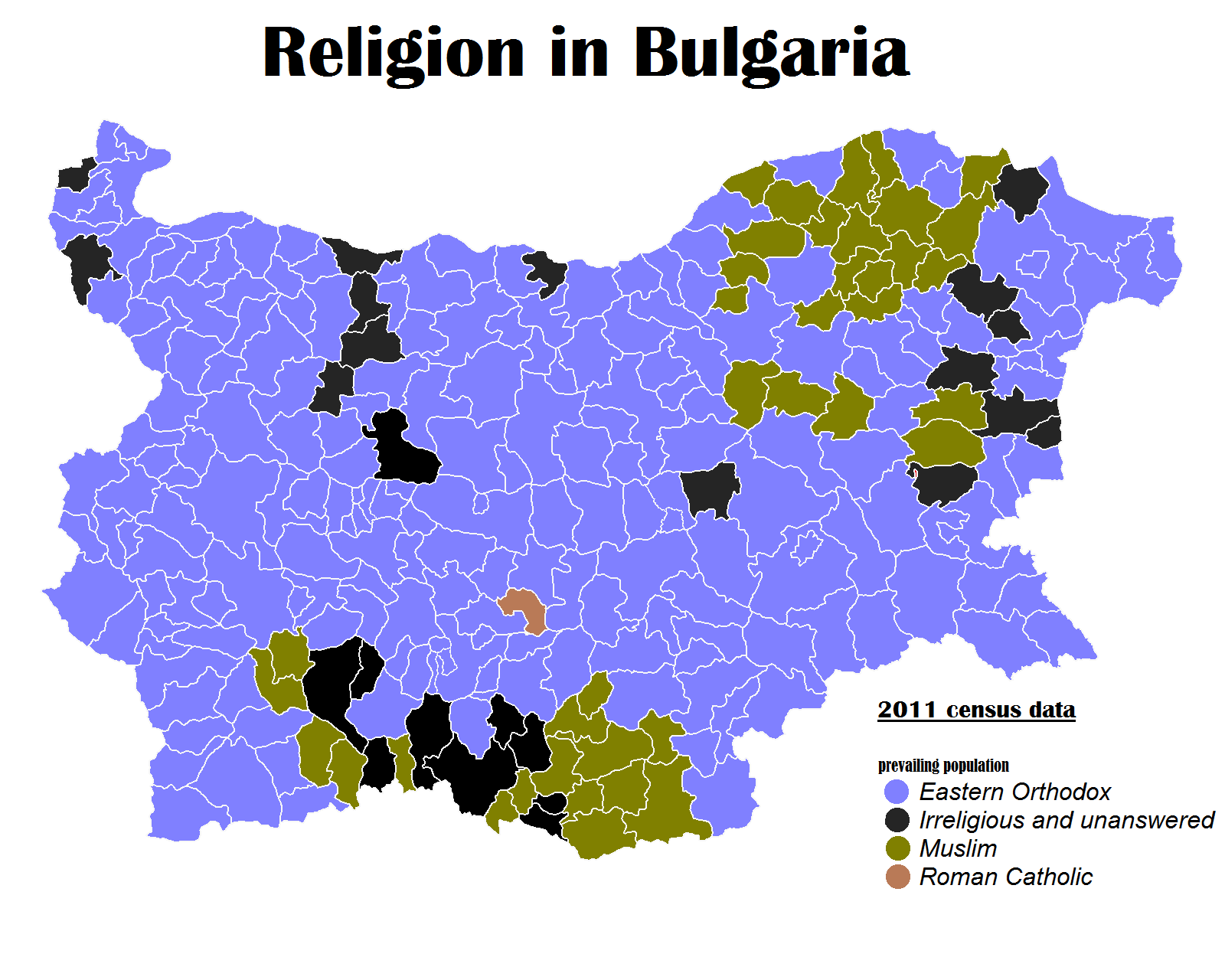
Religious structure of Bulgaria according to the 2011 census.

Muslim areas in Bulgaria according to the 2001 census

	2001	2011
Orthodox Christian	82.6%	59.4%
Muslim	12.2%	7.8% (7.4% Sunni; 0.4% Shia)
Catholic	0.6%	0.7%
Protestant	0.5%	0.9%
Other	0.2%	0.15%
None	3.9%	9.3%
No response	–	21.8%

The results of the Bulgarian 2011 Census, in which the indication of answer regarding the question for confession was optional, are as follows:

Group	Population	% of declared	% of total
Orthodoxy	4,374,135	76.0%	59.4%
Undeclared	1,606,269	–	21.8%
Irreligion	682,162	11.8%	9.3%
Islam	577,139	10.0%	7.8%
Protestantism	64,476	1.1%	0.9%
Roman Catholicism	48,945	0.8%	0.7%
Oriental Orthodoxy	1,715	0.0%	0.0%
Jews	706	0.0%	0.0%
Others	9,023	0.2%	0.1%
Figure of percentage	–	5,758,301	7,364,570

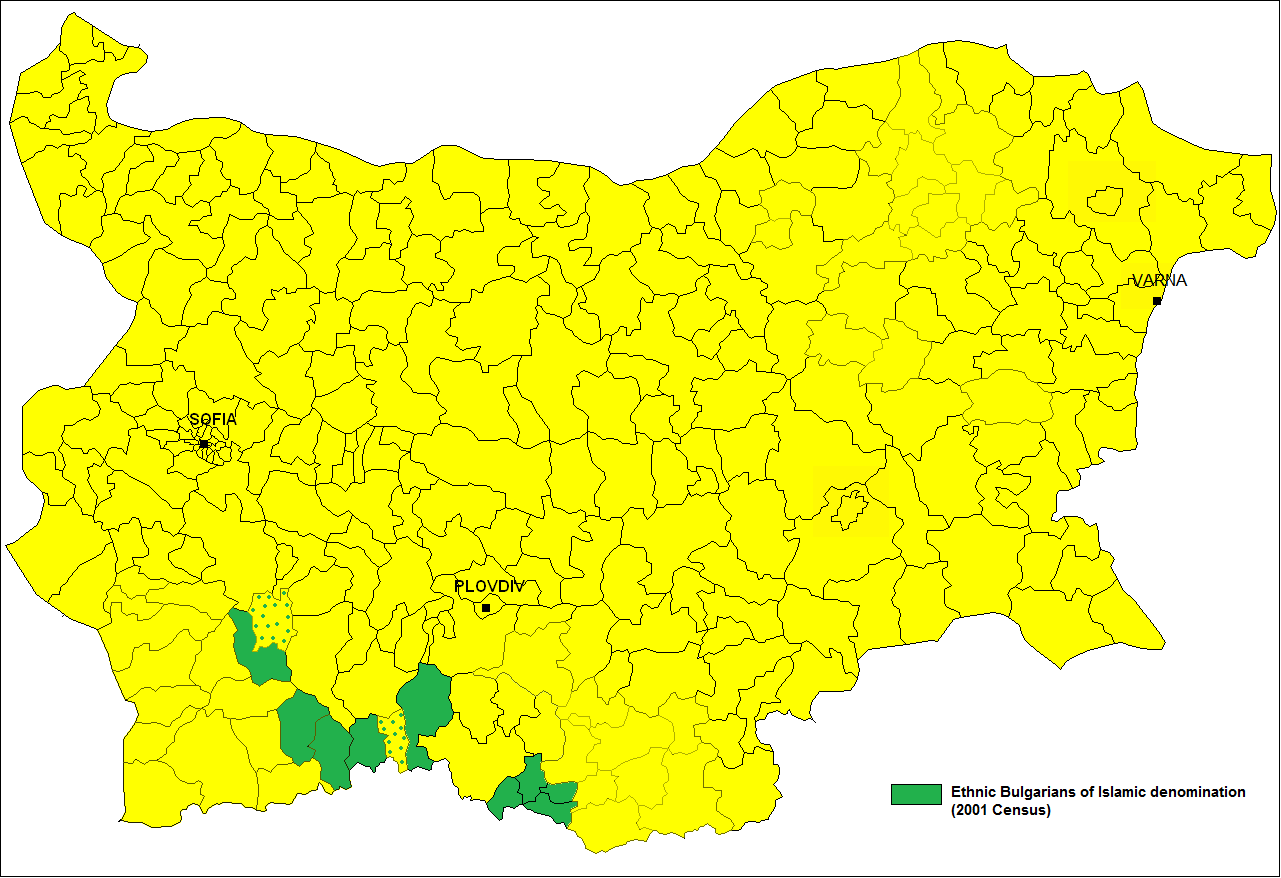
Municipalities where the prevalence is Bulgarian Muslim according to the 2001 census

The results of the Bulgarian 2001 Census by ethnic groups, the latest census in which the indication of identification (whether by confession or as irreligious) in the question for confession was obligatory, are as follows:

Ethnic groups by confession	Total		Bulgarians		Turks		Roma		Others	
Ethnic groups by confession	Number	%	Number	%	Number	%	Number	%	Number	%
Orthodoxy	6,552,751	82.6	6,315,938	94.9	5,425	0.7	180,326	48.6	51,062	
Islam	966,978	12.2	131,531	2.0	713,024	95.5	103,436	27.9	18,987	
Irreligion	308,116	3.9	151,008	2.3	23,146	3.1	59,669	16.1		
Roman Catholicism	43,811	0.6	37,811	0.6	2,561	0.3				
Protestantism	42,308	0.5	14,591	0.2	2,066	0.3	24,651	6.6	1,000	
Others	14,937	0.2	4,331	0.1	442	0.1				
Total population	7,928,901	100.0	6,655,210	100.0	746,664	100.0	370,908	100.0		100.0

Population of Bulgaria according to religion 1900–2021
Religion	census 1900		census 1910		census 1920		census 1926		census 1934		census 1992		census 2001		census 2011		census 2021	
Religion	Number	%	Number	%	Number	%	Number	%	Number	%	Number	%	Number	%	Number	%	Number	%
Orthodoxy	3,019,999	80.6	3,643,918	84.0	4,062,097	83.8	4,569,074	83.4	5,128,890	84.4	7,274,592	85.7	6,552,751	82.6	4,374,135	59.4	4,091,780	62.8
Islam	643,300	17.2	602,078	13.8	690,734	14.2	789,296	14.4	821,298	13.5	1,110,295	13.0	966,978	12.2	577,139	7.8	638,708	9.8
Protestantism	4,524	0.1	6,335	0.1	5,617	0.1	6,735	0.1	8,371	0.1	21,878	0.2	42,308	0.5	64,476	0.9	69,852	1.1
Roman Catholicism	28,569	0.8	32,150	0.7	34,072	0.7	40,347	0.7	45,704	0.7	53,074	0.6	43,811	0.5	48,945	0.7	38,709	0.6
Jews	33,663	0.9	40,067	0.9	43,232	0.9	46,431	0.8	48,398	0.8	2,580	0.0			706	0.0	1,736	0.0
Armenian Apostolic Church	13,809	0.4	12,259	0.3	10,848	0.2	25,402	0.5	23,476	0.4	9,672	0.1			1,715	0.0	5,002	0.1
Others	326	0.0											14,937	0.2	9,023	0.1	6,451	0.1
Irreligion															272,264	3.7	305,102	4.7
Undeclared	93	0.0											308,116	3.9	2,015,258	27.4	731,841	11.2
Borrowed from adm. sources																	616,681	9.5
Total	3,744,283		4,337,513		4,846,971		5,478,741		6,077,939		8,487,317		7,928,901		7,364,570		6,519,789	

== Migration ==
=== Historical migration ===
The first censuses of the Principality of Bulgaria and the autonomous province of Eastern Rumelia in 1880 recorded 31,786 and 17,970 Bulgarian refugees from Macedonia and Ottoman Thrace, respectively, who accounted for 1.38% of the population of the Principality an 2.20% of the population of the autonomous province, respectively. The census of the Principality also counted a total of 37,635 people, or 1.88% of the population, born in a country other than the Ottoman Empire, mostly Bulgarians from Romania, Northern Dobruja and Bessarabia. By 1887, when the first joint census of the Principality and the autonomous province was conducted following their peaceful unification in 1885, the number of the refugees from the Ottoman Empire had grown to 54,462 people, or 1.73% of the population, while the rest of the foreign-born population had fallen to 31,637 people, 9,831 of whom born in the Russian Empire, 11,843 in Romania, 2,690 in Serbia and 7,273 elsewhere.

According to the 1910 census, 300,000 or almost 10% of the ethnic Bulgarians were born in another Bulgarian municipality than the one they were enumerated in. The same data shows that the foreign-born ethnic Bulgarians numbered 78,000, or 2% of them, most numerous of whom were the 61,000 Ottoman-born, 9,000 Romanian-born and by less than 2,000 Austro-Hungarian, Serbian and Russian-born. By the 1926 census, there had been 253,000 refugees with granted households and land or citizenship but with many more in towns of uncertain number. 35% came from Eastern Thrace, 30% came from Greek Macedonia, another 18% from Western Thrace, 8% from Dobruja, 4% from the Western Outlands, 3% from Asia Minor, and 2% from North Macedonia. They constituted 6% of the country's population. In 1940, 70,000 Bulgarians were exchanged from Northern Dobruja. The total number of refugees in 1878–1940 is estimated at between 700,000 and 1,200,000. In 1950–1951, around 150,000 Turks left Bulgaria for Turkey, and again in 1989.

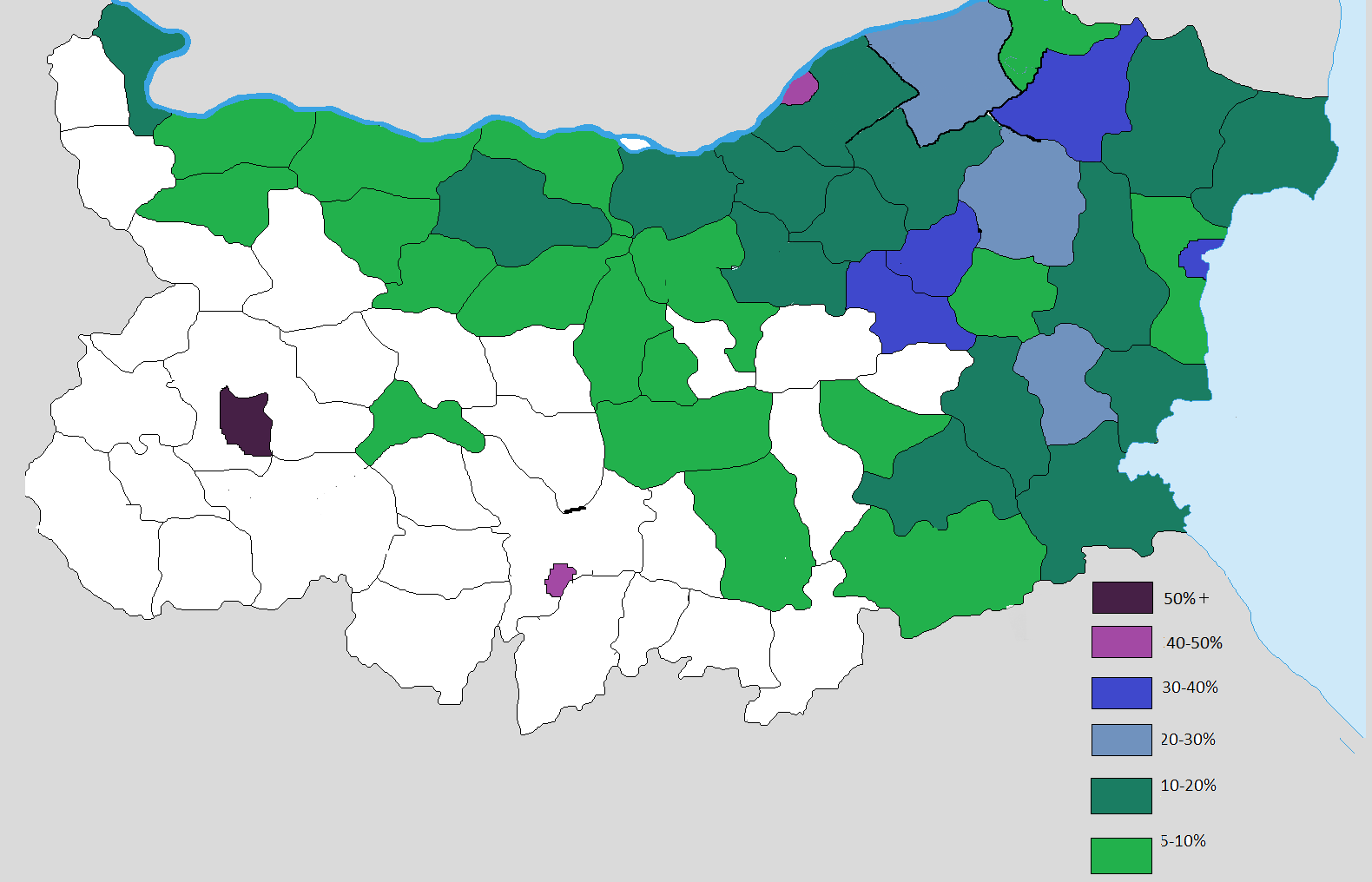
Percentage of Bulgarians born in a different municipality of Bulgaria calculated from the total of the ethnic Bulgarians in 1910

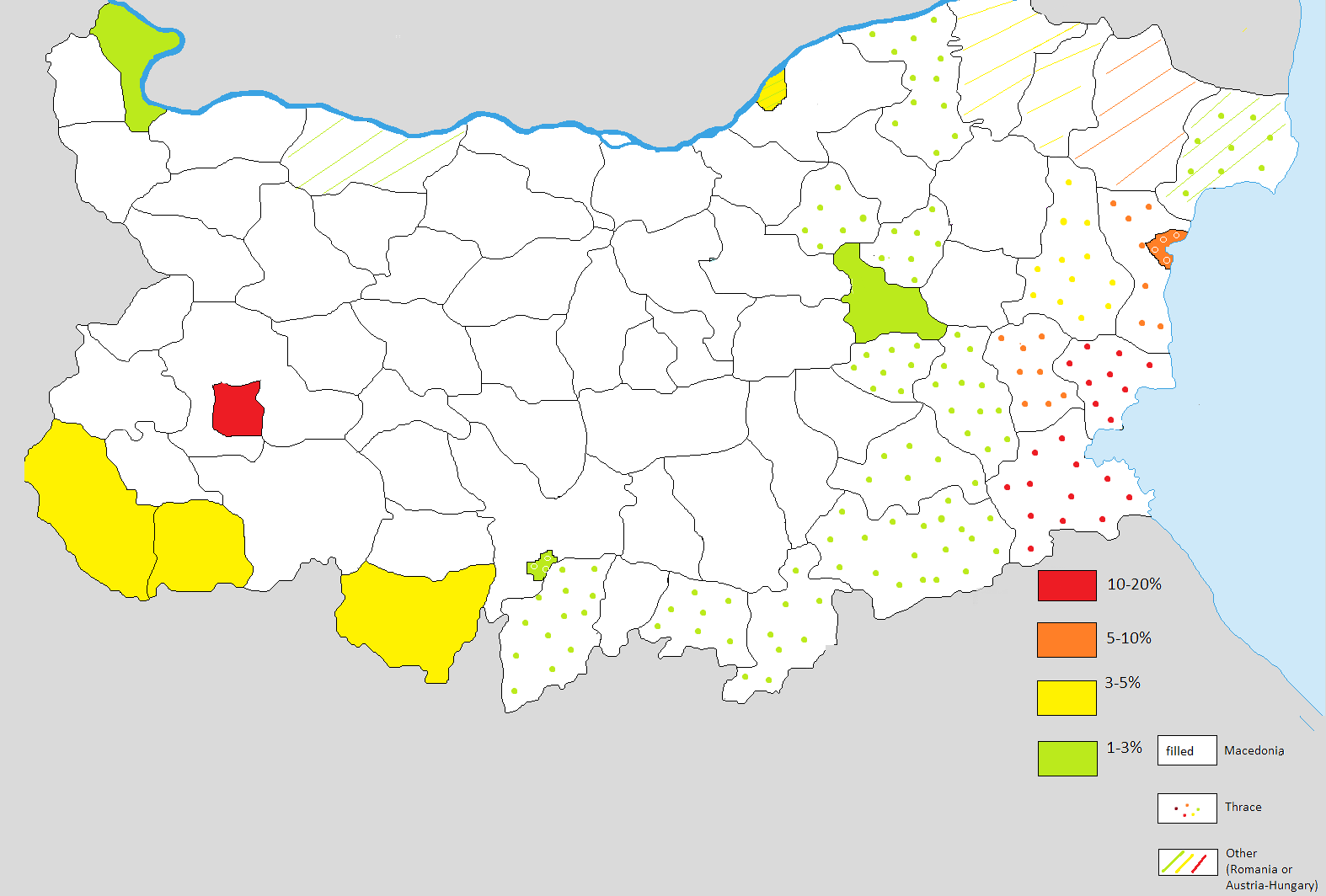
Percentage of foreign-born Bulgarians calculated from the total of the ethnic Bulgarians in 1910

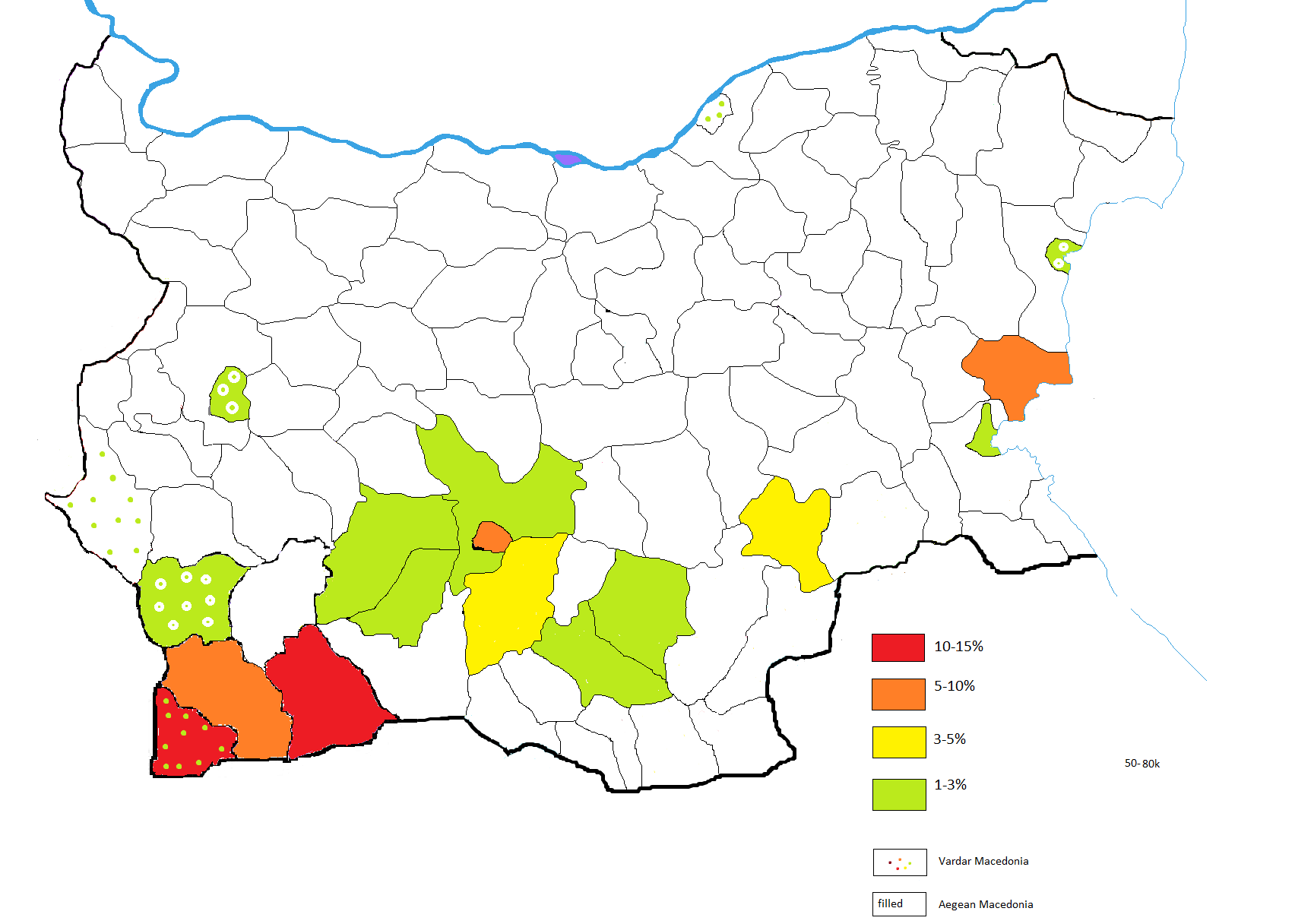
Percentage of Bulgarians born in Greek Macedonia and North Macedonia in 1946 calculated from the total of the ethnic Bulgarians

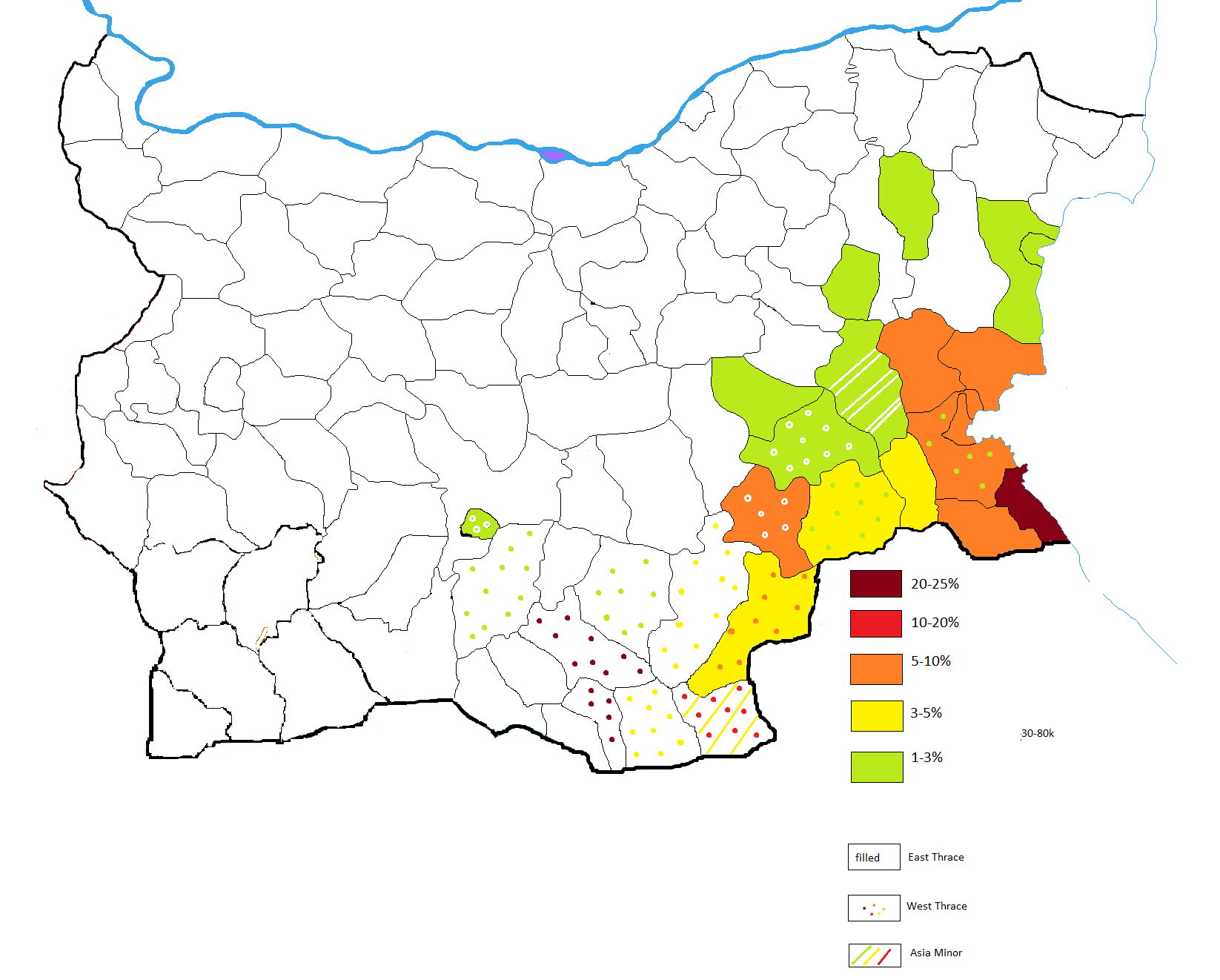
Part of the Bulgarians born in East Thrace, West Thrace and Asia Minor in 1946 calculated from the total of the ethnic Bulgarians

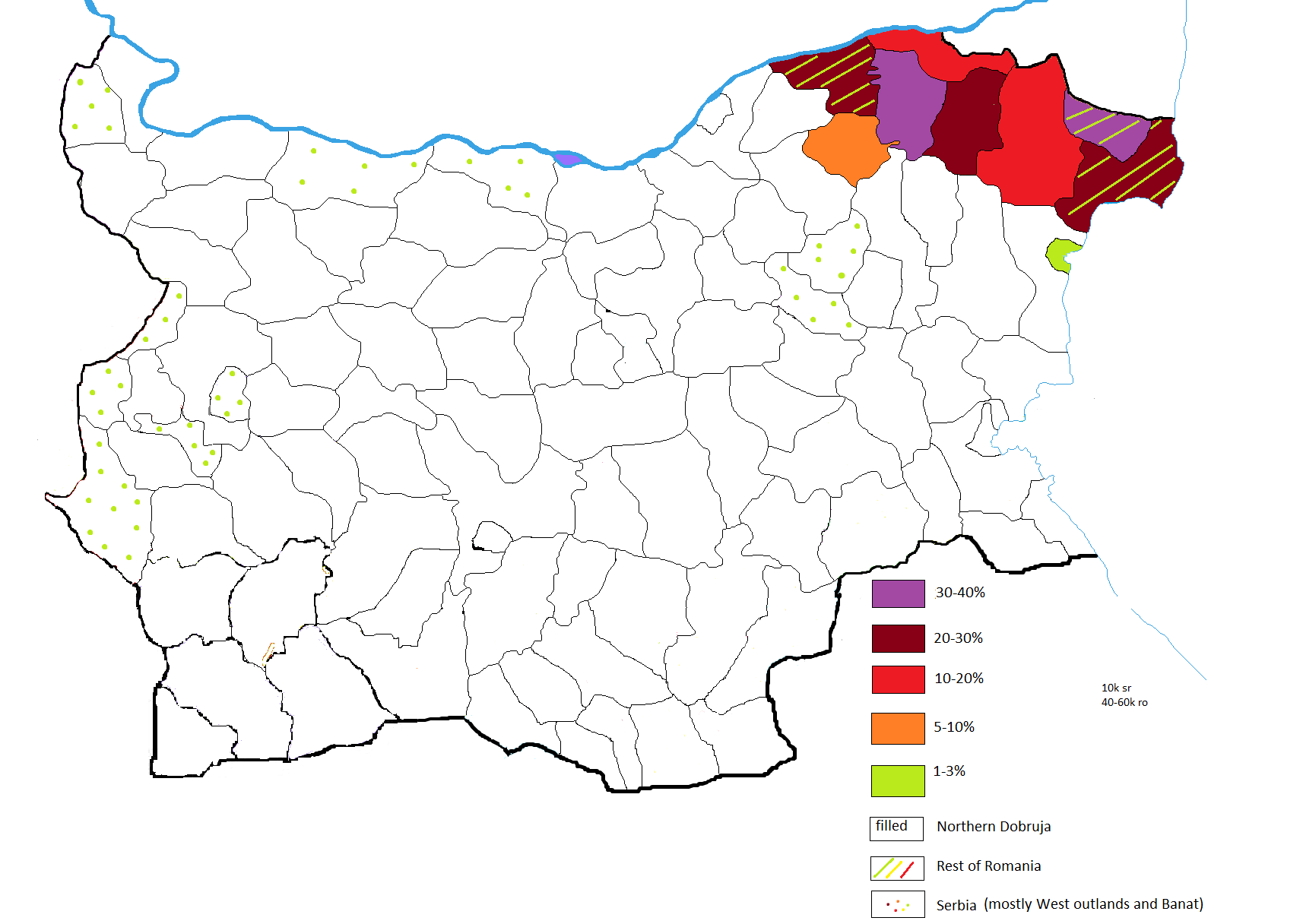
Part of the Bulgarians born in Northern Dobruja, Romania and Serbia in 1946 calculated from the total of the ethnic Bulgarians

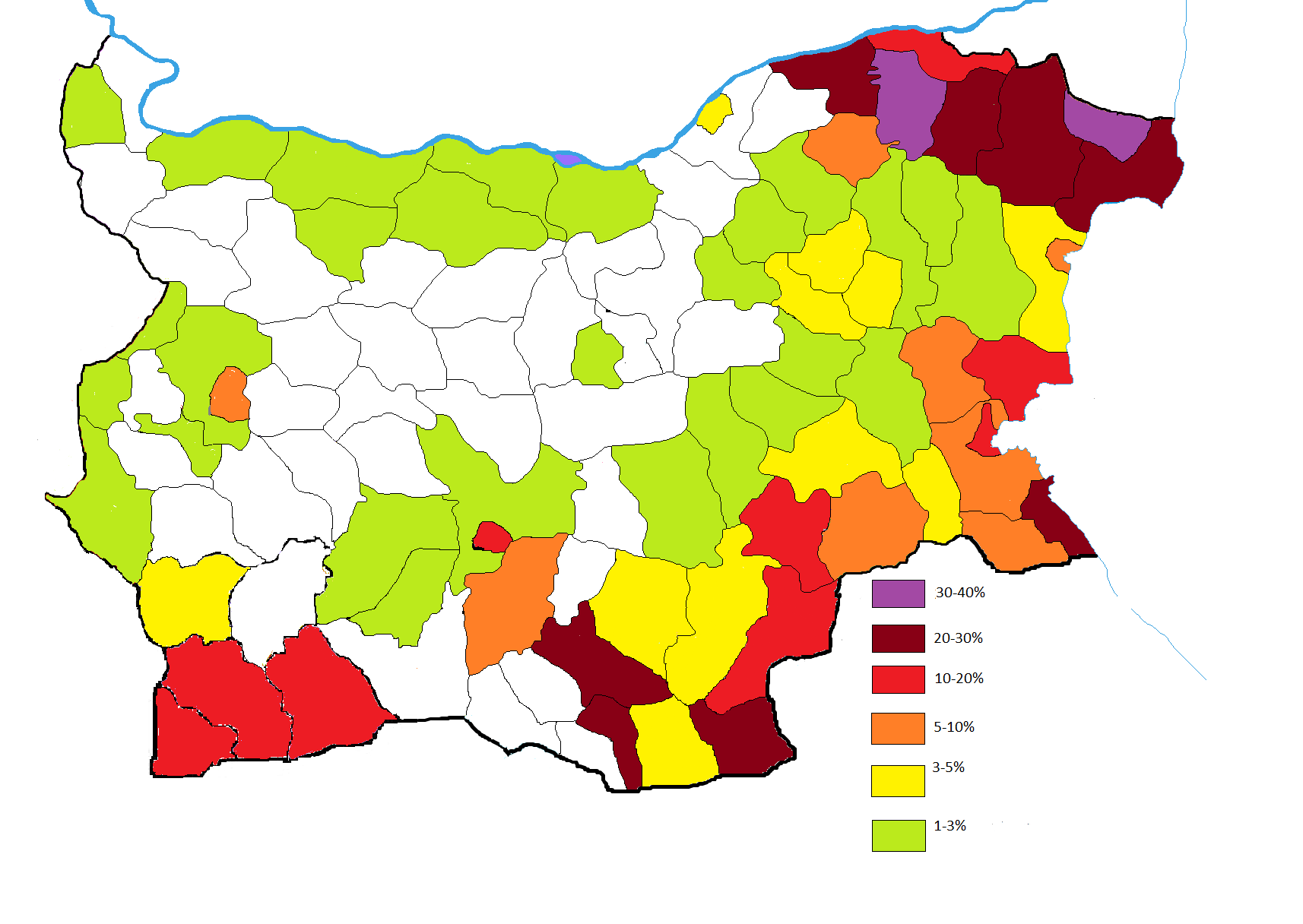
Foreign born as a part of the ethnic Bulgarians in 1946

=== Current migration ===
According to the 2011 census Russian citizens are the most numerous foreigners – 11 991, followed by 8 444 EU citizens (UK – 2 605, Greece – 1 253, Germany – 848, Poland – 819 and Italy – 456), citizens of Ukraine – 3 064, North Macedonia – 1 091, Moldova – 893 and Serbia – 569. 22.8% of them are from Asia, mostly from Turkey. Those with dual Bulgarian and other citizenship were 22 152, or 0.3% of the population. Of them persons with Bulgarian and Russian citizenship were 5 257 (23.7%), followed by persons with Bulgarian and Turkish citizenship – 4 282 (19.3%), Bulgarian and citizenship of the USA – 1 725 (7.8%). There are at least 17,527 Refugees of the Syrian Civil War with applications in Bulgaria. In 2001–2015 185,447 people applied for Bulgarian citizenship and 116,222 were provided with. 113,647 were granted on grounds of proven Bulgarian ancestry, including 59,968 North Macedonia citizens. 29,218 were Moldovan citizens, 5930 Ukrainians, 5374 Serbians, 5194 Russians, 3840 Israeli, 2192 Albanians, 692 Turks and others. In 2016, 12,880 foreigners were naturalized, including 6196 Macedonians.

Permanent foreign residents in Bulgaria by broad geographic region of origin in 2011 and 2021
Nationality	2011		2021	
Nationality	Number	%	Number	%
(Bulgaria) Bulgarians	7,327,847	99.50%	6,459,248	99.07%
Foreigners	36,723	0.50%	60,541	0.93%
(European Union) EU-27	8,444	0.11%	10,549	0.16%
Other European	18,413	0.15%	35,901	0.55%
Africa	429	0.01%	940	0.01%
Central and South America	338	0.00%	518	0.01%
North America	588	0.01%	776	0.01%
Asia	8,403	0.11%	10,466	0.16%
Oceania	62	0.00%	88	0.00%
Stateless	46	0.00%	1,303	0.02%
Total	7,364,570		6,519,789	

Ten most common resident nationalities in 2011 and 2021
Nationality	2011		2021	
Nationality	Number	%	Number	%
Russian Federation	11,911	32.84%	17,465	28.85%
Ukraine	3,064	8.45%	6,163	10.18%
Turkey	2,741	7.56%	3,017	4.99%
United Kingdom	2,605	7.09%	4,484	7.41%
Greece	1,253	3.41%	1,631	2.69%
Armenia	1,167	3.22%	1,048	1.73%
North Macedonia	1,091	3.01%	1,576	2.60%
Germany	848	2.31%	1,797	2.97%
China	749	2.04%	1,683	2.78%
Syria	729	2.00%	2,615	4.32%
Total	36,723		60,541	

Detailed population by country of birth
Country of birth	2011		2024	
Country of birth	Number	%	Number	%
European	7,347,865	99.8	6,389,201	99.1
(Bulgaria) Bulgarian	7,285,927	98.9	6,232,331	96.7
(Russia) Russian	18,725	0.2	32,951	0.5
(Ukraine) Ukrainian	5,877	0.1	23,519	0.4
(Germany) German	2,083	0.0	17,342	0.3
(United Kingdom) British	3,042	0.0	12,409	0.2
(Greece) Greek	4,931	0.1	10,705	0.2
(Spain) Spanish	1,562	0.0	7,278	0.1
(Italy) Italian	1,083	0.0	6,350	0.1
(North Macedonia) Macedonian	2,427	0.0	5,691	0.1
(Moldova) Moldovan	1,893	0.0	4,530	0.1
(Romania) Romanian	6,046	0.1	3,794	0.1
(Serbia) Serbian	2,306	0.0	3,613	0.1
(France) French	562	0.0	3,569	0.1
(Belgium) Belgian	410	0.0	2,802	0.0
(Czech Republic) Czech	924	0.0	1,863	0.0
(Armenia) Armenian	1,472	0.0	1,814	0.0
Other	8,595	0.1	18,640	0.3
Asian	9,394	0.1	29,563	0.5
(Turkey) Turkish	3,957	0.1	17,562	0.3
(Kazakhstan) Kazakh	970	0.0	2,845	0.1
(China) Chinese	860	0.0	1,715	0.0
(Uzbekistan) Uzbek	683	0.0	1,471	0.0
(India) Indian	151	0.0	993	0.0
(Afghanistan) Afghan	298	0.0	927	0.0
(Vietnam) Vietnamese	624	0.0	718	0.0
(Iran) Iranian	263	0.0	682	0.0
(Pakistan) Pakistani	41	0.0	297	0.0
(Tajikistan) Tajik	120	0.0	200	0.0
(Bangladesh) Bengali	629	0.0	117	0.0
(Nepal) Nepali	5	0.0	44	0.0
Other	793	0.0	1,992	0.0
Arabian	3,825	0.1	17,107	0.3
(Syria) Syrian	1,250	0.0	12,249	0.2
(Iraq) Iraqi	666	0.0	1,009	0.0
(Lebanon) Lebanese	618	0.0	1,118	0.0
(Algeria) Algerian	385	0.0	211	0.0
Other	906	0.0	2,520	0.0
African	1,061	0.0	1,955	0.0
Sub-Saharan	624	0.0	1,383	0.0
Caribbean	437	0.0	572	0.0
Latin American	434	0.0	1,100	0.0
(Brazil) Brazilian	91	0.0	291	0.0
(Argentina) Argentinian	118	0.0	164	0.0
(Mexico) Mexican	25	0.0	134	0.0
(Colombia) Colombian	23	0.0	116	0.0
Other	177	0.0	395	0.0
Other	1,903	0.0	5,181	0.1
(United States) American	1,182	0.0	3,279	0.0
(Israel) Israeli	337	0.0	929	0.0
(Canada) Canadian	242	0.0	747	0.0
(Australia) Australian	142	0.0	226	0.0
Unknown	144	0.0	1,311	0.0
Unknown	144	0.0	1,311	0.0
Total	7,364,000		6,445,000	

Population by country of birth:

	2011	2013	2015	2019	2023	2024
(European Union) Bulgaria	7,290,666	7,188,273	7,077,389	6,951,482	6,277,700	6,232,331
Total foreign-born	78,621	96,113	123,803	168,516	168,595	211,839
Russia	18,725	19,533	24,416	31,679	28,498	32,951
Ukraine	5,877	6,084	7,039	10,115	13,638	23,519
Turkey	3,955	6,227	9,284	11,702	11,259	17,562
UK	3,042	5,066	6,738	9,992	11,307	12,409
Syria	1,250	1,298	8,318	14,080	7,546	12,249
(European Union) Greece	4,928	7,377	7,166	8,563	9,959	10,705
(European Union) Germany	2,083	3,638	5,533	9,334	13,533	9,334
(European Union) Spain	1,558	4,065	5,240	7,098	6,675	7,278
(European Union) Italy	1,082	2,261	2,830	3,790	5,518	6,350
North Macedonia	2,426	2,384	2,742	3,595	5,104	5,691
Moldova	1,893	1,996	2,363	2,990	3,905	4,530
(European Union) Romania	6,045	5,380	4,612	4,556	3,870	3,794
Serbia	2,306	2,246	2,318	2,879	3,075	3,613
(European Union) France	562	1,255	1,781	2,614	2,881	3,569
USA	1,180	2,023	2,431	3,153	2,905	3,279

Foreigners by nationality:

	2011	2015
Total	36,723	65,622
Russia	11,991	17,943
Turkey	2,741	8,157
Syria	729	7,508
Ukraine	3,064	3,874
UK	2,605	3,693
Unknown		2,538
(European Union) Greece	1,253	2,094
Stateless		1,875
North Macedonia	1,091	1,289
(European Union) Germany	848	1,266
Armenia	1,167	1,175
China	749	1,147
Moldova	893	1,018
(European Union) Poland	819	978
USA		876
(European Union) Italy	456	815
Serbia	569	813
Iraq	706	806
Kazakhstan		712

=== Net Migration ===
Bulgaria Net Migration, 2007–present
Year	Immigrants	Emigrants	Net Migration
2007	1,561	2,958	−1,397
2008	1,236	2,112	−876
2009	3,310	19,039	−15,729
2010	3,518	27,708	−24,190
2011	4,722	9,517	−4,795
2012	14,103	16,615	−2,512
2013	18,570	19,678	−1,108
2014	26,615	28,727	−2,112
2015	25,223	29,470	−4,247
2016	21,241	30,570	−9,329
2017	25,597	31,586	−5,999
2018	29,559	33,225	−3,666
2019	37,929	39,941	−2,012
2020	37,364	6,649	30,715
2021	39,461	26,755	12,706
2022	40,619	13,175	27,444
2023	56,807	15,227	41,580
2024	52,189	13,002	39,002
2025	44,640	9,555	35,085

== Age structure ==
0–14 years: ▼13.2%
15–65 years: ▲68.3%
65 years and over: ▲18.5% (Census 2011)

At the 2011 census, the largest cohort of those self-identified as Romani was the 0–9 years cohort, which accounted for 20.8% of all Romani. The same age cohort accounted for 10.2% of the Turks and 7.2% of the Bulgarians. At the 2021 census, the 0–9 years cohort amongst the Romani was second largest after the 10–19 years one and represented 17.0% of all Romani. The corresponding percentages for ethnic Bulgarians and ethnic Turks stood at 7.7% and 8.8%, respectively.

Ethnicity of children aged 0–9 (2011 census)
1. Bulgarians (62.0%)
2. Romani (10.2%)
3. Turks (9.00%)
4. Other (0.50%)
5. Undeclared (3.40%)
6. Data borrowed from adm. databases (14.9%)
Ethnicity of children aged 0–9 (2021 census)
1. Bulgarians (66.4%)
2. Romani (7.70%)
3. Turks (7.50%)
4. Other (0.70%)
5. Undeclared (2.00%)
6. Data borrowed from adm. databases (15.6%)

Ethnicity of children aged 0–9 per province (% from the declared)
Province	Ethnicity	Ethnicity	Ethnicity
	Bulgarian	Turkish	Roma
Bulgaria	72.9%	10.6%	12.0%
Blagoevgrad Province	80.9%	7.3%	7.8%
Burgas Province	68.5%	16.2%	9.7%
Dobrich Province	56.9%	17.1%	18.9%
Gabrovo Province	85.0%	8.2%	3.8%
Haskovo Province	62.7%	16.5%	16.7%
Kardzhali Province	23.8%	67.8%	2.7%
Kyustendil Province	79.4%	0.0%	16.1%
Lovech Province	78.0%	3.6%	14.8%
Montana Province	66.8%	0.1%	29.0%
Pazardzhik Province	67.3%	8.7%	16.7%
Pernik Province	90.3%	0.1%	7.5%
Pleven Province	78.5%	4.4%	13.5%
Plovdiv Province	74.1%	9.3%	11.9%
Razgrad Province	33.9%	50.0%	10.2%
Ruse Province	72.2%	15.1%	8.9%
Shumen Province	45.5%	31.5%	17.6%
Silistra Province	38.2%	43.1%	14.4%
Sliven Province	55.0%	11.6%	28.3%
Smolyan Province	87.6%	5.0%	1.9%
Sofia City	92.2%	0.5%	3.6%
Sofia Province	77.1%	0.2%	18.8%
Stara Zagora Province	68.3%	7.3%	19.9%
Targovishte Province	39.6%	38.0%	15.5%
Varna Province	79.2%	8.9%	7.0%
Veliko Tarnovo Province	79.9%	11.0%	4.4%
Vidin Province	74.3%	0.1%	20.6%
Vratsa Province	80.3%	0.4%	15.6%
Yambol Province	62.4%	5.8%	26.7%
Source (2011 census):

Bulgarian children constitute the majority of all children in 23 out of 28 provinces. They constitute more than ninety percent of all children in two provinces: Sofia (city) (92%) and Pernik Province (90%).

Turkish children constitute the majority in Kardzhali Province (68% of self-declared) and Razgrad Province (50% of self-declared); they also constitute the largest group of all children in Silistra Province (43%).

Roma children constitute 12% of all children in Bulgaria and more than a quarter in three provinces: Montana (29%), Sliven (28%) and Yambol (27%).

Bulgaria is ageing rapidly, especially in some remote rural areas.

Age Structure (2011)
Under working age (0–17)	Working age (18–64)	Above working age (65 and over)
1 172 208 (16.0%)	4 789 967 (65.1%)	1 389 059 (18.9%)
Age Structure (2017)
Under working age (0 – 17)	Working age (18 – 64)	Above working age (65 and over)
1 065 993 (15.1%)	4 248 503 (60.3%)	1 735 538 (24.6%)

The ageing of the population leads to an increase of the median age. The median age is 43.6 as of 2017, up from 40.4 years in 2001.

== Education ==
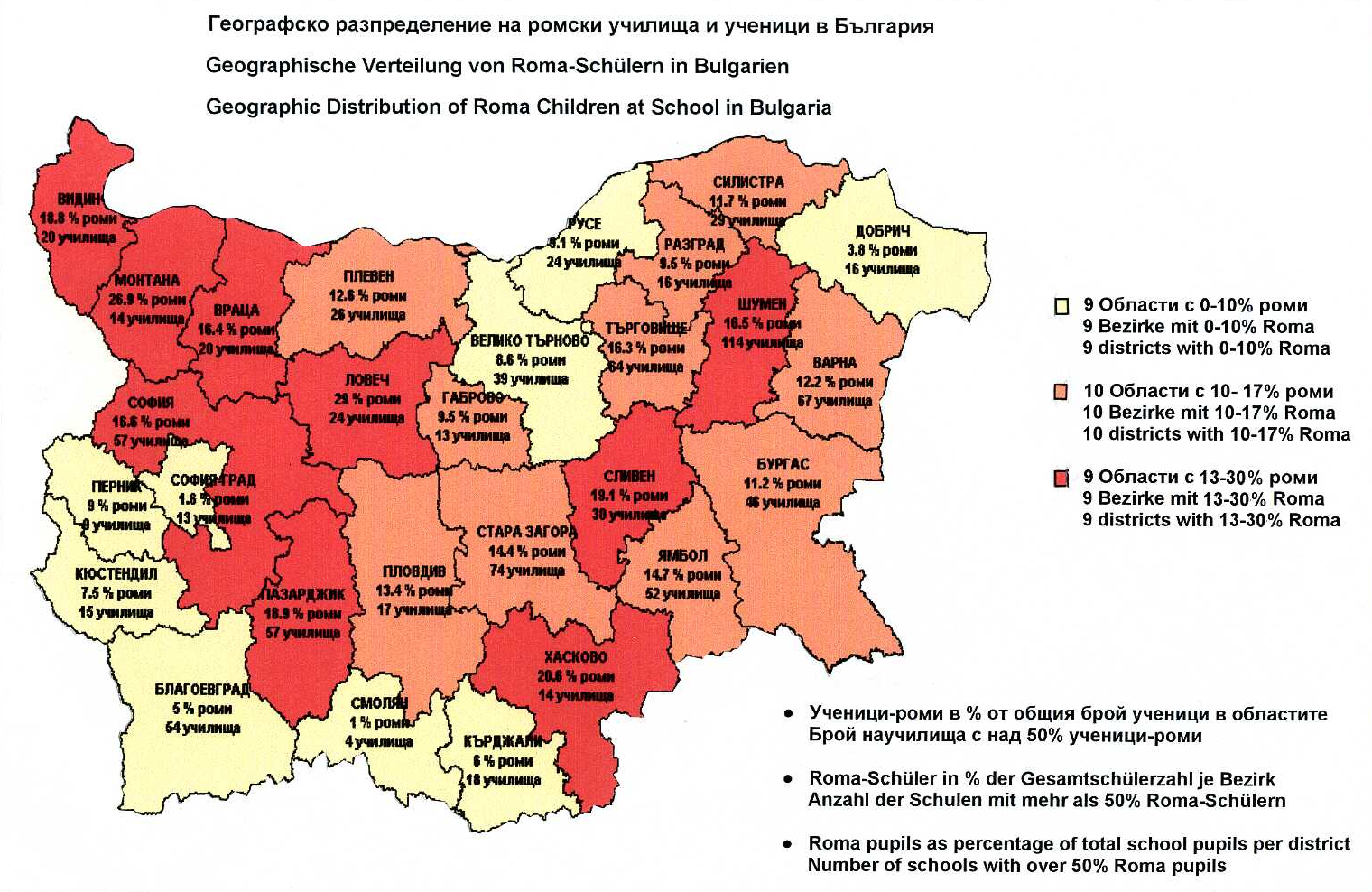
Map of Romani students in schools in Bulgaria

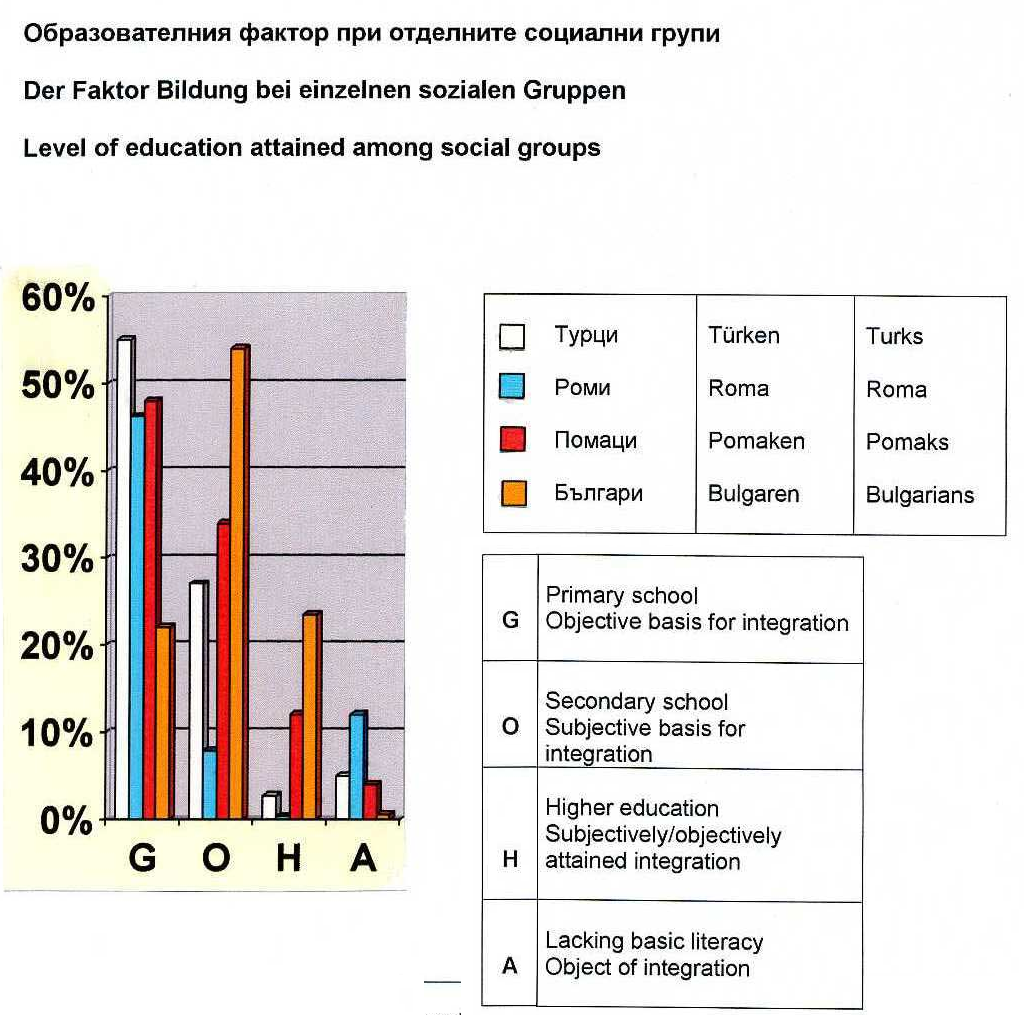
Chart of completed degrees by ethnic groups in Bulgaria

Over 98% of the population is literate, the males being more literate than the females.

According to the 2011 census, about 112,778 people aged nine or more are illiterate. There are considerable differences in the share of illiterate persons amongst the three main ethnic groups. Amongst the Bulgarian ethnic group the share of illiterate is 0.5%, amongst the Turkish – 4.7% and amongst the Roma ethnic group – 11.8%. About 81 thousand people aged seven or more never visited school.

== Unemployment ==
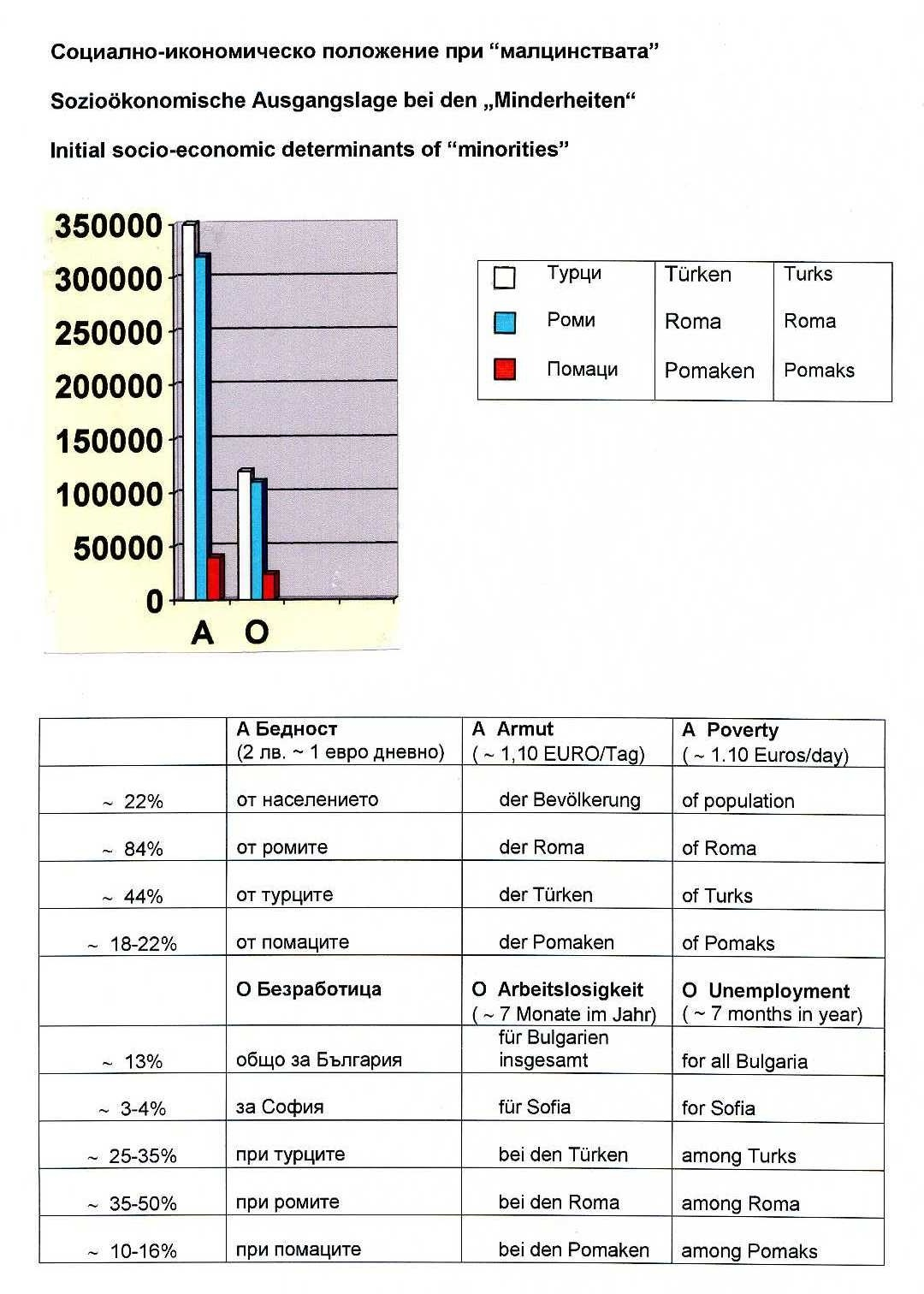
Chart of unemployment and poverty rate by ethnic groups

The number of unemployed people declined from 207,000 people (or around 6.2% of the population) in 2017 to 156,657 in November 2023. The unemployment rate stood at 4.3 per cent in November 2023 according to Eurostat.

Most unemployed people are aged 15 to 24 years old.

The unemployment rate in rural areas (around 10.0%) is nearly two times higher than the unemployment rate in urban areas (approximately 5.1%).

Vidin Province has the highest unemployment rate with almost one fifth of its labour force being unemployed. The provinces of Shumen (15.9%), Silistra (12.5%) and Targovishte (12.4%) also have very high unemployment rates.

== Other statistics ==
=== Home ownership ===
According to Eurostat, 82.3% per cent of the population live in privately owned and owner-occupied homes, ranking it as 12th highest in ownership globally. It is down from a recent peak of 87.6% in 2008, and has been steadily falling since.

=== Internet penetration ===
The number of Internet users has increased rapidly since 2000—from 430,000 their number grew to 1.55 million in 2004, and 3.4 million (48 per cent penetration rate) in 2010. Bulgaria has the third-fastest average Broadband Internet speed in the world after South Korea and Romania with an average speed of 1,611 kbit/s.

=== Mobile phone adoption ===
Currently there are three active mobile phone operators—A1, Yettel and Vivacom, A1 is the largest one with 5.2 million users as of 2010, Yettel has 3,9 million as of 2007 and Vivacom over 1 million.

=== HIV ===
Bulgaria's HIV rate is among the lowest in the world, being 0.1% or 3,800 infected as of 2009.

== Urbanization ==
Most Bulgarians (72.5 per cent) reside in urban areas. Approximately one-sixth of them live in Sofia, which has a population exceeding 1,200,000 people.

Urban population: ▲5,338,261 or 72.5% of total population (Census 2011)
Rural: 2,026,309 or 27.5%
Rate of urbanization: −0.3% annual rate of change (2005–10 est.)

== See also ==
- Immigration to Bulgaria
- Immigration to Europe
- List of countries by immigrant population
- Bulgaria
- Ageing of Europe
