= Potential support ratio =

Ratio of working-age to retirement-age people

The potential support ratio (PSR) is the number of people age 15–64 per one older person aged 65 or older. This ratio describes the burden placed on the working population (unemployment and children are not considered in this measure) by the non-working elderly population.

As a population ages, the potential support ratio tends to fall. Between 1950 and 2009, the potential ratio declined from 12 to 9 potential workers per person aged 65 or over. By 2050, the potential support ratio is projected to drop further to reach 4 potential worker per older person. The reduction of potential support ratio has important implications for social security schemes, particularly for pay-as-you-go pension systems under which taxes on current workers pay the pensions of retirees.

In 2015, Japan had the lowest PSR in the world, at 1.8.

== See also ==
- Dependency ratio
