= List of European regions by unemployment rate =

This is a list of European regions (NUTS2 regions) sorted by their unemployment rate (European definition). Eurostat calculates the unemployment rate based on the information provided by national statistics institutes affiliated to eurostat. The rate is the number of unemployed people aged 15–74 as a percentage of the labour force in that age group. The list presents statistics for the years 2006 to 2025 from EUROSTAT, as of October 2026.

Regional boundaries have changed during this period. Former regions and their successors are shown separately where their boundaries differ; unavailable observations are marked “n/a”. Eurostat's regional series for the United Kingdom end in 2019, and those for Montenegro end in 2020. A dagger (†) denotes a break in the time series, a double dagger (‡) denotes low reliability, and § denotes a difference in definition.

== 2016 to 2025 list ==
List of European regions and territories by unemployment rate in percent, 2016–2025
| Region (NUTS2) | Country | 2016 | 2017 | 2018 | 2019 | 2020 | 2021 | 2022 | 2023 | 2024 | 2025 |
|---|---|---|---|---|---|---|---|---|---|---|---|
| Brussels | Belgium | 16.8 | 14.9^{†} | 13.2 | 12.6 | 12.3 | 12.4^{†} | 11.4 | 10.6 | 11.8 | 12.6 |
| Antwerp | Belgium | 6.1 | 5.9^{†} | 4.4 | 3.6 | 4.0 | 5.2^{†} | 4.0 | 3.6 | 4.6 | 4.3 |
| Limburg | Belgium | 4.8 | 4.1^{†} | 3.8 | 3.6 | 3.6 | 3.4^{†} | 3.5 | 3.2 | 3.8 | 4.4 |
| East Flanders | Belgium | 4.2 | 3.4^{†} | 2.7 | 2.9 | 2.7 | 2.8^{†} | 2.0 | 2.9 | 3.4 | 4.2 |
| Flemish Brabant | Belgium | 4.8 | 4.7^{†} | 3.6 | 3.6 | 3.9 | 4.0^{†‡} | 3.6^{‡} | 4.2^{‡} | 4.2^{‡} | 5.5 |
| West Flanders | Belgium | 3.7 | 3.2^{†} | 2.6 | 2.5 | 3.3 | 3.6^{†} | 2.7 | 2.8 | 2.7 | 3.0 |
| Walloon Brabant | Belgium | 7.9 | 7.6^{†} | 6.9 | 5.5 | 6.2 | 6.8^{†} | 5.5 | 5.7 | 6.8 | 6.7 |
| Hainaut | Belgium | 11.8 | 11.4^{†} | 10.0 | 8.6 | 8.3 | 10.3^{†} | 10.5 | 9.3 | 8.7 | 9.0 |
| Liège | Belgium | 11.1 | 10.5^{†} | 8.2 | 6.7 | 7.8 | 9.4^{†} | 8.3 | 9.1 | 7.0 | 7.2 |
| Luxembourg | Belgium | 7.8 | 6.7^{†} | 5.4 | 5.4 | 5.1 | 5.6^{†} | 4.8 | 6.5 | 5.4 | 6.7 |
| Namur | Belgium | 9.7 | 7.4^{†} | 8.5 | 7.0 | 6.1 | 7.6^{†} | 7.2 | 6.6 | 6.8 | 7.7 |
| Severozapaden | Bulgaria | 10.6 | 11.3 | 11.3 | 10.6^{†} | 12.7 | 10.9^{†} | 6.8 | 7.8 | 9.7^{†} | 7.3 |
| Severen tsentralen | Bulgaria | 9.3 | 6.9 | 6.7 | 5.1^{†} | 5.7 | 6.7^{†} | 5.8 | 6.0 | 5.3^{†} | 4.0 |
| Severoiztochen | Bulgaria | 9.8 | 9.4 | 7.4 | 5.9^{†} | 6.0 | 5.9^{†} | 5.3 | 4.5 | 4.0^{†} | 3.9 |
| Yugoiztochen | Bulgaria | 7.9 | 7.0 | 5.4 | 3.9^{†} | 4.5 | 5.5^{†} | 4.4 | 4.6 | 4.9^{†} | 4.6 |
| Yugozapaden | Bulgaria | 5.4 | 3.3 | 2.6 | 2.2^{†} | 3.5 | 3.4^{†} | 3.1 | 3.5 | 2.8^{†} | 1.9 |
| Yuzhen tsentralen | Bulgaria | 7.1 | 5.3 | 4.2 | 3.0^{†} | 3.4 | 3.9^{†} | 2.9 | 3.1 | 2.9^{†} | 3.2 |
| Prague | Czech Republic | 2.2 | 1.7 | 1.3 | 1.3 | 2.3 | 2.3^{†} | 1.6 | 2.1 | 1.8 | 1.8 |
| Central Bohemia | Czech Republic | 3.1 | 2.1 | 2.0 | 1.3 | 1.9 | 2.5^{†} | 1.2 | 1.7 | 1.3 | 1.5 |
| Jihozápad | Czech Republic | 3.1 | 2.1 | 1.5 | 1.5 | 2.0 | 2.4^{†} | 1.7 | 1.9 | 2.3 | 2.2 |
| Severozápad | Czech Republic | 5.2 | 3.4 | 3.4 | 3.0 | 4.0 | 4.3^{†} | 3.3 | 4.1 | 4.1 | 4.8 |
| Severovýchod | Czech Republic | 4.0 | 2.8 | 2.0 | 1.7 | 2.3 | 2.4^{†} | 2.2 | 2.8 | 2.9 | 3.3 |
| Jihovýchod | Czech Republic | 3.7 | 3.1 | 2.3 | 1.9 | 2.3 | 2.4^{†} | 1.7 | 2.2 | 2.4 | 2.5 |
| Central Moravia | Czech Republic | 3.9 | 3.3 | 2.2 | 2.2 | 2.5 | 2.2^{†} | 2.8 | 2.5 | 2.6 | 2.7 |
| Moravian-Silesia | Czech Republic | 6.9 | 4.7 | 3.7 | 3.7 | 3.6 | 4.6^{†} | 4.0 | 3.9 | 4.1 | 4.3 |
| Capital Region of Denmark | Denmark | 6.2^{†} | 6.2^{†} | 5.4 | 5.1 | 6.1 | 5.7^{†} | 4.7 | 5.2^{†} | 6.6 | 6.8 |
| Central Denmark | Denmark | 5.4^{†} | 5.4^{†} | 4.7 | 4.9 | 5.5 | 4.8^{†} | 4.1 | 5.4^{†} | 6.1 | 6.5 |
| North Denmark | Denmark | 6.0^{†} | 5.6^{†} | 5.5 | 5.8 | 5.9 | 5.2^{†} | 4.8 | 4.7^{†} | 5.9 | 6.5 |
| Southern Denmark | Denmark | 6.1^{†} | 6.1^{†} | 4.9 | 4.8 | 5.1 | 4.5^{†} | 4.5 | 5.2^{†} | 6.0 | 6.1 |
| Zealand | Denmark | 6.2^{†} | 5.6^{†} | 5.2 | 4.9 | 5.4 | 5.0^{†} | 3.9 | 4.6^{†} | 5.8 | 5.4 |
| Stuttgart (district) | Germany | 3.3 | 3.0 | 2.3 | 2.4 | 3.5^{†} | 3.1^{†} | 2.8 | 2.9 | 3.2 | 3.6 |
| Karlsruhe (district) | Germany | 3.1 | 3.3 | 3.0 | 2.8 | 3.5^{†} | 3.4^{†} | 3.2 | 2.9 | 3.2 | 3.4 |
| Freiburg (district) | Germany | 3.0 | 2.9 | 2.6 | 2.2 | 2.7^{†‡} | 3.2^{†} | 2.3 | 2.2 | 2.5 | 3.1 |
| Tübingen (district) | Germany | 2.6 | 2.2 | 1.9 | 1.9 | 2.9^{†‡} | 3.0^{†} | 2.1^{‡} | 2.1^{‡} | 2.8 | 2.9 |
| Upper Bavaria | Germany | 2.4 | 2.2 | 2.3 | 1.9 | 2.8^{†} | 2.7^{†} | 2.2 | 2.3 | 2.7 | 3.0 |
| Lower Bavaria | Germany | 2.1 | 2.1 | 2.0 | 2.0 | —N/a | 1.8^{†‡} | —N/a | —N/a | 2.0^{‡} | 2.9^{‡} |
| Upper Palatinate | Germany | 2.9 | 2.2 | 1.9 | 2.3 | —N/a | 2.4^{†‡} | —N/a | 2.1^{‡} | 2.4^{‡} | 2.8^{‡} |
| Upper Franconia | Germany | 3.3 | 3.0 | 2.3 | 2.3 | —N/a | 3.3^{†‡} | 3.0^{‡} | 2.5^{‡} | 2.7^{‡} | 3.2^{‡} |
| Middle Franconia | Germany | 2.5 | 2.1 | 1.8 | 2.1 | 3.8^{†‡} | 3.4^{†} | 2.9 | 2.4^{‡} | 2.7 | 3.8 |
| Lower Franconia | Germany | 2.5 | 2.3 | 2.0 | 2.0 | —N/a | 2.6^{†‡} | 2.2^{‡} | 2.1^{‡} | 2.9^{‡} | 3.0^{‡} |
| Swabia | Germany | 2.7 | 2.6 | 2.4 | 2.2 | 2.5^{†‡} | 2.8^{†} | 2.3^{‡} | 1.8^{‡} | 2.6 | 2.7 |
| Berlin | Germany | 7.8 | 7.0 | 6.1 | 5.3 | 6.1^{†} | 5.7^{†} | 4.8 | 5.2 | 5.6 | 6.5 |
| Brandenburg | Germany | 4.6 | 4.5 | 4.1 | 3.4 | 4.2^{†} | 3.0^{†} | 3.3 | 3.3 | 3.2 | 3.8 |
| Bremen | Germany | 5.4 | 4.3 | 4.3 | 5.1 | —N/a | 6.5^{†‡} | 5.6^{‡} | 4.7^{‡} | 4.9^{‡} | 5.1^{‡} |
| Hamburg | Germany | 4.1 | 4.2 | 4.1 | 3.6 | 4.8^{†} | 4.5^{†} | 4.0 | 4.1 | 4.8 | 5.3 |
| Darmstadt (district) | Germany | 4.0 | 3.5 | 3.1 | 3.1 | 4.2^{†} | 4.1^{†} | 3.9 | 3.1 | 3.4 | 3.6 |
| Gießen (district) | Germany | 4.0 | 3.6 | 3.6 | 3.3 | 5.2^{†‡} | 3.5^{†‡} | 2.6^{‡} | 3.0^{‡} | 3.7^{‡} | 2.7^{‡} |
| Kassel (district) | Germany | 3.7 | 2.5 | 2.9 | 2.8 | —N/a | 3.0^{†‡} | 2.4^{‡} | 2.1^{‡} | 2.2^{‡} | 3.6^{‡} |
| Mecklenburg-Vorpommern | Germany | 6.3 | 5.2 | 4.9 | 4.0 | 4.5^{†‡} | 3.8^{†} | 3.8 | 4.3 | 3.7 | 3.5 |
| Braunschweig (district) | Germany | 4.6 | 4.4 | 4.0 | 3.3 | 4.5^{†‡} | 3.9^{†} | 3.1 | 3.1^{‡} | 3.7 | 3.9 |
| Hanover (district) | Germany | 4.7 | 4.5 | 4.1 | 3.5 | 3.7^{†} | 2.8^{†} | 3.1 | 3.0 | 3.1 | 3.9 |
| Lüneburg (district) | Germany | 3.3 | 3.4 | 2.5 | 2.6 | 3.8^{†‡} | 3.1^{†} | 2.6^{‡} | 2.6^{‡} | 2.7^{‡} | 3.3 |
| Weser-Ems (district) | Germany | 3.6 | 3.0 | 2.7 | 3.0 | 3.3^{†} | 3.6^{†} | 2.7 | 2.5 | 3.1 | 2.9 |
| Düsseldorf (district) | Germany | 4.9 | 4.3 | 4.3 | 3.8 | 5.1^{†} | 4.4^{†} | 3.9 | 4.0 | 4.3 | 4.8 |
| Cologne (district) | Germany | 3.9 | 3.7 | 3.7 | 3.4 | 4.1^{†} | 4.1^{†} | 3.2 | 3.3 | 3.7 | 3.9 |
| Münster (district) | Germany | 4.3 | 3.9 | 3.6 | 3.4 | 3.6^{†} | 3.7^{†} | 3.4 | 3.0 | 3.4 | 3.4 |
| Detmold (district) | Germany | 4.1 | 3.9 | 3.3 | 3.0 | 3.7^{†‡} | 3.9^{†} | 2.7 | 2.4 | 3.4 | 3.7 |
| Arnsberg (district) | Germany | 5.0 | 4.7 | 4.0 | 3.9 | 5.1^{†} | 4.2^{†} | 3.9 | 3.6 | 4.1 | 4.7 |
| Koblenz (district) | Germany | 3.4 | 3.1 | 2.8 | 2.3 | —N/a | 2.8^{†‡} | 2.8^{‡} | 2.5^{‡} | 3.3 | 2.9^{‡} |
| Trier (district) | Germany | 2.7 | 2.0 | 2.6 | 2.0 | —N/a | —N/a | —N/a | —N/a | —N/a | —N/a |
| Rheinhessen-Pfalz (district) | Germany | 4.1 | 3.8 | 3.5 | 3.3 | 4.0^{†} | 4.2^{†} | 3.6 | 3.6 | 3.4 | 4.0 |
| Saarland | Germany | 4.9 | 4.5 | 3.6 | 3.7 | —N/a | 3.2^{†‡} | 3.7^{‡} | 3.4^{‡} | 3.6^{‡} | 4.1^{‡} |
| Dresden (district) | Germany | 4.9 | 4.3 | 4.1 | 3.5 | 3.6^{†‡} | 3.4^{†} | 3.4 | 2.4^{‡} | 3.6 | 4.7 |
| Chemnitz (district) | Germany | 4.4 | 4.1 | 3.4 | 3.7 | —N/a | 2.3^{†‡} | 2.3^{‡} | 3.3^{‡} | 3.1^{‡} | 4.4 |
| Leipzig (district) | Germany | 6.0 | 5.1 | 4.8 | 4.7 | 5.3^{†‡} | 4.5^{†‡} | 3.5^{‡} | 4.5 | 5.5 | 5.2 |
| Saxony-Anhalt | Germany | 7.4 | 6.9 | 5.3 | 4.6 | 4.8^{†} | 4.2^{†} | 3.9 | 3.8 | 4.2 | 4.9 |
| Schleswig-Holstein | Germany | 4.0 | 3.6 | 3.1 | 2.9 | 3.5^{†} | 3.2^{†} | 2.9 | 3.1 | 3.4 | 3.7 |
| Thuringia | Germany | 5.1 | 4.4 | 4.1 | 3.7 | 4.2^{†} | 3.5^{†} | 3.0 | 3.1 | 3.5 | 3.7 |
| Estonia | Estonia | 6.9 | 5.8 | 5.4 | 4.5 | 7.0 | 6.2^{†} | 5.6 | 6.4 | 7.6 | 7.5 |
| Northern and Western | Ireland | 8.6 | 6.2^{†} | 5.6 | 4.8 | 5.0 | 5.0^{†} | 4.0 | 3.8 | 4.2 | 4.8 |
| Southern | Ireland | 8.6 | 7.0^{†} | 6.2 | 5.5 | 5.8 | 6.5^{†} | 4.3 | 4.2 | 4.1 | 4.2 |
| Eastern and Midland | Ireland | 8.2 | 6.7^{†} | 5.6 | 4.7 | 5.8 | 6.5^{†} | 4.7 | 4.5 | 4.4 | 4.9 |
| Eastern Macedonia and Thrace | Greece | 22.8 | 19.5 | 16.0 | 16.2 | 17.2 | 18.5^{†} | 14.7 | 12.1 | 11.6 | 10.6 |
| Central Macedonia | Greece | 24.5 | 22.9 | 20.7 | 19.6 | 18.4 | 16.1^{†} | 14.7 | 14.1 | 12.8 | 11.7 |
| Western Macedonia | Greece | 31.3 | 29.1 | 27.0 | 24.6 | 19.7 | 19.8^{†} | 17.7 | 16.7 | 12.5 | 15.3 |
| Epirus | Greece | 24.4 | 24.8 | 20.1 | 16.4 | 17.9 | 15.1^{†} | 13.3 | 13.8 | 10.7 | 9.9 |
| Thessaly | Greece | 25.5 | 20.7 | 18.4 | 18.7 | 16.9 | 16.7^{†} | 16.4 | 12.9 | 10.0 | 6.3 |
| Ionian Islands | Greece | 16.0 | 19.7 | 16.0 | 12.4 | 16.0 | 13.2^{†} | 12.9 | 14.7 | 16.2 | 9.0 |
| Western Greece | Greece | 29.8 | 26.3 | 24.1 | 24.1 | 21.6 | 17.5^{†} | 12.6 | 9.8 | 10.1 | 9.7 |
| Central Greece | Greece | 25.0 | 20.9 | 18.9 | 17.2 | 19.3 | 17.2^{†} | 13.8 | 9.9 | 8.6 | 8.5 |
| Peloponnese | Greece | 19.2 | 16.8 | 14.4 | 12.0 | 11.4 | 12.7^{†} | 12.6 | 9.6 | 7.6 | 8.3 |
| Attica | Greece | 23.0 | 21.6 | 19.9 | 16.9 | 14.1 | 11.9^{†} | 10.0 | 9.4 | 9.1 | 8.1 |
| North Aegean | Greece | 18.3 | 22.5 | 22.3 | 17.7 | 16.5 | 13.9^{†} | 11.5 | 10.0 | 7.1 | 6.4 |
| South Aegean | Greece | 17.5 | 16.0 | 16.9 | 13.7 | 16.7 | 18.8^{†} | 10.7 | 7.1 | 9.9 | 7.3 |
| Crete | Greece | 22.6 | 17.7 | 13.4 | 11.7 | 17.3 | 16.3^{†} | 12.1 | 10.8 | 8.6 | 5.1 |
| Galicia | Spain | 17.2 | 15.7 | 13.3 | 11.8 | 12.0 | 11.6^{†§} | 11.0^{§} | 9.7^{§} | 9.4^{§} | 8.4^{§} |
| Asturias | Spain | 17.6 | 13.7 | 13.6 | 14.2 | 14.1 | 12.3^{†§} | 12.5^{§} | 12.1^{§} | 10.1^{§} | 8.8^{§} |
| Cantabria | Spain | 14.9 | 13.6 | 10.7 | 10.3 | 12.2 | 11.3^{†§} | 9.6^{§} | 8.1^{§} | 7.8^{§} | 7.3^{§} |
| Basque Country | Spain | 12.6 | 11.3 | 10.0 | 9.2 | 9.5 | 10.3^{†§} | 8.9^{§} | 7.7^{§} | 8.1^{§} | 7.3^{§} |
| Navarre | Spain | 12.5 | 10.2 | 10.0 | 8.2 | 10.1 | 10.7^{†§} | 9.7^{§} | 9.9^{§} | 7.6^{§} | 7.7^{§} |
| La Rioja | Spain | 13.5 | 12.0 | 10.4 | 10.0 | 10.8 | 11.6^{†§} | 9.6^{§} | 9.4^{§} | 9.7^{§} | 8.1^{§} |
| Aragon | Spain | 14.8 | 11.7 | 10.6 | 10.0 | 11.7 | 10.3^{†§} | 9.6^{§} | 8.6^{§} | 8.1^{§} | 8.0^{§} |
| Community of Madrid | Spain | 15.7 | 13.4 | 12.2 | 10.6 | 12.5 | 11.7^{†§} | 11.2^{§} | 10.0^{§} | 9.0^{§} | 8.0^{§} |
| Castile and León | Spain | 15.8 | 14.1 | 12.1 | 11.6 | 12.1 | 11.6^{†§} | 9.9^{§} | 9.7^{§} | 9.4^{§} | 8.6^{§} |
| Castilla–La Mancha | Spain | 23.6 | 20.8 | 18.2 | 16.2 | 17.7 | 15.7^{†§} | 14.6^{§} | 13.2^{§} | 13.3^{§} | 12.8^{§} |
| Extremadura | Spain | 27.5 | 26.3 | 23.7 | 21.6 | 21.8 | 20.2^{†§} | 17.3^{§} | 17.4^{§} | 15.5^{§} | 14.8^{§} |
| Catalonia | Spain | 15.7 | 13.4 | 11.5 | 11.0 | 12.6 | 11.7^{†§} | 10.0^{§} | 9.3^{§} | 8.9^{§} | 8.4^{§} |
| Valencia | Spain | 20.6 | 18.2 | 15.6 | 14.1 | 16.2 | 16.1^{†§} | 13.3^{§} | 12.8^{§} | 12.6^{§} | 11.6^{§} |
| Balearic Islands | Spain | 13.9 | 12.4 | 11.5 | 11.8 | 16.1 | 14.3^{†§} | 10.6^{§} | 10.3^{§} | 9.3^{§} | 8.8^{§} |
| Andalusia | Spain | 28.9 | 25.5 | 23.0 | 21.2 | 22.3 | 21.9^{†§} | 19.1^{§} | 18.3^{§} | 16.5^{§} | 15.2^{§} |
| Murcia | Spain | 19.8 | 18.0 | 16.8 | 14.7 | 16.2 | 14.7^{†§} | 13.6^{§} | 12.8^{§} | 12.7^{§} | 12.1^{§} |
| Ceuta | Spain | 24.9 | 22.4 | 29.0 | 25.8 | 24.5 | 30.8^{†§} | 30.0^{§} | 30.0^{§} | 27.5^{§} | 24.3^{§} |
| Melilla | Spain | 30.8 | 27.6 | 25.8 | 27.0 | 23.7 | 25.4^{†§} | 25.9^{§} | 26.6^{§} | 28.3^{§} | 24.9^{§} |
| Canary Islands | Spain | 26.1 | 23.5 | 20.1 | 20.5 | 22.6 | 23.5^{†§} | 17.6^{§} | 16.1^{§} | 13.8^{§} | 13.5^{§} |
| Île-de-France (Paris Metro) | France | 9.2 | 8.7 | 8.8 | 7.9 | 8.2 | 8.0^{†§} | 7.6^{§} | 7.6^{§} | 8.0^{†§} | 8.8^{§} |
| Centre-Val de Loire | France | 9.9 | 8.5 | 8.4 | 8.2 | 8.9 | 7.2^{†§} | 6.4^{§} | 5.7^{§} | 5.6^{†§} | 6.1^{§} |
| Champagne-Ardenne | France | 11.3 | 9.6 | 8.8 | 9.1 | 11.7 | 8.9^{†§} | 8.0^{§} | 7.1^{§} | 7.2^{†§} | 7.0^{§} |
| Picardy | France | 11.5 | 10.0 | 9.2 | 9.1 | 8.6 | 9.7^{†§} | 9.1^{§} | 9.1^{§} | 7.6^{†§} | 7.5^{§} |
| Upper Normandy | France | 11.5 | 11.3 | 9.3 | 9.9 | 8.3 | 7.6^{†§} | 7.9^{§} | 6.9^{§} | 7.6^{†§} | 8.0^{§} |
| Lower Normandy | France | 8.6 | 8.1 | 8.0 | 8.2 | 6.1 | 6.4^{†§} | 6.2^{§} | 6.0^{§} | 7.3^{†§} | 6.6^{§} |
| Burgundy | France | 9.6 | 10.7 | 8.9 | 7.5 | 7.8 | 7.1^{†§} | 6.7^{§} | 7.3^{§} | 6.7^{†§} | 7.0^{§} |
| Nord-Pas-de-Calais | France | 13.3 | 12.9 | 12.2 | 11.2 | 9.1 | 8.8^{†§} | 8.7^{§} | 9.8^{§} | 9.5^{†§} | 9.0^{§} |
| Lorraine | France | 11.7 | 11.0 | 9.8 | 8.1 | 8.7 | 8.5^{†§} | 6.9^{§} | 7.4^{§} | 8.5^{†§} | 7.8^{§} |
| Alsace | France | 10.9 | 9.0 | 8.0 | 7.3 | 7.3 | 7.1^{†§} | 6.7^{§} | 5.9^{§} | 6.0^{†§} | 5.1^{§} |
| Franche-Comté | France | 8.1 | 6.9 | 7.2 | 8.2 | 5.6 | 7.0^{†§} | 5.9^{§} | 5.7^{§} | 5.3^{†§} | 8.2^{§} |
| Pays de la Loire | France | 8.9 | 7.1 | 7.8 | 7.6 | 6.9 | 6.0^{†§} | 6.1^{§} | 6.1^{§} | 6.3^{†§} | 6.6^{§} |
| Brittany | France | 8.6 | 7.3 | 6.8 | 6.9 | 6.7 | 5.8^{†§} | 5.9^{§} | 5.4^{§} | 5.7^{†§} | 5.6^{§} |
| Poitou-Charentes | France | 9.0 | 9.1 | 8.7 | 8.1 | 8.6 | 8.6^{†§} | 7.2^{§} | 7.3^{§} | 5.3^{†§} | 6.4^{§} |
| Aquitaine | France | 10.0 | 10.1 | 9.3 | 9.1 | 7.3 | 7.4^{†§} | 6.9^{§} | 7.2^{§} | 6.9^{†§} | 7.7^{§} |
| Midi-Pyrénées | France | 8.5 | 7.2 | 7.7 | 6.7 | 5.6 | 6.1^{†§} | 6.2^{§} | 6.1^{§} | 6.2^{†§} | 6.5^{§} |
| Limousin | France | 7.1 | 6.3 | 7.0 | 7.0 | 7.2 | 6.3^{†§} | 6.8^{§} | 6.3^{§} | 5.4^{†§} | 6.2^{§} |
| Rhône-Alpes | France | 8.1 | 7.3 | 7.3 | 7.0 | 7.5 | 7.2^{†§} | 6.6^{§} | 6.5^{§} | 6.8^{†§} | 7.1^{§} |
| Auvergne | France | 7.2 | 8.4 | 7.8 | 5.6 | 5.5 | 7.0^{†§} | 7.1^{§} | 7.1^{§} | 7.8^{†§} | 6.4^{§} |
| Languedoc-Roussillon | France | 11.9 | 12.3 | 11.7 | 10.4 | 9.2 | 11.4^{†§} | 9.0^{§} | 9.2^{§} | 9.0^{†§} | 8.9^{§} |
| Provence-Alpes-Côte d'Azur | France | 10.6 | 10.3 | 9.3 | 8.8 | 8.0 | 8.1^{†§} | 6.7^{§} | 7.1^{§} | 6.9^{†§} | 7.3^{§} |
| Corsica | France | 8.3^{‡} | 9.8^{‡} | 5.0^{‡} | 6.3^{‡} | 8.1^{‡} | 9.1^{†‡§} | 6.1^{‡§} | 6.9^{‡§} | 7.2^{†‡§} | 7.3^{‡§} |
| Guadeloupe | France | 23.8 | 22.4 | 22.6 | 20.6 | 17.5 | 17.1^{†§} | 18.6^{§} | 18.6^{§} | 16.8^{†§} | 16.6^{§} |
| Martinique | France | 17.8 | 17.8 | 17.3 | 14.8 | 12.4 | 12.8^{†§} | 12.5^{§} | 10.8^{§} | 12.3^{†§} | 13.4^{§} |
| French Guiana | France | 23.0 | 21.9 | 19.0 | 19.3 | 16.1 | 14.6^{†§} | 13.1^{§} | 14.0^{§} | 17.0^{†§} | 16.9^{§} |
| Réunion | France | 22.3 | 22.7 | 24.0 | 21.3 | 17.4 | 17.9^{†§} | 18.1^{§} | 19.0^{§} | 17.3^{†§} | 16.3^{§} |
| Mayotte | France | 29.7 | 29.6 | 35.1 | 30.1 | 27.8^{‡} | —N/a | —N/a | —N/a | 26.9^{†§} | 24.9^{§} |
| Adriatic Croatia | Croatia | 13.9 | 10.8 | 9.2 | 6.4 | 7.4 | 9.2^{†} | 6.8 | 6.0 | 6.4 | 5.5 |
| Pannonian Croatia | Croatia | 17.1 | 16.0 | 12.1 | 9.5 | 11.9 | 9.5^{†} | 10.6 | 10.1 | 7.1 | 7.4 |
| City of Zagreb | Croatia | 9.5 | 8.2 | 5.1 | 5.4 | 4.7 | 5.3^{†} | 5.3 | 3.8 | 2.6 | 3.0 |
| Northern Croatia | Croatia | 10.0 | 8.7 | 5.8 | 4.6 | 5.0 | 4.6^{†} | 4.0 | 4.4 | 3.1 | 3.0 |
| Piedmont | Italy | 9.4 | 9.1 | 8.2^{†} | 7.6 | 7.5 | 7.3^{†} | 6.5 | 6.2 | 5.4 | 6.0 |
| Aosta Valley | Italy | 8.7 | 7.8 | 7.1^{†} | 6.5 | 5.8 | 7.3^{†} | 5.4^{‡} | 4.0^{‡} | 3.9^{‡} | 3.9^{‡} |
| Liguria | Italy | 9.8 | 9.5 | 9.8^{†} | 9.5 | 8.2 | 8.4^{†} | 7.0 | 6.1 | 5.4 | 4.7 |
| Lombardy | Italy | 7.4 | 6.4 | 6.0^{†} | 5.6 | 5.1 | 5.9^{†} | 4.9 | 4.0 | 3.7 | 3.0 |
| South Tyrol | Italy | 3.7 | 3.1 | 2.9^{†} | 2.9 | 3.7 | 3.8^{†} | 2.3 | 2.0 | 2.0 | 1.8 |
| Trentino | Italy | 6.9 | 5.7 | 4.8^{†} | 5.0 | 5.4 | 4.8^{†} | 3.8 | 3.8 | 2.7 | 2.2 |
| Veneto | Italy | 6.8 | 6.3 | 6.4^{†} | 5.6 | 5.8 | 5.3^{†} | 4.2 | 4.2 | 3.0 | 3.4 |
| Friuli-Venezia Giulia | Italy | 7.6 | 6.7 | 6.7^{†} | 6.1 | 5.6 | 5.7^{†} | 5.3 | 4.6 | 4.3 | 4.6 |
| Emilia-Romagna | Italy | 7.0 | 6.6 | 5.8^{†} | 5.5 | 5.8 | 5.5^{†} | 5.0 | 5.0 | 4.3 | 4.1 |
| Tuscany | Italy | 9.5 | 8.6 | 7.3^{†} | 6.7 | 6.7 | 7.5^{†} | 6.0 | 5.3 | 4.0 | 4.3 |
| Umbria | Italy | 9.6 | 10.6 | 9.2^{†} | 8.4 | 8.2 | 6.6^{†} | 7.1 | 6.0 | 4.8 | 4.6 |
| Marche | Italy | 10.6 | 10.6 | 8.1^{†} | 8.6 | 7.4 | 7.1^{†} | 6.2 | 5.2 | 5.1 | 5.1 |
| Lazio | Italy | 11.2 | 10.7 | 11.1^{†} | 9.9 | 9.2 | 10.0^{†} | 7.7 | 7.2 | 6.3 | 5.5 |
| Abruzzo | Italy | 12.1 | 11.7 | 10.8^{†} | 11.1 | 9.6 | 9.3^{†} | 9.4 | 8.1 | 7.1 | 6.5 |
| Molise | Italy | 12.8 | 14.6 | 12.7^{†} | 12.0 | 9.8 | 10.9^{†} | 10.5 | 9.6 | 7.9 | 6.2 |
| Campania | Italy | 20.4 | 20.9 | 20.3^{†} | 20.0 | 18.2 | 19.3^{†} | 17.1 | 17.4 | 15.6 | 13.9 |
| Apulia | Italy | 19.4 | 18.9 | 16.1^{†} | 14.8 | 14.1 | 14.6^{†} | 12.1 | 11.6 | 9.3 | 10.0 |
| Basilicata | Italy | 13.3 | 12.8 | 12.5^{†} | 10.8 | 8.7 | 8.3^{†} | 7.1 | 7.5 | 6.7 | 5.3 |
| Calabria | Italy | 23.2 | 21.6 | 21.6^{†} | 20.9 | 19.9 | 18.0^{†} | 14.6 | 15.9 | 13.1 | 9.8 |
| Sicily | Italy | 22.1 | 21.5 | 21.3^{†} | 19.9 | 18.1 | 18.7^{†} | 16.6 | 15.8 | 13.0 | 12.2 |
| Sardinia | Italy | 17.3 | 17.0 | 15.4^{†} | 14.8 | 13.0 | 13.5^{†} | 11.5 | 10.1 | 8.3 | 9.3 |
| Cyprus | Cyprus | 13.0 | 11.1 | 8.4 | 7.2 | 7.6 | 7.2^{†} | 6.3 | 5.8 | 4.8 | 4.4 |
| Latvia | Latvia | 9.6 | 8.7 | 7.4 | 6.3 | 8.1 | 7.6^{†} | 6.9 | 6.5 | 6.9 | 6.9 |
| Middle and Western Lithuania | Lithuania | 8.9 | 8.1 | 6.9 | 7.2 | 9.3 | 8.2^{†} | 6.6 | 7.8 | 7.7 | 7.8 |
| Capital Region | Lithuania | 5.6 | 4.8 | 4.6 | 4.4 | 6.8 | 4.8^{†} | 4.6 | 4.9 | 5.9 | 5.1 |
| Luxembourg | Luxembourg | 6.3 | 5.5 | 5.6 | 5.6 | 6.8 | 5.3^{†} | 4.6 | 5.2 | 6.4 | 6.5 |
| Budapest | Hungary | 4.3 | 2.9 | 3.0^{†} | 2.4 | 3.3 | 2.9^{†} | 2.3 | 2.3 | 2.6 | 3.2 |
| Pest County | Hungary | 3.1 | 2.6 | 2.2^{†} | 2.4 | 3.3 | 2.9^{†} | 2.2 | 3.2 | 3.1 | 3.0 |
| Central Transdanubia | Hungary | 3.0 | 2.2 | 2.2^{†} | 2.0 | 2.8 | 2.1^{†} | 1.7 | 2.2 | 2.8 | 3.1 |
| Western Transdanubia | Hungary | 2.7 | 2.4 | 2.0^{†} | 1.7 | 2.4 | 2.3^{†} | 2.4 | 2.7 | 3.3 | 3.1 |
| Southern Transdanubia | Hungary | 6.2 | 6.3 | 5.4^{†} | 4.8 | 5.3 | 4.7^{†} | 4.6 | 6.0 | 7.3 | 6.4 |
| Northern Hungary | Hungary | 6.3 | 5.8 | 4.8^{†} | 4.4 | 5.1 | 6.2^{†} | 6.2 | 6.4 | 6.9 | 7.0 |
| Northern Great Plain | Hungary | 9.3 | 7.4 | 6.6^{†} | 6.3 | 7.3 | 7.0^{†} | 6.2 | 6.7 | 7.1 | 6.1 |
| Southern Great Plain | Hungary | 5.6 | 4.1 | 3.4^{†} | 3.4 | 4.6 | 4.4^{†} | 4.0 | 4.6 | 4.8 | 4.8 |
| Malta | Malta | 4.7 | 4.0 | 4.0 | 4.1 | 4.9 | 3.8^{†} | 3.5 | 3.5 | 3.2 | 3.1 |
| Groningen | Netherlands | 8.2 | 7.2 | 5.5 | 5.1 | 5.2 | 5.4^{†} | 4.7 | 4.2 | 4.7 | 4.5 |
| Friesland | Netherlands | 6.7 | 5.6 | 4.7 | 3.7 | 3.9 | 4.5^{†} | 3.8 | 4.0 | 3.9 | 4.0 |
| Drenthe | Netherlands | 6.5 | 5.0 | 4.2 | 2.8 | 3.7 | 3.5^{†} | 2.9 | 3.3 | 3.4 | 3.6 |
| Overijssel | Netherlands | 6.2 | 5.1 | 3.7 | 3.0 | 3.5 | 3.8^{†} | 3.3 | 2.9 | 3.4 | 3.7 |
| Gelderland | Netherlands | 5.6 | 4.5 | 3.3 | 3.1 | 3.5 | 3.9^{†} | 3.5 | 3.3 | 3.5 | 3.4 |
| Flevoland | Netherlands | 8.0 | 5.7 | 4.5 | 3.5 | 3.9 | 4.6^{†} | 3.3 | 4.3 | 3.8 | 3.7 |
| Utrecht (NUTS 2021) | Netherlands | 5.0 | 4.2 | 3.4 | —N/a | —N/a | —N/a | —N/a | —N/a | —N/a | —N/a |
| North Holland | Netherlands | 5.5 | 4.5 | 3.8 | 3.2 | 3.9 | 4.5^{†} | 3.6 | 3.8 | 3.8 | 3.8 |
| South Holland (NUTS 2021) | Netherlands | 7.1 | 5.6 | 4.3 | —N/a | —N/a | —N/a | —N/a | —N/a | —N/a | —N/a |
| Zeeland | Netherlands | 3.9 | 2.9 | 2.7 | 2.6 | 2.6 | 3.6^{†} | 2.6 | 2.1 | 2.1 | 2.2 |
| North Brabant | Netherlands | 5.3 | 4.2 | 3.5 | 3.2 | 3.5 | 3.2^{†} | 3.0 | 3.2 | 3.2 | 3.5 |
| Limburg | Netherlands | 5.7 | 4.8 | 3.4 | 3.1 | 3.5 | 3.8^{†} | 3.6 | 3.4 | 3.3 | 3.0 |
| Utrecht | Netherlands | —N/a | —N/a | —N/a | 2.9 | 3.5 | 4.0^{†} | 3.3 | 3.3 | 3.7 | 3.8 |
| South Holland | Netherlands | —N/a | —N/a | —N/a | 4.1 | 4.4 | 5.1^{†} | 4.0 | 4.0 | 4.1 | 4.8 |
| Burgenland | Austria | 5.7 | 5.2 | 4.2^{‡} | 3.6^{‡} | 4.2 | 5.1^{†} | 4.3 | 5.2 | 4.9 | 5.0 |
| Lower Austria | Austria | 5.2 | 4.8 | 3.8 | 4.0 | 4.2 | 5.1^{†} | 4.0 | 4.3 | 4.2 | 4.4 |
| Vienna | Austria | 11.3 | 10.4 | 10.0 | 9.3 | 10.7 | 12.1^{†} | 9.2 | 9.6 | 9.4 | 9.9 |
| Carinthia | Austria | 5.4 | 4.8 | 4.1 | 3.8 | 4.7 | 5.6^{†} | 4.5 | 4.5 | 4.3 | 4.8 |
| Styria | Austria | 5.1 | 4.5 | 4.0 | 3.2 | 4.4 | 4.3^{†} | 3.7 | 4.3 | 4.4 | 5.0 |
| Upper Austria | Austria | 4.5 | 4.0 | 3.2 | 2.9 | 3.9 | 3.8^{†} | 2.9 | 3.5 | 3.8 | 4.6 |
| Salzburg | Austria | 3.4 | 3.1 | 2.8 | 2.4 | 3.0 | 4.6^{†} | 3.0 | 3.0 | 3.4 | 3.5 |
| Tyrol | Austria | 3.5 | 3.3 | 2.4 | 2.1 | 3.1 | 4.8^{†} | 3.2 | 3.1 | 3.1 | 3.8 |
| Vorarlberg | Austria | 3.4 | 3.7 | 3.3 | 3.2 | 3.6 | 4.1^{†} | 3.2 | 3.4 | 4.1 | 4.3 |
| Lesser Poland | Poland | 5.2^{†} | 4.2 | 2.9 | 2.9^{†} | 2.7 | 3.2^{†} | 2.4 | 2.3 | 2.5 | 2.8 |
| Silesia | Poland | 5.4^{†} | 3.9 | 3.4 | 2.4^{†} | 2.7 | 2.9^{†} | 2.2 | 2.5 | 2.4 | 2.6 |
| Greater Poland | Poland | 4.8^{†} | 3.1 | 2.2 | 2.6^{†} | 1.8 | 2.3^{†} | 2.0 | 2.8 | 2.3 | 2.8 |
| West Pomerania | Poland | 7.0^{†} | 4.7 | 3.8 | 3.1^{†} | 3.4 | 3.5^{†} | 2.3^{‡} | 2.2^{‡} | 2.7 | 2.9 |
| Lubusz | Poland | 4.7^{†} | 3.7 | 3.0^{‡} | 2.0^{†‡} | —N/a | —N/a | —N/a | —N/a | —N/a | —N/a |
| Lower Silesia | Poland | 5.5^{†} | 4.7 | 3.3 | 3.3^{†} | 3.2 | 4.1^{†} | 3.5 | 3.0 | 3.4 | 3.4 |
| Opole | Poland | 5.0^{†} | 4.3 | 3.2^{‡} | 3.2^{†‡} | 2.8^{‡} | 2.8^{†‡} | 2.7^{‡} | 2.7^{‡} | 2.4^{‡} | 3.5^{‡} |
| Kuyavian-Pomerania | Poland | 7.4^{†} | 5.5 | 4.3 | 3.9^{†} | 3.1 | 4.5^{†} | 3.9 | 3.8 | 4.2 | 4.1 |
| Warmian-Masuria | Poland | 8.8^{†} | 7.2 | 5.6 | 3.3^{†} | 3.0^{‡} | 3.5^{†} | 3.4 | 2.6^{‡} | 3.8 | 3.3 |
| Pomerania | Poland | 5.7^{†} | 4.2 | 3.0 | 2.8^{†} | 3.2 | 2.4^{†} | 1.9 | 1.9 | 2.2 | 2.7 |
| Łódź | Poland | 5.6^{†} | 4.6 | 4.4 | 3.6^{†} | 3.1 | 4.5^{†} | 3.5 | 3.8 | 3.5 | 3.5 |
| Świętokrzyskie | Poland | 8.9^{†} | 7.0 | 5.8 | 4.1^{†} | 4.3 | 4.5^{†} | 3.8 | 3.8^{‡} | 3.7^{‡} | 4.3 |
| Lublin | Poland | 8.0^{†} | 7.2 | 6.3 | 5.4^{†} | 5.6 | 5.2^{†} | 4.8 | 4.0 | 3.3 | 5.3 |
| Podkarpackie | Poland | 9.6^{†} | 8.4 | 6.5 | 5.0^{†} | 4.3 | 4.8^{†} | 4.7 | 4.3 | 3.7 | 3.6 |
| Podlaskie | Poland | 6.7^{†} | 4.7 | 3.2 | 3.0^{†} | 2.8^{‡} | 3.2^{†‡} | 2.5^{‡} | 2.3^{‡} | 2.9^{‡} | 2.6^{‡} |
| Warsaw capital region | Poland | 3.7^{†} | 3.5 | 2.4 | 2.1^{†} | 2.6 | 2.1^{†} | 2.0 | 1.9 | 2.5 | 2.1 |
| Masovian regional region | Poland | 7.8^{†} | 6.4 | 5.7 | 4.5^{†} | 4.7 | 3.8^{†} | 3.7 | 3.1 | 3.5 | 4.1 |
| Norte | Portugal | 12.2 | 9.8 | 7.3 | 6.7 | 6.9 | 6.7^{†} | 6.0 | 7.0 | 6.6 | 6.3 |
| Algarve | Portugal | 9.3 | 7.7 | 6.4 | 7.0 | 8.4 | 8.6^{†} | 6.0 | 5.7 | 5.8 | 5.7 |
| Centro (NUTS 2021) | Portugal | 8.5 | 7.1 | 5.7 | —N/a | —N/a | —N/a | —N/a | —N/a | —N/a | —N/a |
| Lisbon Metropolitan Area (NUTS 2021) | Portugal | 12.0 | 9.6 | 7.5 | —N/a | —N/a | —N/a | —N/a | —N/a | —N/a | —N/a |
| Alentejo (NUTS 2021) | Portugal | 12.0 | 8.5 | 7.4 | —N/a | —N/a | —N/a | —N/a | —N/a | —N/a | —N/a |
| Azores | Portugal | 10.9 | 8.8 | 8.4 | 7.7 | 5.9 | 7.0^{†‡} | 6.1^{‡} | 6.5^{‡} | 5.6^{‡} | 4.9^{‡} |
| Madeira | Portugal | 12.8 | 10.3 | 8.7 | 6.9 | 7.6 | 7.8^{†} | 6.8^{‡} | 6.0^{‡} | 5.7^{‡} | 5.4^{‡} |
| Centro | Portugal | —N/a | —N/a | —N/a | 4.9 | 5.6 | 5.4^{†} | 4.7 | 5.4 | 5.8 | 5.0 |
| Grande Lisboa | Portugal | —N/a | —N/a | —N/a | 6.7 | 8.1 | 6.8^{†} | 6.8 | 6.7 | 6.5 | 6.4 |
| Península de Setúbal | Portugal | —N/a | —N/a | —N/a | 8.3 | 7.7 | 8.7^{†} | 9.7 | 8.4 | 8.0 | 8.0 |
| Alentejo | Portugal | —N/a | —N/a | —N/a | 7.2 | 6.1 | 6.8^{†} | 4.9 | 6.0 | 5.8 | 5.5 |
| Oeste e Vale do Tejo | Portugal | —N/a | —N/a | —N/a | 5.2 | 5.6 | 6.0^{†} | 5.5 | 5.4 | 6.7 | 5.2 |
| Nord-Vest | Romania | 4.3 | 3.6 | 2.9 | 3.0 | 3.8 | 3.1^{†} | 3.1 | 3.0 | 4.5 | 5.9 |
| Centru | Romania | 5.2 | 4.2 | 4.2 | 5.3 | 7.1 | 5.1^{†} | 5.4 | 4.6 | 4.3 | 4.1 |
| Nord-Est | Romania | 3.0 | 2.9 | 2.4 | 2.1 | 3.0 | 6.8^{†} | 6.6 | 5.9 | 4.9 | 5.7 |
| Sud-Est | Romania | 7.7 | 6.5 | 6.1 | 6.4 | 7.4 | 6.0^{†} | 7.3 | 9.1 | 9.9 | 11.3 |
| Sud - Muntenia | Romania | 8.9 | 6.8 | 5.5 | 4.7 | 5.9 | 7.7^{†} | 7.9 | 7.8 | 7.3 | 8.6 |
| Bucharest - Ilfov | Romania | 4.7 | 4.3 | 3.6 | 2.5 | 4.7 | 3.5^{†} | 2.7 | 2.8 | 2.2 | 1.8 |
| Sud-Vest | Romania | 9.9 | 7.7 | 6.4 | 5.3 | 5.0 | 9.2^{†} | 8.8 | 8.9 | 7.7 | 6.9 |
| Vest | Romania | 4.9 | 4.4 | 3.6 | 3.4 | 4.6 | 3.5^{†} | 3.7 | 2.8 | 3.3 | 5.1 |
| Eastern Slovenia | Slovenia | 8.9 | 6.8 | 5.5 | 4.9 | 5.5 | 5.0^{†} | 4.2 | 3.8 | 4.1 | 4.2 |
| Western Slovenia | Slovenia | 7.1 | 6.4 | 4.8 | 4.0 | 4.4 | 4.5^{†} | 3.8 | 3.5 | 3.3 | 3.6 |
| Bratislava | Slovakia | 5.1 | 4.2 | 2.9 | 2.4 | 3.4 | 2.6^{†‡} | 2.3^{‡} | 2.3 | 2.3^{‡} | 2.5 |
| Western Slovakia | Slovakia | 7.7 | 5.5 | 4.3 | 4.0 | 4.7 | 4.7^{†} | 4.1 | 3.6 | 3.3 | 3.3 |
| Central Slovakia | Slovakia | 10.8 | 9.4 | 7.5 | 6.1 | 6.7 | 7.5^{†} | 6.6 | 5.9 | 5.1 | 5.4 |
| Eastern Slovakia | Slovakia | 13.2 | 12.0 | 10.1 | 9.1 | 10.6 | 10.9^{†} | 10.2 | 10.4 | 9.6 | 9.5 |
| Western Finland (Länsi-Suomi) | Finland | 9.4 | 9.3 | 7.4 | 6.4 | 7.7 | 7.7^{†} | 6.3 | 6.7 | 7.8 | 9.2 |
| Helsinki-Uusimaa | Finland | 7.4 | 7.7 | 6.9 | 6.4 | 7.2 | 7.7^{†} | 6.7 | 7.6 | 8.9 | 10.6 |
| Southern Finland (Etelä-Suomi) | Finland | 9.1 | 8.5 | 7.4 | 6.3 | 7.7 | 7.5^{†} | 7.6 | 7.5 | 8.9 | 9.6 |
| Northern and Eastern Finland | Finland | 10.2 | 9.6 | 8.1 | 7.8 | 8.8 | 7.8^{†} | 6.7 | 6.9 | 7.8 | 9.0 |
| Stockholm | Sweden | 6.5 | 6.3 | 5.6^{†} | 6.1 | 7.6 | 8.3^{†} | 7.0 | 6.9 | 8.3 | 9.1 |
| East Middle Sweden | Sweden | 7.7 | 7.6 | 7.2^{†} | 7.3 | 9.4 | 9.8^{†} | 9.5 | 9.1 | 9.6 | 9.4 |
| Småland and the islands | Sweden | 6.2 | 5.5 | 5.7^{†} | 6.3 | 7.7 | 7.6^{†} | 6.2 | 6.9 | 7.2 | 7.3 |
| South Sweden | Sweden | 8.4 | 8.4 | 8.6^{†} | 8.9 | 10.5 | 11.3^{†} | 9.3 | 9.4 | 9.7 | 10.3 |
| West Sweden | Sweden | 6.5 | 6.0 | 5.6^{†} | 6.1 | 7.6 | 8.5^{†} | 6.4 | 7.4 | 8.4 | 8.5 |
| North Middle Sweden | Sweden | 7.5 | 6.9 | 6.4^{†} | 7.3 | 7.9 | 9.8^{†} | 7.7 | 7.3 | 7.2 | 8.4 |
| Middle Norrland | Sweden | 6.8 | 6.2 | 5.5^{†} | 6.7 | 7.6 | 6.3^{†} | 6.6 | 6.5 | 7.6 | 6.6 |
| Upper Norrland | Sweden | 5.8 | 5.9 | 5.4^{†} | 6.1 | 6.2 | 6.2^{†} | 5.2 | 5.7 | 5.2 | 7.3 |
| Tees Valley and Durham | United Kingdom | 7.0 | 5.2 | 4.4 | 5.7 | —N/a | —N/a | —N/a | —N/a | —N/a | —N/a |
| Northumberland and Tyne and Wear | United Kingdom | 7.1 | 5.9 | 5.2 | 5.6 | —N/a | —N/a | —N/a | —N/a | —N/a | —N/a |
| Cumbria | United Kingdom | 3.7^{‡} | 3.4^{‡} | 1.9^{‡} | 2.0^{‡} | —N/a | —N/a | —N/a | —N/a | —N/a | —N/a |
| Greater Manchester | United Kingdom | 6.1 | 4.0 | 4.2 | 5.1 | —N/a | —N/a | —N/a | —N/a | —N/a | —N/a |
| Lancashire | United Kingdom | 4.4 | 4.2 | 4.8 | 3.7 | —N/a | —N/a | —N/a | —N/a | —N/a | —N/a |
| Cheshire | United Kingdom | 3.2 | 3.1 | 3.2 | 3.2 | —N/a | —N/a | —N/a | —N/a | —N/a | —N/a |
| Merseyside | United Kingdom | 4.9 | 5.2 | 4.0 | 3.8 | —N/a | —N/a | —N/a | —N/a | —N/a | —N/a |
| East Yorkshire and Northern Lincolnshire | United Kingdom | 5.5 | 4.6 | 5.6 | 4.7 | —N/a | —N/a | —N/a | —N/a | —N/a | —N/a |
| North Yorkshire | United Kingdom | 2.9 | 4.1 | 3.3 | 2.7 | —N/a | —N/a | —N/a | —N/a | —N/a | —N/a |
| South Yorkshire | United Kingdom | 7.2 | 5.6 | 5.1 | 5.1 | —N/a | —N/a | —N/a | —N/a | —N/a | —N/a |
| West Yorkshire | United Kingdom | 5.8 | 4.8 | 4.7 | 4.7 | —N/a | —N/a | —N/a | —N/a | —N/a | —N/a |
| Derbyshire and Nottinghamshire | United Kingdom | 4.5 | 3.6 | 4.4 | 3.9 | —N/a | —N/a | —N/a | —N/a | —N/a | —N/a |
| Leicestershire, Rutland and Northamptonshire | United Kingdom | 4.6 | 4.6 | 4.2 | 4.2 | —N/a | —N/a | —N/a | —N/a | —N/a | —N/a |
| Lincolnshire | United Kingdom | 4.3 | 3.8 | 4.2 | 3.7 | —N/a | —N/a | —N/a | —N/a | —N/a | —N/a |
| Herefordshire, Worcestershire and Warwickshire | United Kingdom | 3.7 | 2.9 | 3.1 | 3.0 | —N/a | —N/a | —N/a | —N/a | —N/a | —N/a |
| Shropshire and Staffordshire | United Kingdom | 4.2 | 4.9 | 3.7 | 3.3 | —N/a | —N/a | —N/a | —N/a | —N/a | —N/a |
| West Midlands | United Kingdom | 7.6 | 7.2 | 6.5 | 6.0 | —N/a | —N/a | —N/a | —N/a | —N/a | —N/a |
| East Anglia | United Kingdom | 3.8 | 3.9 | 3.5 | 2.9 | —N/a | —N/a | —N/a | —N/a | —N/a | —N/a |
| Bedfordshire and Hertfordshire | United Kingdom | 4.1 | 3.7 | 2.9 | 2.7 | —N/a | —N/a | —N/a | —N/a | —N/a | —N/a |
| Essex | United Kingdom | 3.9 | 4.2 | 2.8 | 3.2 | —N/a | —N/a | —N/a | —N/a | —N/a | —N/a |
| Inner London - West | United Kingdom | 4.7 | 5.6 | 5.1 | 3.8 | —N/a | —N/a | —N/a | —N/a | —N/a | —N/a |
| Inner London - East | United Kingdom | 7.2 | 5.3 | 4.3 | 4.0 | —N/a | —N/a | —N/a | —N/a | —N/a | —N/a |
| Outer London - East and North East | United Kingdom | 5.6 | 5.7 | 4.6 | 4.4 | —N/a | —N/a | —N/a | —N/a | —N/a | —N/a |
| Outer London - South | United Kingdom | 4.2 | 4.9 | 4.7 | 4.1 | —N/a | —N/a | —N/a | —N/a | —N/a | —N/a |
| Outer London - West and North West | United Kingdom | 5.0 | 4.9 | 4.8 | 5.2 | —N/a | —N/a | —N/a | —N/a | —N/a | —N/a |
| Berkshire, Buckinghamshire and Oxfordshire | United Kingdom | 2.7 | 2.9 | 3.0 | 2.8 | —N/a | —N/a | —N/a | —N/a | —N/a | —N/a |
| Surrey, East Sussex and West Sussex | United Kingdom | 3.6 | 3.2 | 3.6 | 2.6 | —N/a | —N/a | —N/a | —N/a | —N/a | —N/a |
| Hampshire and Isle of Wight | United Kingdom | 3.7 | 3.2 | 2.8 | 3.3 | —N/a | —N/a | —N/a | —N/a | —N/a | —N/a |
| Kent | United Kingdom | 4.5 | 3.8 | 4.4 | 3.9 | —N/a | —N/a | —N/a | —N/a | —N/a | —N/a |
| Gloucestershire, Wiltshire and Bristol | United Kingdom | 3.7 | 4.0 | 2.9 | 2.7 | —N/a | —N/a | —N/a | —N/a | —N/a | —N/a |
| Dorset and Somerset | United Kingdom | 4.3 | 2.9 | 3.1 | 2.1 | —N/a | —N/a | —N/a | —N/a | —N/a | —N/a |
| Cornwall and Isles of Scilly | United Kingdom | 3.8 | 2.4^{‡} | 2.6^{‡} | 2.1^{‡} | —N/a | —N/a | —N/a | —N/a | —N/a | —N/a |
| Devon | United Kingdom | 3.6 | 4.1 | 3.4 | 3.0 | —N/a | —N/a | —N/a | —N/a | —N/a | —N/a |
| West Wales and the Valleys | United Kingdom | 5.0 | 4.6 | 4.9 | 4.1 | —N/a | —N/a | —N/a | —N/a | —N/a | —N/a |
| East Wales | United Kingdom | 3.6 | 4.3 | 2.7 | 3.3 | —N/a | —N/a | —N/a | —N/a | —N/a | —N/a |
| Eastern Scotland | United Kingdom | 4.8 | 3.7 | 3.6 | 3.4 | —N/a | —N/a | —N/a | —N/a | —N/a | —N/a |
| West Central Scotland | United Kingdom | 5.3 | 4.7 | 5.1 | 4.6 | —N/a | —N/a | —N/a | —N/a | —N/a | —N/a |
| Southern Scotland | United Kingdom | 6.3 | 4.7 | 3.2 | 3.1 | —N/a | —N/a | —N/a | —N/a | —N/a | —N/a |
| Scottish Highlands and islands | United Kingdom | 3.5^{‡} | 2.6^{‡} | 2.2^{‡} | —N/a | —N/a | —N/a | —N/a | —N/a | —N/a | —N/a |
| Northern Ireland | United Kingdom | 5.7 | 4.6 | 3.6 | 2.7 | —N/a | —N/a | —N/a | —N/a | —N/a | —N/a |
| Iceland | Iceland | 3.0 | 2.7 | 2.7 | 3.5 | 5.5^{†} | 6.1^{†} | 3.8 | 3.5 | 3.6 | 4.5 |
| Oslo and Akershus (statistical region 2016) | Norway | —N/a | —N/a | —N/a | —N/a | —N/a | —N/a | —N/a | —N/a | —N/a | —N/a |
| Innlandet | Norway | 4.5 | 2.9^{‡} | 2.9^{‡} | 3.3^{‡} | 3.7^{‡} | 3.6^{†‡} | —N/a | 3.0^{‡} | 3.7^{‡} | 4.1^{‡} |
| Sør-Østlandet (statistical region 2016) | Norway | —N/a | —N/a | —N/a | —N/a | —N/a | —N/a | —N/a | —N/a | —N/a | —N/a |
| Rogaland, Vest-Agder & Aust-Agder (statistical region 2016) | Norway | —N/a | —N/a | —N/a | —N/a | —N/a | —N/a | —N/a | —N/a | —N/a | —N/a |
| Vestlandet (statistical region 2016) | Norway | —N/a | —N/a | —N/a | —N/a | —N/a | —N/a | —N/a | —N/a | —N/a | —N/a |
| Trøndelag | Norway | 4.0 | 3.0^{‡} | 3.1^{‡} | 3.9^{‡} | 3.6^{‡} | 3.5^{†‡} | 2.5^{‡} | 3.5^{‡} | 3.8^{‡} | 4.7 |
| Nord-Norge | Norway | 3.2 | 3.2^{‡} | 3.3^{‡} | 3.0^{‡} | 3.5^{‡} | 3.8^{†‡} | 2.2^{‡} | 2.8^{‡} | 2.7^{‡} | 3.5^{‡} |
| Oslo and Viken | Norway | 4.7 | 4.6 | 4.1 | 3.9 | 5.0 | 5.3^{†} | 3.9 | 3.9 | 4.7 | 5.0 |
| Agder and Sør-Østlandet | Norway | 5.2 | 4.6 | 4.0 | 3.7 | 4.3 | 4.4^{†} | 3.7 | 3.7 | 4.1 | 4.6 |
| Vestlandet | Norway | 5.1 | 4.4 | 3.9 | 3.7 | 4.5 | 3.9^{†} | 2.9 | 3.5 | 3.6 | 4.1 |
| Lake Geneva | Switzerland | 7.6 | 7.9 | 7.5 | 7.5 | 7.7 | 7.6^{†} | 6.6 | 6.7 | 7.3 | 7.8 |
| Espace Mittelland | Switzerland | 4.6 | 4.2 | 4.3 | 3.8 | 4.3 | 4.4^{†} | 3.8 | 3.5 | 4.0 | 4.6 |
| Northwestern Switzerland | Switzerland | 5.0 | 4.4 | 4.3 | 3.5 | 4.8 | 4.8^{†} | 4.1 | 3.9 | 4.3 | 4.6 |
| Zürich | Switzerland | 3.9 | 4.5 | 4.3 | 4.0 | 4.3 | 4.7^{†} | 3.7 | 3.4 | 3.8 | 4.5 |
| Eastern Switzerland | Switzerland | 4.0 | 3.8 | 3.6 | 3.5 | 3.9 | 4.0^{†} | 3.0 | 3.1 | 2.8 | 3.3 |
| Central Switzerland | Switzerland | 3.4 | 2.9 | 2.9 | 2.7 | 2.9 | 3.2^{†} | 2.3 | 2.7 | 2.5 | 3.0 |
| Ticino | Switzerland | 6.9 | 6.1 | 6.7 | 6.9 | 6.6 | 8.0^{†} | 6.1 | 6.5 | 6.7 | 6.6 |
| Montenegro | Montenegro | 17.8 | 16.1 | 15.2 | 15.2 | 17.9 | —N/a | —N/a | —N/a | —N/a | —N/a |
| North Macedonia | North Macedonia | 23.7 | 22.4 | 20.8 | 17.3 | 16.4 | 15.5^{†} | 14.4 | 13.1 | 12.3 | 11.5 |
| Belgrade | Serbia | 15.7 | 13.4 | 10.9 | 8.3 | 7.5 | 8.9^{†} | 7.7 | 7.1 | 6.2 | 6.9 |
| Vojvodina | Serbia | 15.2 | 12.2 | 10.5 | 9.1 | 7.6 | 9.6^{†} | 8.0 | 9.0 | 8.4 | 8.0 |
| Šumadija and Western Serbia | Serbia | 14.9 | 13.8 | 14.1 | 11.8 | 10.0 | 13.0^{†} | 11.1 | 9.8 | 8.6 | 8.7 |
| Southern and Eastern Serbia | Serbia | 16.0 | 15.4 | 16.4 | 13.3 | 11.7 | 13.8^{†} | 11.9 | 12.9 | 12.2 | 12.0 |
| Istanbul | Turkey | 13.5 | 13.8 | 12.4 | 14.8 | 14.7 | 12.4^{†} | 10.1 | 8.8 | 8.8 | 9.0 |
| Tekirdağ, Edirne and Kırklareli | Turkey | 7.5 | 8.3 | 7.5 | 11.2 | 9.1 | 9.3^{†} | 7.9 | 7.7 | 6.7 | 7.6 |
| Balıkesir and Çanakkale | Turkey | 6.8 | 5.9 | 5.7 | 8.3 | 7.8 | 8.0^{†} | 7.1 | 6.1 | 6.1 | 5.6 |
| İzmir | Turkey | 13.9 | 14.0 | 13.7 | 15.9 | 17.1 | 14.6^{†} | 13.2 | 11.5 | 11.0 | 10.6 |
| Aydın, Denizli and Muğla | Turkey | 6.7 | 7.1 | 6.9 | 9.2 | 9.7 | 10.1^{†} | 8.7 | 8.2 | 8.2 | 7.0 |
| Manisa, Afyonkarahisar and Kütahya, Uşak | Turkey | 4.9 | 6.1 | 6.8 | 9.8 | 8.3 | 6.9^{†} | 7.3 | 7.3 | 6.4 | 6.4 |
| Bursa, Eskişehir and Bilecik | Turkey | 9.0 | 9.7 | 8.9 | 11.2 | 9.7 | 9.5^{†} | 8.9 | 8.3 | 8.9 | 8.6 |
| Kocaeli, Sakarya, Düzce and Bolu, Yalova | Turkey | 10.6 | 10.8 | 10.2 | 13.4 | 12.2 | 9.5^{†} | 10.2 | 9.1 | 8.5 | 8.5 |
| Ankara | Turkey | 11.4 | 11.3 | 10.1 | 14.2 | 14.8 | 13.5^{†} | 12.2 | 11.3 | 9.7 | 8.5 |
| Konya and Karaman | Turkey | 6.1 | 5.9 | 5.9 | 8.0 | 7.8 | 7.9^{†} | 7.5 | 6.0 | 7.8 | 7.1 |
| Antalya, Isparta, Burdur | Turkey | 11.4 | 11.9 | 11.4 | 13.3 | 12.2 | 11.8^{†} | 9.3 | 7.3 | 5.9 | 5.7 |
| Adana and Mersin | Turkey | 10.4 | 10.7 | 11.2 | 12.0 | 13.3 | 13.3^{†} | 12.5 | 11.0 | 9.2 | 9.8 |
| Hatay, Kahramanmaraş and Osmaniye | Turkey | 14.5 | 11.6 | 14.1 | 18.2 | 15.2 | 17.0^{†} | 14.6 | 15.4 | 11.7 | 10.0 |
| Kırıkkale, Aksaray, Niğde and Nevşehir, Kırşehir | Turkey | 13.4 | 11.3 | 10.9 | 13.2 | 11.9 | 12.9^{†} | 9.5 | 8.7 | 8.3 | 8.3 |
| Kayseri, Sivas and Yozgat | Turkey | 8.4 | 11.7 | 13.1 | 14.4 | 12.7 | 11.8^{†} | 9.4 | 9.4 | 9.0 | 6.8 |
| Zonguldak, Karabük and Bartın | Turkey | 8.7 | 7.2 | 8.1 | 9.6 | 9.3 | 10.7^{†} | 11.3 | 10.8 | 9.3 | 10.4 |
| Kastamonu, Çankırı and Sinop | Turkey | 5.8 | 4.6 | 5.2 | 7.7 | 6.6 | 6.2^{†} | 6.5 | 5.1 | 4.7 | 5.6 |
| Samsun, Tokat, Çorum and Amasya | Turkey | 8.0 | 6.8 | 6.4 | 8.3 | 8.4 | 7.9^{†} | 8.2 | 8.7 | 7.0 | 6.9 |
| Trabzon, Ordu, Giresun and Rize, Artvin and Gümüşhane | Turkey | 4.5 | 3.5 | 6.1 | 9.9 | 8.8 | 9.7^{†} | 9.2 | 8.6 | 8.0 | 6.8 |
| Erzurum, Erzincan and Bayburt | Turkey | 5.0 | 5.3 | 7.5 | 11.3 | 10.1 | 10.0^{†} | 9.3 | 7.6 | 6.4 | 7.3 |
| Ağrı, Kars, Iğdır and Ardahan | Turkey | 4.9 | 5.5 | 5.3 | 9.6 | 11.5 | 14.0^{†} | 13.0 | 11.7 | 10.3 | 8.2 |
| Malatya, Elazığ, Bingöl and Tunceli | Turkey | 8.9 | 6.9 | 8.1 | 9.9 | 10.6 | 10.5^{†} | 8.3 | 7.3 | 6.0 | 8.4 |
| Van, Muş, Bitlis and Hakkâri | Turkey | 9.1 | 12.6 | 21.7 | 25.7 | 23.6 | 20.4^{†} | 19.3 | 17.6 | 15.2 | 11.6 |
| Gaziantep, Adıyaman and Kilis | Turkey | 13.9 | 14.3 | 12.3 | 15.2 | 13.0 | 10.2^{†} | 10.7 | 10.1 | 10.7 | 10.0 |
| Şanlıurfa and Diyarbakır | Turkey | 17.2 | 13.8 | 18.6 | 23.2 | 20.0 | 14.8^{†} | 11.4 | 10.9 | 9.3 | 8.8 |
| Mardin, Batman, Şırnak and Siirt | Turkey | 28.1 | 26.9 | 24.8 | 30.8 | 33.4 | 30.5^{†} | 18.6 | 11.5 | 11.0 | 10.0 |

== 2006 to 2015 list ==
List of European regions and territories by unemployment rate in percent, 2006–2025
| Region (NUTS2) | Country | 2006 | 2007 | 2008 | 2009 | 2010 | 2011 | 2012 | 2013 | 2014 | 2015 |
|---|---|---|---|---|---|---|---|---|---|---|---|
| Brussels | Belgium | 17.6 | 17.1 | 16.0 | 15.7 | 17.3 | 17.0^{†} | 17.4 | 19.2 | 18.3 | 17.3 |
| Antwerp | Belgium | 5.7 | 5.0 | 4.6 | 5.7 | 6.1 | 5.7^{†} | 5.3 | 6.2 | 6.1 | 6.1 |
| Limburg | Belgium | 6.2 | 5.3 | 4.4 | 5.4 | 5.3 | 4.6^{†} | 4.7 | 5.5 | 5.6 | 6.0 |
| East Flanders | Belgium | 4.5 | 4.8 | 3.6 | 4.2 | 5.3 | 3.8^{†} | 4.1 | 4.0 | 4.3 | 4.4 |
| Flemish Brabant | Belgium | 4.2 | 3.4 | 4.2 | 4.9 | 4.9 | 3.5^{†} | 4.4 | 5.5 | 5.0 | 5.1 |
| West Flanders | Belgium | 4.2 | 3.0 | 2.7 | 4.3 | 3.8 | 3.2^{†} | 3.9 | 3.9 | 4.2 | 4.2 |
| Walloon Brabant | Belgium | 7.6 | 7.0 | 6.5 | 6.9 | 8.4 | 6.7^{†} | 7.0 | 8.2 | 8.9 | 7.9 |
| Hainaut | Belgium | 14.4 | 12.8 | 11.7 | 13.2 | 13.9 | 11.7^{†} | 12.1 | 13.3 | 14.4 | 13.3 |
| Liège | Belgium | 11.5 | 10.9 | 10.5 | 12.1 | 11.5 | 9.5^{†} | 10.7 | 11.7 | 12.3 | 12.9 |
| Luxembourg | Belgium | 7.8 | 6.8 | 7.7 | 7.4 | 7.5 | 6.2^{†} | 7.6 | 7.9 | 8.5 | 9.3 |
| Namur | Belgium | 10.6 | 8.5 | 8.8 | 9.4 | 9.6 | 8.0^{†} | 7.3 | 10.4 | 8.9 | 10.9 |
| Severozapaden | Bulgaria | 11.0 | 9.0 | 7.1^{†} | 8.0 | 11.2^{†} | 12.8^{†} | 12.3 | 14.0 | 14.2 | 12.1 |
| Severen tsentralen | Bulgaria | 13.5 | 10.7 | 8.5^{†} | 8.4 | 11.6^{†} | 12.8^{†} | 14.4 | 15.3 | 13.2 | 10.6 |
| Severoiztochen | Bulgaria | 11.0 | 10.8 | 8.7^{†} | 10.4 | 14.6^{†} | 15.4^{†} | 18.3 | 16.8 | 12.7 | 10.3 |
| Yugoiztochen | Bulgaria | 8.1 | 6.5 | 5.8^{†} | 6.6 | 10.5^{†} | 11.5^{†} | 12.0 | 13.0 | 11.9 | 10.4 |
| Yugozapaden | Bulgaria | 6.5 | 4.0 | 2.9^{†} | 4.1 | 6.9^{†} | 7.5^{†} | 8.2 | 9.8 | 8.9 | 6.7 |
| Yuzhen tsentralen | Bulgaria | 8.2 | 5.6 | 5.1^{†} | 7.3 | 11.5^{†} | 12.9^{†} | 13.8 | 13.5 | 12.0 | 9.3 |
| Prague | Czech Republic | 2.8 | 2.4 | 1.9 | 3.1 | 3.8 | 3.6^{†} | 3.1 | 3.1 | 2.5 | 2.8 |
| Central Bohemia | Czech Republic | 4.6 | 3.4 | 2.6 | 4.4 | 5.2 | 5.1^{†} | 4.6 | 5.2 | 5.1 | 3.5 |
| Jihozápad | Czech Republic | 4.9 | 3.5 | 3.1 | 5.2 | 5.6 | 5.3^{†} | 5.3 | 5.2 | 5.5 | 3.9 |
| Severozápad | Czech Republic | 12.8 | 9.5 | 7.9 | 10.3 | 11.1 | 9.5^{†} | 10.7 | 9.6 | 8.7 | 7.3 |
| Severovýchod | Czech Republic | 6.1 | 4.8 | 4.0 | 7.3 | 7.0 | 6.6^{†} | 8.0 | 8.3 | 6.4 | 5.2 |
| Jihovýchod | Czech Republic | 7.1 | 5.2 | 4.1 | 6.5 | 7.5 | 7.2^{†} | 7.6 | 6.8 | 6.0 | 4.9 |
| Central Moravia | Czech Republic | 7.7 | 6.0 | 4.9 | 7.5 | 8.8 | 7.6^{†} | 7.5 | 8.0 | 6.9 | 5.3 |
| Moravian-Silesia | Czech Republic | 12.0 | 8.5 | 7.4 | 9.7 | 10.2 | 9.3^{†} | 9.5 | 9.9 | 8.6 | 8.2 |
| Capital Region of Denmark | Denmark | —N/a | 4.3 | 3.9^{†} | 6.5 | 8.0 | 8.3 | 8.4 | 7.7 | 7.5 | 6.8 |
| Central Denmark | Denmark | —N/a | 3.3 | 3.5^{†} | 6.2 | 7.6 | 7.1 | 7.2 | 6.9 | 6.3 | 5.7 |
| North Denmark | Denmark | —N/a | 4.4 | 3.8^{†} | 7.4 | 7.7 | 8.1 | 8.2 | 6.9 | 6.9 | 6.4 |
| Southern Denmark | Denmark | —N/a | 3.5 | 3.6^{†} | 6.5 | 8.0 | 7.7 | 8.0 | 7.7 | 7.0 | 6.2 |
| Zealand | Denmark | —N/a | 3.6 | 3.5^{†} | 5.6 | 7.1 | 7.4 | 6.7 | 7.3 | 6.6 | 6.0 |
| Stuttgart (district) | Germany | 6.5^{†} | 5.1 | 4.3 | 5.3 | 5.0^{†} | 3.7^{†} | 3.4^{†} | 3.7 | 3.1 | 3.4 |
| Karlsruhe (district) | Germany | 7.2^{†} | 5.5 | 4.9 | 5.6 | 5.2^{†} | 4.2^{†} | 4.0^{†} | 3.6 | 3.5 | 3.3 |
| Freiburg (district) | Germany | 5.5^{†} | 4.3 | 3.8 | 4.4 | 3.9^{†} | 3.0^{†} | 2.9^{†} | 2.9 | 3.0 | 2.5 |
| Tübingen (district) | Germany | 5.9^{†} | 4.6 | 3.8 | 5.0 | 4.5^{†} | 3.1^{†} | 2.7^{†} | 2.9 | 2.7 | 3.0 |
| Upper Bavaria | Germany | 5.3^{†} | 4.4 | 3.4 | 4.2 | 3.6^{†} | 2.8^{†} | 2.7^{†} | 2.5 | 2.5 | 2.7 |
| Lower Bavaria | Germany | 6.6^{†} | 5.0 | 4.2 | 5.1 | 3.9^{†} | 2.8^{†} | 3.3^{†} | 3.2 | 2.9 | 2.5 |
| Upper Palatinate | Germany | 6.9^{†} | 5.3 | 4.3 | 5.0 | 4.0^{†} | 3.4^{†} | 3.2^{†} | 3.4 | 2.7 | 2.8 |
| Upper Franconia | Germany | 9.6^{†} | 7.7 | 6.2 | 6.7 | 5.9^{†} | 4.2^{†} | 3.3^{†} | 3.9 | 4.0 | 3.9 |
| Middle Franconia | Germany | 7.9^{†} | 6.7 | 5.5 | 6.4 | 5.5^{†} | 4.0^{†} | 3.7^{†} | 3.1 | 3.1 | 3.0 |
| Lower Franconia | Germany | 6.3^{†} | 5.9 | 4.5 | 5.7 | 5.1^{†} | 3.5^{†} | 3.5^{†} | 3.3 | 2.9 | 3.0 |
| Swabia | Germany | 6.3^{†} | 5.0 | 4.2 | 4.7 | 4.2^{†} | 3.4^{†} | 3.2^{†} | 3.3 | 3.0 | 3.0 |
| Berlin | Germany | 18.7^{†} | 16.4 | 15.2 | 13.7 | 12.8^{†} | 11.7^{†} | 10.4^{†} | 10.4 | 9.8 | 9.5 |
| Brandenburg | Germany | 16.6^{†} | 13.8 | 11.5 | 11.4 | 9.9^{†} | 8.8^{†} | 8.2^{†} | 7.3 | 6.7 | 5.7 |
| Bremen | Germany | 14.4^{†} | 11.9 | 9.6 | 9.1 | 7.9^{†} | 7.8^{†} | 6.6^{†} | 7.0 | 6.6 | 5.6 |
| Hamburg | Germany | 9.9^{†} | 9.0 | 7.1 | 7.2 | 7.0^{†} | 5.3^{†} | 5.3^{†} | 4.7 | 5.0 | 4.3 |
| Darmstadt (district) | Germany | 8.0^{†} | 7.2 | 6.2 | 6.3 | 5.8^{†} | 4.7^{†} | 4.8^{†} | 4.3 | 4.5 | 4.1 |
| Gießen (district) | Germany | 8.5^{†} | 7.2 | 6.6 | 6.7 | 6.0^{†} | 5.1^{†} | 5.0^{†} | 4.5 | 4.5 | 3.9 |
| Kassel (district) | Germany | 8.5^{†} | 8.0 | 7.5 | 6.6 | 6.0^{†} | 4.4^{†} | 4.5^{†} | 4.3 | 4.4 | 3.6 |
| Mecklenburg-Vorpommern | Germany | 19.2^{†} | 17.5 | 14.7 | 13.9 | 12.3^{†} | 10.1^{†} | 10.8^{†} | 10.1 | 9.6 | 7.8 |
| Braunschweig (district) | Germany | 10.1^{†} | 8.9 | 8.7 | 8.5 | 7.1^{†} | 6.3^{†} | 5.6^{†} | 6.2 | 5.5 | 4.9 |
| Hanover (district) | Germany | 10.5^{†} | 8.4 | 7.6 | 7.9 | 7.0^{†} | 6.7^{†} | 5.4^{†} | 5.4 | 5.2 | 4.7 |
| Lüneburg (district) | Germany | 9.0^{†} | 7.4 | 6.3 | 5.5 | 5.7^{†} | 5.3^{†} | 4.4^{†} | 4.4 | 4.0 | 3.5 |
| Weser-Ems (district) | Germany | 9.4^{†} | 7.1 | 6.2 | 5.9 | 5.9^{†} | 4.2^{†} | 4.3^{†} | 4.0 | 4.1 | 4.0 |
| Düsseldorf (district) | Germany | 9.8^{†} | 8.6 | 7.4 | 7.7 | 7.6^{†} | 6.8^{†} | 6.5^{†} | 6.4 | 6.4 | 5.9 |
| Cologne (district) | Germany | 9.1^{†} | 7.8 | 7.0 | 7.2 | 7.0^{†} | 6.0^{†} | 5.4^{†} | 5.8 | 5.3 | 4.8 |
| Münster (district) | Germany | 9.1^{†} | 7.3 | 6.5 | 7.3 | 6.6^{†} | 5.3^{†} | 4.9^{†} | 5.1 | 4.9 | 4.4 |
| Detmold (district) | Germany | 10.0^{†} | 8.1 | 7.2 | 7.8 | 7.0^{†} | 5.5^{†} | 4.7^{†} | 5.0 | 5.0 | 4.7 |
| Arnsberg (district) | Germany | 11.2^{†} | 9.7 | 8.7 | 9.2 | 8.2^{†} | 7.1^{†} | 6.6^{†} | 6.6 | 5.7 | 5.7 |
| Koblenz (district) | Germany | 7.8^{†} | 6.3 | 5.8 | 6.7 | 5.1^{†} | 4.4^{†} | 4.0^{†} | 3.8 | 4.1 | 3.4 |
| Trier (district) | Germany | 6.2^{†} | 5.3 | 5.2 | 4.6 | 4.1^{†} | 4.1^{†} | 2.7^{†} | 3.1 | 3.0 | 2.9 |
| Rheinhessen-Pfalz (district) | Germany | 8.7^{†} | 5.9 | 5.7 | 5.9 | 6.1^{†} | 5.2^{†} | 4.3^{†} | 4.4 | 4.0 | 4.1 |
| Saarland | Germany | 9.5^{†} | 7.3 | 7.1 | 8.4 | 6.9^{†} | 5.9^{†} | 6.3^{†} | 6.0 | 5.8 | 5.6 |
| Dresden (district) | Germany | 16.3^{†} | 13.4 | 12.3 | 12.0 | 10.3^{†} | 8.6^{†} | 7.5^{†} | 7.3 | 7.4 | 6.2 |
| Chemnitz (district) | Germany | 16.5^{†} | 13.9 | 12.7 | 12.6 | 11.5^{†} | 8.8^{†} | 7.9^{†} | 7.4 | 6.4 | 5.4 |
| Leipzig (district) | Germany | 17.8^{†} | 17.3 | 14.3 | 13.1 | 12.1^{†} | 11.1^{†} | 9.5^{†} | 9.2 | 8.3 | 7.7 |
| Saxony-Anhalt | Germany | 17.8^{†} | 15.7 | 14.6 | 13.7 | 11.4^{†} | 10.4^{†} | 9.5^{†} | 9.1 | 8.8 | 8.0 |
| Schleswig-Holstein | Germany | 9.1^{†} | 8.0 | 6.8 | 7.3 | 6.7^{†} | 5.8^{†} | 5.0^{†} | 4.9 | 4.6 | 4.2 |
| Thuringia | Germany | 15.7^{†} | 13.8 | 10.7 | 10.7 | 8.6^{†} | 7.6^{†} | 7.3^{†} | 6.0 | 6.0 | 5.8 |
| Estonia | Estonia | 5.9 | 4.6 | 5.5 | 13.5 | 16.7 | 12.3 | 10.0 | 8.6 | 7.4 | 6.4 |
| Northern and Western | Ireland | —N/a | —N/a | —N/a | —N/a | —N/a | —N/a | 15.8 | 13.2 | 11.6 | 10.1 |
| Southern | Ireland | —N/a | —N/a | —N/a | —N/a | —N/a | —N/a | 16.6 | 14.3 | 12.7 | 10.7 |
| Eastern and Midland | Ireland | —N/a | —N/a | —N/a | —N/a | —N/a | —N/a | 14.6 | 13.6 | 11.5 | 9.4 |
| Eastern Macedonia and Thrace | Greece | 11.1 | 9.9 | 8.8 | 11.1^{†} | 14.6 | 20.2 | 22.9 | 26.8 | 24.3 | 23.4 |
| Central Macedonia | Greece | 9.5 | 9.1 | 8.5 | 10.1^{†} | 13.7 | 19.8 | 26.2 | 30.2 | 28.7 | 26.0 |
| Western Macedonia | Greece | 14.2 | 12.1 | 12.5 | 12.5^{†} | 15.4 | 23.1 | 29.7 | 31.6 | 27.6 | 30.8 |
| Epirus | Greece | 9.8 | 10.0 | 9.9 | 11.3^{†} | 12.7 | 16.5 | 22.6 | 27.4 | 26.8 | 24.6 |
| Thessaly | Greece | 8.2 | 7.8 | 8.4 | 9.3^{†} | 12.1 | 16.9 | 22.7 | 25.5 | 25.6 | 27.1 |
| Ionian Islands | Greece | 11.3 | 9.0 | 8.3 | 9.5^{†} | 14.6 | 14.2 | 14.8 | 18.1 | 21.4 | 19.0 |
| Western Greece | Greece | 9.7 | 9.9 | 9.9 | 9.8^{†} | 11.9 | 17.6 | 25.6 | 28.4 | 28.7 | 28.5 |
| Central Greece | Greece | 9.2 | 9.4 | 8.5 | 10.5^{†} | 12.6 | 19.1 | 27.9 | 28.2 | 26.9 | 26.0 |
| Peloponnese | Greece | 7.6 | 7.4 | 7.1 | 8.0^{†} | 9.7 | 13.8 | 19.2 | 22.0 | 23.4 | 22.3 |
| Attica | Greece | 8.5 | 7.8 | 6.7 | 9.1^{†} | 12.6 | 18.0 | 25.8 | 28.7 | 27.4 | 25.2 |
| North Aegean | Greece | 9.6 | 8.1 | 4.7 | 6.6^{†} | 9.5 | 15.0 | 21.8 | 22.0 | 22.4 | 18.0 |
| South Aegean | Greece | 9.0 | 9.4 | 8.4 | 12.3^{†} | 14.6 | 15.3 | 15.5 | 21.3 | 20.1 | 14.9 |
| Crete | Greece | 7.2 | 5.4 | 6.5 | 9.1^{†} | 12.0 | 15.9 | 22.3 | 25.0 | 24.0 | 24.3 |
| Galicia | Spain | 8.4^{†} | 7.6 | 8.6 | 12.4 | 15.3 | 17.3 | 20.6 | 22.1 | 21.7 | 19.3 |
| Asturias | Spain | 9.2^{†} | 8.4 | 8.5 | 13.4 | 15.9 | 17.8 | 21.8 | 24.1 | 21.1 | 19.1 |
| Cantabria | Spain | 6.5^{†} | 6.0 | 7.2 | 12.0 | 13.7 | 15.3 | 17.8 | 20.5 | 19.4 | 17.7 |
| Basque Country | Spain | 7.2^{†} | 6.2 | 6.6 | 11.3 | 10.7 | 12.4 | 15.6 | 16.6 | 16.3 | 14.8 |
| Navarre | Spain | 5.4^{†} | 4.7 | 6.8 | 10.8 | 11.9 | 13.0 | 16.2 | 18.0 | 15.7 | 13.8 |
| La Rioja | Spain | 6.1^{†} | 5.8 | 7.9 | 12.7 | 14.2 | 17.2 | 20.6 | 20.0 | 18.2 | 15.4 |
| Aragon | Spain | 5.5^{†} | 5.3 | 7.3 | 13.1 | 15.0 | 17.1 | 18.7 | 21.4 | 20.2 | 16.3 |
| Community of Madrid | Spain | 6.3^{†} | 6.2 | 8.6 | 13.9 | 15.9 | 16.4 | 18.6 | 19.8 | 18.8 | 17.1 |
| Castile and León | Spain | 8.1^{†} | 7.1 | 9.6 | 14.0 | 15.8 | 16.9 | 19.8 | 21.8 | 20.8 | 18.3 |
| Castilla–La Mancha | Spain | 8.8^{†} | 7.7 | 11.7 | 18.9 | 21.2 | 23.1 | 28.6 | 30.0 | 29.0 | 26.4 |
| Extremadura | Spain | 13.3^{†} | 13.0 | 15.4 | 20.6 | 23.0 | 25.1 | 33.1 | 33.9 | 29.8 | 29.1 |
| Catalonia | Spain | 6.5^{†} | 6.5 | 8.9 | 16.2 | 17.7 | 19.2 | 22.5 | 23.1 | 20.3 | 18.6 |
| Valencia | Spain | 8.3^{†} | 8.7 | 12.0 | 20.8 | 22.9 | 24.0 | 27.2 | 28.1 | 25.8 | 22.8 |
| Balearic Islands | Spain | 6.5^{†} | 7.2 | 10.2 | 17.9 | 20.1 | 21.9 | 23.2 | 22.3 | 20.0 | 17.3 |
| Andalusia | Spain | 12.6^{†} | 12.8 | 17.7 | 25.3 | 27.8 | 30.1 | 34.4 | 36.2 | 34.8 | 31.6 |
| Murcia | Spain | 7.9^{†} | 7.5 | 12.4 | 20.3 | 22.9 | 25.0 | 27.6 | 29.0 | 26.6 | 24.6 |
| Ceuta | Spain | 21.5^{†} | 21.0 | 17.4 | 18.6 | 24.0 | 27.7 | 37.0 | 34.8 | 31.9 | 27.6 |
| Melilla | Spain | 13.6^{†‡} | 18.2 | 20.0 | 23.5 | 22.8 | 22.4 | 26.9 | 32.5 | 28.4 | 34.0 |
| Canary Islands | Spain | 11.6^{†} | 10.5 | 17.3 | 26.0 | 28.6 | 29.3 | 32.6 | 33.7 | 32.4 | 29.1 |
| Île-de-France (Paris Metro) | France | 8.5^{†} | 7.8 | 6.9 | 8.1 | 8.6 | 8.2 | 8.1 | 9.0 | 9.7 | 9.6 |
| Centre-Val de Loire | France | 6.9^{†} | 5.8 | 5.5 | 6.7 | 7.0 | 8.3 | 10.8 | 10.6 | 9.5 | 10.7 |
| Champagne-Ardenne | France | 6.8^{†} | 8.0 | 7.5 | 9.2 | 9.2 | 10.3 | 10.7 | 10.5 | 11.4 | 13.0 |
| Picardy | France | 10.2^{†} | 9.9 | 7.2 | 10.3 | 11.4 | 9.0 | 10.6 | 11.5 | 11.6 | 10.8 |
| Upper Normandy | France | 8.8^{†} | 8.6 | 8.4 | 10.0 | 9.7 | 8.9 | 10.9 | 11.6 | 12.0 | 10.6 |
| Lower Normandy | France | 7.2^{†} | 5.6 | 6.3 | 6.9 | 8.2 | 9.2 | 8.8 | 9.1 | 8.2 | 8.2 |
| Burgundy | France | 8.4^{†} | 6.7 | 6.4 | 7.9 | 8.9 | 8.8 | 8.8 | 10.6 | 10.7 | 8.8 |
| Nord-Pas-de-Calais | France | 12.0^{†} | 11.3 | 11.0 | 13.2 | 12.5 | 12.3 | 13.1 | 14.7 | 13.8 | 13.8 |
| Lorraine | France | 9.5^{†} | 7.5 | 8.1 | 11.2 | 9.4 | 10.1 | 11.7 | 12.2 | 11.8 | 12.2 |
| Alsace | France | 6.4^{†} | 5.9 | 5.9 | 8.2 | 8.1 | 7.4 | 8.5 | 9.7 | 10.1 | 9.1 |
| Franche-Comté | France | 7.6^{†} | 7.2 | 6.9 | 8.9 | 8.2 | 7.9 | 9.0 | 9.5 | 9.9 | 9.3 |
| Pays de la Loire | France | 6.9^{†} | 5.9 | 6.1 | 7.6 | 8.5 | 8.5 | 8.4 | 8.8 | 8.6 | 9.1 |
| Brittany | France | 7.3^{†} | 6.7 | 5.2 | 5.6 | 6.8 | 7.1 | 8.0 | 8.0 | 7.4 | 7.8 |
| Poitou-Charentes | France | 7.7^{†} | 6.5 | 7.0 | 8.4 | 7.7 | 8.1 | 8.3 | 9.9 | 10.9 | 9.8 |
| Aquitaine | France | 7.5^{†} | 6.9 | 7.1 | 8.3 | 8.1 | 9.0 | 9.4 | 8.9 | 9.1 | 9.7 |
| Midi-Pyrénées | France | 7.9^{†} | 7.9 | 6.1 | 8.8 | 7.8 | 8.1 | 8.3 | 8.6 | 9.1 | 8.6 |
| Limousin | France | 5.8^{†} | 6.8 | 5.4 | 6.2 | 7.0 | 7.5 | 6.7 | 6.9 | 9.3 | 8.9 |
| Rhône-Alpes | France | 7.3^{†} | 6.3 | 6.3 | 8.4 | 8.1 | 7.7 | 8.1 | 8.4 | 8.8 | 9.1 |
| Auvergne | France | 7.3^{†} | 8.3 | 6.4 | 7.4 | 7.1 | 8.4 | 10.1 | 8.9 | 7.3 | 8.6 |
| Languedoc-Roussillon | France | 11.0^{†} | 10.1 | 9.4 | 13.3 | 13.7 | 11.9 | 15.0 | 12.9 | 12.3 | 13.0 |
| Provence-Alpes-Côte d'Azur | France | 11.0^{†} | 9.0 | 7.8 | 9.2 | 9.7 | 9.8 | 9.6 | 10.9 | 10.1 | 11.0 |
| Corsica | France | 10.7^{†‡} | 11.1^{‡} | 7.9^{‡} | —N/a | 6.0^{‡} | —N/a | 7.9^{‡} | 12.3^{‡} | 9.8^{‡} | 11.9^{‡} |
| Guadeloupe | France | 26.9^{†} | 22.6 | 21.9 | 23.4 | 23.8 | 22.6 | 23.0 | 26.2 | 23.9 | 23.6 |
| Martinique | France | 24.1^{†} | 21.1 | 22.3 | 21.9 | 21.0 | 20.8 | 21.0 | 22.9 | 19.4 | 18.0 |
| French Guiana | France | 28.5^{†} | 20.1 | 21.4 | 20.2 | 21.0 | 21.1 | 22.3 | 21.3 | 22.2 | 21.9 |
| Réunion | France | 28.3^{†} | 24.1 | 24.4 | 27.1 | 28.9 | 29.6 | 28.6 | 28.9 | 26.4 | 23.5 |
| Mayotte | France | —N/a | —N/a | —N/a | —N/a | —N/a | —N/a | —N/a | 19.4 | 20.3 | 25.3 |
| Adriatic Croatia | Croatia | —N/a | 9.3^{†} | 8.7 | 9.5 | 11.2 | 13.0 | 14.8 | 14.9 | 16.7 | 16.7 |
| Continental Croatia (NUTS 2016) | Croatia | —N/a | 9.6^{†} | 8.2 | 8.9 | 11.9 | 13.8 | 16.7 | 18.3 | 17.5 | 15.9 |
| Pannonian Croatia | Croatia | —N/a | —N/a | —N/a | —N/a | —N/a | —N/a | —N/a | —N/a | —N/a | —N/a |
| City of Zagreb | Croatia | —N/a | —N/a | —N/a | —N/a | —N/a | —N/a | —N/a | —N/a | —N/a | —N/a |
| Northern Croatia | Croatia | —N/a | —N/a | —N/a | —N/a | —N/a | —N/a | —N/a | —N/a | —N/a | —N/a |
| Piedmont | Italy | 4.1 | 4.2 | 5.1 | 6.8 | 7.5 | 7.6 | 9.2 | 10.6 | 11.3 | 10.3 |
| Aosta Valley | Italy | 2.9^{‡} | 3.2^{‡} | 3.3^{‡} | 4.5 | 4.5 | 5.3 | 7.1 | 8.3 | 8.9 | 8.9 |
| Liguria | Italy | 4.8 | 4.8 | 5.4 | 5.8 | 6.6 | 6.4 | 8.1 | 9.9 | 10.9 | 9.2 |
| Lombardy | Italy | 3.7 | 3.4 | 3.7 | 5.3 | 5.6 | 5.7 | 7.4 | 8.0 | 8.2 | 7.9 |
| South Tyrol | Italy | 2.6 | 2.6 | 2.4 | 2.9 | 2.7 | 3.3 | 4.1 | 4.4 | 4.4 | 3.8 |
| Trentino | Italy | 3.1 | 2.9 | 3.3 | 3.5 | 4.3 | 4.4 | 6.1 | 6.5 | 7.0 | 6.8 |
| Veneto | Italy | 4.1 | 3.4 | 3.4 | 4.7 | 5.7 | 4.9 | 6.4 | 7.6 | 7.5 | 7.1 |
| Friuli-Venezia Giulia | Italy | 3.5 | 3.4 | 4.3 | 5.2 | 5.7 | 5.2 | 6.8 | 7.7 | 8.0 | 8.0 |
| Emilia-Romagna | Italy | 3.4 | 2.9 | 3.2 | 4.7 | 5.6 | 5.2 | 7.0 | 8.4 | 8.4 | 7.8 |
| Tuscany | Italy | 4.9 | 4.4 | 5.1 | 5.8 | 6.1 | 6.4 | 7.8 | 8.7 | 10.1 | 9.2 |
| Umbria | Italy | 5.1 | 4.6 | 4.8 | 6.6 | 6.6 | 6.4 | 9.5 | 10.3 | 11.3 | 10.5 |
| Marche | Italy | 4.6 | 4.1 | 4.7 | 6.6 | 5.7 | 6.8 | 9.1 | 11.0 | 10.1 | 10.0 |
| Lazio | Italy | 7.5 | 6.4 | 7.5 | 8.4 | 9.2 | 8.8 | 10.6 | 12.0 | 12.5 | 11.8 |
| Abruzzo | Italy | 6.6 | 6.2 | 6.6 | 8.0 | 8.7 | 8.6 | 10.8 | 11.3 | 12.6 | 12.6 |
| Molise | Italy | 9.9 | 8.1 | 9.2 | 9.0 | 8.4 | 10.0 | 12.0 | 15.6 | 15.2 | 14.4 |
| Campania | Italy | 12.9 | 11.2 | 12.6 | 12.9 | 14.0 | 15.4 | 19.3 | 21.5 | 21.8 | 19.8 |
| Apulia | Italy | 12.6 | 11.1 | 11.6 | 12.6 | 13.5 | 13.2 | 15.7 | 19.8 | 21.5 | 19.7 |
| Basilicata | Italy | 10.6 | 9.4 | 11.0 | 11.2 | 12.9 | 11.9 | 14.5 | 15.3 | 14.7 | 13.7 |
| Calabria | Italy | 12.8 | 11.1 | 12.0 | 11.3 | 11.9 | 12.7 | 19.4 | 22.3 | 23.5 | 23.0 |
| Sicily | Italy | 13.4 | 12.9 | 13.7 | 13.8 | 14.6 | 14.3 | 18.4 | 21.0 | 22.2 | 21.4 |
| Sardinia | Italy | 10.8 | 9.8 | 12.2 | 13.2 | 14.1 | 13.6 | 15.5 | 17.5 | 18.7 | 17.4 |
| Cyprus | Cyprus | 4.6 | 3.9 | 3.7 | 5.4^{†} | 6.3 | 7.9 | 11.9 | 15.9 | 16.1 | 15.0 |
| Latvia | Latvia | 7.0 | 6.1 | 7.7 | 17.5 | 19.5 | 16.2 | 15.0 | 11.9 | 10.8 | 9.9 |
| Middle and Western Lithuania | Lithuania | —N/a | —N/a | —N/a | —N/a | —N/a | —N/a | —N/a | 12.6 | 11.6 | 9.8 |
| Capital Region | Lithuania | —N/a | —N/a | —N/a | —N/a | —N/a | —N/a | —N/a | 9.7 | 8.5 | 7.6 |
| Luxembourg | Luxembourg | 4.7 | 4.1^{†} | 5.1 | 5.1^{†} | 4.4 | 4.9 | 5.1 | 5.9 | 5.9 | 6.7^{†} |
| Budapest | Hungary | —N/a | —N/a | —N/a | —N/a | —N/a | —N/a | —N/a | 8.5 | 6.0 | 5.1 |
| Pest County | Hungary | —N/a | —N/a | —N/a | —N/a | —N/a | —N/a | —N/a | 9.1 | 6.5 | 5.7 |
| Central Transdanubia | Hungary | 6.0 | 4.9 | 5.8 | 9.2 | 10.0 | 9.5 | 9.9 | 8.7 | 5.6 | 4.4 |
| Western Transdanubia | Hungary | 5.8 | 5.1 | 5.0 | 8.7 | 9.3 | 7.3 | 7.5 | 7.7 | 4.6 | 3.8 |
| Southern Transdanubia | Hungary | 9.2 | 9.9 | 10.3 | 11.2 | 12.4 | 12.9 | 12.1 | 9.3 | 7.8 | 8.1 |
| Northern Hungary | Hungary | 10.9 | 12.6 | 13.3 | 15.3 | 16.2 | 16.4 | 16.1 | 12.6 | 10.4 | 8.7 |
| Northern Great Plain | Hungary | 10.9 | 10.7 | 12.1 | 14.1 | 14.4 | 14.6 | 13.9 | 14.2 | 11.8 | 10.9 |
| Southern Great Plain | Hungary | 8.0 | 8.0 | 8.7 | 10.6 | 10.4 | 10.5 | 10.3 | 11.0 | 9.0 | 7.9 |
| Malta | Malta | 6.8 | 6.5 | 6.0 | 6.9 | 6.9 | 6.4 | 6.2 | 6.1 | 5.7 | 5.4 |
| Groningen | Netherlands | 7.2^{†} | 7.5 | 5.9 | 6.8 | 6.2 | 6.8 | 7.0 | 8.3^{†} | 8.6 | 9.1 |
| Friesland | Netherlands | 5.3^{†} | 3.7 | 3.8 | 4.4 | 5.3 | 5.1 | 6.4 | 8.4^{†} | 7.9 | 7.9 |
| Drenthe | Netherlands | 6.2^{†} | 4.9 | 4.4 | 4.7 | 4.9 | 5.3 | 6.4 | 7.1^{†} | 7.3 | 7.5 |
| Overijssel | Netherlands | 5.2^{†} | 4.1 | 3.5 | 4.0 | 4.9 | 4.9 | 5.6 | 7.2^{†} | 7.3 | 6.9 |
| Gelderland | Netherlands | 4.0^{†} | 3.4 | 3.5 | 3.8 | 4.6 | 4.7 | 5.3 | 6.6^{†} | 6.9 | 6.3 |
| Flevoland | Netherlands | 6.5^{†} | 4.8 | 4.2 | 4.5 | 5.7 | 5.4 | 7.3 | 9.9^{†} | 11.0 | 7.9 |
| Utrecht (NUTS 2021) | Netherlands | 4.4^{†} | 3.7 | 2.8 | 3.9 | 4.2 | 4.2 | 5.2 | 6.4^{†} | 6.4 | 6.4 |
| North Holland | Netherlands | 5.0^{†} | 3.9 | 3.5 | 4.1 | 4.7 | 5.0 | 5.4 | 7.2^{†} | 6.9 | 6.2 |
| South Holland (NUTS 2021) | Netherlands | 5.4^{†} | 4.6 | 3.8 | 4.8 | 5.7 | 5.6 | 6.9 | 8.0^{†} | 8.4 | 7.8 |
| Zeeland | Netherlands | 4.0^{†} | 2.8 | 2.7 | 2.5 | 3.0 | 3.2 | 3.5 | 5.0^{†} | 5.4 | 5.3 |
| North Brabant | Netherlands | 4.3^{†} | 3.5 | 3.2 | 4.0 | 4.7 | 4.6 | 5.3 | 6.7^{†} | 7.0 | 6.5 |
| Limburg | Netherlands | 5.8^{†} | 5.5 | 4.6 | 5.6 | 5.6 | 4.8 | 5.4 | 7.4^{†} | 7.4 | 6.3 |
| Utrecht | Netherlands | —N/a | —N/a | —N/a | —N/a | —N/a | —N/a | —N/a | —N/a | —N/a | —N/a |
| South Holland | Netherlands | —N/a | —N/a | —N/a | —N/a | —N/a | —N/a | —N/a | —N/a | —N/a | —N/a |
| Burgenland | Austria | 5.4 | 4.1^{†‡} | 4.2^{‡} | 5.0 | 4.0^{‡} | 3.8^{‡} | 4.6 | 4.3 | 4.8 | 5.2 |
| Lower Austria | Austria | 4.5 | 4.0^{†} | 3.7 | 4.7 | 3.9 | 4.5 | 4.6 | 5.0 | 5.1 | 5.2 |
| Vienna | Austria | 9.7 | 9.3^{†} | 7.3 | 8.8 | 8.3 | 8.1 | 8.9 | 9.3 | 10.2 | 10.6 |
| Carinthia | Austria | 4.7 | 4.2^{†} | 3.6 | 4.6 | 4.3 | 4.3 | 5.0 | 5.5 | 6.0 | 6.1 |
| Styria | Austria | 4.3 | 4.1^{†} | 3.8 | 5.0 | 4.5 | 3.6 | 4.0 | 4.7 | 5.0 | 4.7 |
| Upper Austria | Austria | 3.6 | 3.5^{†} | 2.7 | 4.2 | 3.9 | 3.4 | 3.3 | 4.3 | 4.1 | 4.1 |
| Salzburg | Austria | 3.5 | 3.5^{†} | 2.8 | 3.6 | 3.2 | 2.9 | 2.9 | 3.2 | 3.5 | 3.5 |
| Tyrol | Austria | 3.2 | 3.0^{†} | 2.6 | 3.3 | 3.2 | 2.7 | 2.8 | 3.1 | 3.2 | 3.0 |
| Vorarlberg | Austria | 5.0 | 4.1^{†} | 4.2 | 5.6 | 4.6 | 4.1 | 4.0 | 3.6 | 3.4 | 3.5 |
| Lesser Poland | Poland | 12.6 | 8.5 | 6.2 | 7.9 | 9.1^{†} | 9.4 | 10.4 | 10.9 | 9.1 | 7.2 |
| Silesia | Poland | 14.2 | 8.1 | 6.6 | 6.8 | 9.2^{†} | 9.2 | 9.4 | 9.7 | 8.6 | 7.2 |
| Greater Poland | Poland | 12.7 | 8.3 | 6.1 | 7.5 | 8.8^{†} | 8.6 | 8.5 | 8.8 | 7.7 | 5.8 |
| West Pomerania | Poland | 17.2 | 11.5 | 9.5 | 10.4 | 12.4^{†} | 11.8 | 10.9 | 10.1 | 8.4 | 7.5 |
| Lubusz | Poland | 14.0 | 9.8 | 6.5 | 9.6 | 10.6^{†} | 9.5 | 9.0 | 9.7 | 8.3 | 6.4 |
| Lower Silesia | Poland | 17.3 | 12.7 | 9.1 | 10.1 | 11.4^{†} | 10.6 | 11.1 | 11.3 | 9.1 | 7.0 |
| Opole | Poland | 13.5 | 9.4 | 6.5 | 9.9 | 9.7^{†} | 9.3 | 9.5 | 9.4 | 7.8 | 6.5 |
| Kuyavian-Pomerania | Poland | 16.3 | 11.3 | 9.1 | 10.4 | 10.6^{†} | 11.0 | 11.9 | 12.4 | 10.7 | 7.9 |
| Warmian-Masuria | Poland | 16.0 | 10.5 | 7.4 | 8.5 | 9.7^{†} | 9.6 | 11.0 | 11.4 | 9.8 | 9.5 |
| Pomerania | Poland | 13.8 | 9.5 | 5.5 | 6.4 | 9.3^{†} | 8.5 | 9.6 | 10.1 | 8.6 | 6.6 |
| Łódź | Poland | 13.4 | 9.3 | 6.7 | 7.6 | 9.3^{†} | 9.3 | 11.1 | 11.1 | 8.9 | 7.7 |
| Świętokrzyskie | Poland | 15.6 | 12.1 | 8.8 | 10.9 | 12.1^{†} | 13.0 | 13.2 | 13.0 | 11.4 | 10.1 |
| Lublin | Poland | 12.8 | 9.5 | 8.9 | 9.7 | 9.9^{†} | 10.3 | 10.5 | 10.3 | 9.9 | 9.3 |
| Podkarpackie | Poland | 13.8 | 9.7 | 8.2 | 10.2 | 11.7^{†} | 12.5 | 13.3 | 14.4 | 14.0 | 11.6 |
| Podlaskie | Poland | 11.4 | 9.0 | 6.4 | 7.1 | 10.3^{†} | 9.3 | 9.3 | 9.9 | 9.2 | 7.0 |
| Warsaw capital region | Poland | —N/a | —N/a | —N/a | —N/a | —N/a | —N/a | —N/a | 6.0 | 5.8 | 4.9 |
| Masovian regional region | Poland | —N/a | —N/a | —N/a | —N/a | —N/a | —N/a | —N/a | 10.5 | 8.9 | 8.3 |
| Norte | Portugal | 9.0 | 9.5 | 8.7 | 11.1 | 12.8 | 13.3^{†} | 16.2 | 17.5 | 15.0 | 13.8 |
| Algarve | Portugal | 5.6 | 6.7 | 7.1 | 10.5 | 13.5 | 15.6^{†} | 17.9 | 17.1 | 14.6 | 12.6 |
| Centro (NUTS 2021) | Portugal | 5.7 | 5.7 | 5.6 | 7.1 | 7.9 | 10.4^{†} | 12.1 | 11.9 | 10.9 | 9.4 |
| Lisbon Metropolitan Area (NUTS 2021) | Portugal | 8.6 | 9.0 | 8.3 | 9.8 | 11.3 | 14.2^{†} | 17.7 | 18.6 | 15.0 | 13.1 |
| Alentejo (NUTS 2021) | Portugal | 9.2 | 8.4 | 9.0 | 10.6 | 11.5 | 12.7^{†} | 16.1 | 17.0 | 14.4 | 13.4 |
| Azores | Portugal | —N/a | 4.3 | 5.4 | 6.7 | 6.8 | 11.4^{†} | 15.1 | 16.8 | 16.1 | 12.5 |
| Madeira | Portugal | 5.4 | 6.8 | 6.0 | 7.5 | 7.4 | 13.6^{†} | 17.3 | 18.0 | 15.0 | 14.5 |
| Nord-Vest | Romania | 5.9 | 4.3 | 3.8 | 5.6 | 6.5^{†} | 5.1 | 4.6 | 4.1 | 3.8 | 4.6 |
| Centru | Romania | 9.0 | 8.5 | 8.5 | 10.7 | 10.3^{†} | 10.8 | 9.5 | 9.5 | 9.2 | 7.4 |
| Nord-Est | Romania | 5.9 | 5.0 | 4.5 | 6.0 | 5.5^{†} | 4.7 | 4.2 | 4.4 | 4.2 | 3.6 |
| Sud-Est | Romania | 9.0 | 8.5 | 7.2 | 7.5 | 8.2^{†} | 9.6 | 9.4 | 9.5 | 10.4 | 9.0 |
| Sud - Muntenia | Romania | 9.4 | 8.2 | 6.8 | 8.0 | 7.8^{†} | 10.0 | 9.5 | 9.5 | 9.0 | 10.3 |
| Bucharest - Ilfov | Romania | 4.8 | 4.1 | 3.4 | 4.0 | 4.7^{†} | 5.6 | 6.5 | 8.0 | 7.2 | 5.3 |
| Sud-Vest | Romania | 7.1 | 6.8 | 6.5 | 6.8 | 7.3^{†} | 6.6 | 6.1 | 7.0 | 6.5 | 10.1 |
| Vest | Romania | 6.4 | 5.6 | 5.7 | 6.0 | 6.0^{†} | 5.7 | 5.1 | 5.2 | 4.8 | 5.4 |
| Eastern Slovenia | Slovenia | —N/a | —N/a | —N/a | —N/a | 7.8 | 9.2 | 9.9 | 11.4 | 11.1 | 10.3 |
| Western Slovenia | Slovenia | —N/a | —N/a | —N/a | —N/a | 6.6 | 7.0 | 7.6 | 8.7 | 8.2 | 7.5 |
| Eastern Slovenia (NUTS 2010) | Slovenia | 7.1 | 5.7 | 5.3 | 6.8 | —N/a | —N/a | —N/a | —N/a | —N/a | —N/a |
| Western Slovenia (NUTS 2010) | Slovenia | 4.7 | 3.9 | 3.4 | 4.8 | —N/a | —N/a | —N/a | —N/a | —N/a | —N/a |
| Bratislava | Slovakia | 4.6 | 4.3 | 3.4 | 4.6 | 6.2 | 5.8^{†} | 5.7 | 6.4 | 6.0 | 5.7 |
| Western Slovakia | Slovakia | 9.8 | 7.8 | 6.4 | 9.9 | 12.7 | 10.7^{†} | 11.3 | 11.7 | 11.0 | 9.7 |
| Central Slovakia | Slovakia | 16.4 | 15.3 | 13.1 | 14.6 | 16.5 | 15.9^{†} | 16.2 | 16.8 | 16.0 | 12.8 |
| Eastern Slovakia | Slovakia | 19.1 | 14.9 | 13.2 | 15.9 | 18.5 | 18.7^{†} | 19.0 | 18.5 | 16.6 | 15.0 |
| Western Finland (Länsi-Suomi) | Finland | 7.8 | 6.5^{†} | 6.5^{†} | 9.0 | 9.0 | 8.3 | 8.2 | 8.5 | 8.7 | 9.8 |
| Helsinki-Uusimaa | Finland | 5.4 | 5.0^{†} | 4.8^{†} | 6.2 | 6.4 | 5.8 | 6.3 | 6.7 | 7.3 | 8.0 |
| Southern Finland (Etelä-Suomi) | Finland | 7.7 | 6.7^{†} | 6.2^{†} | 8.1 | 9.1 | 8.5 | 7.5 | 8.4 | 9.4 | 10.0 |
| Northern and Eastern Finland | Finland | 10.8 | 9.9^{†} | 8.7^{†} | 10.5 | 10.1 | 9.4 | 9.5 | 9.9 | 10.0 | 10.4 |
| Stockholm | Sweden | 6.1 | 5.6 | 5.2 | 6.8 | 7.2 | 6.6 | 6.8 | 6.9 | 7.1 | 7.0 |
| East Middle Sweden | Sweden | 7.3 | 6.7 | 6.9 | 9.3 | 9.7 | 8.4 | 8.6 | 8.8 | 8.3 | 7.9 |
| Småland and the islands | Sweden | 5.9 | 5.1 | 5.0 | 8.1 | 7.9 | 7.1 | 7.4 | 7.1 | 6.7 | 6.0 |
| South Sweden | Sweden | 8.2 | 7.1 | 7.4 | 8.7 | 8.8 | 9.2 | 9.4 | 9.9 | 10.0 | 9.5 |
| West Sweden | Sweden | 6.8 | 5.9 | 6.1 | 8.6 | 8.7 | 7.4 | 7.7 | 8.0 | 7.6 | 6.6 |
| North Middle Sweden | Sweden | 7.9 | 6.3 | 6.6 | 9.4 | 9.0 | 8.8 | 8.6 | 8.8 | 8.6 | 7.9 |
| Middle Norrland | Sweden | 7.3 | 6.3 | 7.1 | 8.9 | 10.3 | 8.8 | 8.4 | 7.2 | 7.4 | 7.1 |
| Upper Norrland | Sweden | 8.5 | 6.8 | 6.6 | 8.9 | 9.5 | 8.0 | 7.7 | 7.2 | 7.4 | 7.2 |
| Tees Valley and Durham | United Kingdom | 5.8 | 6.0^{†} | 7.8^{†} | 8.3 | 9.1 | 11.8 | 11.6 | 10.9 | 9.8 | 8.5 |
| Northumberland and Tyne and Wear | United Kingdom | 6.9 | 6.2^{†} | 7.2^{†} | 9.8 | 9.6 | 9.9 | 9.0 | 9.2 | 8.3 | 7.7 |
| Cumbria | United Kingdom | 4.3 | 3.3^{†‡} | 3.1^{†‡} | 6.4 | 6.6 | 7.1 | 6.3 | 5.1 | 5.0 | 4.3 |
| Greater Manchester | United Kingdom | 5.4 | 6.4^{†} | 7.6^{†} | 9.5 | 8.7 | 9.8 | 10.1 | 9.4 | 8.0 | 6.5 |
| Lancashire | United Kingdom | 4.9 | 5.6^{†} | 5.4^{†} | 7.2 | 5.9 | 6.8 | 7.8 | 7.2 | 6.6 | 4.6 |
| Cheshire | United Kingdom | 3.3 | 3.0^{†} | 5.0^{†} | 6.0 | 6.1 | 5.7 | 5.9 | 5.2 | 3.4 | 3.5 |
| Merseyside | United Kingdom | 6.4 | 7.6^{†} | 8.6^{†} | 9.6 | 10.5 | 10.0 | 9.7 | 8.9 | 7.4 | 5.9 |
| East Yorkshire and Northern Lincolnshire | United Kingdom | 6.0 | 6.1^{†} | 5.1^{†} | 9.4 | 9.4 | 8.9 | 9.7 | 8.4 | 8.0 | 6.4 |
| North Yorkshire | United Kingdom | 4.0 | 3.5^{†} | 2.8^{†} | 5.4 | 6.7 | 6.5 | 5.1 | 4.4 | 4.6 | 3.2 |
| South Yorkshire | United Kingdom | 7.0 | 6.2^{†} | 8.1^{†} | 9.6 | 9.5 | 10.6 | 10.4 | 10.5 | 8.9 | 7.4 |
| West Yorkshire | United Kingdom | 5.5 | 5.6^{†} | 6.4^{†} | 8.6 | 9.7 | 9.8 | 9.4 | 9.4 | 6.8 | 6.6 |
| Derbyshire and Nottinghamshire | United Kingdom | 5.5 | 5.8^{†} | 5.2^{†} | 7.2 | 8.8 | 8.8 | 8.3 | 7.2 | 6.1 | 4.8 |
| Leicestershire, Rutland and Northamptonshire | United Kingdom | 5.1 | 4.6^{†} | 6.0^{†} | 7.4 | 7.3 | 7.6 | 7.0 | 7.8 | 5.3 | 4.5 |
| Lincolnshire | United Kingdom | 4.7 | 5.4^{†} | 6.2^{†} | 6.3 | 4.9 | 6.6 | 8.6 | 6.4 | 4.7 | 4.5 |
| Herefordshire, Worcestershire and Warwickshire | United Kingdom | 3.8 | 3.9^{†} | 4.3^{†} | 6.4 | 6.3 | 6.1 | 5.0 | 5.1 | 4.4 | 3.2 |
| Shropshire and Staffordshire | United Kingdom | 4.2 | 5.3^{†} | 4.5^{†} | 7.2 | 7.8 | 7.9 | 6.7 | 6.2 | 5.3 | 4.7 |
| West Midlands | United Kingdom | 7.9 | 8.1^{†} | 9.3^{†} | 13.0 | 11.1 | 11.3 | 11.7 | 13.0 | 9.7 | 7.9 |
| East Anglia | United Kingdom | 4.7 | 4.4^{†} | 4.5^{†} | 5.9 | 6.6 | 6.3 | 6.4 | 6.2 | 5.0 | 4.3 |
| Bedfordshire and Hertfordshire | United Kingdom | 4.8 | 4.7^{†} | 4.8^{†} | 5.9 | 6.0 | 6.8 | 6.4 | 5.6 | 4.3 | 3.8 |
| Essex | United Kingdom | 4.7 | 5.0^{†} | 5.1^{†} | 6.9 | 7.0 | 6.9 | 7.4 | 6.4 | 6.2 | 4.3 |
| Inner London - West | United Kingdom | —N/a | —N/a | —N/a | —N/a | 8.1 | 7.7 | 6.9 | 6.8 | 6.3 | 5.4 |
| Inner London - East | United Kingdom | —N/a | —N/a | —N/a | —N/a | 10.9 | 12.0 | 10.7 | 9.8 | 7.9 | 7.2 |
| Outer London - East and North East | United Kingdom | —N/a | —N/a | —N/a | —N/a | 10.0 | 11.1 | 9.5 | 9.5 | 7.5 | 7.5 |
| Outer London - South | United Kingdom | —N/a | —N/a | —N/a | —N/a | 7.1 | 8.2 | 7.3 | 7.4 | 5.9 | 4.6 |
| Outer London - West and North West | United Kingdom | —N/a | —N/a | —N/a | —N/a | 8.6 | 8.5 | 9.3 | 8.4 | 6.2 | 5.5 |
| Berkshire, Buckinghamshire and Oxfordshire | United Kingdom | 3.9 | 4.0^{†} | 4.1^{†} | 5.4 | 5.9 | 5.2 | 5.7 | 5.2 | 4.2 | 3.5 |
| Surrey, East Sussex and West Sussex | United Kingdom | 4.0 | 4.0^{†} | 4.4^{†} | 5.6 | 5.2 | 5.3 | 5.9 | 5.5 | 4.7 | 3.7 |
| Hampshire and Isle of Wight | United Kingdom | 4.6 | 4.3^{†} | 3.6^{†} | 5.3 | 6.3 | 6.0 | 6.3 | 5.7 | 4.2 | 4.1 |
| Kent | United Kingdom | 5.5 | 5.6^{†} | 5.3^{†} | 7.3 | 7.7 | 8.3 | 8.0 | 7.6 | 5.7 | 5.3 |
| Gloucestershire, Wiltshire and Bristol | United Kingdom | 3.3 | 3.4^{†} | 3.7^{†} | 5.7 | 5.4 | 6.5 | 6.1 | 6.2 | 4.8 | 3.9 |
| Dorset and Somerset | United Kingdom | 3.7 | 3.7^{†} | 4.1^{†} | 6.5 | 5.5 | 6.1 | 5.1 | 5.5 | 4.5 | 4.0 |
| Cornwall and Isles of Scilly | United Kingdom | 3.9^{‡} | 4.5^{†} | 5.8^{†} | 5.2 | 8.2 | 6.2 | 5.5 | 5.6 | 3.9 | 4.5 |
| Devon | United Kingdom | 4.4 | 4.7^{†} | 3.8^{†} | 7.1 | 6.5 | 6.6 | 5.9 | 7.0 | 5.1 | 3.7 |
| West Wales and the Valleys | United Kingdom | 5.4 | 5.5^{†} | 6.1^{†} | 8.9 | 9.2 | 10.0 | 9.2 | 7.8 | 6.9 | 6.5 |
| East Wales | United Kingdom | 4.9 | 4.8^{†} | 5.6^{†} | 6.7 | 7.8 | 6.5 | 7.6 | 7.4 | 6.1 | 4.8 |
| Eastern Scotland | United Kingdom | —N/a | —N/a | —N/a | —N/a | —N/a | —N/a | —N/a | 7.5 | 5.8 | 6.0 |
| West Central Scotland | United Kingdom | —N/a | —N/a | —N/a | —N/a | —N/a | —N/a | —N/a | 8.1 | 7.8 | 7.1 |
| Southern Scotland | United Kingdom | —N/a | —N/a | —N/a | —N/a | —N/a | —N/a | —N/a | 7.9 | 5.3 | 6.1 |
| Scottish Highlands and islands | United Kingdom | 3.2^{‡} | 2.2^{†‡} | 2.0^{†‡} | 4.3 | 7.0 | 6.9 | 8.1 | 4.4 | 3.9^{‡} | 2.8^{‡} |
| Northern Ireland | United Kingdom | 4.4 | 3.9^{†} | 4.4^{†} | 6.4 | 7.1 | 7.2 | 7.4 | 7.5 | 6.4 | 6.1 |
| Iceland | Iceland | 2.8 | 2.3 | 2.9 | 7.2 | 7.6 | 7.0 | 6.0 | 5.4 | 4.9 | 4.0 |
| Oslo and Akershus (statistical region 2016) | Norway | 3.5^{†} | 2.5 | 2.9 | 3.6 | 4.0 | 3.4 | 3.2 | 3.9 | 3.8 | 4.7 |
| Innlandet | Norway | 3.1^{†} | 2.2 | 2.4 | 2.5 | 3.2 | 2.9 | 3.0 | 2.9 | 2.9 | 4.5 |
| Sør-Østlandet (statistical region 2016) | Norway | 4.0^{†} | 2.9 | 2.7 | 3.4 | 3.7 | 3.6 | 3.5 | 3.9 | 4.1 | 4.5 |
| Rogaland, Vest-Agder & Aust-Agder (statistical region 2016) | Norway | 2.9^{†} | 1.9 | 1.8 | 2.2 | 2.6 | 2.2 | 2.7 | 3.2 | 3.1 | 4.6 |
| Vestlandet (statistical region 2016) | Norway | 2.8^{†} | 2.3 | 2.1 | 2.4 | 3.4 | 3.1 | 2.9 | 3.1 | 3.0 | 3.9 |
| Trøndelag | Norway | 3.6^{†} | 3.1 | 3.3 | 3.7 | 3.6 | 3.5 | 3.3 | 2.6 | 3.8 | 3.7 |
| Nord-Norge | Norway | 3.8^{†} | 2.7 | 2.9 | 3.7 | 3.8 | 3.5 | 3.3 | 3.2 | 3.3 | 3.4 |
| Lake Geneva | Switzerland | 5.2 | 4.8 | 4.6 | 5.9 | 7.2^{†} | 7.1 | 7.1 | 7.4 | 7.5 | 7.5 |
| Espace Mittelland | Switzerland | 3.8 | 4.1 | 3.3 | 3.7 | 4.6^{†} | 3.8 | 3.9 | 4.2 | 4.5 | 4.4 |
| Northwestern Switzerland | Switzerland | 4.1 | 3.1 | 3.1 | 4.5 | 4.7^{†} | 4.3 | 4.5 | 4.4 | 4.6 | 4.3 |
| Zürich | Switzerland | 3.8 | 3.5 | 3.2 | 3.8 | 4.4^{†} | 4.0 | 3.8 | 4.4 | 4.1 | 4.1 |
| Eastern Switzerland | Switzerland | 3.7 | 2.7 | 2.7 | 3.4 | 3.8^{†} | 3.6 | 3.5 | 3.9 | 3.5 | 4.0 |
| Central Switzerland | Switzerland | 2.7 | 2.7 | 2.3 | 2.7 | 3.2^{†} | 2.6 | 2.9 | 2.9 | 3.7 | 3.4 |
| Ticino | Switzerland | 5.3 | 5.0 | 5.0 | 5.1 | 5.9^{†} | 6.0 | 7.5 | 7.8 | 7.2 | 6.9 |
| Montenegro | Montenegro | —N/a | —N/a | —N/a | —N/a | —N/a | 19.7 | 20.0 | 19.5 | 18.0 | 17.6 |
| North Macedonia | North Macedonia | 36.1 | 35.0 | 33.8 | 32.2 | 32.0 | 31.4 | 31.0 | 29.0 | 28.0 | 26.1 |
| Belgrade | Serbia | —N/a | —N/a | —N/a | —N/a | —N/a | —N/a | —N/a | 17.9 | 17.2^{†} | 18.7 |
| Vojvodina | Serbia | —N/a | —N/a | —N/a | —N/a | —N/a | —N/a | —N/a | 24.0 | 19.9^{†} | 16.7 |
| Šumadija and Western Serbia | Serbia | —N/a | —N/a | —N/a | —N/a | —N/a | —N/a | —N/a | 22.8 | 18.4^{†} | 17.1 |
| Southern and Eastern Serbia | Serbia | —N/a | —N/a | —N/a | —N/a | —N/a | —N/a | —N/a | 24.4 | 22.4^{†} | 18.9 |
| Istanbul | Turkey | 10.5 | 9.4 | 10.0 | 15.9 | 13.5 | 11.1 | 10.7 | 10.6 | 11.9^{†} | 12.8 |
| Tekirdağ, Edirne and Kırklareli | Turkey | 6.9 | 6.5 | 9.9 | 11.7 | 8.5 | 8.1 | 6.2 | 6.4 | 7.6^{†} | 7.3 |
| Balıkesir and Çanakkale | Turkey | 4.9 | 4.6 | 6.2 | 7.1 | 6.1 | 4.3 | 4.5 | 5.6 | 5.6^{†} | 5.4 |
| İzmir | Turkey | 10.3 | 9.4 | 11.0 | 15.4 | 14.2 | 13.8 | 13.3 | 14.3 | 13.8^{†} | 14.9 |
| Aydın, Denizli and Muğla | Turkey | 5.3 | 8.2 | 9.6 | 12.9 | 10.3 | 7.5 | 6.6 | 6.0 | 7.2^{†} | 6.9 |
| Manisa, Afyonkarahisar and Kütahya, Uşak | Turkey | 6.2 | 5.6 | 7.0 | 9.6 | 6.8 | 4.5 | 4.1 | 5.2 | 4.0^{†} | 4.1 |
| Bursa, Eskişehir and Bilecik | Turkey | 7.3 | 7.4 | 9.7 | 12.7 | 9.2 | 6.7 | 6.4 | 6.0 | 6.2^{†} | 7.7 |
| Kocaeli, Sakarya, Düzce and Bolu, Yalova | Turkey | 10.3 | 10.2 | 9.7 | 12.9 | 11.1 | 10.7 | 8.9 | 9.1 | 9.9^{†} | 10.2 |
| Ankara | Turkey | 11.4 | 10.5 | 10.8 | 12.3 | 10.7 | 8.5 | 8.3 | 9.0 | 11.5^{†} | 11.1 |
| Konya and Karaman | Turkey | 9.3 | 9.0 | 9.2 | 8.9 | 7.1 | 5.6 | 5.0 | 3.8 | 5.6^{†} | 6.5 |
| Antalya, Isparta, Burdur | Turkey | 6.4 | 6.2 | 8.5 | 10.1 | 9.8 | 8.7 | 7.4 | 7.2 | 8.4^{†} | 9.5 |
| Adana and Mersin | Turkey | 14.3 | 13.0 | 14.5 | 20.0 | 14.9 | 9.3 | 9.1 | 11.3 | 10.7^{†} | 9.8 |
| Hatay, Kahramanmaraş and Osmaniye | Turkey | 9.5 | 9.8 | 14.1 | 14.9 | 11.7 | 10.5 | 9.1 | 10.9 | 15.4^{†} | 16.3 |
| Kırıkkale, Aksaray, Niğde and Nevşehir, Kırşehir | Turkey | 9.2 | 7.1 | 8.2 | 14.3 | 9.0 | 7.0 | 6.2 | 5.6 | 7.6^{†} | 10.0 |
| Kayseri, Sivas and Yozgat | Turkey | 9.6 | 10.0 | 10.2 | 11.3 | 12.3 | 9.8 | 7.4 | 8.5 | 9.6^{†} | 9.7 |
| Zonguldak, Karabük and Bartın | Turkey | 4.9 | 7.1 | 6.0 | 6.7 | 10.3 | 6.9 | 6.6 | 6.3 | 6.0^{†} | 6.9 |
| Kastamonu, Çankırı and Sinop | Turkey | 3.9 | 3.2 | 5.0 | 8.5 | 7.6 | 5.4 | 4.6 | 5.7 | 6.6^{†} | 6.9 |
| Samsun, Tokat, Çorum and Amasya | Turkey | 5.8 | 7.2 | 6.3 | 6.1 | 6.1 | 4.7 | 5.0 | 5.6 | 6.2^{†} | 6.6 |
| Trabzon, Ordu, Giresun and Rize, Artvin and Gümüşhane | Turkey | 4.3 | 4.9 | 4.4 | 4.3 | 4.9 | 5.4 | 5.3 | 6.1 | 6.3^{†} | 4.9 |
| Erzurum, Erzincan and Bayburt | Turkey | 3.9 | 4.3 | 5.3 | 6.4 | 5.5 | 5.6 | 5.6 | 6.2 | 7.4^{†} | 6.0 |
| Ağrı, Kars, Iğdır and Ardahan | Turkey | 3.4 | 4.4 | 4.8 | 7.6 | 8.7 | 9.2 | 6.3 | 5.7 | 3.4^{†} | 3.9 |
| Malatya, Elazığ, Bingöl and Tunceli | Turkey | 10.6 | 10.7 | 12.4 | 14.9 | 10.6 | 7.9 | 5.9 | 5.7 | 7.6^{†} | 7.9 |
| Van, Muş, Bitlis and Hakkâri | Turkey | 6.9 | 11.5 | 12.7 | 14.6 | 15.5 | 11.0 | 7.5 | 9.2 | 13.5^{†} | 9.7 |
| Gaziantep, Adıyaman and Kilis | Turkey | 12.7 | 16.9 | 15.0 | 14.3 | 11.4 | 13.2 | 10.6 | 6.2 | 8.1^{†} | 9.7 |
| Şanlıurfa and Diyarbakır | Turkey | 10.8 | 13.0 | 12.8 | 16.7 | 11.2 | 6.9 | 6.0 | 16.0 | 17.5^{†} | 17.4 |
| Mardin, Batman, Şırnak and Siirt | Turkey | 13.5 | 18.0 | 15.8 | 13.8 | 10.4 | 10.3 | 18.8 | 19.4 | 24.1^{†} | 24.4 |
