= West Wales and the Valleys =

Former statistical region of Wales

The region consisted of the green principal areas of Wales on this map, with East Wales in shades of brown.

West Wales and the Valleys was a UK International Territorial Level 2 statistical region covering the western areas of Wales and the South Wales Valleys. Created as part of Eurostat's Nomenclature of Territorial Units for Statistics (NUTS), it was used by the European Union (EU) to deliver the European Regional Development Fund to areas of Wales, until the UK's withdrawal from the EU in 2020, after which it was mirrored onto the Office for National Statistics' International Territorial Level (ITL) geo-classification system. The remainder of Wales was part of the East Wales statistical region. It was replaced in 2025, by three alternative regions of Wales.

== Description ==
The statistical region covered all of western Wales from Denbighshire in the north, to the South Wales Valleys and covering Bridgend, Swansea, Neath Port Talbot, as well as the Isle of Anglesey off the north-west coast of Wales. It covers an area of 1,240,000 hectares (12,400 km^{2}), with a coastline of 1,150 kilometres (710 mi). In September 2010, it had around 1.28 million people, 64% of the population of Wales, although 60% of the statistical region's population resided in the South Wales Valleys. The region was greatly impacted by the loss of its mining and heavy industry.

The 15 principal areas of Wales that were part of the region are: Blaenau Gwent, Bridgend, Caerphilly, Carmarthenshire, Ceredigion, Conwy, Denbighshire, Gwynedd, Isle of Anglesey, Merthyr Tydfil, Neath Port Talbot, Pembrokeshire, Rhondda Cynon Taf, Swansea and Torfaen.

The region was used to manage European Union (EU) funding to this part of the United Kingdom, with the funding applied in seven-year periods. Between 2014 and 2020, €1.2 billion was allocated to the regions classified as 'less developed' by the EU, having a GDP per capita lower than 75% of the EU average. In 2016, the region had been awarded the highest level of structural (convergence) funding in the UK for a third time, compared to the two occasions on which Cornwall, Liverpool and Scotland's Highlands and Islands have received the highest level too. The funding is aimed at countries which have a gross value added (GVA) that is less than three quarters of the EU average. The region was awarded the highest level again, because while the region's GVA has increased, it had not increased as much as the EU average did. The region was also specifically awarded "special financial assistance" by the EU, alongside South West England.

Following the UK's withdrawal from the European Union (Brexit), disputes over continued funding for the region were raised. The Welsh Government argued that it is not receiving the same levels of funding from the UK Government as the EU had provided, while the UK Government states it is fully replacing the EU funds for the regions. The UK Government, however, awards the funds under a more competitive bidding system, compared to the EU which set overall objectives but let priorities be decided locally. Also, as a result of Brexit, Eurostat's Nomenclature of Territorial Units for Statistics (NUTS), was replaced by the UK Office for National Statistics' International Territorial Level (ITL), a similar geoclassification system that is currently a mirror of the pre-existing NUTS regions.

West Wales and the Valleys was an ITL 2 area, comprising eight ITL 3 areas, which were either individuals or groupings of the principal areas of Wales. The ITL 3 areas were:

- Bridgend and Neath Port Talbot (17)
- Conwy and Denbighshire (13)
- Central Valleys (15)
- Gwent Valleys (16)
- Gwynedd (12)
- Isle of Anglesey (11)
- South West Wales (corresponding to former Dyfed) (14)
- Swansea (18)

The numbers in parentheses afterwards reference those used on the map at the top of this article.

== See also ==
- West Wales
