= East Wales =

Region of Wales

Coordinates: 52.413°N 3.192°W

The former East Wales NUTS 2 statistical region comprising the various NUTS 3 regions in shades of yellow brown. It was discontinued in 2025.

East Wales (Welsh: Dwyrain Cymru) is a loosely-defined region of Wales covering its eastern parts, and a former International Territorial Level (previously NUTS) statistical region of Wales.

Various organisations in Wales use various methodologies to sub-divide territory, and most of them use a North–South divide. The East-West divide was generally used by the Office for National Statistics (ONS), and sporting organisations such as the Welsh Athletics. Since 2025, the ONS no longer uses an East Wales region, but has used a three-region North, Mid and South West, and South East divide for its 2025 set of ITL 2 regions instead.

== Usage ==
Various organisations in Wales use various methodologies to sub-divide Welsh territory. The most common form of division of Wales into various regions has been using cardinal and intercardinal references, and most of them including the Welsh Government, and organisations such as Visit Wales, Natural Resources Wales, use a North–South divide. The East–West divide is used on rare occasions and was generally used by the Office for National Statistics, as part of Eurostat's Nomenclature of Territorial Units for Statistics (NUTS), with an East Wales and a West Wales and the Valleys regions of Wales. The Welsh Government used this East-West NUTS divide when utilising European Union funding, such as in case of economic planning and development.

== Geography ==
East Wales statistical region generally encompassed the easternmost parts of the country, spread over an area of 8,000 km^{2} (3,100 sq mi). It was further sub-divided into seven unitary authority areas – Monmouthshire, Newport, Cardiff, Vale of Glamorgan, Flintshire, Wrexham, and Powys. The region consisted of mountainous terrain on the Eastern extremes with urban developments in the valley region between Cardiff and Newport. The valley extended north into the mountainous regions bordering Powys. The former region hosts a variety of wildlife, and incorporated parts of the Brecon Beacons National Park.

== Demographics ==
The region was home to a population of approximately 1.1 million people in 2002. The former region is considered more economically developed, than the corresponding western part of the territory. The more urban parts consisted of well educated and skilled manpower, with a high net income compared to the other region of Wales. However, the rural regions were sparsely populated, and predominantly dependent on agriculture. They had low income levels compared to the urban areas, and were faced with farming on difficult terrain.

== National statistics ==
The Office for National Statistics divided the geographical area of the UK into various levels of sub-divisions. Entire Wales is demarcated as an International Territorial Level One (ITL 1) statistical region. Within Wales, various geographical sub-divisions were designated as ITL 2 statistical regions. The East Wales region was one of the two sub-divisions, with the remainder of Wales termed as West Wales and the Valleys. It was further divided into four ITL 3 regions. The ONS replaced the East–West regions with a North, Mid and southwest, and Southeast divide in 2025.

Former ITL regions until 2025
ITL 1	Code	ITL 2	Code	ITL 3	Code
Wales	TLL	East Wales	TLL2	Monmouthshire and Newport	TLL21
		East Wales	TLL2	Cardiff and Vale of Glamorgan	TLL22
		East Wales	TLL2	Flintshire and Wrexham	TLL23
		East Wales	TLL2	Powys	TLL24

== Sport ==
Welsh Athletics divides the Wales region into four sub-regions based on the cardinal directions. The leagues for various disciplines having regional and inter-region competitions, are conducted based on the same. The East Wales region covers Blaenau Gwent, Caerphilly (eastern half), Monmouthshire, Newport, South Powys and Torfaen.

Sports associations such as Wales Bridge Association use a similar methodology with the East Wales Bridge Association one amongst the four in Wales, the others being Mid, West and North. The East Wales Association consists of the historic counties of Glamorgan, Monmouthshire and Brecknockshire.

== See also ==
- Geography of Wales
- List of Welsh principal areas by percentage Welsh language
- Subdivisions of Wales
  - Mid Wales
  - North Wales
  - South Wales
  - West Wales
- Welsh Marches
