= List of European Union regions by GDP =

This is a list of European Union regions (NUTS2 regions) sorted by their gross domestic product (GDP). Eurostat calculates the GDP based on the information provided by national statistics institutes affiliated to Eurostat.

The list presents statistics for 2024 from Eurostat, as of 10 February 2026. The figures are in millions of nominal euros, purchasing power standards and purchasing power standard per capita.

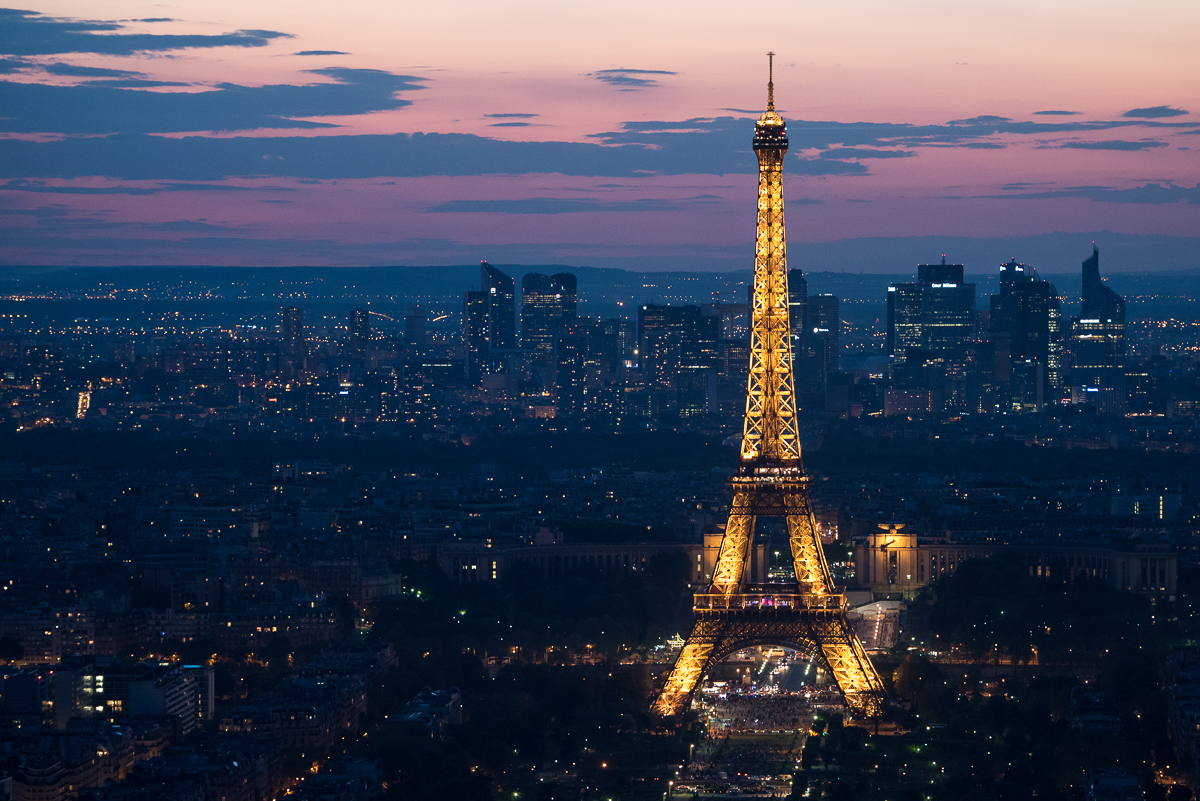
Île-de-France region has the largest GDP in the EU (US$1.0 trillion).

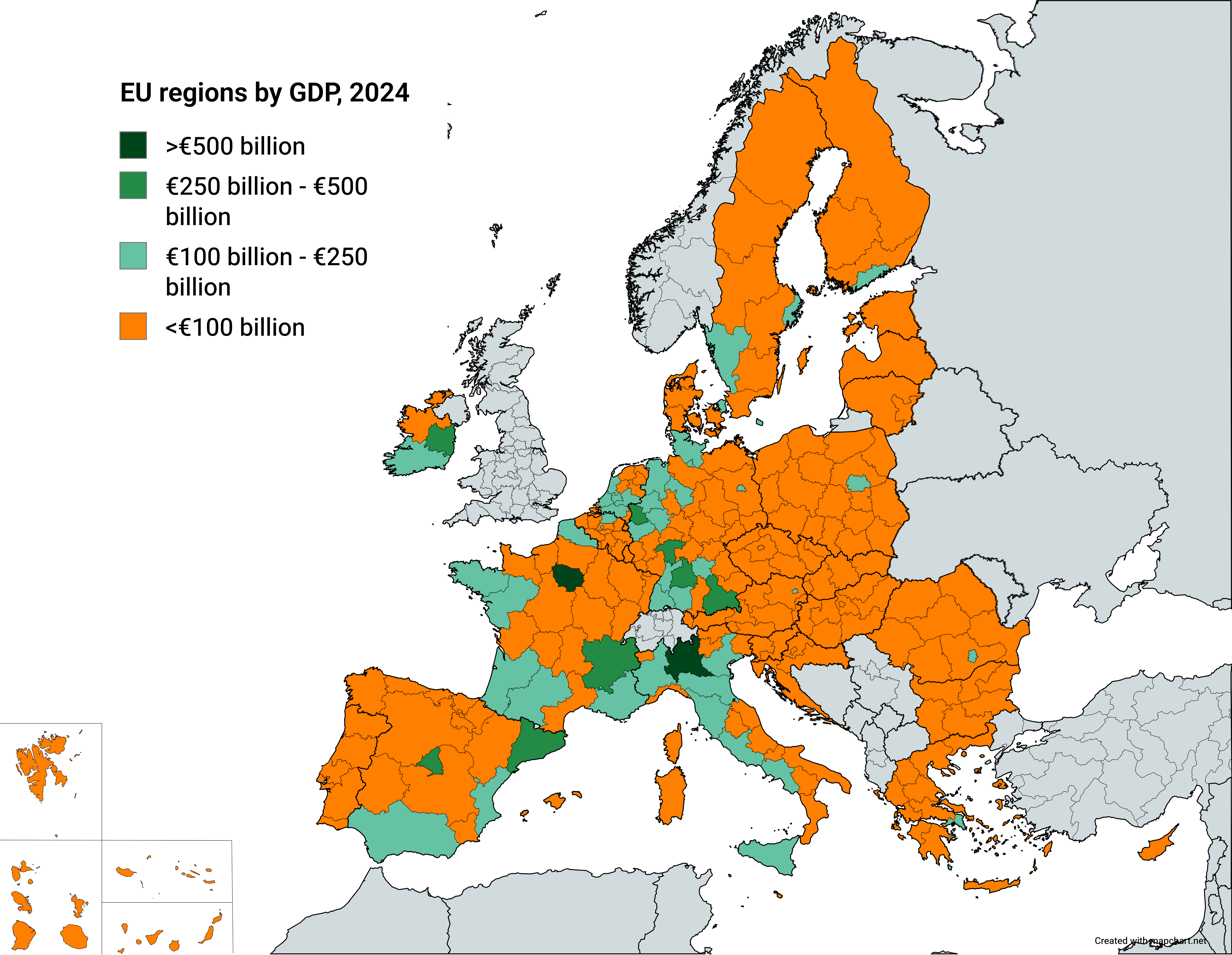
EU NUTS-2 regions by GDP, 2024

== 2024 list ==
List of European Union regions and territories by GDP in 2024
Region (NUTS2)	Country	Nominal GDP million EUR (2024)	GDP in Purchasing Power Standard			Population in millions (2025)
Region (NUTS2)	Country	Nominal GDP million EUR (2024)	million EUR (2024)	per capita in EUR (2024)	per capita as % of EU average (2024)	Population in millions (2025)
Burgenland	Austria	11,762	10,384	34,400	86	0.301
Lower Austria	Austria	76,878	67,871	39,300	98	1.727
Vienna	Austria	124,868	110,239	54,600	137	2.028
Carinthia	Austria	28,270	24,958	43,800	110	0.570
Styria	Austria	63,924	56,435	44,400	111	1.271
Upper Austria	Austria	82,538	72,868	47,500	119	1.535
Salzburg	Austria	37,663	33,250	58,100	146	0.572
Tyrol	Austria	44,805	39,556	50,900	128	0.777
Vorarlberg	Austria	23,214	20,494	49,900	125	0.411
Brussels	Belgium	108,153	96,318	76,000	190	1.271
Antwerp	Belgium	117,767	104,880	54,100	135	1.947
Limburg (Belgium)	Belgium	38,231	34,047	37,500	94	0.909
East Flanders	Belgium	78,272	69,707	44,100	110	1.586
Flemish Brabant	Belgium	68,662	61,149	50,900	127	1.205
West Flanders	Belgium	64,564	57,499	46,700	117	1.234
Walloon Brabant	Belgium	28,893	25,732	61,900	155	0.416
Hainaut	Belgium	44,184	39,349	28,800	72	1.369
Liège	Belgium	43,415	38,664	34,200	86	1.131
Luxembourg (Belgium)	Belgium	9,719	8,656	28,900	72	0.299
Namur	Belgium	18,216	16,222	31,900	80	0.509
North West	Bulgaria	6,795	10,997	16,700	42	0.655
North Central	Bulgaria	7,226	11,695	17,300	43	0.673
North East	Bulgaria	10,324	16,709	20,200	51	0.826
South East	Bulgaria	13,272	21,481	22,600	57	0.953
South West	Bulgaria	53,168	86,051	42,600	107	2.022
South Central	Bulgaria	13,983	22,632	17,300	43	1.306
Pannonian Croatia	Croatia	14,810	20,715	21,100	53	0.982
Adriatic Croatia	Croatia	27,579	38,576	29,200	73	1.322
Zagreb	Croatia	29,117	40,727	52,500	131	0.777
Northern Croatia	Croatia	14,400	20,142	25,500	64	0.792
Cyprus	Cyprus	34,770	38,457	39,500	99	0.982
Prague	Czech Republic	86,596	106,400	76,600	192	1.397
Central Bohemia	Czech Republic	39,719	48,803	33,400	84	1.466
Southwest	Czech Republic	31,039	38,137	30,100	75	1.267
Northwest	Czech Republic	21,909	26,920	24,400	61	1.101
Northeast	Czech Republic	37,391	45,942	29,900	75	1.535
Southeast	Czech Republic	47,587	58,470	33,500	84	1.746
Central Moravia	Czech Republic	29,147	35,813	29,600	74	1.210
Moravian-Silesian	Czech Republic	27,398	33,664	28,400	71	1.182
Capital Region of Denmark	Denmark	174,136	134,652	70,100	175	1.930
Zealand	Denmark	39,701	30,699	36,000	90	0.854
Southern Denmark	Denmark	68,822	53,217	42,900	107	1.240
Central Jutland	Denmark	76,569	59,208	43,200	108	1.373
North Jutland	Denmark	30,552	23,625	39,800	100	0.592
Estonia	Estonia	39,848	43,379	31,600	79	1.369
West Finland	Finland	62,179	51,728	37,000	93	1.399
Helsinki-Uusimaa	Finland	108,496	90,260	51,000	128	1.782
South Finland	Finland	49,395	41,093	35,700	89	1.151
North & East Finland	Finland	54,142	45,042	35,400	89	1.272
Åland	Finland	1,633	1,359	44,400	111	0.030
Île-de-France	France	865,652	797,013	64,000	160	12.549
Centre-Val de Loire	France	91,467	84,215	32,600	82	2.588
Burgundy	France	58,023	53,422	33,000	83	1.621
Franche-Comté	France	37,752	34,758	29,400	74	1.175
Lower Normandy	France	51,149	47,093	31,900	80	1.486
Upper Normandy	France	66,564	61,286	33,000	83	1.864
Nord-Pas-de-Calais	France	136,523	125,698	30,800	77	4.065
Picardy	France	60,808	55,987	29,200	73	1.908
Alsace	France	75,304	69,333	35,700	89	1.941
Champagne-Ardenne	France	49,671	45,732	34,800	87	1.296
Lorraine	France	72,857	67,080	28,800	72	2.312
Pays de la Loire	France	147,791	136,072	34,600	87	3.945
Brittany	France	126,549	116,515	33,700	84	3.489
Aquitaine	France	135,735	124,972	34,700	87	3.635
Limousin	France	23,258	21,414	29,500	74	0.729
Poitou-Charentes	France	64,440	59,331	32,200	81	1.846
Languedoc-Roussillon	France	98,094	90,316	30,400	76	2.997
Midi-Pyrénées	France	123,658	113,853	35,600	89	3.208
Auvergne	France	47,249	43,502	31,700	79	1.368
Rhône-Alpes	France	299,156	275,436	40,000	100	6.901
Provence-Alpes-Côte d'Azur	France	217,942	200,661	38,500	96	5.285
Corsica	France	13,358	12,299	34,500	86	0.362
Guadeloupe	France	11,878	10,936	26,800	67	0.413
Martinique	France	10,480	9,649	27,500	69	0.359
French Guiana	France	5,244	4,828	16,300	41	0.297
Réunion	France	24,457	22,518	25,400	63	0.904
Mayotte	France	3,786	3,486	12,000	30	0.329
Stuttgart (district)	Germany	285,396	255,408	61,300	153	4.167
Karlsruhe (district)	Germany	157,762	141,185	49,600	124	2.848
(Baden-Württemberg) Freiburg (district)	Germany	108,785	97,354	41,900	105	2.325
Tubingen (district)	Germany	103,529	92,651	48,700	122	1.904
Upper Bavaria	Germany	359,141	321,405	67,700	170	4.764
Lower Bavaria	Germany	63,132	56,499	45,000	113	1.259
Upper Palatinate	Germany	61,170	54,742	48,900	122	1.121
Upper Franconia	Germany	51,407	46,005	43,600	109	1.055
Middle Franconia	Germany	101,079	90,458	50,400	126	1.795
Lower Franconia	Germany	67,892	60,759	46,100	115	1.318
Swabia	Germany	93,507	83,682	43,400	109	1.933
Berlin	Germany	207,852	186,012	50,600	127	3.685
Brandenburg	Germany	97,830	87,550	34,300	86	2.556
(Bremen (state)) Bremen	Germany	41,424	37,071	52,700	132	0.704
Hamburg	Germany	162,581	145,498	78,300	196	1.862
Darmstadt (district)	Germany	266,733	238,707	59,200	148	4.039
Gießen (district)	Germany	46,317	41,450	39,800	100	1.040
Kassel (district)	Germany	57,802	51,729	43,100	108	1.200
Mecklenburg-Vorpommern	Germany	61,593	55,121	35,000	88	1.573
(Lower Saxony) Braunschweig (district)	Germany	91,587	81,964	51,500	129	1.589
Hanover (district)	Germany	106,077	94,931	44,700	112	2.123
Lüneburg (district)	Germany	64,918	58,097	33,700	84	1.721
(Lower Saxony) Weser-Ems	Germany	120,883	108,181	42,100	105	2.569
(North Rhine-Westphalia) Düsseldorf (district)	Germany	271,328	242,818	46,300	116	5.244
(North Rhine-Westphalia) Cologne (district)	Germany	236,726	211,853	47,300	118	4.486
Münster (district)	Germany	112,830	100,974	38,000	95	2.659
(North Rhine-Westphalia) Detmold (district)	Germany	98,053	87,750	42,300	106	2.072
(North Rhine-Westphalia) Arnsberg (district)	Germany	156,494	140,051	39,200	98	3.571
Koblenz (district)	Germany	65,059	58,223	38,100	95	1.530
Trier (district)	Germany	20,653	18,483	35,100	88	0.525
(Rhineland-Palatinate) Rheinhessen-Pfalz	Germany	99,170	88,750	42,800	107	2.073
Saarland	Germany	42,757	38,264	37,800	95	1.012
(Saxony) Dresden	Germany	64,937	58,114	36,600	92	1.584
(Saxony) Chemnitz	Germany	50,776	45,441	32,700	82	1.386
(Saxony) Leipzig	Germany	46,501	41,615	38,900	97	1.071
Saxony-Anhalt	Germany	79,577	71,216	33,300	83	2.135
Schleswig-Holstein	Germany	127,512	114,114	38,600	97	2.959
Thuringia	Germany	78,201	69,984	33,200	83	2.100
Attica	Greece	115,495	140,639	38,200	96	3.764
North Aegean	Greece	3,121	3,801	16,800	42	0.207
South Aegean	Greece	7,857	9,567	27,900	70	0.327
Crete	Greece	12,276	14,949	23,800	60	0.621
Eastern Macedonia and Thrace	Greece	8,588	10,457	17,800	45	0.565
Central Macedonia	Greece	32,902	40,065	21,900	55	1.772
Western Macedonia	Greece	4,073	4,959	19,200	48	0.243
Epirus	Greece	4,770	5,808	17,800	45	0.324
Thessaly	Greece	12,079	14,709	21,000	53	0.676
Ionian Islands	Greece	4,151	5,054	25,300	63	0.198
Western Greece	Greece	10,223	12,448	19,500	49	0.635
Central Greece	Greece	10,718	13,052	23,900	60	0.507
Peloponnese	Greece	10,483	12,765	22,700	57	0.529
Budapest	Hungary	80,201	113,254	67,200	168	1.685
Pest	Hungary	24,190	34,160	25,600	64	1.336
Central Transdanubia	Hungary	19,575	27,643	26,200	66	1.051
Western Transdanubia	Hungary	18,317	25,866	26,400	66	0.974
Southern Transdanubia	Hungary	12,024	16,980	20,000	50	0.845
Northern Hungary	Hungary	14,412	20,351	18,900	47	1.072
Northern Great Plain	Hungary	19,685	27,798	19,900	50	1.390
Southern Great Plain	Hungary	17,636	24,904	21,000	52	1.183
Northern and Western	Ireland	44,933	38,039	40,000	100	0.958
Southern	Ireland	182,323	154,350	86,500	217	1.805
Eastern and Midland	Ireland	335,539	284,059	107,200	268	2.675
Piemonte	Italy	164,165	171,720	40,400	101	4.251
Aosta Valley	Italy	5,852	6,121	49,900	125	0.122
Liguria	Italy	58,959	61,672	40,900	102	1.510
Lombardy	Italy	504,730	527,957	52,700	132	10.033
Abruzzo	Italy	40,761	42,636	33,600	84	1.269
Molise	Italy	7,987	8,354	29,000	72	0.287
Campania	Italy	137,511	143,839	25,700	64	5.582
Puglia	Italy	94,508	98,857	25,500	64	3.877
Basilicata	Italy	15,083	15,778	29,700	74	0.530
Calabria	Italy	40,003	41,844	22,800	57	1.834
Sicily	Italy	112,030	117,185	24,500	61	4.787
Sardinia	Italy	43,468	45,468	29,000	73	1.562
Autonomous Province of Bolzano - South Tyrol	Italy	33,080	34,602	64,200	161	0.539
Autonomous Province of Trento	Italy	26,056	27,255	49,900	125	0.546
Veneto	Italy	201,246	210,507	43,400	109	4.853
Friuli-Venezia Giulia	Italy	46,602	48,746	40,800	102	1.193
Emilia-Romagna	Italy	198,395	207,525	46,600	117	4.461
Toscana	Italy	143,563	150,170	41,000	103	3.657
Umbria	Italy	27,674	28,947	34,000	85	0.851
Marche	Italy	50,510	52,834	35,700	89	1.480
Lazio	Italy	246,487	257,830	45,100	113	5.709
Latvia	Latvia	40,297	50,983	27,300	68	1.860
Sostinės regionas	Lithuania	36,174	46,206	53,000	133	0.876
Central and Western Lithuania Region	Lithuania	42,822	54,699	27,100	68	2.013
Luxembourg	Luxembourg	86,180	66,277	97,700	245	0.681
Malta	Malta	23,095	24,985	43,900	110	0.574
Groningen	Netherlands	32,846	28,166	46,800	117	0.602
Friesland	Netherlands	30,149	25,854	39,100	98	0.664
Drenthe	Netherlands	22,581	19,364	38,300	96	0.506
Overijssel	Netherlands	64,470	55,286	46,400	116	1.195
Gelderland	Netherlands	114,887	98,520	45,700	114	2.161
Flevoland	Netherlands	21,879	18,762	41,300	103	0.456
North Holland	Netherlands	243,327	208,662	69,900	175	2.992
Zeeland	Netherlands	20,626	17,688	45,100	113	0.392
Utrecht	Netherlands	106,260	91,122	64,900	162	1.409
South Holland	Netherlands	231,245	198,301	51,500	129	3.863
North Brabant	Netherlands	171,621	147,171	55,400	139	2.664
Limburg (Netherlands)	Netherlands	58,267	49,966	44,100	110	1.135
Lesser Poland	Poland	69,015	95,612	28,100	70	3.319
Silesian	Poland	97,391	134,924	31,400	79	4.190
Greater Poland	Poland	83,567	115,773	32,900	82	3.433
West Pomeranian	Poland	30,031	41,604	25,700	64	1.571
Lubusz	Poland	17,660	24,466	25,000	63	0.943
Lower Silesian	Poland	70,200	97,254	33,300	83	2.798
Opole	Poland	16,562	22,945	25,300	63	0.884
Kuyavian-Pomeranian	Poland	35,719	49,484	25,300	63	1.920
Warmian-Masurian	Poland	20,994	29,085	22,200	56	1.286
Pomeranian	Poland	50,993	70,644	29,900	75	2.297
Łódź	Poland	50,902	70,518	29,600	74	2.312
Holy Cross	Poland	19,642	27,212	24,000	60	1.112
Lublin	Poland	31,361	43,447	22,100	55	1.920
Subcarpathian	Poland	32,683	45,279	22,900	57	1.947
Podlaskie	Poland	19,131	26,503	24,300	61	1.073
Warsaw	Poland	156,556	216,890	62,800	157	3.298
Masovian Regional	Poland	46,085	63,845	28,500	71	2.185
Northern Portugal	Portugal	85,749	104,234	28,300	71	3.692
Algarve	Portugal	14,312	17,397	35,600	89	0.492
Central Portugal	Portugal	39,654	48,202	28,200	71	1.717
Greater Lisbon	Portugal	90,686	110,234	51,500	129	2.156
Setúbal Peninsula	Portugal	15,320	18,623	22,100	55	0.848
Alentejo	Portugal	12,035	14,630	30,800	77	0.474
West and Tagus Valley	Portugal	18,227	22,156	25,800	65	0.865
Autonomous Region of the Azores	Portugal	5,753	6,993	29,000	73	0.241
Autonomous Region of Madeira	Portugal	7,486	9,100	35,300	88	0.259
North West	Romania	43,372	71,927	28,300	71	2.544
Centre	Romania	39,265	65,116	28,400	71	2.291
North East	Romania	37,486	62,166	19,300	48	3.218
South East	Romania	33,308	55,237	23,600	59	2.331
South - Muntenia	Romania	37,228	61,738	21,800	55	2.825
Bucharest - Ilfov	Romania	104,409	173,148	75,000	188	2.313
South West - Oltenia	Romania	26,769	44,393	24,000	60	1.848
West	Romania	31,585	52,379	31,300	78	1.671
Bratislava Region	Slovakia	36,497	45,609	61,000	153	0.736
Western Slovakia	Slovakia	40,573	50,704	28,000	70	1.797
Central Slovakia	Slovakia	25,828	32,277	24,700	62	1.297
Eastern Slovakia	Slovakia	27,310	34,129	21,400	54	1.588
Eastern Slovenia	Slovenia	28,173	32,102	28,800	72	1.113
Western Slovenia	Slovenia	39,245	44,717	44,100	110	1.017
Galicia	Spain	81,840	91,320	33,700	84	2.714
Asturias	Spain	30,012	33,489	33,100	83	1.015
Cantabria	Spain	17,700	19,750	33,400	84	0.593
Basque Country	Spain	91,613	102,225	45,800	115	2.242
Navarre	Spain	26,619	29,703	43,600	109	0.683
La Rioja (Spain)	Spain	11,112	12,399	38,100	95	0.326
Aragon	Spain	49,635	55,385	40,900	103	1.364
Community of Madrid	Spain	316,193	352,821	49,900	125	7.113
Castile and León	Spain	73,993	82,564	34,500	86	2.401
Castile-La Mancha	Spain	55,560	61,996	29,300	73	2.126
Extremadura	Spain	26,584	29,663	28,100	70	1.053
Catalonia	Spain	302,304	337,323	41,800	105	8.124
Valencian Community	Spain	148,284	165,461	30,800	77	5.425
Balearic Islands	Spain	44,693	49,870	40,300	101	1.249
Andalusia	Spain	212,359	236,959	27,400	69	8.676
Region of Murcia	Spain	42,488	47,410	30,100	75	1.586
Ceuta	Spain	1,923	2,146	25,700	64	0.083
Melilla	Spain	1,826	2,037	23,600	59	0.087
Canary Islands	Spain	58,145	64,880	28,900	72	2.258
Stockholm	Sweden	179,240	151,378	61,100	153	2.473
East Middle Sweden	Sweden	81,293	68,656	38,600	97	1.771
Småland and the islands	Sweden	39,024	32,958	37,200	93	0.880
South Sweden	Sweden	72,117	60,907	38,300	96	1.585
West Sweden	Sweden	107,555	90,836	42,700	107	2.117
North Middle Sweden	Sweden	34,528	29,161	33,900	85	0.854
Middle Norrland	Sweden	17,686	14,937	39,700	99	0.374
Upper Norrland	Sweden	27,126	22,909	43,100	108	0.529

== See also ==
- Economy of the European Union
- List of EU metropolitan areas by GDP
- List of NUTS regions in the European Union by GDP

== Sources ==
- Eurostat news release, retrieved 18 March 2018
