= List of European regions by fertility rate =

This is a list of European regions (NUTS2 regions) sorted by total fertility rate. Eurostat calculates the fertility rate based on the information provided by national statistics Institutes affiliated to Eurostat. The list presents statistics for the years 2005 to 2018 from EUROSTAT, as of May 2020.

== 2005 to 2018 list ==
List of EU regions and territories by total fertility rate 2005 to 2018
Region (NUTS2)	Country	2005	2006	2007	2008	2009	2010	2011	2012	2013	2014	2015	2016	2017	2018
Brussels	Belgium	2.06	2.11	2.09	2.07	2.10	2.04	1.95	1.94	1.88	1.90	1.85	1.82	1.81	1.77
Antwerp	Belgium	1.79	1.84	1.87	1.93	1.91	1.93	1.88	1.86	1.80	1.81	1.73	1.74	1.71	1.68
Limburg	Belgium	1.52	1.56	1.63	1.66	1.66	1.70	1.70	1.67	1.61	1.63	1.58	1.59	1.53	1.48
East Flanders	Belgium	1.69	1.74	1.74	1.82	1.80	1.79	1.77	1.72	1.68	1.67	1.65	1.61	1.56	1.57
Flemish Brabant	Belgium	1.70	1.74	1.75	1.75	1.74	1.78	1.71	1.71	1.74	1.71	1.66	1.68	1.64	1.59
West Flanders	Belgium	1.68	1.72	1.76	1.83	1.77	1.80	1.78	1.73	1.71	1.68	1.65	1.69	1.59	1.64
Walloon Brabant	Belgium	1.76	1.84	1.80	1.80	1.83	1.82	1.73	1.75	1.72	1.71	1.71	1.64	1.63	1.54
Hainaut	Belgium	1.78	1.81	1.85	1.85	1.83	1.86	1.84	1.82	1.78	1.76	1.71	1.66	1.65	1.61
Liège	Belgium	1.77	1.79	1.78	1.83	1.83	1.87	1.83	1.80	1.73	1.74	1.68	1.68	1.66	1.61
Luxembourg	Belgium	1.87	1.87	1.89	1.88	1.75	1.98	1.93	1.96	1.88	1.83	1.79	1.69	1.69	1.63
Namur	Belgium	1.82	1.84	1.85	1.87	1.84	1.88	1.86	1.79	1.76	1.70	1.66	1.63	1.56	1.57
Severozapaden	Bulgaria	1.51	1.57	1.62	1.74	1.86	1.76	1.73	1.71	1.62	1.73	1.71	1.73	1.73	1.76
Severen tsentralen	Bulgaria	1.34	1.37	1.43	1.51	1.59	1.51	1.42	1.45	1.43	1.44	1.42	1.45	1.45	1.45
Severoiztochen	Bulgaria	1.41	1.55	1.57	1.65	1.73	1.61	1.55	1.52	1.49	1.51	1.47	1.51	1.48	1.49
Yugoiztochen	Bulgaria	1.57	1.71	1.78	1.83	1.95	1.81	1.77	1.75	1.78	1.83	1.84	1.82	1.88	1.85
Yugozapaden	Bulgaria	1.21	1.27	1.32	1.39	1.47	1.41	1.34	1.32	1.29	1.36	1.34	1.36	1.37	1.37
Yuzhen tsentralen	Bulgaria	1.38	1.45	1.51	1.57	1.69	1.62	1.54	1.54	1.55	1.59	1.63	1.61	1.65	1.65
Prague	Czech Republic	1.25	1.29	1.33	1.41	1.41	1.43	1.35	1.38	1.36	1.45	1.47	1.49	1.55	1.56
Central Bohemia	Czech Republic	1.34	1.38	1.52	1.60	1.58	1.58	1.53	1.54	1.54	1.61	1.64	1.69	1.79	1.74
Jihozápad	Czech Republic	1.27	1.35	1.45	1.51	1.51	1.50	1.39	1.48	1.44	1.50	1.58	1.64	1.70	1.72
Severozápad	Czech Republic	1.36	1.42	1.56	1.62	1.59	1.57	1.49	1.44	1.46	1.52	1.56	1.62	1.67	1.66
Severovýchod	Czech Republic	1.28	1.34	1.50	1.54	1.55	1.55	1.45	1.49	1.48	1.55	1.60	1.69	1.70	1.74
Jihovýchod	Czech Republic	1.27	1.31	1.40	1.49	1.48	1.49	1.43	1.46	1.47	1.57	1.59	1.66	1.73	1.76
Central Moravia	Czech Republic	1.24	1.27	1.38	1.44	1.45	1.46	1.36	1.38	1.42	1.47	1.55	1.66	1.67	1.71
Moravian-Silesia	Czech Republic	1.29	1.33	1.46	1.48	1.49	1.50	1.38	1.41	1.41	1.49	1.50	1.56	1.60	1.68
Capital Region of Denmark	Denmark			1.72	1.73	1.71	1.76	1.64	1.65	1.58	1.63	1.63	1.70	1.67	1.65
Zealand	Denmark			1.99	2.05	1.93	2.00	1.83	1.77	1.73	1.75	1.82	1.89	1.83	1.83
Central Denmark	Denmark			1.89	1.92	1.91	1.92	1.85	1.78	1.72	1.74	1.77	1.87	1.83	1.81
Southern Denmark	Denmark			1.89	2.04	1.96	2.00	1.85	1.84	1.81	1.77	1.79	1.84	1.82	1.78
North Denmark	Denmark			1.89	2.01	1.93	1.93	1.82	1.83	1.70	1.73	1.77	1.84	1.81	1.77
Stuttgart (region)	Germany	1.38	1.36	1.39	1.39	1.36	1.40	1.37	1.40	1.41	1.47	1.53	1.60	1.58	1.58
Karlsruhe (region)	Germany	1.30	1.29	1.31	1.33	1.31	1.33	1.31	1.35	1.36	1.42	1.46	1.54	1.51	1.52
Tubingen (region)	Germany	1.39	1.38	1.41	1.41	1.39	1.41	1.39	1.43	1.43	1.50	1.53	1.62	1.63	1.62
Freiburg (region)	Germany	1.36	1.33	1.38	1.39	1.38	1.39	1.36	1.42	1.41	1.47	1.51	1.62	1.58	1.61
Upper Bavaria	Germany	1.35	1.33	1.38	1.36	1.36	1.38	1.36	1.42	1.42	1.47	1.49	1.55	1.54	1.55
Lower Bavaria	Germany	1.36	1.33	1.35	1.39	1.34	1.37	1.34	1.40	1.39	1.44	1.49	1.55	1.55	1.53
Upper Palatinate	Germany	1.32	1.31	1.31	1.33	1.31	1.34	1.28	1.35	1.35	1.41	1.46	1.49	1.50	1.56
Upper Franconia	Germany	1.27	1.27	1.30	1.32	1.28	1.32	1.30	1.33	1.32	1.38	1.41	1.50	1.51	1.49
Middle Franconia	Germany	1.31	1.29	1.35	1.34	1.32	1.35	1.32	1.37	1.40	1.44	1.48	1.59	1.56	1.56
Lower Franconia	Germany	1.30	1.29	1.29	1.30	1.28	1.29	1.30	1.35	1.37	1.42	1.47	1.55	1.56	1.53
Swabia	Germany	1.41	1.38	1.43	1.43	1.40	1.42	1.39	1.42	1.46	1.50	1.54	1.65	1.63	1.62
Berlin	Germany	1.19	1.21	1.28	1.30	1.30	1.34	1.31	1.43	1.37	1.46	1.46	1.55	1.48	1.45
Brandenburg	Germany	1.28	1.29	1.37	1.40	1.40	1.45	1.41	1.47	1.46	1.55	1.53	1.69	1.64	1.62
Bremen	Germany	1.26	1.27	1.29	1.30	1.29	1.31	1.27	1.34	1.35	1.46	1.51	1.63	1.58	1.60
Hamburg	Germany	1.23	1.22	1.25	1.25	1.25	1.29	1.26	1.35	1.33	1.41	1.45	1.55	1.51	1.49
Darmstadt (region)	Germany	1.37	1.34	1.41	1.40	1.39	1.42	1.41	1.42	1.42	1.48	1.51	1.60	1.59	1.59
Gießen (region)	Germany	1.31	1.29	1.29	1.33	1.28	1.34	1.33	1.31	1.32	1.36	1.42	1.50	1.49	1.49
Kassel (region)	Germany	1.35	1.34	1.38	1.33	1.34	1.38	1.38	1.42	1.41	1.48	1.52	1.63	1.64	1.57
Mecklenburg-Vorpommern	Germany	1.29	1.32	1.36	1.41	1.42	1.48	1.41	1.46	1.44	1.49	1.54	1.57	1.54	1.55
Braunschweig (region)	Germany	1.29	1.30	1.34	1.34	1.30	1.34	1.30	1.37	1.36	1.47	1.48	1.68	1.55	1.59
Hanover (region)	Germany	1.32	1.33	1.35	1.38	1.33	1.38	1.35	1.37	1.40	1.48	1.48	1.64	1.55	1.57
Lüneburg (region)	Germany	1.45	1.46	1.48	1.47	1.46	1.50	1.45	1.47	1.53	1.60	1.59	1.71	1.70	1.70
Weser-Ems (region)	Germany	1.48	1.45	1.46	1.49	1.44	1.46	1.43	1.49	1.47	1.57	1.55	1.71	1.68	1.64
Düsseldorf (region)	Germany	1.36	1.36	1.38	1.39	1.35	1.39	1.35	1.41	1.39	1.48	1.51	1.63	1.60	1.59
Cologne (region)	Germany	1.33	1.32	1.35	1.37	1.34	1.39	1.35	1.39	1.37	1.46	1.48	1.57	1.53	1.54
Münster (region)	Germany	1.38	1.37	1.41	1.41	1.39	1.41	1.37	1.41	1.41	1.50	1.55	1.64	1.63	1.66
Detmold (region)	Germany	1.48	1.47	1.50	1.48	1.47	1.50	1.46	1.48	1.49	1.56	1.60	1.71	1.67	1.67
Arnsberg (region)	Germany	1.37	1.34	1.38	1.38	1.34	1.36	1.32	1.39	1.39	1.47	1.50	1.60	1.62	1.59
Koblenz (region)	Germany	1.38	1.38	1.41	1.44	1.38	1.41	1.40	1.41	1.44	1.49	1.54	1.65	1.62	1.63
Trier (region)	Germany	1.33	1.28	1.35	1.34	1.34	1.38	1.31	1.30	1.38	1.41	1.46	1.53	1.52	1.46
Rheinhessen-Pfalz (region)	Germany	1.33	1.30	1.35	1.35	1.31	1.37	1.36	1.38	1.40	1.47	1.51	1.60	1.59	1.60
Saarland	Germany	1.25	1.23	1.26	1.25	1.23	1.27	1.27	1.27	1.25	1.36	1.38	1.49	1.51	1.47
Dresden (region)	Germany	1.36	1.37	1.46	1.47	1.49	1.54	1.53	1.58	1.56	1.62	1.61	1.69	1.65	1.62
Chemnitz (region)	Germany							1.48	1.54	1.56	1.60	1.66	1.74	1.73	1.70
Leipzig (region)	Germany							1.40	1.43	1.42	1.49	1.51	1.57	1.49	1.49
Saxony-Anhalt	Germany	1.27	1.27	1.34	1.39	1.37	1.41	1.40	1.45	1.45	1.50	1.54	1.62	1.61	1.61
Schleswig-Holstein	Germany	1.37	1.38	1.42	1.42	1.40	1.45	1.37	1.44	1.42	1.48	1.52	1.61	1.58	1.58
Thuringia	Germany	1.26	1.26	1.34	1.37	1.36	1.43	1.41	1.48	1.48	1.55	1.56	1.63	1.63	1.60
Estonia	Estonia	1.52	1.58	1.69	1.72	1.70	1.72	1.61	1.56	1.52	1.54	1.58	1.60	1.59	1.67
Border, Midland and Western (NUTS 2013)	Ireland	2.03	2.04	2.06	2.16	2.12	2.11	2.08	2.04						
Southern and Eastern (NUTS 2013)	Ireland	1.96	1.97	1.99	2.03	2.04	2.03	2.03	1.96						
Northern and Western	Ireland									1.98	1.94	1.94	1.94	1.88	1.89
Southern	Ireland									1.96	1.93	1.93	1.86	1.84	1.85
Eastern and Midland	Ireland									1.90	1.87	1.79	1.75	1.70	1.66
Eastern Macedonia and Thrace	Greece	1.53	1.58	1.55	1.61	1.62	1.62	1.51	1.41	1.38	1.35	1.40	1.41	1.42	1.32
Central Macedonia	Greece	1.35	1.41	1.44	1.53	1.52	1.50	1.41	1.35	1.30	1.27	1.31	1.36	1.29	1.28
Western Macedonia	Greece	1.35	1.40	1.41	1.47	1.47	1.49	1.35	1.36	1.29	1.33	1.32	1.31	1.34	1.26
Epirus	Greece	1.25	1.34	1.29	1.41	1.43	1.46	1.38	1.29	1.29	1.26	1.28	1.30	1.26	1.22
Thessaly	Greece	1.47	1.55	1.50	1.62	1.59	1.60	1.51	1.41	1.34	1.32	1.35	1.35	1.33	1.32
Ionian Islands	Greece	1.46	1.51	1.46	1.72	1.53	1.56	1.46	1.38	1.42	1.43	1.45	1.49	1.50	1.60
Western Greece	Greece	1.39	1.40	1.38	1.55	1.53	1.52	1.45	1.35	1.33	1.31	1.33	1.36	1.32	1.29
Central Greece	Greece	1.42	1.50	1.45	1.58	1.52	1.52	1.34	1.31	1.25	1.24	1.23	1.30	1.24	1.23
Peloponnese	Greece	1.41	1.49	1.48	1.57	1.57	1.59	1.44	1.41	1.31	1.33	1.32	1.37	1.35	1.35
Attica	Greece	1.24	1.31	1.33	1.39	1.40	1.38	1.33	1.28	1.23	1.26	1.30	1.36	1.34	1.36
North Aegean	Greece	1.31	1.33	1.43	1.50	1.47	1.50	1.38	1.42	1.36	1.40	1.44	1.55	1.55	1.63
South Aegean	Greece	1.33	1.36	1.39	1.46	1.50	1.48	1.34	1.39	1.31	1.39	1.38	1.54	1.52	1.54
Crete	Greece	1.53	1.64	1.65	1.76	1.74	1.69	1.52	1.53	1.42	1.44	1.47	1.55	1.49	1.52
Galicia	Spain	1.02	1.04	1.06	1.13	1.10	1.09	1.08	1.09	1.04	1.07	1.10	1.12	1.12	1.04
Asturias	Spain	0.96	0.98	1.02	1.08	1.08	1.04	1.05	1.06	0.96	0.99	1.01	1.04	1.03	1.03
Cantabria	Spain	1.21	1.19	1.21	1.32	1.26	1.26	1.22	1.19	1.18	1.15	1.15	1.15	1.17	1.12
Basque Country	Spain	1.18	1.21	1.25	1.30	1.29	1.33	1.35	1.35	1.30	1.38	1.39	1.39	1.35	1.30
Navarre	Spain	1.33	1.41	1.41	1.49	1.44	1.44	1.43	1.46	1.36	1.44	1.44	1.46	1.46	1.39
La Rioja	Spain	1.33	1.33	1.41	1.49	1.41	1.44	1.37	1.41	1.33	1.35	1.34	1.36	1.35	1.25
Aragon	Spain	1.24	1.30	1.34	1.42	1.35	1.36	1.34	1.30	1.30	1.34	1.35	1.34	1.33	1.29
Community of Madrid	Spain	1.32	1.36	1.40	1.46	1.40	1.37	1.35	1.33	1.29	1.35	1.37	1.36	1.33	1.27
Castile and León	Spain	1.10	1.13	1.15	1.22	1.18	1.20	1.19	1.17	1.13	1.17	1.18	1.18	1.14	1.14
Castilla–La Mancha	Spain	1.34	1.40	1.39	1.50	1.45	1.43	1.39	1.35	1.30	1.30	1.33	1.34	1.32	1.27
Extremadura	Spain	1.30	1.32	1.30	1.40	1.35	1.34	1.33	1.27	1.22	1.29	1.28	1.30	1.29	1.22
Catalonia	Spain	1.41	1.44	1.45	1.53	1.47	1.46	1.43	1.40	1.34	1.39	1.40	1.41	1.39	1.33
Valencia	Spain	1.37	1.39	1.42	1.48	1.36	1.36	1.32	1.31	1.26	1.31	1.32	1.32	1.30	1.25
Balearic Islands	Spain	1.35	1.40	1.39	1.44	1.36	1.35	1.27	1.25	1.22	1.24	1.24	1.26	1.22	1.22
Andalusia	Spain	1.46	1.50	1.51	1.57	1.48	1.45	1.42	1.40	1.34	1.39	1.40	1.41	1.36	1.32
Murcia	Spain	1.59	1.62	1.65	1.70	1.62	1.59	1.56	1.53	1.51	1.56	1.57	1.56	1.55	1.53
Ceuta	Spain	1.87	1.82	1.99	2.03	1.97	1.99	1.91	1.84	1.79	1.99	1.85	1.81	1.81	1.70
Melilla	Spain	1.95	2.11	2.05	2.27	2.26	2.36	2.48	2.52	2.49	2.69	2.53	2.47	2.30	2.33
Canary Islands	Spain	1.24	1.26	1.19	1.24	1.14	1.11	1.07	1.07	0.99	1.04	1.05	1.06	1.05	0.98
Île-de-France (Paris Metro)	France	1.96	2.03	1.99	2.01	2.02	2.05	2.03	2.02	2.01	2.04	2.00	1.98	1.96	1.94
Centre-Val de Loire	France	1.96	2.01	1.99	2.05	2.04	2.10	2.05	2.06	2.02	2.02	1.94	1.93	1.89	1.88
Burgundy	France	1.86	1.91	1.92	1.95	1.93	1.94	1.93	1.94	1.91	1.91	1.87	1.80	1.77	1.78
Franche-Comté	France	2.01	2.09	2.05	2.07	2.04	2.07	2.02	2.01	1.98	1.98	1.93	1.91	1.86	1.83
Lower Normandy	France	1.95	2.01	2.00	1.99	2.01	2.00	1.99	1.97	1.93	1.91	1.87	1.82	1.77	1.77
Upper Normandy	France	1.98	2.02	2.03	2.05	2.05	2.09	2.09	2.09	2.03	2.00	1.97	1.95	1.91	1.90
Nord-Pas-de-Calais	France	2.02	2.08	2.07	2.09	2.08	2.11	2.12	2.10	2.10	2.09	2.01	1.96	1.92	1.86
Picardy	France	2.02	2.07	2.05	2.09	2.07	2.11	2.11	2.09	2.06	2.05	2.01	1.94	1.92	1.86
Alsace	France	1.79	1.85	1.81	1.82	1.84	1.88	1.83	1.82	1.83	1.86	1.79	1.76	1.75	1.74
Champagne-Ardenne	France	1.92	1.95	1.95	2.00	1.98	2.00	1.98	1.95	1.95	1.93	1.88	1.83	1.75	1.76
Lorraine	France	1.82	1.86	1.82	1.84	1.82	1.83	1.80	1.81	1.80	1.80	1.74	1.72	1.70	1.65
Pays de la Loire	France	2.06	2.12	2.09	2.11	2.11	2.13	2.10	2.09	2.07	2.03	1.96	1.91	1.88	1.86
Brittany	France	1.95	2.04	2.00	2.04	2.02	2.02	2.01	2.00	1.95	1.93	1.86	1.82	1.81	1.80
Aquitaine	France	1.72	1.80	1.79	1.81	1.83	1.83	1.81	1.80	1.79	1.79	1.73	1.70	1.67	1.65
Limousin	France	1.77	1.76	1.76	1.80	1.84	1.80	1.84	1.84	1.78	1.80	1.75	1.70	1.70	1.69
Poitou-Charentes	France	1.86	1.88	1.85	1.93	1.92	1.93	1.91	1.91	1.89	1.87	1.79	1.79	1.71	1.71
Languedoc-Roussillon	France	1.84	1.92	1.91	1.96	1.96	1.96	1.97	1.94	1.94	1.91	1.88	1.84	1.80	1.80
Midi-Pyrénées	France	1.74	1.83	1.83	1.86	1.84	1.86	1.86	1.88	1.82	1.84	1.77	1.72	1.70	1.68
Auvergne	France	1.78	1.84	1.80	1.83	1.85	1.91	1.84	1.87	1.84	1.86	1.80	1.77	1.76	1.78
Rhône-Alpes	France	1.96	2.02	2.00	2.04	2.03	2.06	2.03	2.04	2.01	2.02	1.97	1.92	1.89	1.89
Provence-Alpes-Côte d'Azur	France	1.89	1.95	1.94	2.00	2.01	2.06	2.03	2.06	2.07	2.06	2.02	1.99	1.98	1.97
Corsica	France	1.62	1.57	1.57	1.62	1.64	1.63	1.64	1.57	1.50	1.52	1.46	1.47	1.46	1.42
Guadeloupe	France									2.27	2.27	2.18	2.19	1.98	2.09
Martinique	France	1.85	2.04	2.05	2.10	2.07	2.02	1.91	1.98	1.91	2.08	1.95	1.91	1.88	1.94
French Guiana	France	3.79	3.80	3.73	3.56	3.49	3.37	3.41	3.60	3.46	3.43	3.46	3.61	3.82	3.81
Réunion	France	2.49	2.44	2.47	2.47	2.37	2.36	2.37	2.43	2.41	2.44	2.45	2.43	2.46	2.40
Mayotte	France										4.12	4.88	4.95	4.91	4.66
Adriatic Croatia	Croatia	1.51	1.48	1.48	1.55	1.57	1.54	1.46	1.51	1.44	1.44	1.40	1.41	1.39	1.43
Continental Croatia	Croatia	1.50	1.46	1.48	1.55	1.59	1.55	1.49	1.52	1.47	1.47	1.40	1.43	1.43	1.49
Piedmont	Italy	1.28	1.33	1.37	1.42	1.43	1.44	1.45	1.45	1.41	1.40	1.36	1.35	1.34	1.28
Aosta Valley	Italy	1.34	1.45	1.48	1.57	1.63	1.63	1.60	1.57	1.44	1.54	1.40	1.41	1.35	1.38
Liguria	Italy	1.19	1.24	1.28	1.35	1.36	1.37	1.34	1.40	1.34	1.33	1.30	1.30	1.28	1.23
Lombardy	Italy	1.37	1.43	1.47	1.54	1.57	1.57	1.53	1.52	1.48	1.46	1.44	1.42	1.39	1.35
South Tyrol	Italy	1.60	1.58	1.62	1.62	1.57	1.63	1.62	1.67	1.65	1.74	1.70	1.76	1.74	1.72
Trentino	Italy	1.50	1.52	1.53	1.61	1.61	1.66	1.62	1.60	1.60	1.54	1.56	1.52	1.49	1.45
Veneto	Italy	1.36	1.41	1.44	1.49	1.49	1.50	1.48	1.48	1.42	1.41	1.38	1.38	1.36	1.33
Friuli-Venezia Giulia	Italy	1.24	1.29	1.34	1.36	1.38	1.40	1.38	1.41	1.37	1.38	1.32	1.33	1.31	1.28
Emilia-Romagna	Italy	1.36	1.41	1.46	1.51	1.54	1.54	1.50	1.49	1.45	1.42	1.42	1.40	1.35	1.34
Tuscany	Italy	1.28	1.31	1.36	1.42	1.39	1.42	1.40	1.41	1.35	1.35	1.30	1.30	1.28	1.25
Umbria	Italy	1.34	1.37	1.40	1.45	1.39	1.42	1.40	1.39	1.37	1.32	1.27	1.26	1.24	1.21
Marche	Italy	1.28	1.33	1.36	1.43	1.44	1.42	1.42	1.38	1.34	1.35	1.33	1.32	1.25	1.22
Lazio	Italy	1.28	1.35	1.36	1.48	1.44	1.46	1.48	1.47	1.42	1.35	1.32	1.33	1.27	1.22
Abruzzo	Italy	1.23	1.23	1.28	1.33	1.31	1.37	1.35	1.35	1.30	1.29	1.28	1.28	1.24	1.19
Molise	Italy	1.15	1.14	1.18	1.19	1.14	1.24	1.19	1.19	1.17	1.16	1.17	1.15	1.19	1.09
Campania	Italy	1.45	1.47	1.48	1.47	1.47	1.45	1.43	1.40	1.35	1.32	1.34	1.34	1.35	1.31
Apulia	Italy	1.30	1.29	1.32	1.34	1.35	1.35	1.32	1.30	1.28	1.28	1.24	1.25	1.24	1.22
Basilicata	Italy	1.16	1.20	1.20	1.23	1.20	1.20	1.19	1.21	1.12	1.15	1.17	1.17	1.19	1.13
Calabria	Italy	1.26	1.30	1.30	1.30	1.32	1.32	1.30	1.30	1.28	1.27	1.29	1.28	1.28	1.26
Sicily	Italy	1.43	1.43	1.42	1.45	1.45	1.44	1.42	1.42	1.36	1.38	1.35	1.33	1.35	1.34
Sardinia	Italy	1.07	1.09	1.11	1.14	1.17	1.19	1.17	1.15	1.11	1.10	1.09	1.07	1.06	1.02
Cyprus	Cyprus	1.48	1.52	1.44	1.48	1.47	1.44	1.35	1.39	1.30	1.31	1.32	1.37	1.32	1.32
Latvia	Latvia	1.39	1.46	1.54	1.58	1.46	1.36	1.33	1.44	1.52	1.65	1.70	1.74	1.69	1.60
Vilnius County	Lithuania			1.32	1.42	1.51	1.48	1.45	1.45	1.42	1.48	1.53	1.55	1.49	1.50
Central and Western Lithuania Region	Lithuania			1.37	1.46	1.50	1.50	1.60	1.66	1.67	1.70	1.79	1.76	1.70	1.71
Luxembourg	Luxembourg	1.63	1.65	1.61	1.61	1.59	1.63	1.52	1.57	1.55	1.50	1.47	1.41	1.39	1.38
Central Hungary (NUTS 2013)	Hungary	1.21	1.26	1.23	1.26	1.23	1.18	1.14	1.25	1.26	1.29	1.30	1.36		
Pest County	Hungary													1.21	1.21
Budapest	Hungary													1.58	1.60
Central Transdanubia	Hungary	1.26	1.28	1.27	1.31	1.28	1.22	1.19	1.32	1.34	1.43	1.46	1.55	1.55	1.52
Western Transdanubia	Hungary	1.21	1.22	1.19	1.21	1.19	1.14	1.10	1.22	1.25	1.33	1.33	1.42	1.46	1.47
Southern Transdanubia	Hungary	1.28	1.31	1.29	1.30	1.29	1.22	1.20	1.31	1.35	1.47	1.46	1.53	1.55	1.57
Northern Hungary	Hungary	1.44	1.49	1.45	1.50	1.47	1.41	1.41	1.47	1.52	1.65	1.66	1.77	1.82	1.84
Northern Great Plain	Hungary	1.42	1.44	1.43	1.45	1.42	1.31	1.32	1.40	1.45	1.59	1.60	1.72	1.70	1.69
Southern Great Plain	Hungary	1.26	1.26	1.25	1.28	1.25	1.15	1.16	1.27	1.32	1.39	1.42	1.49	1.56	1.55
Malta	Malta	1.38	1.36	1.35	1.43	1.42	1.36	1.45	1.42	1.36	1.38	1.37	1.37	1.26	1.23
Groningen	Netherlands	1.53	1.54	1.54	1.63	1.65	1.61	1.66	1.59	1.52	1.54	1.52	1.54	1.45	1.39
Friesland	Netherlands	1.90	1.91	1.91	1.95	2.00	2.00	1.91	1.89	1.84	1.86	1.78	1.79	1.77	1.71
Drenthe	Netherlands	1.87	1.89	1.88	1.94	2.02	1.95	1.92	1.86	1.78	1.85	1.73	1.79	1.77	1.68
Overijssel	Netherlands	1.92	1.92	1.91	1.95	1.95	1.95	1.89	1.86	1.84	1.84	1.79	1.79	1.72	1.69
Gelderland	Netherlands	1.74	1.79	1.75	1.83	1.83	1.83	1.80	1.75	1.74	1.76	1.73	1.71	1.70	1.66
Flevoland	Netherlands	1.99	1.96	2.00	1.96	2.04	2.04	1.95	1.91	1.80	1.89	1.82	1.80	1.72	1.78
Utrecht	Netherlands	1.72	1.75	1.78	1.79	1.81	1.82	1.76	1.77	1.71	1.76	1.70	1.69	1.68	1.63
North Holland	Netherlands	1.65	1.62	1.64	1.67	1.71	1.72	1.65	1.62	1.59	1.62	1.57	1.57	1.52	1.49
South Holland	Netherlands	1.68	1.69	1.68	1.76	1.77	1.78	1.78	1.75	1.69	1.74	1.67	1.69	1.64	1.61
Zeeland	Netherlands	1.83	1.82	1.83	1.94	1.88	1.89	1.94	1.89	1.83	1.89	1.87	1.79	1.76	1.72
North Brabant	Netherlands	1.69	1.71	1.70	1.78	1.78	1.79	1.76	1.70	1.66	1.70	1.64	1.66	1.61	1.58
Limburg	Netherlands	1.54	1.57	1.55	1.57	1.65	1.64	1.59	1.56	1.55	1.51	1.49	1.53	1.48	1.45
Burgenland	Austria	1.27	1.25	1.29	1.31	1.27	1.28	1.28	1.30	1.27	1.33	1.37	1.41	1.36	1.38
Lower Austria	Austria	1.46	1.46	1.41	1.46	1.42	1.47	1.48	1.49	1.48	1.51	1.52	1.59	1.57	1.52
Vienna	Austria	1.37	1.39	1.36	1.39	1.37	1.42	1.42	1.40	1.40	1.41	1.42	1.45	1.41	1.36
Carinthia	Austria	1.37	1.42	1.38	1.40	1.37	1.43	1.40	1.41	1.41	1.43	1.43	1.50	1.51	1.44
Styria	Austria	1.32	1.31	1.30	1.32	1.32	1.36	1.33	1.36	1.35	1.36	1.44	1.44	1.46	1.42
Upper Austria	Austria	1.49	1.49	1.48	1.52	1.51	1.55	1.53	1.55	1.55	1.61	1.61	1.68	1.66	1.62
Salzburg	Austria	1.45	1.39	1.41	1.44	1.39	1.47	1.46	1.46	1.48	1.55	1.54	1.57	1.61	1.54
Tyrol	Austria	1.40	1.41	1.37	1.39	1.38	1.42	1.40	1.44	1.44	1.44	1.52	1.51	1.52	1.50
Vorarlberg	Austria	1.54	1.52	1.47	1.51	1.51	1.56	1.53	1.56	1.52	1.61	1.63	1.71	1.67	1.68
Łódź	Poland	1.19	1.22	1.25	1.34	1.37	1.35	1.28	1.29	1.25	1.28	1.27	1.34	1.42	1.41
Masovia (without Warsaw)	Poland										1.41	1.41	1.45	1.57	1.52
Warsaw	Poland										1.35	1.40	1.50	1.56	1.59
Lesser Poland	Poland	1.27	1.27	1.31	1.40	1.41	1.40	1.33	1.32	1.32	1.33	1.35	1.43	1.52	1.53
Silesia	Poland	1.13	1.17	1.21	1.30	1.33	1.34	1.27	1.27	1.27	1.29	1.28	1.35	1.45	1.41
Lublin	Poland	1.34	1.34	1.35	1.42	1.41	1.38	1.30	1.30	1.25	1.27	1.28	1.29	1.39	1.36
Podkarpackie	Poland	1.29	1.26	1.29	1.36	1.35	1.32	1.26	1.27	1.28	1.26	1.25	1.30	1.42	1.41
Świętokrzyskie	Poland	1.24	1.22	1.28	1.35	1.35	1.32	1.23	1.23	1.19	1.21	1.21	1.23	1.29	1.29
Podlaskie	Poland	1.26	1.25	1.26	1.34	1.36	1.32	1.23	1.23	1.23	1.29	1.28	1.36	1.46	1.45
Greater Poland	Poland	1.31	1.34	1.39	1.48	1.48	1.48	1.38	1.38	1.36	1.39	1.40	1.48	1.60	1.57
West Pomerania	Poland	1.23	1.25	1.30	1.38	1.36	1.31	1.22	1.23	1.24	1.27	1.25	1.33	1.41	1.36
Lubusz	Poland	1.25	1.30	1.34	1.41	1.43	1.36	1.30	1.31	1.28	1.30	1.28	1.36	1.46	1.38
Lower Silesia	Poland	1.14	1.17	1.22	1.31	1.31	1.29	1.21	1.20	1.19	1.26	1.24	1.32	1.39	1.39
Opole	Poland	1.04	1.04	1.04	1.13	1.14	1.14	1.10	1.15	1.16	1.23	1.21	1.28	1.36	1.32
Kuyavian-Pomerania	Poland	1.27	1.31	1.35	1.43	1.42	1.39	1.30	1.29	1.28	1.31	1.27	1.34	1.43	1.39
Warmian-Masuria	Poland	1.35	1.37	1.41	1.46	1.48	1.40	1.31	1.28	1.27	1.32	1.27	1.32	1.45	1.39
Pomerania	Poland	1.35	1.39	1.45	1.55	1.54	1.50	1.39	1.40	1.38	1.43	1.44	1.54	1.66	1.62
Norte	Portugal	1.32	1.28	1.24	1.28	1.24	1.27	1.24	1.15	1.10	1.09	1.17	1.24	1.24	1.26
Algarve	Portugal	1.63	1.58	1.60	1.60	1.55	1.58	1.51	1.43	1.31	1.35	1.49	1.57	1.62	1.72
Centro	Portugal	1.33	1.29	1.25	1.28	1.22	1.26	1.23	1.18	1.11	1.12	1.19	1.22	1.23	1.27
Lisbon Metropolitan Area	Portugal	1.57	1.53	1.54	1.60	1.56	1.63	1.56	1.50	1.43	1.50	1.56	1.63	1.67	1.72
Alentejo	Portugal	1.39	1.31	1.28	1.36	1.31	1.37	1.34	1.33	1.22	1.22	1.34	1.37	1.35	1.43
Azores	Portugal	1.57	1.46	1.49	1.49	1.47	1.44	1.47	1.34	1.27	1.27	1.25	1.27	1.25	1.29
Madeira	Portugal	1.46	1.44	1.34	1.33	1.17	1.27	1.24	1.08	0.98	0.95	1.10	1.07	1.16	1.16
Nord-Vest	Romania	1.36	1.34	1.30	1.37	1.37	1.34	1.34	1.48	1.38	1.50	1.54	1.59	1.66	1.69
Centru	Romania	1.37	1.36	1.33	1.42	1.44	1.40	1.45	1.63	1.60	1.70	1.69	1.76	1.84	1.84
Nord-Est	Romania	1.53	1.52	1.50	1.52	1.48	1.41	1.52	1.90	1.80	1.92	1.93	1.95	2.02	2.09
Sud-Est	Romania	1.29	1.30	1.29	1.33	1.35	1.32	1.34	1.60	1.57	1.67	1.68	1.77	1.82	1.84
Sud - Muntenia	Romania	1.31	1.31	1.29	1.35	1.41	1.36	1.36	1.52	1.44	1.53	1.58	1.64	1.70	1.74
Bucharest - Ilfov	Romania	1.11	1.15	1.15	1.24	1.31	1.28	1.16	1.17	1.13	1.22	1.24	1.32	1.41	1.53
Sud-Vest	Romania	1.22	1.17	1.17	1.21	1.26	1.20	1.27	1.48	1.39	1.47	1.48	1.52	1.58	1.66
Vest	Romania	1.24	1.24	1.20	1.26	1.26	1.22	1.21	1.33	1.27	1.39	1.43	1.51	1.53	1.60
Eastern Slovenia	Slovenia				1.47	1.48	1.51	1.52	1.54	1.53	1.59	1.58	1.61	1.67	1.64
Western Slovenia	Slovenia				1.59	1.60	1.65	1.61	1.63	1.57	1.58	1.57	1.57	1.58	1.58
Bratislava	Slovakia	1.18	1.18	1.24	1.33	1.43	1.45	1.48	1.42	1.40	1.48	1.52	1.60	1.66	1.70
Western Slovakia	Slovakia	1.09	1.09	1.10	1.18	1.25	1.25	1.27	1.17	1.19	1.22	1.23	1.31	1.34	1.35
Central Slovakia	Slovakia	1.26	1.23	1.25	1.30	1.38	1.36	1.39	1.28	1.28	1.29	1.33	1.41	1.45	1.48
Eastern Slovakia	Slovakia	1.50	1.49	1.48	1.55	1.68	1.64	1.64	1.49	1.47	1.49	1.54	1.61	1.65	1.66
Western Finland	Finland	1.86	1.92	1.89	1.91	1.95	1.93	1.90	1.91	1.81	1.79	1.72	1.64	1.54	1.44
Helsinki-Uusimaa	Finland	1.65	1.70	1.68	1.70	1.69	1.70	1.65	1.60	1.58	1.55	1.51	1.45	1.38	1.33
Southern Finland	Finland	1.71	1.72	1.74	1.76	1.76	1.81	1.74	1.73	1.68	1.66	1.62	1.51	1.47	1.36
North Karelia and Eastern Finland	Finland	2.04	2.04	2.06	2.07	2.11	2.10	2.09	2.04	1.99	1.92	1.81	1.73	1.63	1.53
Åland	Finland	1.72	1.87	1.85	1.88	1.69	1.83	1.80	1.85	1.80	1.78	1.69	1.79	1.68	1.66
Stockholm	Sweden	1.81	1.88	1.90	1.92	1.94	1.98	1.88	1.87	1.88	1.84	1.81	1.78	1.71	1.66
East Middle Sweden	Sweden	1.74	1.81	1.86	1.89	1.90	1.96	1.89	1.93	1.88	1.88	1.86	1.86	1.80	1.76
Småland and the islands	Sweden	1.82	1.91	1.91	1.96	1.99	2.05	1.97	2.01	1.97	1.99	1.96	1.98	1.91	1.88
South Sweden	Sweden	1.74	1.84	1.85	1.90	1.92	1.95	1.89	1.90	1.88	1.88	1.83	1.84	1.78	1.76
West Sweden	Sweden	1.75	1.85	1.89	1.88	1.95	2.01	1.89	1.90	1.88	1.88	1.82	1.85	1.76	1.74
North Middle Sweden	Sweden	1.80	1.85	1.90	1.89	1.94	1.99	1.92	1.96	1.87	1.92	1.91	1.92	1.89	1.89
Middle Norrland	Sweden	1.81	1.90	1.94	1.99	1.95	2.05	1.96	1.88	1.87	1.90	1.94	1.91	1.90	1.90
Upper Norrland	Sweden	1.69	1.82	1.76	1.84	1.88	1.88	1.89	1.80	1.86	1.79	1.79	1.82	1.73	1.69
Tees Valley and Durham	United Kingdom	1.84	1.89	1.91	1.94	1.91	1.99	1.97	1.95	1.84	1.82	1.79	1.77	1.71	1.66
Northumberland and Tyne and Wear	United Kingdom	1.65	1.71	1.73	1.77	1.74	1.78	1.75	1.74	1.68	1.64	1.64	1.66	1.58	1.53
Cumbria	United Kingdom	1.71	1.78	1.82	1.89	1.90	1.91	1.91	1.91	1.85	1.84	1.86	1.85	1.78	1.70
Greater Manchester	United Kingdom	1.84	1.90	1.94	1.97	1.97	1.99	1.96	1.97	1.92	1.88	1.87	1.88	1.80	1.74
Lancashire	United Kingdom	1.89	1.91	1.95	2.02	1.99	1.99	1.99	1.98	1.93	1.93	1.90	1.91	1.83	1.78
Cheshire	United Kingdom	1.75	1.79	1.86	1.92	1.88	1.96	1.94	1.97	1.87	1.85	1.88	1.86	1.82	1.74
Merseyside	United Kingdom	1.72	1.78	1.79	1.83	1.79	1.84	1.84	1.85	1.76	1.77	1.76	1.75	1.72	1.66
East Yorkshire	United Kingdom	1.78	1.88	1.89	1.91	1.91	1.94	1.94	1.98	1.89	1.84	1.85	1.82	1.78	1.71
North Yorkshire	United Kingdom	1.67	1.71	1.73	1.85	1.82	1.79	1.82	1.80	1.71	1.72	1.73	1.70	1.62	1.58
South Yorkshire	United Kingdom	1.76	1.82	1.87	1.89	1.86	1.86	1.85	1.87	1.78	1.76	1.74	1.72	1.67	1.58
West Yorkshire	United Kingdom	1.84	1.89	1.92	1.99	2.00	2.03	1.98	2.02	1.94	1.92	1.90	1.91	1.85	1.80
Derbyshire and Nottinghamshire	United Kingdom	1.69	1.76	1.82	1.88	1.86	1.92	1.93	1.92	1.82	1.80	1.79	1.76	1.69	1.61
Leicestershire, Rutland and Northamptonshire	United Kingdom	1.84	1.87	1.93	1.96	1.94	1.98	1.96	1.97	1.88	1.88	1.89	1.89	1.81	1.75
Lincolnshire	United Kingdom	1.76	1.79	1.85	1.96	1.92	1.94	1.98	1.98	1.86	1.90	1.89	1.81	1.79	1.67
Herefordshire, Worcestershire and Warwickshire	United Kingdom	1.77	1.84	1.87	1.89	1.86	1.94	1.92	1.98	1.89	1.82	1.85	1.83	1.79	1.75
Shropshire and Staffordshire	United Kingdom	1.83	1.85	1.94	1.98	1.94	1.93	1.97	1.96	1.88	1.88	1.82	1.86	1.79	1.75
West Midlands	United Kingdom	1.95	1.99	2.04	2.09	2.06	2.07	2.09	2.10	2.02	1.98	1.94	1.96	1.88	1.79
East Anglia	United Kingdom	1.75	1.80	1.87	1.95	1.91	1.95	1.96	2.00	1.90	1.88	1.89	1.88	1.80	1.74
Bedfordshire and Hertfordshire	United Kingdom	1.88	1.94	2.00	2.07	2.03	2.07	2.05	2.03	1.95	1.94	1.94	1.93	1.88	1.84
Essex	United Kingdom	1.82	1.87	1.94	1.98	2.00	2.02	1.99	2.05	1.93	1.96	1.94	1.93	1.91	1.84
Inner London - West	United Kingdom									1.34	1.30	1.30	1.31	1.27	1.25
Inner London - East	United Kingdom									1.64	1.58	1.58	1.54	1.51	1.44
Outer London - East and North East	United Kingdom									2.01	1.97	2.02	2.02	1.97	1.89
Outer London - South	United Kingdom									1.84	1.86	1.89	1.89	1.85	1.75
Outer London - West and North West	United Kingdom									1.87	1.84	1.90	1.88	1.93	1.83
Berkshire, Buckinghamshire and Oxfordshire	United Kingdom	1.76	1.85	1.91	1.97	1.95	2.00	2.00	1.99	1.89	1.88	1.89	1.88	1.83	1.79
Surrey, East Sussex and West Sussex	United Kingdom	1.70	1.78	1.83	1.86	1.86	1.90	1.91	1.91	1.83	1.81	1.81	1.79	1.72	1.69
Hampshire and Isle of Wight	United Kingdom	1.67	1.76	1.80	1.86	1.84	1.90	1.92	1.94	1.82	1.83	1.81	1.77	1.71	1.65
Kent	United Kingdom	1.86	1.92	1.94	1.99	1.99	2.02	2.01	2.06	1.92	1.93	1.91	1.90	1.89	1.83
Gloucestershire, Wiltshire and Bristol	United Kingdom	1.71	1.76	1.84	1.90	1.85	1.95	1.94	1.96	1.86	1.85	1.82	1.81	1.71	1.66
Dorset and Somerset	United Kingdom	1.74	1.79	1.86	1.92	1.94	1.95	1.96	1.93	1.89	1.86	1.85	1.80	1.79	1.70
Cornwall and Isles of Scilly	United Kingdom	1.74	1.87	1.85	1.96	1.96	1.98	2.06	2.02	1.98	1.90	1.89	1.85	1.79	1.72
Devon	United Kingdom	1.73	1.76	1.85	1.87	1.91	1.91	1.95	1.96	1.86	1.83	1.80	1.72	1.69	1.62
West Wales and the Valleys	United Kingdom	1.81	1.85	1.87	1.92	1.87	1.95	1.92	1.90	1.78	1.79	1.77	1.75	1.69	1.65
East Wales	United Kingdom	1.72	1.78	1.83	1.91	1.86	1.88	1.87	1.84	1.81	1.75	1.74	1.72	1.70	1.63
North Eastern Scotland	United Kingdom	1.50	1.59	1.67	1.73	1.73	1.66	1.62	1.66	1.53	1.56	1.56	1.52	1.45	1.44
Scottish Highlands and islands	United Kingdom	1.76	1.77	1.85	1.93	1.87	1.87	1.83	1.83	1.79	1.79	1.74	1.72	1.62	1.58
Eastern Scotland	United Kingdom	1.56	1.61	1.67	1.74	1.70	1.69	1.67	1.64	1.58	1.58	1.51	1.49	1.39	1.34
West Central Scotland	United Kingdom													1.45	1.37
Southern Scotland	United Kingdom													1.64	1.61
Northern Ireland	United Kingdom	1.84	1.90	1.98	2.06	1.99	2.02	2.03	1.93	1.96	1.97	1.96	1.95	1.87	1.86
Iceland	Iceland	2.05	2.08	2.09	2.15	2.23	2.20	2.02	2.04	1.93	1.93	1.80	1.74	1.71	1.71
Liechtenstein	Liechtenstein	1.49	1.43	1.42	1.43	1.71	1.40	1.69	1.51	1.45	1.59	1.40	1.61	1.44	1.58
Oslo and Akershus	Norway	1.78	1.85	1.84	1.87	1.88	1.87	1.80	1.78	1.69	1.64	1.64	1.63	1.54	1.50
Hedmark and Oppland	Norway	1.70	1.79	1.74	1.88	1.90	1.84	1.78	1.82	1.68	1.74	1.65	1.64	1.57	1.51
Sør-Østlandet	Norway	1.74	1.82	1.81	1.89	1.90	1.85	1.82	1.78	1.72	1.78	1.67	1.65	1.60	1.56
Rogaland, Vest-Agder & Aust-Agder	Norway	1.94	2.09	2.04	2.10	2.15	2.15	2.04	2.02	1.94	1.87	1.85	1.85	1.77	1.68
Vestlandet	Norway	1.96	1.93	1.99	2.03	2.07	1.99	1.96	1.91	1.84	1.81	1.82	1.79	1.70	1.64
Trøndelag	Norway	1.89	1.95	1.93	2.02	2.00	2.01	1.89	1.84	1.84	1.79	1.74	1.72	1.63	1.53
Nord-Norge	Norway	1.87	1.90	1.97	1.99	2.02	1.96	1.89	1.84	1.81	1.71	1.74	1.68	1.59	1.54
Lake Geneva	Switzerland	1.50	1.50	1.52	1.51	1.53	1.56	1.53	1.54	1.55	1.55	1.53	1.54	1.52	1.51
Espace Mittelland	Switzerland	1.44	1.44	1.46	1.49	1.53	1.54	1.54	1.55	1.52	1.54	1.55	1.56	1.53	1.53
Northwestern Switzerland	Switzerland	1.37	1.38	1.39	1.45	1.43	1.51	1.48	1.51	1.47	1.52	1.50	1.53	1.52	1.51
Zurich metropolitan area	Switzerland	1.43	1.46	1.47	1.50	1.51	1.51	1.50	1.50	1.50	1.55	1.53	1.52	1.50	1.47
Eastern Switzerland	Switzerland	1.35	1.39	1.43	1.43	1.46	1.49	1.54	1.53	1.55	1.55	1.59	1.61	1.54	1.59
Central Switzerland	Switzerland	1.43	1.48	1.48	1.55	1.52	1.54	1.55	1.59	1.55	1.56	1.57	1.57	1.56	1.59
Ticino	Switzerland	1.22	1.25	1.28	1.37	1.35	1.40	1.43	1.38	1.38	1.41	1.44	1.37	1.37	1.28
Montenegro	Montenegro	1.60	1.63	1.69	1.77	1.85	1.69	1.65	1.71	1.73	1.75	1.74	1.79	1.78	1.76
North Macedonia	North Macedonia	1.46	1.46	1.46	1.47	1.52	1.56	1.46	1.51	1.49	1.52	1.49	1.50	1.43	1.42
Belgrade	Serbia													1.48	1.49
Vojvodina	Serbia													1.51	1.48
Šumadija and Western Serbia	Serbia													1.48	1.50
Southern and Eastern Serbia	Serbia													1.42	1.41
Istanbul	Turkey				1.86	1.73	1.74	1.71	1.79	1.79	1.87	1.87	1.85	1.79	1.72
Tekirdağ, Edirne and Kırklareli	Turkey					1.54	1.52	1.57	1.64	1.65	1.70	1.76	1.74	1.74	1.72
Balıkesir and Çanakkale	Turkey					1.51	1.51	1.56	1.60	1.60	1.66	1.61	1.63	1.63	1.60
İzmir	Turkey					1.55	1.52	1.55	1.64	1.63	1.71	1.71	1.68	1.66	1.59
Aydın, Denizli and Muğla	Turkey					1.71	1.67	1.68	1.76	1.75	1.82	1.82	1.79	1.79	1.71
Manisa, Afyonkarahisar and Kütahya	Turkey					1.77	1.76	1.77	1.81	1.81	1.87	1.87	1.82	1.79	1.74
Bursa, Eskişehir and Bilecik	Turkey					1.67	1.65	1.64	1.74	1.75	1.81	1.82	1.82	1.80	1.77
Kocaeli, Sakarya, Düzce and Bolu	Turkey					1.84	1.79	1.78	1.84	1.84	1.94	1.95	1.96	1.93	1.89
Ankara	Turkey					1.66	1.63	1.64	1.67	1.69	1.76	1.76	1.73	1.71	1.65
Konya and Karaman	Turkey					2.11	2.07	2.10	2.15	2.15	2.21	2.18	2.16	2.11	2.05
Antalya, Isparta, Burdur	Turkey					1.85	1.80	1.79	1.85	1.83	1.90	1.91	1.88	1.80	1.71
Adana and Mersin	Turkey					2.09	2.07	2.06	2.15	2.18	2.27	2.25	2.21	2.16	2.08
Hatay, Kahramanmaraş and Osmaniye	Turkey					2.57	2.56	2.53	2.61	2.63	2.72	2.65	2.61	2.53	2.42
Kırıkkale, Aksaray, Niğde and Nevşehir	Turkey					2.10	2.02	2.00	2.01	2.00	2.08	2.02	2.00	1.93	1.87
Kayseri, Sivas and Yozgat	Turkey					2.15	2.07	2.07	2.07	2.04	2.12	2.09	2.05	1.98	1.88
Zonguldak, Karabük and Bartın	Turkey					1.69	1.63	1.59	1.57	1.57	1.59	1.55	1.48	1.46	1.44
Kastamonu, Çankırı and Sinop	Turkey					1.80	1.76	1.74	1.76	1.71	1.70	1.68	1.67	1.61	1.60
Samsun, Tokat, Çorum and Amasya	Turkey					1.88	1.83	1.79	1.83	1.82	1.85	1.80	1.77	1.75	1.71
Trabzon, Ordu, Giresun and Rize	Turkey				1.77	1.84	1.79	1.76	1.77	1.76	1.79	1.77	1.76	1.71	1.68
Erzurum, Erzincan and Bayburt	Turkey					2.31	2.29	2.35	2.34	2.32	2.39	2.33	2.29	2.21	2.08
Ağrı, Kars, Iğdır and Ardahan	Turkey					3.21	3.40	3.38	3.36	3.29	3.34	3.21	3.13	3.06	2.81
Malatya, Elazığ, Bingöl and Tunceli	Turkey					2.07	2.04	2.03	2.02	2.00	2.10	2.05	2.03	2.02	1.95
Van, Muş, Bitlis and Hakkâri	Turkey					3.69	3.63	3.53	3.44	3.47	3.46	3.29	3.16	3.13	2.94
Gaziantep, Adıyaman and Kilis	Turkey					2.97	2.93	2.92	3.01	3.01	3.14	3.07	2.97	2.87	2.79
Şanlıurfa and Diyarbakır	Turkey					3.73	3.77	3.78	3.80	3.75	3.91	3.81	3.75	3.73	3.57
Mardin, Batman, Şırnak and Siirt	Turkey					3.79	3.74	3.60	3.61	3.52	3.67	3.51	3.28	3.32	3.17
