= NUTS statistical regions of the Czech Republic =

Geocode standard for the Czech Republic

The Nomenclature of Territorial Units for Statistics (NUTS) is a geocode standard for referencing the subdivisions of the Czech Republic for statistical purposes. The standard is developed and regulated by the European Union. The NUTS standard is instrumental in delivering the European Union's Structural Funds. The NUTS code for the Czech Republic is CZ and a hierarchy of three levels is established by Eurostat. Below these is a further levels of geographic organisation - the local administrative unit (LAU). In the Czech Republic, the LAU 1 is districts and the LAU 2 is municipalities.

== Overall ==
Level	Subdivisions	#
NUTS 1	Whole Country	1
NUTS 2	Cohesion region (Region soudržnosti)	8
NUTS 3	Region (Kraj)	14

== NUTS codes ==
NUTS 2 regions of the Czech Republic

NUTS 3 regions of the Czech Republic

NUTS 1	Code	NUTS 2	Code	NUTS 3	Code
Czech Republic	CZ0	Prague	CZ01	Prague	CZ010
Czech Republic	CZ0	Střední Čechy (Central Bohemia)	CZ02	Central Bohemian Region	CZ020
Czech Republic	CZ0	Jihozápad (Southwest)	CZ03	South Bohemian Region	CZ031
Czech Republic	CZ0	Jihozápad (Southwest)	CZ03	Plzeň Region	CZ032
Czech Republic	CZ0	Severozápad (Northwest)	CZ04	Karlovy Vary Region	CZ041
Czech Republic	CZ0	Severozápad (Northwest)	CZ04	Ústí nad Labem Region	CZ042
Czech Republic	CZ0	Severovýchod (Northeast)	CZ05	Liberec Region	CZ051
Czech Republic	CZ0	Severovýchod (Northeast)	CZ05	Hradec Králové Region	CZ052
Czech Republic	CZ0	Severovýchod (Northeast)	CZ05	Pardubice Region	CZ053
Czech Republic	CZ0	Jihovýchod (Southeast)	CZ06	Vysočina Region	CZ063
Czech Republic	CZ0	Jihovýchod (Southeast)	CZ06	South Moravian Region	CZ064
Czech Republic	CZ0	Střední Morava (Central Moravia)	CZ07	Olomouc Region	CZ071
Czech Republic	CZ0	Střední Morava (Central Moravia)	CZ07	Zlín Region	CZ072
Czech Republic	CZ0	Moravskoslezsko (Moravian-Silesian)	CZ08	Moravian-Silesian Region	CZ080

In the 2003 version, the Vysočina Region was coded CZ061, and the South Moravian Region was coded CZ062.

== Local administrative units ==
Below the NUTS levels, the two LAU (Local Administrative Units) levels are:

Level	Subdivisions	#
LAU 1	Districts (Okresy) and Prague	77
LAU 2	Municipalities (Obce)	6254

The LAU codes of the Czech Republic can be downloaded here:

== See also ==
- List of Czech regions by Human Development Index
- Subdivisions of the Czech Republic
- ISO 3166-2 codes of the Czech Republic
- FIPS region codes of the Czech Republic

== Sources ==
- Hierarchical list of the Nomenclature of territorial units for statistics - NUTS and the Statistical regions of Europe
- Overview map of EU Countries - NUTS level 1
- Correspondence between the NUTS levels and the national administrative units
- List of current NUTS codes
  - Download current NUTS codes (ODS format)
- Regions of the Czech Republic, Statoids.com
- Districts of the Czech Republic, Statoids.com
