= Regions of the Czech Republic =

Administrative divisions of the Czech Republic

Regions of the Czech Republic Kraje České republiky (Czech)
- Category: Unitary state
- Location: Czech Republic
- Number: 13 regions + Prague
- Populations: 292,027 (Karlovy Vary Region) – 1,477,134 (Central Bohemian Region)
- Areas: 3,163 km^{2} (1,221 sq mi) (Liberec Region) – 10,929 km^{2} (4,220 sq mi) (Central Bohemian Region)
- Government: Region government, national government
- Subdivisions: District

Regions of the Czech Republic (Czech: kraje [ˈkrajɛ]; singular kraj [kraj]) are higher-level territorial self-governing units of the Czech Republic.

== History ==
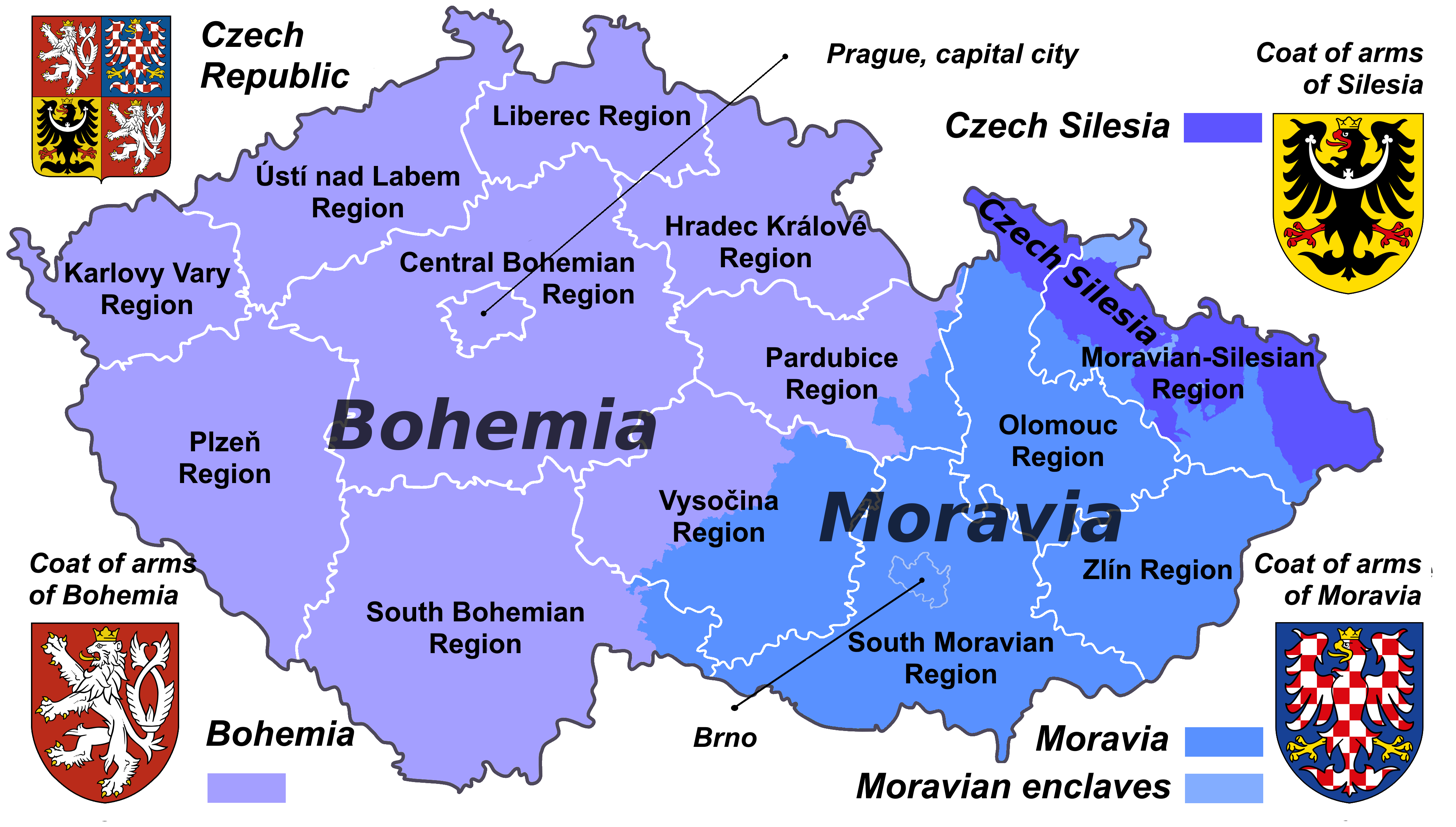
Historical lands and current administrative regions

The first regions (Czech: kraje, German: Kreise) were created in the Kingdom of Bohemia in the 14th century. At the beginning of the 15th century, Bohemia was already divided into 12 regions, but their borders were not fixed due to the frequent changes in the borders of the estates. During the reign of George of Poděbrady (1458–1471), Bohemia was divided into 14 regions, which remained so until 1714, when their number was reduced to 12 again. From 1751 to 1850, after the four largest regions were divided, the kingdom consisted of 16 regions. Between 1850 and 1862, there were several reforms and the number of regions fluctuated between 7 and 13. Due to the parallel establishment of political districts in 1848, however, their importance declined. In 1862, the regions were abolished, although the regional authorities had some powers until 1868.

The Margraviate of Moravia was divided into four regions in 1529. In 1569–1735, their number was five, then the number increased to six. After the introduction of the political districts in 1850, Moravia consisted of two regions. In 1855–1860, there were six regions, but in 1860 they were abolished.

Silesia was historically divided into many small duchies, most of which were annexed by Prussia in 1742. The rump Austrian Silesia, which makes up most of what is now Czech Silesia, was not divided into regions until 1783, when it was divided into two regions: Opava (Troppau) and Těšín (Teschen, Cieszyn). At this time the Moravian enclaves in Silesia became administratively tied to Silesia and the Opava region. From 1850, Czech Silesia formed one region.

From the 1860s to 1948, the Czech lands were divided into counties and districts. Regions were reintroduced in 1949 in Czechoslovakia. From 1949 to 1960, the Czech part of Czechoslovakia was divided into the Capital City of Prague and 13 regions. In 1960–1999, the Czech part of Czechoslovakia was divided into the Capital City of Prague and following 7 regions:

- Central Bohemian Region (Středočeský kraj) with the capital in Prague
- South Bohemian Region (Jihočeský kraj) with the capital in České Budějovice
- West Bohemian Region (Západočeský kraj) with the capital in Plzeň
- North Bohemian Region (Severočeský kraj) with the capital in Ústí nad Labem
- East Bohemian Region (Východočeský kraj) with the capital in Hradec Králové
- South Moravian Region (Jihomoravský kraj) with the capital in Brno
- North Moravian Region (Severomoravský kraj) with the capital in Ostrava

According to the Act no. 129/2000 Coll. ("Law on Regions"), which implements Chapter VII of the Czech Constitution, the Czech Republic is divided into thirteen regions and one capital city with regional status as of 1 January 2000. The capital city of Prague, which has simultaneously the status of a region and a municipality, is treated by Act no. 131/2000 Coll. ("Law on Capital City of Prague").

== Competences ==
Rights and obligations of the regions include:

- Establishment of secondary schools;
- Responsibility for hospitals and social facilities;
- Construction and repair of second and third class roads;
- Organisation of integrated transport systems;
- Ordering of public intermunicipal transport;
- Protection of the nature;
- Cooperation in the distribution of EU funds within the NUTS-2 regions;
- Tasks within the integrated rescue system;
- Right to propose laws to the Chamber of Deputies and submit complaints to the Constitutional Court.

== Government ==
Every region is governed by a regional council, headed by a governor (hejtman). Elections to regional councils take place every four years. The number of council members varies according to the population in the region and consists of 45 (population under 600,000), 55 (population 600,000–900,000) or 65 people (population over 900,000).

== List of regions ==
Vehicle registration plate	Region	Capital	Population (2026)	Area (km^{2})	Pop. density (per km^{2})	GDP (million CZK, 2022)	GDP per capita (2022)
A	Prague		1,407,084	496	2,837	1,926,323	1,453,579
S	Central Bohemian	Prague (Note: Administrative buildings only. Prague is not considered a part of the region.)	1,477,134	10,929	135	775,682	557,641
C	South Bohemian	České Budějovice	652,896	10,058	65	309,007	480,506
P	Plzeň	Plzeň	614,683	7,649	80	326,669	553,512
K	Karlovy Vary	Karlovy Vary	292,027	3,310	88	111,015	377,886
U	Ústí nad Labem	Ústí nad Labem	805,943	5,339	151	360,731	440,737
L	Liberec	Liberec	448,610	3,163	142	202,639	457,749
H	Hradec Králové	Hradec Králové	554,668	4,759	117	299,250	543,106
E	Pardubice	Pardubice	530,950	4,519	117	268,290	513,222
J	Vysočina	Jihlava	515,953	6,796	76	241,562	474,282
B	South Moravian	Brno	1,230,516	7,188	171	745,193	624,757
M	Olomouc	Olomouc	631,480	5,272	120	317,890	503,709
Z	Zlín	Zlín	577,515	3,963	146	304,826	524,888
T	Moravian-Silesian	Ostrava	1,176,380	5,427	217	597,665	499,813
CZ	Czech Republic	Prague	10,915,839	78,871	138	6,786,742	634,993

== Coats of arms ==
Central Bohemian Region

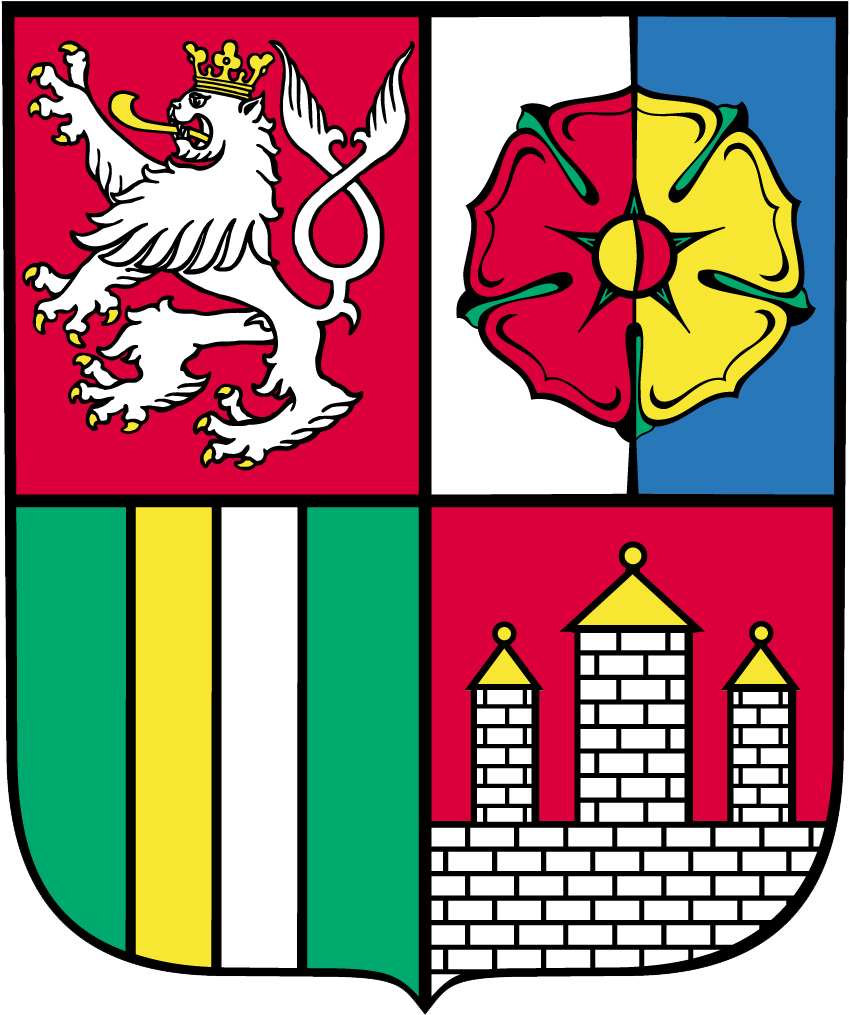
South Bohemian Region

Plzeň Region

Karlovy Vary Region

Ústí nad Labem Region

Liberec Region

Hradec Králové Region

Pardubice Region

Vysočina Region

South Moravian Region

Olomouc Region

Zlín Region

Moravian-Silesian Region

== See also ==
- List of Czech regions by Human Development Index
- ISO 3166-2:CZ
- Královec Region, an internet meme
