= ISO 3166-2:CZ =

Entry for Czechia in ISO 3166-2

ISO 3166-2:CZ is the entry for Czechia in ISO 3166-2, part of the ISO 3166 standard published by the International Organization for Standardization (ISO), which defines codes for the names of the principal subdivisions (e.g., provinces or states) of all countries coded in ISO 3166-1.

Currently, ISO 3166-2 codes are defined for two levels of subdivisions within the country:

- 13 regions and one capital city
- 76 districts

Each code consists of two parts, separated by a hyphen. The first part is CZ, the ISO 3166-1 alpha-2 code for the country. The second part is either of the following:

- two digits: regions
- three characters (two digits followed by a digit or a letter): districts

For the districts, the first two digits indicate the region that the district is in (based on the original NUTS code of the region):

- 10 and 11: Prague
- 20: Central Bohemian Region
- 31: South Bohemian Region
- 32: Plzeň Region
- 41: Karlovy Vary Region
- 42: Ústí nad Labem Region
- 51: Liberec Region
- 52: Hradec Králové Region
- 53: Pardubice Region
- 63: Vysočina Region
- 64: South Moravian Region
- 71: Olomouc Region
- 72: Zlín Region
- 80: Moravian-Silesian Region

== Current codes ==
Subdivision names are listed as in the ISO 3166-2 standard published by the ISO 3166 Maintenance Agency (ISO 3166/MA).

Subdivision names are sorted in Czech alphabetical order: a (á), b, c, č, d (ď), e (é) (ě), f, g, h, ch, i (í), j, k, l, m, n (ň), o (ó), p, q, r, ř, s, š, t (ť), u (ú) (ů), v, w, x, y (ý), z, ž.

Click on the button in the header to sort each column.

=== Regions ===
Code	Subdivision name (cs)	Subdivision name (en) (Note: For reference only, English Name not included in the ISO 3166-2 standard.)	Subdivision category
CZ-31	Jihočeský kraj	South Bohemia	region
CZ-64	Jihomoravský kraj	South Moravia	region
CZ-41	Karlovarský kraj	Karlovy Vary	region
CZ-52	Královéhradecký kraj	Hradec Králové	region
CZ-51	Liberecký kraj	Liberec	region
CZ-80	Moravskoslezský kraj	Moravia-Silesia	region
CZ-71	Olomoucký kraj	Olomouc	region
CZ-53	Pardubický kraj	Pardubice	region
CZ-32	Plzeňský kraj	Plzeň	region
CZ-10	Praha, Hlavní město	Prague	capital city
CZ-20	Středočeský kraj	Central Bohemia	region
CZ-42	Ústecký kraj	Ústí nad Labem	region
CZ-63	Kraj Vysočina	Vysočina	region
CZ-72	Zlínský kraj	Zlín	region

=== Districts ===
Code	Subdivision name	In region
CZ-201	Benešov	20
CZ-202	Beroun	20
CZ-641	Blansko	64
CZ-642	Brno-město	64
CZ-643	Brno-venkov	64
CZ-801	Bruntál	80
CZ-644	Břeclav	64
CZ-511	Česká Lípa	51
CZ-311	České Budějovice	31
CZ-312	Český Krumlov	31
CZ-421	Děčín	42
CZ-321	Domažlice	32
CZ-802	Frýdek-Místek	80
CZ-631	Havlíčkův Brod	63
CZ-645	Hodonín	64
CZ-521	Hradec Králové	52
CZ-411	Cheb	41
CZ-422	Chomutov	42
CZ-531	Chrudim	53
CZ-512	Jablonec nad Nisou	51
CZ-711	Jeseník	71
CZ-522	Jičín	52
CZ-632	Jihlava	63
CZ-313	Jindřichův Hradec	31
CZ-412	Karlovy Vary	41
CZ-803	Karviná	80
CZ-203	Kladno	20
CZ-322	Klatovy	32
CZ-204	Kolín	20
CZ-721	Kroměříž	72
CZ-205	Kutná Hora	20
CZ-513	Liberec	51
CZ-423	Litoměřice	42
CZ-424	Louny	42
CZ-206	Mělník	20
CZ-207	Mladá Boleslav	20
CZ-425	Most	42
CZ-523	Náchod	52
CZ-804	Nový Jičín	80
CZ-208	Nymburk	20
CZ-712	Olomouc	71
CZ-805	Opava	80
CZ-806	Ostrava-město	80
CZ-532	Pardubice	53
CZ-633	Pelhřimov	63
CZ-314	Písek	31
CZ-324	Plzeň-jih	32
CZ-323	Plzeň-město	32
CZ-325	Plzeň-sever	32
CZ-209	Praha-východ	20
CZ-20A	Praha-západ	20
CZ-315	Prachatice	31
CZ-713	Prostějov	71
CZ-714	Přerov	71
CZ-20B	Příbram	20
CZ-20C	Rakovník	20
CZ-326	Rokycany	32
CZ-524	Rychnov nad Kněžnou	52
CZ-514	Semily	51
CZ-413	Sokolov	41
CZ-316	Strakonice	31
CZ-533	Svitavy	53
CZ-715	Šumperk	71
CZ-317	Tábor	31
CZ-327	Tachov	32
CZ-426	Teplice	42
CZ-525	Trutnov	52
CZ-634	Třebíč	63
CZ-722	Uherské Hradiště	72
CZ-427	Ústí nad Labem	42
CZ-534	Ústí nad Orlicí	53
CZ-723	Vsetín	72
CZ-646	Vyškov	64
CZ-724	Zlín	72
CZ-647	Znojmo	64
CZ-635	Žďár nad Sázavou	63

== Changes ==
The following changes to the entry have been announced in newsletters by the ISO 3166/MA since the first publication of ISO 3166-2 in 1998:

Newsletter	Date issued	Description of change in newsletter	Code/Subdivision change
Newsletter I-2	2002-05-21	Completely new subdivision layout. New reference for the list source	Subdivision layout: 1 city, 7 regions (see below) → 14 regions
Newsletter I-3	2002-08-20	Error correction: Spelling correction and correction of word order in CZ-VY. List of subdivision names resorted	
Newsletter I-5	2003-09-05	Spelling correction in CZ-PR and adjustment of name form in CZ-VY	
Newsletter I-9	2007-11-28	Addition of administrative subdivisions and of their code elements	Subdivisions added: 91 districts
Newsletter II-1	2010-02-03 (corrected 2010-02-19)	Addition of the country code prefix as the first code element, alphabetical re-ordering	

The following changes to the entry are listed on ISO's online catalogue, the Online Browsing Platform:

Effective date of change	Short description of change	Code/Subdivision change
2010-02-19	Addition of the country code prefix as the first code element, alphabetical re-ordering	
2016-09-28	Change of the short name	
2016-11-15	Addition of category name of “capital city” in eng, fra, ces; change of subdivision category of CZ-10 from region to capital city; change of spelling of CZ-802, CZ-806, CZ-63; typographical correction of CZ-615; addition of districts CZ-116 to CZ-122; change of parent subdivision from CZ-JC to CZ-31, CZ-JM to CZ-64, CZ-KA to CZ-41, CZ-KR to CZ-52, CZ-LI to CZ-51, Z-O to CZ-80, CZ-OL to CZ-71, CZ-PA to CZ-53, CZ-PL to CZ-32, CZ-ST to CZ-20, CZ-US to CZ-42, CZ-VY to CZ-63, CZ-ZL to CZ-72; change of subdivision code from CZ-621 to CZ 641, CZ-624 to CZ 644; CZ-622 to CZ 642, CZ-623 to CZ 643, CZ-611 to CZ 631, CZ-612 to CZ 632, CZ-613 to CZ 633, CZ-10A to CZ 110, CZ-10B to CZ 111, CZ-10C to CZ 112, CZ-10D to CZ 113, CZ-0E to CZ 114, CZ-10F to CZ 115, CZ-614 to CZ 634, CZ-626 to CZ 646, CZ-615 to CZ 635, CZ-627 to CZ 647, CZ-PR to CZ-10; update List Source	Change of subdivision code: CZ-621 → CZ-641; CZ-624 → CZ-644; CZ-622 → CZ-642; CZ-623 → CZ-643; CZ-611 → CZ-631; CZ-612 → CZ-632; CZ-613 → CZ-633; CZ-10A → CZ-110; CZ-10B → CZ-111; CZ-10C → CZ-112; CZ-10D → CZ-113; CZ-0E → CZ-114; CZ-10F → CZ-115; CZ-614 → CZ-634; CZ-626 → CZ-646; CZ-615 → CZ-635; CZ-627 → CZ-647; CZ-PR → CZ-10
2018-11-26	Deletion of districts CZ-101, CZ-102, CZ-103, CZ-104, CZ-105, CZ-106, CZ-107, CZ-108, CZ-109, CZ-110, CZ-111, CZ-112, CZ-113, CZ-114, CZ-115, CZ-116, CZ-117, CZ-118, CZ-119, CZ-120, CZ-121, CZ-122; Update List Source	Deletion of subdivision code: CZ-101; CZ-102; CZ-103; CZ-104; CZ-105; CZ-106; CZ-107; CZ-108; CZ-109; CZ-110; CZ-111; CZ-112; CZ-113; CZ-114; CZ-115; CZ-116; CZ-117; CZ-118; CZ-119; CZ-120; CZ-121; CZ-122
2020-03-02	Typographical correction of subdivision name of CZ-10, CZ-802; Typographical correction of subdivision category name in Czech	Change of subdivision name: CZ-10 Praha, Hlavní mešto → Praha, Hlavní město CZ-802 Frýdek Místek → Frýdek-Místek

=== Codes before Newsletter I-2 ===
Former code	Subdivision name	Subdivision category
CZ-PRG	Praha	city
CZ-CJC	Jihočeský kraj	region
CZ-CJM	Jihomoravský kraj	region
CZ-CSC	Severočeský kraj	region
CZ-CSM	Severomoravský kraj	region
CZ-CST	Středočeský kraj	region
CZ-CVC	Východočeský kraj	region
CZ-CZC	Západočeský kraj	region

== See also ==
- Subdivisions of the Czech Republic
- FIPS region codes of the Czech Republic
- NUTS codes of the Czech Republic
- Neighbouring countries: AT, DE, PL, SK
