= List of Czech regions by Human Development Index =

This is a list of NUTS2 statistical regions of the Czech Republic by Human Development Index with data for 2023.

Rank	Region	HDI (2023)
Very high human development
1	Prague	0.975
2	Jihovýchod	0.924
–	Czech Republic	0.915
3	Central Moravia	0.901
4	Jihozápad	0.898
5	Severovýchod	0.891
6	Moravia-Silesia	0.882
7	Central Bohemia	0.869
8	Severozápad	0.854
