= Districts of the Czech Republic =

Administrative divisions of the Czech Republic

Districts of the Czech Republic Okresy České republiky (Czech)
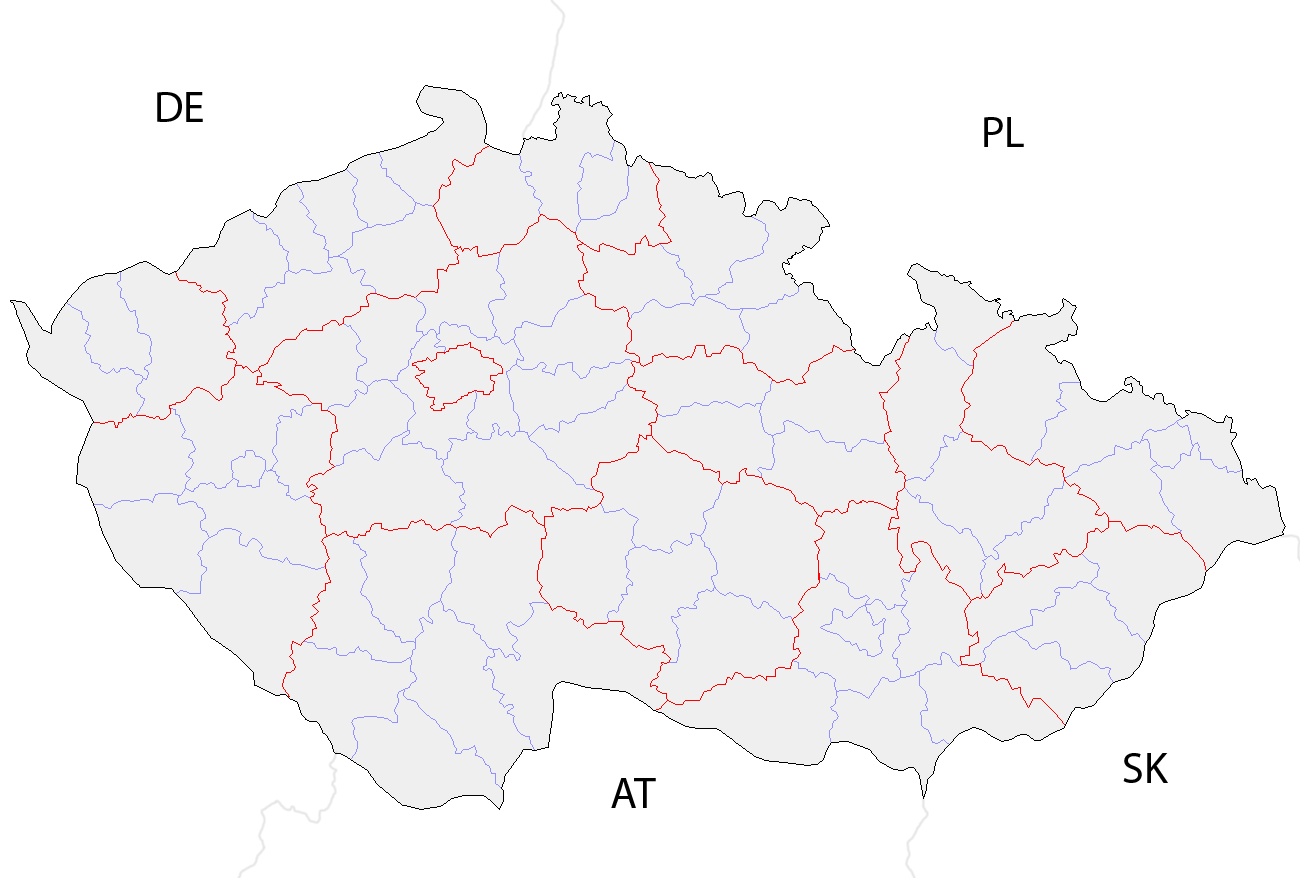
- Location: Czech Republic
- Found in: Regions of the Czech Republic (13+1)
- Created: 1960
- Abolished: 2003 (as administrative units)
- Number: 76
- Subdivisions: Administrative districts of municipalities with extended competence (205)

Districts of the Czech Republic are territorial units, formerly used as second-level administrative divisions of the Czech Republic. After their primary administrative function has been abolished in 2003, they still exist for the activities of specific authorities and as statistical units. Their administrative function was moved to selected municipalities.

== Establishment ==
In 1960, Czechoslovakia was re-divided into districts (okres, plural okresy), often without regard to traditional division and local relationships. In the area of the Czech Republic, there were 75 districts; the 76th Jeseník District was split from Šumperk District in 1996. Three consisted only of the statutory cities of Brno, Ostrava and Plzeň, which gained the status of districts only in 1971; Ostrava and Plzeň districts were later expanded. The capital city of Prague has a special status, being considered a municipality and region at the same time and not being a part of any district, but ten districts of Prague (obvody) were in some ways equivalent to okres.

== Municipalities with extended competence ==
A reform in effect since January 2003 replaced the districts with 205 Administrative Districts of Municipalities with Extended Competence (abbreviated AD MEC; správní obvody obcí s rozšířenou působností, abbreviated SO ORP), (Note: often also translated into English as Administrative Districts of Municipalities with Extended Power (AD MEP)) also called third-level municipalities, or unofficially "little districts". These municipalities took over most of the administration of the former district authorities. The old districts still exist as territorial units and remain as seats of some of the offices, especially courts, police and archives.

In 2007, the borders of the districts were slightly adjusted and 119 municipalities were moved into different districts. In 2021 another reform was made and 18 municipalities were moved between districts or between administrative districts of municipalities with extended competence.

After the 2021 reform, borders of AD MECs respect borders of districts, with only exception granted by law being AD MEC of Turnov, which is partly in districts of Semily, Jablonec nad Nisou and Liberec. The reasons are the vastness of this territory and different requirements of the territory's population.

== Municipalities with commissioned local authority ==
Administrative districts of municipalities with extended competence are further divided into 393 Administrative Districts of Municipalities with Commissioned Local Authority (abbreviated AD CLA; správní obvody obcí s pověřeným obecním úřadem, abbreviated SO POÚ), also called "second-level municipalities"). A municipality with commissioned local authority is a municipality to which the state delegates part of its powers, but not to the extent that it delegates it to a municipality with extended competence.

== Maps of districts ==
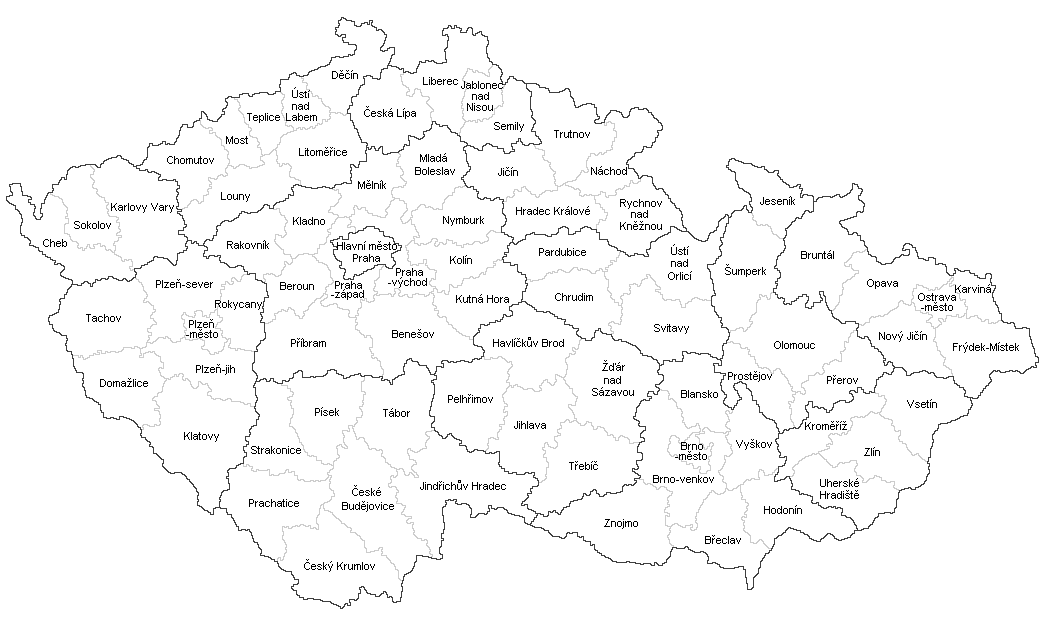
Map of districts (borders as of 2016)

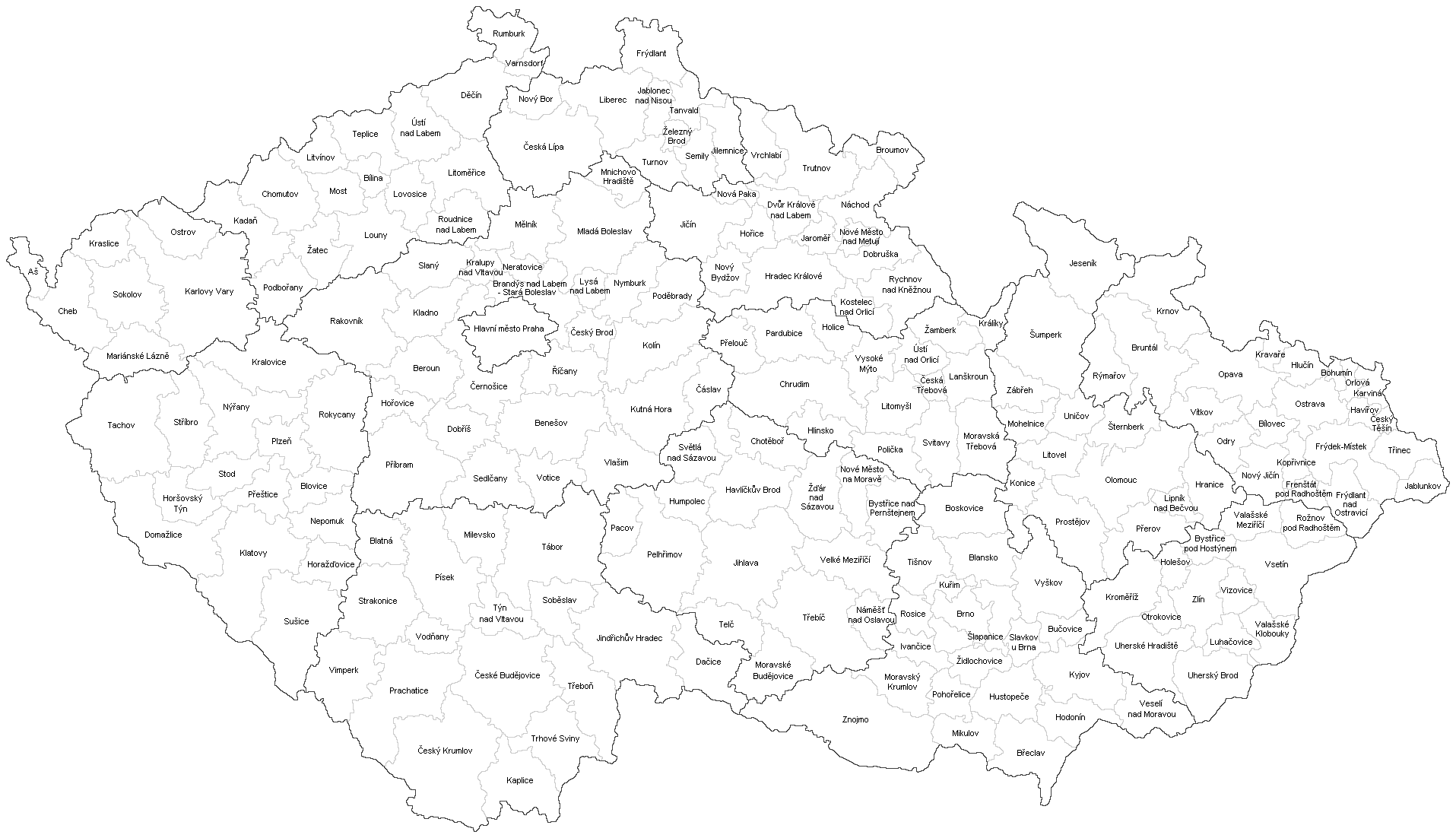
Map of administrative districts of municipalities with extended competences (borders as of 2016)

== List of districts ==
Region	District	Area (km^{2})	Population (2026)	Mun.
Prague	Prague	496	1,407,084	1
Central Bohemian Region	Benešov	1,475	104,433	114
Central Bohemian Region	Beroun	704	103,455	85
Central Bohemian Region	Kladno	720	172,388	100
Central Bohemian Region	Kolín	748	108,760	90
Central Bohemian Region	Kutná Hora	917	78,903	88
Central Bohemian Region	Mělník	701	115,209	69
Central Bohemian Region	Mladá Boleslav	1,023	138,955	120
Central Bohemian Region	Nymburk	846	108,742	86
Central Bohemian Region	Prague-East	755	207,567	110
Central Bohemian Region	Prague-West	580	163,488	79
Central Bohemian Region	Příbram	1,563	118,487	120
Central Bohemian Region	Rakovník	896	56,747	83
South Bohemian Region	České Budějovice	1,638	202,423	109
South Bohemian Region	Český Krumlov	1,614	61,584	46
South Bohemian Region	Jindřichův Hradec	1,944	89,343	106
South Bohemian Region	Písek	1,127	72,765	75
South Bohemian Region	Prachatice	1,377	50,952	65
South Bohemian Region	Strakonice	1,032	71,636	112
South Bohemian Region	Tábor	1,326	104,193	110
Plzeň Region	Domažlice	1,052	55,625	76
Plzeň Region	Klatovy	1,946	86,710	94
Plzeň Region	Plzeň-City	261	208,169	15
Plzeň Region	Plzeň-North	1,287	84,037	98
Plzeň Region	Plzeň-South	1,068	71,585	99
Plzeň Region	Rokycany	657	50,770	68
Plzeň Region	Tachov	1,378	57,787	51
Karlovy Vary Region	Cheb	1,046	93,534	40
Karlovy Vary Region	Karlovy Vary	1,511	114,178	55
Karlovy Vary Region	Sokolov	754	84,315	38
Ústí nad Labem Region	Chomutov	936	123,049	44
Ústí nad Labem Region	Děčín	909	124,991	52
Ústí nad Labem Region	Litoměřice	1,032	119,094	105
Ústí nad Labem Region	Louny	1,121	86,840	70
Ústí nad Labem Region	Most	467	107,062	26
Ústí nad Labem Region	Teplice	469	127,658	34
Ústí nad Labem Region	Ústí nad Labem	405	117,249	23
Liberec Region	Česká Lípa	1,073	102,204	57
Liberec Region	Jablonec nad Nisou	439	92,836	35
Liberec Region	Liberec	989	181,092	59
Liberec Region	Semily	662	72,478	64
Hradec Králové Region	Hradec Králové	892	167,887	104
Hradec Králové Region	Jičín	887	80,272	111
Hradec Králové Region	Náchod	852	109,238	78
Hradec Králové Region	Rychnov nad Kněžnou	982	81,263	80
Hradec Králové Region	Trutnov	1,147	116,008	75
Pardubice Region	Chrudim	993	106,533	108
Pardubice Region	Pardubice	880	181,657	112
Pardubice Region	Svitavy	1,379	104,459	116
Pardubice Region	Ústí nad Orlicí	1,267	138,301	115
Vysočina Region	Havlíčkův Brod	1,265	95,359	120
Vysočina Region	Jihlava	1,199	117,418	123
Vysočina Region	Pelhřimov	1,290	74,205	120
Vysočina Region	Třebíč	1,463	110,200	167
Vysočina Region	Žďár nad Sázavou	1,579	118,771	174
South Moravian Region	Blansko	862	111,052	116
South Moravian Region	Břeclav	1,038	117,941	63
South Moravian Region	Brno-City	230	404,296	1
South Moravian Region	Brno-Country	1,499	234,833	187
South Moravian Region	Hodonín	1,099	150,352	82
South Moravian Region	Vyškov	869	95,991	79
South Moravian Region	Znojmo	1,590	116,051	144
Olomouc Region	Jeseník	719	36,386	24
Olomouc Region	Olomouc	1,608	240,779	97
Olomouc Region	Přerov	854	126,664	105
Olomouc Region	Prostějov	777	108,873	97
Olomouc Region	Šumperk	1,313	118,778	78
Zlín Region	Kroměříž	796	103,787	79
Zlín Region	Uherské Hradiště	991	140,823	78
Zlín Region	Vsetín	1,131	141,322	59
Zlín Region	Zlín	1,045	191,583	91
Moravian-Silesian Region	Bruntál	1,537	87,396	67
Moravian-Silesian Region	Frýdek-Místek	1,208	213,442	72
Moravian-Silesian Region	Karviná	356	237,040	17
Moravian-Silesian Region	Nový Jičín	882	150,834	54
Moravian-Silesian Region	Opava	1,116	173,864	77
Moravian-Silesian Region	Ostrava-City	332	313,804	13

== See also ==
- Regions of the Czech Republic
- ISO 3166-2:CZ
