= Severovýchod =

Coordinates: 50°0′0″N 16°0′0″E

- NUTS2 Region
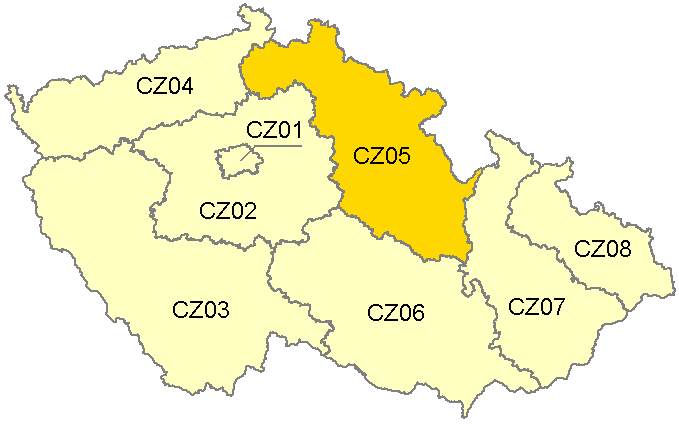
- Country: Czech Republic

Area
  - Total: 12,440 km^{2} (4,800 sq mi)

Population (2024-01-01)
  - Total: 1,538,237
  - Density: 123.7/km^{2} (320.3/sq mi)
- Time zone: UTC+1 (CET)
  - Summer (DST): UTC+2 (CEST)
- HDI (2023): 0.891 very high · 5th

Severovýchod (lit. 'Northeast') is a statistical area of the Nomenclature of Territorial Units for Statistics, level 2 NUTS. It is composed of the Liberec Region, Hradec Králové Region and Pardubice Region of the Czech Republic. It covers an area of 12,440 km^{2}, with 1,538,237 inhabitants (population density of 123 inhabitants/km^{2}).

Historical population
| Year | Pop. | ±% |
|---|---|---|
| 1869 | 1,532,112 | — |
| 1880 | 1,614,049 | +5.3% |
| 1890 | 1,662,393 | +3.0% |
| 1900 | 1,719,021 | +3.4% |
| 1910 | 1,804,295 | +5.0% |
| 1921 | 1,691,152 | −6.3% |
| 1930 | 1,758,276 | +4.0% |
| 1950 | 1,352,728 | −23.1% |
| 1961 | 1,405,834 | +3.9% |
| 1970 | 1,410,729 | +0.3% |
| 1980 | 1,485,167 | +5.3% |
| 1991 | 1,486,647 | +0.1% |
| 2001 | 1,487,189 | +0.0% |
| 2011 | 1,491,982 | +0.3% |
| 2021 | 1,483,560 | −0.6% |
Source: Censuses

== Economy ==
The Gross domestic product (GDP) of the region was 24.7 billion € in 2018, accounting for 11.9% of Czech economic output. GDP per capita adjusted for purchasing power was 23,000 € or 76% of the EU27 average in the same year. The GDP per employee was also 74% of the EU average.

== See also ==
NUTS of the Czech Republic
