= Jihovýchod =

Coordinates: 49°0′0″N 16°0′0″E

- NUTS2 Region
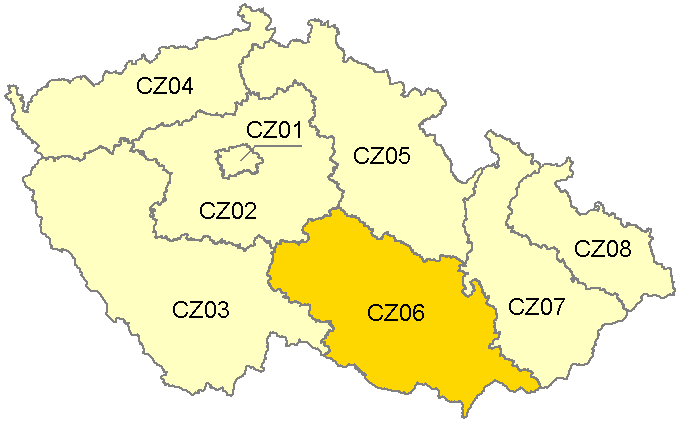
- Country: Czech Republic

Area
  - Total: 13,983 km^{2} (5,399 sq mi)

Population (2024-01-01)
  - Total: 1,744,709
  - Density: 124.77/km^{2} (323.16/sq mi)

GDP
  - Total: €47.587 billion (2024)
  - Per capita: €27,255 (2024)
- Time zone: UTC+1 (CET)
  - Summer (DST): UTC+2 (CEST)
- HDI (2023): 0.924 very high · 2nd

Jihovýchod (Southeast) is a statistical area of the Nomenclature of Territorial Units for Statistics, level NUTS 2. It comprises Vysočina Region and South Moravian Region.

It covers an area of 13 983 km^{2} and has 1,744,709 inhabitants (population density 124 inhabitants/km^{2}).

Historical population
Year	Pop.	±%
1869	1,173,736	—
1880	1,251,721	+6.6%
1890	1,307,865	+4.5%
1900	1,374,438	+5.1%
1910	1,472,647	+7.1%
1921	1,502,416	+2.0%
1930	1,567,215	+4.3%
1950	1,430,520	−8.7%
1961	1,543,283	+7.9%
1970	1,571,056	+1.8%
1980	1,650,861	+5.1%
1991	1,657,900	+0.4%
2001	1,646,923	−0.7%
2011	1,669,070	+1.3%
2021	1,695,312	+1.6%
Source: Censuses

== Economy ==
The Gross domestic product (GDP) of the region was 30.5 billion € in 2018, accounting for 14.7% of Czech economic output. GDP per capita adjusted for purchasing power was 25,300 € or 84% of the EU27 average in the same year. The GDP per employee was also 77% of the EU average.

== See also ==
NUTS of the Czech Republic
