= Central Moravia =

Coordinates: 49°30′0″N 17°30′0″E

Střední Morava
- NUTS2 Region
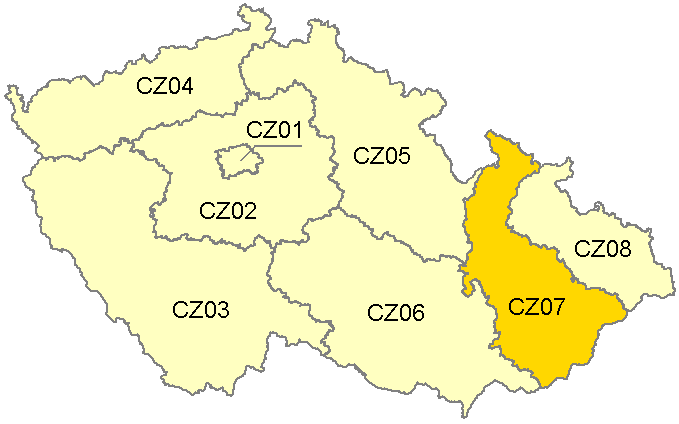
- Country: Czech Republic

Area
  - Total: 9,231 km^{2} (3,564 sq mi)

Population (2024-01-01)
  - Total: 1,213,608
  - Density: 131.5/km^{2} (340.5/sq mi)
- Time zone: UTC+1 (CET)
  - Summer (DST): UTC+2 (CEST)
- HDI (2023): 0.901 very high · 3rd

Central Moravia (Czech: Střední Morava) is an area of the Czech Republic defined by the Republic's Nomenclature of Territorial Units for Statistics, level NUTS 2. It is formed by the Olomouc Region and Zlín Region. It covers an area of 9 231 km^{2} and 1,213,608 inhabitants (population density 131 inhabitants/km^{2}).

Historical population
Year	Pop.	±%
1869	855,145	—
1880	924,658	+8.1%
1890	964,721	+4.3%
1900	1,011,286	+4.8%
1910	1,068,512	+5.7%
1921	1,065,833	−0.3%
1930	1,134,619	+6.5%
1950	1,043,689	−8.0%
1961	1,133,101	+8.6%
1970	1,165,835	+2.9%
1980	1,239,737	+6.3%
1991	1,244,244	+0.4%
2001	1,238,833	−0.4%
2011	1,208,372	−2.5%
2021	1,184,119	−2.0%
Source: Censuses

== Economy ==
The Gross domestic product (GDP) of the region was 19.3 billion € in 2018, accounting for 9.3% of Czech economic output. GDP per capita adjusted for purchasing power was 22,400 € or 74% of the EU27 average in the same year. The GDP per employee was 70% of the EU average.

== See also ==
NUTS of the Czech Republic
