= Severozápad =

Coordinates: 50°25′0″N 13°30′0″E

- NUTS2 Region
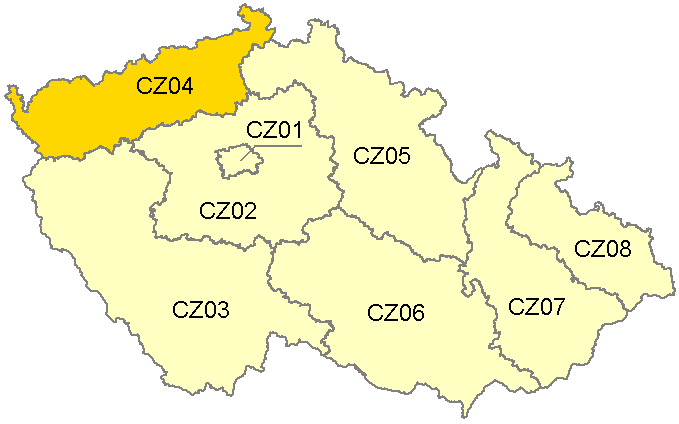
- Country: Czech Republic

Area
  - Total: 8,649 km^{2} (3,339 sq mi)

Population (2024-01-01)
  - Total: 1,106,246
  - Density: 127.9/km^{2} (331.3/sq mi)
- Time zone: UTC+1 (CET)
  - Summer (DST): UTC+2 (CEST)
- HDI (2023): 0.854 very high · 8th

Severozápad (Northwest) is a statistical area of the Nomenclature of Territorial Units for Statistics, level NUTS 2. It includes the Karlovy Vary Region and Ústí nad Labem Region.

It covers an area of 8,649 km^{2} and 1,105,932 inhabitants (population density 130 inhabitants/km^{2}).

Historical population
Year	Pop.	±%
1869	944,256	—
1880	1,082,607	+14.7%
1890	1,188,884	+9.8%
1900	1,389,177	+16.8%
1910	1,534,113	+10.4%
1921	1,493,629	−2.6%
1930	1,617,409	+8.3%
1950	978,928	−39.5%
1961	1,061,633	+8.4%
1970	1,094,872	+3.1%
1980	1,144,520	+4.5%
1991	1,126,446	−1.6%
2001	1,124,562	−0.2%
2011	1,104,556	−1.8%
2021	1,068,201	−3.3%
Source: Censuses

== Economy ==
The Gross domestic product (GDP) of the region was 15.2 billion € in 2018, accounting for 7.3% of Czech economic output. GDP per capita adjusted for purchasing power was €19,200 or 64% of the EU27 average in the same year. The GDP per employee was also 64% of the EU average.

== See also ==
NUTS of the Czech Republic
