= Jihozápad =

Coordinates: 49.3279°N 14.0025°E

- NUTS2 Region
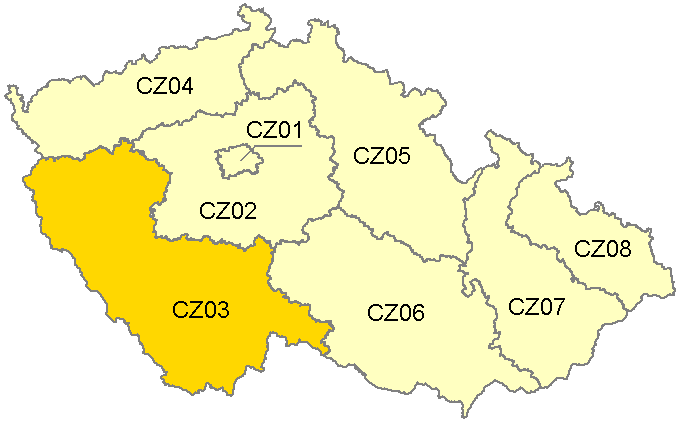
- Country: Czech Republic

Area
  - Total: 17,617 km^{2} (6,802 sq mi)

Population (2024-01-01)
  - Total: 1,267,879
  - Density: 71.969/km^{2} (186.40/sq mi)
- Time zone: UTC+1 (CET)
  - Summer (DST): UTC+2 (CEST)
- NUTS code: CZ03
- HDI (2023): 0.898 very high · 4th
- GDP per capita (PPS): € 23,600 (2018)

Jihozápad (Southwest) is statistical area of the Nomenclature of Territorial Units for Statistics, level NUTS 2. It includes the Plzeň Region and the South Bohemian Region.

It covers an area of 17 617 km^{2} and 1,267,879 inhabitants (population density 72 inhabitants/km^{2}).

Historical population
Year	Pop.	±%
1869	1,248,628	—
1880	1,328,609	+6.4%
1890	1,335,014	+0.5%
1900	1,387,327	+3.9%
1910	1,444,667	+4.1%
1921	1,437,659	−0.5%
1930	1,429,596	−0.6%
1950	1,079,789	−24.5%
1961	1,123,618	+4.1%
1970	1,128,057	+0.4%
1980	1,181,101	+4.7%
1991	1,181,196	+0.0%
2001	1,175,987	−0.4%
2011	1,198,756	+1.9%
2021	1,213,239	+1.2%
Source: Censuses

== Economy ==
The Gross domestic product (GDP) of the region was 20.6 billion € in 2018, accounting for 9.9% of Czech economic output. GDP per capita adjusted for purchasing power was 23,600 € or 78% of the EU27 average in the same year. The GDP per employee was also 75% of the EU average.

== See also ==
NUTS of the Czech Republic
